= William Morrell =

William Morrell may refer to:

- William Morrell (poet) (fl. 1625), British Anglican clergyman and early American poet
- William John Morrell (1868–1945), chancellor of Otago University, Dunedin, New Zealand
- William Morrell (historian) (1899–1986), New Zealand historian and professor

== See also ==
- Bill Morrell (Willard Blackmer Morrell), American baseball player
