= Jack Dodd =

New Zealand physicist (1922–2005)

- Born: John Newton Dodd; 19 April 1922; Hastings, New Zealand
- Died: 20 May 2005 (aged 83); Dunedin, New Zealand
- Citizenship: New Zealand
- Education: University of Birmingham
- Spouse: Jean Patricia Oldfield (m. 1950)
- Children: 4
- Awards: Hector Medal (1976)
- Scientific career
- Fields: Atomic spectroscopy, nuclear physics
- Workplaces: University of Otago
- Thesis: Proton scattering experiments: a study of the elastic and inelastic scattering of protons from gold, aluminium, magnesium and carbon (1952)

John Newton Dodd (19 April 1922 – 20 May 2005) was a New Zealand physicist who worked in the field of atomic spectroscopy.

== Early life and family ==
Born in Hastings in 1922, Dodd was educated at Otago Boys' High School. In 1950, he married Jean Patricia Oldfield with whom he had four children.

== Academic career ==
Dodd attended the University of Otago, graduating with a master's degree with first-class honours in 1946. After earning his doctorate at the University of Birmingham, he returned to the University of Otago to take up a lectureship in the Department of Physics. He was awarded a professorial chair in 1965 and retired in 1988.

While on leave in Oxford in 1959–1960, he worked with George Series who was applying techniques developed by Alfred Kastler's research group in Paris to demonstrate that radiation from a coherent superposition of excited states of atoms would display interference effects, known as quantum beats, and together they developed the theoretical explanation for the phenomenon. His friendship with Series was long lasting, and it was Jack Dodd who edited a memorial Festschrift for George Series after his death in 1995.

== Honours and awards ==
Dodd was elected a Fellow of the Royal Society of New Zealand in 1964, and was president of the society from 1989 to 1993. In 1976, he won the society's Hector Medal, at that time the highest prize in New Zealand science. In 1990, he was awarded the New Zealand 1990 Commemoration Medal.

== Honorific eponym ==
The Dodd-Walls Centre for Photonic and Quantum Technologies, a New Zealand Centre of Research excellence based in the University of Otago, was named after Jack Dodd and Dan Walls in recognition of their pioneering roles in establishing New Zealand's internationally recognised standing in photonics, quantum optics and ultra-cold atoms.

== Selected works ==
- Dodd, John N. (1991). Atoms and light: interactions. New York: Springer. ISBN 978-1-4757-9333-8.
