= Gillian Whalley =

New Zealand medical researcher

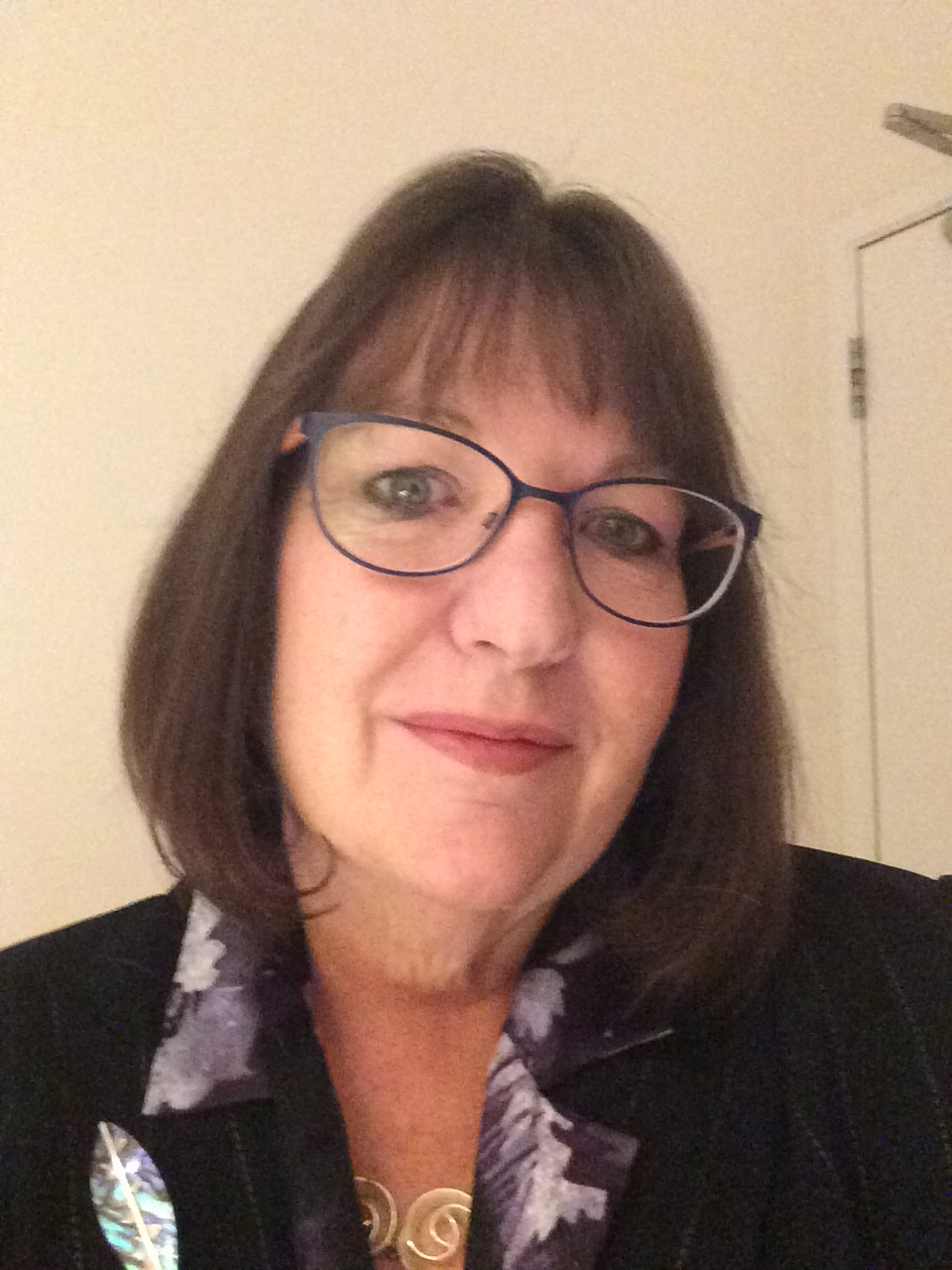
- Citizenship: New Zealand
- Education: University of Auckland
- Scientific career
- Fields: Echocardiography
- Workplaces: Unitec Institute of Technology, University of Otago
- Thesis: The role of contemporary echocardiography in the management of heart failure (2006)

Gillian Amanda Whalley is a New Zealand Professor of Clinical Sonography at the University of Otago.

== Academic career ==
Whalley became a sonographer in 1985. She practised for five years before becoming a researcher in 1990.

Her 1998 MSc Selection bias and confounding associated with echocardiographic estimation of left ventricular mass was followed in 2006 by a PhD titled The role of contemporary echocardiography in the management of heart failure at the University of Auckland. Whalley rose to full professorship at Unitec Institute of Technology, moving to the University of Otago in 2018 while maintaining an honorary position at Auckland.

Whalley has been funded by the New Zealand Health Council to study the differing effects of heart disease on Māori or Pacific peoples. This was required because existing methods are based on research using American or European subjects and more diverse data is required. For example, Māori and Pacific peoples have hearts that are larger on average than the baseline data from North American Caucasians, and this can make a difference when attempting to diagnose heart condition based on an enlarged heart. Whalley's research included screening 900 New Zealanders to collect information on normal heart sizes. The research was published in the New Zealand Medical Journal in 2022. Whalley has described the diagnosis of heart disease in New Zealand, using North American baselines, as 'systemically racist', and one of the reasons that Māori and Pacific people have higher heart disease.

In 2021, Whalley was appointed Editor in Chief of the Australasian Journal of Ultrasound in Medicine.

== Writing ==
Under the name "Gillian Whalley-Torckler", and often in conjunction with her husband, photographer Darryl Torckler, Whalley has written several books of fiction and non-fiction, for children and adults. These include photo essays, creative non-fiction for children, guides to NZ marine fishes, SCUBA diving sites, and the rocky shore, and books of knitting patterns.

== Selected works ==
- Meta-analysis Global Group in Chronic Heart Failure (MAGGIC) (2012). "The survival of patients with heart failure with preserved or reduced left ventricular ejection fraction: An individual patient data meta-analysis". European Heart Journal. 33 (14): 1750–1757. doi:10.1093/eurheartj/ehr254. hdl:10652/2127. PMID 21821849.
- Doughty, Robert N.; Whalley, Gillian A.; Gamble, Greg; MacMahon, Stephen; Sharpe, Norman (1997). "Left Ventricular Remodeling with Carvedilol in Patients with Congestive Heart Failure Due to Ischemic Heart Disease". Journal of the American College of Cardiology. 29 (5): 1060–1066. doi:10.1016/S0735-1097(97)00012-0. PMID 9120160.
- Pocock, Stuart J.; Ariti, Cono A.; McMurray, John J.V.; Maggioni, Aldo; Køber, Lars; Squire, Iain B.; Swedberg, Karl; Dobson, Joanna; Poppe, Katrina K.; Whalley, Gillian A.; Doughty, Rob N. (2013). "Predicting survival in heart failure: A risk score based on 39 372 patients from 30 studies". European Heart Journal. 34 (19): 1404–1413. doi:10.1093/eurheartj/ehs337. hdl:10652/2593. PMID 23095984.
- Doughty, Robert N.; Whalley, Gillian A.; Walsh, Helen A.; Gamble, Greg D.; LóPez-Sendón, José; Sharpe, Norman (2004). "Effects of Carvedilol on Left Ventricular Remodeling After Acute Myocardial Infarction". Circulation. 109 (2): 201–206. doi:10.1161/01.CIR.0000108928.25690.94. PMID 14707020.
- Doughty, R. (2002). "Randomized, controlled trial of integrated heart failure management. The Auckland Heart Failure Management Study". European Heart Journal. 23 (2): 139–146. doi:10.1053/euhj.2001.2712. PMID 11785996.
