= Pat Langhorne =

Scottish professor and Antarctic sea ice researcher

Pat Langhorne NZAM
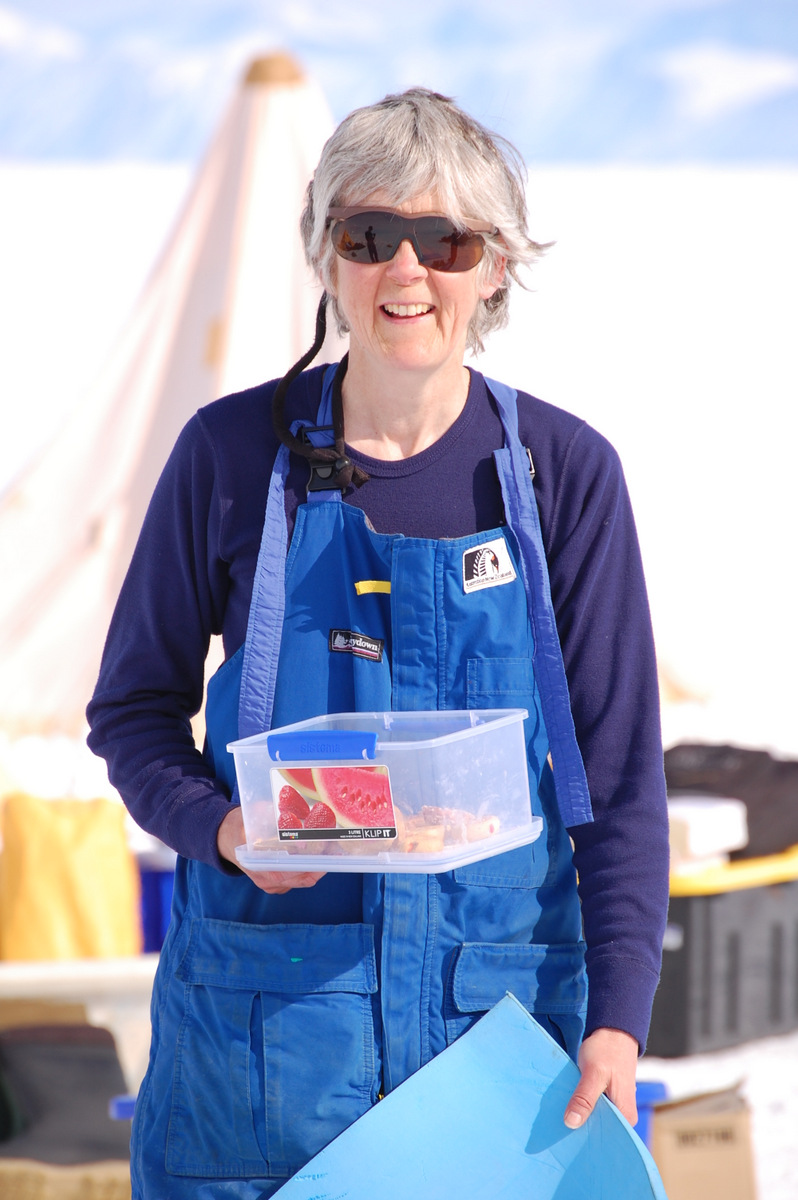
- Born: 1955 (age 70–71); Scotland
- Education: University of Aberdeen (BSc); University of Cambridge (PhD)
- Spouse: Vernon Squire (m. 1987)
- Scientific career
- Fields: Sea-ice physics
- Workplaces: University of Otago
- Thesis: Crystal alignment in sea ice (1982)
- Doctoral advisor: Peter Wadhams
- Website: University of Otago profile

Patricia Jean Langhorne NZAM (born 1955) is a British–New Zealand Antarctic sea-ice researcher. She retired as a professor in the Department of Physics at the University of Otago, New Zealand, in 2020. She was previously head of department from 2012 to 2015. She was New Zealand's leading sea-ice physicist. For a time she led the observational component of one of New Zealand's National Science Challenges – the Deep South.

== Early life, education and family ==
Langhorne was born in Scotland in 1955. Her early life was spent in Torrance, near Kirkintilloch, and she completed her schooling at Kilsyth Academy. She earned a degree in physics from the University of Aberdeen. From there she moved to Clare Hall at the University of Cambridge, where she completed her PhD on crystal alignment in sea ice in 1982, under the supervision of Peter Wadhams. She then held a fellowship with Newnham College. This was supported by Rolls-Royce, at the Whittle Laboratory, Cambridge.

At Kirkintilloch in 1987, Langhorne married mathematician Vernon Squire, who became professor of applied mathematics at the University of Otago in October that year.

== Career and impact ==
In 1985, Langhorne was invited to take part in an Antarctic experiment which brought her to New Zealand for the first time. This resulted in collaboration on examining the strength of sea ice with Bill Robinson, Vernon Squire and Tim Haskell. The work was published in Nature and underpinned the use of sea ice runways for large aircraft. Since 1988 her work has focused on teaching physics and researching sea ice physical processes at the University Otago. Langhorne was Head of the Department of Physics at the University of Otago from 2012-2015. Her work has involved over 20 research visits to Antarctica, mostly to the Ross Sea region. She has published extensively on the mechanical properties of sea ice under cyclic loading and its break-up by ocean waves, on the accretion and properties of frazil ice beneath the McMurdo fast ice, and other aspects of sea ice and ice shelves.

Langhorne has been involved in the organisation of international scientific associations including the International Glaciological Society (IGS) and the International Association for Hydro-Environment Engineering and Research (IAHR).

Her leadership in the area was recognised with her being awarded funding to lead the field component of one of the New Zealand National Science challenges, the Deep South, seeking to determine high latitude climate impacts on New Zealand.

== Honours ==
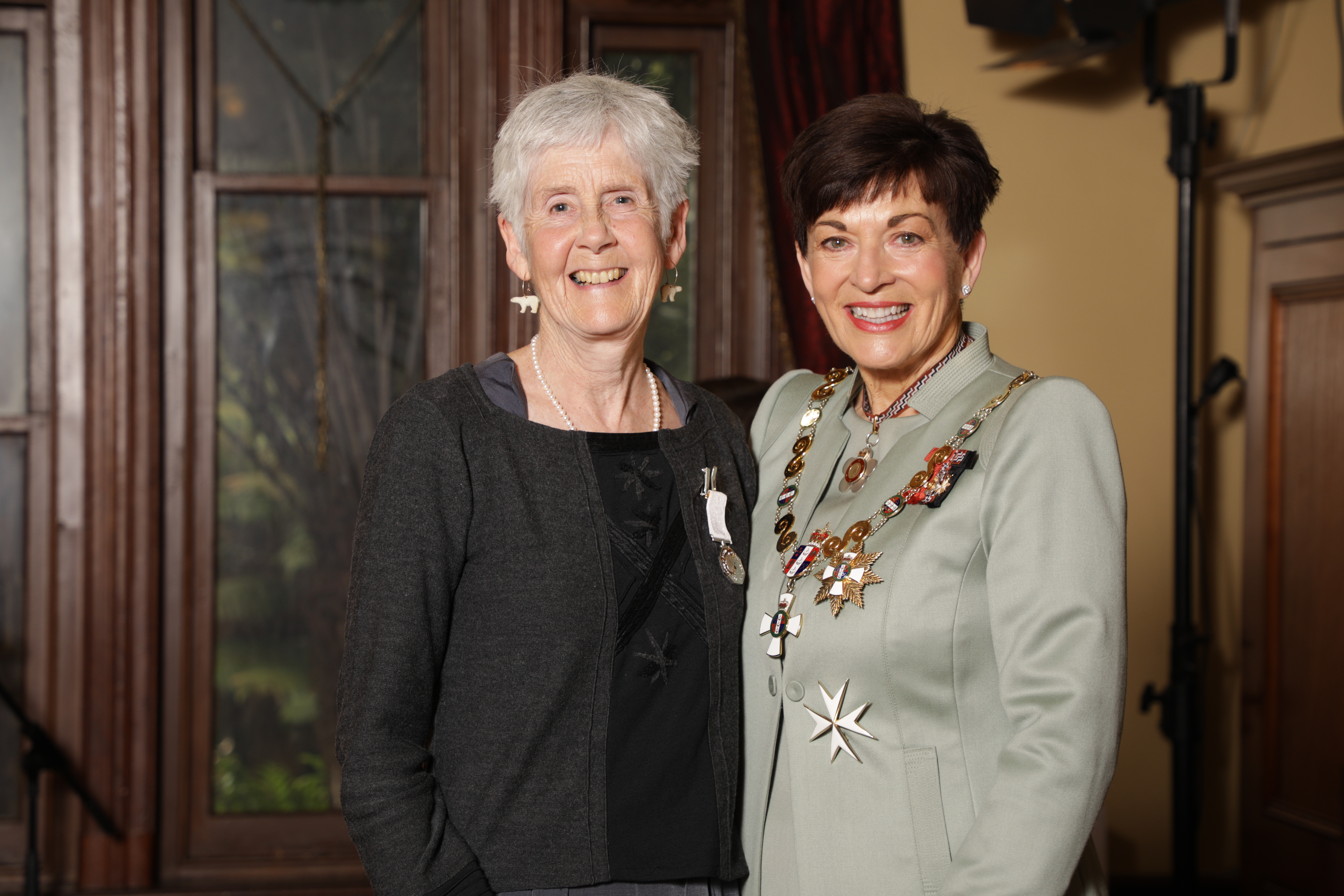
Langhorne (left) in 2019, after being presented with the New Zealand Antarctic Medal by the governor-general, Dame Patsy Reddy

In 2017, Langhorne was selected as one of the Royal Society Te Apārangi's "150 women in 150 words", a project celebrating the contributions of women to expanding knowledge in New Zealand.

In the 2019 New Year Honours, Langhorne was awarded the New Zealand Antarctic Medal, for services to Antarctic science.
