= Sarah Derrett =

New Zealand Injury prevention academic

- Born: 1964 (age 61–62)
- Education: University of Otago
- Scientific career
- Fields: Injury prevention
- Workplaces: University of Otago
- Thesis: Surgical prioritisation and patients : assessment, process and outcome (2001)

Sarah Derrett (born 1964) is a New Zealand Injury prevention academic, and as of 2019 is a full professor at the University of Otago.

== Academic career ==
After a 2001 PhD titled 'Surgical prioritisation and patients : assessment, process and outcome' at the University of Otago, Derrett moved to the Massey University and then back to Otago, rising to full professor in 2017.

== Selected works ==
- Murray, Christopher JL, Theo Vos, Rafael Lozano, Mohsen Naghavi, Abraham D. Flaxman, Catherine Michaud, Majid Ezzati et al. "Disability-adjusted life years (DALYs) for 291 diseases and injuries in 21 regions, 1990–2010: a systematic analysis for the Global Burden of Disease Study 2010." The lancet 380, no. 9859 (2012): 2197–2223.
- Vos, Theo, Abraham D. Flaxman, Mohsen Naghavi, Rafael Lozano, Catherine Michaud, Majid Ezzati, Kenji Shibuya et al. "Years lived with disability (YLDs) for 1160 sequelae of 289 diseases and injuries 1990–2010: a systematic analysis for the Global Burden of Disease Study 2010." The lancet 380, no. 9859 (2012): 2163–2196.
- Haagsma, Juanita A., Nicholas Graetz, Ian Bolliger, Mohsen Naghavi, Hideki Higashi, Erin C. Mullany, Semaw Ferede Abera et al. "The global burden of injury: incidence, mortality, disability-adjusted life years and time trends from the Global Burden of Disease study 2013." Injury prevention 22, no. 1 (2016): 3–18.
- Derrett, Sarah, Charlotte Paul, and Jenny M. Morris. "Waiting for elective surgery: effects on health-related quality of life." International Journal for Quality in Health Care 11, no. 1 (1999): 47–57.
- Coggon, David, Georgia Ntani, Keith T. Palmer, Vanda E. Felli, Raul Harari, Lope H. Barrero, Sarah A. Felknor et al. "Disabling musculoskeletal pain in working populations: is it the job, the person, or the culture?." Pain® 154, no. 6 (2013): 856–863.
- Harcombe, Helen, David McBride, Sarah Derrett, and Andrew Gray. "Prevalence and impact of musculoskeletal disorders in New Zealand nurses, postal workers and office workers." Australian and New Zealand journal of public health 33, no. 5 (2009): 437–441.
