= Department of Physics, University of Otago =

Department in the University of Otago, New Zealand

Department of Physics
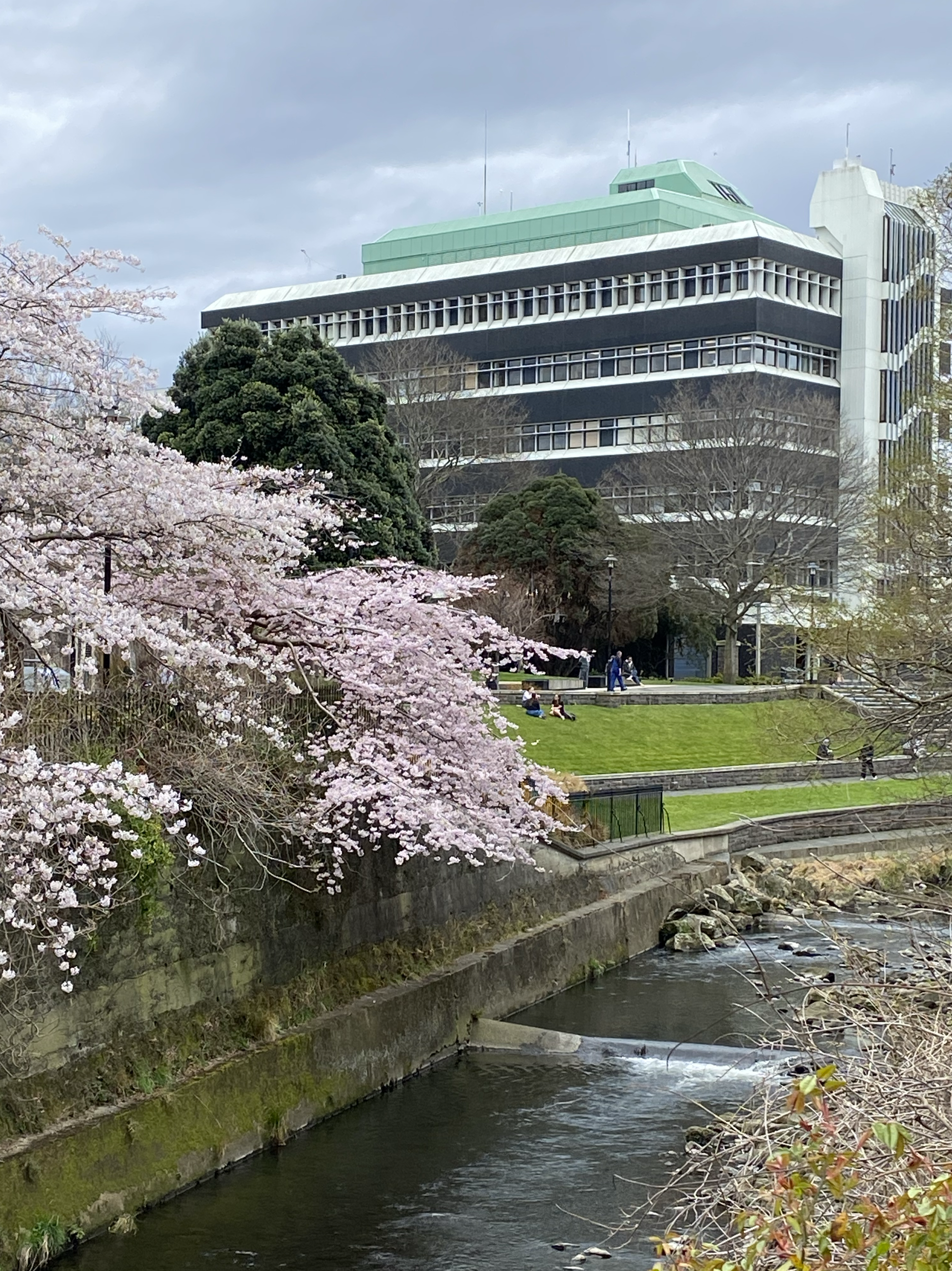
- Department of Physics building
- Type: Academic department
- Established: 1869
- Parent institution: University of Otago
- Location: Dunedin, Otago, New Zealand
- Campus: Urban
- Website: www.otago.ac.nz/physics/

The Department of Physics is an academic department at the University of Otago located in the city of Dunedin, New Zealand. It is situated in the Science 3 building, at the northwest corner of the campus. The building is located at the intersection of Cumberland and St. David Streets.

== History ==
The Department of Physics at the University of Otago in Dunedin, New Zealand—also known in Māori as Te Tari Hū-o-te-Kōhao—is the nation’s oldest physics department, starting with natural philosophy as a founding discipline of the University in 1869. Professor John Shand was the first Chair of mathematics and natural philosophy, appointed in 1870, one of three foundation professors of the university. He was succeeded by Professor Robert Jack in 1914, who later pioneered radio broadcasting in New Zealand.

A bequest to the university by watchmaker, mathematician, and inventor Arthur Beverly in 1907 funds undergraduate bursaries.

The Beverly Clock—created in 1864—runs on daily temperature/pressure variations and has been in continuous operation (with minimal interruptions) in the since 1907. The Beverly Clock is currently based in the physics building.

Historical innovations

- In 1921 Robert Jack transmitted New Zealand’s first radio broadcast.
- In 1959–1960 Jack Dodd developed the theory of quantum beats.
- In 1998, an Otago team led by Andrew Wilson produced the first Bose–Einstein condensate in the southern hemisphere.
- In 2008, Ashton Bradley provided the theory for the first observation of spontaneous vortex production in a Bose-Einstein condensate using c-field theory.
- In 2010, the group of Mikkel Andersen used laser light to capture a single atom with high probability.
- In 2016 Blair Blakie predicted the formation of stable quantum droplets of ultra-cold magnetic gases.
- In 2021 Amita Deb and Niels Kjaergaard observed effects of the Pauli exclusion principle in light scattering.

== Teaching ==
- Core Physics papers at 100 level are PHSI131, PHSI132, PHSI191; see also ASTR101, and JumpStart Physics
- The department also hosts the Sustainable Energy Programme, starting at 200 level
- PHSI191 Biological Physics is one of the largest Physics courses in the southern hemisphere, with 1400-1600 students

== Research strengths ==
The department has research efforts in

- Quantum & Atomic Physics
- Geophysics, Space & Climate Science
- Sustainable Energy Science and Technology
- Astronomy and Astrophysics
- Inference & Instrumentation
- Theory of Bose-Einstein condensation: Non-equilibrium field theory, quantum turbulence, quantum droplets and supersolids
- Theoretical & Computational Physics

The University hosts The Dodd-Walls Centre for Photonic and Quantum Technologies (Māori: Te Whai Ao), named after New Zealand physicists Jack Dodd and Dan Walls. The University also hosts the Quantum Technologies Aotearoa a national multi-institution research program focused on advancement quantum technology.

== Notable staff ==
- Agnes Blackie, New Zealand's first female physics lecturer
- Richard Blaikie, T. K. Sidey Medal, Hector Medal
- Jack Dodd, Hector Medal
- Richard Dowden, Mechaelis Medal, T. K. Sidey Medal, Australian Antarctic Division Medal
- Crispin Gardiner, Honorary Dr. Rer. Nat. from the University of Innsbruck
- David Hutchinson, Thomson Medal recipient
- Pat Langhorne, New Zealand Antarctic Medal
