= University of Otago College of Education =

College of the University of Otago

Coordinates: 45.86742°S 170.52020°E

The University of Otago College of Education is a teacher-training facility that is part of the University of Otago in Dunedin, New Zealand. It was formed on 1 January 2007 through a merger of the University of Otago's Faculty of Education with the Dunedin College of Education. The College of Education's main campus is in Dunedin but it has a satellite campus in Invercargill.

== Location ==
The University of Otago College of Education operates from its own campus close to, but not contiguous with, the main university campus, opposite Logan Park in Dunedin North. Between them, the University of Otago, Dunedin College of Education, Otago Polytechnic, Otago School of Medicine, and Otago School of Dentistry form one large extended campus which covers some 80 hectares of Dunedin North. The college shares some facilities with the polytechnic, which lies immediately to its northwest. The college's location in Dunedin is significant, as that city has long had a history of education pioneering in New Zealand, with the country's first university, first medical school, first kindergarten, and first single-sex high school for girls.

== History ==
The College of Education's predecessor was the Dunedin College of Education, which was founded in 1876 and is the oldest teacher training facility in New Zealand. The University of Otago began providing teacher training courses in 1905. In 1976, the University of Otago and the College of Education introduced a joint Bachelor of Education (BEd) programme which included jointly taught BA and BEd courses. This co-operation continued until tertiary education reforms of the mid-1990s, after which the university offered its own B.Ed. degree course.

In 2002, the Dunedin College of Education and the University of Otago entered into talks to merge the two institutions to avoid the duplication of teaching courses and programs. In August 2006, the Tertiary Education Minister Michael Cullen formally approved the merger of the two educational institutions, stating that it would come into effect in January 2007. As a result of these changes, the newly formed University of Otago College of Education acquired the former assets of the Dunedin College of Education including its Dunedin and Invercargill campuses and the Robertson Library, which is shared with Otago Polytechnic.
