= Raechel Laing =

New Zealand clothing and textiles academic

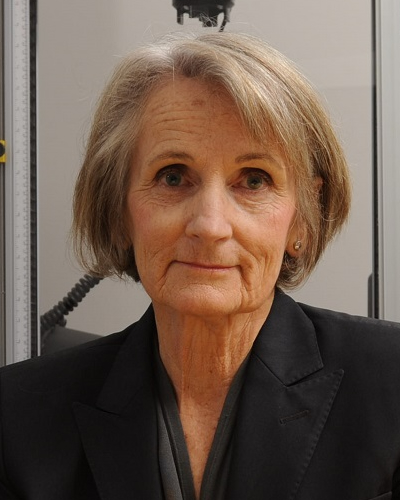
- Laing in 2009
- Education: University of Otago
- Scientific career
- Fields: Clothing and textiles
- Workplaces: University of Otago
- Thesis: The lockstitch seam : a model of the geometric structure and tensile behaviour (1987)

Raechel Margaret Laing is a New Zealand clothing and textiles academic. She is currently a professor emeritus at the University of Otago.

== Academic career ==
After a 1987 PhD titled The lockstitch seam : a model of the geometric structure and tensile behaviour at the University of Otago, she taught at Otago, rising to full professor.

Laing's research is focused on clothing and has received media attention. In 1997 she was awarded the Holden Medal for Education from the Textile Institute followed by the Institute Medal - their oldest award.

== Selected works ==
- MacRae, Braid A., James D. Cotter, and Raechel M. Laing. "Compression garments and exercise." Sports medicine 41, no. 10 (2011): 815–843.
- Wilson, C. A., B. J. Taylor, R. M. Laing, S. M. Williams, E. A. Mitchell, and New Zealand Cot Death Study Group. "Clothing and bedding and its relevance to sudden infant death syndrome: further results from the New Zealand Cot Death Study." Journal of Paediatrics and Child Health 30, no. 6 (1994): 506–512.
- Webster, J., E. J. Holland, G. Sleivert, R. M. Laing, and B. E. Niven. "A light-weight cooling vest enhances performance of athletes in the heat." Ergonomics (journal) 48, no. 7 (2005): 821–837.
- Laing, Raechel M., Elizabeth J. Holland, Cheryl A. Wilson, and Brian E. Niven. "Development of sizing systems for protective clothing for the adult male." Ergonomics (journal) 42, no. 10 (1999): 1249–1257.
- McQueen, Rachel H., Raechel M. Laing, Heather JL Brooks, and Brian E. Niven. "Odor intensity in apparel fabrics and the link with bacterial populations." Textile Research Journal 77, no. 7 (2007): 449–456.
