= Robertson Library =

Education library in Dunedin, New Zealand

Coordinates: 45.8672°S 170.5189°E

The Robertson Library in 2026

The Robertson Library (formerly the Bill Robertson Library) is a shared library run by the University of Otago's College of Education and Otago Polytechnic in Dunedin, New Zealand. It is named after Bill Robertson, who taught at Otago Polytech and also chaired the College of Education Council and the Otago Education Board. The Robertson Library also shares books and resources with Otago Polytechnic's Central Campus in Cromwell, Central Otago and International Campus in Auckland.

== Description ==
The Union Street East library houses The Robertson Library's major collections and is used mostly by staff and students from the University of Otago College of Education (formerly the Dunedin Teachers' College) and Otago Polytechnic. The library was inherited by the University of Otago when The University of Otago's Faculty of Education merged with the Dunedin College of Education in 2007. It underwent a $10 million refurbishment between January and September 2010, with the help of a $6.25 million government grant.
