= Agnes Blackie =

New Zealand physics lecturer (1897–1975)

- Born: 12 July 1897; New Zealand
- Died: 18 February 1975 (aged 77)
- Citizenship: New Zealand
- Occupation: Physics lecturer
- Employer: University of Otago
- Known for: First female physics academic in New Zealand

Agnes Randall Blackie (12 July 1897 – 18 February 1975) was New Zealand's first female physics lecturer and probably the Southern Hemisphere's only female physics academic at the time of her appointment.

== Early life ==
Blackie was born in New Zealand on 12 July 1897 to parents Jeanetta Margaret and the Reverend James Blackie. James Blackie was a Presbyterian minister, who had been an early student at the University of Otago, and the first graduate of the Theological Hall, while Jeanetta was the first Principal of the Presbyterian Women's Training Institute, later known as Deaconess College. James Blackie died in 1897, the year that Agnes was born.

== University of Otago ==
Encouraged by her mother to attend university, Blackie worked in the University of Otago's Department of Physics from 1919, when she was appointed as an assistant lecturer, to sometime after her retirement in 1958.

Blackie wrote about her experiences as a student and lecturer. Her papers are included in the Blackie family papers in the Hocken Collections. Of her subject, she said “I can't imagine a better subject for a lecturer. Brimful of interest, it illumines and explains the world of everyday experience yet leads out in the furthest realms of space and inwards to the intriguing mysteries of the very small.” She described the practical demonstrations she would do during lectures as fun, and also gave public lectures. She was known to take particular care of female students, often inviting them for afternoon tea at her home. In 1951, Blackie published a guide for her first year students.

Blackie died on 18 February 1975.

== Recognition ==
In 1978, a group of former students donated money to create an award in Blackie's honour. The Agnes Randall Blackie Memorial Prize is awarded in her honour annually in the Department of Physics at the University of Otago, to up to three students achieving the highest grades in 100-Level Physics, and intending to continue studying at a higher level in Biology, Health or Life Sciences.

In 2017, Blackie was selected as one of the Royal Society Te Apārangi's 150 women in 150 words, celebrating the contribution of women to knowledge in New Zealand.

The Dodd-Walls Centre awarded the inaugural Agnes Blackie Memorial Research Fellowship on the centenary of Blackie's appointment as the first female physics lecturer in New Zealand. The recipient was Jami Shepherd (Johnson).
