= Alice Copping =

New Zealand nutritionist

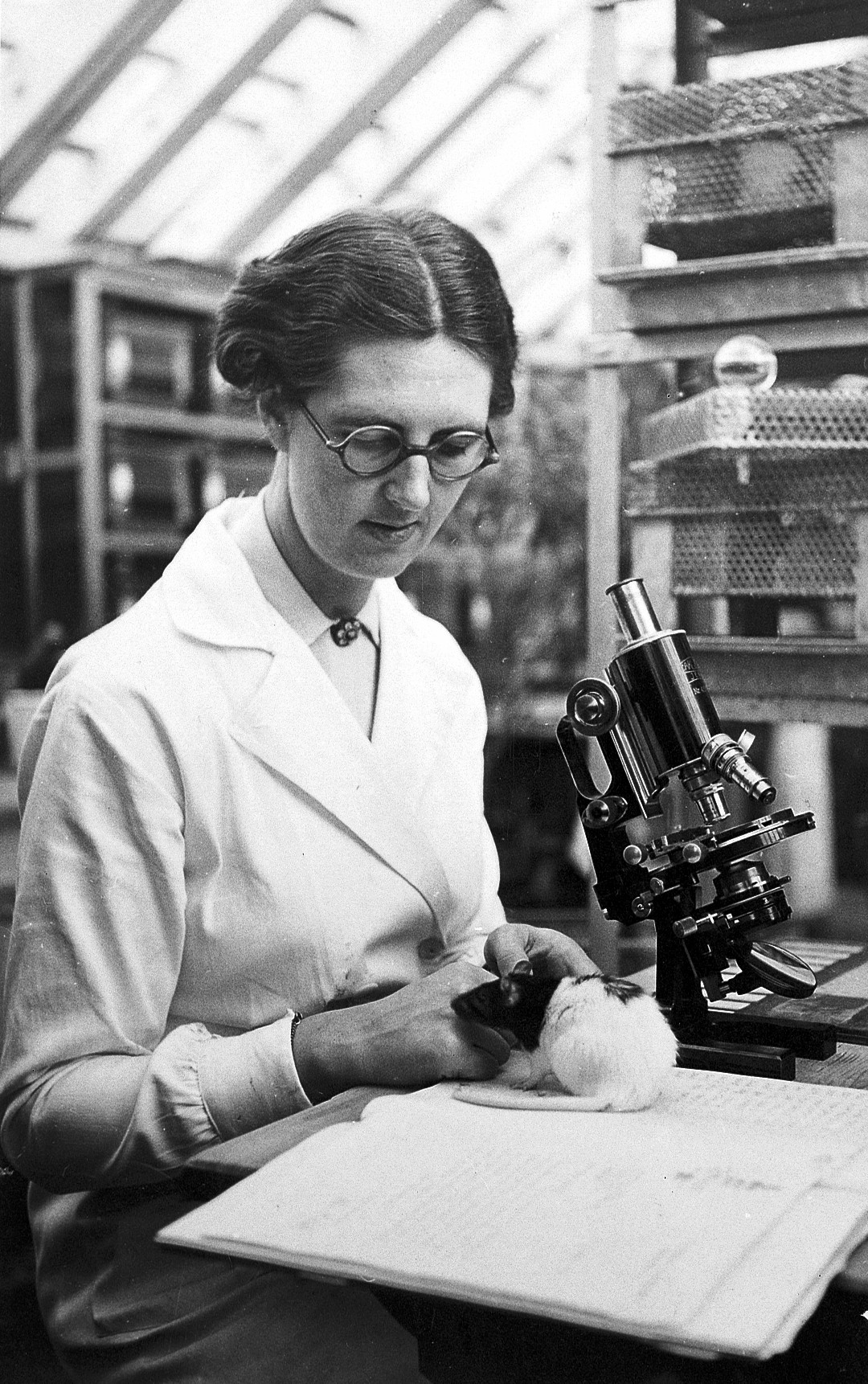
Alice Copping

Alice Copping (14 May 1906 – 16 January 1996) was senior lecturer in nutrition, Queen Elizabeth College, University of London. She was born in Stratford, New Zealand.

Copping attended Victoria University of Wellington, New Zealand, and graduated as Master of Science in 1926. She was awarded the Sarah Ann Rhodes scholarship the following year, and did two years of research work under J. C. Drummond at University College London. She then returned to New Zealand to lecture at the School of Home Science, University of Otago for a year, before returning to London to work in the Division of Nutrition at the Lister Institute.

Copping was employed as the editorial assistant of the periodical Nutrition Abstracts and Reviews from its inception in 1931, and for a period of nearly 20 years worked solidly for the Institute on research on topics such as Vitamin B complex, bread and wheat products, and wartime diets.

In 1949 she was employed on the staff of Queen Elizabeth College, and became a senior lecturer during her time there. Copping was a consultant on nutrition education for the Food and Agriculture Organization/World Health Organization symposium in 1959, and in 1961 acted as chairman of programme for the Third International Congress of Dietetics in London.
