= Tania Lineham =

New Zealand science teacher

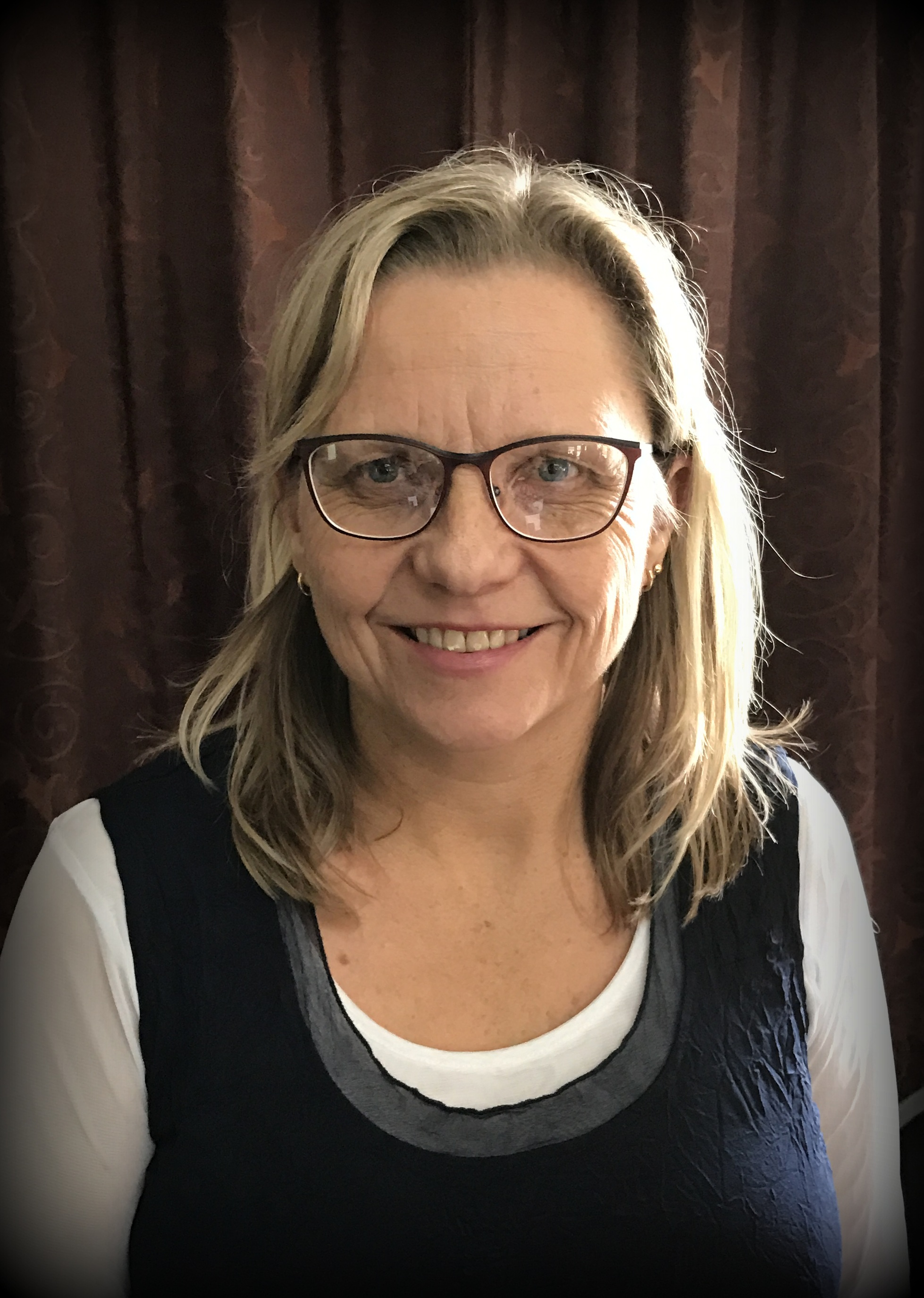
- Lineham in 2016
- Born: 1966; Eketāhuna, Wairarapa, New Zealand
- Died: 11 April 2018 (age 52); Auckland, New Zealand
- Education: Bachelor of Science, Otago University; PG Dip Ed (Distinction) in Education Leadership
- Occupations: Science teacher, educator
- Awards: Royal Society of New Zealand Science and Technology Teacher Fellowship 1999 Prime Minister's Science Teacher Prize 2015

Tania Jane Lineham (1966 – 11 April 2018) was a New Zealand science teacher and educator who won the 2015 Prime Minister’s Science Teacher Prize.

== Career ==
Tania Lineham taught science at James Hargest College in Invercargill, New Zealand, from 1990. She was awarded a Royal Society of New Zealand Science and Technology Teacher Fellowship in 1999 and the Prime Minister’s Science Teacher Prize in 2015. She had been a member of the Southland Science and Technology Fair Committee since 1991 and chief judge in 2014 and 2015. Lineham co-authored the Year Ten Science Study Guide for New Zealand students.

== 1999 Royal Society NZ Science and Technology Fellowship ==
The Royal Society administers these fellowships to enable up to 25 teachers each year to be released from school to participate in programmes with industry and research institutions. Lineham was one of 18 recipients and worked with the Southland Regional Council in their Adopt a Stream Program. The program encouraged schools to adopt a section of stream. Specially developed classroom and field activities and materials increased students' understanding and awareness of river issues.

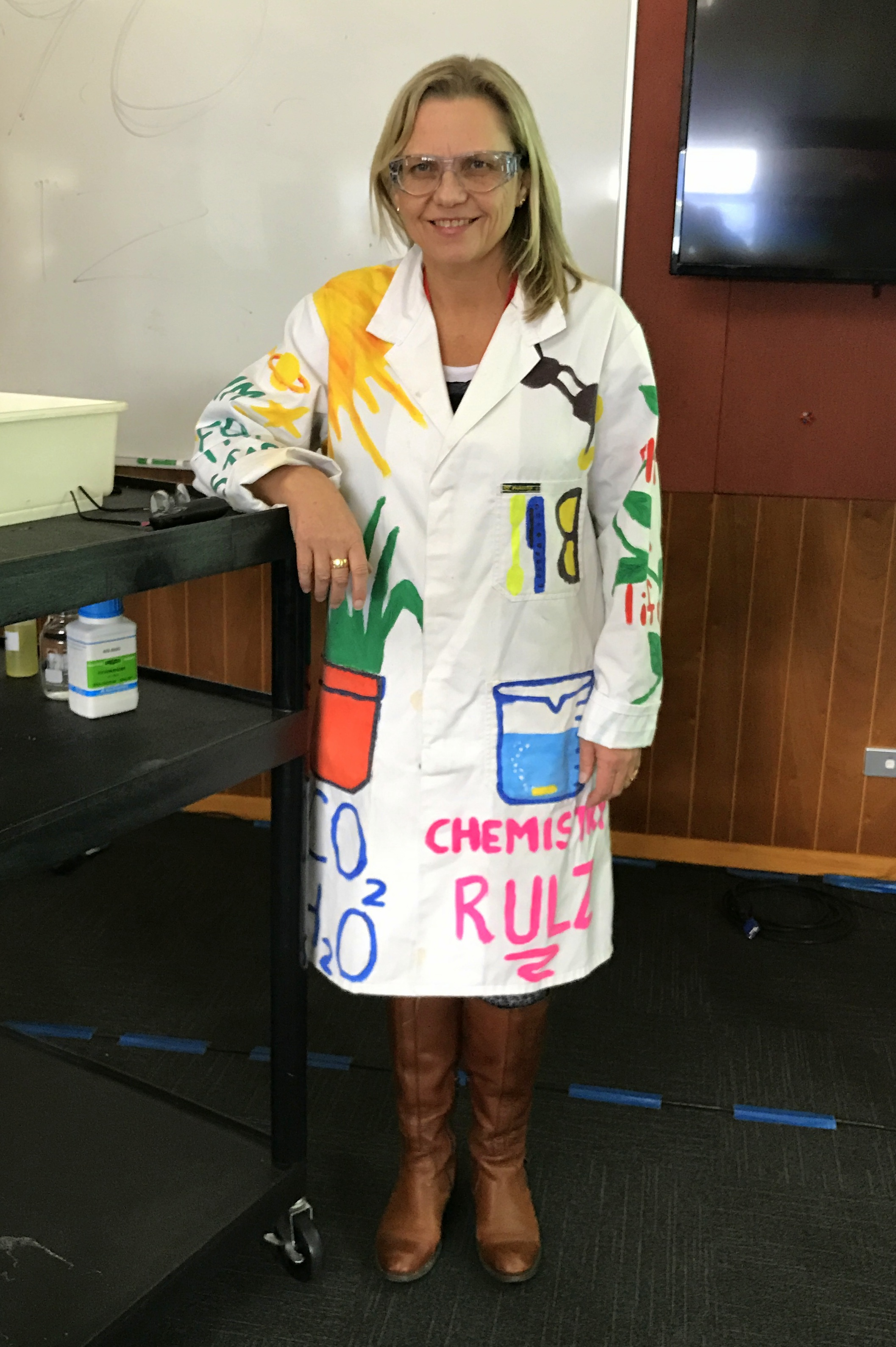
Lineham in teaching mode – 2016

== 2015 Prime Minister’s Science Teacher Prize ==
Lineham won the Prime Minister's Science Teacher Prize in 2015. The New Zealand Government introduced these prizes in 2009 to raise the profile and prestige of science among New Zealanders. The Prime Minister’s Science Teacher Prize is awarded to "A registered teacher who has been teaching science, mathematics, technology, pūtaiao, hangarau or pāngarau learning areas of the New Zealand curriculum to school-age children in a primary, intermediate or secondary New Zealand registered school." The award was for a number of aspects of Lineham's work: her mentoring of gifted and able students, but also for her efforts to make science valuable and engaging to all students. Her students have excelled in local, national and international science events. In addition she was recognised for her professional development and collegiate sharing.

== Teaching philosophy ==
Lineham believed that students have to be engaged, and to do that, science has to be fun. Explosions and fizzing chemicals are part of the strategy to engage students. She maintained that one of the crucial skills teachers should nurture in 21st century students is the ability to think critically.

"There is so much material out there that looks real but isn’t, especially on the internet. Part of my focus is on giving young people the tools they need to assess and analyse the wealth of scientific claims that are made to legitimise beliefs and products. It’s so easy to be ripped off – I don’t see how anyone can survive in the 21st century without some degree of scientific literacy."

— Tania Lineham,

During a 2015 podcast on Radio NZ Lineham explained that she and her colleagues had developed a science curriculum at James Hargest College to give students tools to make informed decisions, to critically analyse pseudoscience, to be able to identify hoaxes on the internet and to be good digital citizens.

Lineham spoke at the New Zealand Skeptics Conference in Queenstown in December 2016.

== Personal life ==
Lineham suffered from primary sclerosing cholangitis, a chronic disease that damages the liver. She received a liver transplant on Christmas Eve, 1995 in Brisbane, Australia. In rare cases the disease also affects the transplant organ and in 2017, twenty-two years after the first transplant she needed another. Lineham died on 11 April 2018, just three months after her second liver transplant.
