= Otago Boys' High School =

Location
- 2 Arthur Street; Dunedin; Otago 9016; New Zealand; 45.871597°S 170.495051°E

Information
- Type: State secondary, day and boarding
- Motto: Latin: Recti Cultus Pectora Roborant ("The ‘right’ learning builds a heart of oak")
- Established: 3 August 1863; 163 years ago
- Sister school: Otago Girls' High School
- Ministry of Education Institution no.: 377
- Rector: Richard Hall
- Gender: Boys
- Enrolment: 862 (July 2026)
- Houses: Aspinall; McIndoe; Park; Saxton
- Socio-economic decile: 9Q
- School Song: Follow Up Otago High
- Website: obhs.school.nz
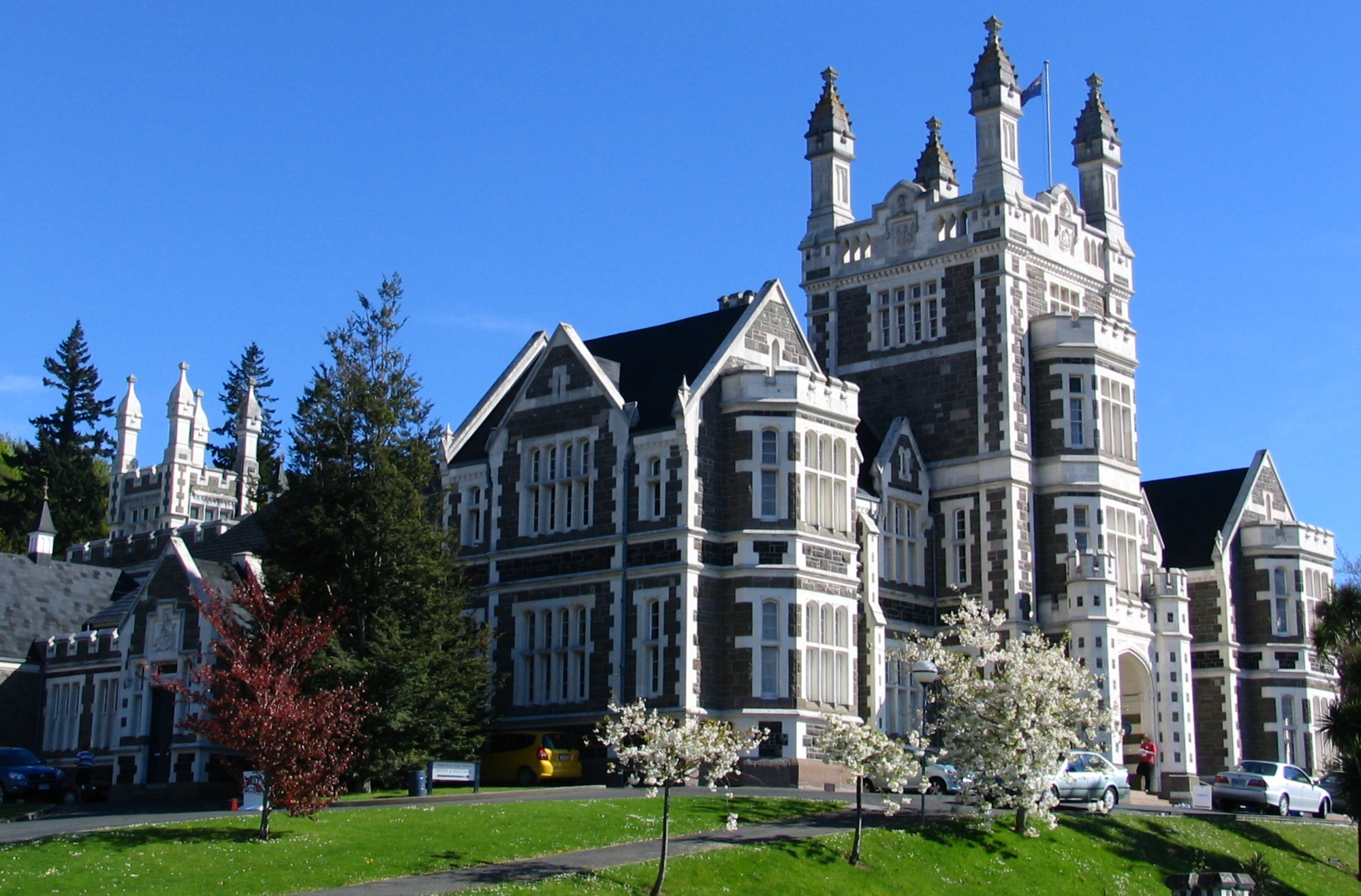
- Central block

Otago Boys' High School (OBHS) is a secondary school in Dunedin, New Zealand. It is one of New Zealand's oldest boys' secondary schools. Originally known as Dunedin High School, it was founded on 3 August 1863 and moved to its present site in 1885. The main building was designed by Robert Lawson and is regarded as one of the finest Gothic Revival structures in the country. Situated on high ground above central Dunedin it commands excellent views of the city and is a prominent landmark.

Otago Girls' High School now occupies the original site in Tennyson Street, closer to the centre of the city and is Otago Boys' sister school.

The school owns a lodge in Mount Aspiring National Park, and has regular field trips for students.

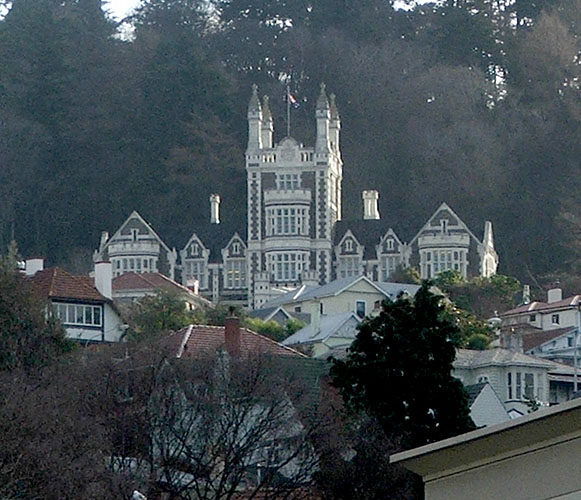
The school's buildings can be seen from much of central Dunedin.

On 24 November 1864, a petition bearing 54 signatures was presented to the New Zealand House of Representatives, seeking official recognition for Dunedin High School's cadet corps (the ‘memorialists’) as members of the colonial Volunteer Force. The petition was received by William Reynolds on behalf of the House.

== Building history ==
The school opened on its present site in Arthur Street in 1885. The Main Tower Block was designed by Robert Lawson and built for £14,800 in blue stone, Port Chalmers breccia and Oamaru stone by W A Carlton. It has long been regarded as a fine design and is listed as a Category I Historic Place.

The foundation rector, Thomas Campbell, was a graduate of St John's College, Cambridge, and headmaster of Wolverhampton Grammar School. He arrived with his family in Deborah Bay on 3 July 1863, and took the steamer Pride of Yarra for Dunedin the following day. The steamer collided with the Favorite off Kilgour Point, and sank with the loss of 13 lives, among them the entire Campbell party, consisting of Thomas Campbell, his wife, five children aged 5 weeks to 5 years, and their two servants.

Two other masters were appointed at the same time as Campbell. The English master was George P. Abram, a Senior Scholar and Prizeman of Clare College, Cambridge, and Second Master of Wolverhampton Grammar School. Daniel Brent, a Senior Scholar and Prizeman of Queens' College, Cambridge, and a Mathematical master of Tonbridge School, was appointed Mathematical Master. After Mr Campbell's death, Abram filled in as principal until another appointment could be made.

The school opened 3 August 1863 with Abram as principal and a roll of 80 pupils. In May 1864, the Reverend F. C. Simmons, of Lincoln College, Oxford, and Head-master of the Dundee Proprietary School, arrived to take up the position of Rector.

Increasing roll numbers from 1903 led to the opening of the Shand Building in 1914, designed by Edmund Anscombe. He was also responsible for the Rectory, 1913, the principal's onsite residence. The Shand Building, originally called "Shand Hall" cost 3,600 pounds. The following year it was extended to a design by Harry Mandeno (1879–1972). A memorial arch at the entrance to the grounds, built in blue stone and Oamaru stone and designed by Leslie Coombs (1885–1952) was unveiled in 1923. In 1920 the Fulton Building provided six additional classrooms, but this has since been replaced with the gymnasium complex and rehoused swimming pool designed by E.J. Ted McCoy as part of the later major restoration and redevelopment of the school's buildings.

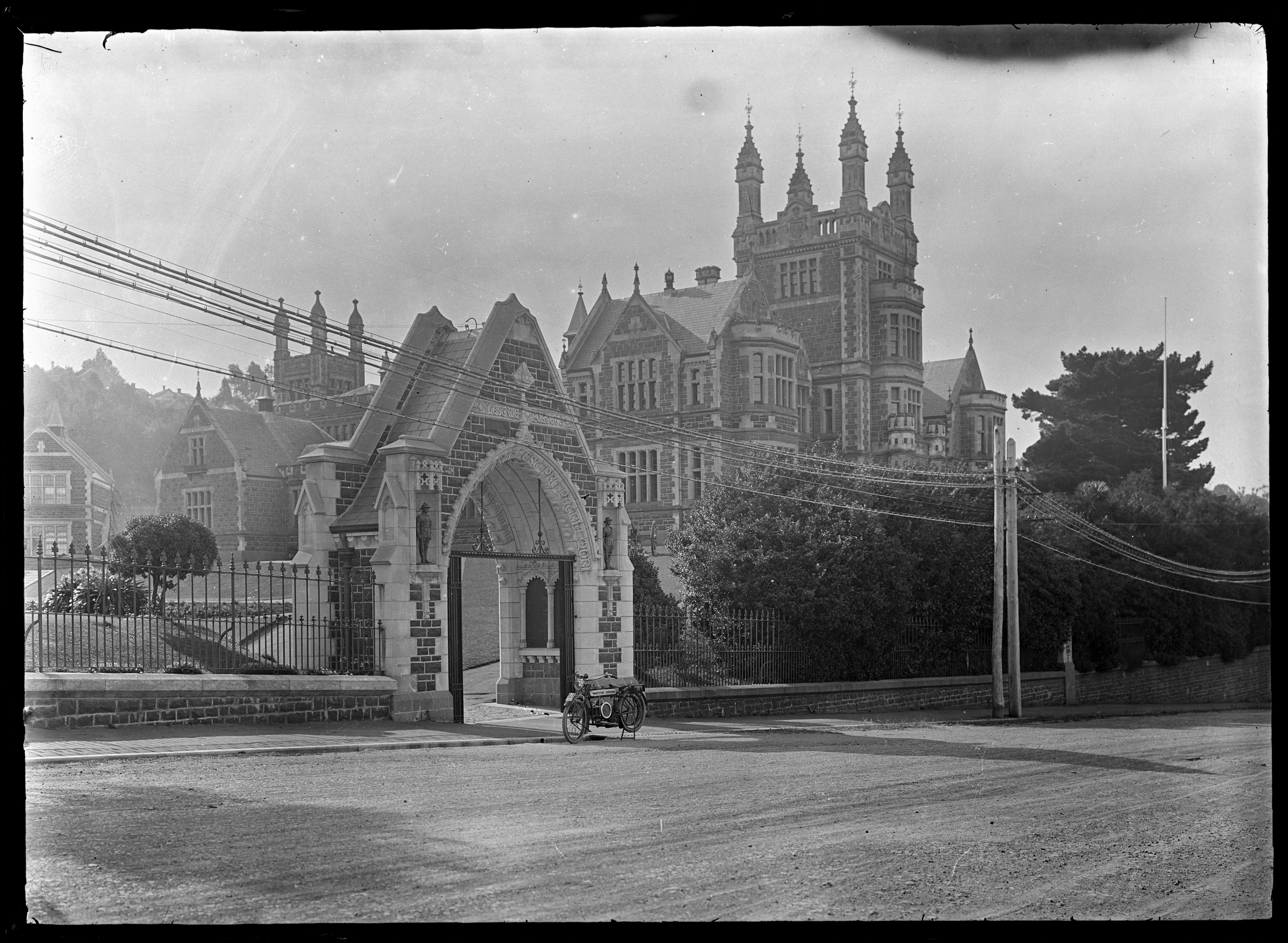
Ca. 1925 street view of the high school by Albert Percy Godber

There is a teaching block, named after a former Rector, Mr. W.J. Morrell, which was erected in 1961 to a standard Ministry of Works design, though contextualised with blue stone fascias by the architect Ian R McAllum. A grandstand with similar fascias on its rearward elevation forms part of a quadrangle, with the Morrell building, behind the Lawson building. This was also designed by McAllum and built from 1962 to 1963. It has a cantilevered, multiple-gabled canopy added in 1964. Specialist science laboratories designed by Angus Black were constructed in 1967 and were named after the pioneering plastic surgeon Sir Archibald McIndoe, an Old Boy of the school. Mr D J MacLachlan, Rector from 1963 to 1985, worked tirelessly for the construction of the main teaching block which now bears his name.

This is part of the major restoration and redevelopment which saw the refurbishment of the Main Tower Block, the central feature of which is the Maurice Joel Theatre. It also involved the construction of several large new buildings, forming a new quadrangle around the former Green in the greatest expansion of the complex since the 1880s. This considerable undertaking, designed by E.J. Ted McCoy was completed in 1983.

Lawson's tower block is composed in the Scottish Baronial style, taking its inspiration from the 16th-century tower houses. McCoy's blue stone aggregate and fair face concrete echo its materials, with gun slot windows intended to reference the Maginot Line and the old building's military theme. The new buildings are set below the old so the latter take visual pre-eminence from a distance. The project won the architect a National Award from the New Zealand Institute of Architects, and is noted as an architectural mixture of old and modern techniques.

== Enrolment ==
As of July 2026, Otago Boys' High School has roll of 862 students, of which 135 (15.7%) identify as Māori.

As of 2026, Otago Boys' High School has an Equity Index of 432, placing it amongst schools whose students have below average socioeconomic barriers to achievement (roughly equivalent to deciles 8 and 9 under the former socio-economic decile system).

== Houses ==
In 2012 Otago Boys' High School introduced the house system. Every year the four houses compete in competitions to win the annual House Competition. The main events are athletics, cross country, the haka competition and a school song competition. Smaller competitions also pop up during the year including the can drive, the car jam and other events.

- Aspinall (Yellow) – Named after John Aspinall, an old boy and donator of the Aspinall lodge used for camps
- McIndoe (Red) – Named after Sir Archibald McIndoe, an old boy and surgeon who treated and rehabilitated the Royal Air Force during World War II
- Park (Blue) – Named after Sir Keith Park, an old boy and officer of the Royal Air Force who was vital to the Luftwaffe's defeat in the Battle of Britain
- Saxton (White) – Named after Charlie Saxton, an old boy who played for the All Blacks in 1938

== See also ==
- List of schools in New Zealand

== Sources ==
- T.J. Arnold (et al.), Centennial Publication Otago Boys' High School Old Boys' Register, Dunedin: NZ; Otago High School Old Boys' Society (Inc.), 1963.
- G.J. Griffiths, Alfred Eccles, E.J. McCoy, Otago Boys' High and its historic neighbourhood, Dunedin: NZ; Otago Heritage Books, 1983.
- Sweetman, Rory (2013). Above the City: A history of Otago Boys' High School 1863–2013. Dunedin: Otago Boys' High School Foundation. ISBN 9780473247720.
