= William John Morrell =

New Zealand academic

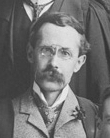
- Morrell in 1903
- Born: 1868; Tiverton, England, United Kingdom
- Died: 1945 (aged 76–77)
- Education: Balliol College, Oxford
- Occupation: Educator

William John Morrell MA (1868–1945) was a Chancellor of Otago University, Dunedin, New Zealand.

== Early life ==
Morrell was born in Tiverton, Devon, England, in 1868, and educated at Blundell's School and Balliol College, Oxford, where he held an open classical scholarship. In 1887, he gained a first class in Classical Moderations.

== Teaching ==
He held various teaching positions in England including the Chief Classical Master at Trent College, Nottinghamshire, before migrating to New Zealand in 1897, to take up the position of Chief Classical and English Master at the Auckland Grammar School, where he rose to the position of First Assistant Master.

In 1907 he was appointed Rector of Otago Boys' High School, Dunedin, and thus began a long association with the Morrell family and the city of Dunedin. A teaching block there is named after him.

In 1908 Dunedin public library was opened. Morrell was associated with its development for more than twenty years and served on the first Library Committee of the Dunedin City Council. He was also active in the establishment of the Hocken Collections, at Otago University.

Morrell was appointed Chancellor of Otago University, in 1933, a position he held for 12 years.

== Family ==
In 1897, he married Agnes Mary Tucker. Professor William Parker Morrell was the eldest of their four children, and their only son. Their daughters Ethel and Katherine were local teachers and active with many local societies.
