= University of Otago =

Public university in New Zealand

- Ōtākou Whakaihu Waka (Māori)
- Coat of arms
- Latin: Universitas Otagensis
- Other name: Otago University
- Motto: Sapere aude (Latin)
- Motto in English: Dare to be wise
- Type: Public research collegiate university
- Established: 1869; 157 years ago
- Affiliations: MNU
- Endowment: NZD $279.9 million (31 December 2021)
- Budget: NZD $756.8 million (31 December 2020)
- Chancellor: Trish Oakley
- Vice-Chancellor: Grant Robertson
- Academic staff: 1,499 (2025)
- Administrative staff: 2,476 (2025)
- Students: 21,295 (2025)
- Undergraduates: 16,628 (2025)
- Postgraduates: 3,661 (2025)
- Doctoral students: 1,469 (2025)
- Location: Dunedin, Otago, New Zealand; 45°51′56″S 170°30′50″E
- Campus: Urban/University town 45 hectares (110 acres)
- Student Magazine: Critic
- Colours: Dunedin Blue and Gold
- Website: otago.ac.nz

The University of Otago (Māori: Ōtākou Whakaihu Waka) is a public research collegiate university based in Dunedin, Otago, New Zealand. It was established by ordinance of the Otago Provincial Council in 1869 and opened for teaching in 1871, making it New Zealand's oldest university. Between 1874 and 1961 Otago was part of the University of New Zealand and conferred degrees in its name. In July 2023 the university adopted the Māori identity Ōtākou Whakaihu Waka as part of a major rebrand, with the changes taking effect from May 2024.

As of 2024, Universities New Zealand reported a student headcount of 21,315 (18,564 equivalent full-time students). The university is centred on its Dunedin City campus and teaches across additional campuses in Christchurch and Wellington for health sciences.

Otago is known for student culture associated with "Scarfies", a nickname derived from wearing scarves in Dunedin's cold winters, and for a long-running tradition of naming student flats. In recent years, local media have noted the slang term "breather" among students. The graduation ceremonies traditionally include the singing of Gaudeamus igitur (Let us rejoice while we are young).

== History ==
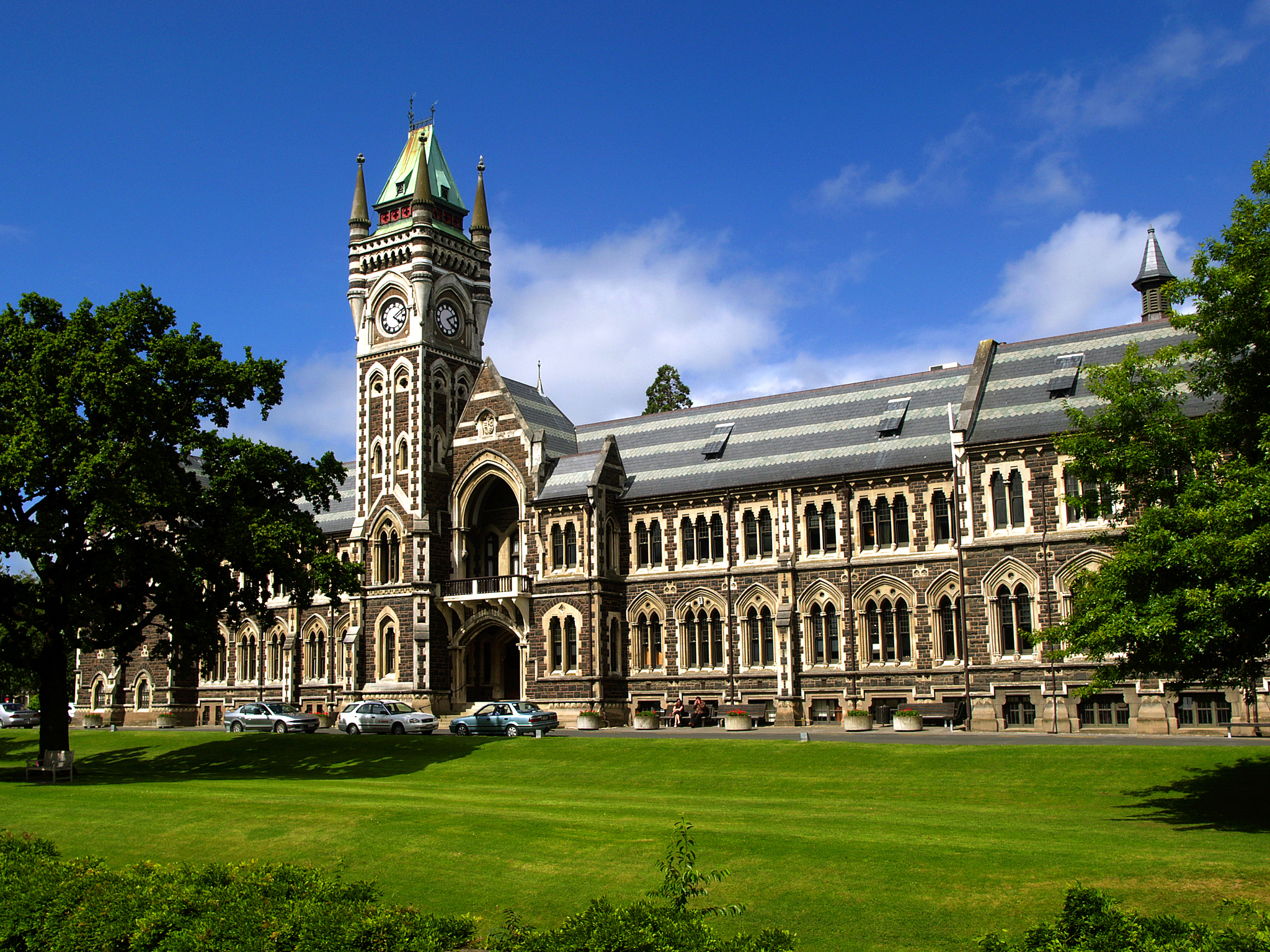
The Registry Building (Clocktower Building), looking east.

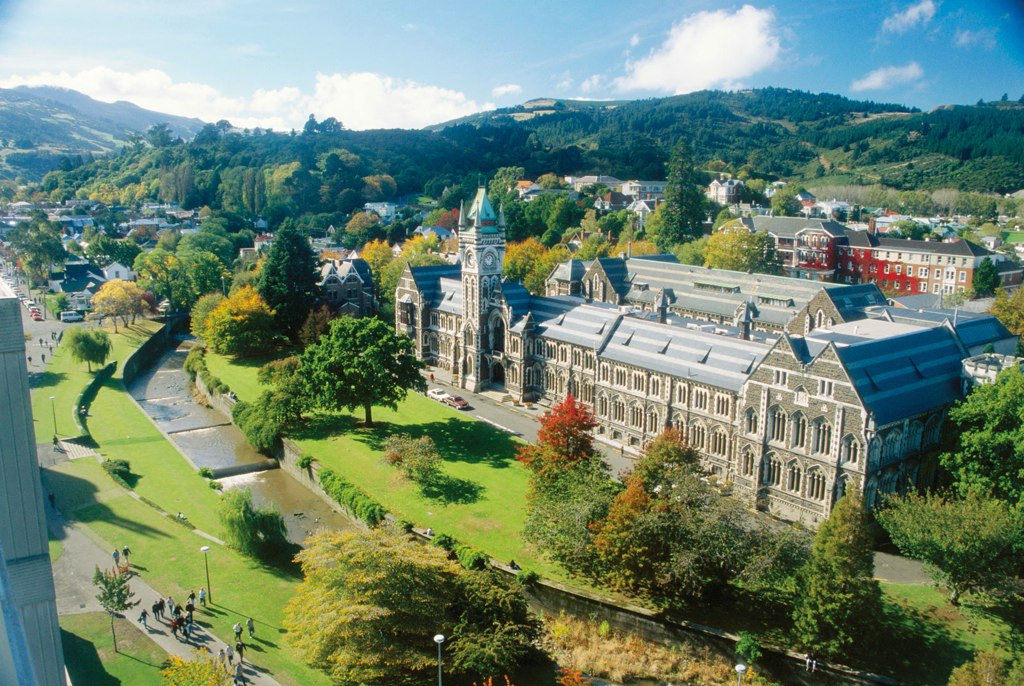
Aerial view of the Dunedin campus. The Water of Leith runs through in the centre.

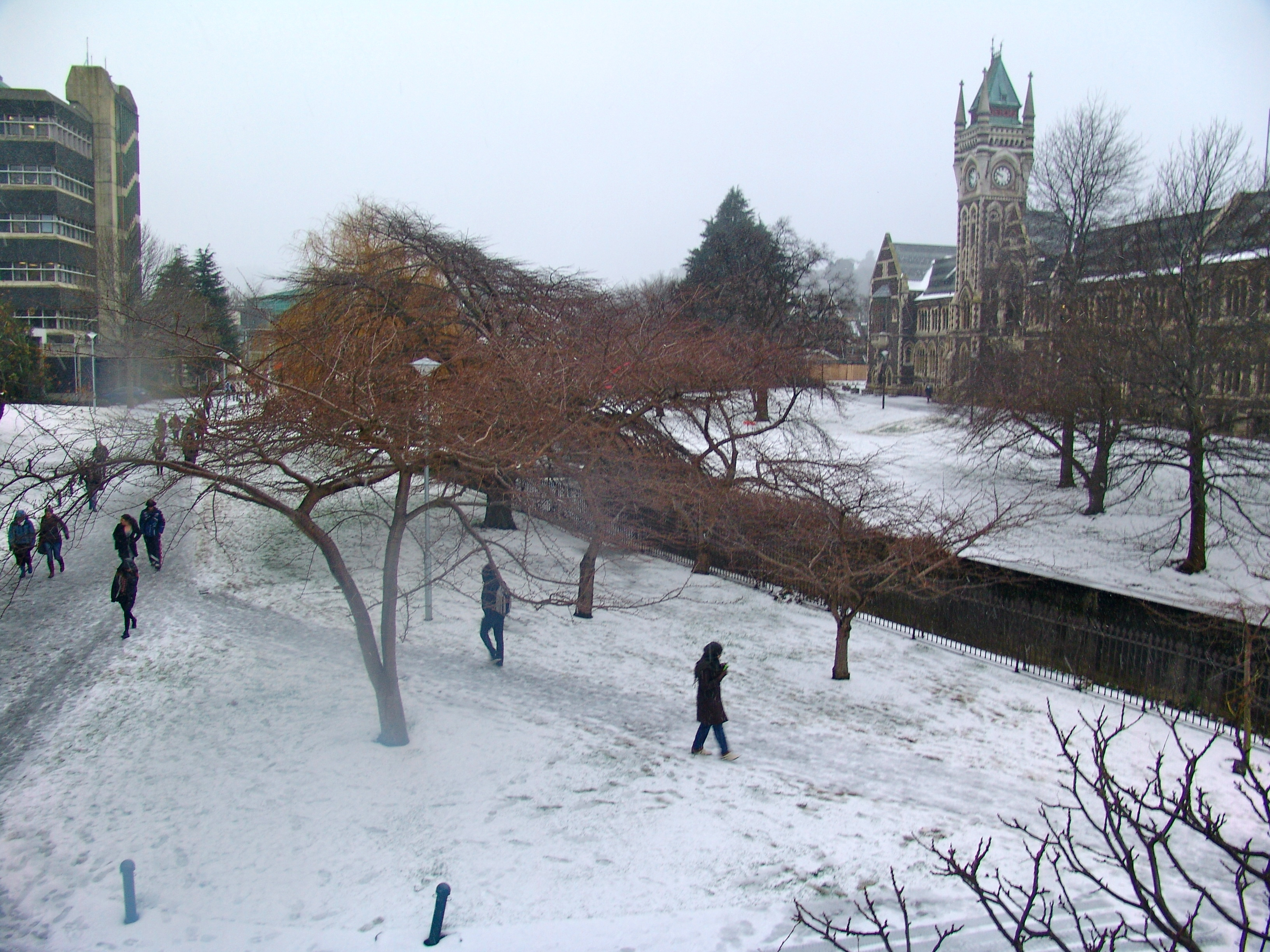
Dunedin campus in winter - unusually thick snowfall

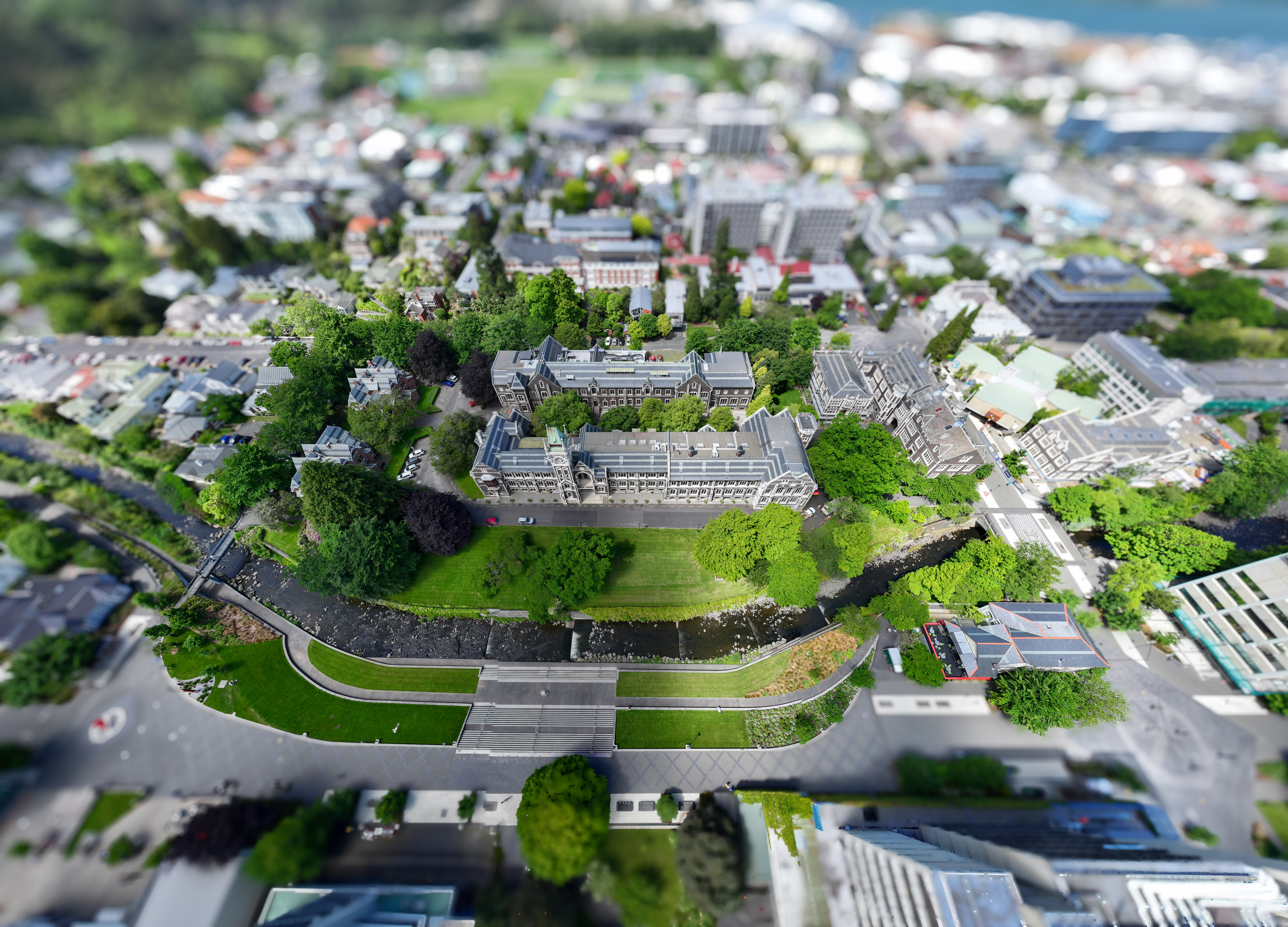
Aerial shot over the University of Otago, Dunedin. 2024

Logo of the University of Otago used until 2024

=== 19th century ===
The Otago Association's plan for the European settlement of southern New Zealand, conceived under the principles of Edward Gibbon Wakefield in the 1840s, envisaged a university.

Dunedin leaders Thomas Burns and James Macandrew urged the Otago Provincial Council during the 1860s to set aside a land endowment for an institute of higher education. An ordinance of the council established the university in 1869, giving it 100,000 acres (400 km^{2}) of land and the power to grant degrees in Arts, Medicine, Law and Music. Burns was named Chancellor but he did not live to see the university open on 5 July 1871.

The university conferred just one degree, to Alexander Watt Williamson, before becoming an affiliated college of the federal University of New Zealand in 1874. With the dissolution of the University of New Zealand in 1961 and the passage of the University of Otago Amendment Act 1961, the university resumed its power to confer degrees.

Originally operating from William Mason's Post Office building on Princes Street, it relocated to Maxwell Bury's Clocktower and Geology buildings in 1878 and 1879. This evolved into the Clocktower complex, a striking group of Gothic revival buildings at the heart of the campus. These buildings were inspired by the then-new main building at the University of Glasgow in Scotland.

Otago was the first university in Australasia to permit women to take a law degree. Ethel Benjamin graduated LLB in 1897. Later that year she became the first woman in the British Empire to appear as counsel in court.

=== 20th century ===
The University of Otago helped train medical personnel as part of the Otago University Medical Corps. They supplied or trained most of the New Zealand Army's doctors and dentists during the First World War.

Robert Jack made the first radio broadcast in New Zealand from the Department of Physics on 17 November 1921.

Queen Elizabeth II visited the university library with the Duke of Edinburgh on 18 March 1970. This was the first time the royals completed informal "walkabouts" to meet the public, and it was the first visit of Prince Charles (then 21 years old) and Princess Anne (19 years) to this country.

=== 21st century ===
In May 2010 the university joined the Matariki Network of Universities (MNU) together with Dartmouth College (US), Durham University (UK), Queen's University (Canada), University of Tübingen (Germany), University of Western Australia (Australia) and Uppsala University (Sweden).

Beginning in 2015 university Vice-Chancellor Harlene Hayne and Pro-Vice-Chancellor Tony Ballantyne implemented cuts in academic and support staff which generated enduring controversy. In this context The New Zealand Herald characterised the university's 'climate' as one of top-down 'suppression and fear' for its employees. The Otago Daily Times reported on 'demoralised teachers and researchers' who were 'locked in pain and anger at what their institution had become' and later opined that 'the university desperately needs a reset'. In 2020 the University of Otago announced that Hayne would be leaving the university and that Ballantyne would be given a new role, namely, leading the Division of External Engagement to attend to alumni relations and liaising with secondary schools, among other matters.

In December 2020, eight graduation ceremonies scheduled for that month were disrupted following threats to carry out a firearms and explosives attack on students attending graduation ceremonies scheduled for 7 and 8 December. On 18 December, a 22-year-old woman appeared in the Auckland District Court on charges of threatening harm to people or property. Court documents have described the threat as being of a "magnitude surpassing the 15 March Christchurch mosque massacres." On 14 July 2021, the woman, who has interim name suppression, admitted to threatening to carry out a firearms and explosives attack against Otago students. Her lawyer applied for a discharge without conviction. On 12 May 2022, the woman was sentenced to five months community detention and nine months intensive supervision. According to the University Chancellor, the bomb threat and subsequent cancellation of eight graduation ceremonies cost the University NZ$1.3 million.

In mid-April 2023, Otago University reported that it was facing a NZ$60 million deficit due to declining student enrolments and a shortfall in government funding. In response, acting vice-chancellor Helen Nicholson stated that the university was considering laying off several hundred staff members including academics. This marked the first time since its founding in 1878 that the university has faced a major debt crisis. According to the Otago Daily Times, the university had only started borrowing in mid-December 2022, incurring a year-end debt of NZ$30 million. While the university was able to come out of debt in January 2023 following a regular injection of government funding, the university subsequently incurred more debt in 2023 due to its capital programme of refurbishing existing buildings and building new buildings. In response, students staged a protest against the proposed cuts. Otago University Students Association president Quintin Jane also called on Education Minister Jan Tinetti to increase funding for universities. In late May 2023, the Otago Daily Times reported that the university had declined to inform staff of its NZ$60 million budget shortfall in November 2022. In late June 2023, the government announced a NZ$128 million funding injection for degree-level and postgraduate programmes for New Zealand universities and other tertiary institutions. In response, acting vice-chancellor Nicholson stated that the university would still proceed with job cuts since the funding would only come into effect from 2024 onwards.

In March 2024, Grant Robertson was designated as the next vice-chancellor, commencing July 2024. This announcement was accompanied by a 'major' 'almost wholesale' replacement of the university leadership. While university chancellor Stephen Higgs and the university council supported Robertson's appointment, there was mixed reception from donors. While some were supportive, several objected to appointing a former politician due to his non-academic background and record as finance minister. Several alumni also withheld donations and funding to Otago University following Robertson's appointment. In mid May 2024, the Otago Daily Times reported that donations to the University's Foundation Trust had declined from NZ$12.25 million in 2022 to NZ$7.09m in 2023. University development and alumni relations office director Shelagh Murray attributed the decline in donor funding to the ongoing impact of COVID-19, the economic recession and the cost-of-living crisis on individuals and businesses.

In early March 2026, the University confirmed plans to establish a new campus in Queenstown, including a range of undergraduate and postgraduate courses and a purpose-built student accommodation by 2030.

== Campuses and facilities ==
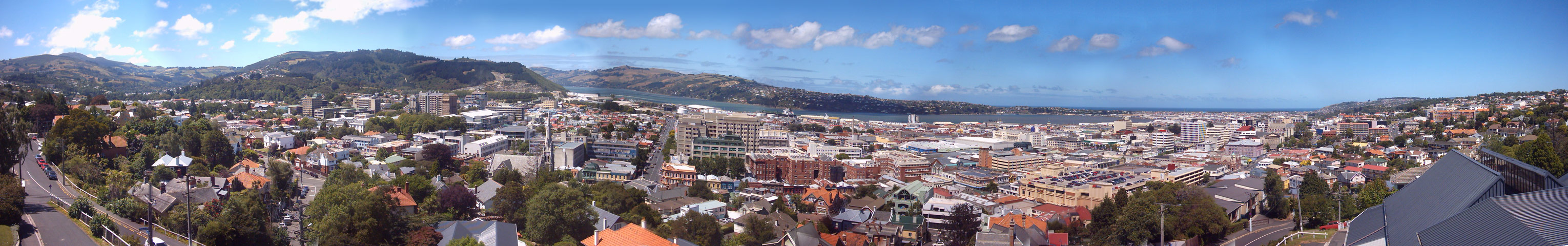
180° view of Dunedin shot from the hills on the west. The University can be seen in front of the large hill to the left.

=== Campuses ===
The University of Otago Registry Building

The University of Otago's main campus is in Dunedin, which hosts the Central Administration as well as its Health Sciences, Humanities, Business School, and Sciences divisions. The architectural grandeur and accompanying gardens of the main campus in Dunedin led to its being ranked as one of the world's most beautiful university campuses by the British newspaper The Daily Telegraph and American online news website The Huffington Post. In addition, the university has four satellite campuses in Auckland, Wellington, Christchurch, and Invercargill.

1. The Christchurch campus is based at the Christchurch School of Medicine and Health Science. It also provides medical and physiotherapy clinical training programs, research, distance education, and postgraduate programs.
2. The Wellington campus is based at the Wellington School of Medicine and Health Science. It also provides medical and physiotherapy clinical training programs, research, distance education, and postgraduate programs.
3. The Auckland campus is based at the Auckland Centre on Queen. The Auckland Centre provides various teaching and distance learning courses and serves as a liaison with the wider Auckland community and alumni.
4. The Southland Campus (Ahuahu Te Mātauranga) is a branch of the University of Otago College of Education. The campus provides a range of early childhood, primary, primary bilingual, and secondary teacher education programs.
5. The University of Otago's Department of Marine Science also operates the Portobello Marine Laboratory in the Otago peninsula.

=== Libraries ===
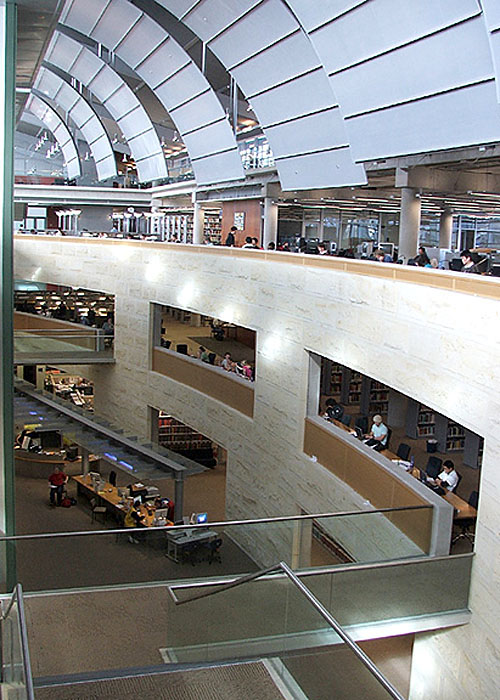
Interior of the Central Library

The University of Otago has nine libraries: six based in Dunedin on the main university campus, the education library in Southland, plus two medical libraries in Wellington and Christchurch. All libraries have wireless access.

==== Central Library ====
The Central Library is part of the Information Services Building and has over 2000 study spaces, 130 computer terminals, and laptop connections at 500 desks. It has Te Aka a Tāwhaki, a collection of Māori resources, and the Special Collections consisting of about 9,000 books printed before 1801. In total, the Central Library has over 800,000 print and electronic materials relating to the arts and humanities, commerce, education, physical education, social sciences, and technology. It was designed by the American architecture firm Hardy Holzman Pfeiffer and opened in 2001, replacing what was previously a 1960s-era modernist building.

==== Robert Stout Law Library ====
The Robert Stout Law Library is the university's law library and is based in the Richardson Building.

==== Health Sciences Library ====
The Health Sciences Library is in the Sayers Building, opposite the main entrance to Dunedin Hospital. The Health Sciences Library book collection only includes the last 10 years of content, but does have over 150,000 volumes, the vast majority of which are in storage. There is seating for over 400.

==== Science Library ====
The Science Library is at the north end of the campus in the Science III building, with seating for approximately 500.

==== Hocken Collections ====
The Hocken Collections is a research library, archive, and art gallery of national significance which is administered by the University of Otago. The library's specialist areas include items relating to the history of New Zealand and the Pacific, with specific emphasis on the Otago and Southland regions. The Hocken Collections was established in 1910 when Dunedin philanthropist Thomas Hocken donated his entire private collection to the University of Otago. It currently houses over 8,000 linear metres of archives and manuscripts. It is currently situated at the site of the former Otago Co-operative Dairy Company factory on Anzac Avenue, east of the main campus.

==== Robertson Library ====
The Robertson Library is the university's education library and is jointly run by the University of Otago's College of Education and Otago Polytechnic, which is also located near the university's Dunedin campus.

==== Other libraries ====
The Wellington Medical and Health Sciences Library and the Canterbury Medical Library provide services to University of Otago students and staff, and the staff of the local District Health Boards. The university's Southland Campus also has a library.

== Organisation and administration ==
=== Organisation ===
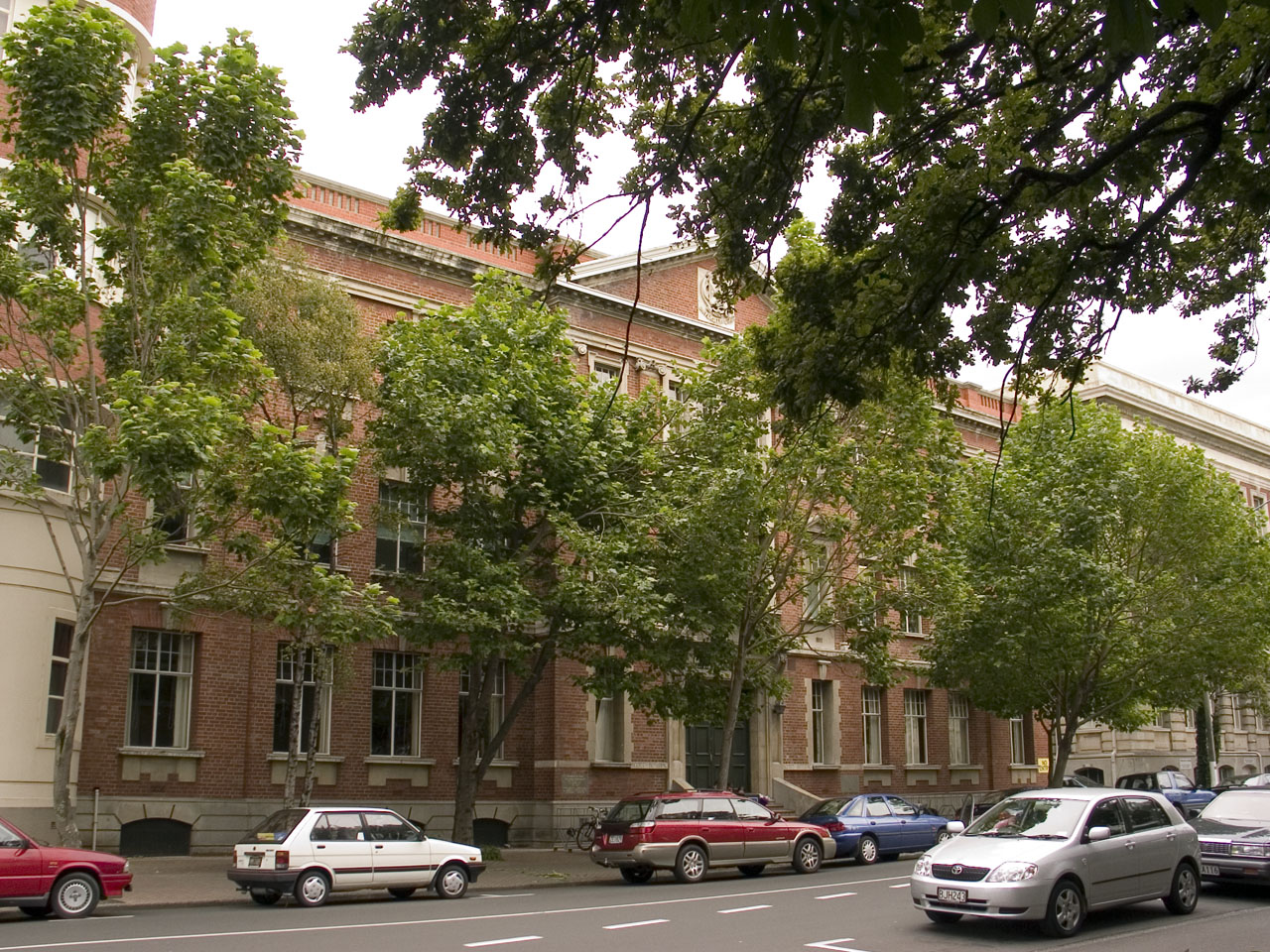
The Lindo Ferguson Building, home to the Departments of Anatomy and Physiology

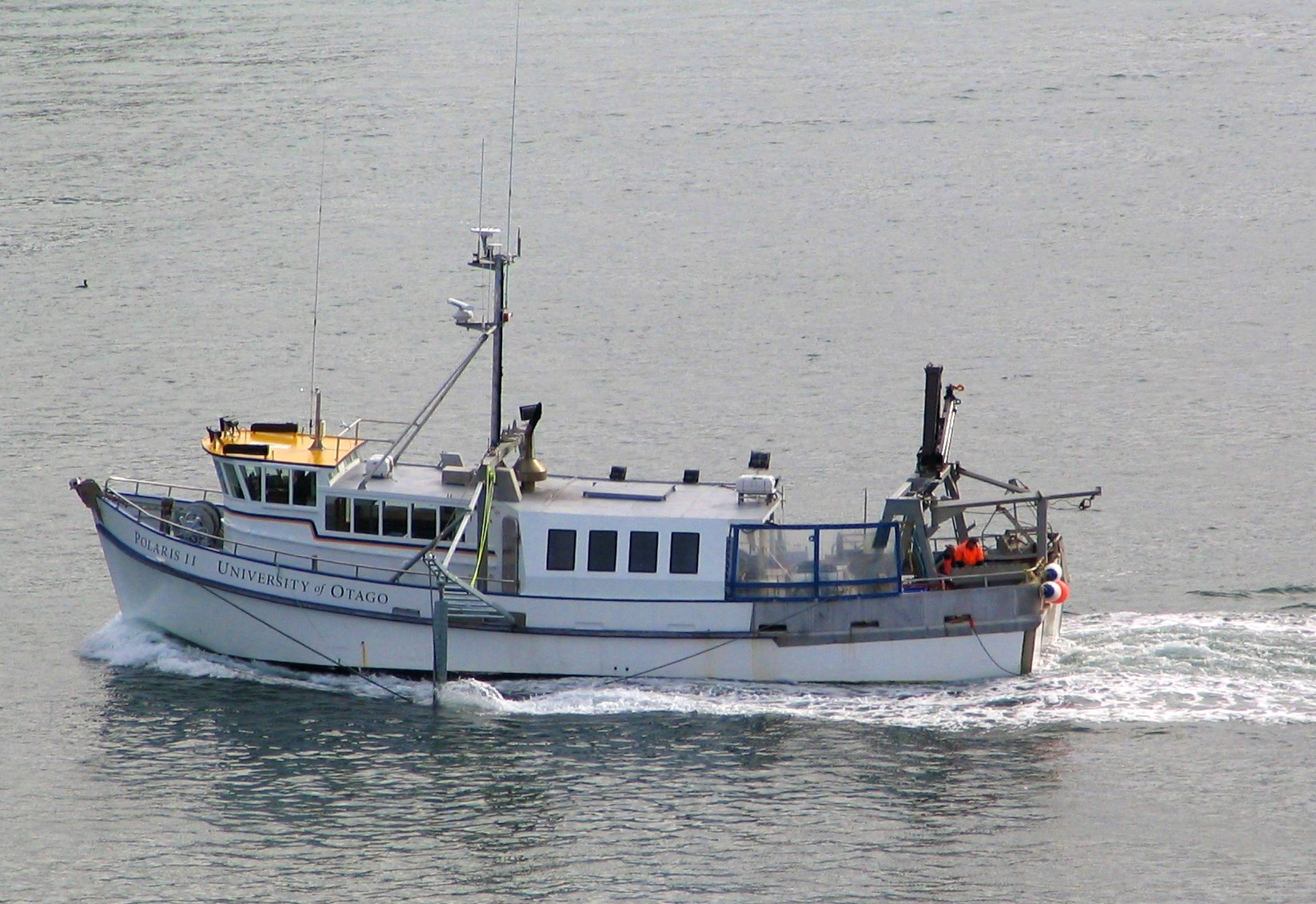
The university's research vessel Polaris II entering Otago Harbour

The university is divided into four academic divisions:

- Division of Humanities
- Division of Health Sciences
- Division of Sciences
- Otago Business School (Division of Commerce)

For external and marketing purposes, the Division of Commerce is known as the Otago Business School, as that is the term commonly used for its equivalent in North America. Historically, there were a number of schools and faculties, which have now been grouped with stand alone departments to form these divisions.

In addition to the usual university disciplines, the University of Otago Medical School (founded 1875) is one of only two medical schools in New Zealand (with component schools in Dunedin, Christchurch and Wellington); and Otago is the only university in the country to offer training in Dentistry. Other professional schools and faculties not found in all New Zealand universities include Pharmacy, Physical Education, Physiotherapy, Medical Laboratory Science, and Surveying. It was also home to the School of Mines, until this was transferred to the University of Auckland in 1987. Theology is also offered, traditionally in conjunction with the School of Ministry, Knox College, and Holy Cross College, Mosgiel.

There are also a number of service divisions including:

- External Engagement Division
- Financial Services Division
- Human Resources Division
- Information Technology Services Division
- Property Services Division
- Research Division
- Student and Academic Services Division
- Operations Division
- Campus Development Division
- Campus and Collegiate Life Services Division
- Academic Division
- Health, Safety and Wellbeing

=== Merger with Dunedin College of Education ===
The University of Otago and the Dunedin College of Education (a specialist teacher training institution) merged on 1 January 2007. The University of Otago College of Education is now based on the college site, and includes the college's campuses in Invercargill and Alexandra. Staff of the university's Faculty of Education relocated to the college site. A merger had been considered before, however the present talks progressed further, and more amicably, than previously.

=== Residential colleges ===
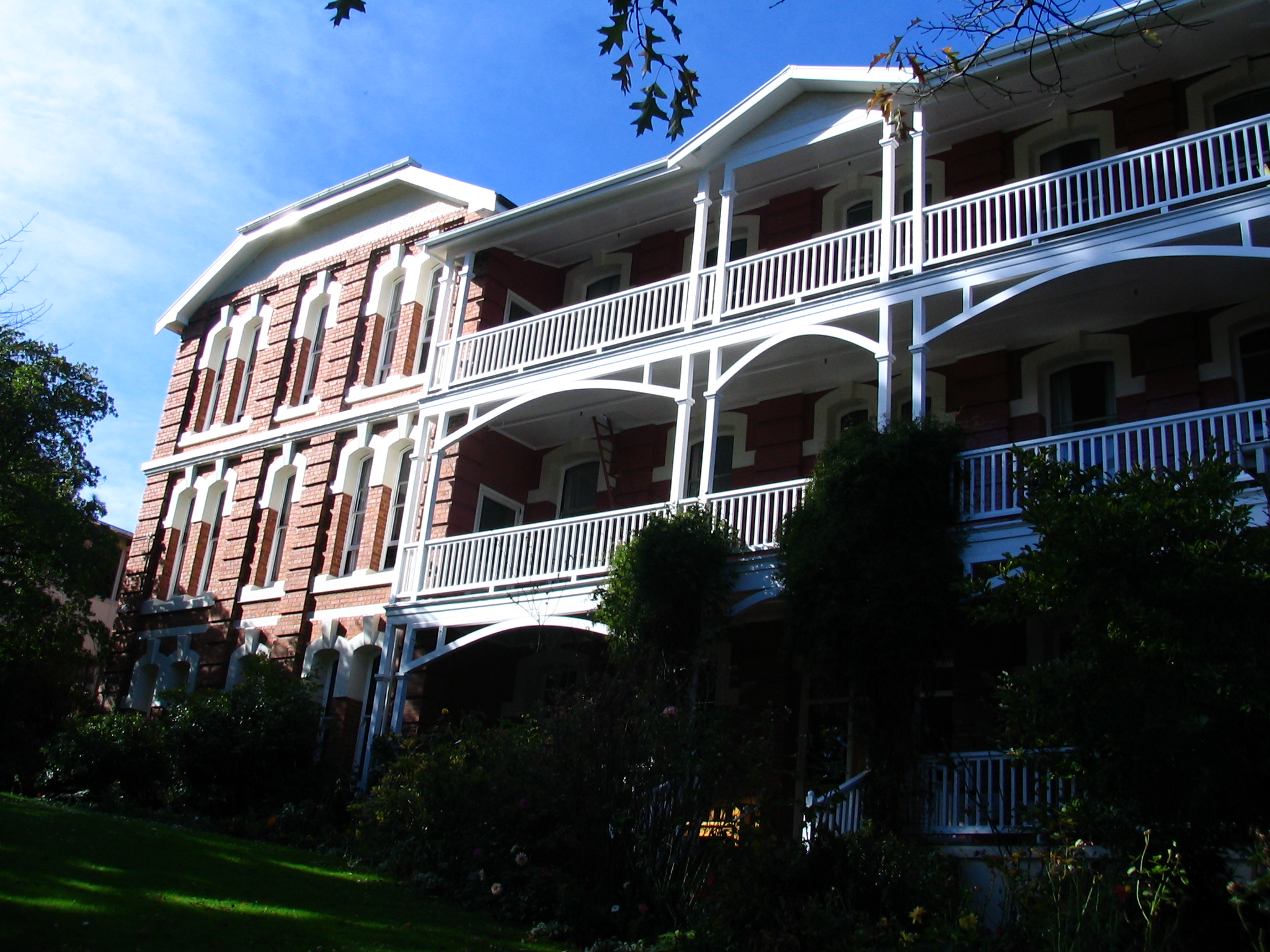
St Margaret's College

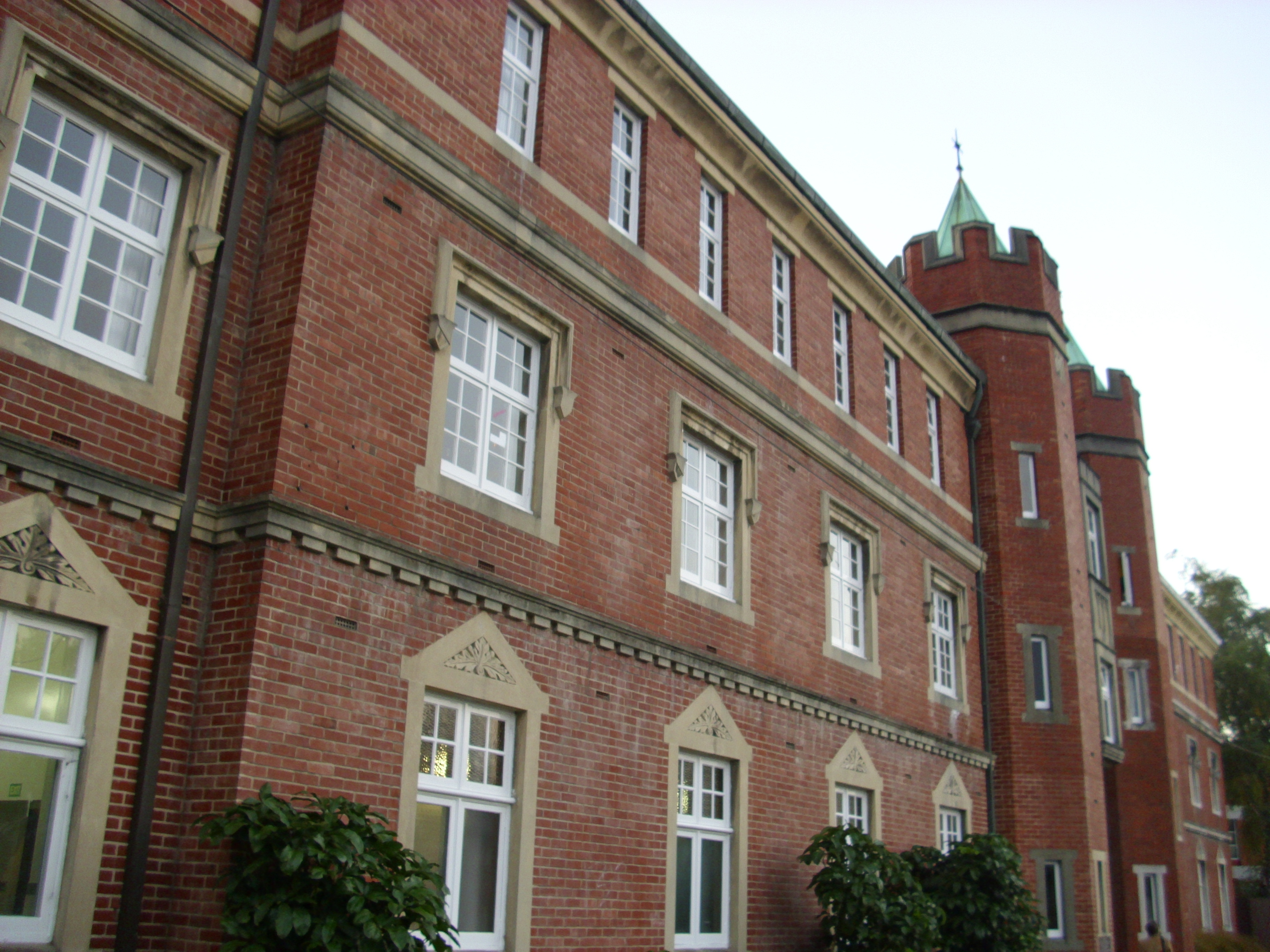
Selwyn College

The University of Otago owns, or is in affiliation with, fourteen residential colleges, which provide food, accommodation, social and welfare services. Most of these cater primarily for first year students, though some have a sizeable number of second and higher year undergraduates, as well as occasionally a significant postgraduate population. While some teaching is normally undertaken at a college, this generally represents a small percentage of a resident's formal tuition.

Most colleges actively seek to foster a sense of community and academic achievement amongst their members through, variously, intercollegiate competitions, communal dining, apartment groups, traditionalism, independent students' clubs, college events and internal sporting and cultural societies.

The colleges are geographically spread over the Dunedin urban area:

- Aquinas College
- Arana College
- Caroline Freeman College
- Carrington College
- 192 Castle College
- Cumberland College
- Hayward College
- Knox College
- Salmond College
- Selwyn College
- St Margaret's College
- Studholme College
- Te Rangihīroa College
- Toroa College
- University College

In mid October 2019, the University of Otago announced that it would be building a new 450-room residential college called Te Rangi Hiroa, which will replace the current Te Rangi Hiroa College along Cumberland Street. The new college is estimated to cost NZ$90 million and is located on the corner of Albany and Forth Streets near the Dunedin campus.

=== Coat of arms ===
Coat of arms of the University of Otago
Notes The Arms of the University of Otago were granted by the Lord Lyon on 21 January 1948 and based on the unauthorised arms used on the university's seal since 1870 Escutcheon Azure, on a saltire cantoned between four mullets of six points Or, a book, gilt-edged and bound in a cover Gules charged with a mullet of six points of the second and a book-marker of the third issuance from the page-foot Motto Sapere Aude ('dare to be wise' or 'have courage to be wise')

In mid-March 2023, the university unveiled a new proposed logo replacing the traditional coat of arms with a symbol and a new Māori name for the institution as part of its Vision 2040 strategy. The process was spearheaded by Tony Ballantyne and the university's Division of External Engagement. The proposed symbol is intended to symbolise the Otakou channel in Otago harbour while the coat of arms will be retained for ceremonial settings such as graduation events. The proposal also involves changing the current Māori name from Te Whare Wānanga o Otāgo to Ōtākou Whakaihu Waka ("A Place of Many Firsts"). Acting vice-chancellor Helen Nicholson stated that the proposed logo and name change was intended to create a visual identity that reflected modern Aotearoa New Zealand. The university also launched a consultation process for staff, students and alumni that will conclude on 16 April 2023. On 17 March 2023, an Otago Daily Times survey found that 77% (1,908) of 2,479 respondents opposed the proposed logo change. The process was also criticised for costing about $700,000 whilst large numbers of academic staff were made redundant on the grounds of budgetary shortfalls.

On 11 July 2023, the University council voted to proceed with the logo and alternate Māori name change following a consultation process with staff, students, and alumni. Three quarters of respondents voted to replace the coat of arms with the O-shaped symbol while two thirds voted to change the Māori name from Te Whare Wānanga o Otāgo to Ōtākou Whakaihu Waka ("A Place of Many Firsts"). The new logo was rolled out from March 2024 over a 12-month period at a cost of NZ$1.3 million.

== Academic profile ==
=== Distinctions ===
Many Fellowships add to the diversity of the people associated with "Otago". They include:

- Robert Burns Fellowship (literature)
- Caroline Plummer Fellowship in Community Dance
- Charles Hercus Fellowship
- Claude McCarthy Fellowship
- Foxley Fellowship
- Frances Hodgkins Fellowship (art)
- Henry Lang Fellowship
- Hocken Fellowship
- Mozart Fellowship (music)
- THB Symons Fellowship
- William Evans Visiting Fellowship

In 1998, the Department of Physics gained some fame for making the first Bose–Einstein condensate in the Southern Hemisphere.

The 2006 Government investigation into research quality (to serve as a basis for future funding) ranked Otago the top University in New Zealand overall, taking into account the quality of its staff and research produced. It was also ranked first in the categories of Clinical Medicine, Biomedical Science, Law, English Literature and Language, History and Earth Science. The Department of Philosophy received the highest score for any nominated academic unit. Otago had been ranked fourth in the 2004 assessment.

In 2006, a report released by the Ministry of Research, Science and Technology found that Otago was the most research intensive university in New Zealand, with 40% of staff time devoted to research and development.

Journal "Science" has recommended worldwide study of Otago's Biochemistry database "Transterm", which has genomic data on 40,000 species.

=== Academic reputation ===
University rankings

Global – Overall
- ARWU World: 401-500 (2025)
- CWTS World: 390 (Note: The CWTS Leiden Ranking is based on P (top 10%).) (2024)
- QS World: =197 (2026)
- THE World: 351–400 (2026)
- USNWR Global: =296 (25/26)

National – Overall
- ARWU National: 2-4 (2025)
- CWTS National: 2 (2024)
- QS National: 2 (2026)
- THE National: 2 (2026)
- USNWR National: 2 (25/26)

In the 2024 Aggregate Ranking of Top Universities, which measures aggregate performance across the QS, THE and ARWU rankings, the university attained a position of #279 (2nd nationally).

In the 2026 Quacquarelli Symonds World University Rankings (published 2025), the university attained a tied position of #197 (2nd nationally).

In the Times Higher Education World University Rankings 2026 (published 2025), the university attained a position of #351-400 (2nd nationally).

In the 2025 Academic Ranking of World Universities, the university attained a position of #401-500 (tied 2-4th nationally).

In the 2025–2026 U.S. News & World Report Best Global Universities, the university attained a tied position of #296 (2nd nationally).

In the CWTS Leiden Ranking 2024, the university attained a position of #390 (2nd nationally).

== Student life ==
=== O-Week ===
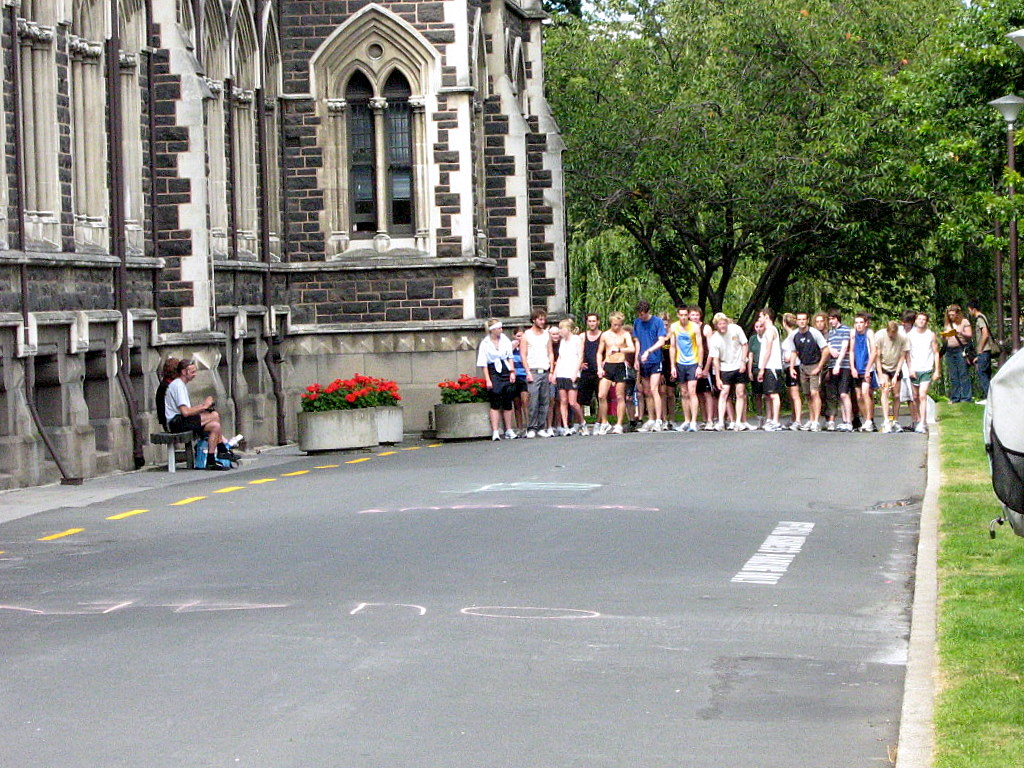
Participants in the annual clocktower race lining up, ready to go.

Orientation week, or 'O-Week' is the Otago equivalent of freshers' week. New students are most commonly known by their seniors as 'freshers' or simply as 'first-years'. O-week is organised by the Otago University Students' Association and involves competitions such as 'Fresher of the Year' whereby several students volunteer to carry out a series of tasks throughout the week before being voted to win. Other competitions include that of different faculties facing off with each other. The OUSA also organises events each night including various concerts, a comedy night, hypnotist plus bigger events at Forsyth Barr Stadium. Typically there is a Highlanders rugby game scheduled during the week. Local bars organise events also with a range of live music and promotional deals. Historically events have included the Cookathon and a Miss O-Week competition hosted by The Outback. The Cookathon was held by a local pub (the Cook) with the premise that your first drink costs you about $20 which gives you a t-shirt, three meal vouchers and reduced price on drinks then you spend the rest of the day binge drinking and 'telephoning' the occasional jug with mates.

Traditions

Each year the first years are encouraged to attend the toga parade and party dressed in white sheets wrapped as togas. Retailers called for an end of the parade after property damage and disorder during the 2009 event. However, the OUSA took it upon themselves to reintroduce this tradition, with a festival like event taking place at the stadium. 2012 Toga Party saw an unofficial world record. A clocktower race also occurs, in the style of Chariots of Fire. Students must race round the tower and attached building, beginning on the first chime of the clock at noon and completing before the chimes cease. Unlike Chariots of Fire, the task is possible with a couple of students completing each year.

=== Behavioural issues ===
Student behaviour is a major concern for both the university administration and Dunedin residents in general. Concerns over student behaviour prompted the university to introduce a Code of Conduct (CoC) which its students must abide by in 2007. The introduction of the CoC was accompanied by the establishment of the dedicated 'Campus Watch' security force to keep tabs on crime and anti-social behaviour on campus and in the student neighbourhoods nearby. Campus Watch reports directly to the university's proctor.

Riots

Riots took place in 2006, 2007, 2008 and 2009 related to events surrounding the Undie 500 car rally organised by students from Canterbury University. Other student social events during the year such as the Toga Parade and the Hyde Street Keg Race are also notable for attracting police attention, but not to the scale of the Undie riots. In 2012 there were 80 people treated by emergency services and 15 arrests by police after the Hyde Street party went out of control.

Protest

Otago students are notable for protesting over contentious political issues in nearly every decade. In the 1960s students at Otago who were involved with the Progressive Youth Movement led protests against the Vietnam War. In the 1960s mixed flatting (males and females were prohibited from sharing housing up to that time) was contested in various creative ways by Otago students. On 28 September 1993 Otago students protested against a fee increase at the University Registry (Clocktower Building), which ended in a violent clash with police. In the lead up to the 1996 general election students trying to stop a 25% fee increase occupied the University Registry (Clocktower Building) for over a week (which was followed by similar occupations at campuses around the country), fee increases were limited to 17%. Since 2004, the Otago University NORML club, led by Abe Gray, met weekly on the Otago campus to protest by smoking cannabis in defiance of New Zealand's cannabis laws. In 2008, several members were arrested and issued with trespass notices banning them from the Union Lawn.

== Student body ==
=== Admissions Statistics ===
Enrolment By Qualification Type	2019	2018	2017	2016	2015	2014	2013	2012	2011	2010	2009	2008	2007	2006	2005	2004	2003
Doctoral	1,579	1,541	1,501	1,411	1,387	1,389	1,361	1,377	1,259	1,258	1,206	1,104	1,048	935	829	755	723
Masters'	1,469	1,360	1,261	1,287	1,224	1,214	1,216	1,281	969	979	921	874	838	1,052	1,108	1,060	994
Postgraduate Diplomas and Certificates	1,591	1,691	1,762	1,654	1,542	1,388	1,383	1,477	1,541	1,660	1,620	1,566	1,435	1,507	1,378	1,353	1,345
Graduate Diplomas	192	215	243	294	314	388	416	426	475	487	405	317	494	204	392	314	298
Bachelor's with Honours	396	404	366	385	451	434	460	524	873	854	843	723	750	736	769	771	763
Bachelor's Ordinary	14,728	14,677	14,448	14,598	14,559	15,136	15,489	15,762	15,593	15,780	15,359	13,347	13,136	12,868	12,939	12,711	12,186
Undergraduate Diplomas and Certificates	14	17	20	29	39	65	73	92	116	152	169	133	265	216	239	318	344
Certificate of Proficiency	1,576	1,455	1,492	1,493	1,442	1,284	1,228	1,171	1,326	1,450	1,419	?	?	?	?	?	?
Interest Only	13	5	11	1	4	10	0	0	?	223	150	?	?	?	?	?	?
Foundation Studies	263	298	305	292	316	300	303	266	254	273	282	?	?	?	?	?	?
Total	21,240	21,108	20,838	20,814	20,601	20,942	21,113	21,416	21,728	22,139	21,507	20,752	20,665	19,853	20,057	19,674	18,844

Gender of Students	2019	2018	2017	2016	2015
Female	12,711	12,588	12,272	12,147	11,879
Male	8,510	8,519	8,565	8,665	8,720
Gender diverse	19	1	1	2	2
Total	21,240	21,108	20,838	20,814	20,601

Ethnicity of Students	2019	2018	2017	2016	2015	2014	2013	2012	2011	2010	2009	2008	2007	2006	2005	2004
European/Pākehā	71.5%	71.4%	72.4%	73.1%	73.4%	74.3%	74.3%	74.8%	75.0%	75.6%	75.7%	76.8%	68.4%	68.3%	69.1%	69.5%
Māori	10.3%	9.9%	9.3%	8.9%	8.5%	8.5%	8.0%	7.8%	7.6%	7.6%	7.5%	7.3%	6.9%	6.4%	6.2%	6.1%
Asian	20.3%	20.5%	19.8%	19.2%	18.8%	18.3%	18.6%	18.3%	17.9%	17.2%	16.9%	16.0%	15.6%	16.5%	16.1%	15.2%
Pacific Islanders	5.0%	4.7%	4.5%	4.2%	3.9%	3.6%	3.2%	3.1%	3.1%	3.1%	3.0%	2.8%	2.6%	2.6%	2.5%	2.5%
Middle Eastern / Latin American / African	3.7%	3.6%	3.4%	3.4%	3.6%	?	?	?	?	?	?	?	?	?	?	?
Other / unknown	3.8%	3.7%	3.9%	3.7%	3.6%	3.2%	3.3%	2.9%	2.9%	2.5%	5.3%	4.4%	6.5%	6.2%	6.1%	6.6%

== Notable people ==
=== Chancellors ===
The following is a list of chancellors of the University of Otago.

	Name	Portrait	Term
1	Thomas Burns		1869–1871
2	John Richardson		1871–1876
3	Henry Samuel Chapman		1876–1879
4	Donald Stuart		1879–1894
5	Joshua Williams		1894–1909
6	James Allen		1909–1912
7	Andrew Cameron		1912–1925
8	Thomas Sidey		1925–1933
9	William John Morrell		1933–1945
10	David Herron		1946–1955
11	Hubert Ryburn		1955–1970
12	Stuart Sidey		1970–1976
13	Jack Somerville		1976–1982
14	Jim Valentine		1982–1992
15	Judith Medlicott		1993–1998
16	Eion Edgar		1999–2003
17	Lindsay Brown		2004–2008
18	John Ward		2009–2017
19	Royden Somerville		2018–2022
20	Stephen Higgs		2022–2024
21	Trish Oakley		2024–present

The following is a list of vice-chancellors of the university.

	Name	Portrait	Term
1	Robert Aitken		1948–1953
2	Frederick Soper		1953–1963
3	Arthur Beacham		1964–1966
4	Robin Williams		1967–1973
5	Robin Irvine		1973–1993
6	Graeme Fogelberg		1994–2004
7	David Skegg		2004–2011
8	Harlene Hayne		2011–2021
9	David Murdoch		2022–2023
−	Helen Nicholson (acting)		2023–2024
10	Grant Robertson		2024–present

=== Faculty ===
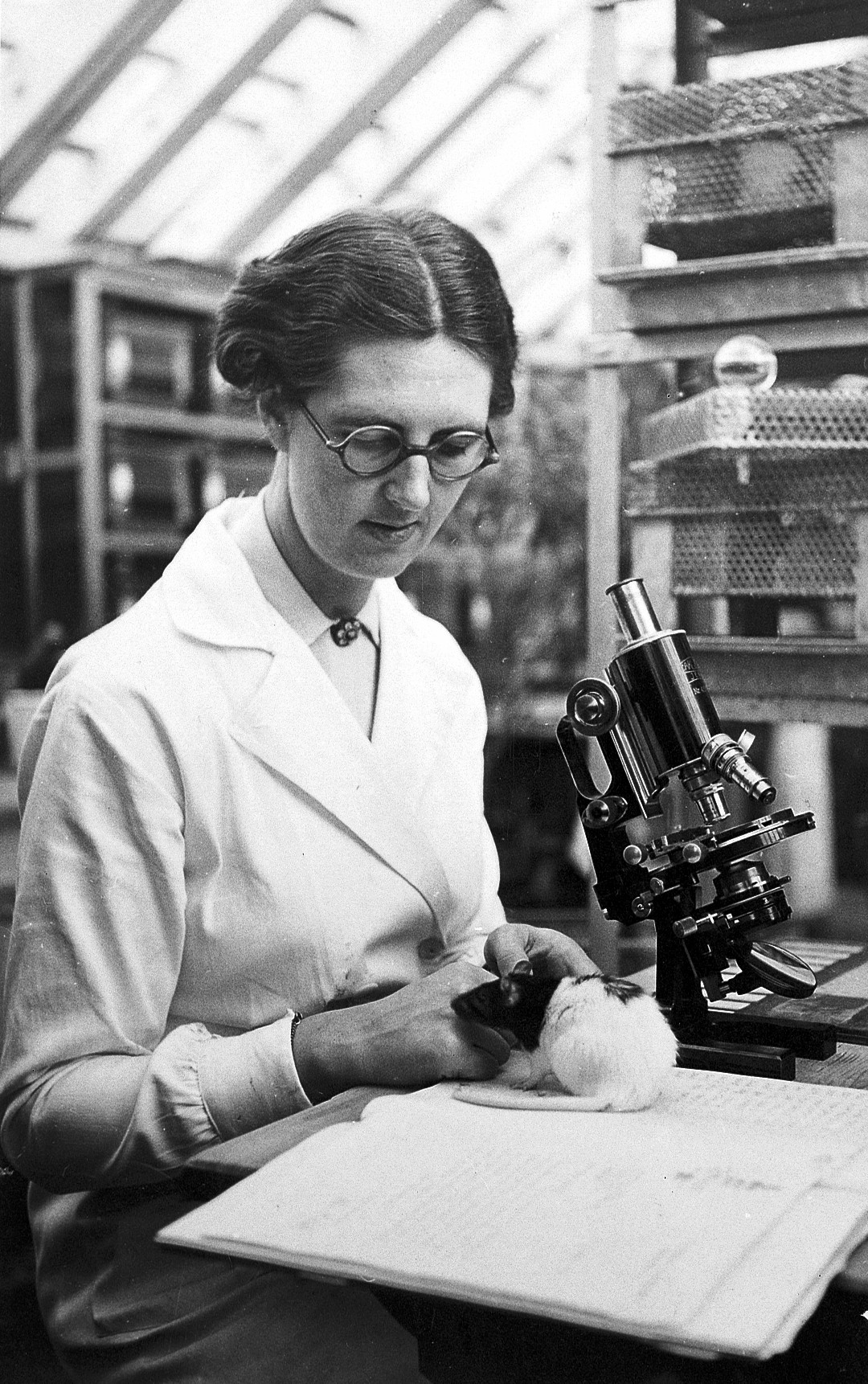
Alice Copping

- John Kinloch Anderson, classicist
- Muriel Bell, nutritionist and medical researcher
- Agnes Blackie, first female physics academic
- Robert J. T. Bell, mathematician
- Noel Benson, geologist
- Marianne Bielschowsky, biochemist
- Carolyn Burns, Marsden Medal winning zoologist
- Jennie Connor Medicine
- Alice Copping, nutritionist
- Alison Cree, herpetologist
- Marie Crowe, psychotherapy academic
- John Crump, infectious diseases specialist
- Michael Cullen, politician
- Catherine Day, biochemist
- Sarah Derrett, injury prevention specialist
- John Carew Eccles, medical researcher
- Norman Lowther Edson, biochemistry
- Solomon Faine, microbiologist
- J.N. Findlay, philosopher
- Jim Flynn, intelligence researcher and political philosopher
- Abe Gray, founder of the Whakamana Cannabis Museum, high-profile cannabis activist and protester for almost two decades
- David Harris, software developer
- Jocelyn Harris, professor of English
- Janet Hoek, public health
- Christina Hulbe, Antarctic researcher, glaciologist
- Keith Hunter, Marsden Medal winning marine chemist
- Robert Jack, physicist
- Leopold Kirschner, bacteriologist
- Pat Langhorne, physicist
- Raechel Laing, clothing and textiles researcher
- J. L. Mackie, philosopher
- Brian John Marples (1907–1967), professor of Zoology 1937–1967
- Alan Musgrave, philosopher of science
- Lisa Matisoo-Smith, professor of Biological Anthropology and Head of the Department of Anatomy
- Pauline Norris, pharmacy professor
- Patricia Priest, epidemiologist and professor of public health
- Elaine Reese, psychology professor
- Christina Riesselman, paleoceanographer
- Bridget Robinson, Mackenzie Chair in Cancer Medicine
- Angus Ross, professor of history
- Abigail Smith, professor in marine sciences
- David Skegg, epidemiologist
- Rachael Taylor
- Virginia Toy, geology
- Gillian Whalley, medical research

=== Alumni ===
(with residential college, if any, in parentheses where known)

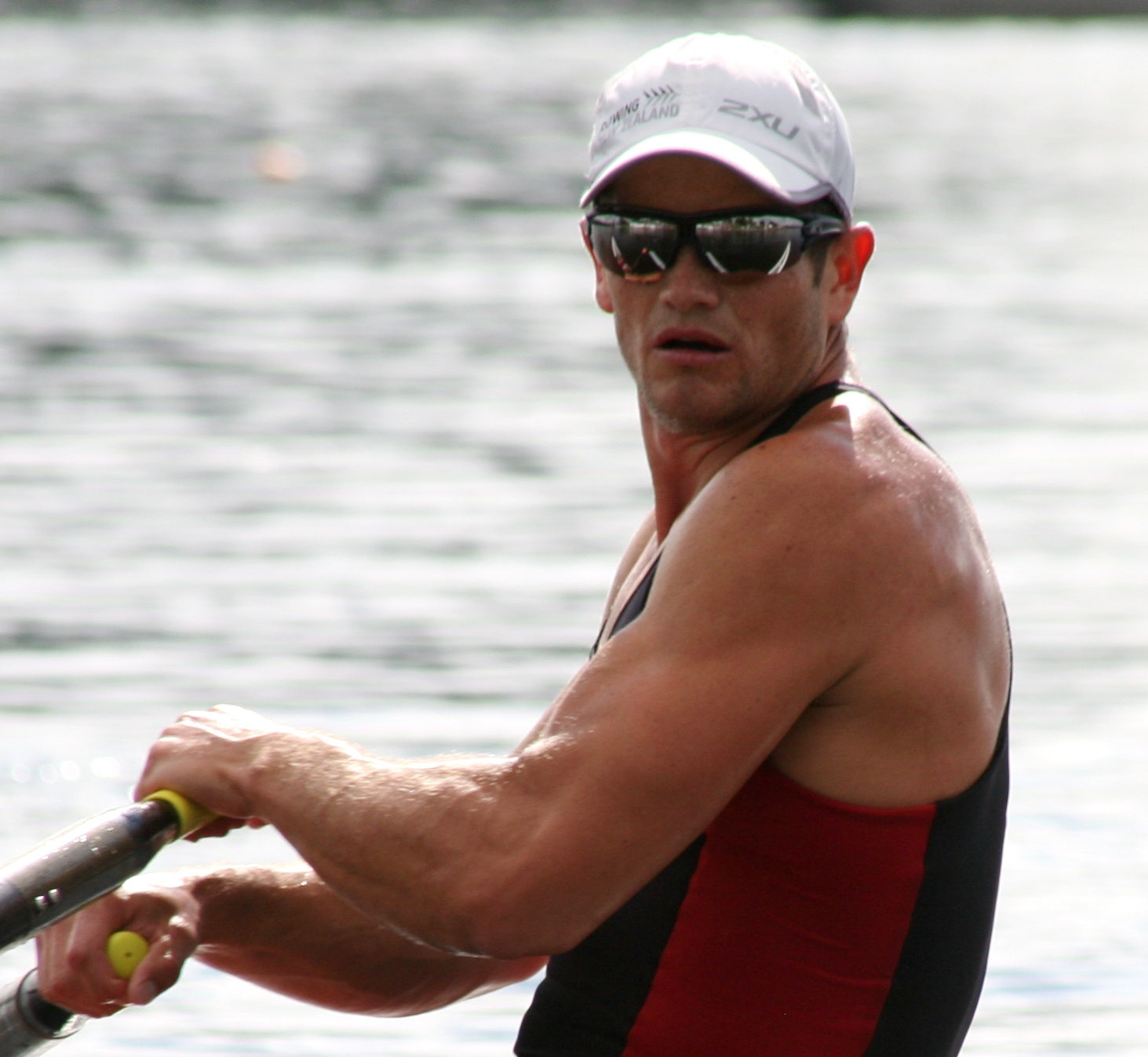
Nathan Cohen

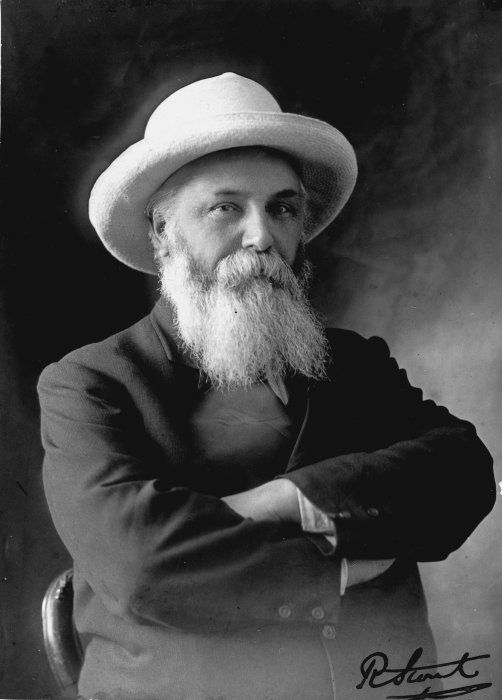
Robert Stout, 13th Premier

- Arthur Henry Adams, journalist and writer
- Barbara Anderson, novelist
- Rui Maria de Araújo, prime minister of Timor-Leste
- Annette Baier, moral philosopher
- Rayyanah Barnawi, Saudi astronaut
- Muriel Bell, nutritionist and medical researcher
- David Benson-Pope, politician
- W. D. Borrie, demographer
- Christine Jensen Burke, mountain climber
- Dame Silvia Cartwright, Governor General
- Brian Christie, neuroscientist
- Nathan Cohen, world champion and Olympic champion rower
- John Coverdale, academic psychiatrist
- John Crump, infectious diseases specialist
- David Cunliffe (Carrington), politician
- Helen Danesh-Meyer, ophthalmology academic
- Thomas Davis, politician, diplomat and researcher
- Glen Denham, Tall Black
- Derek Denny-Brown
- Sarah Derrett, injury prevention specialist
- Archibald Durward FRSE, anatomist
- Marc Ellis (University College), All Black

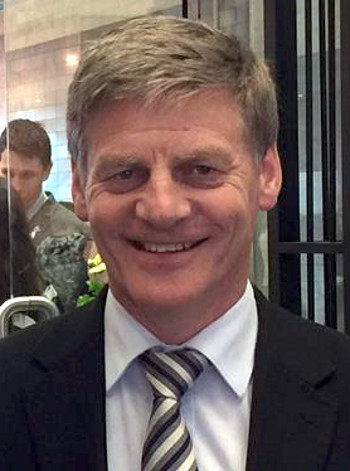
Bill English, 39th prime minister

- Bill English (Selwyn), 39th prime minister of New Zealand
- Solomon Faine, microbiologist
- Janet Frame, writer
- Ian Fraser, broadcaster
- Caroline Freeman, first female graduate of the University of Otago
- William Fyfe, geochemist
- Jon Gadsby, comedian and actor
- John Gallas, poet and educator
- Abe Gray, founder of the Whakamana Cannabis Museum, high-profile cannabis activist and protester for almost two decades
- Sir Harold Delf Gillies, plastic surgeon
- Sir Malcolm Grant (Selwyn), lawyer and Vice-Chancellor of University College London (2003–13); subsequently Chairman of NHS England and Chancellor of the University of York
- Stephen Guest, legal academic
- Geoffrey Harding OAM, medical practitioner
- Graeme Hart, businessman
- Volker Heine, physicist
- Jan Hellriegel, singer/songwriter
- Greg Henderson, cyclist
- Sir Peter Buck, doctor, military leader, health administrator, politician, anthropologist and museum director.
- Brent Hodge (Cumberland), director

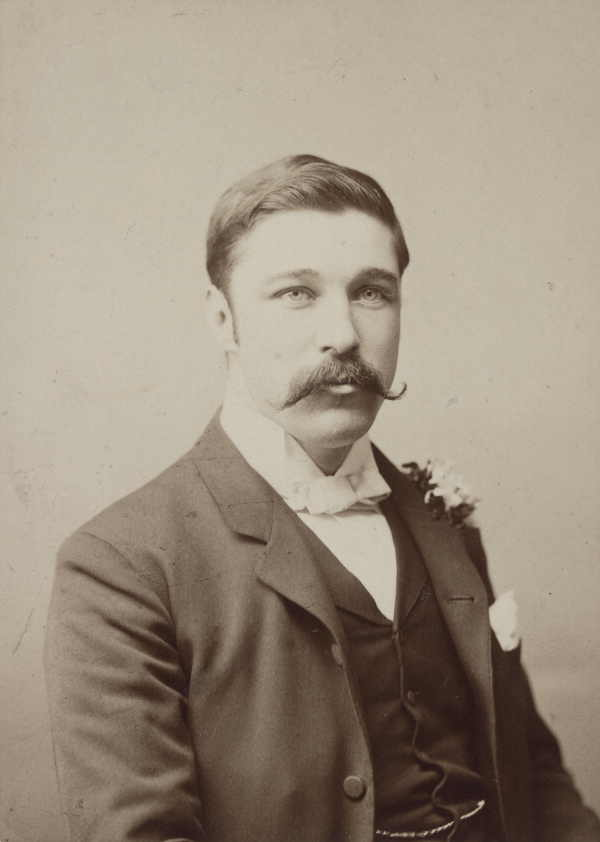
Fergus Hume, novelist

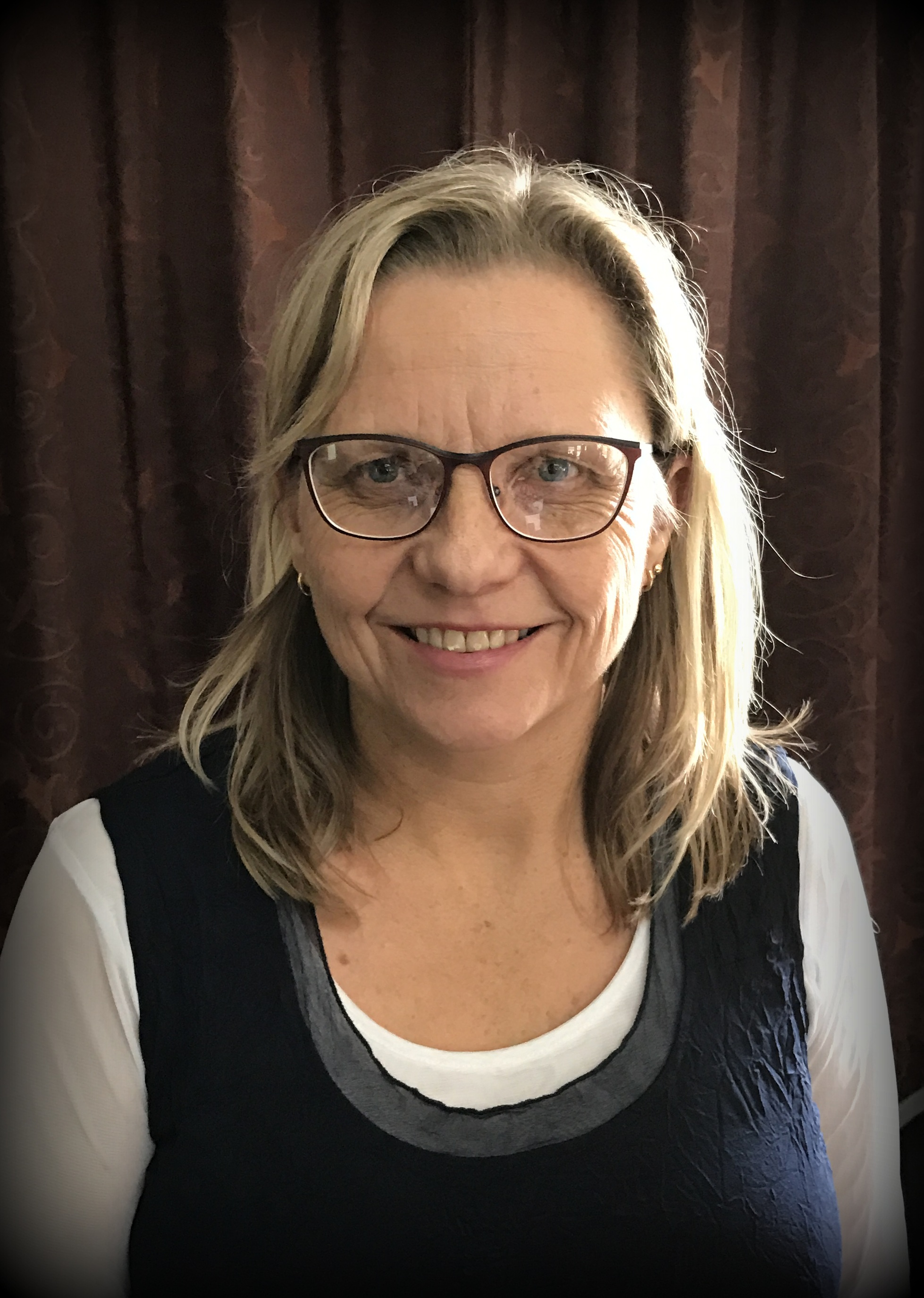
Tania Lineham

- Fergus Hume, novelist
- Ludwig Keke, Nauruan politician
- David Kirk (Selwyn), All Black captain and businessman
- Josh Kronfeld (Aquinas College), All Black
- Chris Laidlaw, All Black and politician
- Samuelu Laloniu, Permanent Representative of Tuvalu to the United Nations
- Michael Laws, (Arana) politician, writer, broadcaster
- Tania Lineham, science teacher, winner of the Prime Minister's Science Teacher Prize, 2015
- Bridie Lonie, artist and art academic
- John Edward "Jack" Lovelock, athlete
- Chris Mahony, World Bank professional, University of Oxford doctorate, athlete
- Dee Mangin, David Braley Nancy Gordon Chair in Family Medicine at McMaster University
- Kamisese Mara (Knox), politician
- Diana Martin, microbiologist in New Zealand (1942–2019)
- Stella Maxwell, fashion model
- Dame Judith Mayhew Jonas, businesswoman
- Archibald McIndoe, plastic surgeon
- Joseph William Mellor, chemist
- James S. Milne, mathematician
- Arnold Nordmeyer, politician
- Christopher Norton, composer
- Anton Oliver (University College), captain of the All Blacks
- Mazlan Othman, astrophysicist, director of the United Nations Office for Outer Space Affairs

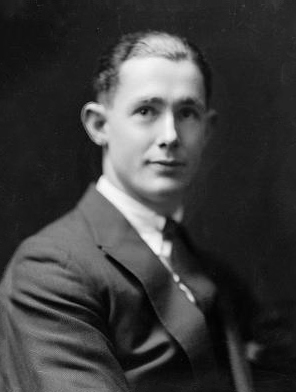
Lord Porritt, athlete, physician and 11th governor-general

- Lan Pham, politician and ecologist
- Lord Porritt (Selwyn), Olympian, physician to the queen and governor general
- Arthur Prior, philosopher
- Lauren Kim Roche, physician and author
- Emily Siedeberg, first female medical graduate
- Penny Simmonds, politician
- John Staveley, haematologist and pathologist
- Robert Stout (Aquinas), prime minister of New Zealand
- Sulaiman Daud, politician
- Sione Tapa, Tongan minister of gealth
- Peter Tapsell, politician
- Pobert H Wade LSE professor
- Jeremy Waldron, legal philosopher
- Murray Webb, cricketer and caricaturist
- Bridget Williams, publisher
- Allan Wilson, molecular biologist

=== Rhodes Scholars ===
list of Rhodes Scholars:

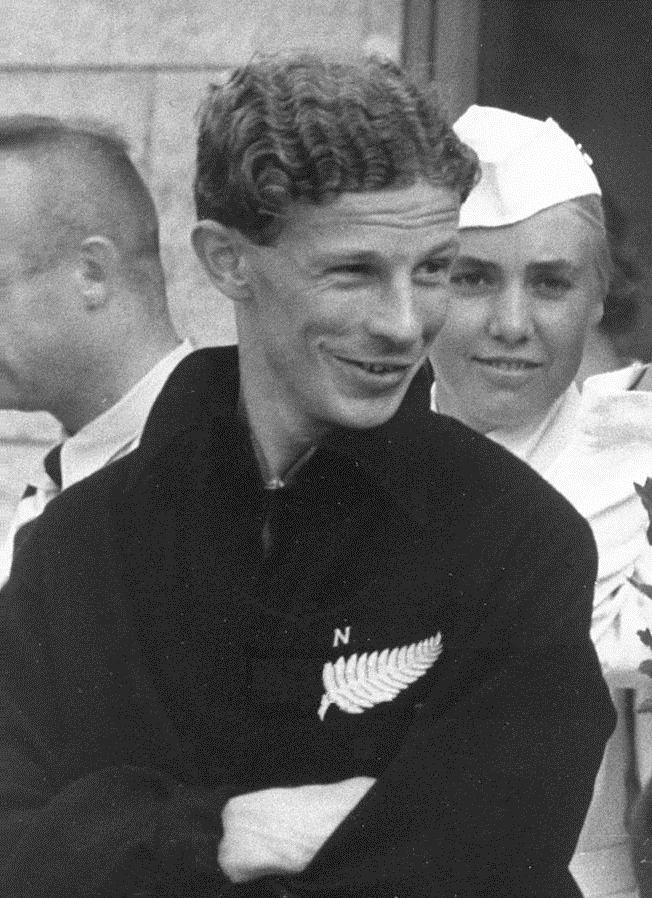
Jack Lovelock, athlete

(College at Oxford in brackets)(Source: List of NZ Rhodes Scholars)

- 1907 d Colin Macdonald Gilray (University)
- 1923 d Rt Hon. Lord Arthur Espie Porritt (Magdalen)
- 1931 d Dr John Edward (Jack) Lovelock (Exeter)
- 1932 d Sir Geoffrey Sandford Cox (Oriel)
- 1934 d Norman Davis (Merton)
- 1936 d Daniel Marcus Davin (Note: Two of Dan Davin's novels are set at the University.) (Balliol)
- 1952 Hon. Hugh Templeton (Balliol)
- 1960 Dr James Julian Bennett Jack (Magdalen)
- 1968 Christopher Robert Laidlaw (Merton)
- 1985 Dr David Kirk (Worcester)
- 1988 Dr Ceri Lee Evans (Worcester)
- 2007 Holly Walker (University)

== See also ==
- University of Otago School of Performing Arts and Allen Hall Theatre
- List of Honorary Doctors of the University of Otago
- Scarfies
