= William Morrell (historian) =

New Zealand historian and professor

William Parker Morrell, CBE (20 November 1899 – 27 April 1986) was a notable New Zealand historian and university professor. He was born in Auckland, New Zealand on 20 November 1899.

His father was William John Morrell, Chancellor of Otago University, Dunedin.
