= Ted McCoy =

New Zealand architect

Ted McCoy ONZM
- Born: Edward John McCoy; 23 February 1925; Dunedin, New Zealand
- Died: 17 January 2018 (aged 92); Dunedin, New Zealand
- Education: Auckland University College
- Occupation: Architect
- Children: 13
- Awards: NZIA Gold Medal (2002)
- Practice: McCoy and Wixon

Edward John McCoy ONZM (23 February 1925 – 17 January 2018), generally known as Ted McCoy, was a New Zealand architect whose practice was based in Dunedin. He designed the sanctuary of St Paul's Cathedral (completed 1970), and the Richardson (formerly Hocken) Building of the University of Otago (completed 1979), among many others. In 1950, he established McCoy and Wixon Architects, joined in partnership by Peter Wixon in 1967.

== Biography ==
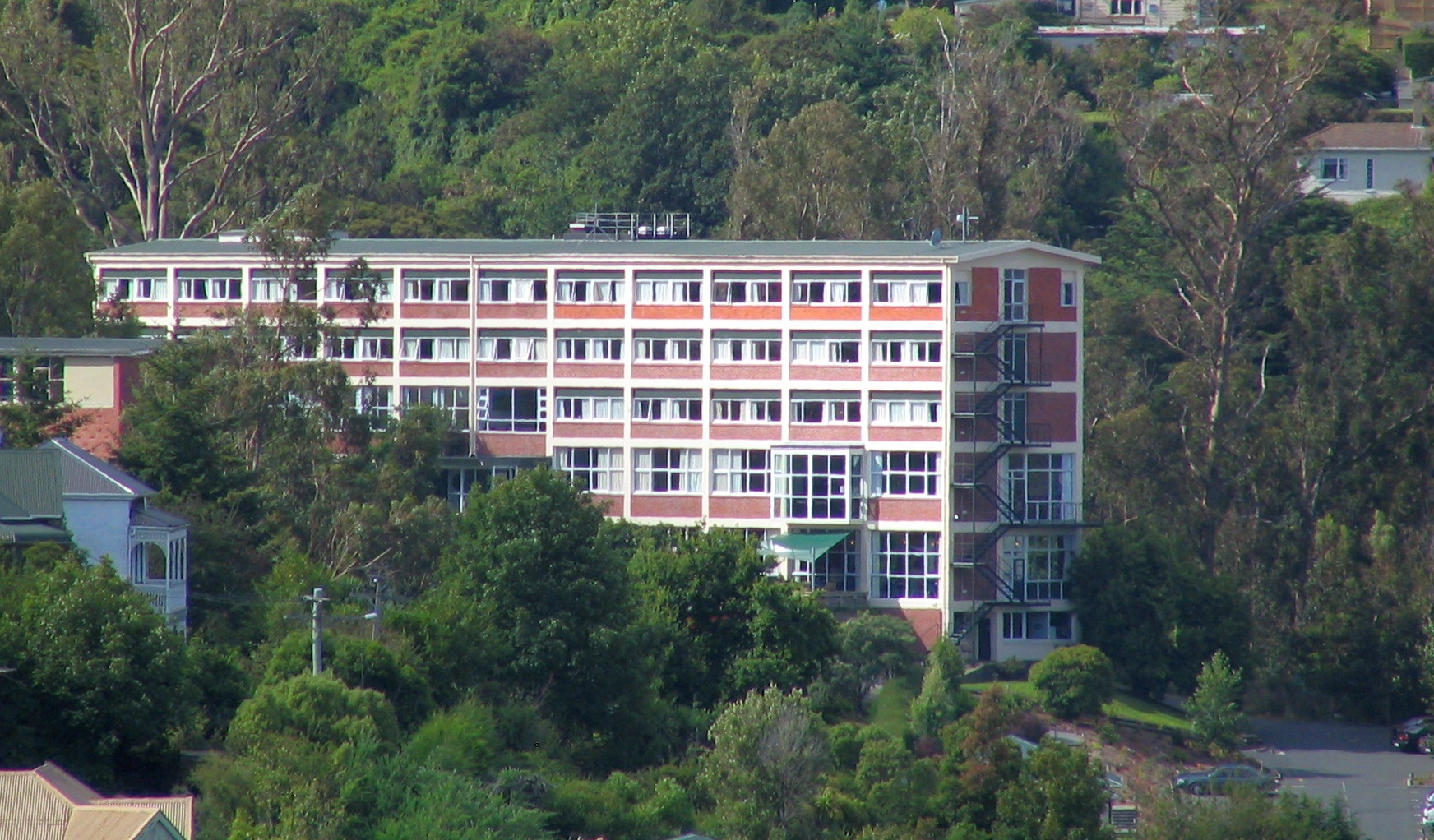
Aquinas College, Dunedin

McCoy was born on 23 February 1925 in Dunedin, the third of five children. McCoy studied architecture at the University of Auckland, graduating in 1949. He moved back to his home city of Dunedin the following year, setting up an architectural practice in the city. His first major design was for the Dominican Order's Aquinas Hall, in the north of the city, (now an Otago University hall of residence, Aquinas College). The design won a Gold Medal as design of the year from the New Zealand Institute of Architects.

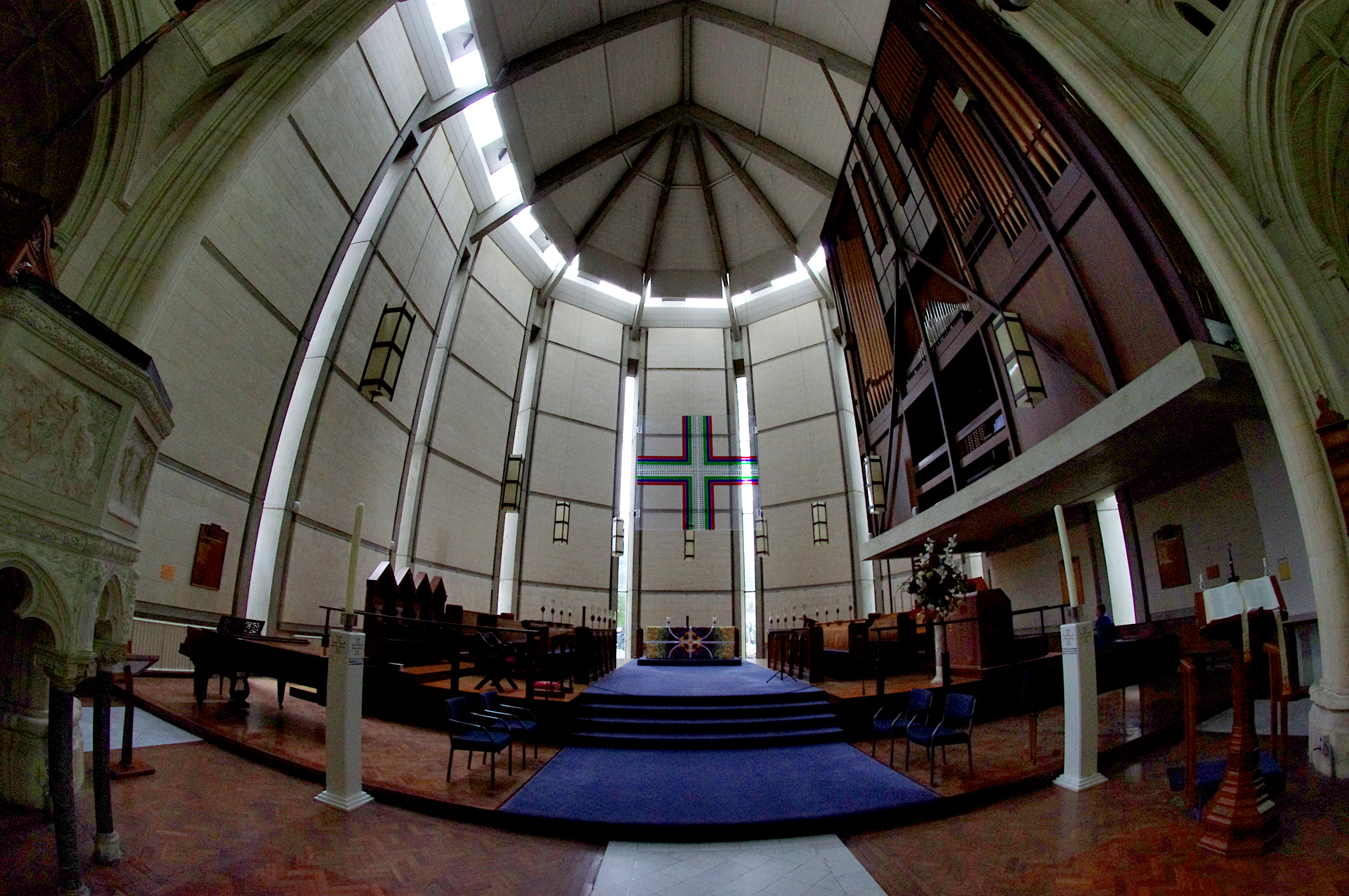
Fish-eye view of the Sanctuary of St Paul's Cathedral, Dunedin

McCoy's architectural influences included 1950s Californian architecture, Scandinavian modernism, and the work of Frank Lloyd Wright. He was also fascinated by the Victorian and Edwardian architecture of his home city. Much of McCoy's work was Brutalist, though his awareness of the historic styles within Dunedin led him to create buildings which echoed history as well as presenting the modern. This was perhaps most noteworthy in the sanctuary of Dunedin's St Paul's Cathedral, where a modern addition was created for a much older structure.

In 1967, McCoy set up a partnership with Peter Wixon to form McCoy and Wixon Architects. The firm won many institutional and governmental commissions, notably the Chancery for the New Zealand High Commission in Papua New Guinea.

McCoy and his wife Nola had 13 children, two sons and 11 daughters, four of whom followed him into architectural design, as has one of their 20 grandchildren. He died at his home in Dunedin on 17 January 2018, aged 92. Nola McCoy died in 2025.

== Works ==
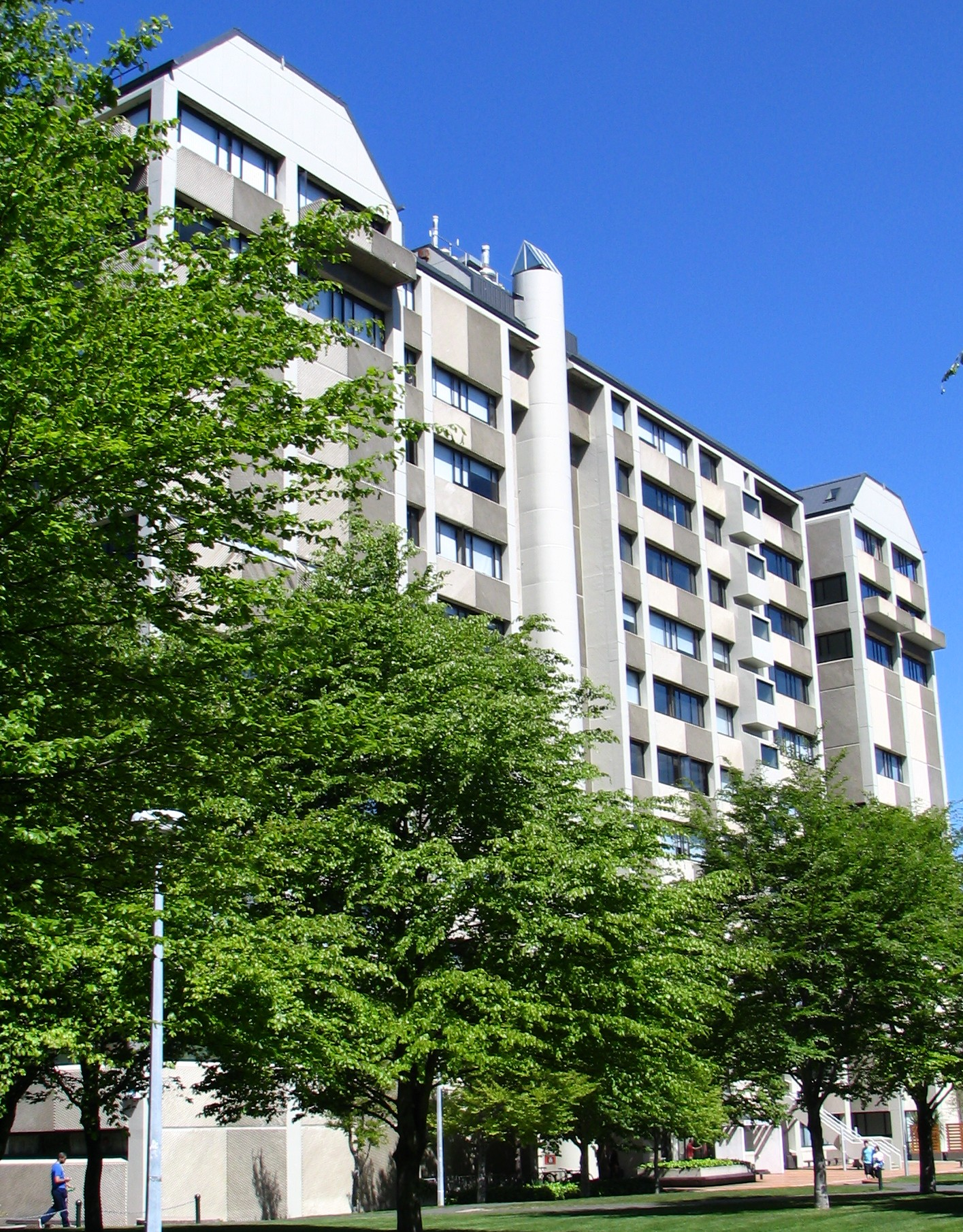
The Richardson Building in 2008

- Otago Boys' High School development
- 1950 Aquinas College
- 1970 St Paul's Cathedral sanctuary
- 1973 Archway Lecture Theatre Complex
- 1979 Richardson Building, formerly known as the Hocken Building
- 1986 Castle Lecture Theatre Complex
- 1969 University College
- 1983 Broadwater (private home), Doctors Point, Waitati
- 1991, 1999 East Taieri Presbyterian Church administrative and fellowship centre at the rear of the building.
- 2000 Otago Museum atrium

== Recognition ==
- 2002 New Zealand Institute of Architects' gold medal for lifetime achievement in architecture.
- 2005 Officer of the New Zealand Order of Merit, for services to architecture and architectural heritage
- 2008 Honorary doctor of laws degree from the University of Otago
- 2009 Dunedin Heritage Trust Bluestone Award

McCoy was past national president, and a Fellow, of the New Zealand Institute of Architects, Honorary Fellow of the Royal Canadian Institute of Architects, and Fellow of the Royal Society of Arts (London). He served as chairman of the Otago Historical Trust regional committee, and the national board of the New Zealand Historic Places Trust.

== Legacy ==
In 2016, the New Zealand Institute of Architects inaugurated the Ted McCoy Award, to be presented annually, for design of education facilities.

McCoy worked with photographer Gary Blackman on the book Victorian City of New Zealand (John McIndoe Ltd, Dunedin, 1968). He was a contributor to Historic Buildings of New Zealand: South Island (ed. F. Porter, Heritage New Zealand, Wellington, 1983). McCoy's career and buildings are recorded in the 2007 book, A Southern Architecture: The work of Ted McCoy, written by McCoy and published by Otago University Press.
