= Colleges of the University of Otago =

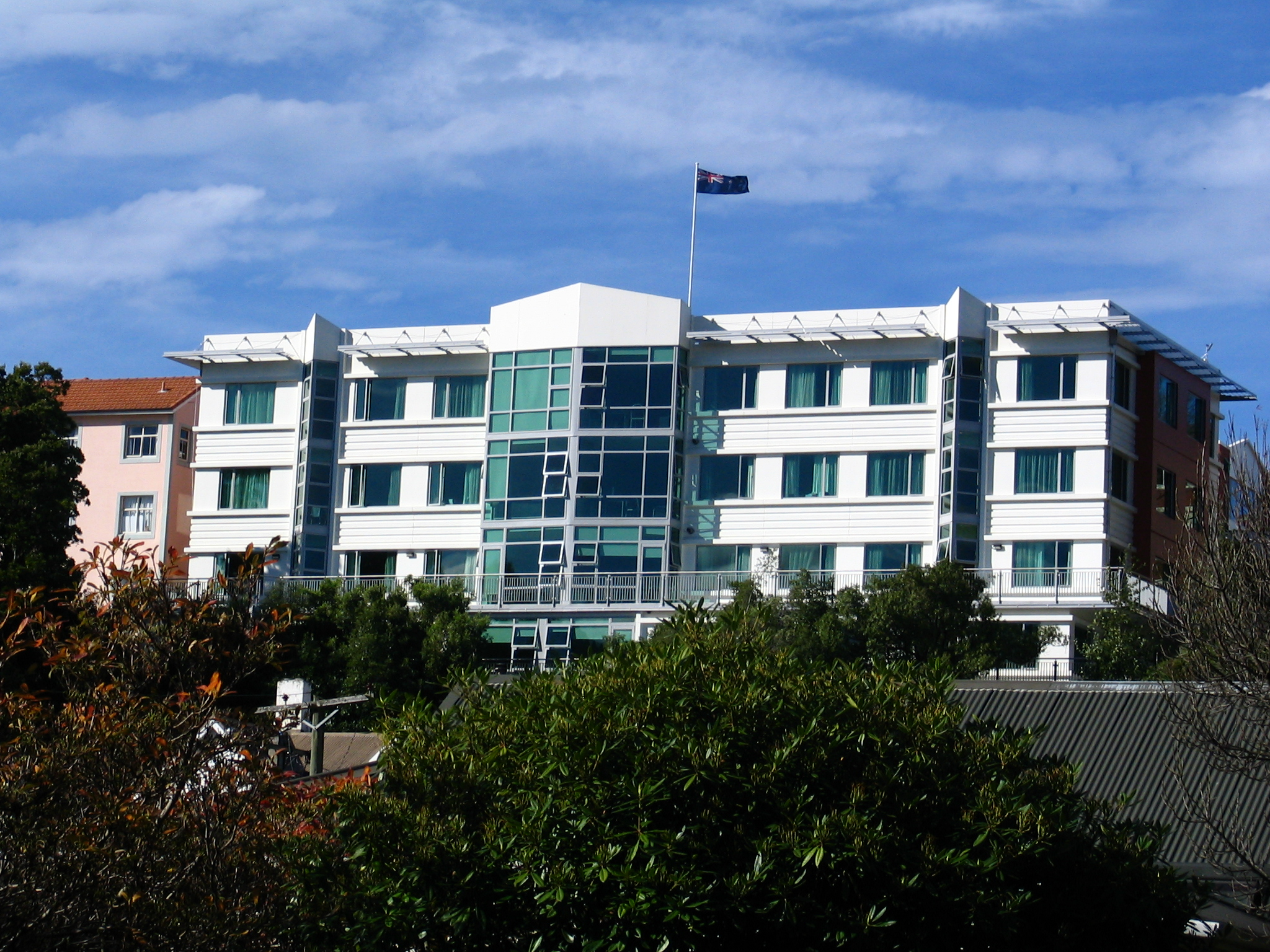
Arana College on Clyde St

The majority of first year students at the University of Otago's Dunedin campus stay in one of the fourteen residential colleges, alongside a smaller number of senior students and postgraduates. These colleges provide food, accommodation, social and welfare services, as well as some degree of additional academic support, particularly for the largest papers.

The colleges, many of which were formerly known as Halls of Residence, have a long-standing presence within the Dunedin academic society; the earliest was founded in 1893, only 24 years after the university's establishment. Since then, they have become contributing factors to the university's character and, with a combined capacity of over 3000 students, they contribute substantially to the university's provision of accommodation for new members from outside the city. While most of the colleges are university owned, three are owned by Presbyterian Church and one by the Anglican Church and two are co-institutional, accommodating students of Otago Polytechnic, as well as those of the university.

In addition, the University of Otago College of Education, founded in 1876 as the Dunedin College of Education, has acted as an education faculty for the university since a merger in 2007, though it differs in function and purpose from the residential colleges described below.

== Nature of the colleges ==
The most central halls, situated beside the university's oldest buildings, are St Margaret's College, noted for a strong academic lean, and University College (Unicol), which is the largest college, housing approximately 550 residents during the academic year. The colleges can exhibit distinctive features: Aquinas College, being amongst the smallest and farthest from the university centre, has developed a "family-like and informal atmosphere". Toroa College, formerly an international house, was almost exclusively filled by international students during this period, developing an environment with social and support aspects tailored to those special needs.

The residential colleges select students based on their marks, extracurricular activities and high school testimonials, with some colleges having application to place ratios of over 3:1. Applicants may list several colleges in their application, in case they are not selected by their first preference.

While many of the colleges only accept residents for a single year, a few do have a sizable proportion of second year returners. At some colleges, for instance Selwyn College and Knox College, the majority of new entrants stay for two or more years. The Chris Burks Memorial Bursary is awarded to a second year student resident at Carrington College. All of the colleges consist of a majority undergraduate population.

Otago's colleges are not as significant in the life of the University as those of the universities of Oxford and Cambridge. Similarly to colleges at those universities, some Otago colleges have a Master, fellows, a chapel and/or regular formal meals but, unlike Oxford and Cambridge colleges, students' primary affiliation is to the university rather than to the college and it is normal for only a small percentage, if any, of an Otago student's teaching to take place in their college.

== College ownership ==
While the majority of the residential colleges are owned by the University, they each have their own internal management structures and College Council.

Churches established the first colleges at the university, Selwyn (1893), Knox (1909) and St. Margaret's (1911). Studholme (1915) is the oldest University-owned College. Four colleges continue to be owned by churches and are governed entirely independently from the University. These are Selwyn College, Knox College, St Margaret's College, and Salmond College.

== Intercollegiate activities ==
A number of intercollegiate competitions are held, though often between pairs or subsets of the colleges. According to the university's prospectus, all colleges other than Toroa College have some inter-collegiate activities. Regular competitions include:

- Southgate Trophy and Iona Trophy between Studholme College, St Margaret's College and Salmond College
- Cameron Shield and Nevill Cup between Selwyn College and Knox College
- AC/HC Shield between Hayward College and Aquinas College
- Stuart Shield between Carrington College and Arana College

An intercollegiate rowing competition was held in May 2010 which Unicol are the current holders of. An intercollegiate basketball competition was held over August/September and the respective champions were Arana (mixed), Cumberland (girls) & Aquinas College (boys).

== List of residential colleges ==
=== Current colleges ===
Name	Colours (if app.)	Opened	Capacity	UG/PG	Website
Selwyn College		1893	170	U+P	
Knox College		1909	203	U+P	
St Margaret's College		1911	227	U	
Studholme College		1915	173	U	
Arana College		1943	401	U+P	
Carrington College		1945	224	U+P	
Aquinas College		1952 (Note: Not primarily used by students from 1983 to 1988. Reopened as a college in 1988.)	165	U	
University College		1969	518	U	
Salmond College		1971	192	U+P	
Cumberland College		1989	436	U	
Hayward College		1992	162	U	
Toroa College		1996	131	U+P	
Caroline Freeman College		2000	211	U+P	
192 Castle College		2014 (as Te Rangi Hīroa College)	121	U	
Te Rangihīroa College		2024	450	U	

The university maintains an online list.

==== Caroline Freeman College ====
Caroline Freeman College
- University of Otago Residential College
- University of Otago
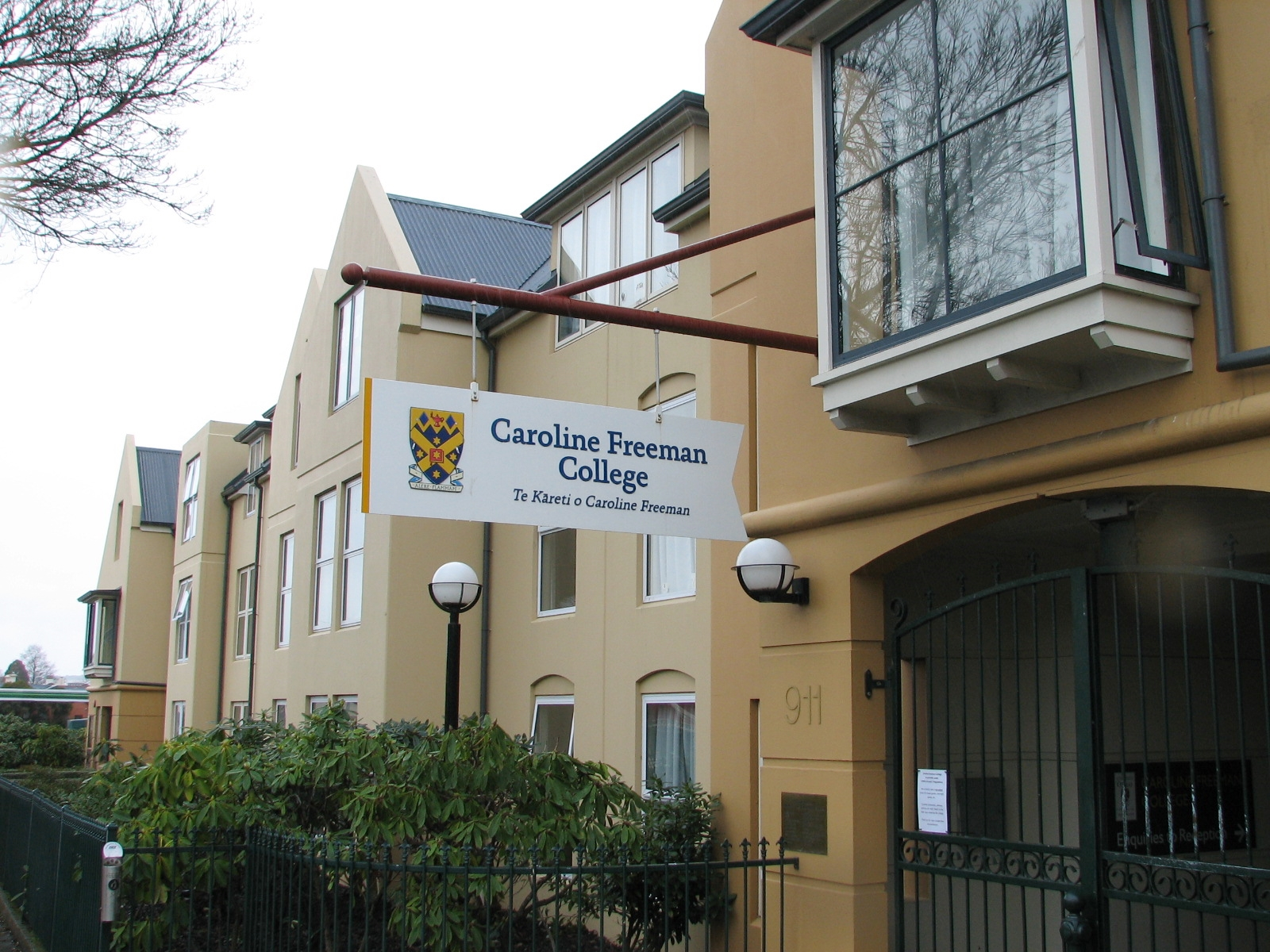
- Caroline Freeman College

- Caroline Freeman College Coat of Arms
- Location: 911 Cumberland Street
- Motto: Allere Flammam (Latin)
- Motto in English: Nourish the flame
- Founder: Dunedin City Tertiary Accommodation Trust
- Established: 2000
- Current Warden: Christina Watson
- Undergraduates: 299
- Website: otago.ac.nz/freeman-college

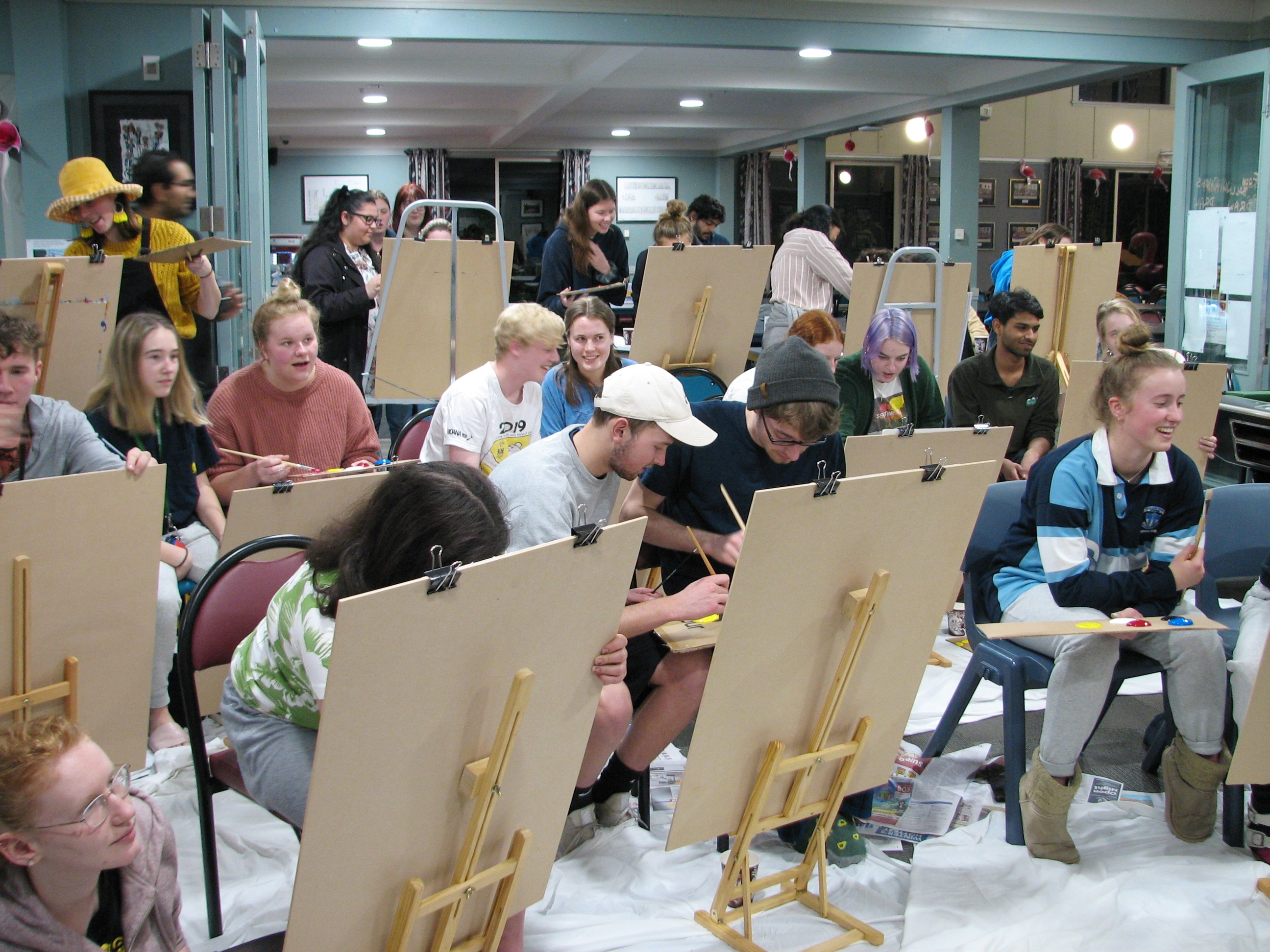
Caroline Freeman College residents take part in the annual CFC Portrait Painting competition, one of the many in-house competitions on the college's annual calendar.

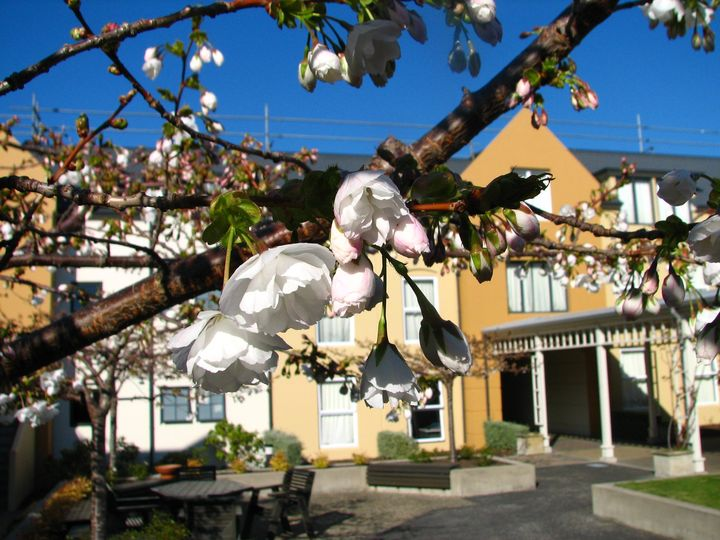
The McIvor Courtyard in springtime. Caroline Freeman College has extensive gardens and outdoor areas.

Caroline Freeman College is located a short distance north of the Otago central campus near the Dunedin Botanical Gardens. The Dunedin City Tertiary Accommodation Trust established what was City College in the year 2000 to provide accommodation for students from the University of Otago, Otago Polytechnic and the Dunedin College of Education (now University of Otago College of Education). The college was built to resemble a traditional English-style residential college with gardens, courtyards, arched entryways and covered walkways. The residential apartments surround the central common areas of the complex. These common areas include student lounges, dining room, art/music room, study areas and a library. The college has extensive garden and courtyard spaces. It is the only fully-catered Otago college based around apartment groups, having 214 rooms spread around 38 four-, five- and six-bedroom apartments.

The college “houses”, Hepburn, Sandland, McKenzie, Ford, McIvor, Mitchell and Dawson, are named after the owners of the Original Crown Land Grants of Block 34 North Dunedin in 1858.

At the start of 2018, college ownership transferred entirely to the University of Otago, and the college was renamed (from City College to Caroline Freeman College), to honour Caroline Freeman, the University of Otago's first female graduate. Since the start of 2018 the college has been a residential collegiate community for only first-year students of the University of Otago.

In late 2020, Caroline Freeman College assumed oversight of Abbey College, an Otago-owned residential college for post-graduate students. The Abbey College site is located directly across Cumberland Street from Caroline Freeman College. The Abbey site was refurbished, repurposed and renamed Caroline Freeman College – East. The original Abbey College buildings were all renamed to reflect the flora and fauna of the site – Rātā, Kōwhai, Tūī and Kererū. CFC East provides accommodation for 85 residents bringing the total resident population to 299. CFC East has a variety of room types including two and three-bedroom "pods", single en-suite and shared en-suite rooms. Extensive common space, lounge and dining areas and outdoor areas are all part of the East campus.

=== Former colleges ===
- Abbey College
- Dominican Hall
- Helensburgh House
- Wesley Hall

== Descriptions of the colleges ==
A number of colleges have their own articles: Caroline Freeman College, Selwyn College, Knox College, St Margaret's College, Studholme College, Arana College, Carrington College, Aquinas College, University College, Salmond College, and Cumberland College.

From the founding of the first college, Selwyn College, in 1893, to the most recent, Te Rangihīroa College, (founded in 2014 and relocated in 2025), the architecture, motivations, expectations and models for residential colleges in Dunedin have changed substantially. None of the earliest three colleges were owned by the university, despite this being the case for the vast majority of later colleges, and a significant fraction were originally single-sex (including all but one of the affiliated colleges and several university-owned colleges) whereas all colleges are now co-educational. As such, the residential colleges represent a wide range of buildings, compositions and ethoses.

=== Toroa College ===
Toroa College was opened by the university in 1996 as Toroa International House to cater for growing numbers of overseas students. It was the first residential college to offer self-catering accommodation. Since then, it has become Toroa College and has opened access to domestic students. The college takes an active approach to environmental issues and has an environmental committee charged with encouraging sustainable living in the residential college context.

=== Abbey College ===
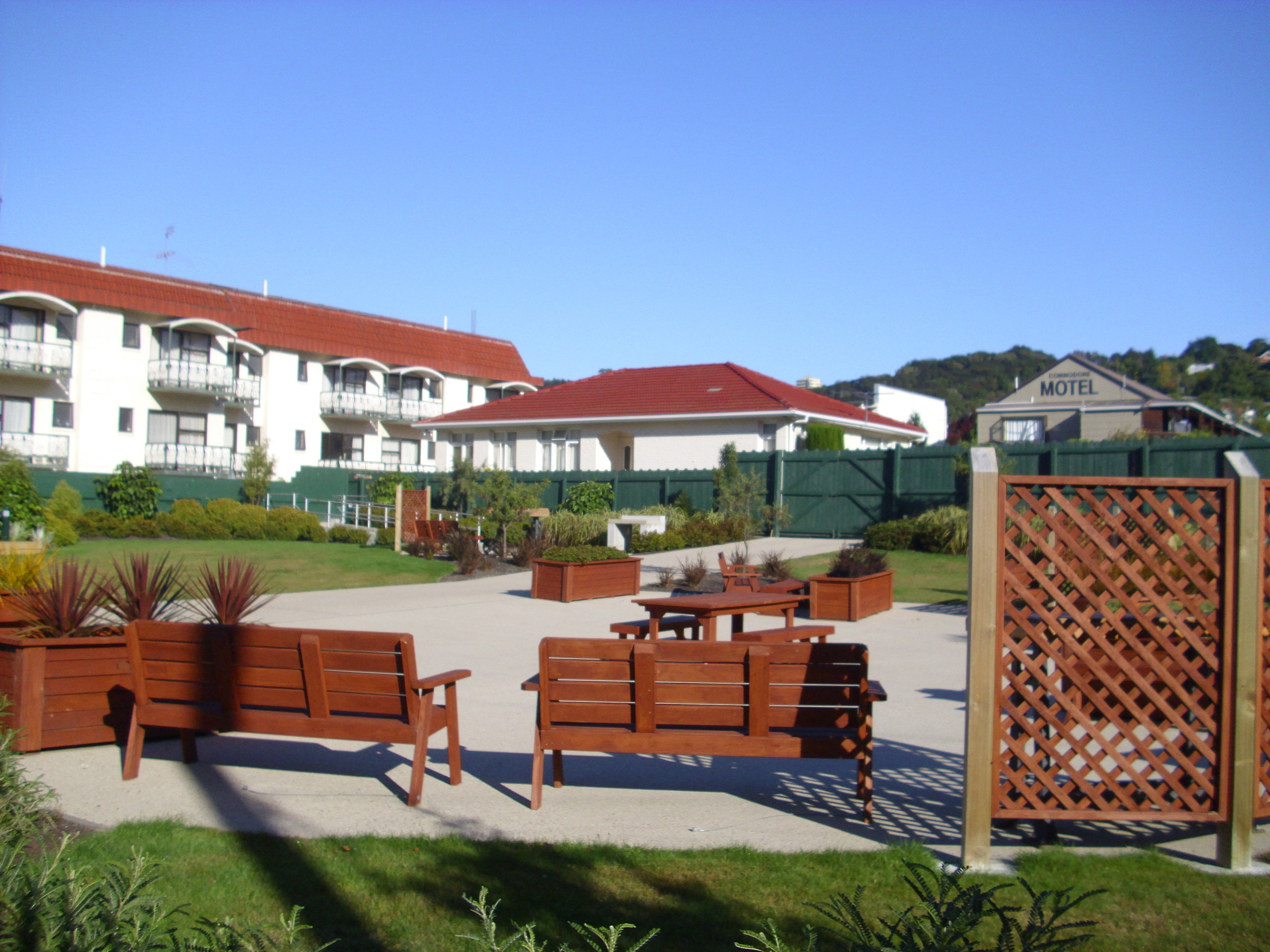
Abbey College

Abbey College was a postgraduate residential college at the University of Otago from 2008 to 2020. It was founded in 2008 to meet the needs of the university's growing graduate and postgraduate population. The college had a range of facilities developed for the hotel/motel previously occupying the complex, such as a swimming pool and sauna.

It had a strong international representation with two-thirds of members from outside New Zealand. The first Head of College was Gretchen Kivell (February 2008 – June 2013) followed by Dr Charles Tustin (July 2013 to November 2016).

Abbey College was closed in 2020. In 2021, the building was used as a wing of nearby Caroline Freeman College.

== See also ==
- List of residential colleges
- Collegiate university – though the University of Otago is not fully collegiate, it necessarily shares some of the characteristics of such a university
