= Selwyn College, Otago =

Residential college affiliated to the University of Otago in Dunedin, New Zealand

Coordinates: 45.86225°S 170.51481°E

Selwyn College
- University of Otago Residential College
- University of Otago
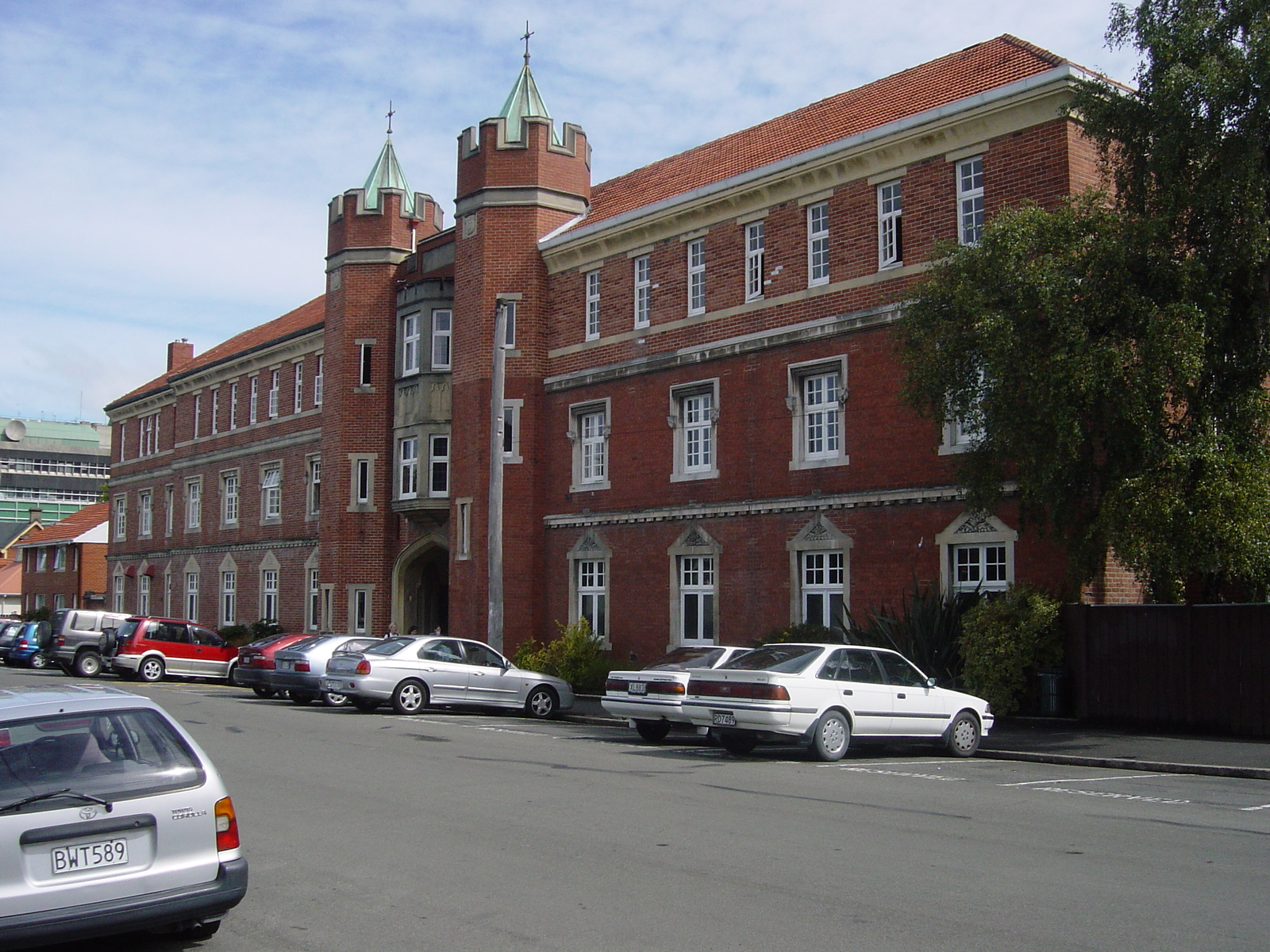

- Selwyn College Coat of Arms
- Location: Castle St
- Motto: Vitai Lampada Tradunt (Latin)
- Motto in English: They Hand on the Torch of Life
- Founder: Bishop Nevill
- Established: 1893
- Status: Affiliated
- Warden: Sagato (Ziggy) Lesa
- Undergraduates: 200 (approx)
- Postgraduates: <10
- Website: selwyn.ac.nz

Selwyn College is a residential college affiliated to the University of Otago in Dunedin, New Zealand. It was founded by Bishop Samuel Tarratt Nevill as a theological college training clergy for the Anglican Church and as a hall of residence for students attending the university. It is named after George Augustus Selwyn, the first Bishop of New Zealand and is owned by the Anglican Diocese of Dunedin. It was opened on 15 January 1893. It was Otago's first residential college and on the model of an English university college it included students of all subjects. Women were admitted in 1983. The main building is listed as a Category II Historic Place. Selwyn is one of the most popular colleges in Dunedin, its 214 available places oversubscribed every year.

Bishop Nevill was the pioneer of the Oxbridge-esque collegiate system at Otago and founded Selwyn college in 1893.

== College life ==
=== Competitions and events ===
In 1930 Selwyn College and College House (a University of Canterbury hall of residence) began an annual sporting and cultural exchange. This still occurs with the Principal's and Warden's Cup being added into the prize mix after the 1980s. The exchange historically concludes with a Boat Race between the two colleges, with Selwyn winning the race in 2015. Selwyn is generally not involved with the OUSA Orientation events, such as the toga parade, instead holding its own events, such as the Ori Ball. In 1932, initiations at Selwyn College were started including the Turner Tossing Trophy (now replaced with the Homage Run) and the Leith Run in 1935. The Lindskii Battle and the 21sters Ball are still annual events at the college and are immensely popular with the residents.

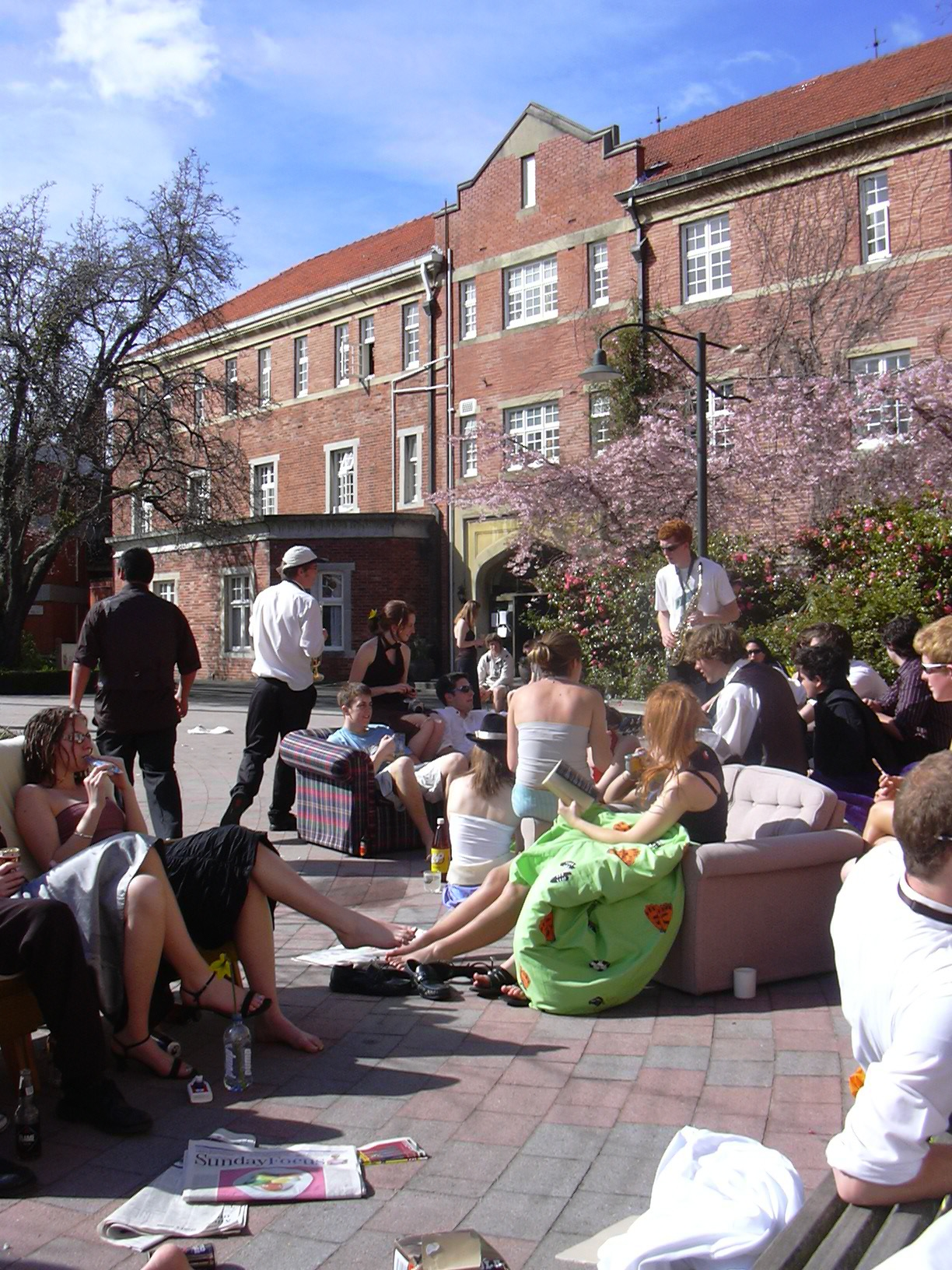
Selwyn College's Quad

Selwyn College and Knox College also compete for the Nevill Cup, a cultural competition, and the Cameron Shield, a sporting competition. These are intense contests, fiercely fought out each year. As of 2015 Selwyn college holds both The Cameron Shield and The Nevill Cup.

=== Selwyn College Students' Association (SCSA) ===
The Selwyn College Students' Association is an incorporated society consisting of all current residents of the college, with membership automatic upon entry. The SCSA is responsible for maintaining the student life of the college, including managing the Cameron Shield and Nevill Cup with Knox College and the exchange with College House. A number of social events populate the student calendar, notably Selwyn's own O-Week and ReO schedules. The SCSA is also charged with preserving the rich history and traditions laid down by those who have gone before.

The General Committee of the Selwyn College Students' Association is an elected panel of second-year residents who run the college's student life. Members have various responsibilities that concern their different roles.

=== 2018 nicknaming controversy ===
In 2018 it was reported that the Selwyn College Students' Association's annual general meeting included a tradition in which second-year students voted on and publicly announced coded nicknames for first-year residents, several of which referred to their appearance or perceived sexual behaviour. The practice, described by some former recipients as bullying and by others as light-hearted, was reported by student magazine Critic Te Arohi to have run since at least 2009. Following the reports, the college's board of governors said it was 'extremely disturbed' by the practice, and the Students' Association agreed to end it, have staff observe future meetings, and apologise to affected students.

== Building history ==
=== All Saints' church ===
The college is sited behind All Saints' Church, Dunedin on Cumberland Street which is both the college chapel and with the college buildings form a larger Anglican precinct. The church's nave was opened in 1865, designed by the partnership of Mason & Clayton although it is not entirely clear if William Mason (William Mason (architect)) or W.H. Clayton (William Clayton (architect)) was responsible. Some sources favour Clayton. The transepts and chancel added in 1873 were certainly the work of Mason. The church's principally red brick construction perhaps set the theme for the later complex although its Early English Gothic style (English Gothic architecture, Gothic Revival architecture) is in contrast with the main college buildings' domestic Tudor manner (Tudor style architecture).

All Saints' is a significant structure. It reflects the arrival in New Zealand of the influence of the Oxford Movement and The Ecclesiological Society, developments in thought about the Gothic Revival epitomised by the work of William Butterfield (1814–1900). His All Saints, Margaret Street in London had been completed in 1859 and one supposes was known to the designers of its Dunedin namesake. The latter's slate roof has been replaced with decramastic tiles and its east and south walls have been rendered in cement which rather spoils its appearance and reduces its complementarity with the principal college buildings. (There are plans to remedy some of these defects.) The church hall immediately to the north is a wooden structure which was rendered in cement in the 1960s. The vicarage site is immediately to the north again, the current vicarage is of mid-20th-century origin.

=== Early outlay ===
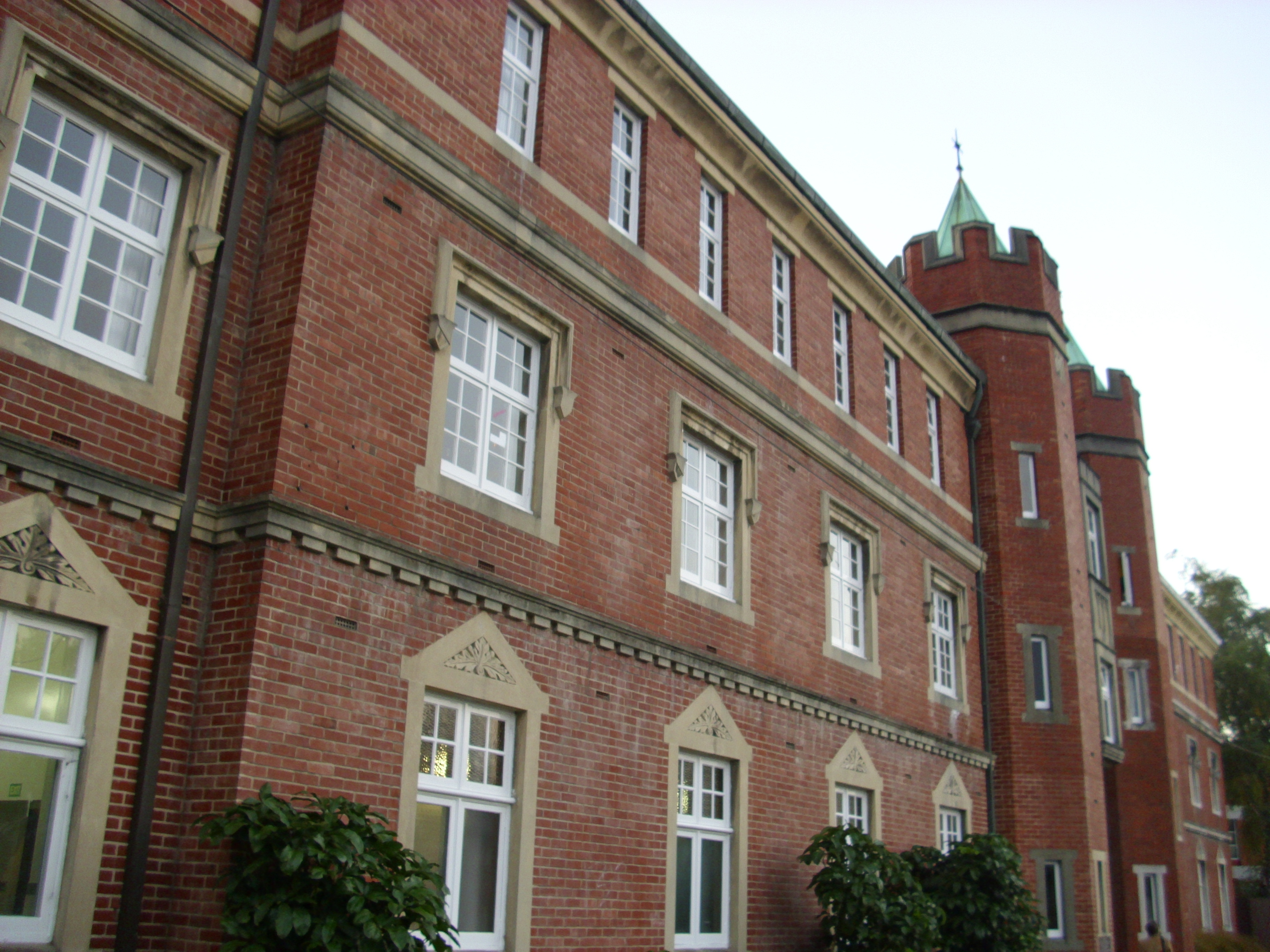
Castle St facade

In 1891 work started on the first college building behind the church and facing Castle Street to the design of J.A. Burnside (1856–1920). It appears to have been complete by October 1892 and was dedicated on 25 January the following year. Burnside also designed Transit House (a blue stone mansion in Park St) and the oldest part of the Otago Settlers Museum. His building for the college is the range to the north of the archway, including one of its towers, to first floor height. He seems to have anticipated its later extrapolation into the full range with the central archway and two towers, the arch centred on the unusual, gabled chancel of All Saints'. In red brick in the Domestic Tudor Gothic style it uses the same manner employed at Selwyn College, Cambridge which is perhaps not an accident. (Sir Arthur Blomfield's chapel there was completed in 1895.) Indeed, these two Selwyn Colleges' histories are indirectly linked since, prior to the foundation of the Selwyn College in Cambridge, Bishop Nevill had urged that that institution should be established in New Zealand, rather than in England. While modest by comparison, especially this first small portion of the later, larger range, the Castle Street building was a pleasing exercise in the manner and capable of expansion into a more impressive composition.

Just that happened in 1929 to 1930 when Burnside's building was extended into the present range. Adding a third floor to Burnside's structure it formed the arch with its towers and its oriel window and extended in two reaches to the south, the further slightly set back from the street. This was the work of, or certainly supervised by, H. McDowell Smith (1887–1965) and cost 13,840 pounds. There was a dining room on the ground floor with a bay window looking into the quadrangle with good stone lattice work and the interior decorated in period style. The whole building, with its archway, makes a clear reference to Hampton Court Palace in England.

=== Later extensions ===
In 1950 and 1956 McDowell Smith was called on again to add another large building to the complex. Sargood Hall, named after a major benefactor, extends at right angles from the southern reach of the Castle Street range to form the south flank of the interior quadrangle. This too is in red brick in the Domestic Tudor style which by this time, after the second world war, represented a bold and expensive decision in New Zealand. The whole project appears to have cost something more than 25,000 pounds. The building is free standing with a narrow passage between it and the Castle Street range. It is two storeyed. Its principal, north face has a central break front with a pleasingly modelled entrance and the Hall's name in raised relief in a stone fascia above. There are also forward reaching fronts at either end of the main elevation.

When the College Board next determined to extend the complex, in 1966, it again wished to build "on traditional lines", that is in period style. It wanted another three-storeyed wing to the north of the Castle Street range, perhaps meaning to complete the quadrangle. Its efforts to raise the necessary 80,000 pounds were unsuccessful. It decided instead to build three separate three storeyed residential blocks and commissioned one from Miller, White and Dunn, a Dunedin architectural practice. In the event only one was built, Nevill House, which opened on 4 March 1973. This is a small tower, immediately to the north of the Castle Street range and close to the street, of Modernist design. Its concrete framework is visibly expressed and it has red brick infills to contextualise it.

A further extension was made with another free standing building to the north again, to house the library which was completed on 1 August 1976. It was called the Northcroft Library, after another generous donor and was designed by John Harrison (b. 1935). Amidst controversy the library was dispersed in 1988. This is another Modernist building but now in contrasting materials. The most dissonant structure in the group it has steeply inclined slab roofs and extensive areas of glazing.

In 1988 too the first of three buildings providing self-contained flats was completed, Irvine House. Further to the north Millar House and Newcombe House were completed in 1989. These were all designed by Roger Dodd (1939–2001). Millar and Newcombe Houses face Dundas Street, the thoroughfare linking Castle to Cumberland Street at the north end of the city block containing Selwyn College. The two are linked to form an archway giving access to the quadrangle from the north. All three of these buildings are two storeyed and are finished in unpainted, rendered cement. Their forms are those of hipped roof houses. They are rather plain and the northward linked pair are set behind a brick wall along the street.

In 1993 the archway of the Castle Street range was shut off for security reasons with a large glass wall incorporating a door of the same material. The view from the street to the All Saints chancel remained. It has since been eclipsed by the construction of a solid walled cross way joining the ground floor of each wing through the archway.

=== Summary ===
There are some other college buildings more or less integral to the group but the Castle Street range and Sargood Hall with their orientation around All Saints church show a sustained and successful effort to build a university hall of residence in the revived Tudor style. If it is less developed than its rival Knox College's suite it is perhaps more simply attractive.

== Selwynites ==
Name	Entered	Notability	Reference
Lord Porritt		Politics, Medicine: Former Governor-General of New Zealand and physician to the Queen.	
John Wright	1972	Sport: New Zealand Representative Cricketer & Captain. Former Coach of Indian & New Zealand Cricket Teams.	
David Kirk		Sport: Captain of 1987 World Cup winning All Black side and former CEO Fairfax Group	
Bill English		Politics: Former New Zealand Prime Minister and former Minister of Finance	
Josh Blackie		Sport: Professional rugby player	
Sir Geoffrey Cox		Media: Journalist	
Te Radar (Andrew J. Lumsden)		Media: Comedian	

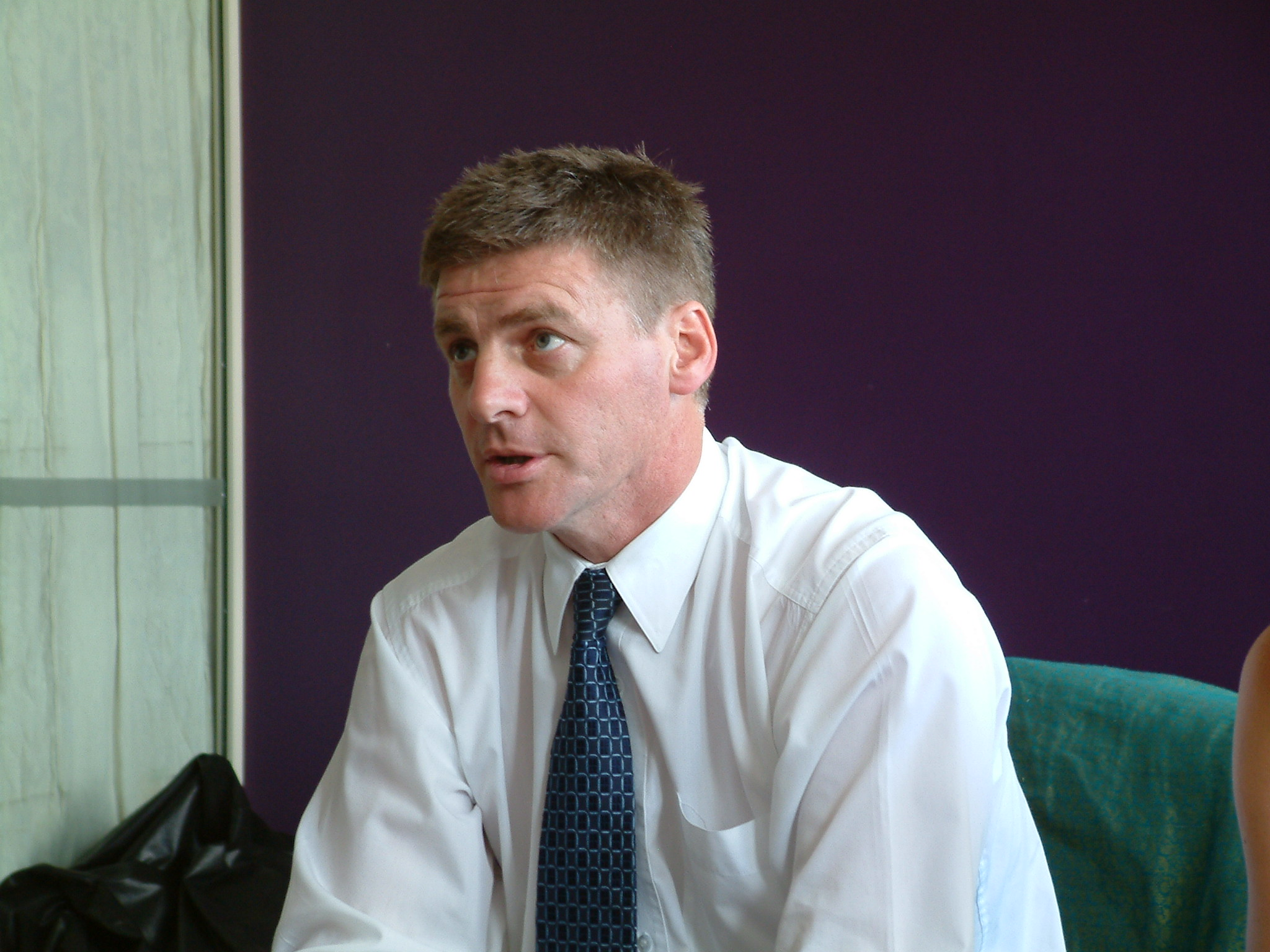
Bill English

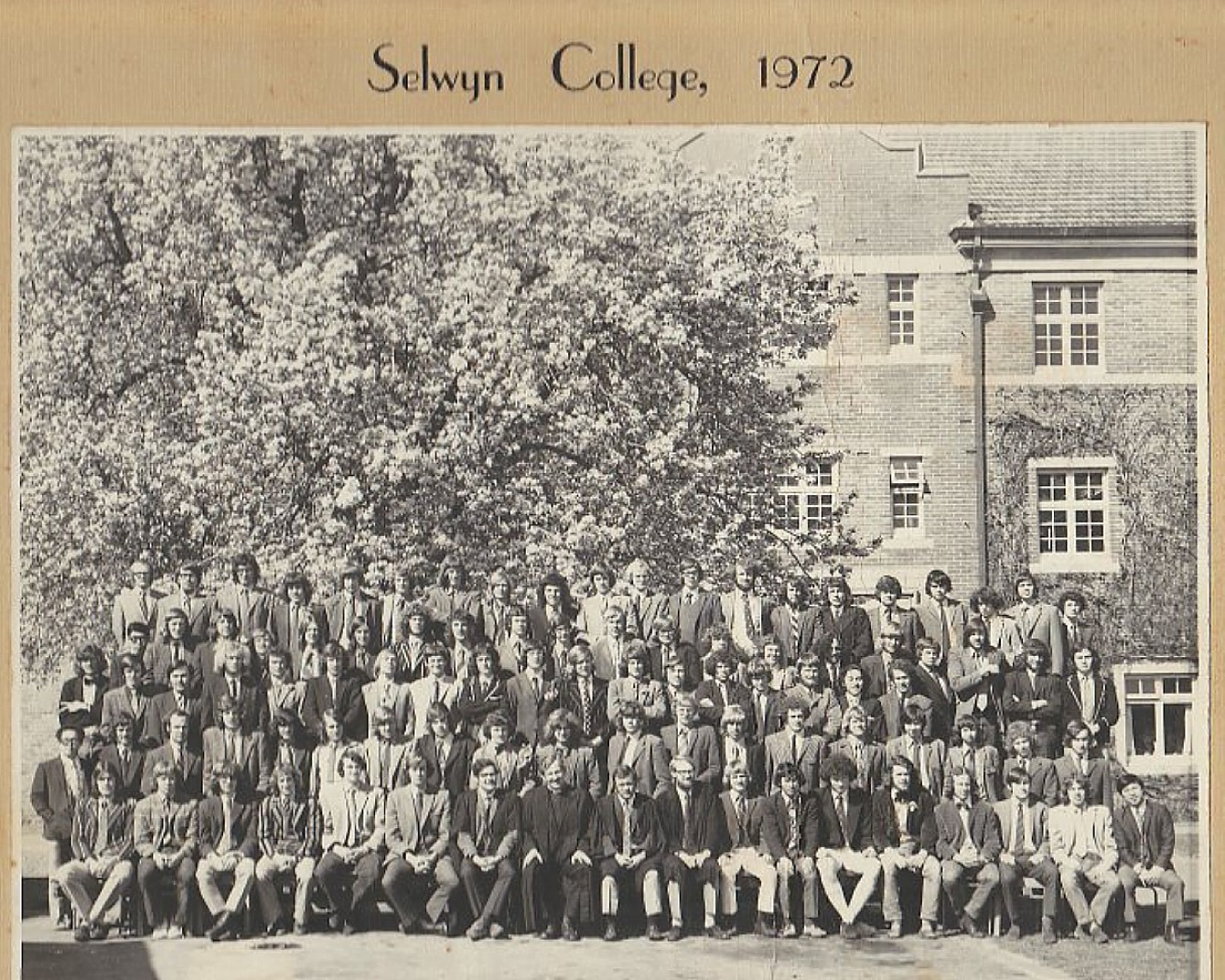
"Selwyn College 1972"

== In media ==
Comedian-turned-travel documentary presenter Michael Palin visited the college in his 1996 documentary Full Circle with Michael Palin on his journey through New Zealand.

== Sources ==
- Charles Croot, Dunedin Churches Past and Present Dunedin, NZ; Otago Settlers Association, 1999. ISBN 0-473-03979-6.
- Ray Hargreaves, Selwyn College's First Century Dunedin, NZ; Centennial Committee, Selwyn College Board of Governors, 1993. ISBN 0-473-01954-X.
