= Carrington College =

Carrington College may refer to:

- Carrington College (US), is a network of for-profit private colleges based out of Sacramento, California
- Carrington College, Otago, a hall of residence at the University of Otago, Dunedin, New Zealand
