= Te Rangihīroa College =

Residential college in New Zealand

Coordinates: 45.8691°S 170.5170°E

- University of Otago Residential College
- University of Otago
- The college seen from Albany St, 2025
- Location: Albany St
- Established: 2014
- Named for: Te Rangihīroa (Sir Peter Buck)
- Undergraduates: 450
- Website: Official website

Te Rangihīroa College, in Dunedin, New Zealand, is the University of Otago's newest residential college, accommodating 450 students.

== History ==
=== 192 Castle ===
Te Kāreti o Castle in 2025

The college opened as Te Rangi Hīroa College in 2014 in a former hotel, and took its name from Otago's first Māori graduate Te Rangihīroa, also known as Sir Peter Buck.

The hotel, LivingSpace, was converted in 2011 from a building built in 1958 for leather tanning company Glendermid. The university bought the hotel for $6.75 million in 2013.

The original college building has remained in use under the new name 192 Castle College Te Kāreti o Castle. It can accommodate 125 students in ensuite rooms and can provide female-only accommodation and alcohol-free accommodation. The university said 192 Castle College would be run as an annex to nearby Cumberland College until at least 2030, when it would possibly become a part of the health and hospital precinct.

=== Relocation ===
In 2019, Te Rangi Hīroa College's site was selected to provide land for Dunedin's new hospital. A new college was proposed, at a cost of $90 million.

A site was chosen in Albany St, North Dunedin, which had been the university's music studio, built in 1967 as a radio studio for the New Zealand Broadcasting Corporation.

Te Rangihīroa College reopened in its new purpose-built building in 2024. The move prompted a slight correction to the college's name to the style preferred by Te Rangihīroa, at the request of his iwi descendants, Ngāti Mutunga.

== Present college ==
The college entrance, off Forth St, Dunedin.

The new college is a 5-Star Green Star building owned and operated by the university's collegiate life services division. It features ensuite rooms and a cinema. As of 2025, the college's tautiaki or warden is Kara Whaley.
