= Studholme College =

Residential college, University of Otago, New Zealand

Coordinates: 45.863055°S 170.518804°E

- University of Otago Residential College
- University of Otago
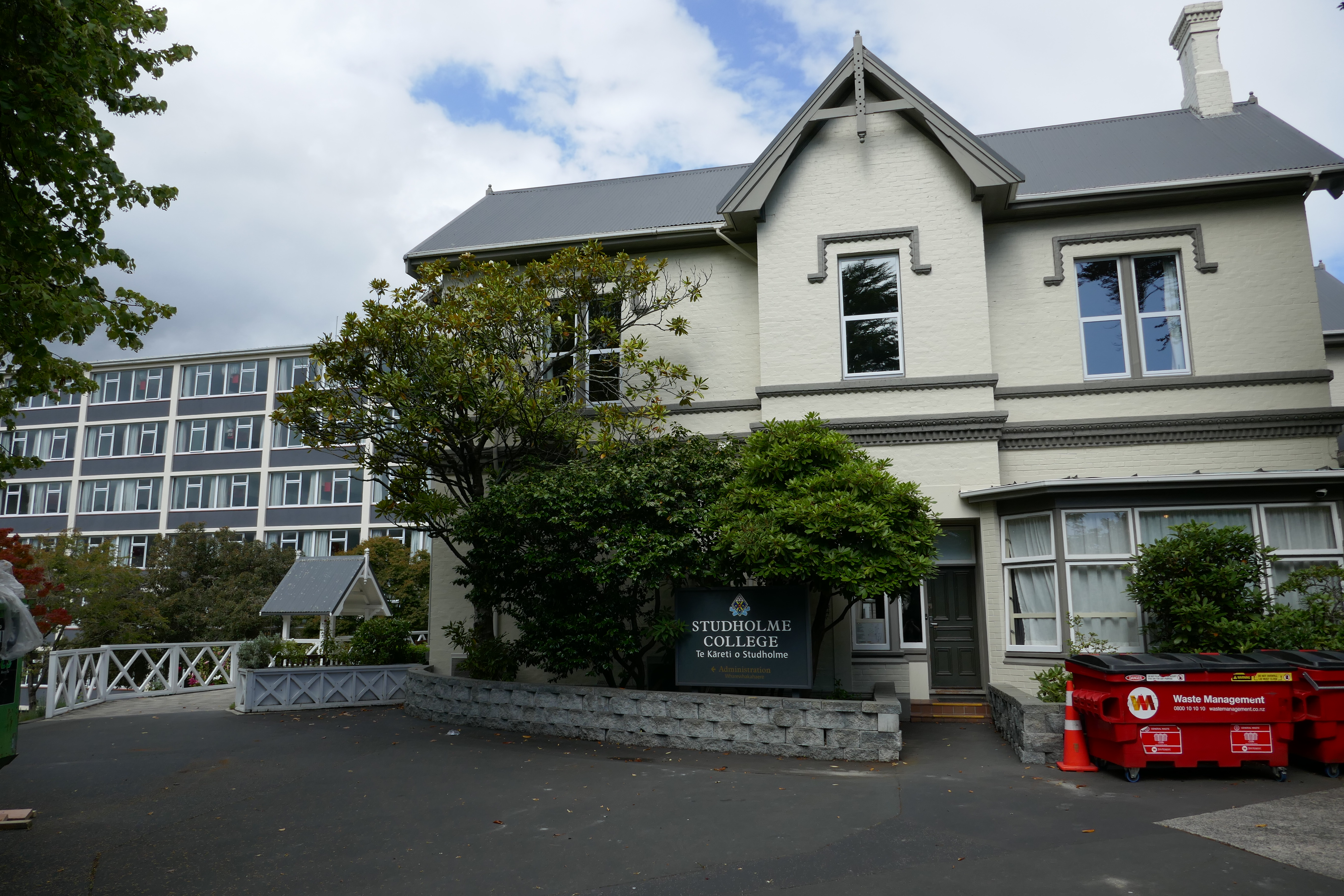

- Studholme College Coat of Arms
- Location: Clyde St
- Motto: Scientia et Amor Domum Illuminant (Latin)
- Motto in English: Knowledge and Love Illuminate the Home
- Founder: University of Otago
- Established: 1915
- Former names: Studholme House, Studholme Hall
- Head of College: Johnny Nu'u
- Undergraduates: 185
- Website: otago.ac.nz/studholme

Studholme College is a residential college of the University of Otago in Dunedin, New Zealand situated on Clyde Street, a few minutes walk northeast of the university. Housing approximately 185 students, it is one of the smaller colleges in the region. It was founded as Studholme House in 1915 to provide facilities for domestic science students. The college maintains close links with the Department of Human Nutrition (the successor to the university's School of Home Science), though it now accepts students from all faculties.

== History ==
=== A House for Home Science ===
Studholme College was established in 1915 as Studholme House, to provide accommodation for students attending the School of Home Science, which had been opened in 1911. It was named Studholme in honour of Colonel John Studholme who, after seeing the merits of home economics departments in US universities, had worked for the establishment of a School of Home Science in New Zealand. He was unsuccessful in establishing a chair at Canterbury College, so turned to the University of Otago, offering a personal endowment of £600 as an incentive.

A search was conducted for a Lady Professor of Home Science and Professor Winifred Boys-Smith – a science and domestic science teacher at Cheltenham Ladies' College – was elected to the new chair. Over the first few years, Professor Boys-Smith allowed some training to occur in her own home and housed a few of the domestic science students.

A more sustainable solution for student accommodation was achieved through the building of Studholme House in 1915 at the corner of Leith and Union Streets. While the school already had its own teaching facilities ("The Old Tin Shed", vacated by the School of Mines), they provided limited space and some degree of teaching was undertaken at the new House.

Expansions occurred, in the form of two more Union Street houses, but by 1926 additional accommodation at nearby Arana had to be arranged to fill the deficit of space. Further houses were built over the next ten years and, by 1937, plans for a larger hall of residence had gained sufficient momentum for a substantial fund-raising campaign to begin. Due to the outbreak of war, difficulties finding qualified staff (exacerbated by a wage disparity between hostel and university teaching staff) and general financial hardship, plans were postponed and a variety of interim measures enacted, sending students to board and the use of university-lent accommodation.

During this period, the fortieth anniversary of the school occurred and, as part of the celebrations, a coat of arms approved by the Lord Lyon King of Arms in Scotland was presented to Studholme House.

=== The development of a Hall ===
In 1955, encouragement came through the Minister of Finance, who promised to match money spent, pound-for-pound, on a new hall of residence and to provide a government grant of £18,400 for the building of a dining room block to train dietitians – the latter being completed in 1959. The large-scale campaign for funding took off again and, eventually, a contract price of £123,989, given by W.H. Naylor, Ltd was accepted. Funds were provided by the government, the work of local appeal committees around the country, private companies, associations and private gifts, as substantial as £10,000 (from Miss Annie E. Stevenson, one of the first graduates of the School). By 1961, a new ferro-concrete, six-story block was built, housing 109 students in single rooms, and four wardens. A number of improvements and additions were carried out on the original house, which subsequently provided a student common room, staff room and library, as well as the existing kitchen block.

During the school's Golden Jubilee in 1961, the new Studholme Hall was officially opened by the then Governor-General, Sir Charles Lyttelton who commented, on the occasion, that "there is no substitute, in terms of social progress, for living together in a community."

=== Recent history ===
In 1994, sixteen further bedrooms were added, bringing the total number of beds to 136.

A further 42 students live in six adjacent houses, which were acquired and fully integrated into the College in 1998. The houses are named after four former Wardens – Sally Keeling, Joan Dunn; Mary Dunn and Margaret Wallace – and Jane Malthus, who was a long serving member and chairwoman of the Studholme College Council.

On 20 May 2006, a resident student gave birth to a baby girl on a toilet in Studholme, and threw the dead newborn out of a window in a plastic bag. The student was convicted of infanticide, the conviction was later cancelled.

== Bibliography ==
- Collins, Jenny (7 January 2014). "Home Science at the University of Otago". Dictionary of Educational History in Australia and New Zealand (DEHANZ).
