= John Burnside (disambiguation) =

John Burnside (born 1955) was a Scottish writer.

John Burnside may also refer to:

- John Burnside (plantation owner) (1800–1881), owner of the Houmas House
- John Burnside (inventor) (1916–2008), gay activist and inventor of the teleidoscope
- John Burnside (architect) (1857–1920), New Zealand architect
