= Arana College =

Residential college at University of Otago

Coordinates: 45.863574°S 170.517522°E

- University of Otago Residential College
- University of Otago
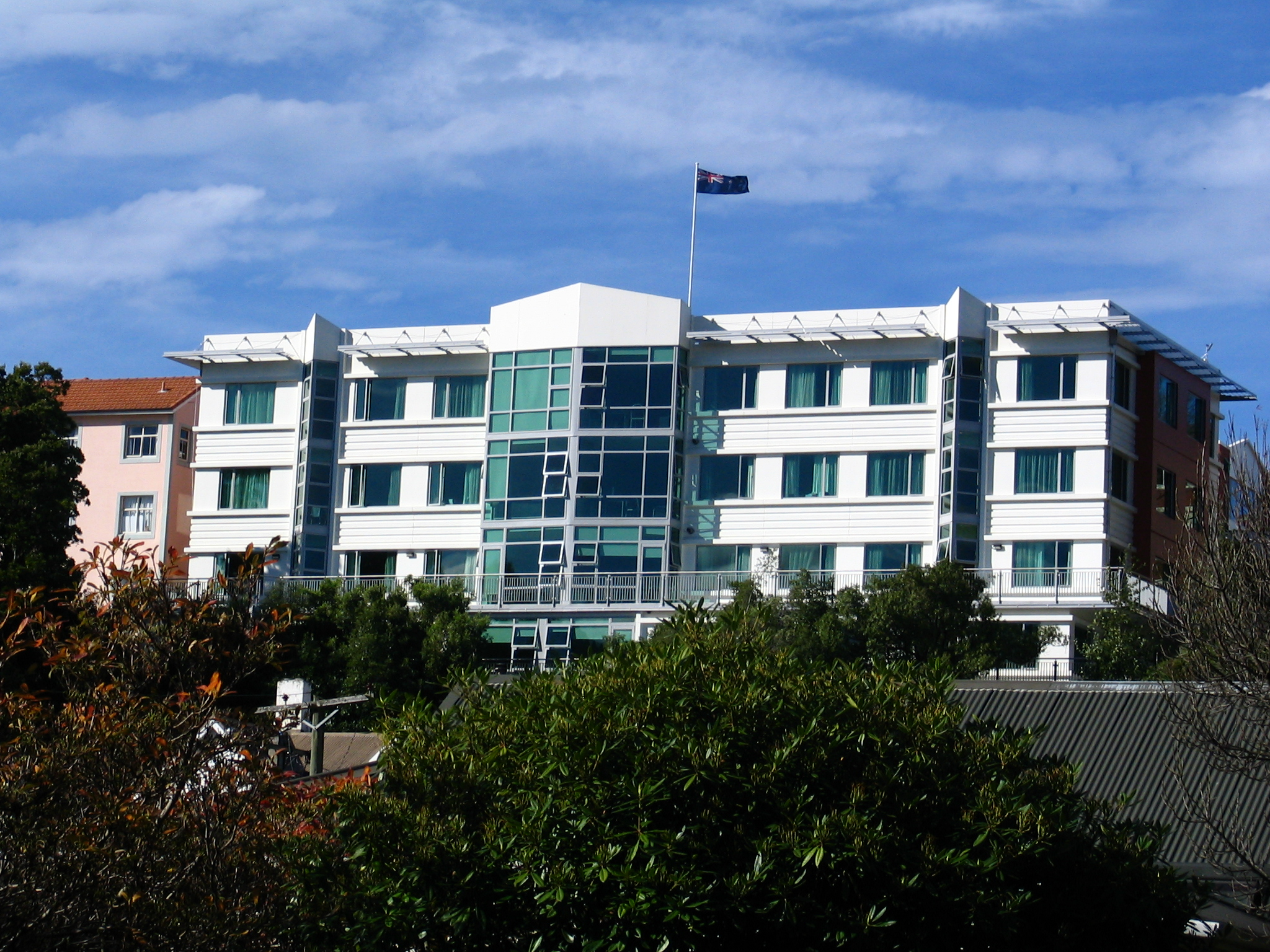

- Arana College Coat of Arms
- Location: Clyde St
- Motto: Takina te hoe kia rite (Māori)
- Motto in English: Wield the Paddles Together
- Founder: Stuart Halls Residence Council
- Established: 1943
- Warden: Ruben Katigbak
- Undergraduates: 397 (approx.)
- Website: www.otago.ac.nz/arana/

Arana College is a residential college of the University of Otago in Dunedin, New Zealand, founded in 1943 by the Rev. Harold W.Turner and the Stuart Residence Halls Council. The name "Arana" is a Māori transliteration of "Allen", chosen to honour Sir James Allen, a former Vice Chancellor (1903–1909) and Chancellor (1909–1912) of the University of Otago. The current warden is Ruben Katigbak.

The main administration areas of Arana are based in what was once Sir James Allen's Queen Anne-style mansion, with residents accommodated in 4 main buildings and 18 houses. The college is located immediately to the northeast of the central campus, at the top of a medium-sized but steep rise known as Piripi Hill (a corruption of "Botanic Hill", after the nearby first site of the Dunedin Botanic Gardens). It overlooks the Otago Campus only 200 metres from the Registry Clock Tower, a notable feature of the University campus. The University of Otago College of Education, Otago Polytechnic and the Dunedin Botanical Garden are all within easy walking distance.

== History ==
Originally, Arana housed 27 male residents in a property purchased by the university but administered by the Stuart Residence Halls Council. Accommodation initially consisted of Allen's former home but, under pressure for space, former World War II Nissen huts were soon erected. Public subscriptions and government funding, as part of the Colombo Plan were used to build permanent buildings, the Colombo (opened in 1964 housing 56 residents) and Bates (opened in 1968 housing 48 residents) wings. The international students brought to Arana as part of the Colombo Plan have added a distinctive international flavour. Throughout the college's history houses on surrounding Clyde, Dundas, Leith and St David Sts have been purchased in order to provide extra accommodation.

Arana has accepted female students since 1978. The 1980s saw a downturn in numbers of new students at the university, and the College faced challenges in attracting sufficient residents. The college survived by temporarily converting surrounding houses to self-contained accommodation. Luckily, by the late 1980s the University of Otago was again in a growth phase, and Arana College truly began to develop into a residential village.

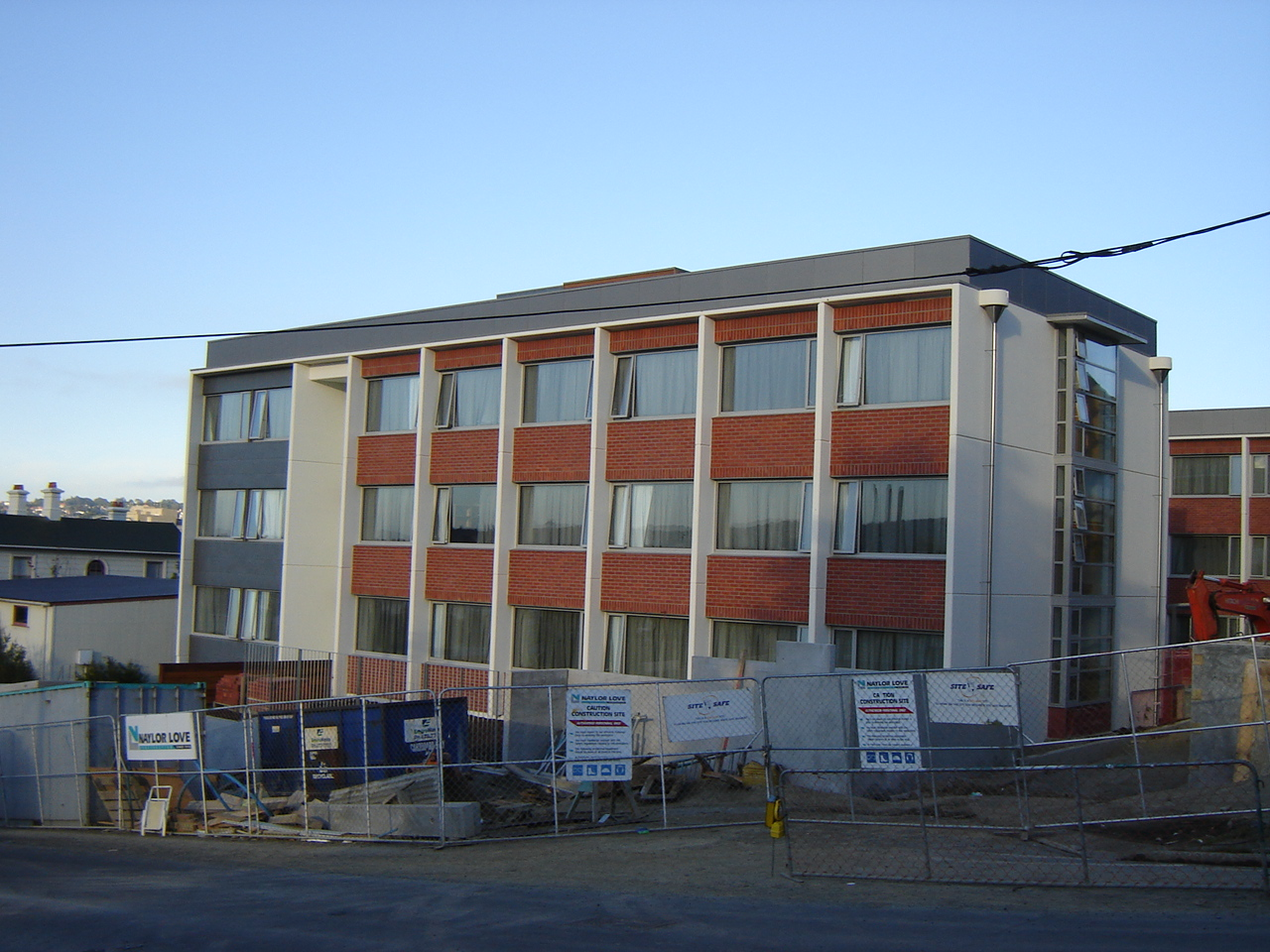
Arana Hall redevelopment 2006

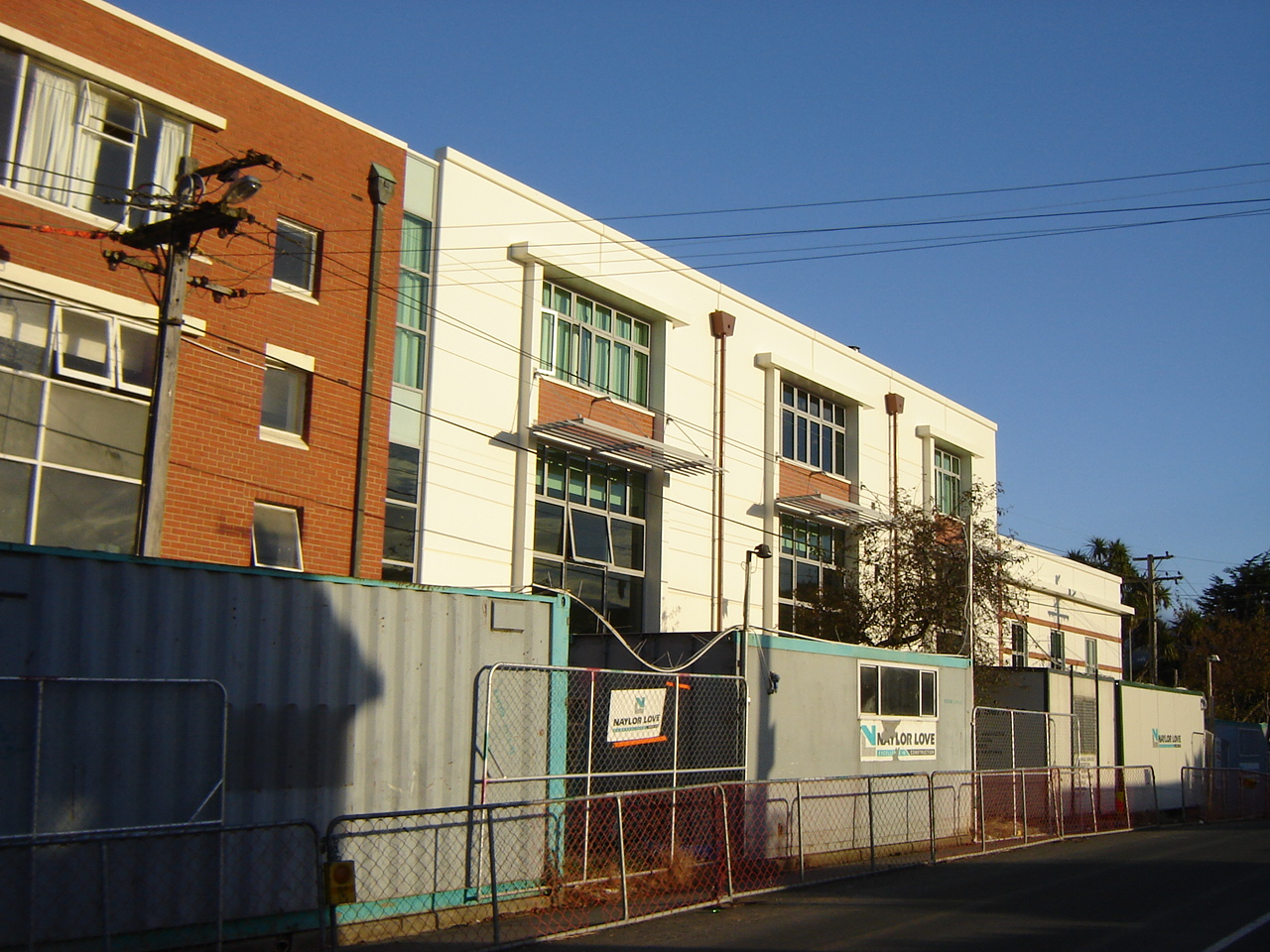
Arana Hall redevelopment 2006

In 1994 Turner Wing was opened, housing 27 residents. In 2005-2006 Arana College undertook a major upgrade of the central facilities and increased the number of rooms available to students by building two new accommodation blocks, Leith View housing 60 residents and Rawiri (a transliteration of St David) housing 104 residents. The college now houses approximately 397 residents in total between its main buildings and surrounding houses.

== Coat of arms ==
Arana and Carrington, the two colleges at Otago that were created and originally administered by the Stuart Residence Halls Council, are now fully administered by the University of Otago. The arms of Arana come from the arms of the Stuart Residence Halls Council, whose motto is Non tantum aedificatio sed sodalitas (not only education but community), with the addition of a three-pointed label (as for an eldest son). The Arana motto is: Takina te hoe kia rite (wield the paddles together). The College colours are maroon and blue.

== World record attempts ==
In 2013, Arana College students Laurie Evans and Bryn Kerr attempted to break the world record for 'Most grapes caught in the mouth in one minute', at an event organised by the Otago University Student Association. Since then, Arana has maintained a strong culture of record attempts, with Arana College warden Jamie Gilbertson encouraging residents to 'challenge yourself academically, socially, and gastronomically'.

== Notable alumni ==
- Jon Gadsby, 1972, television comedian and writer
- Michael Laws, politician, broadcaster, and writer
- Garrick Tremain, cartoonist and painter
- Paul Grant, rugby union player
- Phillipa Gray, paralympic cyclist
