= St Margaret's College, Otago =

Residential college in New Zealand

Coordinates: 45.8646°S 170.5160°E

St Margaret's College
- University of Otago Residential College
- University of Otago
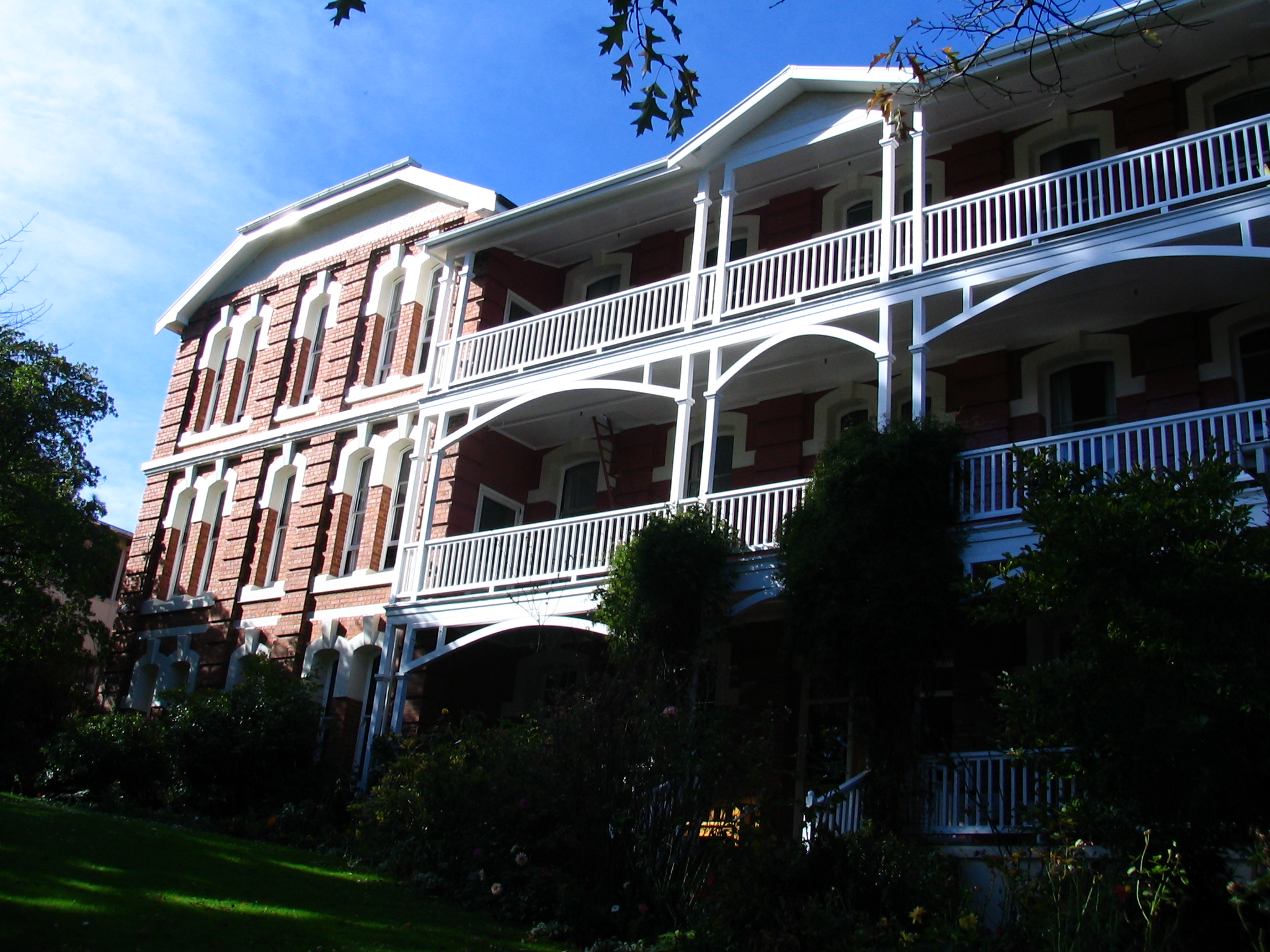
- St Margaret's College in 2009

- St Margaret's College Coat of Arms
- Location: Leith St
- Motto: Latin: Altiora in Votis (Latin)
- Motto in English: Set your heart on higher things
- Founders: Women of the Presbyterian Church
- Established: 1911
- Status: Affiliated
- Head of College: Ruben Katigbak
- Undergraduates: 224
- Postgraduates: 0
- Website: stmargarets.college

Saint Margaret's College, Otago is a residential college affiliated to the University of Otago in Dunedin, New Zealand. The current head of college is Ruben Katigbak. The previous head of college was Liz Koni, and prior to her was Dr Charles Tustin, who retired in January 2023 (previous title being Master). His predecessor, Dr Peter Norris, retired in November 2016 after 28 years of service to the college.

The college celebrated its 2011 centenary, with a college history published in 2010 and a weekend of celebrations in January, 2011.

The college currently accommodates 224 students. Its motto is "altiora in votis" or "set your heart on higher things".

== History ==
The college was founded in 1911 as the university's third college and was the first to be designated specifically as a women's college anywhere in Oceania. Otago University was the first university in New Zealand – or anywhere in the British Empire – to allow women to attend all lectures. As a result, it had a high proportion of female students. By 1909 between a quarter and a third of Otago university's students were women. However, landladies preferred male tenants, so there was a growing demand for female accommodation. In March 1910 the Women's Students' Hostel Committee, of which William Fitzgerald was the convenor, found an appropriate site. Originally located in the former Presbyterian manse in Leith Street, St Margaret's moved to its present site in 1915 following construction of the building in 1914. Though it was a Presbyterian College, it employed a ecumenical policy. New wings were added in 1946 and 1967.

St Margaret's was the first women's college in Dunedin to accept male students, which it did for the first time in 1981.

In early 2006 the college kitchen and dining hall were renovated and repainted. In early 2007, the entrance hall was renovated, with the addition of leather couches.

In summer 2007/8 a new floor was added to Clyde Wing.

In 2008 the ground floor of the main wing was refurbished with rooms getting new wallpaper and carpet and more light fittings amongst other things.

In summer 2023/24 the lower three floors of Clyde Wing received a complete renovation to match the main wing, with removal of the dated wallpaper and cabinetry, new carpet, blinds, wainscoting, and light fixtures, among other things.

== Notable residents ==
Ann Wylie (resident 1941–44)

Robin Briant (resident 1960–1962)
