= Gretchen Kivell =

New Zealand chemical engineer

- Born: Ruth Gretchen Kershaw; 1948 (age 77–78); Dunedin, New Zealand
- Education: University of Canterbury; University of Auckland
- Employer(s): Department of Scientific and Industrial Research, Unitec Institute of Technology, University of Otago
- Awards: Distinguished Fellow of Engineering New Zealand

Ruth Gretchen Kivell (née Kershaw; born 1948) is a New Zealand chemical engineer and tertiary educator, and worked in the United Kingdom and in New Zealand. She was the first woman president of Engineering New Zealand, and was elected a Distinguished Fellow in 2005.

== Early life and education ==
Kivell was born and grew up in Dunedin. She attended Arthur Street School, Bayfield High School and Queen's High School, before spending a year studying at the University of Otago. She went to study chemical engineering at the University of Canterbury, graduating in 1971 with a Bachelor of Engineering degree. Kivell was one of six women in a class of 600 students, and later described her experiences as "very difficult....almost brutalising" due to overt and unconscious discrimination.

== Career ==
Kivell worked as an engineer at Fletcher Timber, and then in the chemical engineering division of the Department of Scientific and Industrial Research. She then moved to the UK with her husband, and worked as a product engineer. Kivell returned to New Zealand in 1980, where she worked for KRTA. She completed an MBA in 1989, and worked in tertiary education at Unitech Institute of Technology and the University of Otago.

Kivell has served on the council for the Centre for Advanced Engineering and International Accreditation New Zealand, and was a director of the Worley Group Ltd. From 1999 until 2004 she was a board member of the Land Transport Safety Authority. Kivell was chair of the Auckland branch of IPENZ (now Engineering New Zealand) from 1984, and then joined the national governance board in 1988. She became the first woman president of IPENZ in 1998. She was also chair of the IPENZ Foundation in 2010.

She was later head of Toroa College and Abbey College in Dunedin. Kivell is the president of the University of the Third Age in Dunedin.

== Honours and awards ==
In 2005 Kivell was elected a Distinguished Fellow of Engineering New Zealand. In 2023 she was awarded a University of Otago Disability Information and Support Appreciation Award for "being an exceptional supervisor for alternative arrangements".
