= John Burnside (architect) =

New Zealand architect (1857–1920)

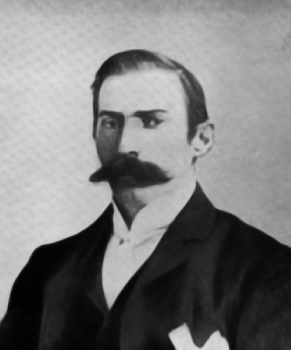
- Born: 17 December 1857; Tokomairiro, New Zealand
- Died: 7 July 1920 (aged 62); Dunedin, New Zealand
- Occupation: Architect
- Buildings: Redcastle; Transit House; Bank of New Zealand building, Lawrence; Hocken Wing of the Otago Museum

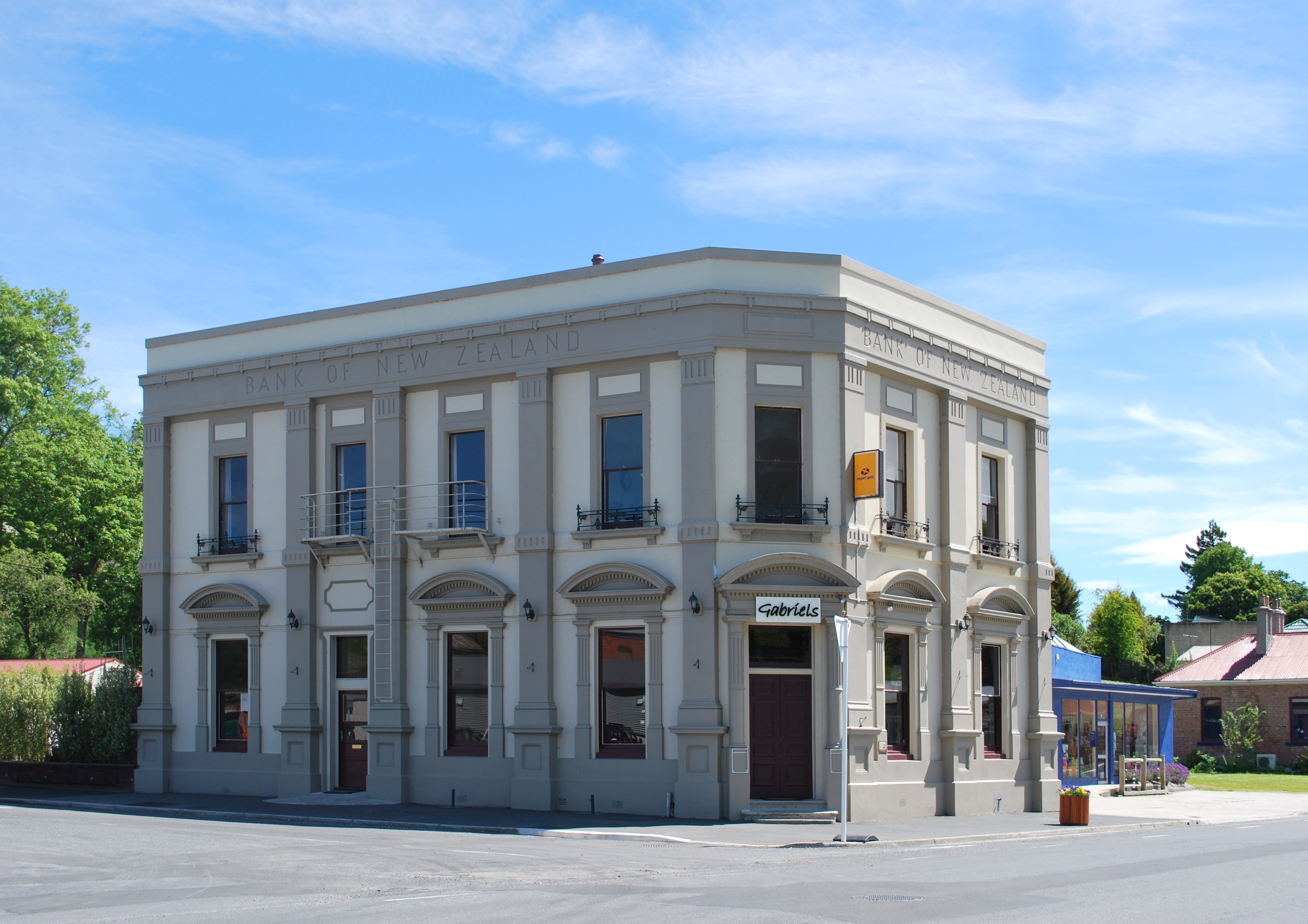
The Bank of New Zealand building in Lawrence, designed by Burnside in 1885–1886

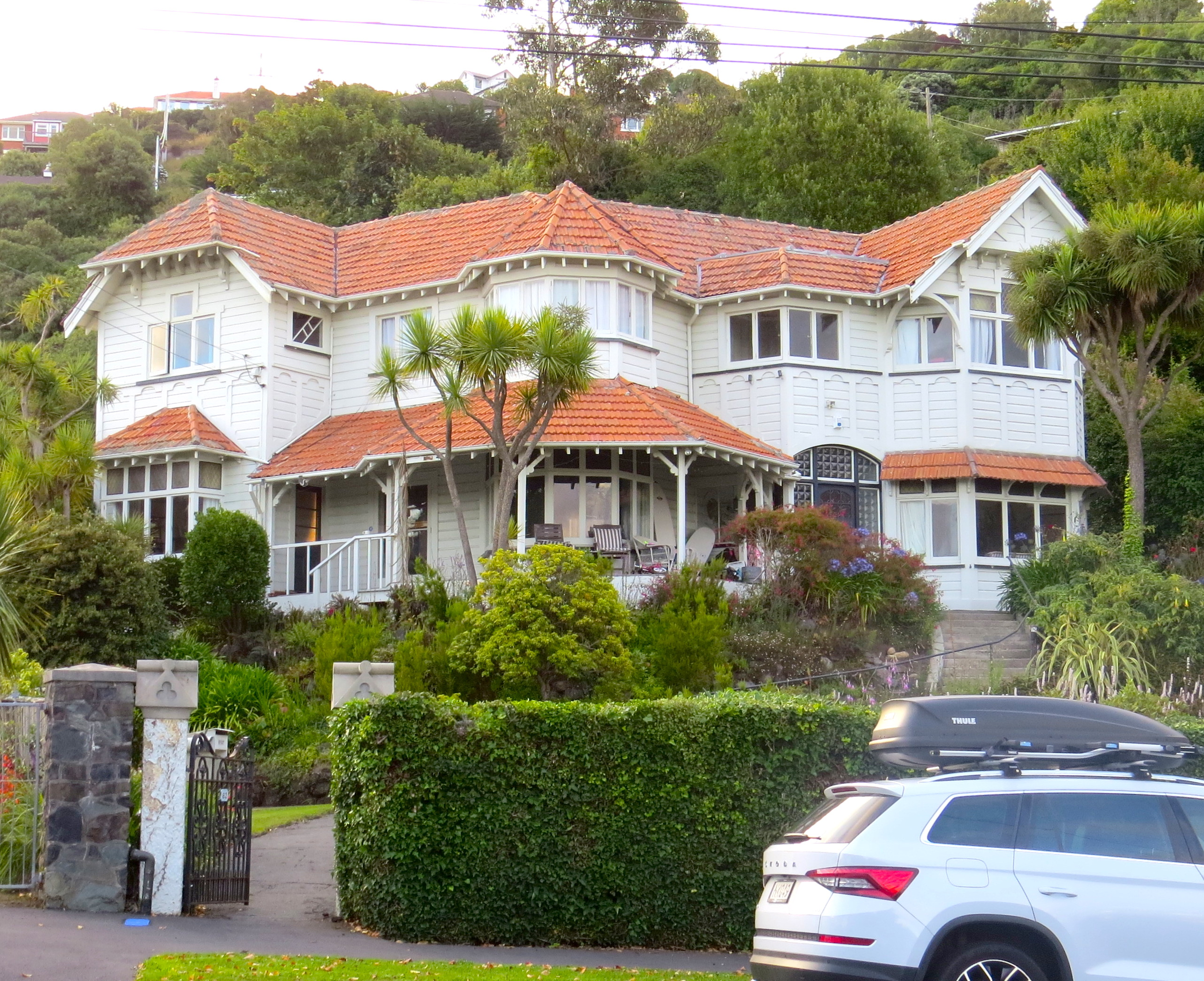
John Burnside's self-designed home in Norfolk St, St Clair

John Arthur Burnside (17 December 1857 – 7 July 1920) was a New Zealand architect, active in Dunedin for much of the 1880s to 1920s. He was the designer of a number of notable buildings in the city.

== Early life ==
John Arthur Burnside was born in Tokomairiro (now Milton) in Otago, New Zealand, on 17 December 1857. He was the only son of a Scottish emigrant, John Burnside, who had previously farmed in Canada, and his wife, Jessie (née Gillies), the sister of Robert Gillies. He was educated in Dunedin, where his father, who had been a farmer at Tokomairiro, worked in the office of the Registrar of Births, Deaths & Marriages. He also received private tuition and once his education was completed, was apprenticed to Mason & Wales, a Dunedin architectural practice. He won awards at Australian exhibitions for his architectural models while fulfilling his apprenticeship. He subsequently graduated to a role as an assistant with the practice. An early example of his work, at least in part, for Mason & Wales is Otekaieke, the home of Robert Campbell in North Otago.

== Professional practice ==
By September 1879, Burnside was practising as an architect on his own account. He had a wide-ranging practice, designing private and commercial buildings as well as ecclesiastical buildings. During the course of his professional career he was responsible for the design of around 70 buildings, mostly in Dunedin but also further afield in the South Island. One of his earliest works was Terminus Hotel on Dunedin's Rattray Street. Another of his earlier commissions was Transit House, the residence in Dunedin of his uncle, Robert Gillies, which was built in 1882. It was listed a Historic Place Category 2 by Heritage New Zealand in 1990. He designed the offices of the Bank of New Zealand in Lawrence, which was built in April 1886. Another residential commission was McKellar House, the home of Dr Thomas George McKellar, which was constructed in 1895 and is notable for its use of a turret. He also designed Redcastle, the residence in Oamaru of John McLean. Built of brick and tiles, it was completed in 1903 in an Edwardian Queen Anne style. It is now part of the campus of St Kevin's College.

An ecclesiastical commission for Burnside was St Columba's Anglican Church at Wanaka; this commenced construction in 1902 with work continuing for the next several years. He also designed the Clark Sunday School Hall, which was opened in 1905, at Palmerston's St James' Church.

Burnside was responsible for the two-storied wing of the Otago Museum that was completed in 1910 to house the Hocken Collections. This was an addition, known as the Hocken Wing, to the existing structure for which David Ross was the original architect. An unusual commission for Burnside was the design of a tomb, done in a Gothic style, at the Lawrence Cemetery for Chinese businessman Sam Chew Lain in 1903. It was heritage listed in January 2026. Other notable Burnside buildings include the 1903 Roberts Building in Moray Place, Dunedin, now largely occupied by De Novo Art Gallery, and McKellar House in Pitt Street, Dunedin (a Heritage New Zealand Category II structure).

Burnside had other professional interests separate to his architectural work, particularly in gold mining. He was the director of Golden United and of Sullivan's Land, both companies that were involved in dredging for gold.

== Later life ==
Active in Dunedin's social scene, Burnside was a member of the Horticultural Society as well as the Otago Art Society. He also served in the Volunteer Force, New Zealand's colonial militia. In his later years, Burnside was the president of the Otago branch of the New Zealand Institute of Architects. From 1909 he resided in Norfolk Street, St Clair, in a house of his own design.

Burnside died of a heart attack on 7 July 1920 while at the premises of the Perpetual Trustees Company; he had recently submitted a tender to renovate the company's building. Aged 63 at the time of his death, he was buried at Andersons Bay Cemetery. He was survived by his wife, Elizabeth (d. 1940), and four children.
