= Cumberland College, Otago =

Residential college in Dunedin, New Zealand

Coordinates: 45.869711°S 170.510237°E

Cumberland College
- University of Otago Residential College
- University of Otago
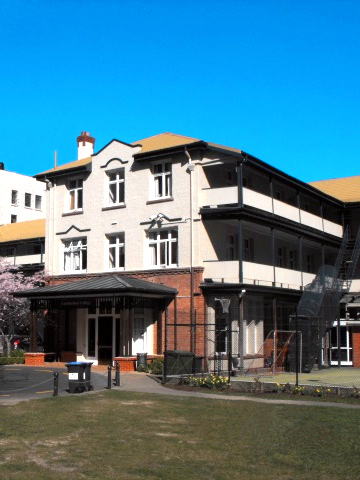

- Cumberland College Coat of Arms
- Location: 250 Castle St, Dunedin Central, Dunedin
- Nickname: Cumby
- Motto: Audaces Fortuna Iuvat (Latin)
- Motto in English: Fortune Favours the Bold
- Founder: University of Otago
- Established: 1989
- Former names: Cumberland Hall, Dunedin Hospital Nurses Home
- Warden: Luke Morrison
- Undergraduates: 320 (approx)

Cumberland College is a residential college in Dunedin, New Zealand, for the University of Otago. Cumberland College was established as a hall of residence in 1989. It is located in the former Dunedin Hospital Nurses' Home, built in 1916, across the road from Dunedin Hospital and the Queen Mary Maternity Hospital. Cumberland College is linked by tunnels to both Dunedin Hospital and Hayward College (formerly the maternity hospital). Over 7000 students have spent time living in Cumberland College since its establishment.

Cumberland has a social programme that includes floor events, inter-college competitions, regular sports events, ski trips, and the annual ball. Cumberland also provides tutorials in a number of university subjects for its residents, along with floor based Study Groups that have additional tutorial support. Cumberland is one of the few Residential Colleges to allocate bedrooms by course of study as part of its academic program.

The current Warden at Cumberland College is Luke Morrison, alongside Deputy Wardens, Brian Satake & Jenna Lockhart, and Assistant Warden Zoey Taylor.

== Construction ==
Cumberland College is made up of the main Cumberland College building that houses 328 students. Until 2015 Cumberland College also included Cumberland Courts which was made up of flatting units situated 5 minute's walk away from the college that housed 102 students. The main Cumberland College building was built as the Dunedin Hospital Nurses Home in 1916. The building has been extensively renovated since its purchase by the University of Otago in 1989.

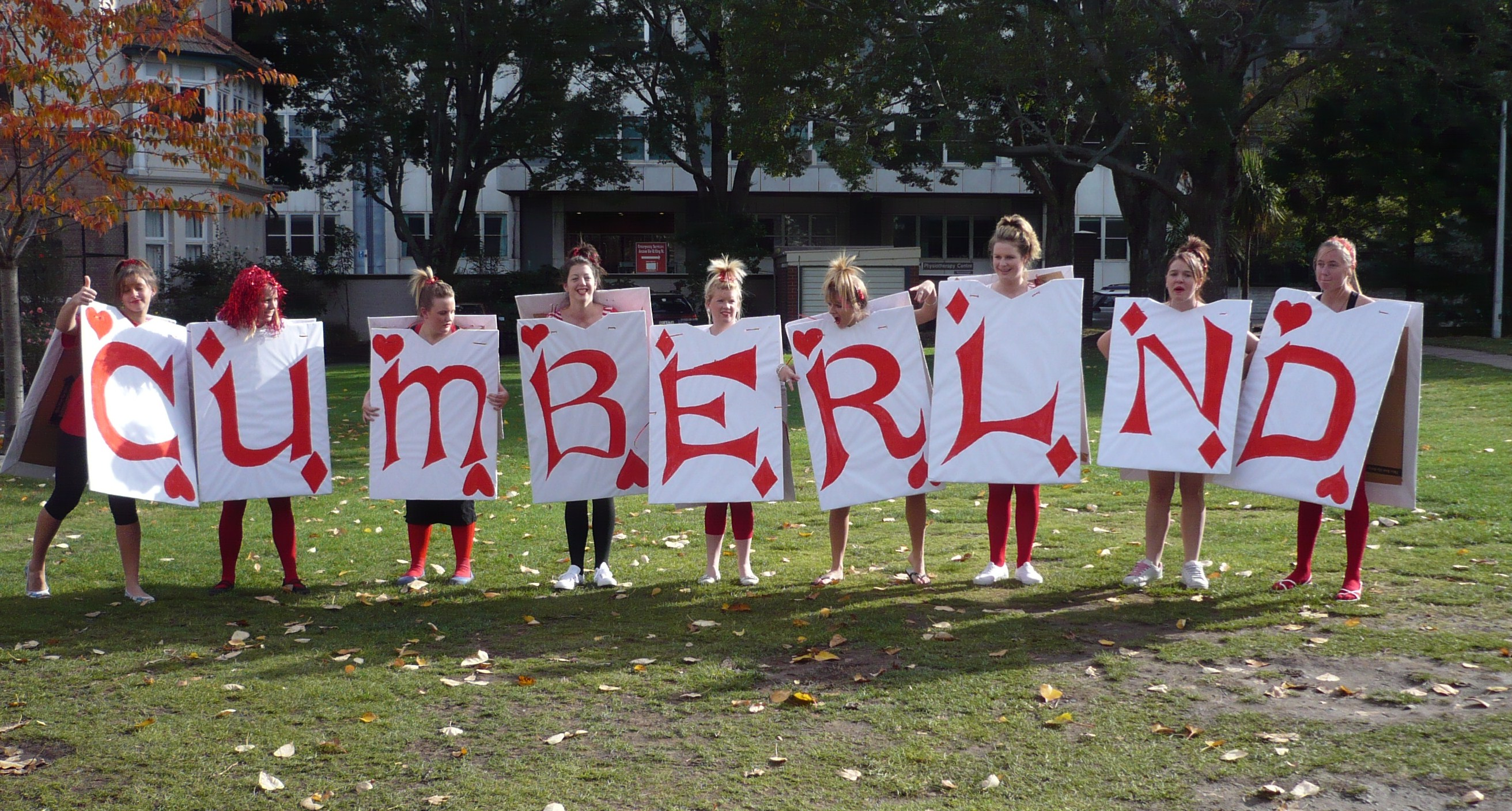
Cumberland residents who led Cumberland to Second place in the OUSA Capping Parade Competition in 2008

== Claimed hauntings ==
The college is reputed to be haunted by a spirit known as "the Grey Lady", the apparition possibly dating from the college's time as a nurse's hostel.

== Coat of arms ==
Coat of arms of Cumberland College
| Notes The Arms of Cumberland College were matriculated by the Lord Lyon on 1 March 2001. Escutcheon Azure, on a saltire cantoned between four mullets of six points or a book gilt-edged and bound in a cover Gules charged with a mullet of six points of the second and a book marker of the Third issuant from the page Foot all within a bordure quarterly Gules and Or Motto Audentes Fortuna iuvat ("Fortune favours the bold") |
