= University College, Otago =

Residential college in Dunedin, New Zealand

Coordinates: 45.8655°S 170.5159°E

University College
- University of Otago Residential College
- University of Otago
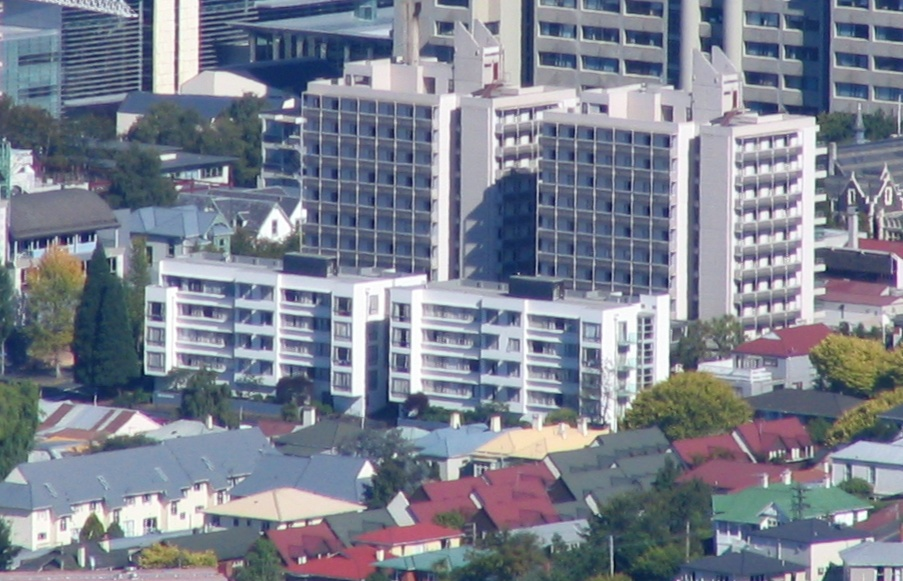
- University College, South Tower and North Tower behind South Annexe and North Annexe, north to the right

- University College Coat of Arms
- Location: 315 Leith St
- Nickname: UniCol
- Motto: Ut Magis Aptil Reddamur (Latin)
- Motto in English: That we may be made more fit
- Founder: University of Otago
- Established: 1969
- Warden: Pauline Donovan
- Undergraduates: 518
- Website: www.otago.ac.nz/unicol

University College (UniCol), founded in 1969, is the largest residential hall at the University of Otago in Dunedin, New Zealand. It houses approximately 501 residents during the academic year. Originally consisting of two towers, North Tower and South Tower, it has since been expanded with the acquisition of a set of flats on Clyde street and then in 2004 with the Northern and Southern Annexes. It is the most central college on the campus, situated beside the university's original buildings. The college is home to a variety of University of Otago students from all over the world. These students pursue a myriad of different degrees.

Te Whare Raiona (House of the Lion), so named to incorporate the ornate brass lions that feature prominently at the front of the building. It has since been incorporated into the college's official logo, merchandise and flags.

== History ==
Historically, University College's South Tower housed males while the North Tower housed females. However, both towers today are unisex, with students sharing all facilities including bathrooms and showers. Highlights throughout the year include orientation week, formal dinners, ski trips, the ball, floor missions.

In early October 2019, a fire in the South Tower and the resulting water damage from the sprinkler system led to the evacuation of 60 Otago University students, who had to sleep with friends or at the university library. Due to water damage, the second, first, ground, and lower-ground floors had been evacuated.

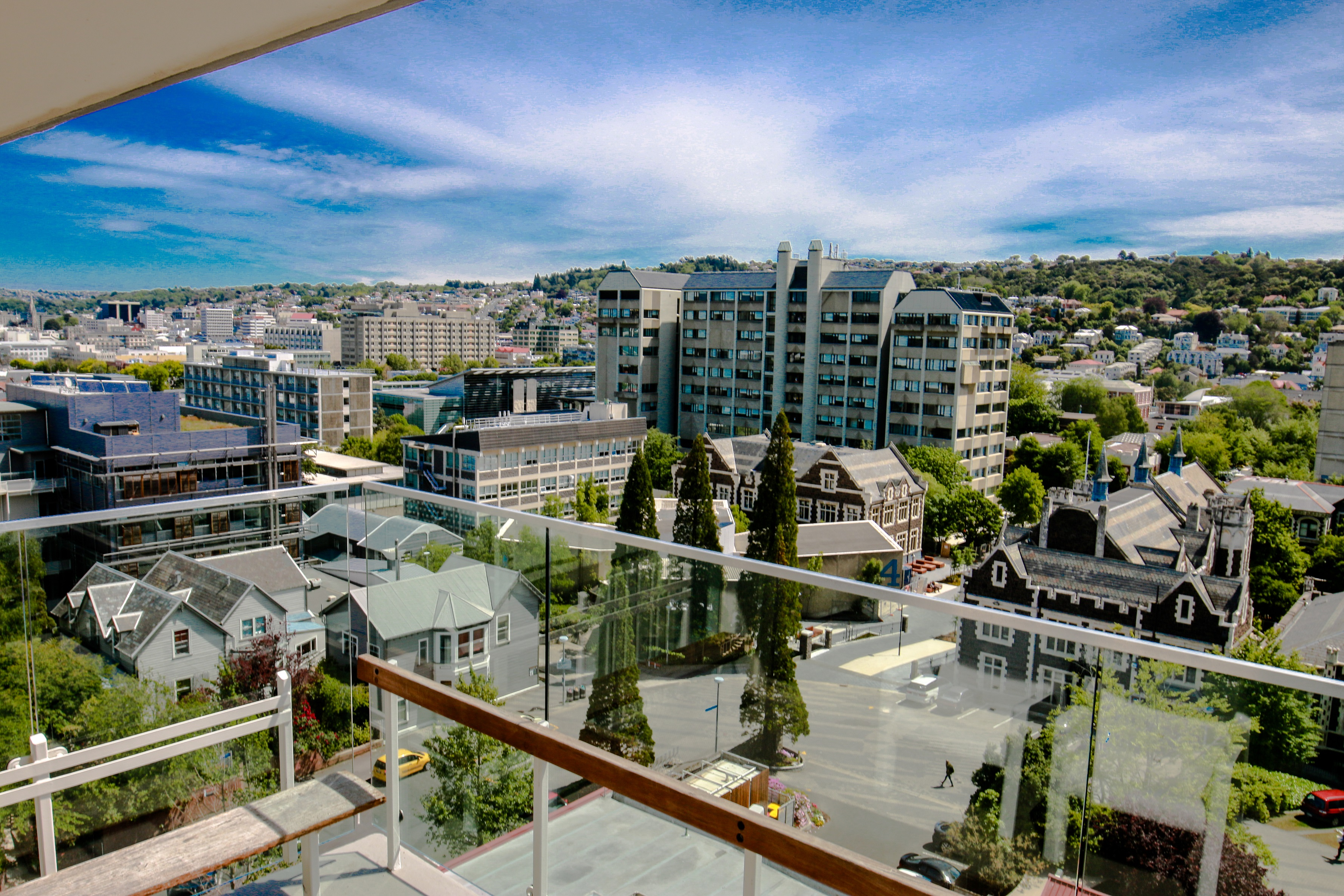
Looking out over Dunedin proper, University College is one of the tallest buildings in the city.

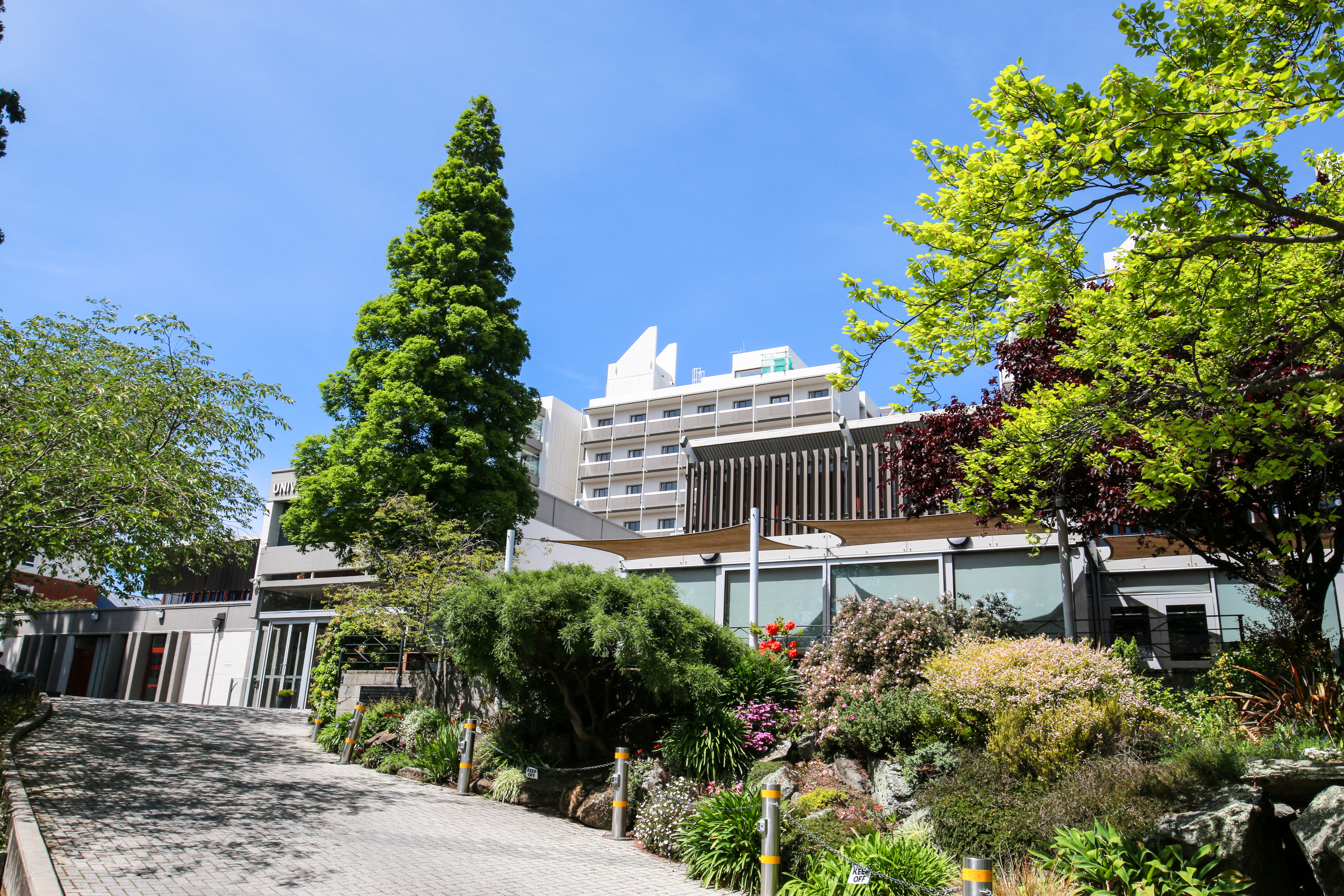
Looking out over Dunedin proper, University College is one of the tallest buildings in the city.

== Wardens ==
- D. F. Symon, 1969–1985
- P. I. C. Rennie, 1986–1992
- C. P. M. Geary, 1993–1996
- Ashley Day, 1997–2007
- Chris Addington, 2007–2018
- Andy Walne, 2019–2021
- Pauline Donovan, 2022–Present

== Notable Past Residents ==
Name	Entered	Notability	Reference
Marc Ellis		Sport: rugby union and rugby league player	
Anton Oliver		Sport: rugby union player	
Justin Lester (politician)		Politics: Mayor of Wellington	

A seminar room is dedicated to former resident Mark Parker, who died in the 2002 Bali bombings.
