= Aquinas College, Otago =

Residential college in New Zealand

Coordinates: 45.850613°S 170.51727°E

Aquinas College
- University of Otago Residential College
- University of Otago
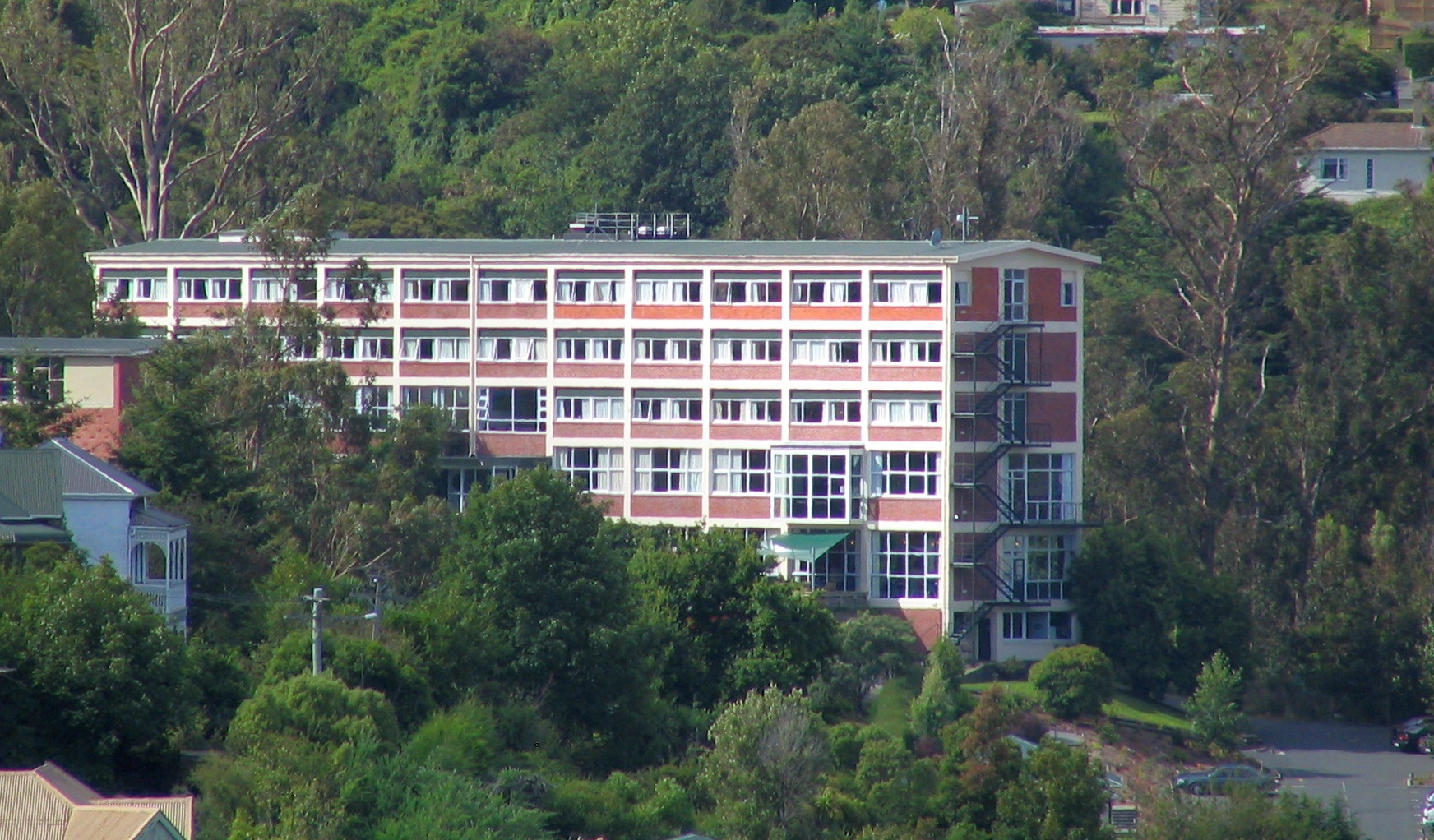
- Aquinas College in 2009

- Aquinas College Coat of Arms
- Location: Gladstone Rd
- Motto: Discendo Sapientia (Latin)
- Motto in English: Learning and Wisdom go hand in hand
- Founder: Dominican Order
- Established: 1954
- Warden: Rosemary Tarbotton
- Undergraduates: 158
- Website: otago.ac.nz/aquinas

Aquinas College is one of the Residential Colleges of the University of Otago, named after St. Thomas Aquinas, located in the suburb of Dalmore. Formerly a Roman Catholic institution in the care of the Dominican Order from the 1950s, between the early 1980s and 1988, the college was owned by the Elim Pentecostal Church, where it was used primarily by parishioners, but also by backpackers and students. The college was bought by the university in 1988 and was run for a time under the name Dalmore House, with the original name later restored.

Aquinas College maintains much of the 1950s architecture, but recently there have been major facility upgrades. The college currently houses 152 university students, making it one of the smaller University of Otago residential colleges. Notable among its facilities is its gymnasium, being the only college to have an indoor basketball court.

Aquinas was originally an all-male facility, with nearby Dominican Hall serving as a sister college for female students.

== Notable residents ==
Name	Entered	Notability	Reference
Anand Satyanand	1964	Politics: Governor-General of New Zealand	
Josh Kronfeld	1990	Sport (rugby): Former All Black	
Professor Murray Brennan, MD, FACS	1960	Medicine: Internationally renowned Surgeon	
Jack Bauer (cyclist)	2003	Sport (Cycling): Represented New Zealand at the Olympic Games and won a silver medal in the Men's Road race at the 2014 Commonwealth Games.	
