= Transit House =

Hostel in Dunedin, New Zealand

Coordinates: 45°51′47″S 170°30′24″E

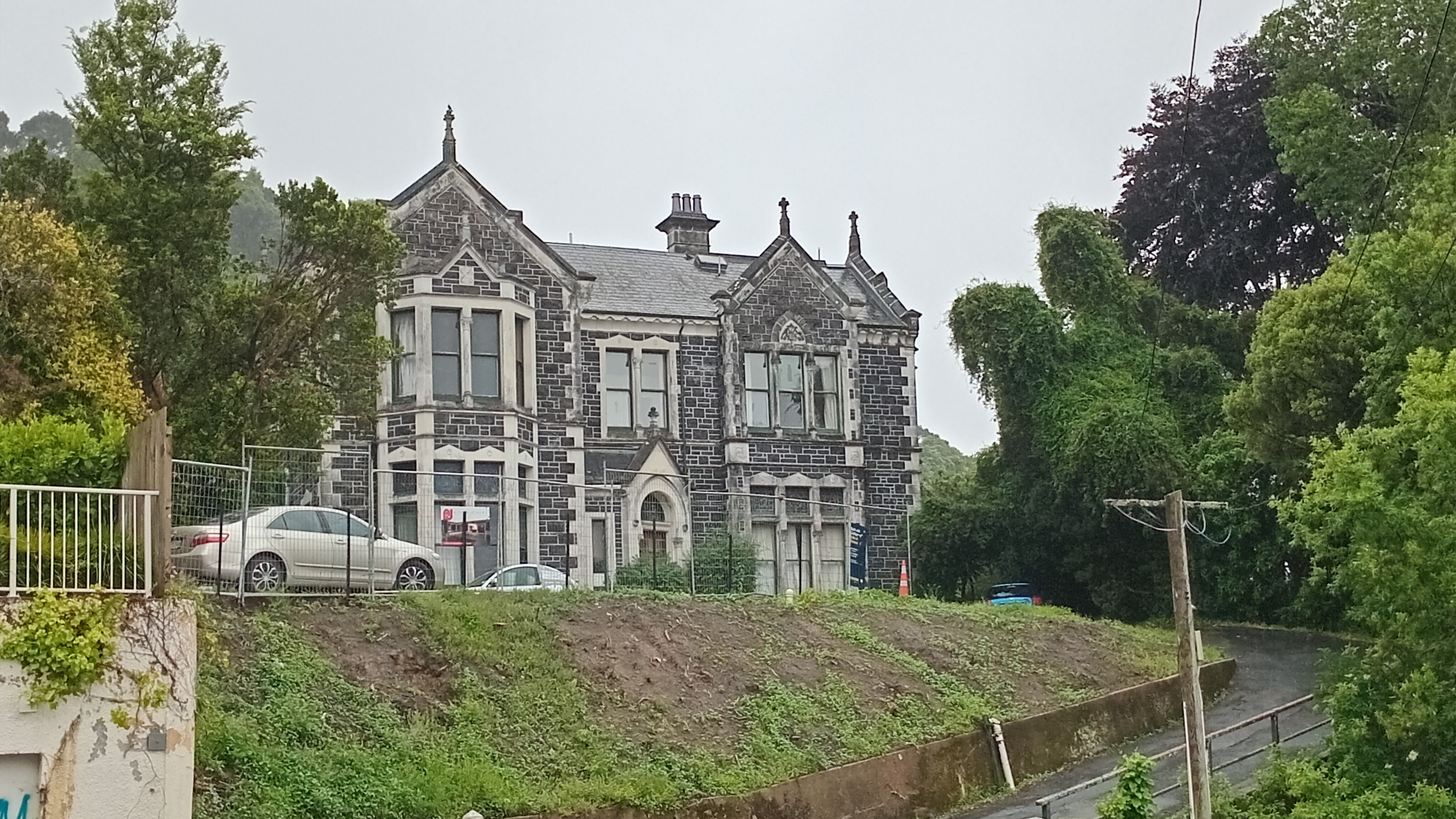
South elevation of Transit House, viewed from Park St in 2025

Transit House is a historic house in North Dunedin, registered as a heritage building.

From 1946 to 1978, as Dominican Hall, the building was a women's student hostel operated by nuns and friars of the Dominican Order as a sister college to nearby Aquinas College and as one of the residential colleges of the University of Otago.

The building was designed by John Burnside built in the 1880s for politician Robert Gillies, who, as an amateur astronomer, included an observatory in the roof and named the building Transit House in honour of the Transit of Venus.

The hall opened with 20 students in 1946. The Dominicans had the building expanded between 1948 and 1953 to accommodate 48 students. From the 1960s the garage was used by the Otago Vintage Car Club.

Dominican Hall closed in 1978. The house was sold by the Dominicans in 1982 and became a private residence.

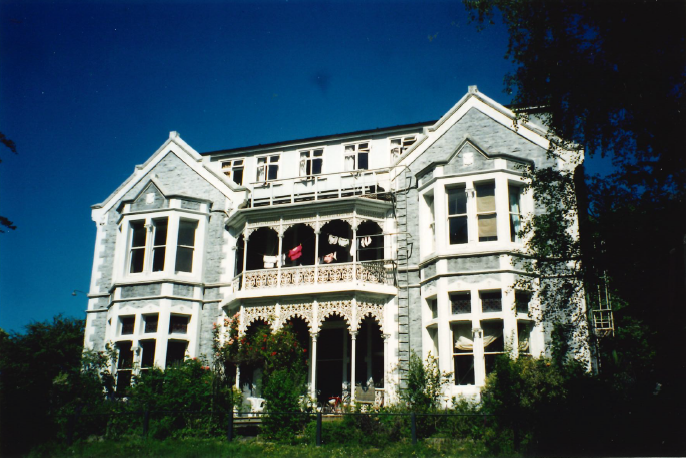
East elevation of Transit House, formerly Dominican Hall, pictured at the time of its heritage listing in the 1990s.

In 1990 Transit House was registered as "category 2" by Heritage New Zealand Pouhere Taonga.

== Notable alumnae of Dominican Hall ==
- Eti Laufiso, educationalist and language-teaching specialist
- Natalia Zotov, cosmologist
