= Carrington College, Otago =

Residential college at the University of Otago

Coordinates: 45.864562°S 170.506482°E

Carrington College
- University of Otago
- Carrington College Coat of Arms
- Location: Heriot Row
- Motto: Neque sapientiae neque fidei immemores (Latin)
- Motto in English: Unmindful neither of wisdom nor of faith
- Founder: Stuart Residence Halls Council
- Established: 1945
- Warden: Ali Norton
- Undergraduates: 243
- Website: otago.ac.nz/carrington

Carrington College is a residential college of the University of Otago. This complex of buildings has accommodation for 243 students and was opened in 1945. It was the first university hall of residence in Australasia to accept both male and female students. It is named for G.W. Carrington, a former head of the Otago Education Board. The current Warden is Ali Norton.

The College was known as Carrington Hall until 2006. The students at Carrington have a history of academic achievement across all fields of study, and there is a prevalent musical tradition within the College. Traditionally, Carrington has been known for its 'work hard, play hard' mentality, with students encouraged to make the most of every academic, social, sporting and cultural opportunity available to them.

== Houses and Buildings ==
The College consists of a number of houses, with a wide range of style and atmosphere. The houses are:

- Jenkins House, consisting of four floors and housing 84 residents.
- Stuart House, consisting of three floors and housing 36 residents.
- Pine House, a two-storey villa-style house.
- Tiro Moana House (situated across Queen St), a two-storey villa-style house with views straight down to the University.
- Blackie House, a two-storey villa-style house.
- Blackie Flat, a five-bedroom flat.
- Mahuru House, a two-storey villa-style house.
- Mahuru Flat, a five-bedroom flat.
- Mahuru Annexe, a three-bedroom flat located below the Deputy Warden's house.
- Linton House, a two-storey villa-style house which houses residents, social spaces and the College's administrative functions, including Reception and offices of the Warden, Deputy Warden and Assistant Warden.
- Wardell House, a three-storey villa-style house.
- Dawson House, located highest on the hill, is situated across Heriot Row and consists of three floors.

Carrington is also home to a tennis court, gym, dining room, art room, music room, study centre, formal lounge, and additional study rooms (located above the dining room).

== Notable alumni ==
Name	Entered	Notability	Reference
Adine Wilson (née Harper)		Sport: Captain of the Silver Ferns and Southern Steel/Sting	
Janet Frame		Literature: author and winner of a number of literary prizes	
David Cunliffe		Politics: Labour MP, Former Minister of Health	
Ralph Hotere		Art: Artist	
Melissa Katherine		Media: Comedian	

== Sources ==
- Herd, J. & Griffiths, G.J. (1980). Discovering Dunedin. Dunedin: John McIndoe. ISBN 0-86868-030-3.
