= Harald Schwefel =

German physicist in New Zealand

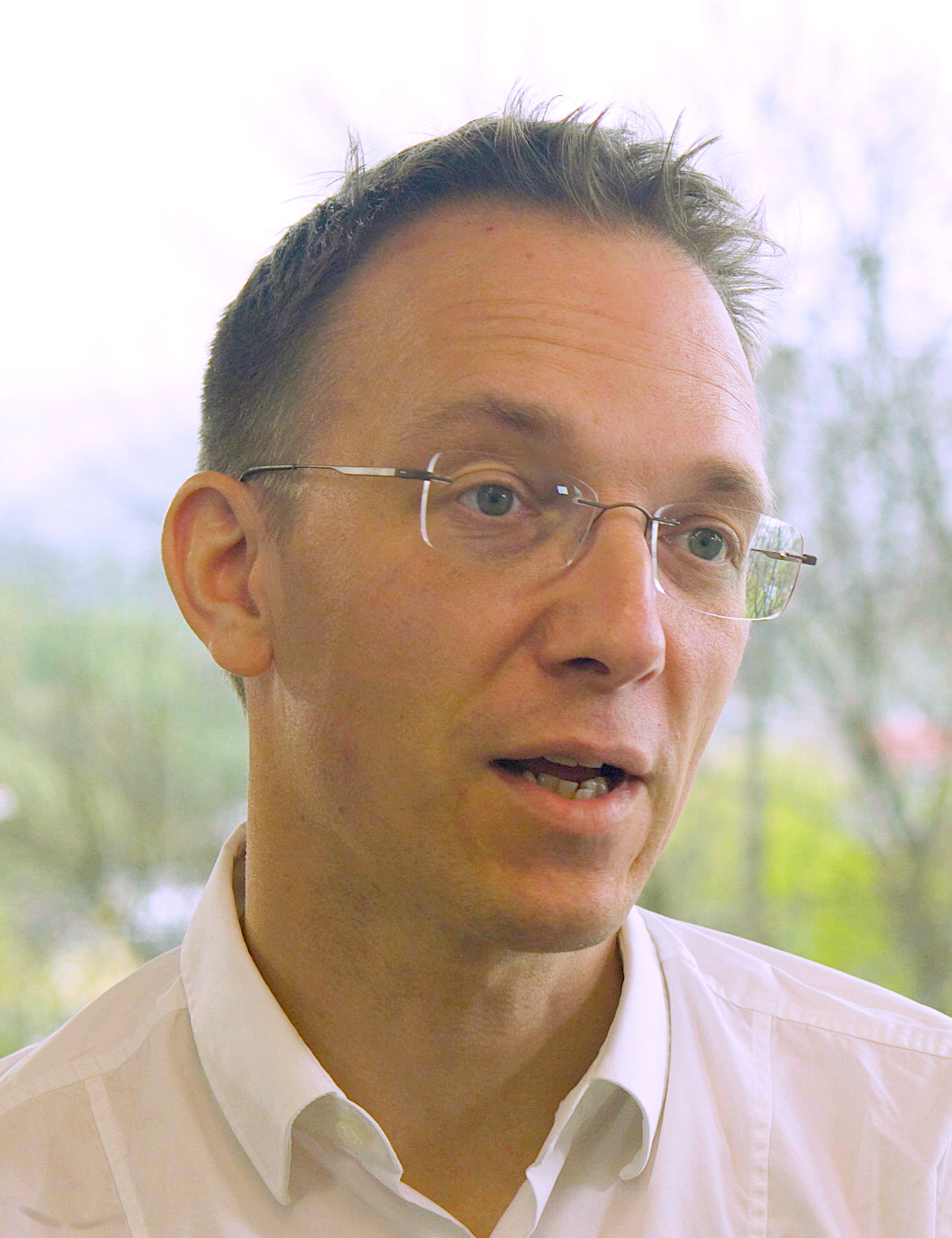
- Harald Schwefel in November 2018
- Education: Brandenburg University of Technology, Yale University
- Scientific career
- Workplaces: Yale University, University of Erlangen–Nuremberg, University of Otago, Dodd-Walls Centre
- Doctoral advisor: Douglas Stone

Harald Schwefel is a German-born physicist currently based in New Zealand. He is a professor in the Department of Physics at the University of Otago and a principal investigator in the Dodd-Walls Centre. His research focuses on the interaction of light and matter in dielectric materials, and his speciality is whispering gallery mode resonators (WGMRs), small disks of dielectric which confine and store laser light to facilitate nonlinear interactions. He uses these to generate optical frequency combs and to coherently convert between microwave and optical photons.

== Biography ==
Born in Berlin, Schwefel spent his undergraduate years from 1994 till 1998 studying physics and maths at Brandenburg University of Technology (BTU) Cottbus in Germany. During this time he took an active part in student politics as a member and then chairman of the student council StuRa. He organised strikes and demonstrations in response to savings plans proposed by Science Minister Steffen Reiche in a draft of the Brandenburg Higher Education Act that granted unlimited rights to close and merge universities. Schwefel was motivated to maintain the small size of universities in East Germany which offered educational advantages. He encouraged students to be active, enjoy student life and study subjects they found fun. He also ran the Berlin marathon and climbed Mount Elbrus while at BTU.

In 1998 Schwefel received a graduate student scholarship from Yale University and studied the topic of chaotic dielectric resonators at Yale University with adviser Douglas Stone. During this time he worked as a maths and science tutor at Davenport College. He graduated with a PhD in 2004 and took a postdoctoral position in the same department, spending seven years in total at the Yale Physics Department. In 2005 he visited ATR Wave Engineering Laboratories in Kyoto Japan as a postdoctoral researcher.

In 2005 Schwefel joined the Max Planck Research Group at the University of Erlangen as a postdoctoral fellow and then established a research programme as a group leader at the Max Planck Institute for the Science of Light in Erlangen.

Schwefel moved to New Zealand in September 2015 where he has reestablished his research programme as a senior lecturer in the Department of Physics at the University of Otago and a principal investigator in the Dodd-Walls Centre for Photonic and Quantum Technologies.

== Research ==
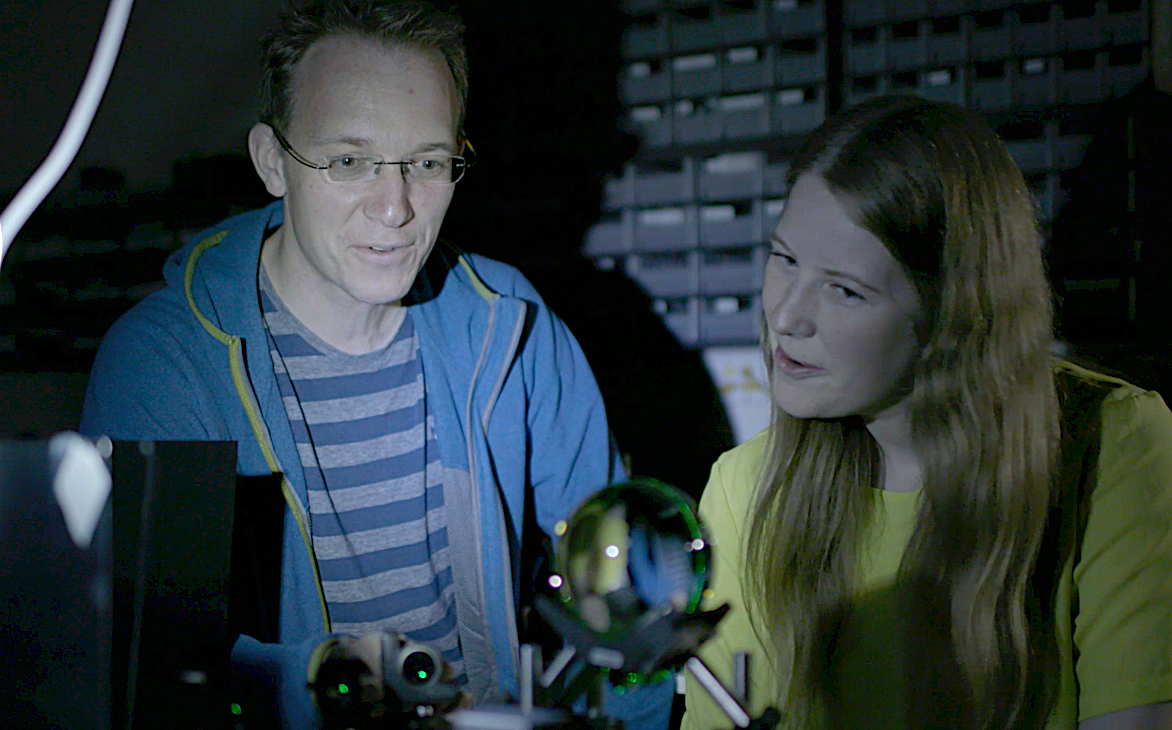
Schwefel and PhD student Bianca Sawyer

Schwefel leads the Resonant Optics group at the University of Otago. His research focuses on resonantly enhanced interaction of light and matter in dielectric materials. This includes both theoretical and experimental work in the linear and nonlinear domains. He specialises in whispering gallery mode resonators (WGMRs), small disks of dielectric materials which are used to confine, store and therefore intensify light to facilitate nonlinear interactions. These devices are based on the whispering gallery wave phenomenon, where laser light bounces around the inner surface of a dielectric disc, confined by total internal reflection. Schwefel began research on WGMRs at the Max Planck Institute and has further developed fabrication techniques to achieve high quality factors, which means that large amounts of laser light can be confined and stored within the resonator with very little leakage. The resulting high electric field strengths enable efficient nonlinear interactions. Schwefel's group are exploring the use of WGMRs for generating optical frequency combs, coherently converting microwave and terahertz radiation into the optical domain as well as other fundamental investigations.

=== Optical frequency combs and telecommunication ===
Schwefel and his team have used WGMRs made of second order nonlinear crystals, such as lithium niobate, to generate optical frequency combs of record efficiency. These devices show potential to significantly improve the efficiency of the internet by reducing the power required to encode data and the information-carrying capacity of optical fibres. The frequency combs are generated by sending low power microwave and optical signals into a WGMR; the crystal is electro-optically active, so its optical properties change under the influence of an electric field. The electric field of the microwaves influences the light waves and as a result a cascade of over a hundred new optical frequencies are generated from the original optical frequency. The device produces 160 coherent laser frequencies at low power. They have potential use in submarine optical networks and data centres where a single optical frequency comb could replace over a hundred lasers currently used to encode and send data on optical fibres. Because all the laser lines generated are from the same source, they have the same noise characteristics and stable phase relation. This would allow the transport of more light down a single optical fibre, increasing its information-carrying capacity. Unlike the more common microresonator optical frequency combs, which are based on the third-order nonlinear Kerr effect, these optical frequency combs rely on a second-order nonlinear effect, which has enabled improvements in efficiency. Schwefel and his team are collaborating with New Zealand-based optical technology company Coherent Solutions to develop applications and are also investigating the use of their frequency combs for high-precision spectroscopy.

The WGMRs also show potential for reducing the line-width of fibre lasers. Schwefel and his team have found that placing a WGMR as a passive filtering element within the loop of a fibre laser reduces the line width to sub-kHz levels, which improves the stability of the system.

=== Quantum computing and communication ===
Schwefel's team have used their WGMRs to coherently convert microwave photons into optical photons. This offers a method for coherent optical telecommunication between individual quantum computers. Some superconducting quantum computers use microwave photons as the qubits for quantum information processing. As microwave photons are lost outside the ultra-cold environment of a cryostat, they cannot be used to communicate through ambient temperatures between quantum computers. Converting microwave signals into the optical domain and vice versa enables the use of conventional optical telecommunications networks for communication. Schwefel and his team have achieved coherent conversion by sending microwave photons into their WGMRs along with an optical signal. The two signals interact producing a third optical output signal that is coherent with the original microwave signal.

They are working with researchers at the Max Planck Institute for the Science of Light to study the quantum properties of light that has been converted from optical to microwave light in a lithium niobate WGMR.

In 2017 Schwefel won the Bright Ideas Competition, sponsored by the Optical Society of America Foundation and the international laser manufacturer Quantel Laser. He won the competition for his proposal to generate photon triplets, a new quantum optical state of light with applications in quantum optics and secure communications. The prize was $30,000 (US) worth of laser equipment, which he proposed to use to generate the photon triplets.

=== Archeology collaboration ===
Along with other researchers and students at the Dodd-Walls Centre, Schwefel has been working with American archeologist Leslie Van Gelder to develop an LED lamp that mimics the flickering torch light that palaeolithic cave artists worked by many thousands of years ago. The lamps will enable cave art to be seen in a more authentic light and help archaeologists answer questions about palaeolithic people and their techniques for creating cave art.

== Awards and honours ==
- Winner of 2017 Bright Ideas Competition sponsored by the Optical Society of America Foundation and Quantel Laser.
- Elected as an Optica Fellow in 2023.
