= Miro Erkintalo =

New Zealand physicist

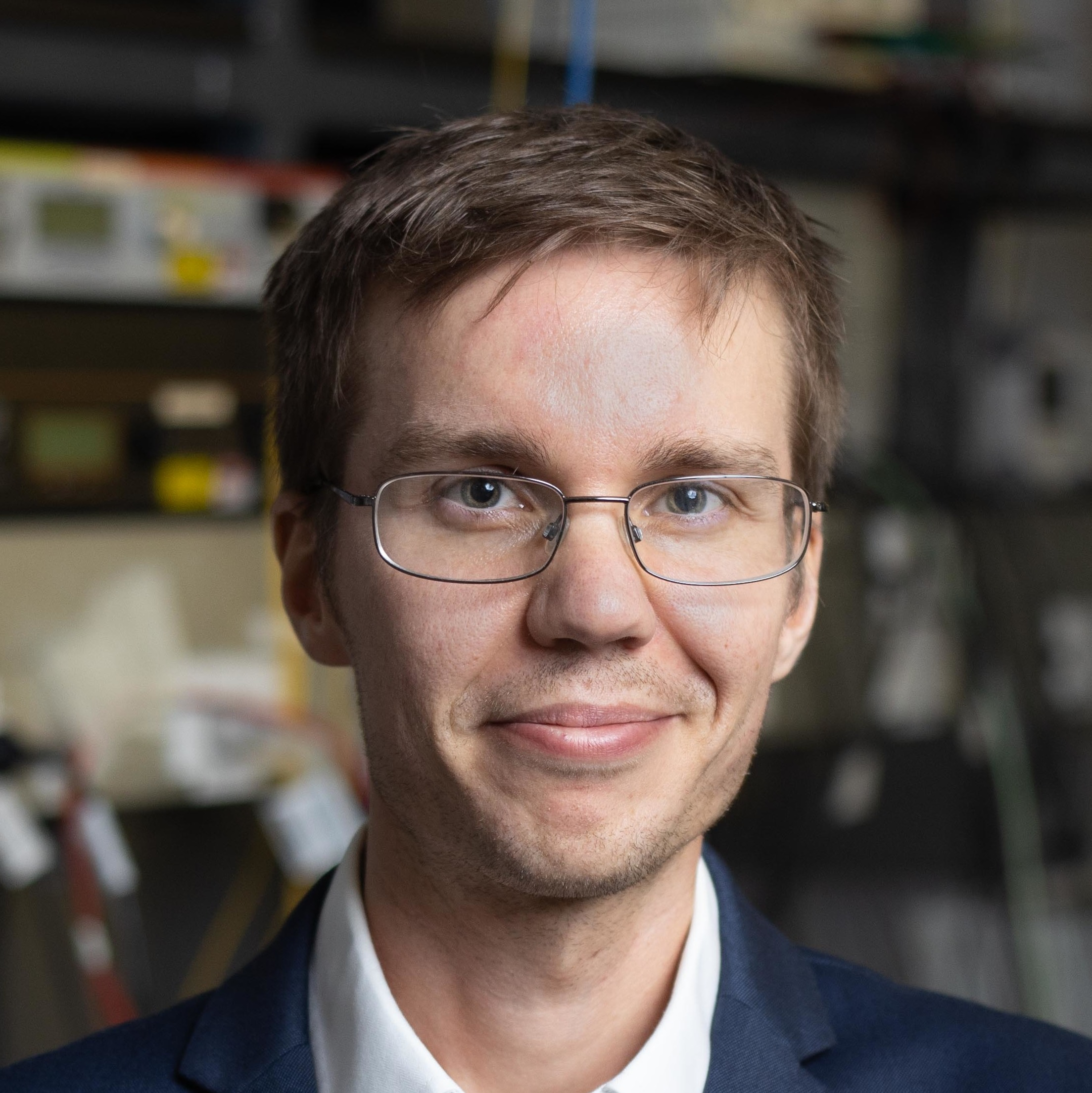
- Born: Pori, Finland
- Education: Tampere University of Technology (BSc, MSc, DSc)
- Scientific career
- Fields: Nonlinear optics Laser physics
- Workplaces: University of Auckland; Dodd-Walls Centre

Miro Erkintalo is a New Zealand physicist specialising in nonlinear optics and laser physics, and head of the Department of Physics at the University of Auckland.

== Education ==
Erkintalo was born and grew up in Pori, Finland, with an interest in science and maths. He attended the Tampere University of Technology intending to get his MSc and become a teacher or technologist, but after interning in a research lab decided to become a physicist. He completed three degrees in succession: a BSc (March 2009), an MSc (November 2009) and Doctor of Science in Physics (January 2012).

After his PhD, Erkintalo came to New Zealand in 2012 to take up a postdoctoral fellowship at the University of Auckland, at the suggestion of his mentor John Dudley. He had intended to just stay for two years, but enjoyed New Zealand so much he became a permanent resident. He became a Lecturer in the Department of Physics in 2014, Senior Lecturer in February 2017 and Associate Professor in February 2021. He is a principal investigator at the Dodd-Walls Centre for Photonic and Quantum Technologies.

== Areas of research ==
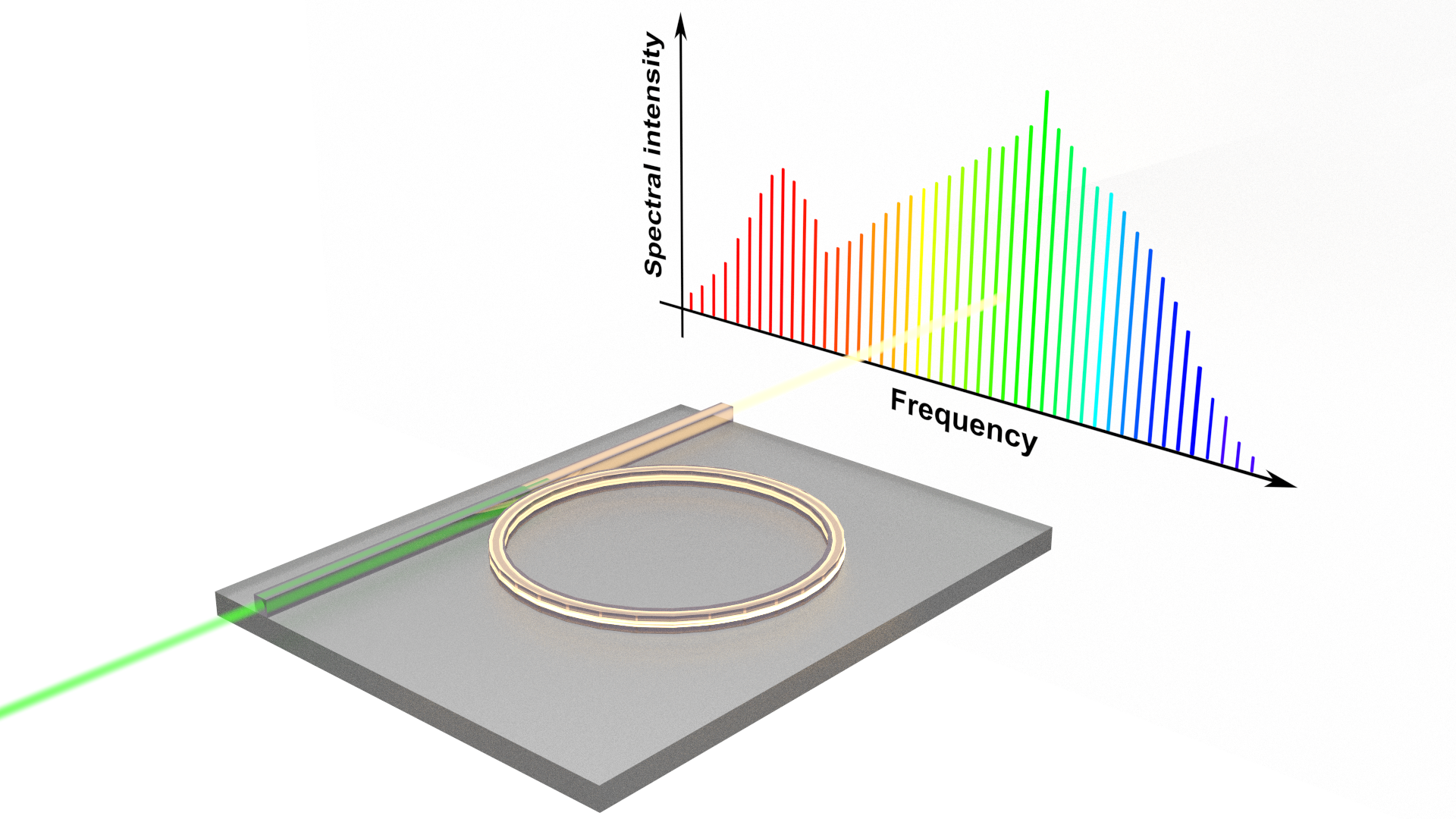
Schematic depiction by Erkintalo of the generation of an optical frequency comb in a ring resonator

Erkintalo studies laser light and how it interacts with matter, both fundamental physics and technological applications. He developed the theoretical model for microresonator frequency combs, which can convert a single laser beam into hundreds or thousands of different-coloured beams. Currently fibre-optic communications systems use hundreds of lasers with different wavelengths to increase the amount of information transmitted; a microresonator frequency comb could allow a single beam to do this work, greatly improving performance and energy efficiency. His work on temporal cavity solitons has potential for the development of light-based computer memory.

Erkintalo has also been part of the development of inexpensive ultrashort pulsed lasers with potential applications in microscopy and micro-machining. These lasers have extremely short pulses of hundreds of femtoseconds, which have very high peak energy and can be used in environments where they would have to work under extreme noise, temperature, and vibration.

== Honours and awards ==
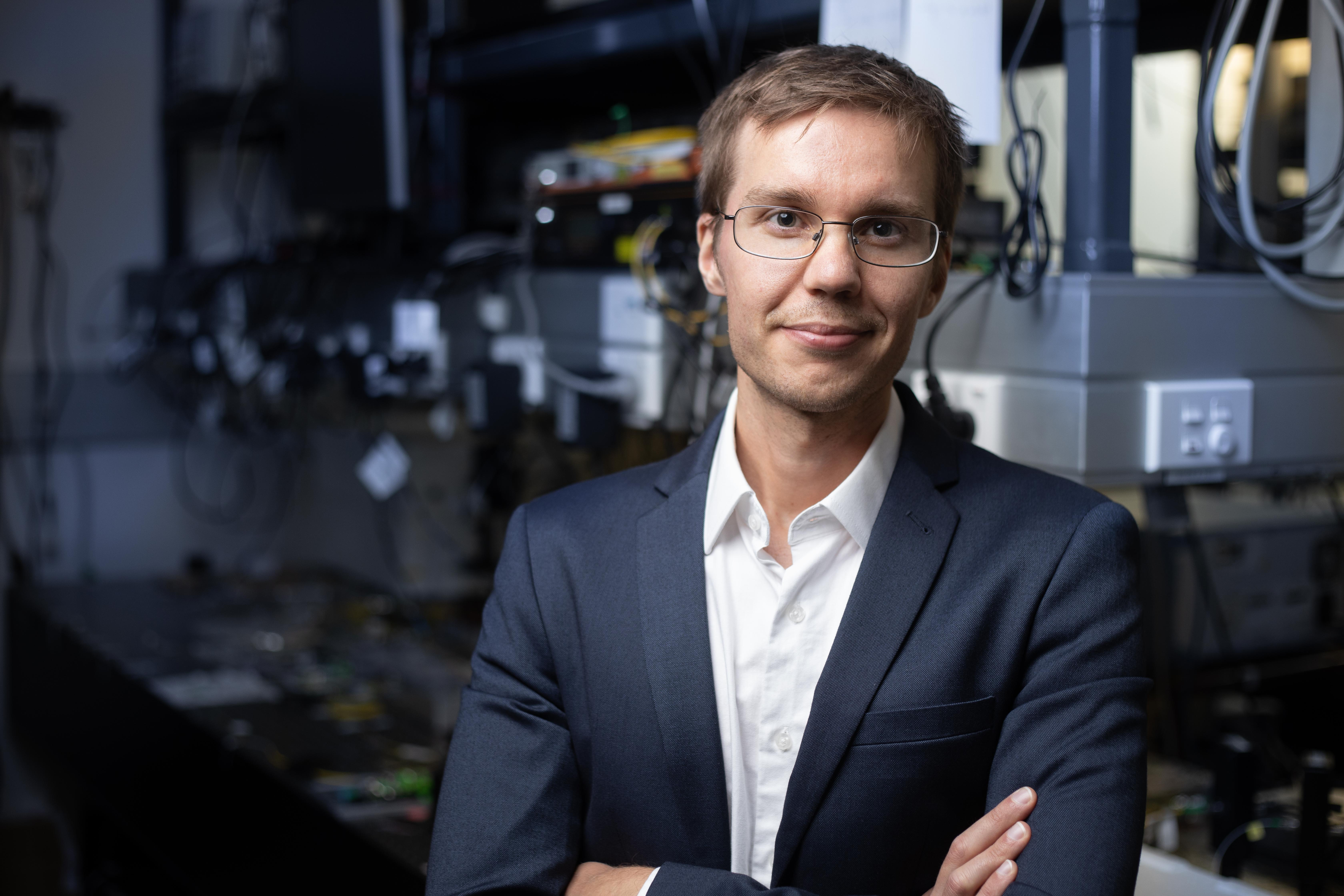
Miro Erkintalo in his lab at the University of Auckland, after winning the Prime Minister's MacDiarmid Emerging Scientist Prize

Erkintalo was awarded a Rutherford Discovery Fellowship in 2015 and two Marsden Fund grants. He won the Hamilton Award, the Royal Society Te Apārangi's Early Career Research Excellence Award for Science, in 2016 for his work in nonlinear optics and laser physics.

On 30 June 2020 Erkintalo was presented with the 2019 Prime Minister's MacDiarmid Emerging Scientist Prize for his contributions to new laser technologies. Most of the $200,000 prize will go towards exploring microresonator frequency comb architecture.

== Selected publications ==
- Coen, Stéphane; Erkintalo, Miro (2013). "Universal scaling laws of Kerr frequency combs". Optics Letters. 38 (11): 1790–1792. arXiv:1303.7078. Bibcode:2013OptL...38.1790C. doi:10.1364/OL.38.001790. PMID 23722745. S2CID 2590926.
- Dudley, John M.; Dias, Frédéric; Erkintalo, Miro; Genty, Goëry (2014). "Instabilities, breathers and rogue waves in optics". Nature Photonics. 8 (10): 755–764. arXiv:1410.3071. Bibcode:2014NaPho...8..755D. doi:10.1038/nphoton.2014.220. S2CID 53349599.
- Pasquazi, Alessia; Peccianti, Marco; Razzari, Luca; Moss, David J.; Coen, Stéphane; Erkintalo, Miro; Chembo, Yanne K.; Hansson, Tobias; Wabnitz, Stefan; Del'Haye, Pascal; Xue, Xiaoxiao (2018). "Micro-combs: A novel generation of optical sources". Physics Reports. Micro-combs: A novel generation of optical sources. 729: 1–81. Bibcode:2018PhR...729....1P. doi:10.1016/j.physrep.2017.08.004. hdl:1959.3/434768.
- Nielsen, Alexander U.; Garbin, Bruno; Coen, Stéphane; Murdoch, Stuart G.; Erkintalo, Miro (2019). "Coexistence and Interactions between Nonlinear States with Different Polarizations in a Monochromatically Driven Passive Kerr Resonator". Physical Review Letters. 123 (1) 013902. arXiv:1902.05541. Bibcode:2019PhRvL.123a3902N. doi:10.1103/PhysRevLett.123.013902. PMID 31386416. S2CID 118943790.
- Ricciardi, Iolanda; Mosca, Simona; Parisi, Maria; Leo, François; Hansson, Tobias; Erkintalo, Miro; Maddaloni, Pasquale; De Natale, Paolo; Wabnitz, Stefan; De Rosa, Maurizio (2020). "Optical Frequency Combs in Quadratically Nonlinear Resonators". Micromachines. 11 (2): 230. arXiv:2004.04714. doi:10.3390/mi11020230. PMC 7074798. PMID 32102284.
