= Mikkel Andersen (physicist) =

New Zealand physicist

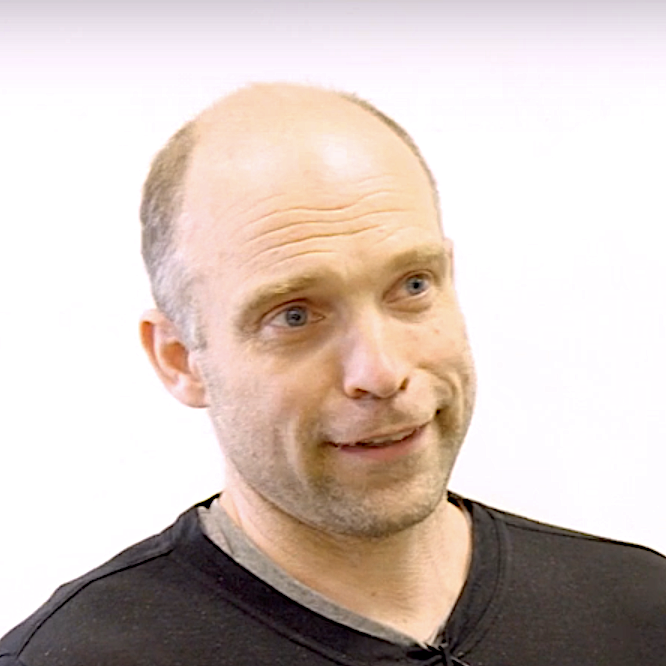
- Education: Weizmann Institute of Science
- Scientific career
- Fields: Quantum mechanics
- Workplaces: University of Otago; Dodd-Walls Centre

Mikkel F. Andersen is a physicist, an associate professor at the University of Otago, and an investigator at the Dodd-Walls Centre in Dunedin, New Zealand. His research deals with ways to capture fast-moving atoms.

== Education ==
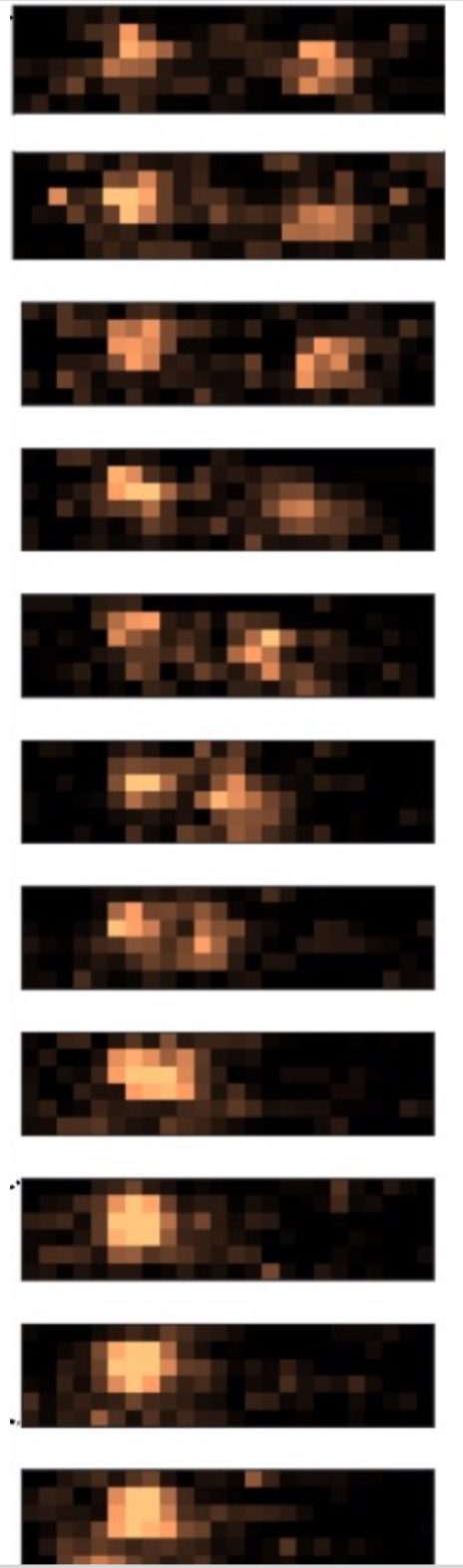
A sequence of two rubidium atoms initially in separate optical tweezers being brought together so they can interact.

Born in Denmark, Anderson did his MSc in physics and mathematics at Aarhus University, graduating in 1999. He then studied laser cooling at the Weizmann Institute of Science in Rehovot, Israel, finishing his PhD in the physics of complex systems in 2004. From 2004 to 2006 he did a post-doc at the National Institute of Standards and Technology, studying laser cooling with Nobel Laureate William D. Phillips, inventor of the Zeeman slower. After a year at New York University, he moved to Dunedin and joined the University of Otago Department of Physics as a lecturer, rising to Associate Professor.

== Areas of research ==
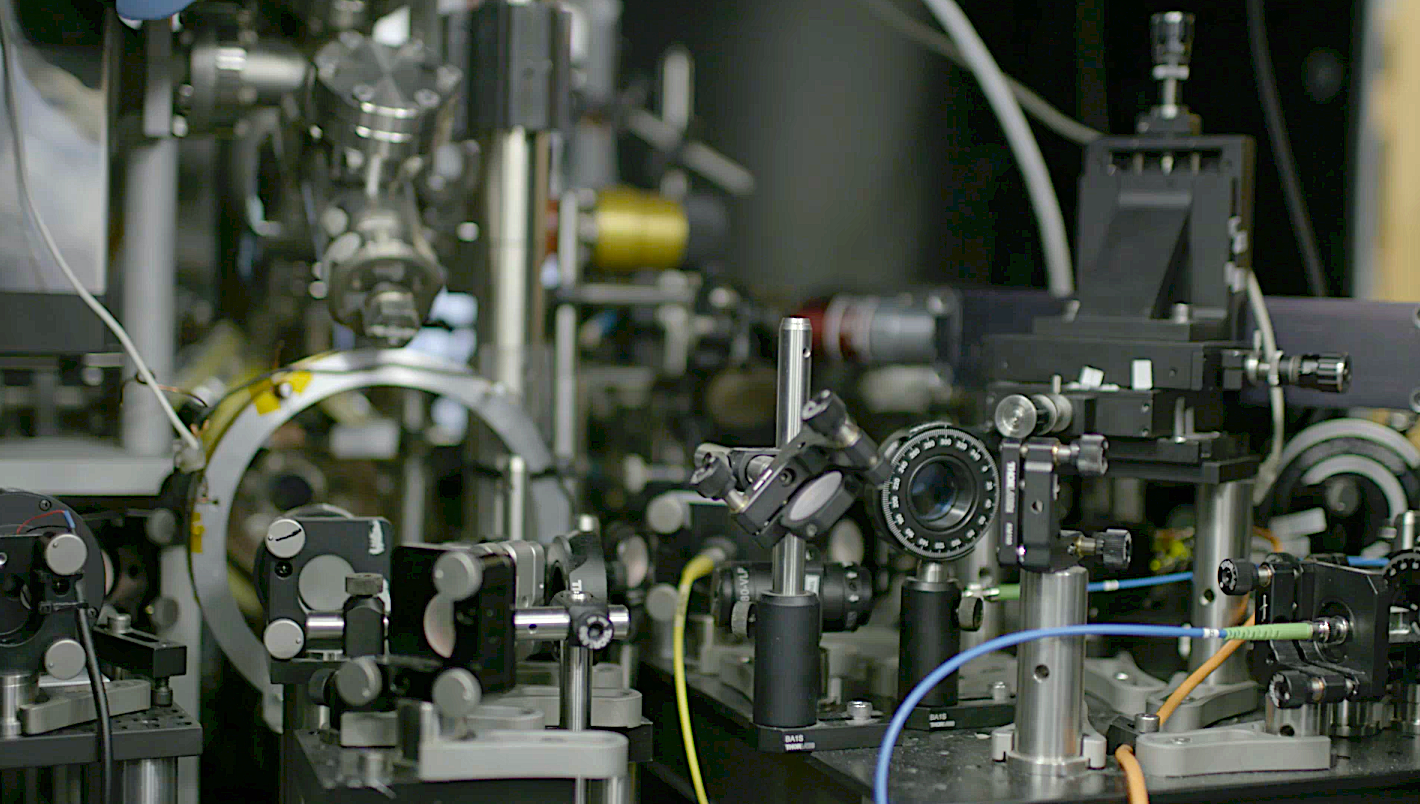
Optical equipment in Andersen lab for controlling individual atoms

One of Andersen's projects is looking at ways to create robust sources of quantum entanglement, a process which usually only works at ultra-cold temperatures. Laser cooling – shining a laser in the opposite direction an atom is travelling, slowing it and reducing its temperature to one millionth of a degree above absolute zero – puts an atom in a quantum state and allows it to be manipulated. This requires a hyper-evacuated vacuum chamber with a pressure of almost zero, an apparatus about the size of a toaster.

Andersen's team first isolated, captured, and photographed a rubidium atom in 2010. Now individual pairs of atoms can then be held in place with lasers – "optical tweezers" – and observed colliding and entangling. Previously these processes were examined statistically through experiments on large numbers of atoms, but combining multiple atoms increased the possibility of chemical reactions between them. More recent experiments have assembled three individual atoms into a molecule and measured the energy released in the process. This research has implications for quantum computer development, constructing molecules at the atomic scale, and the theoretical underpinnings of molecular assembly.

Another project is the development of an atomic gravimeter, smaller and cheaper than existing models, for measuring local fluctuations in the Earth's gravitational field.

== Selected publications ==
- Reynolds, L. A.; Schwartz, E.; Ebling, U.; Weyland, M.; Brand, J.; Andersen, M. F. (18 February 2020). "Direct Measurements of Collisional Dynamics in Cold Atom Triads". Physical Review Letters. 124 (7) 073401. arXiv:2001.05141. doi:10.1103/PhysRevLett.124.073401. PMID 32142320. S2CID 210718417.
- Sompet, Pimonpan; Szigeti, Stuart S.; Schwartz, Eyal; Bradley, Ashton S.; Andersen, Mikkel F. (2019). "Thermally robust spin correlations between two 85Rb atoms in an optical microtrap". Nature Communications. 10 (1): 1889. doi:10.1038/s41467-019-09420-6. PMC 6478867. PMID 31015406.
- Chai, Shijie; Fekete, Julia; Andersen, Mikkel F. (10 December 2018). "Measuring the local gravitational field using survival resonances in a dissipatively driven atom-optics system". Physical Review A. 98 (6) 063614. doi:10.1103/PhysRevA.98.063614. ISSN 2469-9926. S2CID 115138635.
- Grünzweig, T.; Hilliard, A.; McGovern, M.; Andersen, M. F. (2010). "Near-deterministic preparation of a single atom in an optical microtrap". Nature Physics. 6 (12): 951–954. doi:10.1038/nphys1778.
- Ryu, C.; Andersen, M.; Cladé, P.; Natarajan, Vasant; Helmerson, K.; Phillips, W. (28 December 2007). "Observation of Persistent Flow of a Bose-Einstein Condensate in a Toroidal Trap". Physical Review Letters. 99 (26) 260401. arXiv:0709.0012. doi:10.1103/PhysRevLett.99.260401. PMID 18233561. S2CID 38614544.
- Andersen, M.; Ryu, C.; Cladé, Pierre; Natarajan, Vasant; Vaziri, A.; Helmerson, K.; Phillips, W. (26 October 2006). "Quantized Rotation of Atoms from Photons with Orbital Angular Momentum". Physical Review Letters. 97 (17) 170406. arXiv:quant-ph/0607171. doi:10.1103/PhysRevLett.97.170406. PMID 17155450. S2CID 17963256.
