= David Hutchinson (physicist) =

New Zealand quantum physicist

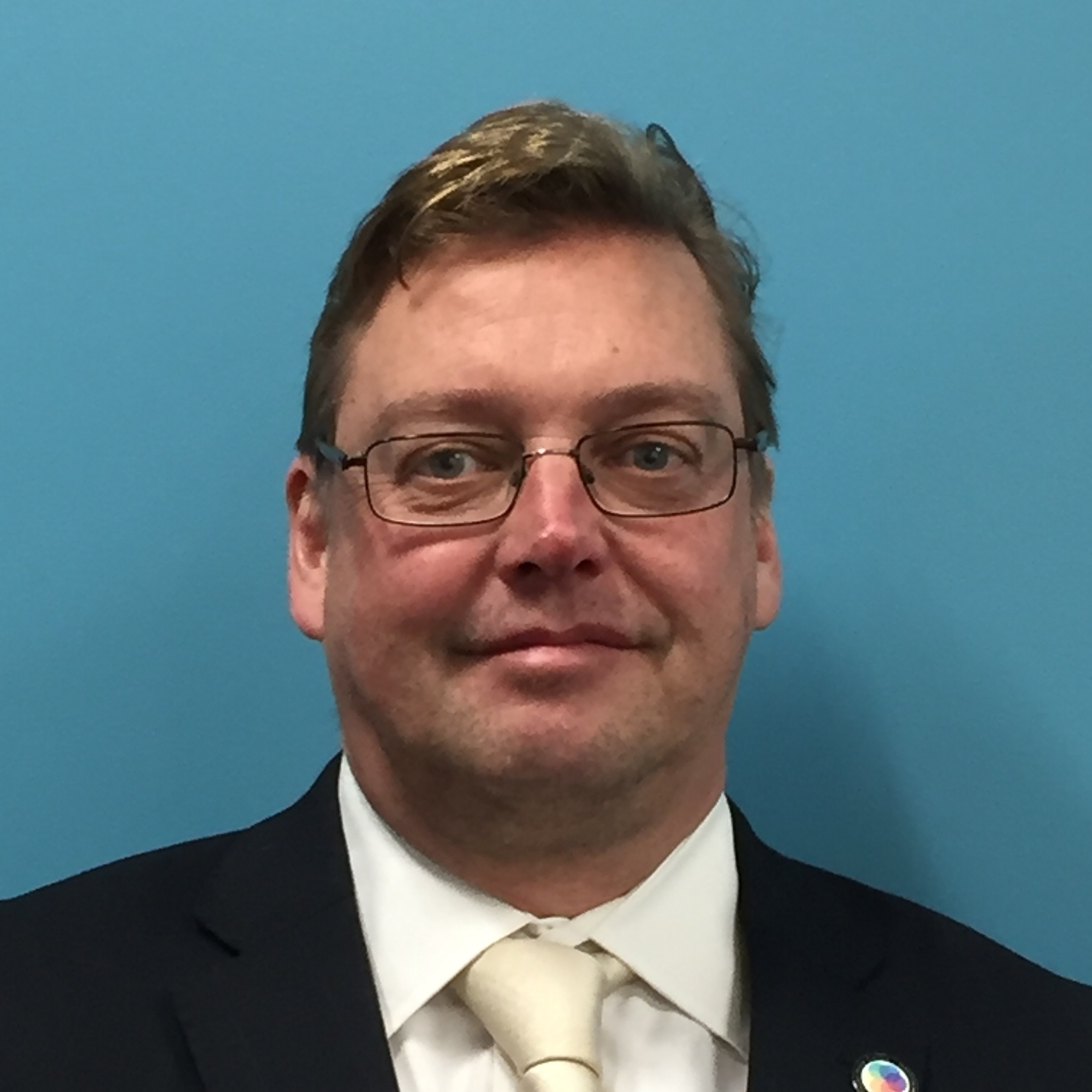
- Born: 1969 (age 56–57)
- Citizenship: New Zealand
- Education: University of Exeter
- Scientific career
- Workplaces: University of Otago, Dodd-Walls Centre

David A. W. Hutchinson (born 1969) is a quantum physicist and professor in Department of Physics at the University of Otago, Dunedin, New Zealand. He was the inaugural director of the Dodd-Walls Centre for Photonic and Quantum Technologies, a New Zealand government-funded national Centre of Research Excellence. He served as director from the centre's inception in January 2015 through to the end of March 2023. Hutchinson's research interests are in the areas of quantum biology, Bose-Einstein condensates, and the underlying mathematics of quantum physics.

== Biography ==
Born in England in 1969, Hutchinson completed a BSc at the University of Exeter, UK, and received a PhD degree there in 1994 in the area of theoretical physics. Whilst at Exeter he was awarded half colours in 1992 for "excellence in student sport". He also holds a PGDip (Arts) in philosophy from the University of Otago.

He moved to New Zealand in 2000, and became a full citizen in February 2015. Hutchinson is currently chair of the board at Otago Museum, and was a departmental science advisor for New Zealand's Ministry of Business, Innovation and Employment from 2021 - 2024.

== Academic career ==
Hutchinson held postdoctoral research fellowships at Dublin City University, Ireland, and then at Queen's University at Kingston, Ontario. He was lecturer in physics at Somerville College, University of Oxford in the UK from 1997 to 2000. After visiting the University of Otago, Dunedin, New Zealand during a Royal Society of London Study Visit in 1998, he moved to Dunedin in 2000 to take up a lectureship position at the university. He was promoted to senior lecturer in 2003, then associate professor, and in February 2015 became a full professor. In 2004 he was the first recipient of Otago University's Rowheath Trust Award and Carl Smith Medal, for outstanding research performance by an early-career researcher. He attended the annual World Economic Forum "Meeting of New Champions" in Tianjin (2008) and Dalian (2009), selected as "one of the world's 60 outstanding young scientists"; the attendees went on to form the Global Young Academy in Berlin in 2010, of which Hutchinson is an alumnus.

Hutchinson was a member of the Jack Dodd Centre for Quantum Technology at Otago's Department of Physics, and served as the director from 2010 to 2015, except for a period in 2012 when he was a visiting professor at the Centre for Quantum Technologies at the National University of Singapore. In 2018 Hutchinson was visiting fellow at Merton College at the University of Oxford, an opportunity given to just a handful of educators around the world per year.

On 1 January 2015 he became director of the newly founded Dodd-Walls Centre for Photonic and Quantum Technologies, a Centre of Research Excellence (CoRE). Hosted by the University of Otago, the Dodd-Walls centre is composed of approximately 200 researchers and students from six New Zealand universities: Otago University, the University of Auckland, Victoria University of Wellington, AUT, Massey University, and the University of Canterbury.

Hutchinson is a passionate practitioner of education outreach, giving regular talks in schools and community organisations. In 2017 he was one of a team of science educators, including Ian Griffin, who visited the Chatham Islands to work with school pupils. He has participated in several marae-based Science Wānanga and worked with the Lab in a Box programme around New Zealand.

During his time with Lab in a Box, Hutchinson attended Polyfest in 2020 with the Dodd-Walls Centre, connecting with Pasifika students. He also attended the New Zealand LUMA Light Festival in 2018 in a similar capacity, with more than 2,000 people struck by the Lab in a Box attraction.

Hutchinson has worked at the intersection of art and science as an outreach tool, working at both an organisational level and as a practitioner. An example of this was a mural he commissioned from Dunedin artist Bruce Mahalski during his time as director at the Dodd Walls Centre in 2022. The mural used ultraviolet light-reactive paint to bring the art alive at night. Hutchinson is also part of the shortlisting panel for Quantum Shorts, a science-based flash-fiction writing competition.

He has been a member of the Trust Board of the Otago Museum since 2008 and took over as chair of the board after the death of Graham Crombie in 2019. He is a fellow and past president of the New Zealand Institute of Physics, and former president of the Otago Institute, the Royal Society Te Apārangi's Otago-Southland branch. He is also an elected fellow of the UK's Institute of Physics.

In 2022 Hutchinson was awarded the Royal Society Te Apārangi's Thomson Medal, for "establishing and developing the Dodd-Walls Centre for Photonic and Quantum Technologies, advocating for early career researchers and developing outreach partnerships through the museum sector".

== Research ==
Hutchinson is a theoretical physicist, specialising in quantum systems and ultra-cold atomic gases. Specifically, he examines the effects of disorder in Bose–Einstein condensates (systems first created in 1995, and at University of Otago since 1998, which form at close to absolute zero). He has also worked on understanding energy transport on the FMO complex found in deep-sea bacteria which rely on infrared photons, and its possible implications for producing more efficient solar photovoltaic panels.
