= Dodd-Walls Centre =

Research centre at Otago University in New Zealand

Dodd-Walls Centre (English) Te Whai Ao (Māori)
- Te Whai Ao — Dodd-Walls Centre for Photonic and Quantum Technologies
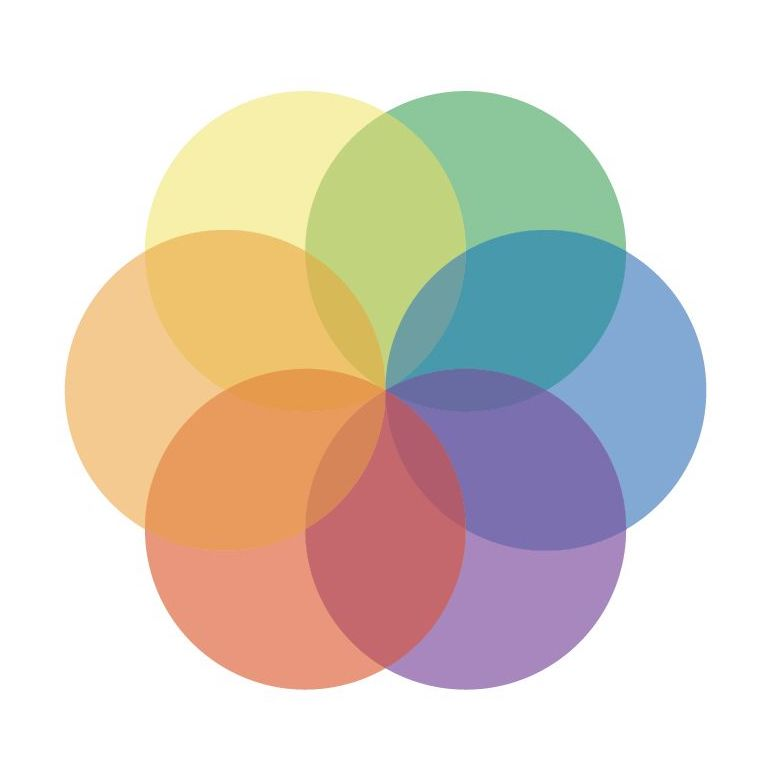
- Formation: 1 January 2015
- Type: Physics research institute
- Headquarters: Dunedin, New Zealand
- Director: Frédérique Vanholsbeeck
- Affiliations: University of Otago
- Staff: 220
- Website: doddwalls.ac.nz

The Dodd-Walls Centre for Photonic and Quantum Technologies (Māori: Te Whai Ao) is a New Zealand Centre of Research Excellence, established in 2015, hosted by the University of Otago, and composed of researchers in six New Zealand universities as well as partner institutions in the US, United Kingdom, and Singapore. It does fundamental research on the quantum nature of matter, the physics and optics of light, and the manipulation of individual photons. New knowledge and applications are commercialised for industries including agritech, medicine, and civil engineering.

== Origins ==
The Dodd-Walls Centre is named after the New Zealand physicists Jack Dodd and Dan Walls. Both men were mentored by Nobel Prize winners – Roy Glauber in the case of Dan Walls, and Willis Lamb in the case of Jack Dodd – and both become highly influential in the development and growth of quantum optics, photonics and ultra-cold atoms, and physics in general in New Zealand.

Before 2015 two research centres bore those names: the Jack Dodd Centre for Quantum Technology at the University of Otago, under the directorship of Crispin Gardiner 2006–2009, Rob Ballagh 2009–2010, and David Hutchinson afterwards, and the Dan Walls Centre for Pure and Applied Optics at the University of Auckland, directed first by John Harvey and then by Cather Simpson. For seven years there was a collaboration between the two research centres called the Dodd-Walls Centre for Quantum Science, with two co-directors (the directors of each collaborating institution). This "Dodd-Walls Centre" held the first Dodd-Walls Annual Symposium in Auckland in 2007.

In 2006–2007, under the leadership of Gardiner and Harvey, a bid was made for Centre of Research Excellence (CoRE) funding for the Dodd-Walls Centre from New Zealand's Tertiary Education Commission. This bid did not succeed, but a second bid in 2013–2014 led by David Hutchinson was successful, and on 1 January 2015 the Dodd-Walls Centre for Photonic and Quantum Technologies become one of six New Zealand Centres of Research Excellence, with Hutchinson as the inaugural director. It was formally launched in February 2015 at an event at Larnach Castle by Minister for Research, Science and Innovation Steven Joyce. In October 2020 it received a further $36.75 million in funding from the Tertiary Education Commission to support its work through to 2028.

The Dodd-Walls Centre currently comprises researchers in six New Zealand universities (in addition to Otago University, the University of Auckland, Victoria University of Wellington, AUT, Massey University, and the University of Canterbury) as well as collaborations with USA, United Kingdom, and Singapore.

Directors of the Dodd-Walls Center
Name	Term	Notes
Frédérique Vanholsbeeck	2023–present	Director
Joachim Brand	2023–present	Deputy Director
David Hutchinson	2014–2023	Director
Neil Broderick	2014–2023	Deputy Director

== Research ==
The Dodd-Walls Centre has over 220 researchers and students, working in quantum optics, photonics and precision atomic physics.

=== Photonic sensors and imaging ===
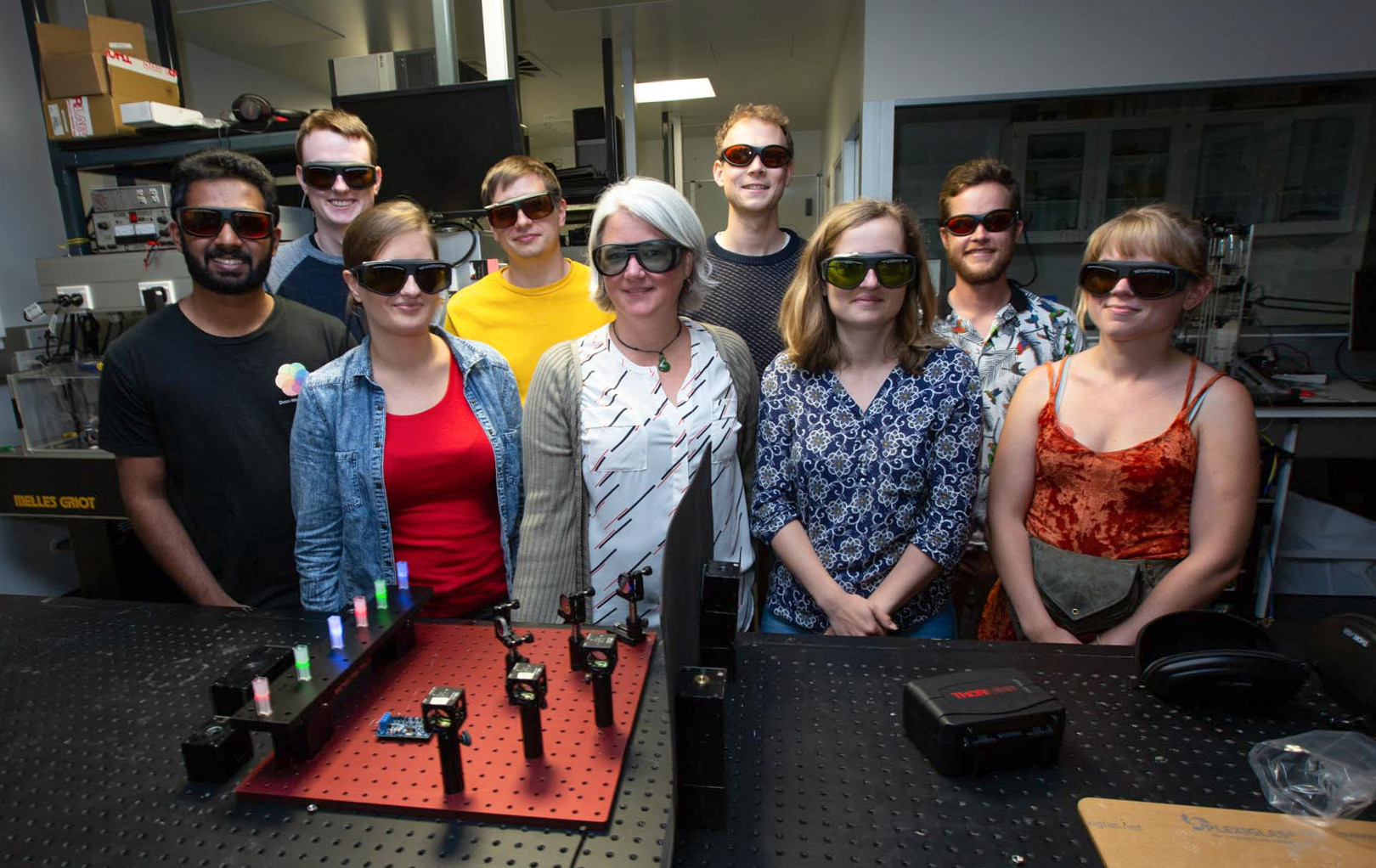
Frédérique Vanholsbeeck and students in their lab at the University of Auckland

Dodd-Walls Centre researchers are developing, applying and improving laser spectroscopy techniques to sense and image a variety of surfaces and systems. Experimental research is underpinned by theory and numerical modelling with an emphasis on nonlinear optics.

Frédérique Vanholsbeeck and her team in the Biophotonics Group at the University of Auckland are using optical coherence tomography (OCT) to measure neural activity, detect cancer and eye disease, image bone cartilage for early signs of osteoarthritis, and monitor cardiac activity. They are using fluorescence spectroscopy to do near real-time measurements of bacteria on food and for diagnosing gastrointestinal diseases.

Keith Gordon and his group at the University of Otago use Raman spectroscopy and vibrational spectroscopy along with computational chemistry to analyse the molecular structure, function and composition of materials. They have applied their techniques to optimise solar cells, measure microplastics in the environment, identify crystalline forms of pharmaceuticals, assess the quality and composition of foodstuffs, analyse historical artefacts and biological specimens and develop tools for medical diagnosis.

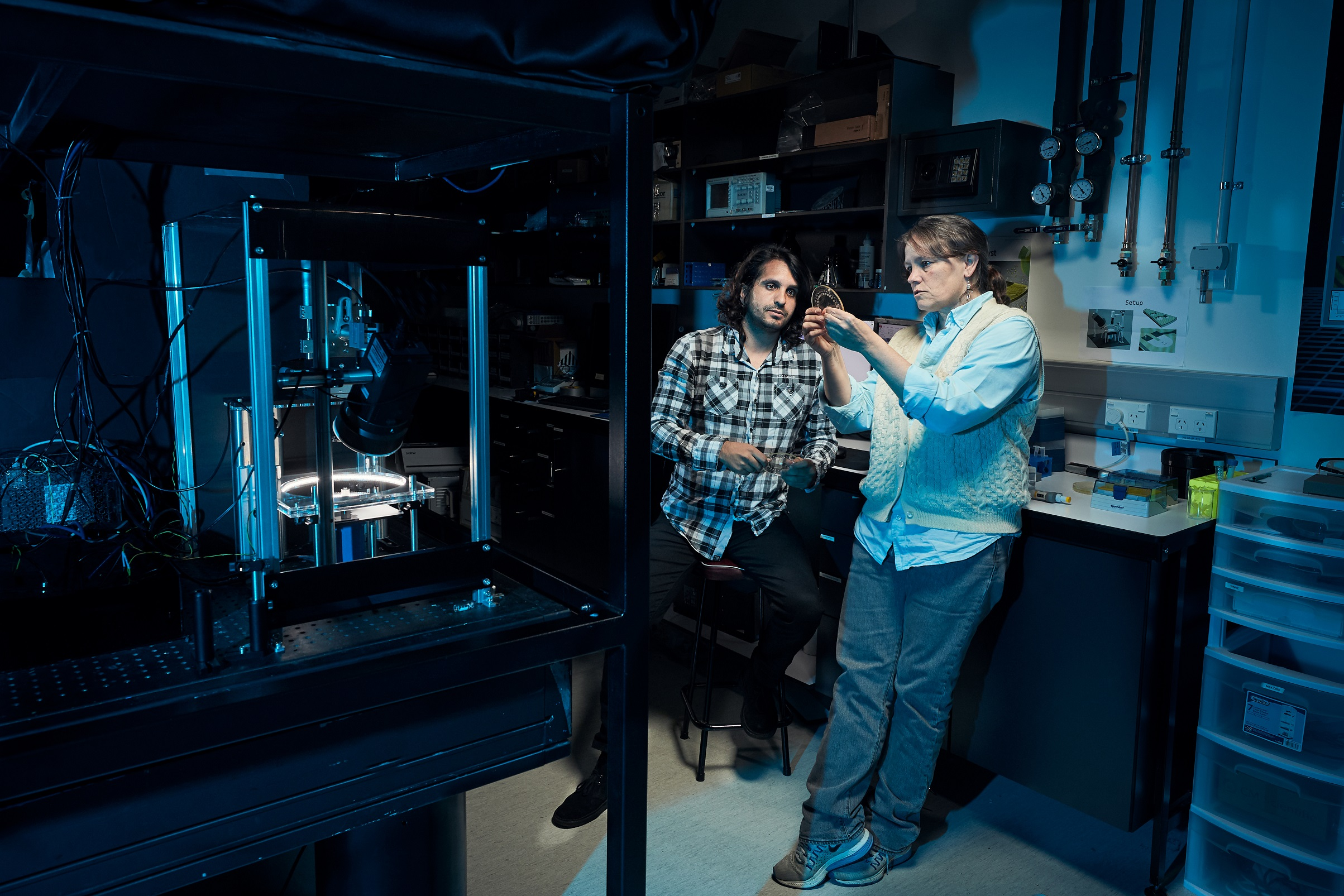
Matheus Vargas and Cather Simpson in the Photon Factory, University of Auckland

Kasper van Wijk and Jami Shepherd Johnson at the Physical Acoustics Laboratory at the University of Auckland use photoacoustic, ultrasonic, and laser-ultrasonic imaging techniques inspired by geophysical methods. Outside, targets include the Auckland volcanic field, geothermal exploration, and micro-seismicity for fluid reservoir characterisation. In the laboratory, they have measured the structure of rock and ice, the stiffness of wood, the structure of bone and arteries and the firmness of fruit.

Neil Broderick from the University of Auckland is collaborating with researchers at Victoria University of Wellington to measure vibrations and temperature in the Alpine Fault in New Zealand's South Island using an optical fibre inserted down a 900m borehole into the fault.

Cather Simpson and researchers in the Photon Factory at the University of Auckland are developing sensors to sort bull sperm for the dairy industry, measure the composition of milk and test for immunity to COVID-19. This research is the basis for spin-off companies Engender and Orbis Diagnostics.

=== Photonic sources and components ===
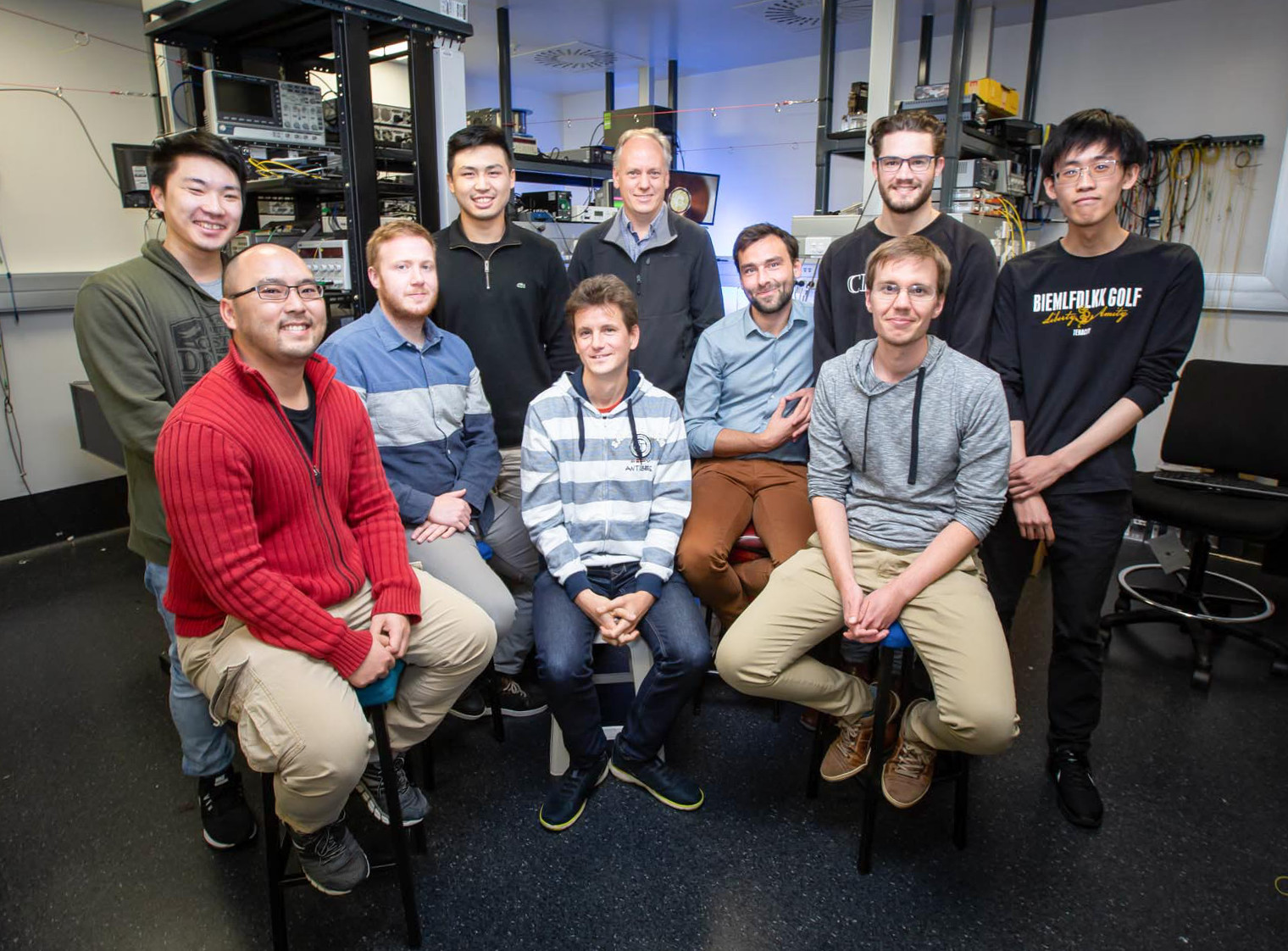
Miro Erkintalo (front right) with his research team at the University of Auckland.

Researchers are developing new laser-based technologies, materials, and tools for applications in fundamental research and industry. Theoretical research and numerical modelling of nonlinear effects such as rogue waves and temporal cavity solitons underpins the development of novel technologies.

Miro Erkintalo, Stuart Murdoch and Stéphane Coen at the University of Auckland and Harald Schwefel at the University of Otago have contributed significantly towards the development of microresonator frequency combs based on small crystals used to store and transform laser light into different frequencies. Erkintalo received the New Zealand Prime Minister's 2019 MacDiarmid Emerging Scientist Prize and the 2016 Royal Society of New Zealand Hamilton Prize for his pioneering contributions towards this field.

In the Photon Factory at the University of Auckland researchers use mode-locked lasers that produce exotic ultra-short pulses of light in the femtosecond (fs) and picosecond (ps) range for applications in micro-machining, micro-fabrication and spectroscopy. University of Auckland researchers also specialise in the behaviour of light in optical fibres. The Auckland company Southern Photonics, which designs and manufactures instruments for light generation and analysis, is underpinned by this research.

=== Quantum fluids and gases ===
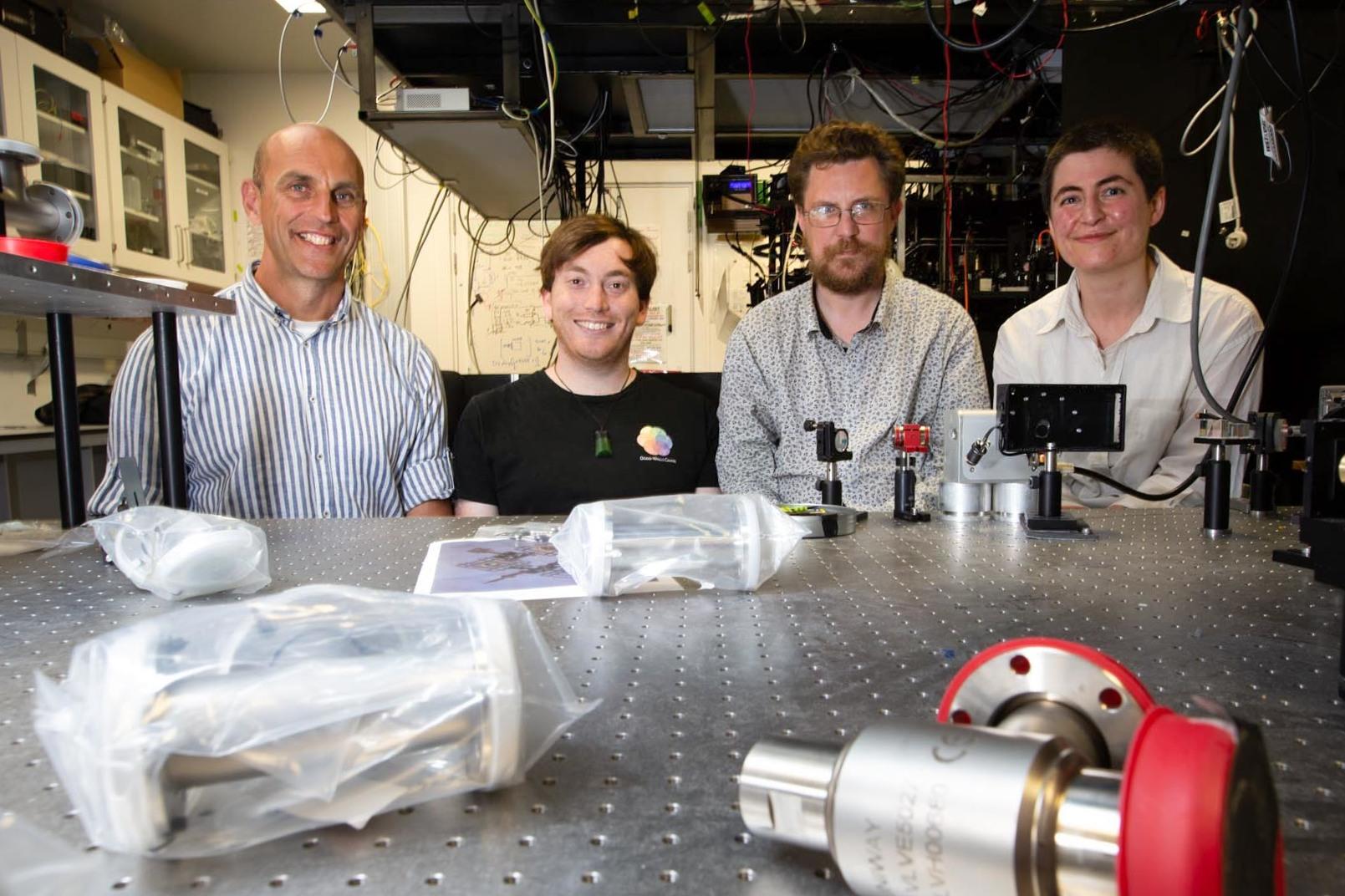
Maarten Hoogerland with students in his lab at the University of Auckland

Other Dodd-Walls Centre research involves fundamental experimental and theoretical studies of ultra-cold quantum gases, including cold, controlled collisions and cold quantum chemistry. Quantum fluids such as Bose–Einstein condensates are configured to emulate the physics of other less accessible or controllable quantum systems. This allows for direct investigation of condensed matter and many-body phenomena whose fundamental understanding remains obscure. Niels Kjærgaard and his group have developed a novel particle collider to perform high precision atomic physics measurements. They use optical tweezers to capture and collide small clouds of ultra-cold atoms to observe the quantum dynamics of low speed collisions. Maarten Hoogerland's experiments with ultra-cold helium atoms have led to very precise measurements of the size, colour absorption and energy difference between quantum states of the helium atoms. They have also provided tests for the standard model of particle physics. Theorist Ashton Bradley has advanced understanding of quantum and classical turbulence and vortices. Theorists Blair Blakie and Danny Baillie correctly predicted the formation of stable quantum droplets of ultra-cold magnetic gases.

Cold gases are also providing a path to precision measurement. Mikkel Andersen and his group, for example, have developed a compact low-cost gravimeter based on atom interferometry.

=== Quantum manipulation and information ===
Through precise observation and control of the interactions between single photons of light and single atoms, researchers are contributing to the development of quantum technologies such as quantum computers. Dodd-Walls Centre researchers, such as Howard Carmichael and the Centre's namesake Dan Walls, helped to lay theoretical foundations for modern quantum optics and quantum technology. Carmichael's quantum trajectory theory (QTT), a form of the quantum jump method, gives a way to predict how individual quantum objects behave when they are observed. In a recent collaboration with Yale University, Carmichael used QTT to help reveal the fundamental nature of quantum jumps as smooth rather than instantaneous, a discovery that could help solve the error problem in quantum computing.

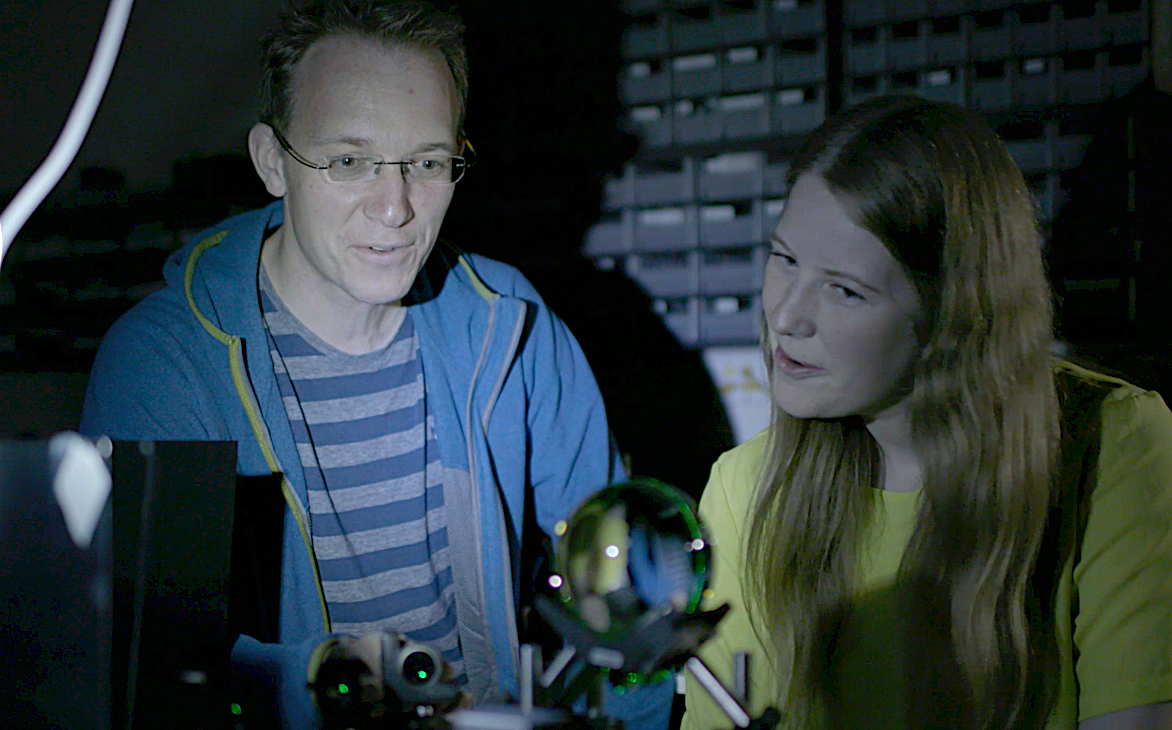
Harald Schwefel and PhD student Bianca Sawyer, University of Otago

Much research is focused on the development of enabling technologies for quantum computers, with several researchers focused on enabling secure transport of quantum information over large distances. Theorist Scott Parkins, in collaboration with Japanese experimentalist Takao Aoki, has demonstrated an early stage quantum computing network made of optical fibres that achieves quantum entanglement over distances exceeding a metre. Experimentalist Maarten Hoogerland is working on similar optical fibre-based quantum computing systems. Harald Schwefel has developed a technique to up-convert single microwave photons into optical photons using dielectric whispering-gallery-mode resonators. This would enable the use of optical networks to transport quantum information between microwave-based quantum computers. Jevon Longdell is also developing a method for converting single microwave photons into optical photons using crystals doped with rare-earth ions. Longdell has also developed a method for storing quantum information in crystals doped with rare earth ions which provides an improved method solution for quantum computers.

Mikkel Anderson has developed a technique to reliably and consistently produce individually trapped atoms which is used to control the motion and quantum state of atoms and bring them together to form molecules in ultra-precise experiments.

Some Dodd-Walls Centre researchers

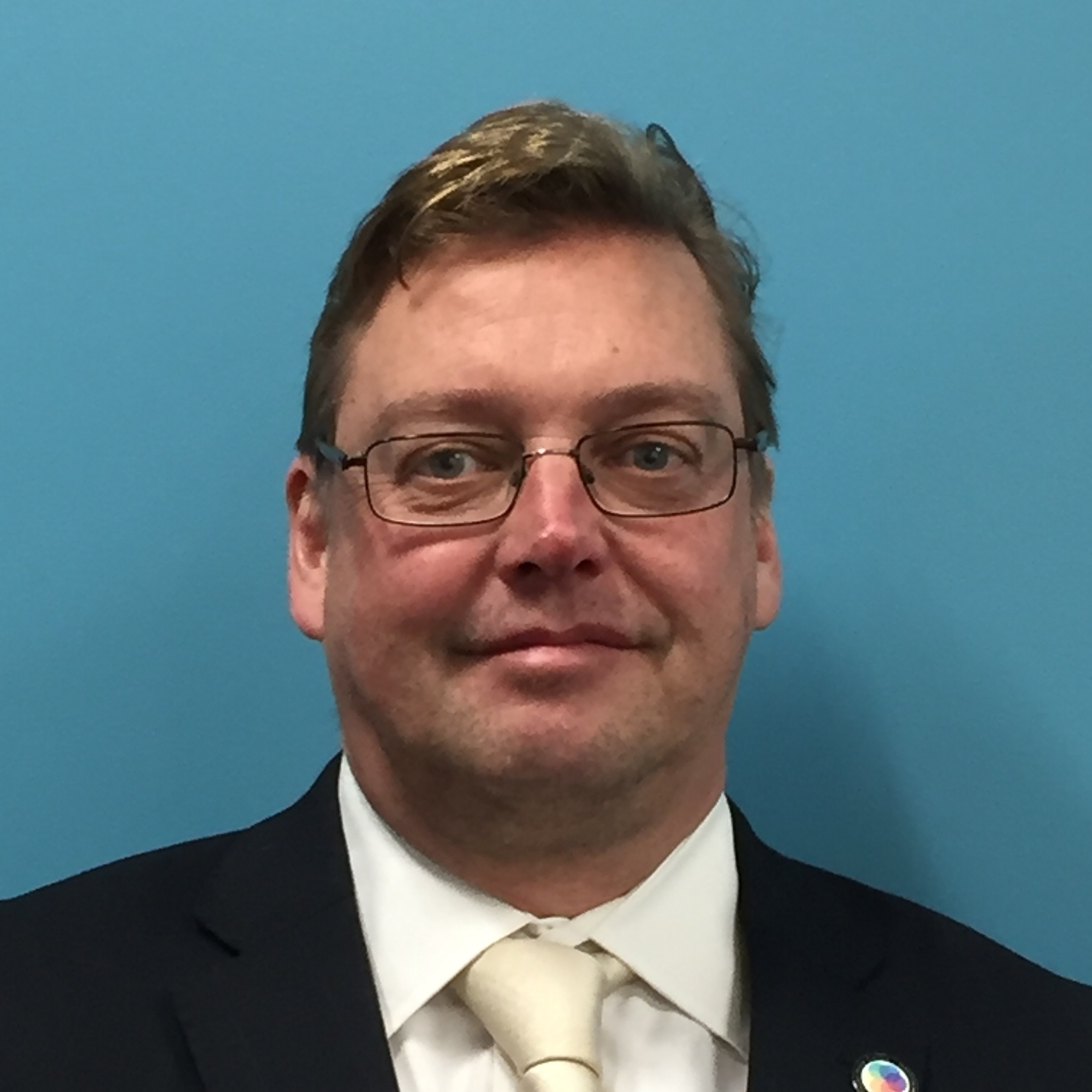
David Hutchinson, Director

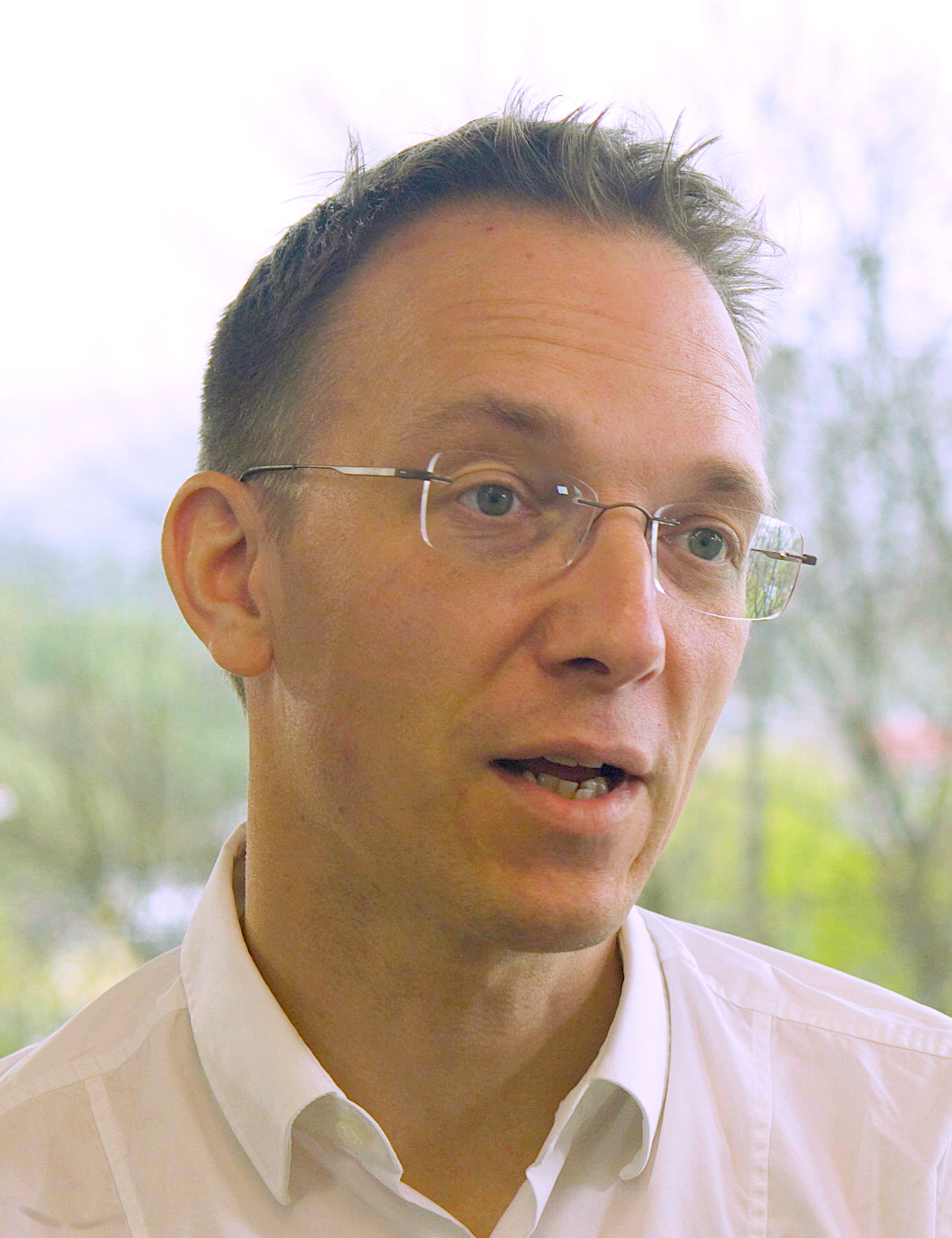
Harald Schwefel

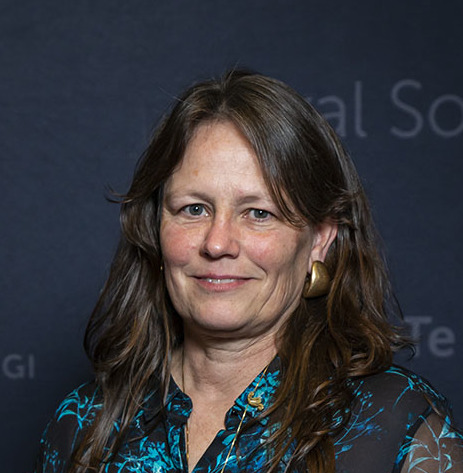
Cather Simpson

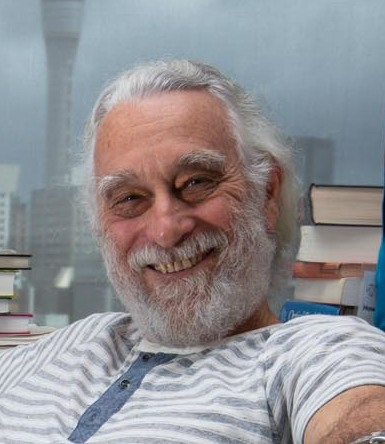
Howard Carmichael

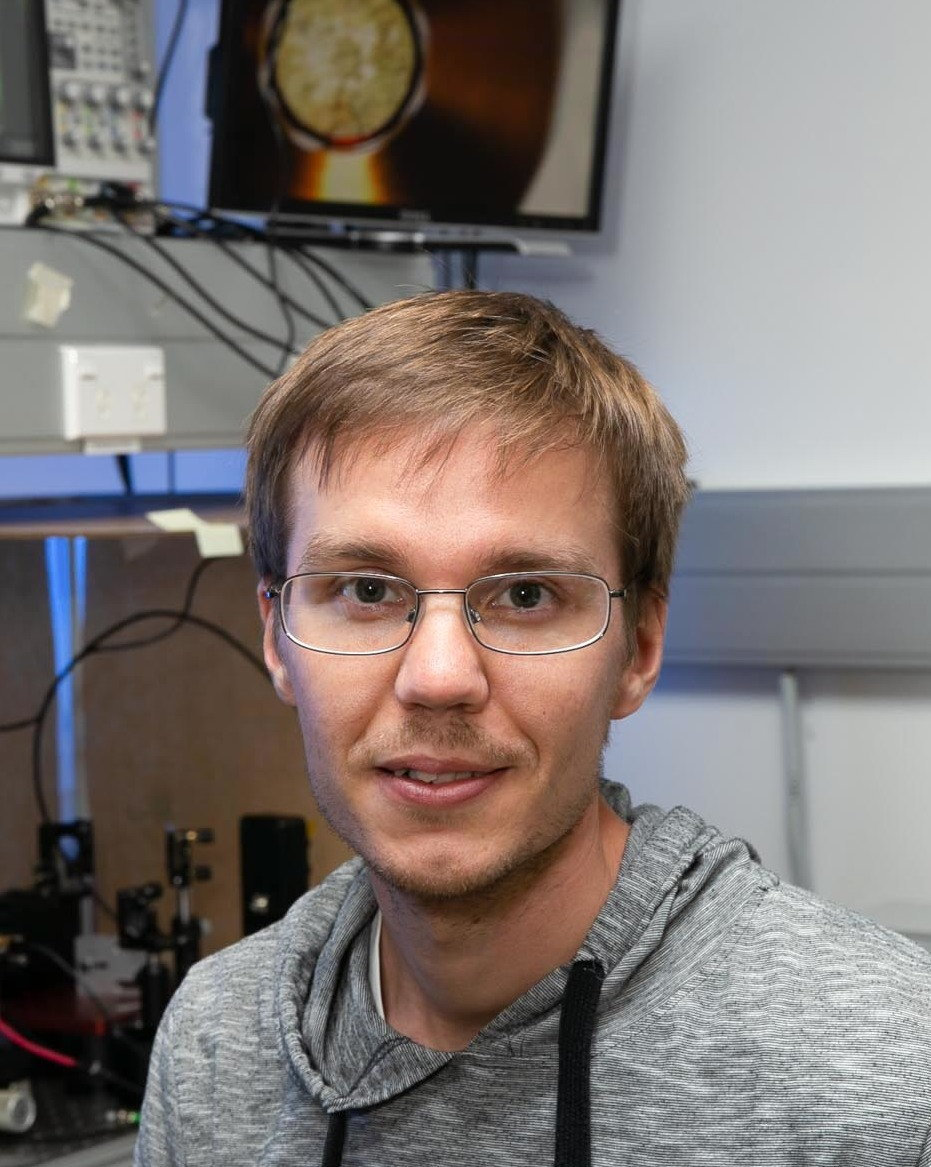
Miro Erkintalo

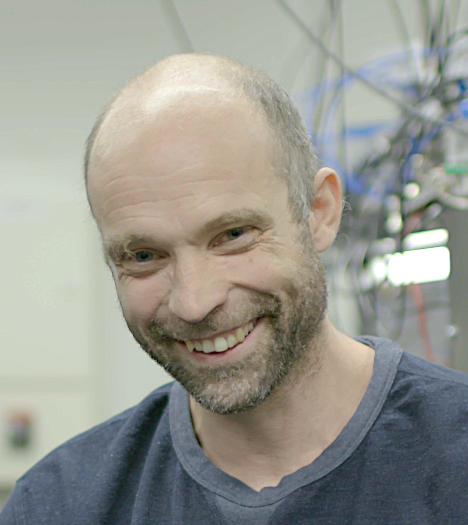
Mikkel Andersen

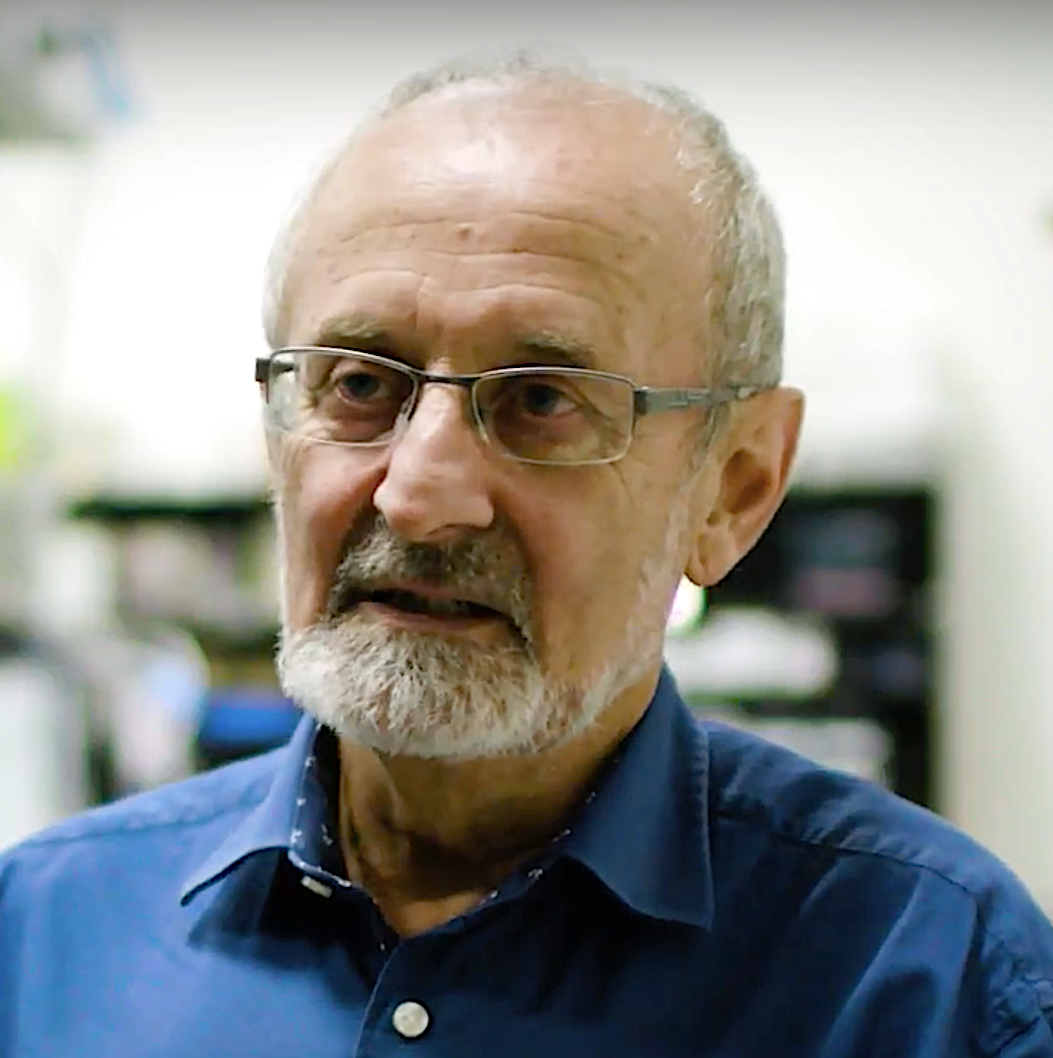
John Harvey

== Commercial activity ==
The Dodd-Walls Centre's vision, according to director David Hutchinson, is to contribute to the development of an ecosystem of photonics-based companies that support each other and export to the world. Hutchinson envisages these companies providing jobs and stimulating New Zealand's economy and culture focusing on creating high-value products out of cheap materials. Industry Team Leader John Harvey and Industry Advisory Board Member Simon Poole co-authored a report, released in July 2020, which reviewed the photonics industries in New Zealand and Australia; the report estimates New Zealand's photonics industry to be worth NZ$1.2 billion.

The Dodd-Walls Centre has an industry development team which focuses on solving specific industry problems, creating prototype devices and developing Dodd-Walls research for commercialisation. In 2017 the Dodd-Walls Centre collaborated with the MacDiarmid Institute to run an "interface challenge," where New Zealand companies brought specific problems to scientists, academics and researchers from the two Centres of Research Excellence to help solve them. Seven New Zealand companies, including Fisher & Paykel Healthcare and Buckley Systems, took part.

=== Companies associated with the Dodd-Walls Centre ===
Cather Simpson's two companies, Engender and Orbis Diagnostics, were spun-out from Dodd-Walls Centre research. In 2016 Simpson won a KiwiNet Research Commercialisation Award for Orbis Diagnostics, which is developing a method to sort bovine sperm into males and females using light pulses. Simpson has spoken publicly about her ideas for how universities can better spark innovation and positive economic benefit for their cities, regions and countries. She has also spoken of her vision for "transforming the Photon Factory into a thriving, high-impact "innovation hub". Director David Hutchinson has spoken publicly about the potential economic benefits for New Zealand of developing technologies and spin-off companies through quantum physics and photonics. He believes this will "counter the scientific brain drain" by contributing to "the development of career pathways for highly skilled individuals to stay in New Zealand".

The Dodd-Walls Centre partners with Auckland-based company Southern Photonics, which was founded in 2001 by John Harvey with three of his students to provide high-tech opportunities for PhD graduates. Southern Photonics produces a range of optical pulse test and measurement equipment for use in the telecommunications industry and in academic and industry research laboratories worldwide based on Dodd-Walls Centre research. Dunedin-based company Photonic Innovations, which produces ultra-sensitive gas detection equipment, also partners with the Dodd-Walls Centre.

=== Primary industry collaborations ===
According to Director David Hutchinson, Dodd-Walls scientists are working with the New Zealand meat, dairy, fruit and wool industries to add value to export products. "Shining a light on a sample of material and analysing what comes back reveals a huge amount of information about the structure, function and quality of the material," Hutchinson says. Frederique Vanholsbeeck and other Dodd-Walls Centre researchers are part of a collaboration with the New Zealand meat industry along with researchers from Crown Research Institute AgResearch and other New Zealand universities to develop technologies for detecting bacteria (using fluorescence spectroscopy) and measuring the quality of meat. Postdoctoral research fellow Sam Hitchman won the International Meat Secretariat (IMS) Prize for Young Talent in Meat Science and Technology at the International Congress of Meat Science and Technology (ICoMST) in 2019.

=== Medical technologies ===
Medical technology is another focus of the Dodd-Walls Centre. The University of Otago's Sara Miller is developing a tool for diagnosing coeliac disease and other gastrointestinal diseases using laser spectroscopy, and University of Auckland PhD student Simon Ashforth is developing tools for bone surgery using femtosecond lasers. Dodd-Walls scientists are also working on techniques for detecting eye disease, skin burns and several other conditions.

== Educational outreach ==
The Dodd-Walls Centre sponsors, organises and delivers a range of educational outreach programmes and activities to children and communities across New Zealand and the Pacific region. These include school visits, touring exhibitions and events. They focus on hands-on interactive science activities and frequently partner with Otago Museum, Museum of Transport and Technology and the MacDiarmid Institute. The aim of the outreach programme is to increase the diversity of representation in physical sciences in New Zealand at all levels from undergraduate through to university faculty. Efforts are made to reach communities and demographics which traditionally don't engage in science with particular emphasis on Māori and Pacific Islanders, rural communities and women and girls. Programmes are developed and delivered by volunteer students and researchers from the centre along with dedicated museum educators. In 2018 the Centre engaged over 13,000 people in over 82 events, ranging from public talks about gravitational waves to an International Day of Light science fair.

=== UNESCO International Year of Light 2015 ===
The Dodd-Walls Centre's coordinated outreach efforts started in 2015 when Cather Simpson took the position of co-chair on the New Zealand International Year of Light Committee. This celebration, led by UNESCO, sought to raise awareness of the importance of light and light-based technologies in all facets of our lives—whether economic, artistic or scientific. A team of researchers and students from across the Dodd-Walls Centre worked in collaboration with eight museums in cities and small towns around New Zealand to organise activities and events. They were funded by the New Zealand government under the Unlocking Curious Minds program. Through engagement with Māori, the celebration was given the name Te Kōanga, the Māori word for spring. The programme included art and logo competitions, a launch event at MOTAT, hands-on demonstrations of light-based experiments, expert speakers, light-themed science shows, UV face painting, immersive 3-D experiences, light-inspired songs and music, astronomy sessions and a finale event in Otago. Outreach coordinator and PhD student Andy Wang led the creation of low-cost take-home optics kits for children containing light-related hands-on experiments that were made available to tens of thousands of New Zealand children and youth. These activities ranged from fluorescent bacteria to edible optics, and the box itself acted as a spectroscope with interactive experiments.

Since 2015, Dodd-Walls researchers and students have organised events and activities for UNESCO's annual Day of Light, which is celebrated on 16 May, the anniversary of the first successful operation of the laser in 1960. In 2020 these included hands on science events for children at Otago Museum and the Ellen Melville Centre in Auckland. In 2019 Cather Simpson wrote an article and gave a talk for UNESCO on the use of light-based technologies for sustainable farming. Simpson says the Day of Light encourages the Dodd-Walls Centre to connect their grassroots research with global issues of social justice and sustainability.

=== Outreach to Pacific Islands and remote areas of New Zealand ===
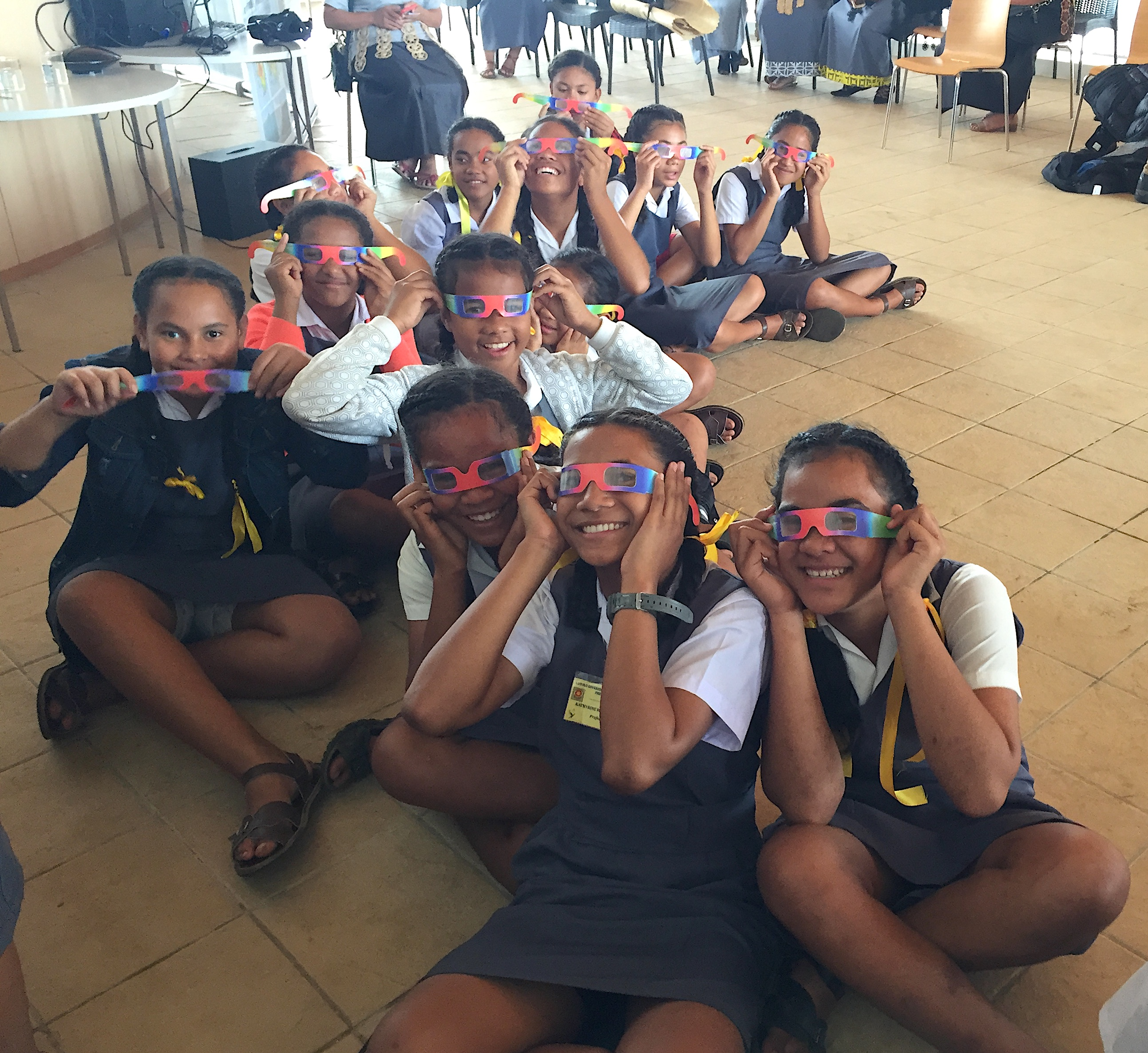
Tongan students using diffraction glasses in a Dodd-Walls Centre-supported education programme

In 2017 the centre began a collaboration with Otago Museum celled "Extreme Science", an interactive science programme aimed at New Zealand's hard to reach and remote communities. With support from the New Zealand government's Unlocking Curious Minds programme a team of scientists, students and museum educators visited the Chatham and Pitt Islands and delivered a series of interactive science activities to children, families and locals. The team presented talks, shows and interactive activities at schools, community centres, a pub and Kopinga Marae. They set up a portable planetarium and gifted a telescope and seismometer for the community.

Since then the Extreme Science programme has been extended to other remote parts of New Zealand including The East Cape, Fiordland, Stewart Island, West Coast, the Bay of Islands and Great Barrier Island.

The Dodd-Walls Centre has also been part of educational outreach programmes to Niue, the Cook Islands, Tonga and Fiji organised by Otago Museum with funding from the United States Embassy, Air New Zealand and the New Zealand Ministry of Foreign Affairs and Trade.

Through the University of Otago, the centre takes part in a programme called Science Wananga, which takes place on marae and aims to build connections with Māori communities and create learning opportunities for school students and scientists. Science topics are chosen by community and schools and often include field work and hands-on activities. University researchers and postgraduate students take part. Everyone stays on marae together and in the evenings kaumatua share their traditional knowledge and science.

=== Encouraging women and girls in science ===
Several of the centre's outreach activities focus on addressing the gender imbalance in the physical sciences by encouraging more girls and women to engage. The centre partnered with the Otago Museum and the MacDiarmid Institute to deliver a project called Full STE(a)M Ahead which aimed to build relationships between young people in the Dunedin and Southland region with role models and mentors involved in STEM subjects. The programme involves workshops, panel discussions and a portrait exhibition called 100 women, 100 words - infinite possibilities. The exhibition aims to change young people's perceptions of who a scientist is: it will display photos of 100 women nominated by members of the community, along with a caption of a hundred words describing the role STEM has played in their life.

The centre has hosted and taken part in a number of activities around International Women's Day including a series of workshops for school students and educators at Otago Museum in 2019 and a talk by Cather Simpson for 200 high-school students at the Perimeter Institute's annual "Inspiring Future Women in Science" conference. In 2018 they hosted a panel discussion on women's leadership in science and industry to celebrate the 125th anniversary of women gaining the right to vote in New Zealand.

=== Museum exhibitions and arts collaboration ===
The Dodd-Walls centre contributed to the development of the science exhibition Might Small Mighty Bright which tours New Zealand. This exhibition, developed in partnership with MOTAT, Otago Museum, and the MacDiarmid Institute, invites visitors to explore photonics, advanced materials and nanotechnology through hands-on experiments, and gives examples of New Zealand innovations. The centre is also involved in interactive workshops blending physics and theatre arts.
