= Cather Simpson =

NZ–American physicist/chemist

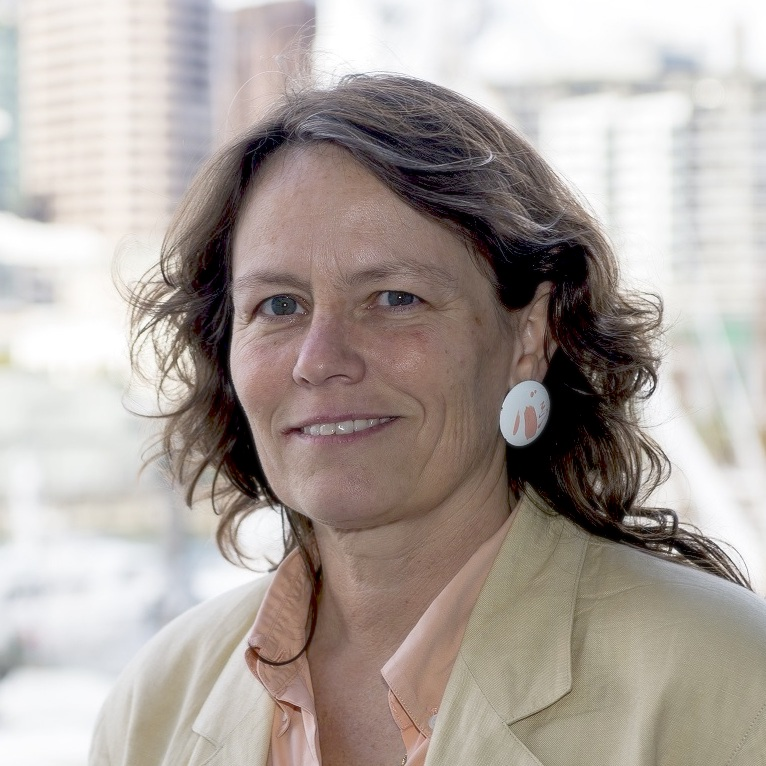
- KiwiNet Research Commercialisation Awards, June 2016
- Other name: Miriam Cather Simpson
- Education: University of Virginia, University of New Mexico School of Medicine
- Scientific career
- Workplaces: Sandia National Laboratories, Case Western Reserve University, University of Auckland, MacDiarmid Institute, Dodd-Walls Centre
- Thesis: Functional dynamics in metalloporphyrin systems (1994)

Miriam Cather Simpson is a New Zealand-American physics/chemistry academic and entrepreneur. She is currently a professor at the University of Auckland, a joint appointment between the physics and chemistry departments. She is the founder of the Photon Factory laser lab at the University of Auckland and the chief science officer for two spin-off companies, Engender Technologies and Orbis Diagnostics. She is an Associate Investigator for the Dodd-Walls Centre for Photonic and Quantum Technologies and an Emeritus Investigator for the MacDiarmid Institute for Advanced Materials and Nanotechnology. She was awarded the Royal Society Te Apārangi Pickering Medal in 2019. She has a strong focus on teaching, mentoring and public outreach and is an outspoken advocate for issues of gender equality and ethics in science.

== Childhood and early life ==
The daughter of a United States military officer stationed in Frankfurt, Simpson was born in Germany. Her family moved to the US and back 16 more times before she finished high school. She attributes her adaptability as an adult to this experience. Simpson's mother had majored in art history at university and her father in English. There were no scientists in her family. As a smart student she was encouraged to study Latin and literature and pursue medicine or law.

== Research career ==
=== University studies and postgraduate research ===
In 1983 Simpson gained a prestigious Echols scholarship at the University of Virginia, a unique undergraduate programme that encourages freedom of inquiry and critical thought. Her initial intention was to study medicine but the academic flexibility of the Echols programme allowed her to take a variety of subjects including history, civilisation and literature. As a first-year student she took an advanced biology course and was invited by her instructor Professor Richard Rodewald, to work in his cell biology lab over the summer. Professor Rodewald became her first science mentor and her experience in his lab convinced her to become a scientist. She investigated how new-born rats pull immuno-globulins out of their mother's milk and into their bloodstream, learning to design and test experiments and use equipment like electron microscopes. She graduated with a B.A. in Interdisciplinary Studies in 1986.

Simpson did her PhD in Medical Sciences at the University of New Mexico School of Medicine as a Howard Hughes Predoctoral Fellow. She began her PhD research in cell biology on allergy-related receptors. She was in a MD/ Ph.D. programme investigating how molecules like histamine and serotonin get released from immune cells when they encounter ragweed and how the cytoskeleton of cells change shape during allergic reactions. Part way through her PhD studies Simpson moved from the medical school to a spectroscopy lab in the chemistry department at the University of New Mexico, shifting research focus and group. She gives two reasons for this shift. Firstly she says she needed to learn more about the mathematical aspects of physical chemistry to understand the problems in cell biology. Secondly she says she initially organised a three-month hiatus in the physical chemistry department to avoid the fallout of a controversy. During this time she got involved in laser spectroscopy to investigate the interactions between light and molecules. She planned to return to the medical school and join a new group after the three months but was so captivated by this topic that she never returned.

The focus of the remainder of her PhD research was the ultrafast vibrational dynamics of heme proteins, the oxygen-carrying molecules in blood. She developed a method to study the way molecules respond to light during the first picosecond after they are hit by a laser. She likens the method to stop-motion photography. First, you hit a molecule with a short, sharp laser pulse of light. Then, you take a series of spectroscopic “snapshots” to see what the molecule is doing with the energy it absorbs from the laser. Using this method she discovered that the heme molecules in blood absorb light and convert it into vibrations, essentially molecular-scale heat. She received her Ph.D. in Medical Sciences with a focus on the ultrafast vibrational dynamics of heme proteins in 1994. Understanding how molecules convert light into different forms has been the focus of Simpson's research ever since.

=== Early career research ===
After a Department of Energy Distinguished Postdoctoral Fellowship at Sandia National Laboratories in Albuquerque, Simpson took a tenure-track position in the Chemistry Department at Case Western Reserve University in 1997. There she set up a laser lab to study ultrafast energy conversion in molecules. Along with her colleague Professor Mary Barkley, Simpson was one of the first two women hired in the Chemistry Department. She was promoted to Associate Professor and started the Center for Chemical Dynamics. She ran a successful research programme that was supported by the NIH, NSF and the US Department of Defence. Her studies directly impacted phototherapeutics, molecular- and nano-scale electronic components, and unraveling the fundamental behaviour of photoactive systems. Simpson also directed the Case Chemistry Scholars Program, and was a 1999–2000 Glennan Fellow. Alongside her laser research, she fostered innovation in undergraduate teaching, women in science, and ethics in education and research.

In 2007 Simpson emigrated to New Zealand where she became a professor of physics and chemical sciences at the University of Auckland. According to Simpson, the dean of science made her an attractive job offer which made the move a win-win. After moving to New Zealand Simpson's focus shifted from fundamental blue-skies research to more applied commercial work. The initial motivation for this shift was the need to raise money for the expensive lasers needed for her research but she soon became convinced of the wider value of applied and commercial research for society. In 2015, Simpson co-founded the Science Scholars Program at the University of Auckland, along with Richard Easther and David Edward Williams.

=== The photon factory and research at the University of Auckland ===
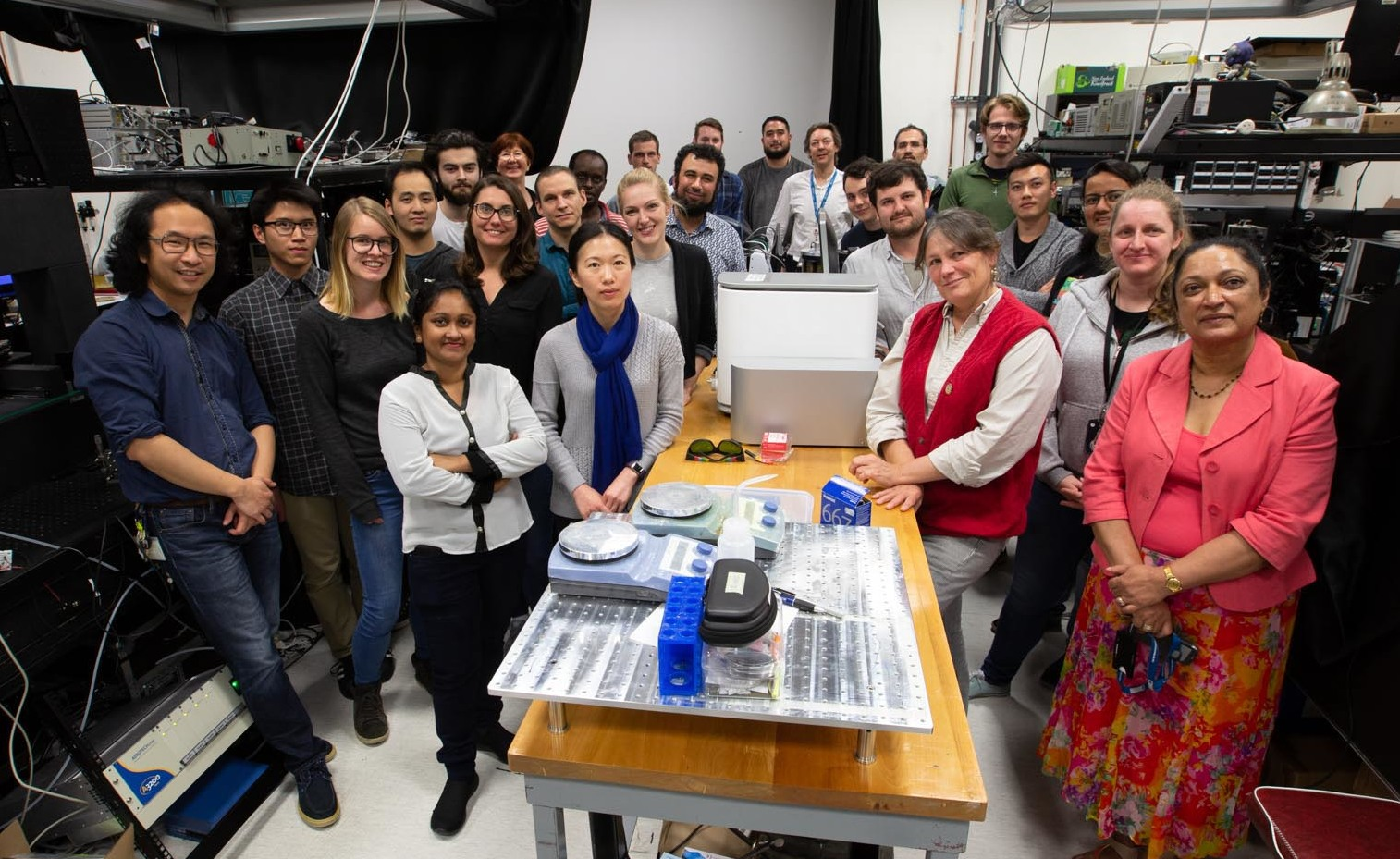
Cather Simpson and other researchers, students, and staff in the Photon Factory

In 2010 Simpson founded the Photon Factory, a multi-user laser research facility at the University of Auckland. The photon factory's core mission is to enable the research of all New Zealand scientists – academic, industrial, government and student-led – through the advanced use of laser pulses to interrogate light–matter interactions and to manipulate and machine materials. Cather has taken a strong interest in the role of universities in sparking innovation and economic benefit and her aim has been to transform the Photon Factory from a university research lab into a high-impact “innovation hub." The photon factory's cross disciplinary team of academics, postdoctoral researchers, postgraduate and undergraduate students in physics, chemistry, engineering and biology work in fluid teams to solve fundamental, applied and entrepreneurial research problems. Their research has covered a broad research portfolio, from fundamental chemical physics through to applied photonics. Collaboration with industry is key to funding the operation.

The Photon factory's research specialises in using extremely short (femtosecond) laser pulses to solve both fundamental and applied problems. These include micro-machining and micro-fabrication (cutting, making and shaping materials) as well as probing molecules in the millions of billionths of seconds after absorbing light. They are the first in the world to demonstrate spatial and temporal control over the 'shapes' of ultrashort laser pulses, and to use those pulses in varied applications. They have made advances in bone surgery and air-quality sensor chips. They have also studied how pigments fade in art, investigated light-based cancer cures, developed a handheld device for diagnosing suspicious skin lesions and explored basic laser–material interactions. Simpson led the research team from 2010 till 2019 when she stepped down as director of the Photon Factory to focus on her commercial roles.

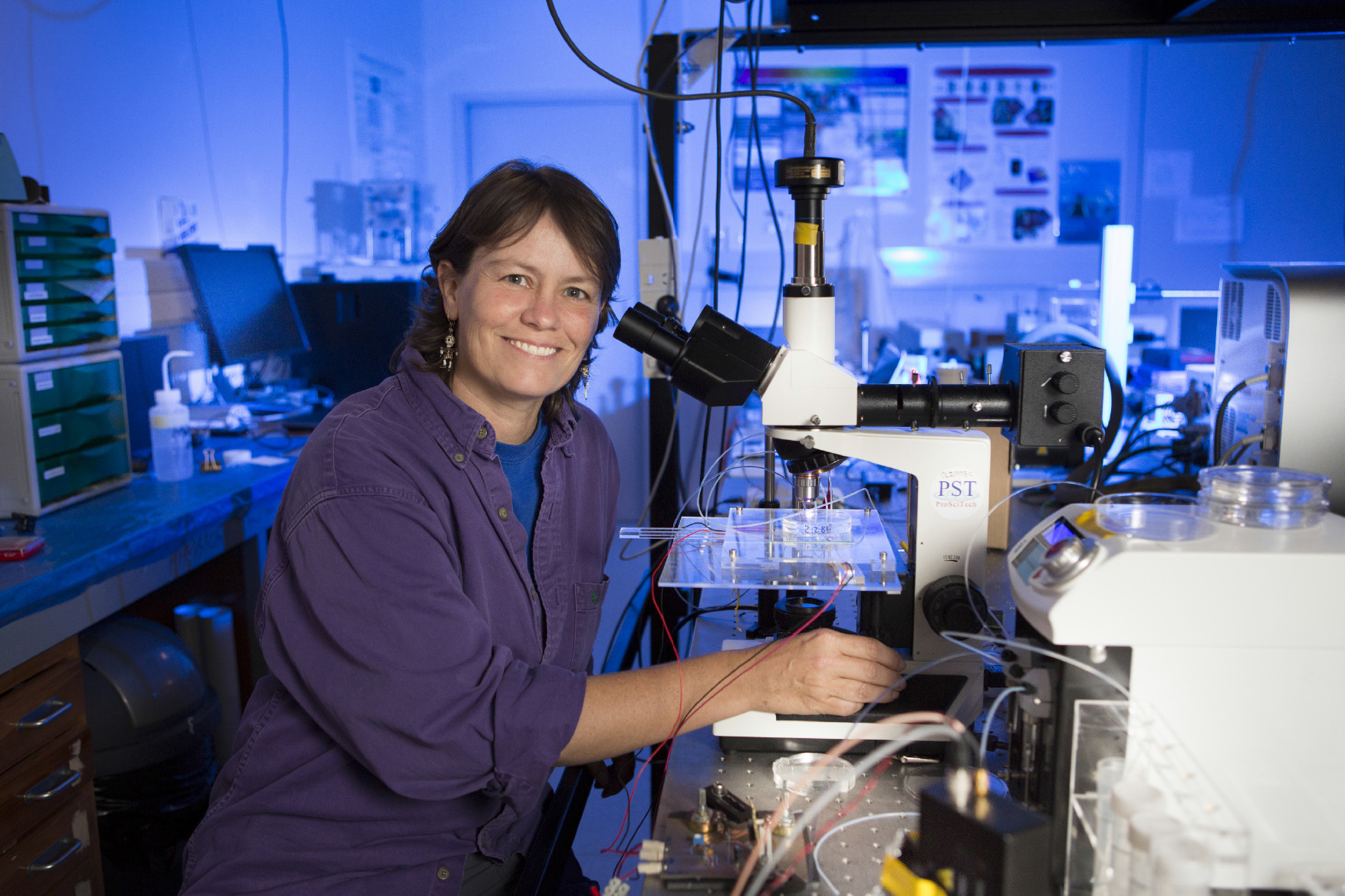
Simpson working in the Photon Factory in 2013

Simpson's work is internationally recognised for providing insight into how molecules and materials convert light into more useful types of energy, and applying this knowledge in areas such as sperm sorting for the dairy industry. Simpson and her students use ultrafast laser spectroscopy to study rapidly evolving molecules as they convert light to more useful forms of energy.

Simpson has won national and international awards for her research and associated spin-off companies, including being the first woman named Supreme Winner at the Kiwinet Researcher Commercialisation Awards in 2016 and being awarded the Royal Society of New Zealand's Pickering Medal in 2019. She was elected Fellow of the Royal Society of New Zealand in 2018 and the New Zealand Institute of Chemistry in 2016 and is a past President of the New Zealand Institute of Physics. In 2023, she was elected Fellow of the SPIE (the International Society for Optics and Photonics). She is an Associate Investigator for and has taken leadership roles in the Dodd-Walls Centre for Photonic and Quantum Technologies and she is an emeritus investigator for the MacDiarmid Institute for Advanced Materials and Nanotechnology, two national Centres of Research Excellence (CoREs) in New Zealand. She has also been elected to the Commission on Laser Physics and Photonics for the International Union of Pure and Applied Physics. She is an active member of SPIE, having served on its Board of Directors from 2021-2023, presented at several conferences and served on conference committees.

== Agtech ==
Simpson has a strong interest in using photonics and light-based technologies to make agriculture more efficient and sustainable. She has given international talks and written articles on this topic and in 2016 hosted a delegation of top level Chinese government officials interested in improving productivity and health in the agricultural sector to the Photon Factory. She has founded two spin-off companies in the Agtech sector based on research done at the Photon Factory.

=== Engender Technologies ===
Simpson's first spin-off company is Engender Technologies. She cofounded the company in 2011 by Simpson with seed investment firm Pacific Channel and support of the University of Auckland's commercialisation company UniServices. Engender has developed a new technique to efficiently sort bull sperm by sex, which aims to give farmers greater genetic control over their herds and reduce the number of bobby calves that need to be killed. The technique uses lasers to “nudge” sperm cells between channels “the size of a human hair” on microfluidic chips. The process separates X (female) and Y (male) bearing bull sperm cells and therefore enables selection by sex. In 2016 Engender won the Agtech category of the Silicon Valley Forum Tech World Cup competition, the first ever win by an Australasian company. In November 2018 the company was bought by multi-national genetics company CRV-Ambreed, the New Zealand offshoot of Dutch co-operative CRV. Simpson is now employed full time by CRV-Ambreed to continue development in New Zealand.

=== Orbis Diagnostics and COVID19 ===
As the founder director, Simpson serves on the board of her second spin-off company is Orbis Diagnostics, which initially attracted seed investment to develop technology that analyses milk composition in the milking shed at "point of cow." This technology consists of a CD-sized disk and uses advanced laser technology to measure fat, protein, progesterone and other relevant compounds with the aim of informing farmers of the cow's health, reproductive and nutritional status. The initial proof-of-concept research was done with seed-funding from The University of Auckland's commercialisation company UniServices and the company was formed with a new round of investment through seed investment firm Pacific Channel.

Following the COVID-19 outbreak, Orbis Diagnostics have shifted focus to adapt their "lab-on-a-disk" technology to detect COVID-19 antibodies. Their aim is to develop a robust and disposable microfluidic disk that offers tests of medical laboratory precision in a time-sensitive manner at points-of-need in the community. The test would be based on a finger prick of blood. The technology will detect whether a person has immunity to the virus, not whether they are currently infected. This would enable the identification of individuals whose immune status should allow them to move safely in society without risk. The company have raised NZ$5.2million funding for the development.

== Science outreach, teaching, and mentoring ==
From early in her career Simpson has emphasised the people-side of science and focused strongly on teaching, mentoring, ethics and public communication. At Case Western Reserve University she fostered innovation in undergraduate teaching, women in science, and ethics in education and research. She was acknowledged by the CWRU Mortar Board Society who awarded her the "Top Prof" award. At The University of Auckland has taught over 1200 science and non-science majors each year including large undergraduate courses and classes in the English Department linking physics and poetry. In 2013 Simpson won a national award in New Zealand for sustained excellence in tertiary teaching. She was commended for her use of innovative teaching and mentoring approaches that encourage students to be independent and self-motivated. These include large group methods to promote critical thinking such as 'Convince your neighbour' and 'Problem of the Day' group exercises. According to the award write-up students respond well with excellent student evaluations and outcomes. Undergraduate science and engineering students are encouraged to carry out cutting-edge research in the Photon Factory.

From her postgraduate years till now Simpson has advocated publicly on issues of ethics and gender bias in science. She takes a strong interest in how photonics and light-based technologies can be used to address sustainability and social justice issues such as Global climate change, clean drinking water, sustainable energy. In October 2019 she signed a public letter against racism on campus at the University of Auckland.

Simpson is a public advocate for diversity in science. She was one of the first two female chemists hired in the Chemistry Department at Case Western Reserve University and became involved in a US programme called ACES (Academic Careers in Engineering & Science) which aimed to achieve full participation of women at all levels of faculty and academic leadership in the science and engineering workforce. She says it was the ACES programme that helped us to recognise the gender bias and gave academic staff the tools to combat it. She has since applied these lessons to her leadership roles in New Zealand. She has also worked to encourage Māori and Pasifika to consider careers in science.

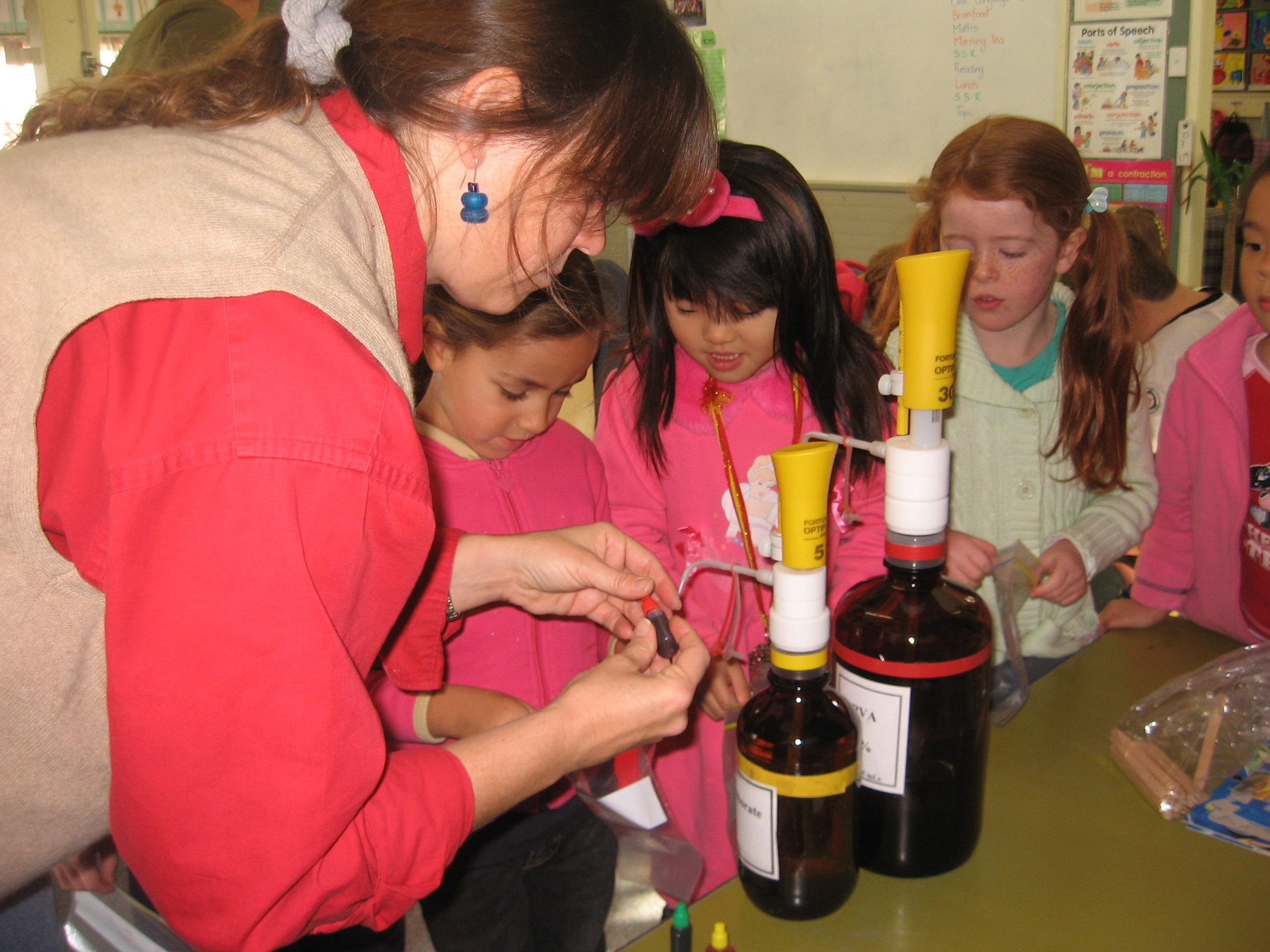
Simpson doing science experiments with girls at Northcote Primary School

Since 2015 public outreach has been one of the core missions of the Photon Factory. The Photon Factory's coordinated outreach efforts got started in 2015 when Simpson took the position of co-chair of the New Zealand International Year of Light Committee. This celebration sought to raise awareness of the importance of light and light-based technologies in all facets of our lives—whether economic or artistic or scientific. Simpson and her team got funding from the New Zealand government under the Unlocking Curious Minds program. As part of the event Simpson's team ran art competitions, had a logo competition and engaged with the indigenous (Māori) community, to come up with a translation of “International Year of Light.” They ran outreach activities at eight museums across New Zealand and created low-cost take-home optics kits for children containing light-related hands-on experiments that were made available to tens of thousands of New Zealand children and youth. These activities ranged from fluorescent bacteria to edible optics, and the box itself acted as a spectroscope with interactive experiments. Since 2015 Simpson and her team have actively engaged with schools and communities in Auckland and rural New Zealand.

As a keynote and plenary speaker Simpson has spoken on the topics of gender bias in science, innovation, education, science outreach and photonics for sustainable farming. Her public talks have included a TEDx talk and two 2019 public lectures hosted by the Perimeter Institute for Theoretical Physics; one on the topic of “Farms, Food and Photonics” and the other for high-school students on the topic of "Inspiring Future Women in Science" for International Women's Day.

Simpson is the chair of the Commission on Laser Physics and Photonics (C17) of the International Union of Pure and Applied Physics for the period 2025 to 2027 and in this capacity she is also member of the Executive Council.

== Awards and honours ==
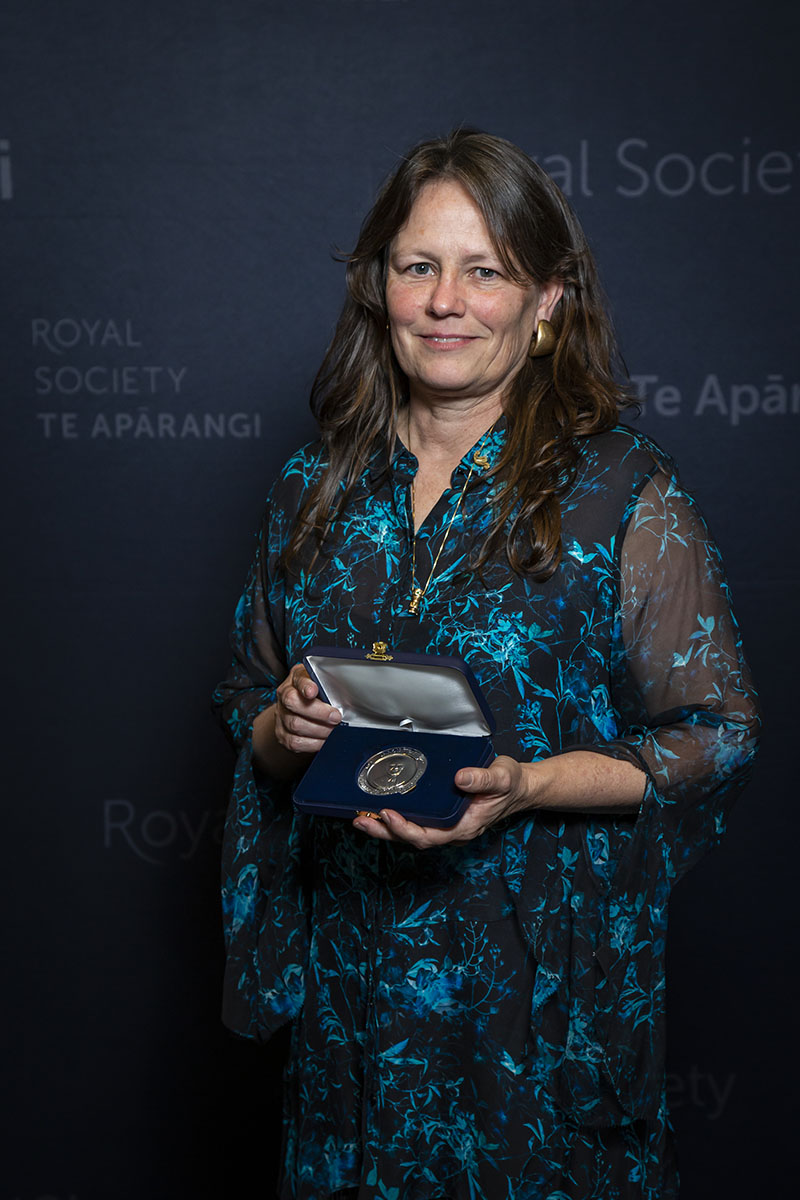
Simpson being awarded the Pickering Medal at the 2019 Research Honours Aotearoa

- 1983–1986 Echols Scholar at the University of Virginia (USA)
- 1989–1994 Howard Hughes Predoctoral Fellow (USA)
- 1994–1996 Department of Energy Distinguished Postdoctoral Research Fellow (USA)
- 1998 “Top Prof” Award, CWRU Mortar Board Society, Case Western Reserve University (USA)
- 1999–2000 Glennan Fellow Award for Young Teacher Scholars, Case Western Reserve University (USA)
- 1998–2004 F.I.R.S.T Award (R29), National Institutes of Health (USA)
- 2012 The University of Auckland Sustained Excellence in Teaching Award (NZ)
- 2013 Award for Sustained Excellence in Tertiary Teaching, Ako Aotearoa, National Centre for Tertiary Teaching Excellence (NZ)
- 2016 KiwiNet Baldwins Researcher Entrepreneur Award
- 2016 KiwiNet BNZ Supreme Award for overall excellence in all core areas of research commercialisation (Simpson was the first woman to win this award)
- 2016 Elected Fellow of the New Zealand Institute of Chemistry
- 2016 Silicon Valley Forum World Cup Tech Challenge 2016 (Simpson's company Engender was the Agtech Winner)
- 2017 Selected by the Royal Society Te Apārangi as one of their 150 women in 150 words.
- 2018 Elected a Fellow of the Royal Society Te Apārangi
- 2018 SPIE Startup Challenge 3rd Place for Simpson's company Orbis Diagnostics
- 2019 Royal Society Te Apārangi Pickering Medal for "her pioneering research and commercialisation of innovative photonic technologies, addressing challenges with a New Zealand focus and global impact"
- 2023 Elected Fellow of SPIE

== Selected works ==
- Jentzen, W.; Simpson, M. C.; Hobbs, J. D.; Song, X.; Ema, T.; Nelson, N. Y.; Medforth, C. J.; Smith, K. M.; Veyrat, M.; Mazzanti, M.; Ramasseul, R.; Marchon, J.-C.; Takeuchi, T.; Goddard, W. A.; Shelnutt, J. A. (1995). "Ruffling in a Series of Nickel(II) meso-Tetrasubstituted Porphyrins as a Model for the Conserved Ruffling of the Heme of Cytochromes C". Journal of the American Chemical Society. 117 (45): 11085–11097. Bibcode:1995JAChS.11711085J. doi:10.1021/ja00150a008. PMID 27275517.
- Drain, Charles Michael; Gentemann, Steve; Roberts, James A.; Nelson, Nora Y.; Medforth, Craig J.; Jia, Songling; Simpson, M. Cather; Smith, Kevin M.; Fajer, Jack; Shelnutt, John A.; Holten, Dewey (1998). "Picosecond to Microsecond Photodynamics of a Nonplanar Nickel Porphyrin: Solvent Dielectric and Temperature Effects". Journal of the American Chemical Society. 120 (15): 3781–3791. Bibcode:1998JAChS.120.3781D. doi:10.1021/ja974101h.
- Shah, Shashin; Simpson, M. Cather; Smith, Rhett C.; Protasiewicz, John D. (2001). "Three Different Fates for Phosphinidenes Generated by Photocleavage of Phospha-Wittig Reagents ArPPMe3". Journal of the American Chemical Society. 123 (28): 6925–6926. Bibcode:2001JAChS.123.6925S. doi:10.1021/ja015767l. PMID 11448199.
- Shreve, Andrew P.; Franzen, Stefan; Simpson, M. Cather; Dyer, R. Brian (1999). "Dependence of NO Recombination Dynamics in Horse Myoglobin on Solution Glycerol Content". The Journal of Physical Chemistry B. 103 (37): 7969–7975. doi:10.1021/jp991163g. S2CID 55763536.
