= Frédérique Vanholsbeeck =

Belgian-New Zealand physicist

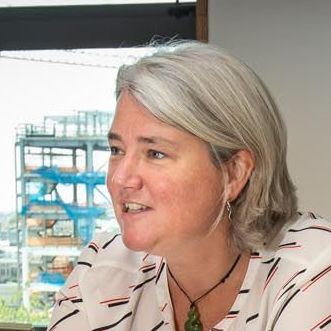
- Born: 20th-century Belgium
- Awards: Hill Tinsley Medal

Academic background
- Education: Université libre de Bruxelles, Institut Supérieur d'Architecture Intercommunal Victor Horta

Frédérique Vanholsbeeck (also Frederique Vanholsbeeck) is a New Zealand physicist, and is a full professor at the University of Auckland, specialising in optics and biophotonics, the physics of light.

== Academic career ==
Vanholsbeeck initially trained as an architect before studying physics. She won the 2001 prize for the best Master's thesis from the Belgian Physical Society. She completed a PhD at the Université libre de Bruxelles, working on non-linear optical phenomena of light. After a year as a postdoctoral researcher at the University of Auckland, Vanholsbeek joined the faculty in 2005, rising to full professor in 2023. When she was appointed at Auckland, Vanholsbeeck was the only woman academic in the department. She subsequently promoted the use of new processes for hiring staff, and selecting award recipients and speakers to reduce bias, and chaired the equity committee. As a result of these efforts, the Physics Department was awarded Bronze Level Pleiades certification by the Inclusions, Diversity and Equity in Astronomy initiative of the Astronomical Society of Australia, and has subsequently achieved Silver Level.

Vanholsbeeck's has investigated the use of quantitative fluorescence spectroscopy to monitor bacterial viability and thus the efficiency of antibiotics. She developed the "optrode", a portable, cheap and real time fluorometer for use in food safety.

In April 2023, Vanholsbeeck was appointed as the director of the Dodd-Walls Centre.

Vanholsbeeck is an active mentor of younger physicists. She has advocated for gender and ethnicity quotas in science funding, arguing that they are needed to counter the fact that many people only mentor people who look like them. Such quotas are already in use in Australia, for instance the National Health and Medical Research Council requires half of mid-career and senior investigator grants to be awarded to women and non-binary applicants.

== Honours and awards ==
In 2017 Vanholsbeeck was highly commended for the New Zealand Association of Women in Science Miriam Dell Award. The same year she won the Dean’s Award for Sustained Excellence in Teaching.

She won the inaugural Optical Society of America Diversity and Inclusion Advocacy Recognition award in 2018.

Vanholsbeeck was awarded the New Zealand Association of Scientist's Hill Tinsley Medal 2020.

She was named as a 2025 Fellow of Optica.

== Selected works ==
- Robertson, Julia; Cushla McGoverin; Vanholsbeeck, Frederique; Simon Swift (2019). "Optimisation of the Protocol for the LIVE/DEAD® BacLightTM Bacterial Viability Kit for Rapid Determination of Bacterial Load". Frontiers in Microbiology. 10: 801. doi:10.3389/fmicb.2019.00801. PMC 6474257. PMID 31031741. Wikidata Q64118914.
- Vanholsbeeck, Frederique; Sonia Martin-Lopez; Miguel González-Herráez; Coen, Stéphane (2005). "The role of pump incoherence in continuous-wave supercontinuum generation". Optics Express. 13 (17): 6615–6625. doi:10.1364/opex.13.006615. PMID 19498676. Wikidata Q33461288.
- Norman Lippok; Coen, Stéphane; Poul Nielsen; Vanholsbeeck, Frederique (2012). "Dispersion compensation in Fourier domain optical coherence tomography using the fractional Fourier transform". Optics Express. 20 (21): 23398–23413. doi:10.1364/oe.20.023398. PMID 23188304. Wikidata Q51296047.
- Schröder, Jochen; Coen, Stéphane; Vanholsbeeck, Frederique; Sylvestre, Thibaut (2006). "Passively mode-locked Raman fiber laser with 100 GHz repetition rate". Optics Letters. 31 (23): 3489–3491. doi:10.1364/ol.31.003489. PMID 17099759. Wikidata Q30827982.
- B Dutrieue; Vanholsbeeck, Frederique; S Verbanck; M Paiva (2000). "A human acinar structure for simulation of realistic alveolar plateau slopes". Journal of Applied Physiology. 89 (5): 1859–1867. doi:10.1152/jappl.2000.89.5.1859. PMID 11053337. Wikidata Q52072128.
- A S Y Hsieh; Gordon K L Wong; S G Murdoch; Coen, Stéphane; Vanholsbeeck, Frederique; Leonhardt, Rainer; J D Harvey (2007). "Combined effect of Raman and parametric gain on single-pump parametric amplifiers". Optics Express. 15 (13): 8104–8114. doi:10.1364/oe.15.008104. PMID 19547137. Wikidata Q60398401.
- Vanholsbeeck, Frederique; Philippe Emplit; Coen, Stéphane (2003). "Complete experimental characterization of the influence of parametric four-wave mixing on stimulated Raman gain". Optics Letters. 28 (20): 1960–1962. doi:10.1364/ol.28.001960. PMID 14587789. Wikidata Q79230917.
