= James Fletcher Jnr =

New Zealand businessman

Sir James Fletcher ONZ
- Born: 25 December 1914; Dunedin, New Zealand
- Died: 29 August 2007 (aged 92); Auckland, New Zealand
- Occupations: Managing Director Fletcher Holdings 1942–1979; Chairman of Fletcher Holdings from 1979 to 1981; President and director of the Fletcher Challenge 1981–1990.
- Spouse: Vaughan Gunthorp
- Children: 3
- Relatives: James Fletcher (father); Hugh Fletcher (son); Sian Elias (daughter-in-law); Andrew Cameron (great-uncle)

Sir James Muir Cameron Fletcher ONZ (25 December 1914 – 29 August 2007), often known as Jim or JC Junior, was a New Zealand industrialist known for heading Fletcher Construction, one of the country's largest firms. His father, also Sir James Fletcher, founded the company in 1908.

== Early life and family ==
Fletcher was born in Dunedin, New Zealand, on Christmas Day 1914. He was James Senior's second son. In 1942, the year Fletcher Jnr became head of Fletcher Holdings, he married his office assistant, Margery Vaughan Gunthorp (born 9 February 1912 at Balclutha). She was treasurer of the Mental Health Foundation, and was appointed a Member of the Order of the British Empire in the 1988 Queen's Birthday Honours.

James and Vaughan Fletcher had three children: Jim, Angus, and Hugh Fletcher. Their eldest son Jim was killed by an intruder at his Bay of Plenty bach (holiday home) on New Year's Eve 1993. Angus married Christine Fletcher, former Minister of the Crown and Mayor of Auckland, and Hugh was the chief executive of Fletcher Challenge between 1987 and 1997.

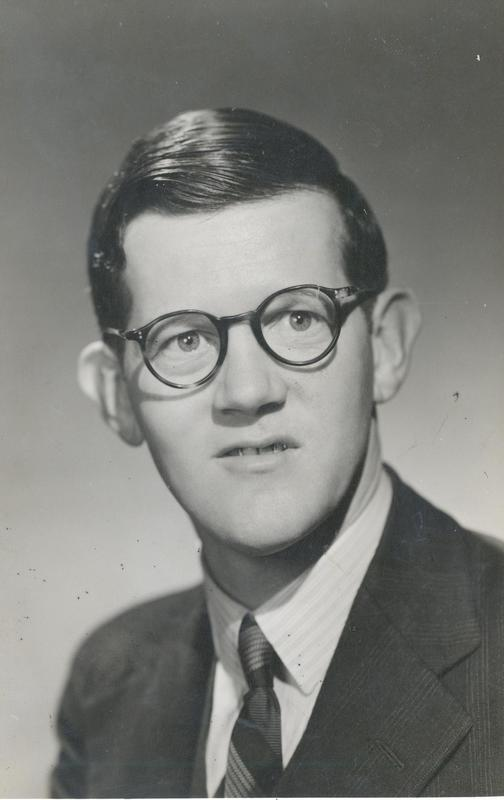
Sir James Fletcher, c.1941

== Fletcher Construction ==
In 1937, Fletcher joined his father's construction business. Following the election of the First Labour Government in 1935, Fletcher senior established an enduring friendship with the government, leading to Fletchers' building some of the first state houses in New Zealand. When Fletcher senior was seconded by the government in 1942, his son took over the running of Fletcher Holdings. At the time he was just 27 years old. Among his achievements was the forestry joint venture with the Holland National Government in the 1950s to build the Tasman Pulp and Paper Company mill at Kawerau. He was chairman of Fletcher Holdings from 1972 to 1981 and was president of the new Fletcher Challenge conglomerate from 1981. He resigned as a director of the company in 1990.

== Honours and awards ==
In the 1980 New Year Honours, Fletcher was appointed a Knight Bachelor, for services to industry and the community. In the 1997 Queen's Birthday Honours, he was appointed a Member of the Order of New Zealand, the country's highest civilian honour. Also in 1997, Fletcher was inducted into the New Zealand Business Hall of Fame.

In the 1988 Queen's Birthday Honours, Fletcher's wife, Vaughan, Lady Fletcher, was appointed a Member of the Order of the British Empire, for services to the community.
