= Tenon Limited =

Defunct New Zealand company

- Company type: Public company
- Traded as: NZX: TEN
- Industry: Construction
- Founded: 2001 (split from Fletcher Challenge group)
- Defunct: 17 December 2017
- Headquarters: Auckland, New Zealand
- Number of locations: 15 offices
- Area served: New Zealand, United States
- Key people: Tony Johnston (Chief Operating Officer); Adam White (Chief Financial Officer); Paul Gillard (General Manager Corporate)
- Products: Building products
- Revenue: ▲NZ$740 million (As of 2007)
- Number of employees: 1300
- Divisions: Manufacturing and Distribution
- Website: www.tenonglobal.com

Tenon Limited was a New Zealand-based publicly traded company producing timber products. It was formerly known as Fletcher Forests which was split from the Fletcher Challenge group in 2001. The company's main business comprises supplying millwork building materials to the professional trade and DIY homeowners.

Rubicon Forests Limited were the major shareholder, controlling a majority 57.37% as at early 2008.

In 2013 it reported it was on the "cusp of profitability" for the first time since the US housing market collapse.

It was delisted from the New Zealand Stock Exchange on 5 July 2017 and put into liquidation in December 2017. Liquidation of the company was completed in December 2018. Liquidators' Final Report distributed 17 March 2020. Distribution to shareholders NZ$6,213,014.

== Operations ==
The company currently operates five plants, producing a variety of wood-based products:

- Taupo Sawmill (Taupō, New Zealand)
- Taupo Mouldings and Boards Plant (Taupō, New Zealand)
- Ornamental Mouldings Plant, High Point, North Carolina (2); Archdale, North Carolina)
- Stair Parts Plant (Ponder, Texas)

The company also operates six full-service millwork distribution facilities:

- Midwest Distribution (Zeeland, Michigan)
- Northeast Distribution (Allentown, Pennsylvania)
- Mid-Atlantic Distribution (Chesapeake, Virginia)
- Southeast Distribution (Lakeland, Florida)
- Southwest Home Center Distribution (Houston, Texas)
- Southwest Pro Dealer Distribution (Dallas, Texas)
