= Knox College, Otago =

Residential college in Dunedin, New Zealand

Coordinates: 45.855527°S 170.524238°E

Knox College
- University of Otago Residential College
- University of Otago
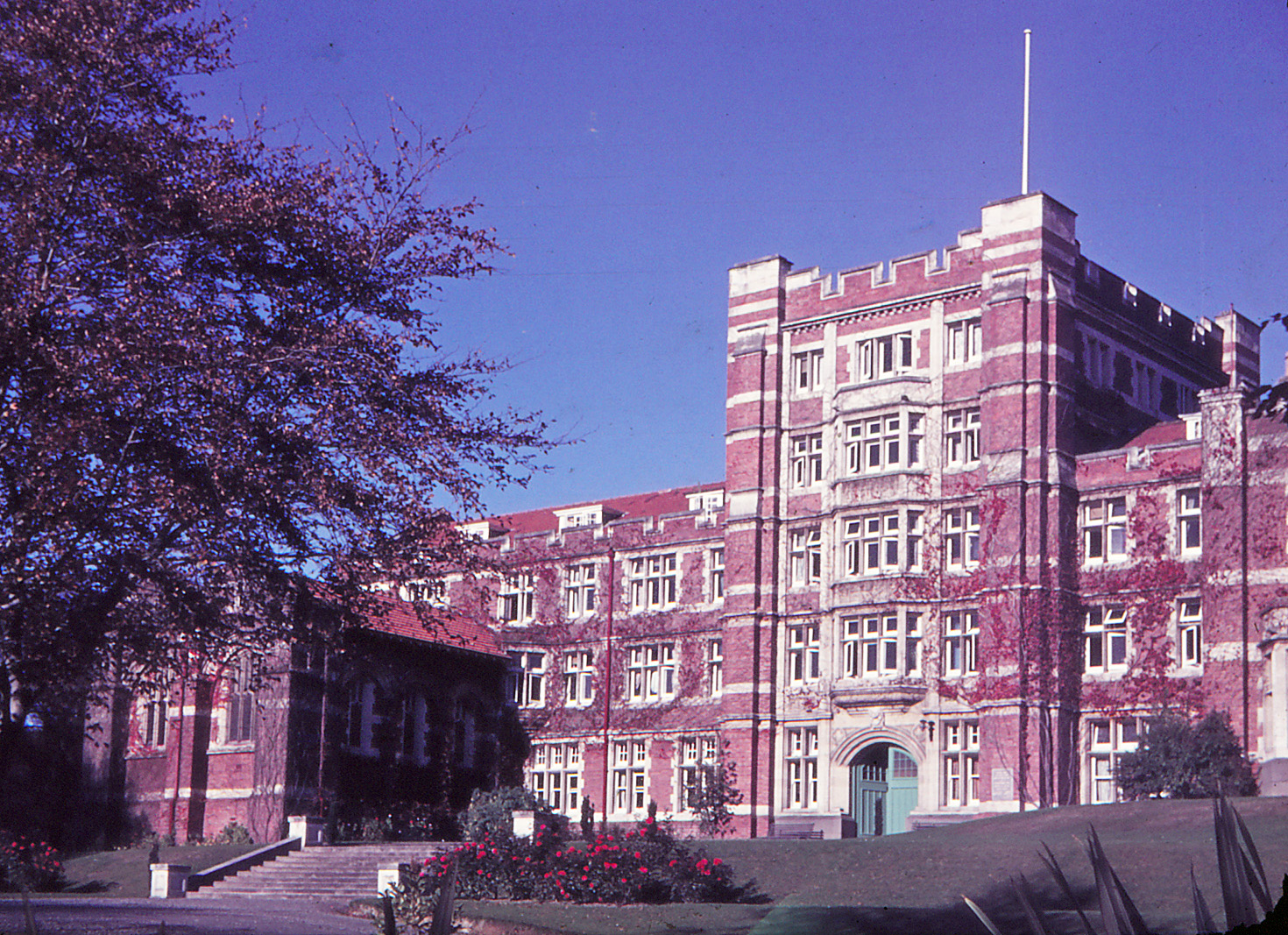
- Knox facade

- Knox College coat of arms
- Location: 9 Arden St, North East Valley, Dunedin
- Motto: Gratia et Veritas (Latin)
- Motto in English: Grace and Truth
- Founders: Rev Andrew Cameron and John Ross
- Established: 1909
- Status: Affiliated
- Head: Caroline Hepburn-Doole
- Knox Student President: Rory Connors
- Undergraduates: ~255
- Postgraduates: ~5
- Website: knoxcollege.ac.nz

Knox College is a residential college, founded and operated by the Presbyterian Church of Aotearoa New Zealand and affiliated with the University of Otago in Dunedin, New Zealand. The college is set in a 4.57 hectares (11.3 acres) landscaped site in Opoho on the opposite side of the Dunedin Botanic Gardens from the university.

As the second oldest residential college in New Zealand, Knox is also one of the more traditional colleges, having been founded in the mould of those at Oxbridge. Throughout the last century, Knox managed to maintain much of its distinctively collegiate institutional character while continually evolving to promote and maintain a welcoming and inclusive academic community for its student body, which has been co-educational since 1983. The college has produced 18 Rhodes Scholars, as well as several Gates Scholars and Fulbright Scholars.

== History and function ==
Knox College was established in 1909 to provide residence for male students and to house an existing seminary for Presbyterian ministers. It became co-educational in 1983. It also houses the Presbyterian Church's Knox Centre for Ministry and Leadership and the Presbyterian Research Centre (comprising the Hewitson Library and Presbyterian Archives). The college is named after John Knox, a sixteenth century leader of the Scottish Reformation, whose efforts in establishing a universal system of free education comprising both academic learning and character formation had a profound influence, not just in Scotland, but internationally, as subsequent generations of Scottish settlers, products of the Scottish Enlightenment, emigrated to far-flung corners of the globe, including New Zealand, taking with them a deep-seated belief in the benefits of applied knowledge and a broad and liberal education.

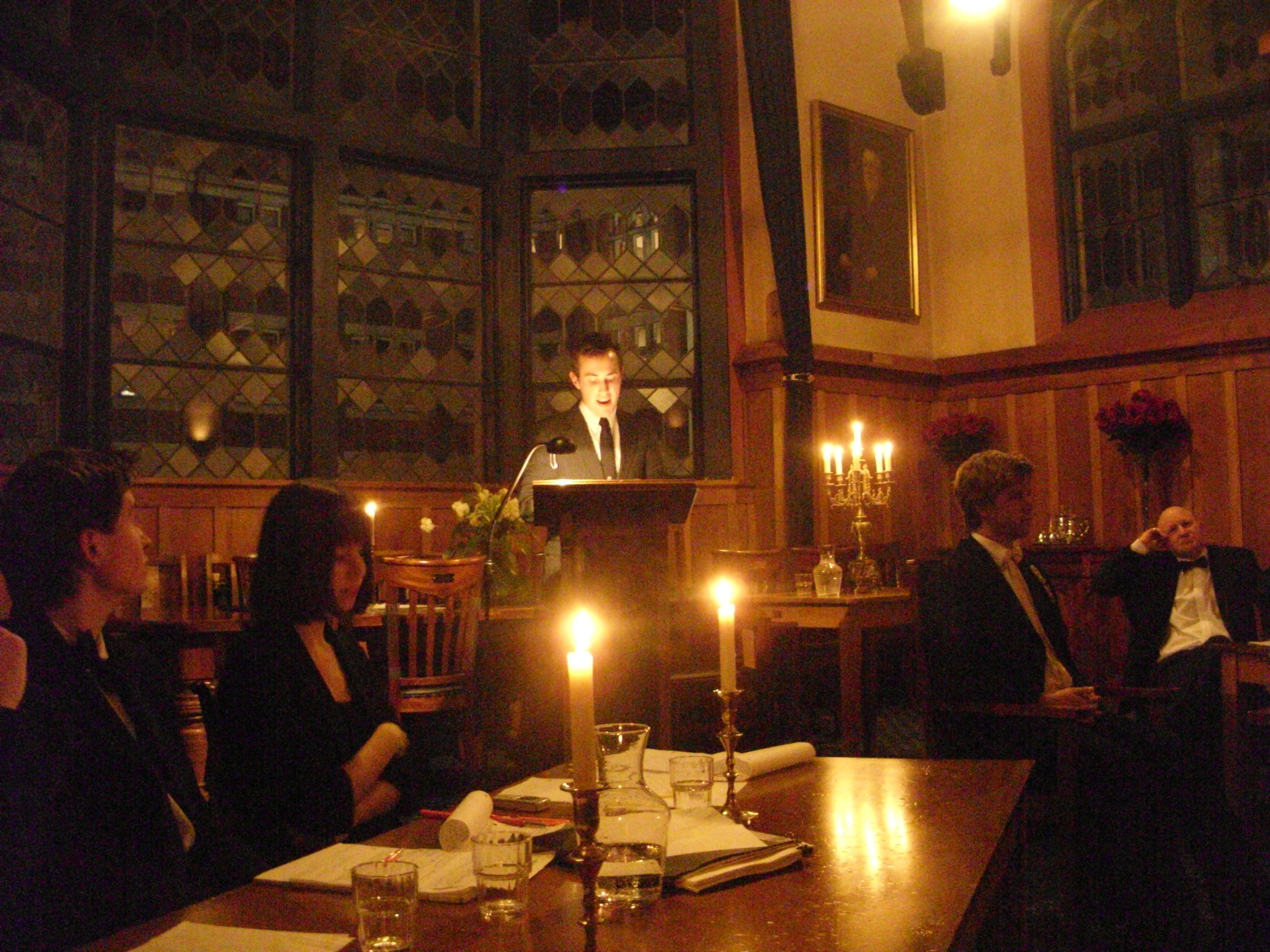
Master's Cup, 2009

Academic support for residents takes the form of tutorials, the monitoring of individual academic performances, and progress interviews as needed. In addition, the college benefits from an on-campus library, the Hewitson Library, which provides continuous access for students to study space and the library's various collections of books and journals, some of which are of historical significance. Knox College counts among its alumni eighteen Rhodes Scholars.

Upon entry into Knox College, undergraduate residents become part of the Junior Common Room (JCR), which is distinct from the Senior Common Room (SCR). The latter largely consists of post-graduates, (non-resident) academics, and leading figures within the academic and ecclesiastical the community who are elected as fellows on a quinquennial basis. The list of College Fellows currently includes both the Chancellor and the Vice-Chancellor of the University of Otago. Other members of the SCR include postgraduate students in residence, including the Ross Fellow, and the college's Sub-master team. The Ross Fellowship, established in 1920, is the oldest such award in the university.

Until the 1990s, certain Chairs in Theology were held at Knox College. These were disestablished when the University of Otago assumed responsibility (from the then Theological Hall) for teaching the university's Theology programme.

The Visitor is the Moderator of the Presbyterian Church of Aotearoa New Zealand.

== Knox College Students' Club ==
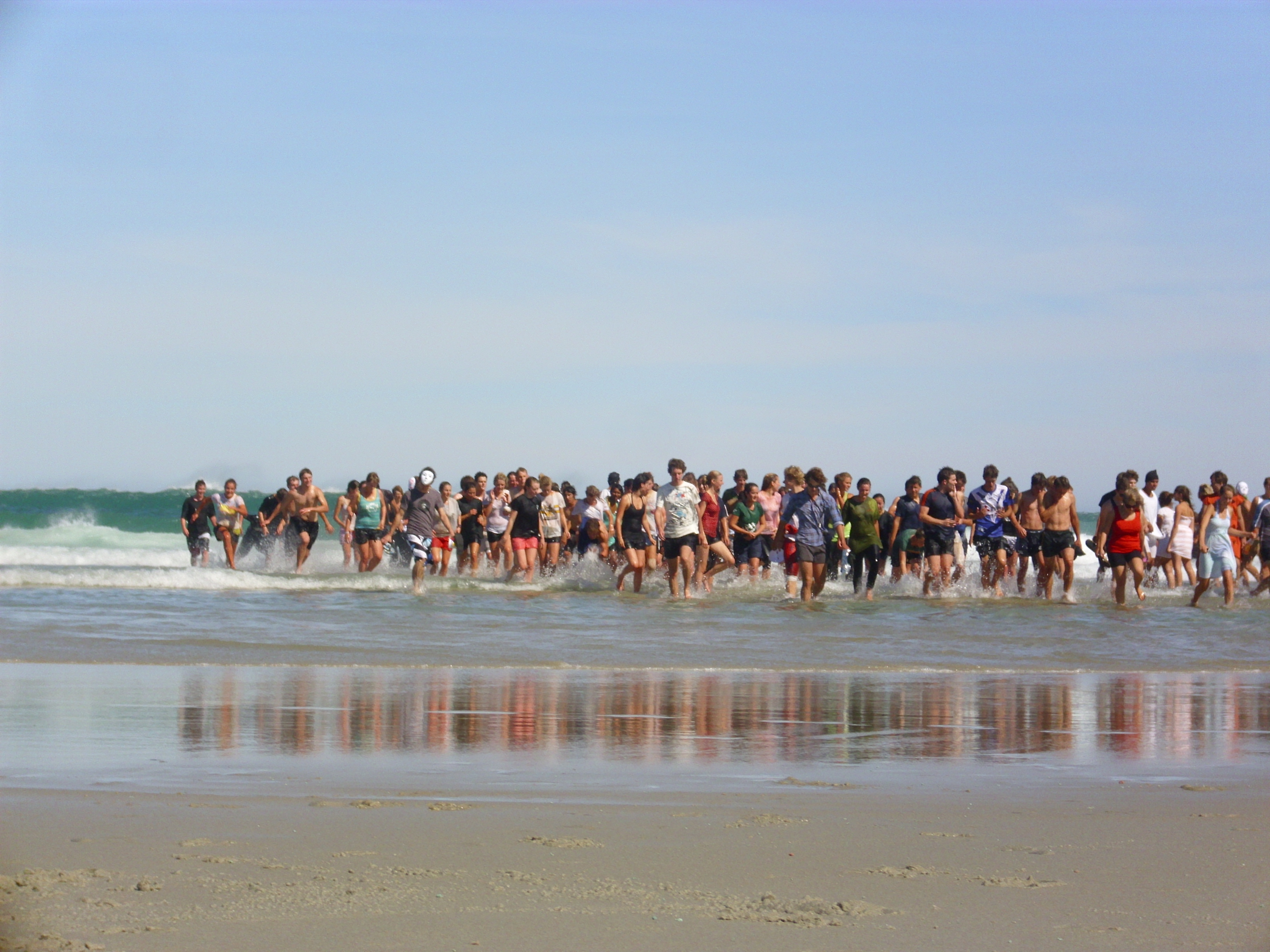
Student organised trip

The Knox College Students' Club (KCSC) was an incorporated society and was the oldest college organisation of its kind in New Zealand until it was dissolved in 2023. The majority of student social events and intercollegiate events were organised through the KCSC Executive Committee, or student nominated club members, and used to form a broad range of activities throughout the year, including the annual Ball held at Larnach Castle, the Concert on the Stairwell, and the various sporting and cultural events that compose the Cameron Shield and Nevill Cup competitions against Selwyn College. The KCSC Executive consisted of a president, vice president, secretary, treasurer, cultural representative, male and female sports representative, and social representative. These functions are now fulfilled by a team of student leaders in collaboration with College staff.

Three former presidents of the Students' Club later became masters of Knox College: the Rev Dr Hubert Ryburn (KCSC president, 1921), the Rev Peter Marshall (1962) and Mr. Bruce Aitken (1971). Other notable names on the list of KCSC presidents are Professor Sir David Skegg (1969), who later served as vice-chancellor of the university (2004–11), Judge E.O.K. Blaikie (1967), and Mr Joel Amosa (2009), winner of New Zealand's top singing prize, the Lexus Song Quest (2018).

A distinguishing characteristic of Knox, courtesy of it being independently owned, is the freedom it has to accept students back for a second, or even third, year. Students are not obliged to leave the college at the end of their first year. Returners play a role in setting the tone of the college, passing on traditions, and making incoming students feel welcome. In recent years, the male:female ratio has approximated 40:60, which is reflective of the male:female student ratio throughout the university.

=== Centennial celebrations ===
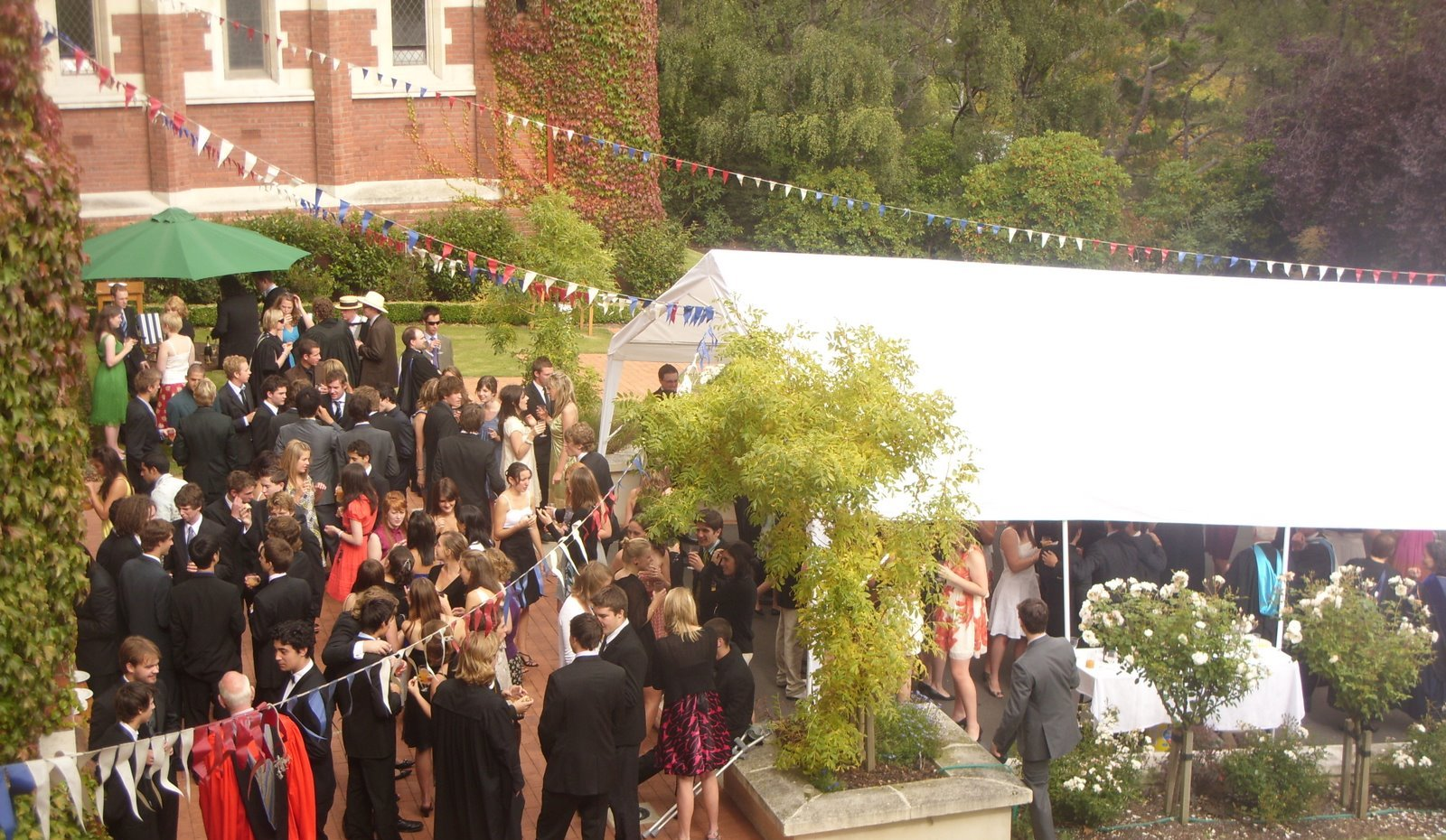
College Garden Party, 2009

The college achieved its centenary in 2009, with approximately 600 guests attending a variety of events over the celebration weekend in early August. The oldest returning resident (res. 1938–1943) planted a Centennial Oak in the college grounds to commemorate the occasion.

=== Dissolution ===
The KCSC as of 2024 was dissolved and replaced with student leadership roles. There is still a student president and vice-president although the dynamic is different to that of the KCSC role.

== Relationships with other colleges ==
Knox College shares its site with Salmond College. Although the two colleges are mostly autonomous in regards to their daily operations, they are governed by the same body, the Board of Knox College and Salmond College, and, being part of the same organisation, they share several staff, including a General Manager, a Food Services Manager, a Property Manager and a Groundsman.

Knox College enjoys a close relationship with its Anglican equivalent and arch-rival Selwyn College. The two colleges compete annually for the Nevill Cup (cultural events) and Cameron Shield (sporting events). The eighth Master of Knox College, the Very Rev Dr Graham Redding (2015–2021), was a former Warden of Selwyn College (1989–1991).

== Building history ==
The college buildings are an imposing group representing a persistent and successful effort to carry out an architectural idea over an extended time which saw considerable change.

=== Initial outlay ===
The Presbyterian Church of Otago and Southland opened a seminary for Ministers, its Theological Hall, in Dunedin in 1876. Early in the 20th century it acquired the core of the site in Opoho, above North East Valley, intending to re-house the seminary and to provide accommodation for its students and others attending the University of Otago. It established a brief and conducted an architectural competition won in 1906 by the 21-year old William Gray Young of Wellington. J. Louis Salmond (1868–1950) came second.

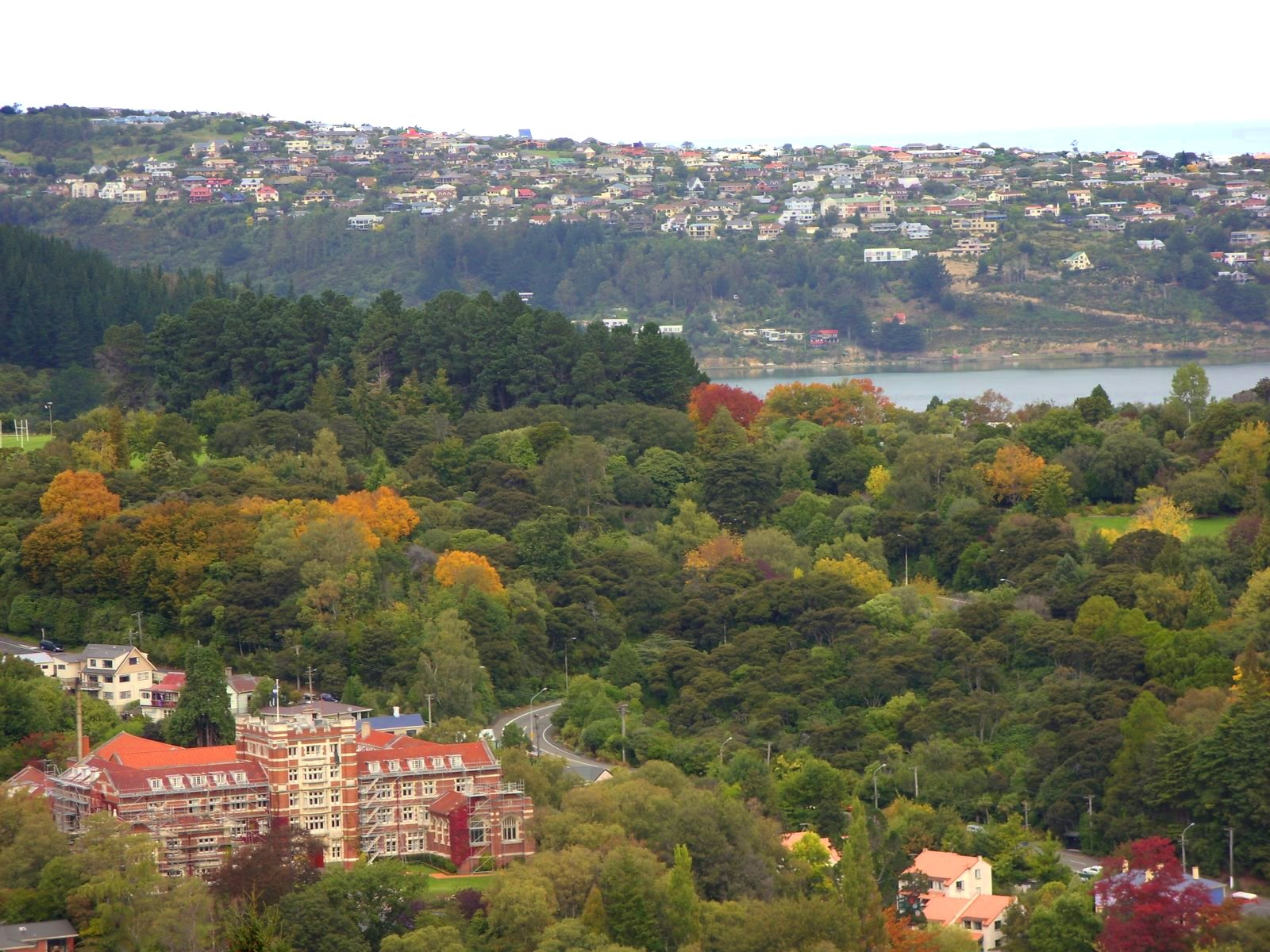
The Knox facade and Botanic Gardens

Young's plans envisaged development well beyond the college's immediate requirements taking the form of four ranges surrounding a central quadrangle. After the first stage was completed he was retained as architectural adviser and remained responsible for the buildings' design for more than forty years. His successors remained true to his conception through challenging circumstances.

The construction contract for the main accommodation block was won by Fletcher Brothers at a price of £9120. The chairman of the project was Rev Andrew Cameron and the contract winner was his son-in-law James Fletcher.

Because Young was based in Wellington and perhaps also because of his youth, Salmond was appointed supervising architect. The plan called for a principal range facing west with a large, square, central tower. It had subordinate ranges reaching forward at either extremity in a generally symmetrical composition. Behind the west range there were to be others at right angles to it, extending east, forming the north and south sides of the quadrangle.

The first building stage was the tower and the northward parts of the west range together with the range behind that trending east on the north side of the intended quadrangle (the "North Wing"). This part, the range on the north side of the quadrangle, included not only provision for teaching but a dining hall and servants' accommodation.

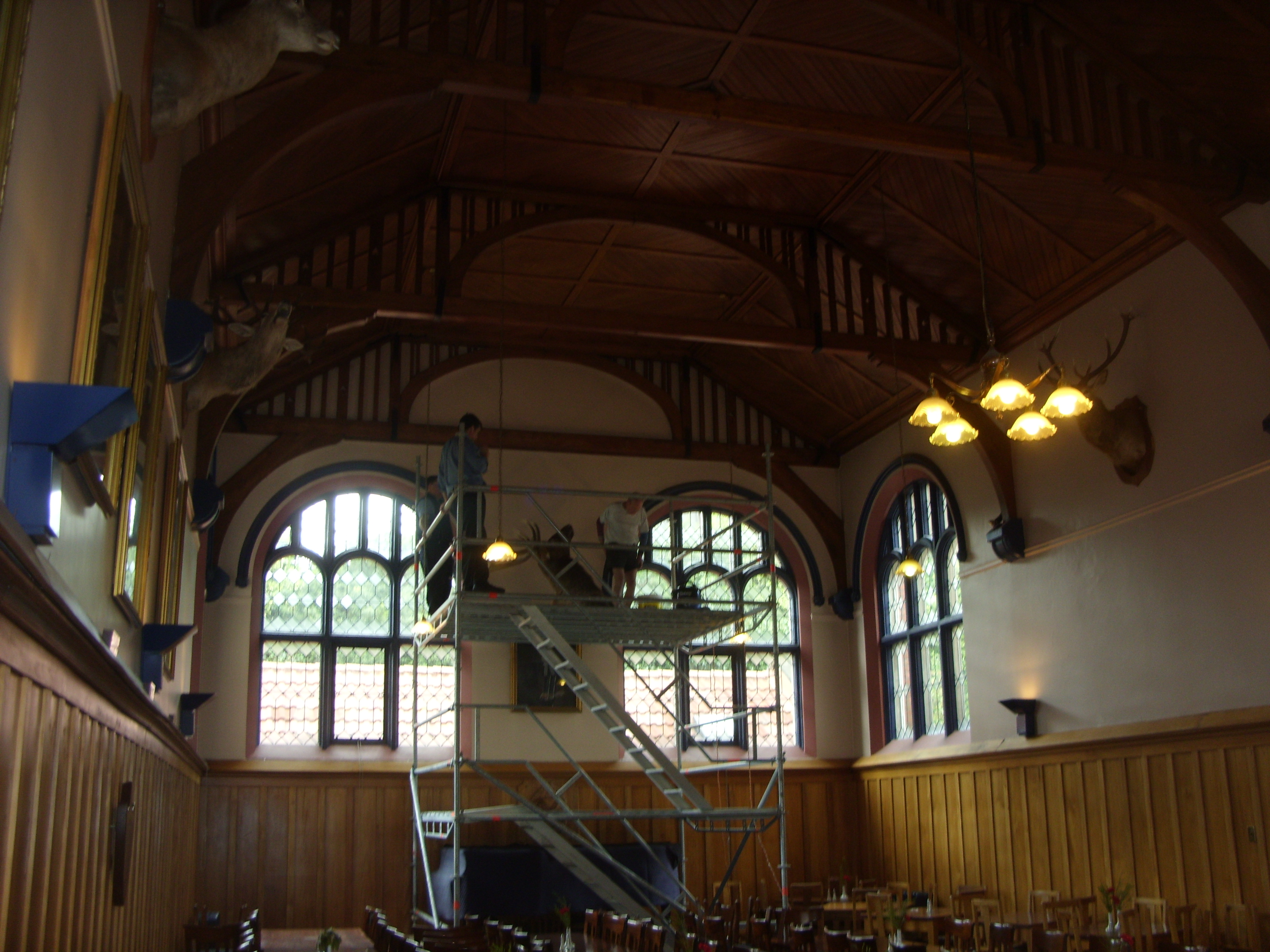
Elevation of a wapiti in the modern-day Great Hall

The foundation stone was laid on 6 April 1908 and the building was opened on 23 June 1909 having cost £19,307. The foundations were Port Chalmers breccia. The walls were finished in brick with Oamaru stone trims and the roofs were red clay tiles.

The building was in the Jacobethan style, a late form of the Gothic revival still vigorous in the early 20th century. Knox has the characteristic Tudor arches, oriel windows and battlements and the elaboration of forms and details, if not to the extent of Harlaxton Manor, sometimes pointed to as the type, or template, of the style.

=== Early development ===
The second stage was the southern part of the west range, including the forward projecting chapel. Behind this part of the west range the first part of the quadrangle's southern range was also to be built. A tender was accepted in September 1912 and completed by March 1914. Construction had cost £10,525.

On their elevated site, the buildings are highly visible. The council had insisted on raising the architect's four-storey tower to five storeys. The three-storey ranges and the forward-projecting subordinate sections present a complex but clearly defined exterior.

The interiors were spacious and finished with period detailing, including panels and hammer beams in the Dining Hall and stained glass and elaborate plasterwork, notably in the chapel. Even so, the college, as Young had conceived it, was far from complete.

Plans to extend the southern range, known as the "South Wing", were prepared by him in enough detail to be estimated by 1929 but the Depression and the Second World War prevented their execution. In 1952 with plans and funding almost complete the project was suspended.

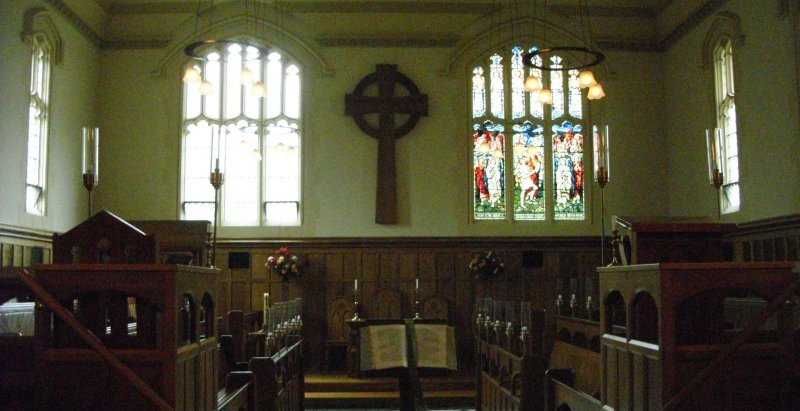
Ross Chapel

=== Post-war progress ===
Meanwhile, the combination of seminary and residential hall was proving difficult to accommodate in the existing space. In 1945 a fund was established to provide additional room. Young was getting old. He oversaw the drafting of the plans but advised the committee of his resignation in 1952. Salmond had died in 1950. His son, Arthur Salmond, (1906–1994) now in partnership with Harry Burt, took over the project. A contract was signed in 1953, building commenced the next year and the new Theological Hall was opened on 12 November 1955 for a cost of £80,000.

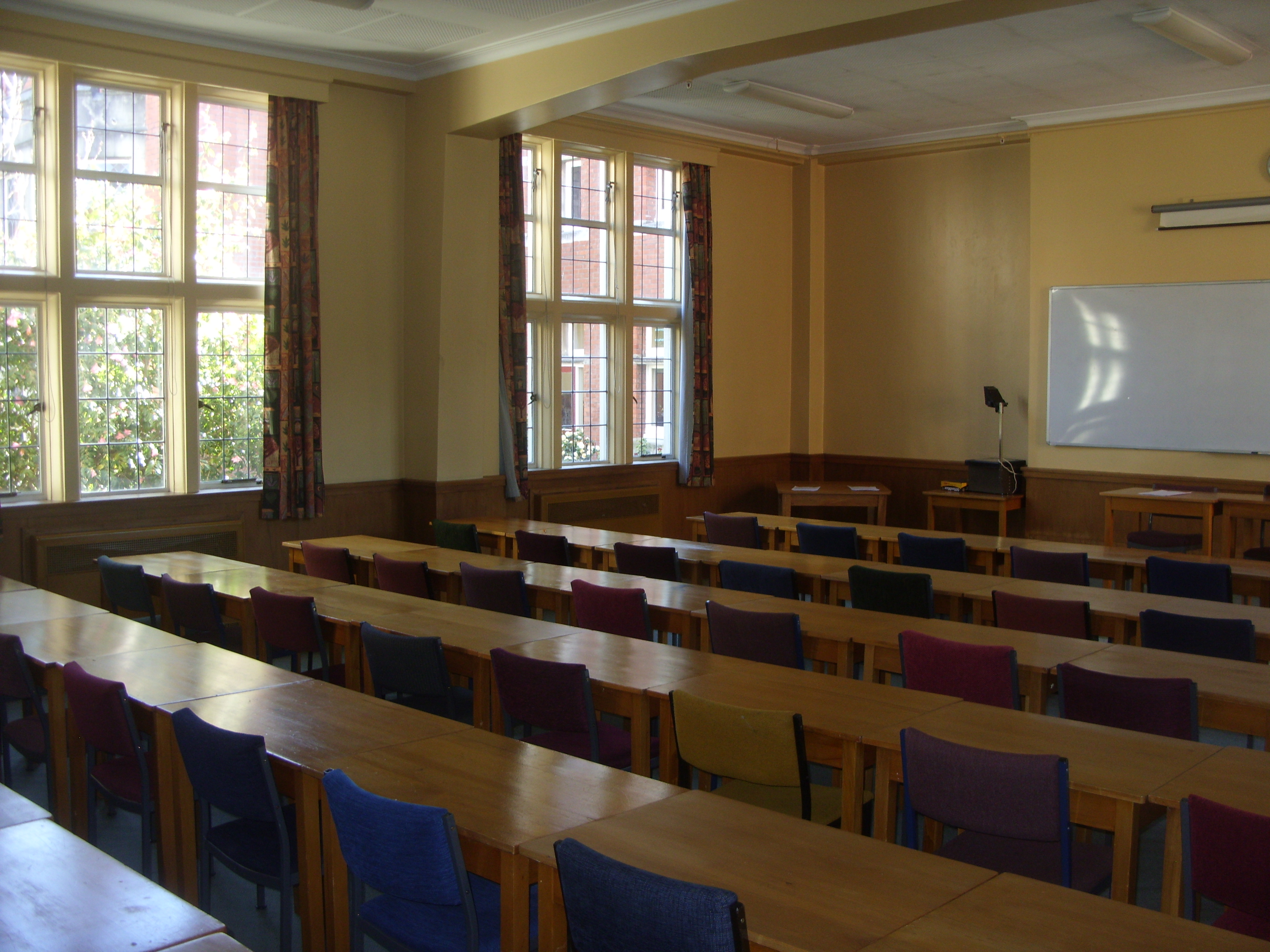
Tutorial room

The new building, to become known as the Hewitson Wing, was set parallel to the main west range, behind it, forming the east flank of the quadrangle. With a library as its front, facing the quadrangle, and with a hall behind, this structure is very deep. It is linked by an arch to the north range, closing the quadrangle's corner at that point.

Building methods and codes had changed. This structure, the first of the second building phase, incorporated reinforced concrete while retaining the forms and materials of the earlier buildings. It too is decorated inside in period fashion, the library, for example, managing to make the reference to an Elizabethan interior with a plausible degree of conviction.

The former provision for the Theological Hall in the north range was now made into additional accommodation for residents. This meant the Dining Hall was now too small for the numbers. That had been anticipated in the Gray Young era but in 1953 the council commissioned Salmond & Burt to prepare plans to extend the hall, estimated at £2,500. The work was completed by July 1957.

The extension reaches into the quadrangle courtyard, terminating in a crenellated bay window with stained lead lights. Inside it provides the space for the dais for the hall's high table and seems a natural enlargement of the room.

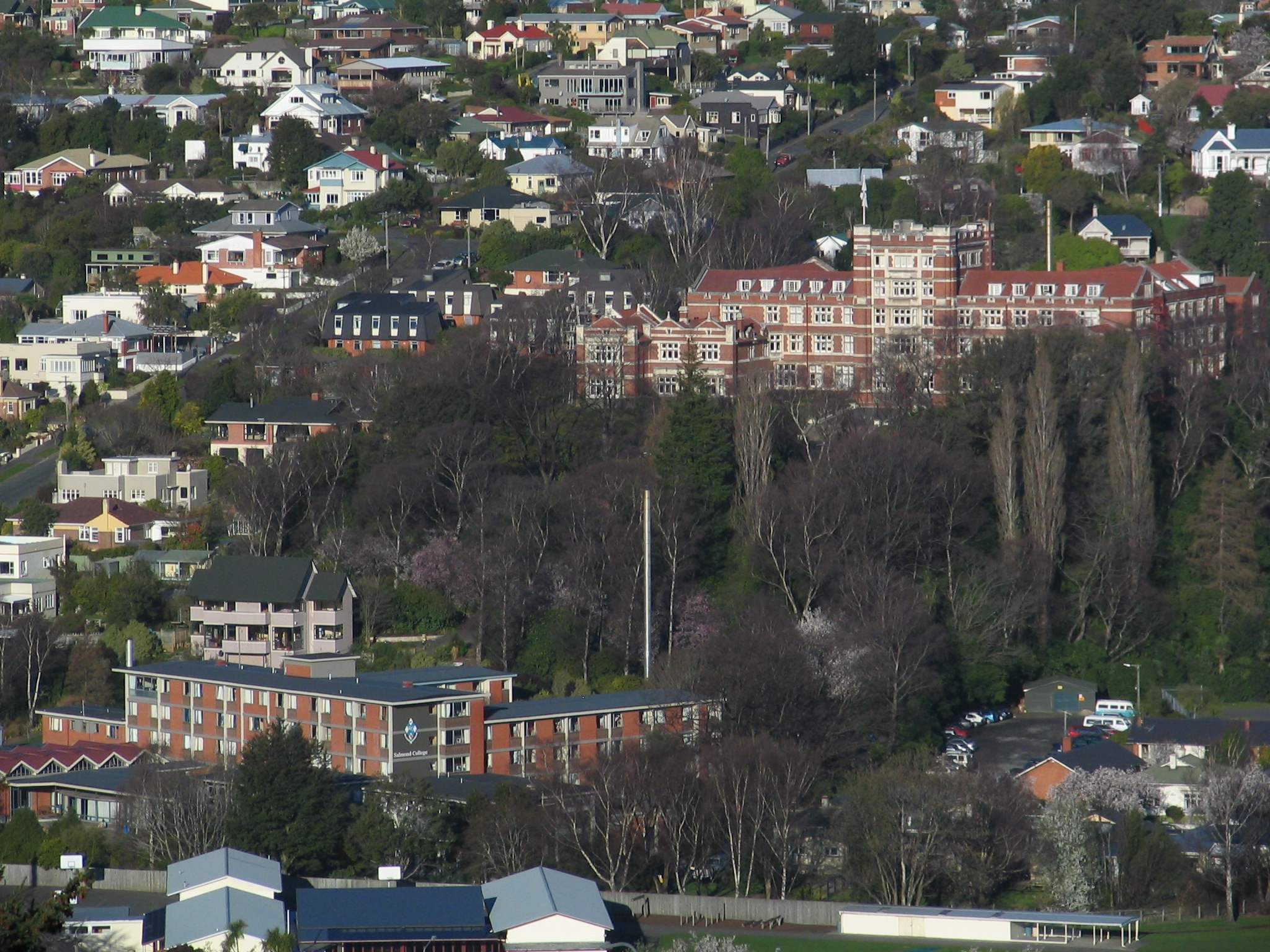
Knox and Salmond Colleges

In 1959 the College Council resumed its effort to extend the "South Wing". Money was raised, the plans revised, tenders were called in August 1961. The building was opened on 21 April 1963 for a cost of £44,501. This was another structure with a reinforced concrete frame, styled and dressed to match the building it joined. It extended the "South Wing" eastward, taking the southern range to its present extent, further closing the quadrangle. It stopped short of the line of the east range which at that time had not reached its full extent. It was named the "Ross Wing".

The quadrangle was still not completed and with the centennial of the Theological Hall approaching the College Council decided in August 1974 to mark it by extending the library. Fund raising was difficult but work began in August 1983. The extension was opened on 30 May 1984 for a cost of $463,000.

This is another structurally modern building dressed to complement the context. By this time Arthur Salmond had retired but his son John (1940–2008) was in practice. The addition extends the east range southwards, taking it to the line of the south range but leaving an open space between. With this the quadrangle was all but complete.

=== Post-millennial contributions ===
In 2008, the Hewitson Building was modified to house offices and teaching spaces for the newly formed Knox Centre for Ministry and Leadership (previously the School of Ministry), and to provide a purpose-built facility for the Presbyterian Archives.

In the summer of 2012–13, the main residential building was earthquake-strengthened to comply with the latest building code. At the same time, 40 rooms were added to the college. Some of these were the result of the reconfiguration of rooms and offices at the northern end of the ground floor of the main building; others were the result or rebuilding the area of the college known as The Close. Opportunity was also taken to refurbish the main building from top to bottom, and to open up the Great Hall to the Junior Common Room to facilitate dining for the increased numbers at the college on formal occasions. In the summer of 2019–2020, the area of the college known as Somerville Close, comprising Mackay, Marshall, Glendining and Wilson Houses, underwent an extensive refurbishment. Arden house was used also used for student accommodation from time to time.

== Presbyterian Research Centre ==
Knox College is home to the Presbyterian Research Centre, located in the Hewitson Library. The centre was established in January 2013, following the merger of the Hewitson Library and the Presbyterian Archive, and is tasked with preserving the history and records of the Presbyterian Church of Aotearoa New Zealand (PCANZ). The collection has its origins in the Historical Records Committee, which was established in 1927 to ensure the survival of church records.

The Presbyterian Research Centre collections include archives of the General Assembly and General Assembly committees, records of Presbyterian youth and women's organisations, local parishes, records of Knox College, and personal papers of prominent Presbyterian ministers and laypeople. Additionally, two archives held by the Presbyterian Research Centre have been inscribed on the UNESCO Memory of the World Aotearoa New Zealand Ngā Mahara o te Ao register: the Ng New Zealand Chinese Heritage Collection, and the PCANZ Deaconess Collection. The Ng New Zealand Chinese Heritage Collection was added to the register in November 2017, and includes material collected by historian James Ng from 1958 until the 2010s, documenting the early history of Chinese communities in New Zealand. Much of the collection also includes the records of Alexander Don, a late 19th century reverend who kept extensive notes on Chinese families in the South Island, in his attempt to convert Chinese goldmining communities to Christianity. The PCANZ Deaconess Collection was added in November 2018, and documents the history of the 175 Presbyterian women in New Zealand who became deaconesses between 1901 and 1975, during the period when the Presbyterian Church of New Zealand did not allow women to be ordained. The collection includes handwritten memoirs and personal effects of the deaconesses.

== Changes in governance and leadership ==
In February 2012, a commission was appointed by the General Assembly of the Presbyterian Church of Aotearoa New Zealand to assume responsibility for the governance and management of Knox and Salmond Colleges, instead of the Council of Knox College and Salmond College. The General Assembly took this action following two reviews of the college in 2011 – one by the University of Otago, and the other by the Presbyterian Church of Aotearoa New Zealand – each of which raised significant concerns about certain aspects of the culture of the college, especially in regards to alcohol and student welfare. The six-person commission comprised an equal number of church and university appointees. It saw numerous changes being put into effect immediately and other changes being proposed, some of which proved controversial among staff, students and alumni. The former master of the college, Bruce Aitken, offered his resignation on 20 July 2012. The protests of alumni attracted national press attention.

In 2015, the commission was discharged, and a new Board of Knox College and Salmond College was established to replace the former Council of Knox College and Salmond College. By that time, the Presbyterian Church's Council of Assembly was satisfied that the commission had done its work, the management of change was complete, and the process of cultural change at Knox was well under way. In 2017, the board articulated its vision for Knox College: To be a world-class residential college where students are part of a community that affirms and empowers every resident, expands thought and outlook, encourages service, fosters leadership, and builds strong bonds of friendship.

The first female head of college, Caroline Hepburn-Doole, was appointed in 2021. She was the college's deputy master for the previous five years.

== Controversy ==
In 2019, an article published in the Otago University Students' Association magazine, Critic Te Arohi, unveiled that the college had a culture of misogyny that normalised sexual misconduct against females. The article included the testimonies of several female residents who had been sexually harassed or assaulted at the college between 2015 and 2017, many of whom claimed that the college's leadership ignored or dismissed their claims when they were reported to them. The article received widespread media attention. Later however, Critic issued an apology for mis-reporting some aspects of the story.

== Notable alumni ==
Name	Entered	Notability	Reference
Sir Robert Aitken		Academia, Medicine: Former physician, Vice-Chancellor of the University of Otago and, later, of the University of Birmingham	
Dr David Galloway	1963	Academia: Lichenologist	
Sir Lloyd Geering		Academia: Theologian and Member of the Order of New Zealand	
Louis Chambers		Other: Generation Zero co-founder and Rhodes Scholar	
Emer. Prof George Petersen	1951	Academia: Biochemist and pioneer of genetics in New Zealand	
Professor Sir David Skegg	1967	Academia: Vice-Chancellor of the University of Otago	
Professor Graham Stanton		Academia: Former Lady Margaret's Professor of Divinity at Cambridge University	
Major-General Sir Harold Barrowclough		Law, Military: Former Chief Justice of New Zealand and member of Privy Council; led the 3rd New Zealand Division and, later, the New Zealand Pacific Forces during World War II. Awarded United States Legion of Merit and DSO with bar.	
The Honourable Justice Sir James B. Robertson	1968	Law: Judge of the Court of Appeal of New Zealand	
Prof Ian McDonald		Medicine: Early experimental neurologist and researcher into multiple sclerosis	
Dr Royden Somerville, QC		Law: Noted barrister appointed as a Queen's Counsel in 1998. Chancellor of the University of Otago, 2018.	
Sir George Douglas Robb		Medicine: Surgeon and medical reformer; former president of the British Medical Association	
The Right Honourable Ratu Sir Kamisese Mara		Politics: Former Prime Minister and President of Fiji	
Adam Hamilton		Politics: First (long-term) leader of the National Party	
Nikki Kaye, MP	1998	Politics: Former Member of Parliament for the Auckland Central electorate	
Tim Macindoe, MP	1980	Politics: Current Member of Parliament for the Hamilton West electorate	
Dr Gervan McMillan		Politics, Medicine: Early proponent of Social Security reform and minister in the First Labour Government	
Sir Arnold Nordmeyer		Politics: Member of the First Labour Government, later Minister of Finance (in which post he introduced the highly unpopular Black Budget) and sometime leader of the Labour Party. A founding member of the Order of New Zealand.	
Duncan Rae		Politics, Diplomacy: Former Member of Parliament for Parnell and, later, Eden; First Consul-General to Indonesia	
Alan Brash		Religion: Ecumenicalist and former Deputy General Secretary of the World Council of Churches	
James A.C. Ryan		Sport: Former New Zealand All Black	
Stephen Vlok		Sport: Dunedin Thunder Ice Hockey competing in the NZIHL	
James Fuller		Sport: Otago Volts Cricketer	
Hamish Bond		Sport: World Rowing Champion, Olympic Gold Medalist (2012)	
Luke Hazelton	2017	Sport: Athletics (100m)	

While many of those above have been resident at the college, some of those who attended as Divinity students may have received tuition while living in private accommodation.

For further details of on the alumni above, see the college's centennial history. Years provided are of initial entry, rather than of any returning periods.

== Coat of arms ==
The strong Scottish Presbyterian roots of Knox are reflected in its coat of arms, which takes the form of a blue St Andrew's Cross; superimposed on the St Andrew's Cross is the image of a white dove in flight, carrying an olive branch in its mouth, a symbolic depiction of the flood myth in Genesis 8, wherein the olive-branch-bearing dove is a symbol of life and peace. The college motto, Gratia et Veritas (Latin), or Grace and Truth (English), comes from the Prologue to the Gospel according to Saint John (John 1:).

Coat of arms of Knox College
Notes The Arms of Knox College were granted by the Lord Lyon on 1 October 1932. The design had been in use since 1909 Escutcheon Argent, on a saltire Azure a dove volant proper holding in its beak a sprig of olive Vert Motto Gratia et Veritas ('Grace and Truth')
