= Hugh Fletcher (businessman) =

New Zealand businessman

Chief executive of Fletcher Challenge Ltd
- In office 1987–1997

9th Chancellor of the University of Auckland
- In office 2004–2008
- Preceded by: John Graham
- Succeeded by: Roger France

Personal details
- Born: 28 November 1947 (age 78)
- Spouse: Sian Elias
- Education: University of Auckland; Stanford University

Hugh Alasdair Fletcher (born 28 November 1947) is a New Zealand businessman and former chancellor of the University of Auckland.

== Early life ==
Fletcher was the second son born to Sir James Fletcher and Vaughan, Lady Fletcher. After attending Kings College, he gained a BSc 1969 and MCom (Hons) 1974 from the University of Auckland, in addition to an MBA from Stanford University.

Fletcher's wife is the former Chief Justice of New Zealand Dame Sian Elias. His brother Angus Fletcher, who was also involved with the family firm, is ex-husband to former Mayor of Auckland, and City and Government Minister Christine Fletcher. His older brother Jim Fletcher was murdered at his holiday home in the Bay of Plenty in 1993.

== Fletcher Challenge ==
Fletcher played a major role in developing New Zealand industry as chief executive of Fletcher Challenge following in the footsteps of his father and grandfather Sir James Fletcher.

Fletcher was a New Zealand Representative on the Trilateral Commission. In 2002, he was appointed to the board of the Reserve Bank of New Zealand. He was subsequently reappointed in 2007. He is also Chair of the board of directors of IAG New Zealand and a board director of Fletcher Building and Vector Limited. In August 2007 he was appointed to the board of Insurance Australia Group.
