= James Fletcher (industrialist) =

New Zealand businessman (1886–1974)

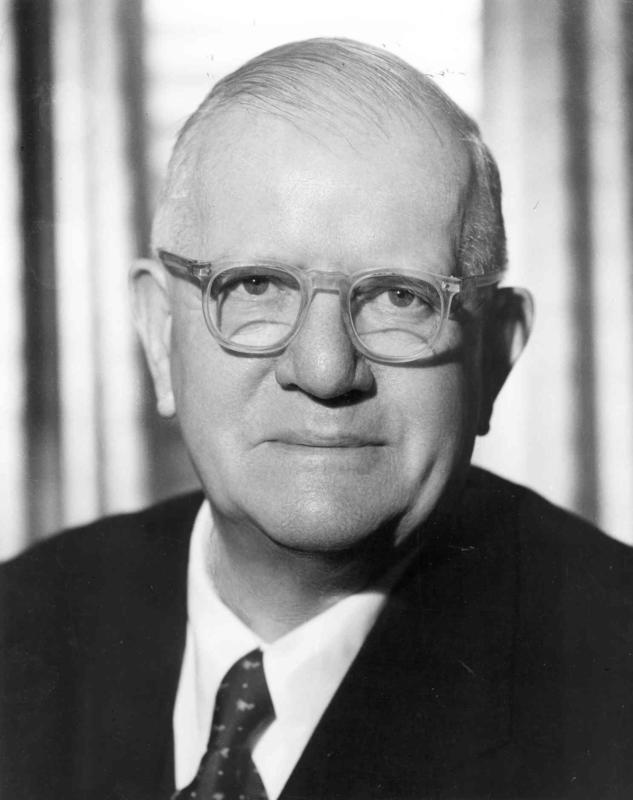
Sir James Fletcher - 80th birthday portrait

Sir James Fletcher (29 March 1886 – 12 August 1974) was a New Zealand industrialist who founded Fletcher Construction, one of the country's largest firms. His son, Sir James Fletcher Junior, continued to build the corporation.

He walked with a limp having broken his knee cap during his youth in Scotland.

== Early life ==
Fletcher was born at Kirkintilloch, Scotland, on 29 March 1886, the sixth son of John Shearer Fletcher and his wife Janet Montgomery Goodwin. He was educated in Glasgow, and worked for a time as a chemist’s assistant before being apprenticed as a carpenter. During the latter period he worked on a housing scheme in Springburn. The family spent holidays at Tarbert on Loch Fyne and spent weekends at their uncle David's Alton Farm which bred carriage horses. Early in 1908 he heard a lecture by New Zealand temperance advocate Rev Leonard Isitt on the benefits of New Zealand.

After pneumonia prevented him from moving to Canada as he originally had planned, he migrated instead to Dunedin, New Zealand, in 1908. He sailed on SS Bremen from Antwerp to Melbourne in Australia at a cost of £15. He then sailed on SS Ulimaroa to Port Chalmers, the harbour town serving Dunedin, arriving late in October 1908. Here he got a job as a joiner with local builders Crawford & Watson, moving to the larger firm of Thompson Bridger in 1909. Here he specialised in building stairs for six months.

He donated New Zealand marble to the town of Kirkintilloch in 1925 to construct a war memorial which stands today at the entrance to the town's Peel Park.

Fletcher died in Auckland on 12 August 1974. In 1994, he was an inaugural inductee into the New Zealand Business Hall of Fame.

== Family ==
On 20 December 1911 Fletcher married Charlotte Muir Cameron, daughter of merchant J M Cameron and niece of Rev Andrew Cameron of the Anderson's Bay Free Church. The ceremony took place at the Cameron house on Manor Place. Their first house was self-built and stood on Grove Street in Musselburgh. Two years later they moved to 72 Albert Street in Dunedin.

== Fletcher Construction ==
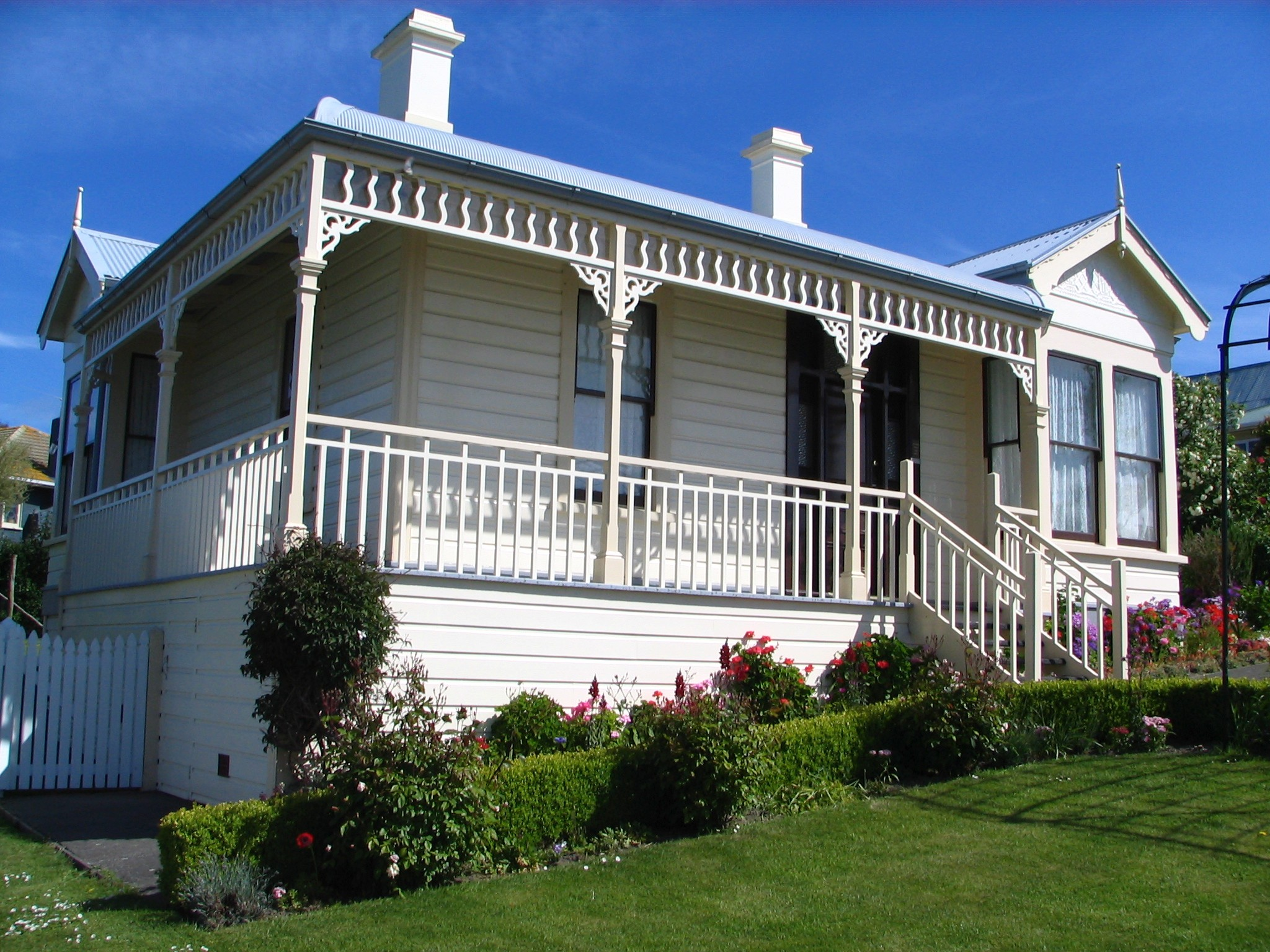
Fletcher House in Broad Bay, Dunedin, in 2008. This was the first house built by Fletcher (with Albert Morris). Constructed in 1909 it was restored in 1992.

In New Zealand in 1909 Fletcher established a building business with his brother William John, and an Englishman and fellow joiner, Albert Morris. This company was named Fletcher Brothers, as it had been in Scotland. In 1916, his brother John emigrated to Dunedin and joined the company, and the partnership was formed as a limited liability company. Within the 12 months to mid-1918, they put up the largest reinforced concrete building south of the equator, the Dominion Farmers' Institute in Wellington. From 1919 the company was called the Fletcher Construction Company. In 1940, the company was renamed Fletcher Holdings. Fletcher moved the businesses headquarters to Auckland in 1925. The company grew despite the difficult economic conditions, completing a number of major construction projects, such as the Chateau Tongariro and Dominion Museum in 1929.

Following the election of the First Labour Government in 1935, Fletcher established an enduring friendship with the government. Fletchers' built some of the first state houses in New Zealand.

Fletcher was seconded by the government in 1942. His second eldest son, also called James, took over the running of Fletcher Holdings at this time. Throughout the Second World War he held several positions, first as Commissioner of Defence Construction, then Superintendent of Military Works, and later Controller of Shipping.

Fletcher had many other business interests, including the Imperial Chemical Industries (ICI), the Tasman Pulp and Paper Company, and New Zealand Paper Mills. Fletcher Senior was appointed a Knight Bachelor, for public services, in the 1946 New Year Honours, and was awarded the Queen Elizabeth II Coronation Medal in 1953.

== See also ==
- James Muir Cameron Fletcher
- Hugh Fletcher
- Fletcher Construction
- Fletcher Challenge
