= New Zealand International Convention Centre fire =

2019 fire in Auckland, New Zealand

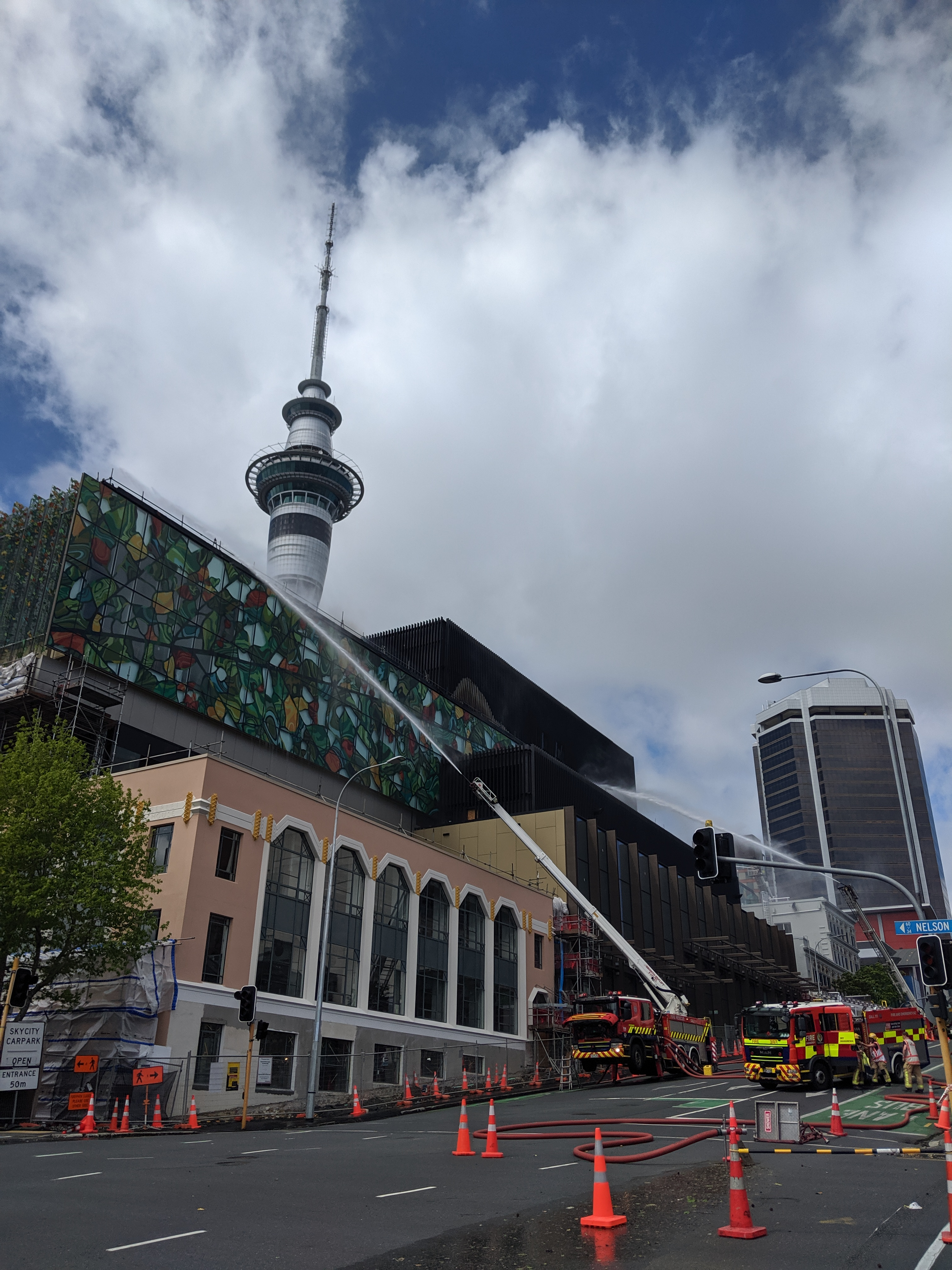
- Firefighters using fire engines to combat the fire on October 23
- Date: 22 October 2019 (7 years ago)
- Location: Auckland CBD, Auckland, New Zealand; 36.8491°S 174.7603°E
- Type: Fire

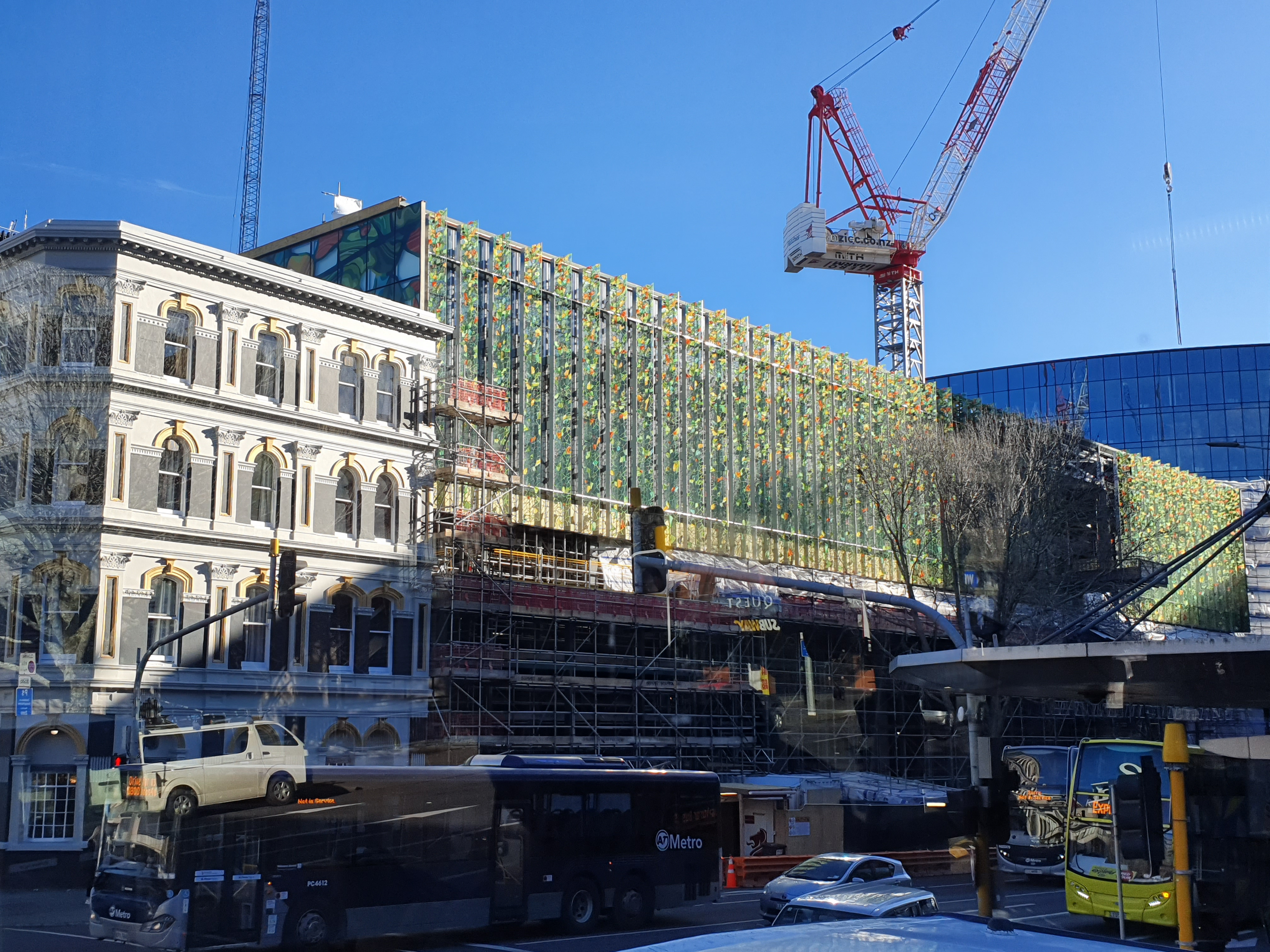
The New Zealand International Convention Centre construction site, two months prior to the fire

On Tuesday, 22 October 2019, a fire broke out on the roof of the New Zealand International Convention Centre in Auckland, New Zealand. The convention centre is to become part of the SkyCity complex and was undergoing construction by Fletcher Construction, due for completion before the end of the year. The site was occupied by construction workers at the time and was not open to the public.

The incident led to large-scale disruption in Auckland for over 48 hours as the fire continued to burn, forcing areas of the city centre to be shut down, in part because of disruption caused by smoke that was deemed toxic. Media organisations including TVNZ were impacted by building evacuations and street closures, leading to disruptions in national broadcasts and programming. The effort to put out the blaze resulted in a large emergency service response, including mobile alerts issued by Civil Defence.

By the evening of the fire, it had been classified as a "sixth-alarm", the highest category of response for an urban fire in New Zealand. Efforts to put out the blaze were complicated by unfavourable weather, with winds of up to 110 km/h (68 mph) fanning flames. The fire continued to burn through to the following day, and efforts to extinguish and monitor hotspots continued through to Friday of that week.

The Ministry of Civil Defence and Emergency Management issued a mobile alert following the fire, warning Auckland residents to stay away from the city.

On 15 January 2022, a second fire broke out on the roof of the convention centre. Police and at least seven fire engines attended.

== Incident ==
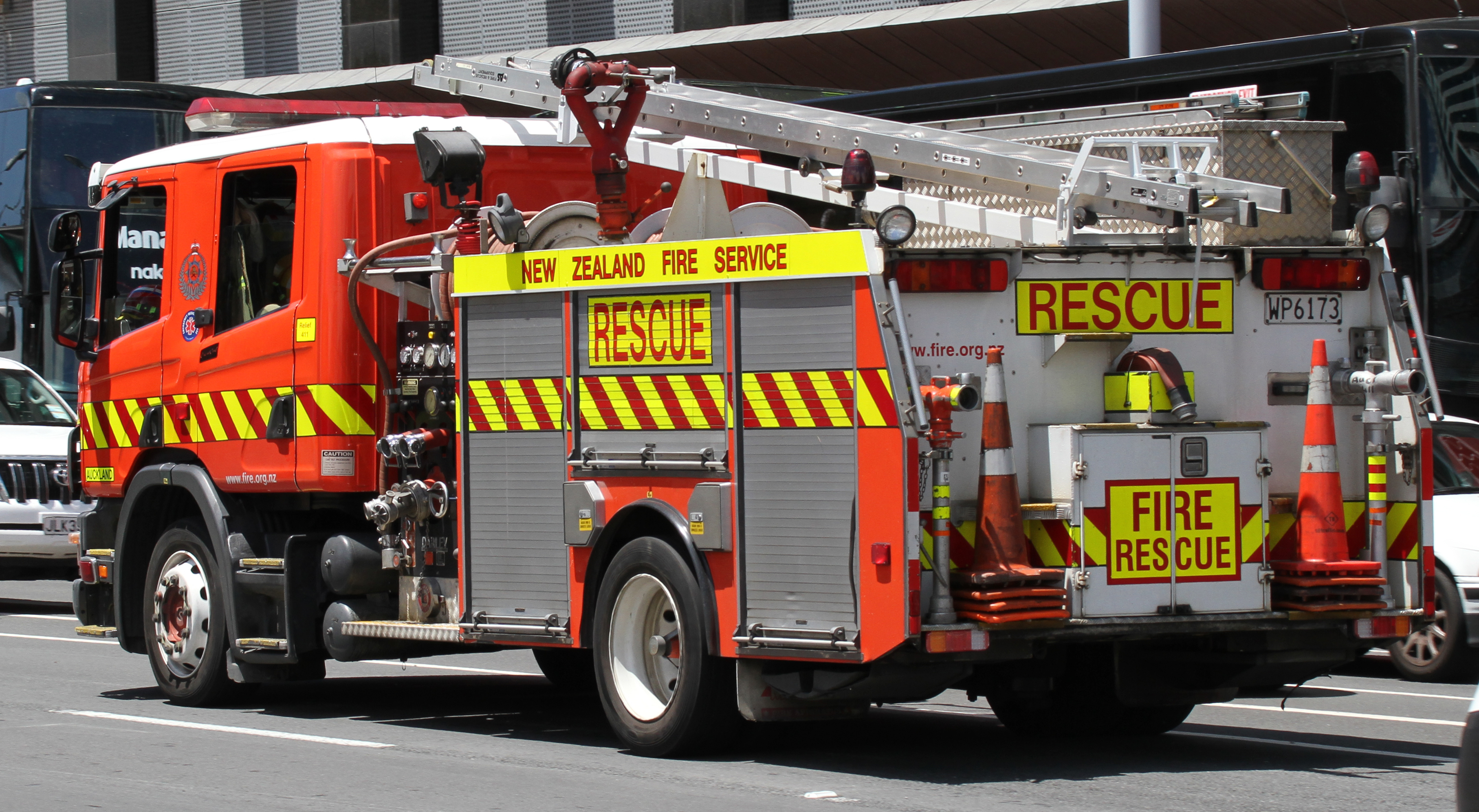
Over 30 fire appliances attended the blaze (Auckland fire truck pictured in 2017).

Just after 1:00 pm on Tuesday 22 October 2019, construction workers began to evacuate the building site of the New Zealand International Convention Centre. Approximately 100 workers were on site at the time. Fire and Emergency New Zealand were alerted to the fire via a 111 call at 1:09:37 pm. The first fire appliance arrived on the scene at 1:14:03 pm.

An hour after the event unfolded, Auckland mayor Phil Goff reportedly claimed he and other council staff had been watching the blaze, and that it had already spread right through the western and eastern sides of the building. It was reported that people in nearby buildings claimed the heat could be felt on windows, and pedestrians began to gather on Queen Street to watch the smoke as the blaze grew bigger.

The fire burned on through the night despite efforts to keep it under control. By the following evening, much of the roof had burned away. Firefighters made the decision to allow it to burn out. Approximately 30 fire appliances and over 100 fire service staff had been present at the site by this time. The fire was under control by Thursday evening, but firefighters continued to monitor hotspots in the building on Friday.

Shares in Fletcher Building and SkyCity dropped hours after the incident.

As to the cause of the fire, an independently peer-reviewed Fire and Emergency New Zealand report concluded the probable cause of the fire "is believed to be an inadvertent ignition of the cardboard centre of a roll of Cap Sheet torch-on waterproofing membrane."

== Casualties ==
There were no deaths as a direct result of the fire. Four people were injured in the incident; three were treated for minor injuries at the scene, and another was taken to Auckland City Hospital in a moderate condition. A firefighter who suffered a medical event while at the site was taken to hospital in a serious condition, but was discharged the following day.

== Impact on Auckland ==
The fire caused widespread disruption in Auckland for two days. Streets in the city centre were closed, and evacuations of nearby buildings continued into the morning of 23 October, including the headquarters of TVNZ, the Auckland District Court, and other central buildings. Residents were advised to avoid entering the central city due to smoke being fanned by winds.

The Sky Tower was promptly closed following the fire. By the afternoon of 22 October, the full SkyCity complex had been shut down, including the casino, hotels, and carpark. Other hotels and organisations in hospitality reportedly offered to help SkyCity guests who were displaced by the closures. Among those displaced were the Great Britain Lions who were staying at the SkyCity Grand Hotel when it was evacuated.

=== Health concerns ===
==== Smoke-related ====
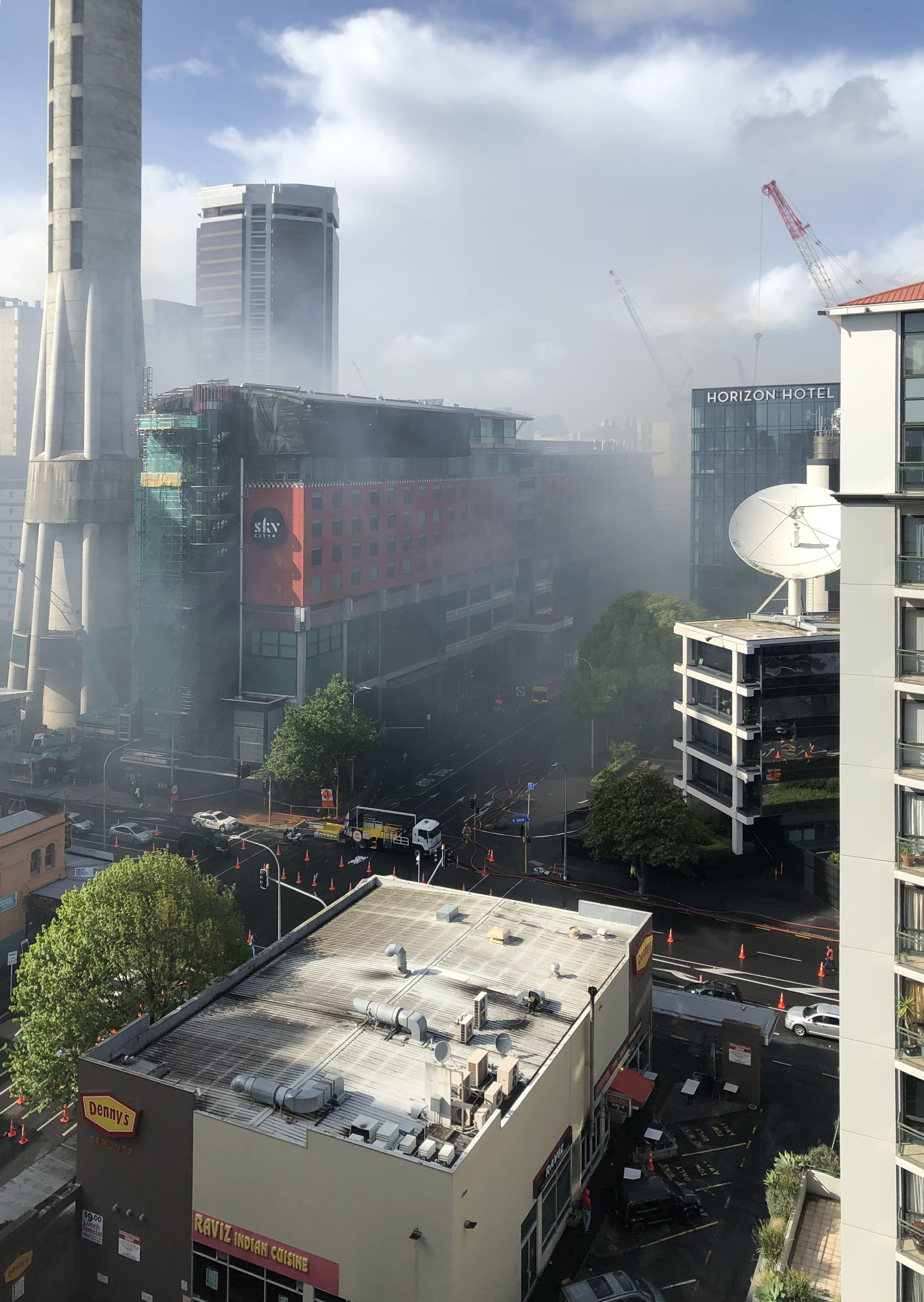
Smoke from the fire seen from a nearby apartment building on 23 October. The TVNZ Television Centre is visible centre right.

Concerns have been raised as to the toxicity of the black smoke. Residents living in nearby apartments claimed that their apartments smelled of "burning plastic" and induced nausea and other symptoms. A spokesperson for the Auckland District Health Board said there had been no smoke-related hospital admissions during the first night that the fire burned, however a public health alert was issued by the Auckland Regional Public Health Service advising residents to stay away from the smoke where possible. Those who were near the site began to wear face masks. By Thursday, officials advised nearby residents to keep windows closed and shut down external ventilators in their buildings if necessary.

==== Water pollution ====
Contaminated water that had collected in the basement of the building was pumped out into the Viaduct harbour. Reports indicated there were approximately 100 vehicles parked in the basement and submerged in the water. Auckland Council issued a safety warning to residents as toxicology tests were being conducted to determine if the water posed a threat to human health or sealife.

=== Disruption of media broadcasts ===
On 22 October, 1News continued to broadcast from its headquarters, on the same block as the fire. Just before the morning show Breakfast went to air on 23 October, they were evacuated. BBC World News aired on TVNZ 1 for 15 minutes, before Breakfast came on air, broadcasting from the streets and in a backup studio: the TVNZ BCP site, which is located under the Spark NZ building down the road from the TVNZ studios. 1 News At Midday was reduced to a five-minute bulletin, and Te Karere and 1 News Tonight were cancelled; 1 News at 6pm was a full 60-minute bulletin. On 23 October, programming returned to normal, but still from the backup studio. Lotto New Zealand could not access their studio at TVNZ or their regular draw machines, so the Wednesday 23 October draw was conducted off-air at their Newmarket headquarters using their backup random number generator. It was the first time since Lotto began in 1987 that the draw was conducted completely off-air. They returned to their normal site on 30 October.

== Aftermath ==
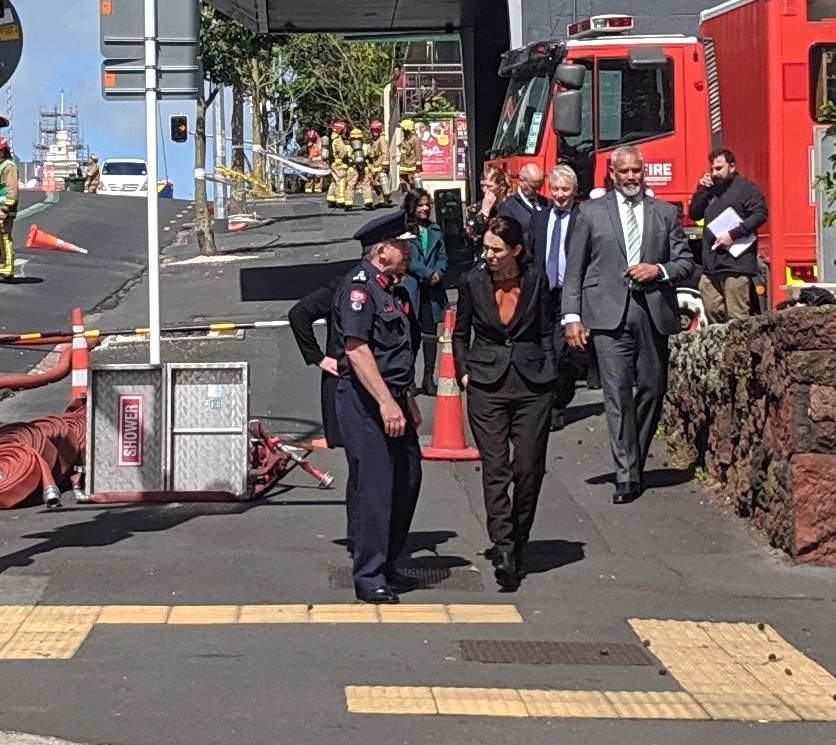
Prime Minister Ardern being shown the site of the fire

=== Political response ===
New Zealand Prime Minister Jacinda Ardern publicly praised the firefighters that were involved in the effort, describing them as "incredibly professional" and insisting that it would not change plans for the APEC conference in 2021. She visited the site alongside Mayor of Auckland Phil Goff, who also praised firefighters, stating "they have done us proud." Various MPs praised emergency services battling the blaze during a parliamentary meeting the day following the blaze.

Former Green Party politician Russel Norman made a political criticism following the fire, writing "always said John Key's convention centre deal stank" in reference to former prime minister John Key's SkyCity deal in 2011. He continued, "Today it stinks of burnt plastic, right across Auckland CBD". The comments received backlash for being "inconsiderate" of those harmed by the fire.

=== Cost of incident ===
Following the incident, questions were raised as to what financial impact the fire would have, and if it would be the burden of insurers. Willis Towers Watson is acting as the insurance broker, but refused to comment to media. SkyCity Entertainment Group decided not to disclose the insurer. The cost of repair is likely to cost many millions of dollars.

On 7 November 2019, SkyCity told investors that the convention centre would not be ready for conventions booked in 2021, impacting at least two dozen major conferences and ruling out the hosting of the 2021 APEC conference, which would have to find other venues.

The project is estimated to cost $750 million as of April 2022.

== See also ==
- List of building or structure fires
