= Fletcher Building =

New Zealand construction management company

Fletcher Building Limited
- Type: Public
- Traded as: NZX: FBU; ASX: FBU
- Industry: Manufacturing and Building Products
- Founded: 2001
- Headquarters: Auckland, New Zealand
- Area served: New Zealand and Australia
- Key people: Andrew Reding (Managing Director and CEO)
- Products: Manufacturing and Building products
- Services: Manufacturing and Distribution
- Revenue: NZ$9,004 million [FY2016]
- Number of employees: Approx 12,000 across New Zealand and Australia
- Website: fletcherbuilding.com

Fletcher Building Limited is a New Zealand construction management company.

== Structure and divisions ==
Fletcher Building originated through the activities of Fletcher Construction, which grew into the Fletcher Challenge conglomerate in 1981 and became, for a time, New Zealand's largest business and multinational. The company was split out from Fletcher Challenge in 2001.

Andrew Reding started as Group Chief Executive Officer and Managing Director in August 2024.

The company operates in four divisions: Light Building Products, Distribution, Heavy Building Products, Residential and Development.

=== Distribution ===
Fletcher's retail operations date back to its first building supply site in Dunedin in 1910.

PlaceMakers has been the main trading brand for Fletcher Distribution's retail stores around the country since 1954. The chain has 62 stores in 2019, up from 52 in the late 1990s and early 2000s. PlaceMakers has 11 stores in Auckland, with a head office in Penrose, Auckland.

Fletcher operated the Building Depot retail chain until 2003. It had 10 stores, including five in Auckland. Fletcher sold the chain to entrepreneur Mark Taylor in 2003 and two of its Auckland stores were closed. Building Depot went into receivership in 2004.

== History ==
=== SkyCity Convention Centre Fire ===
The New Zealand International Convention Centre fire occurred on 22nd of October 2019 when cardboard below the roofing cap sheet began smoldering after being ignited by a worker's blowtorch. The resulting fire engulfed much of central Auckland, closing the entire Sky City precinct including the Sky Tower, and left four people injured due to the fire and billowing smoke. The fire had a major impact on Fletcher Building which may ultimately be difficult to fully quantify with costs estimated in the hundreds of millions, and ultimately precipitated Fletcher Building discontinuing their 'verticals' arm of Fletcher Construction.

In early June 2025, the SkyCity Entertainment Group sued Fletcher Building and its sister company Fletcher Construction for the sum of NZ$330 million on the grounds that the companies had taken ten years instead of three years to build the New Zealand International Convention Centre at SkyCity Auckland. SkyCity sought damages for losses incurred by the company caused by ongoing delays from the completion of the project, including damages resulting from the New Zealand International Convention Centre fire in 2019. In response, Fletcher Building said that it rejected breaching its contract with SkyCity and would contest the lawsuit.

=== COVID-19 pandemic ===
In April 2020, in response to the COVID-19 pandemic in New Zealand, Fletcher Building senior executives had their salaries cut by 30%. The cut was part of a pay-plan suggested by the company to deal with financial impacts. Under the plan, non-working staff would receive a 35% pay cut, which would increase to 50% in May and 70% in June.

On 20 May, Fletcher Building announced its intention to lay off about 1000 staff in New Zealand, or approximately 10 percent of its workforce, as a result of the COVID-19 pandemic.

On 11 August, it was reported that Fletcher Building was expecting a loss of NZ$196 million for the year to June 2020 as a result of the COVID-19 pandemic.

=== 2021–22 plasterboard shortage ===
In response to a nationwide shortage of plasterboards (gib), Fletcher began rationing plasterboard orders in February 2022. By that time, the company controlled 94% of New Zealand's gib market, which had earlier triggered a Commerce Commission probe in November 2021 into whether Fletcher was blocking competitors from entering the New Zealand market. The Commerce Commission's investigation would also investigate the perceived lack of competition within the New Zealand residential building competition and whether the cost of building materials was too high. By May 2022, the plasterboard shortage had caused significant delays to building projects across New Zealand. The shortage of building supplies and construction delays also forced at least 12 companies including Christchurch building firm Maxim towards insolvency. The shortage had forced builders and retailers including Bunnings to explore alternative plasterboard sources from overseas including China as well as domestic competitor Elephant Plasterboard.

In early June 2022, Fletcher Building after video footage emerged that its subsidiary Winstone Wallboards had given another subsidiary Fletcher Living preferential access to its gib-board supplies. This preferential treatment violated the company's own policy and occurred in the midst of a national plasterboard shortage. On 10 June, social housing provider Simplicity Living cancelled its contract with Fletcher citing supply delays and opted to import plasterboard from Thailand. On 13 June, Simplicity Living and the Shareholders Association met with Fletcher Building to discuss the gib plasterboard shortage. In response, the company's CEO Ross Taylor confirmed that it would boost production at its existing factories, with plans being made to open a new factory in Tauranga in 2023. Rival plasterboard supplier Elephant Plasterboard criticised Fletcher Building's monopoly over the New Zealand building market.

On 16 June, Taylor confirmed that Fletcher was also importing more plasterboard material from Australia with plans to produce 1 million square metres of plasterboard between June and September 2022; enough to supply 2,000 houses. On 17 June, Fletcher shareholders including Simplicity Living met with the company's executives. Simplicity chief executive Sam Stubbs criticised Fletcher's leadership for their perceived lack of accountability, questioning their attribution for the plasterboard supply shortage to COVID-19 lockdown restrictions between 2020 and 2021. The Shareholders' Association also voiced concerns about the implications of the gib shortage for Fletcher's finances and reputation.

On 21 June, Building and Construction Minister Megan Woods established a ministerial taskforce to investigate ways of easing the national gib board shortage, including obtaining alternative plasterboard supplies. In addition, Woods asked Fletcher not to enforce some of its trademarks for at least 12 months.

== See also ==
- Fletcher House - a historic house and museum built in 1910 by company founder Sir James Fletcher.
