= Sian Elias =

New Zealand judge, and 12th Chief Justice of New Zealand

The Right Honourable Dame Sian Elias GNZM KC
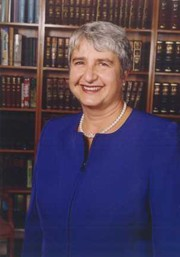

12th Chief Justice of New Zealand
- In office 17 May 1999 – 13 March 2019
- Nominated by: Jenny Shipley
- Appointed by: Sir Michael Hardie Boys
- Preceded by: Thomas Eichelbaum
- Succeeded by: Helen Winkelmann

Administrator of the Government (Acting Governor-General)
- In office 31 August 2016 – 28 September 2016
- Monarch: Elizabeth II
- Prime Minister: John Key
- In office 23 August 2011 – 31 August 2011
- Monarch: Elizabeth II
- Prime Minister: John Key
- In office 4 August 2006 – 23 August 2006
- Monarch: Elizabeth II
- Prime Minister: Helen Clark
- In office 22 March 2001 – 4 April 2001
- Monarch: Elizabeth II
- Prime Minister: Helen Clark

Personal details
- Born: Sian Seerpoohi Elias; 13 March 1949 (age 77) London, England
- Spouse: Hugh Fletcher
- Children: Two
- Education: University of Auckland; Stanford Law School
- Profession: Barrister
- Awards: New Zealand 1990 Commemoration Medal

Dame Sian Seerpoohi Elias GNZM KC PC (born 13 March 1949) is a former New Zealand judge who served as the 12th chief justice of New Zealand, and was therefore the most senior member of the country's judiciary. She was the inaugural presiding judge of the Supreme Court of New Zealand and on several occasions acted as administrator of the Government.

== Early life and family ==
Born in London of an Armenian father and a Welsh mother (hence her Welsh forename and Armenian surname), Elias arrived in New Zealand in 1952, and later attended Diocesan School for Girls in Auckland. She completed a law degree from the University of Auckland in 1970, and then undertook further study at Stanford University. She took up employment with an Auckland law firm in 1972, beginning her career as a barrister three years later. She also served as a member of the Motor Spirits Licensing Appeal Authority and of the Working Party on the Environment.

Elias is married to Hugh Fletcher, former CEO of Fletcher Challenge and a former Chancellor of the University of Auckland.

== Early judicial career ==
Elias served as a Law Commissioner from 1984 to 1988. She is also known for her work in relation to various Treaty-related cases. In 1990, she was awarded a New Zealand 1990 Commemoration Medal in recognition of her services. In 1988 she and Lowell Goddard were made the first women Queen's Counsel in New Zealand. Elias became a judge of the High Court in 1995, and occasionally sat on the Court of Appeal.

== Chief Justice ==
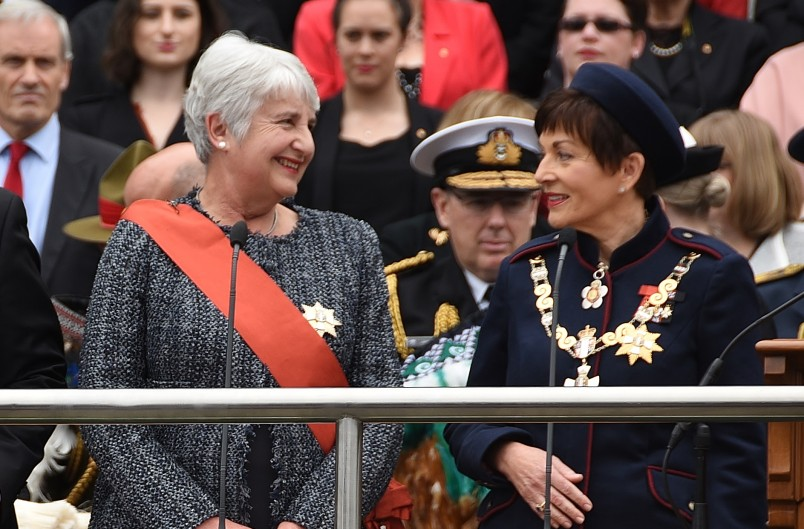
Elias swearing-in Governor-General Dame Patsy Reddy, 28 September 2016

On 17 May 1999, Elias was sworn in as Chief Justice of New Zealand, the first woman to hold that position in New Zealand. In the 1999 Queen's Birthday Honours, she was appointed a Dame Grand Companion of the New Zealand Order of Merit.

=== Service as Administrator of the Government ===
One aspect of the role of chief justice that of administrator of the Government when the governor-general is unable to fulfil their duties (due to a vacancy in the position, illness, absence from New Zealand or some other cause). Elias most prominently held the role of administrator of the Government from 22 March 2001 until 4 April 2001, between the terms of Sir Michael Hardie Boys and Dame Silvia Cartwright, from 4 August 2006 until 23 August 2006 between Cartwright's term and that of Sir Anand Satyanand, from 23 August 2011 until 31 August 2011 between the terms of Satyanand and Sir Jerry Mateparae, from 31 August 2016 until 28 September 2016 between the terms of Mateparae and Dame Patsy Reddy, and at other times when the governor-general has been unable to act.

=== Support for Māori Treaty claims ===
In 1984, Elias helped Ngāneko Minhinnick's Manukau Harbour claim to the Waitangi Tribunal. This led to work on other treaty cases, including as counsel in New Zealand Maori Council v Attorney-General, and in a claim to prevent the Government selling radio frequencies, and the case challenging the 1994 Māori electoral option. In June 2003 she was involved in a landmark case which allowed for the possibility that the Māori Land Court could issue freehold title over the foreshore and seabed. The subsequent legal uncertainties and upheavals in Māoridom dominated the political agenda for the next 18 months.

=== The Blameless Babes speech ===
In July 2009, Elias caused controversy with her remarks in the annual Shirley Smith address, organised by the Wellington Branch of the New Zealand Law Society's Women-in-Law committee. The annual lecture is given in honour of noted criminal defence lawyer, Shirley Smith. The speech was entitled "Blameless Babes" after a quote from Smith, who wrote "[providing] a prison at the bottom of the cliff is not a solution. Criminals will just go on falling into it, at great cost to the community. We have to find out why blameless babes become criminals."

In her speech, Elias expressed concern about prison overcrowding and argued against what she described as the "punitive and knee-jerk" attitude of politicians towards the criminal justice system.

As a final point, Elias said that unless New Zealand takes action to address the underlying causes of crime, Government may be forced into the position of using executive amnesties to reduce the growing number of prisoners. The Chief Justice's comments were widely reported in the media. Simon Power, the Minister of Justice, said in response: "The Chief Justice's speech does not represent Government policy in any way, shape or form".

Legal offices
Preceded by Thomas Eichelbaum	Chief Justice of New Zealand; 1999–2019	Succeeded by Helen Winkelmann
Government offices
Preceded by Sir Michael Hardie Boys	Administrator of New Zealand; 2001; 2006; 2011; 2016	Succeeded by Dame Silvia Cartwright
Preceded by Dame Silvia Cartwright	Administrator of New Zealand; 2001; 2006; 2011; 2016	Succeeded by Sir Anand Satyanand
Preceded by Sir Anand Satyanand	Administrator of New Zealand; 2001; 2006; 2011; 2016	Succeeded by Sir Jerry Mateparae
Preceded by Sir Jerry Mateparae	Administrator of New Zealand; 2001; 2006; 2011; 2016	Succeeded by Dame Patsy Reddy
