= Fletcher Construction =

Major New Zealand construction company

- Type: Subsidiary
- Industry: Construction
- Founded: 1919
- Headquarters: Auckland, New Zealand
- Area served: New Zealand
- Key people: Phil Boylen, CEO
- Services: Construction
- Parent: Vinci Construction
- Website: www.fletcherconstruction.co.nz

Fletcher Construction is a New Zealand construction company founded in 1909 and a subsidiary of VINCI Construction. Together with Higgins Contractors Ltd and Brian Perry Civil, it forms part of VINCI Construction's operations in New Zealand. Previously a subsidiary of Fletcher Building, the Construction Division was acquired by VINCI Construction in May 2026. Fletcher Construction is widely known in New Zealand, and has delivered various projects including constructing the Auckland Sky Tower.

It has three main business units:

- Major Projects
- Higgins
- Brian Perry Civil

== History ==
In 1909 James Fletcher senior, a builder and stonemason from Scotland, began a building business along with Englishman Albert Morris. The firm was known as Fletcher and Morris and received their first commission on 1 June 1909. This was for a double bay wooden villa at Broad Bay on the Otago Peninsula and was built for £375 (New Zealand still used British pounds at that time). The house was occupied on 10 November 1909 by local merchant Hubert Green following his marriage to Agnes Galloway. However, they made no profit in this venture. It later became Fletcher Bros. The house, now known as Fletcher House, still stands and is open to the public. However, despite being bailed out by friends their company made a net loss and they had to cease trading in 1910. In January 1911 they revitalised the firm with a bit more financial acumen, building houses in Abbotsford and south Dunedin. In March 1911 they started their first workshop: on Cameron Street next to the railway.

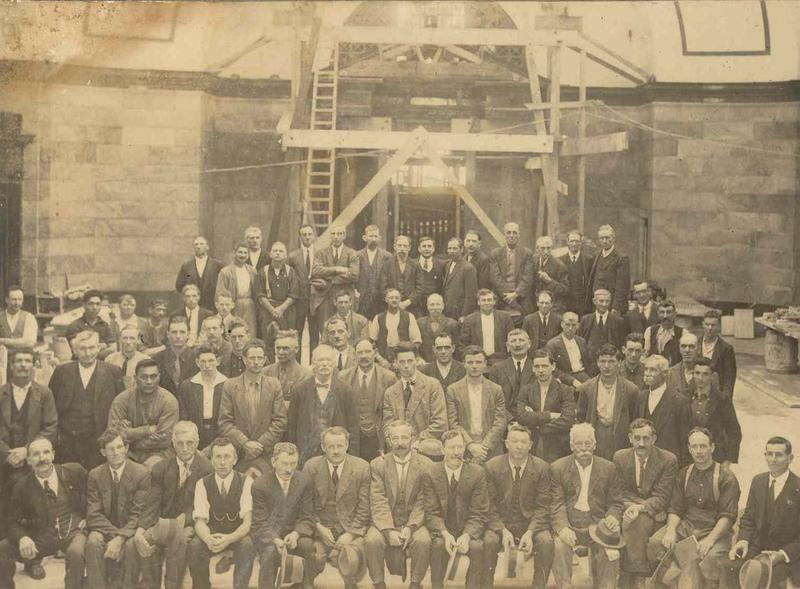
Workmen on construction site of Ross Chapel, Knox College, c.1912

In the summer of 1911 the firm was joined by James' brother William John Fletcher, who was a trained stonemason. He invested $1000 to become an equal partner. On 24 November 1911 they received their first larger (non-domestic) commission: a Coronation Hall for the St Kilda district. This was designed by local architects Mason & Wales.

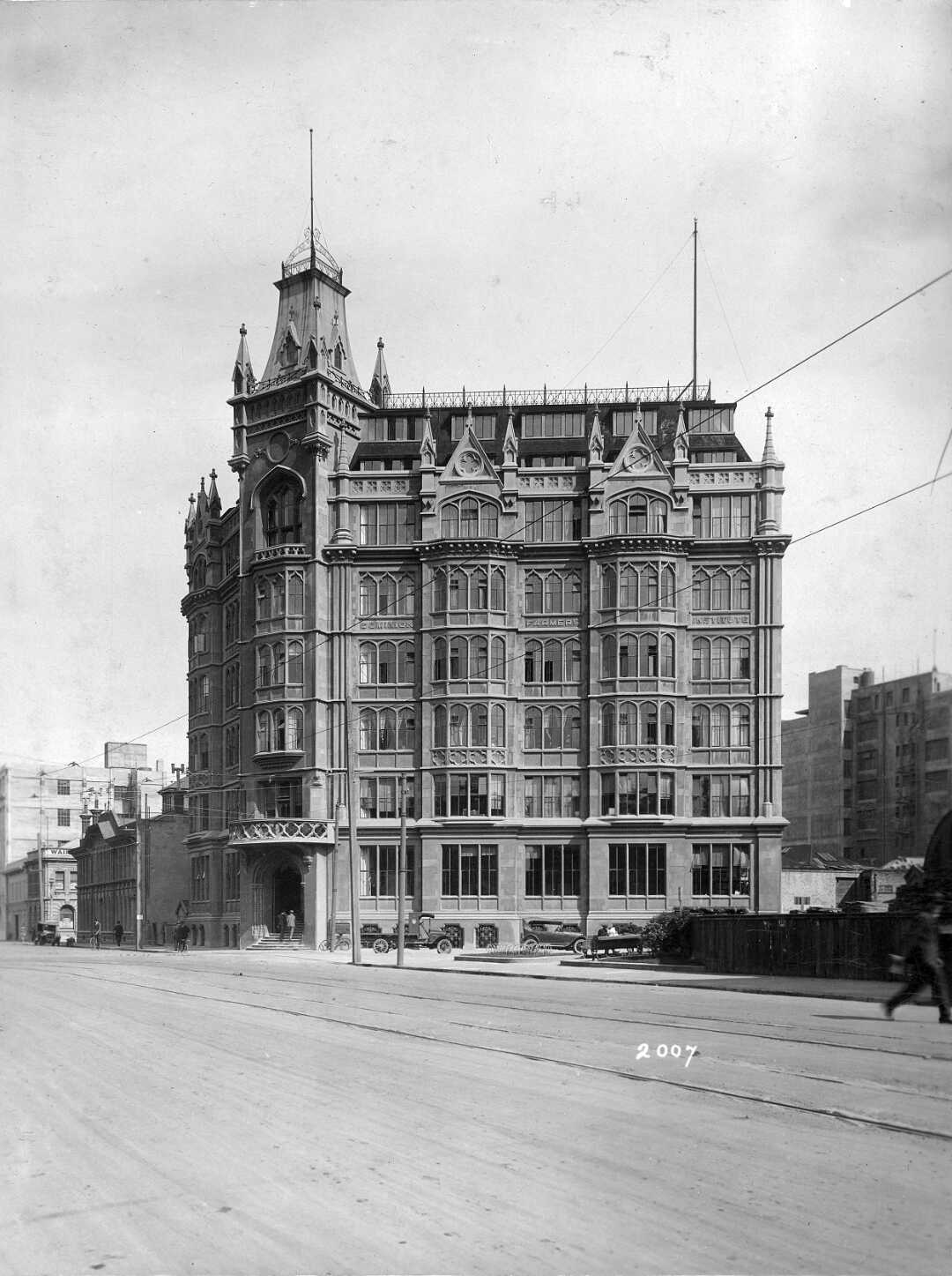
Dominion Farmers' Institute, Wellington, completed 1918

The company was renamed Fletcher Brothers in May 1912 after the departure of Bert Morris, who took fright at their first truly large project: Knox College, Otago. This contract was received through James' in-law Rev Andrew Cameron who was chairman of the building committee.

The company was registered as a limited liability company in May 1916.

In 1917 they renewed their link to architects Mason & Wales in the building of the 102 bed Nurses Home for Dunedin Hospital.

In 1925 the company headquarters was moved to Auckland, and in 1940 Fletcher Construction became a subsidiary of the Fletcher Holdings group, which listed on the share market that year. In 1942, following the resignation of his father to help New Zealand's war effort, James Fletcher junior became managing director of the company. Fletcher junior placed a greater emphasis on the firms building products manufacturing divisions, with Fletcher Construction retaining the core construction business.

In 1981, Fletcher Holdings merged with Challenge Corporation Ltd and Tasman Pulp Paper Ltd to form Fletcher Challenge. Fletcher Building was formed with the split of Fletcher Challenge in 2001.

In January 2026, Fletcher Building announced the sale of its Construction Division to VINCI Construction, a subsidiary of French infrastructure group VINCI. The transaction was finalised on 29 May 2026.

At the time of acquisition, Fletcher Construction employed more than 2,300 people in New Zealand and generated annual revenue of approximately €630 million (NZ$1.3 billion). The company's main areas of expertise cover hydraulic, maritime, port, airport, railway and road works, with a growing volume of activity in the field of renewable energies.

The acquisition strengthened VINCI Construction's existing presence in New Zealand alongside HEB Construction, based in Auckland and acquired in 2015, as well as SOL in Christchurch and Wharehine in the North Island, both acquired in 2025. Together, these businesses position VINCI Construction as a major player in New Zealand's infrastructure market. With all activities combined, VINCI generated revenue of more than €830 million in New Zealand in 2025.

== Major projects ==
Major projects have included:

- Knox College, Otago (first large project, 1912–13)
- Kingseat Hospital
- Te Papa Museum in Wellington (completed in 1996)
- SkyCity Auckland Convention Centre and Grand Hotel (completed in 1996)
- Sky Tower (completed in 1997)
- Westpac Stadium in Wellington (completed in 1999)
- Manapouri Second Tailrace Tunnel (completed in 2002)
- Upper Harbour Bridge in Auckland (completed in 2006)
- Rewa Bridge in Fiji (completed in 2006)
- Northern Busway, Auckland associated infrastructure (completed in 2008)
- Manukau Harbour Crossing (completed in 2011)
- Waterview Connection (completed in 2017)
- Fonterra Building (completed in 2016)
- Fergusson Wharf (completed in 2017)
- Hobson Bay Tunnel (completed in 2010)
- Momi Bay Resort (completed in 2017)
- Fiji Four Long Bridges Project (completed in 2016)
- New Zealand International Convention Centre, Auckland which caught fire while under construction in October 2019
