= Alexander Don =

Australian missionary (1857–1934)

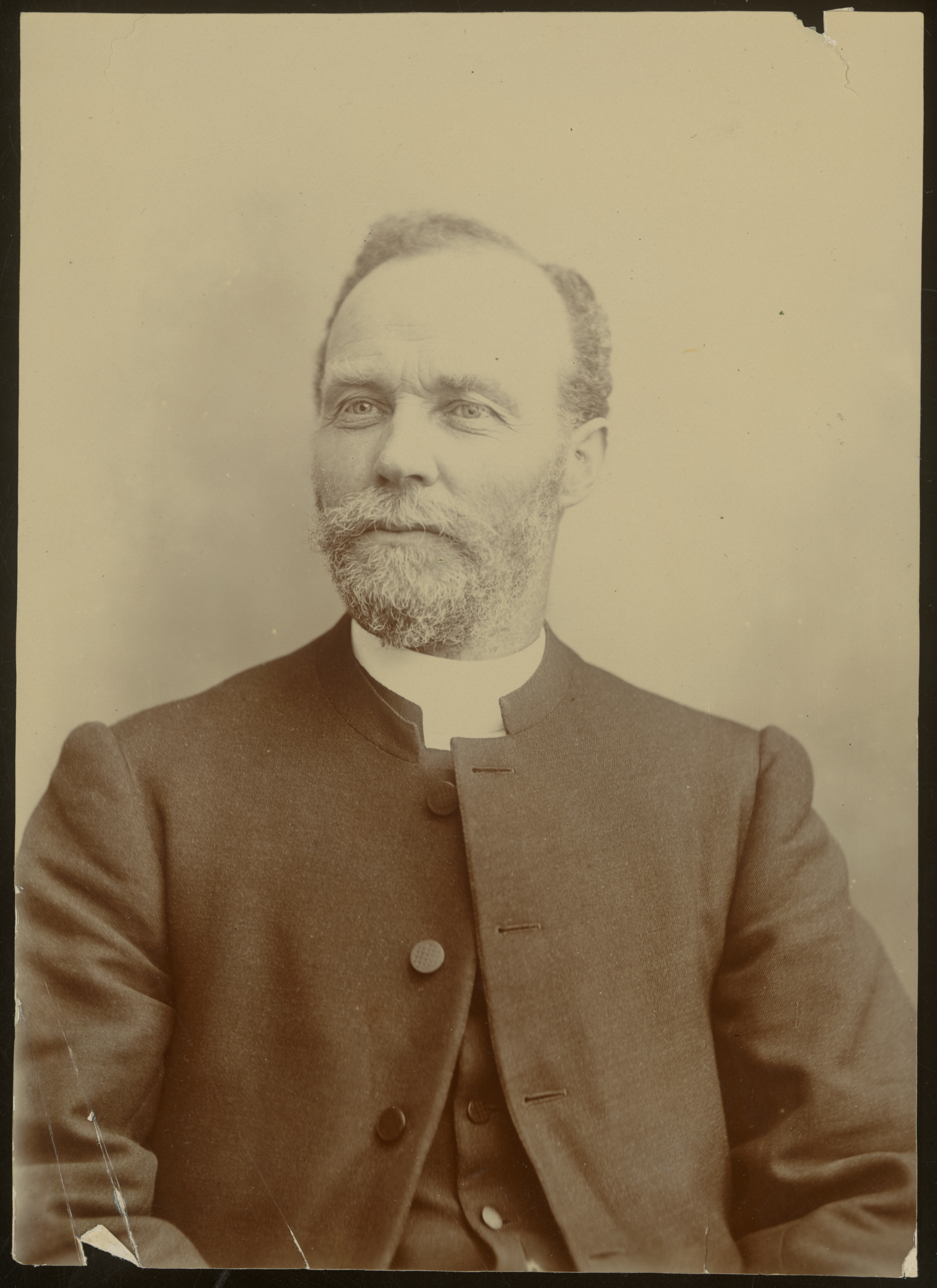
Don in 1906

Alexander Don (22 January 1857 – 2 November 1934) was a New Zealand Presbyterian minister, missionary and writer.

== Early life and family ==
Don was born in Ballarat, Victoria, Australia, on 22 January 1857, the eldest of the 10 children of Scottish immigrants John Don and his wife, Janet Nicol.

Alexander Don left school before the age of 10 to work in the Ballarat mining industry but was encouraged by a bible class leader to attend night school. At the age of 15 he was able to pass the exam to become a teacher. He remained a teacher for the next 8 years.

== In New Zealand ==
Through his church he heard about an appeal for volunteers for Pacific Mission by the Presbyterian Church of Otago and Southland so at 21 he came to Dunedin, New Zealand where he discovered that the position had already been taken. He then took up a teaching post at Port Chalmers school. After several months teaching he heard that the church needed someone to go to Canton (Guangzhou), China to learn Cantonese in order to do missionary work with the Chinese immigrants on the goldfields of Otago. In 1879 he resigned from teaching and went to Canton, returning in 1881 to study to become a Presbyterian minister at the Theological Hall, Knox College, Dunedin.

== Chinese mission ==
His first posts after Theological Hall were Riverton and then Lawrence. His early efforts to connect with the Chinese goldminers was not successful but he continued to study the Chinese closely for the next few years. 1883, he opened the first Chinese mission church in New Zealand. Also that year, he married Amelia Ann Warne, who he had met in Bendigo, Australia with whom he had seven children.

He began what he called the inland tours around Central Otago and Southland, each a journey of almost 2,000 miles, much of which he did by foot visiting the widely scattered Chinese miners.

His mission did not meet with great success, but his careful documentation of these journeys proved an extraordinarily valuable contribution to the knowledge of New Zealand history. His Roll of Chinese, a notebook containing the names and details (in Chinese) of more than 3500 New Zealand Chinese as well as four very detailed diaries and many photographs form the basis of the Ng New Zealand Chinese Heritage Collection which was added to the UNESCO's Memory of the World Register in 2017. These are held at the Presbyterian Research Centre, the Library and Archive of the Presbyterian Church of Aotearoa New Zealand in Dunedin.

In 1898 Alexander Don realized that many of the Chinese miners had returned to China, prompting him to consider the creation of an overseas mission there. He and Dr Joseph Ings travelled to Guangzhou to explore the possibility of establishing the Canton Villages Mission, a medical mission. He was welcomed by the returned migrants even though he was not universally liked by them. Don's fundraising and the goodwill of the returned Chinese were factors in the successful establishment of the Canton Villages Mission three years later.

== Retirement ==
He was appointed Presbyterian foreign missions secretary in 1913 which he continued until his retirement in 1923. He retired to Ophir in Central Otago and died on 2 November 1934 on a train while on his way to lodge his manuscript of his book Memories of the golden road: A history of the Presbyterian church in Central Otago with his publishers. This manuscript was lost, and was later reconstructed and published by his son-in-law, William Bennett.

== Bibliography ==
- Don, Alexander & Bennett, William. (1936) Memories of the golden road : a history of the Presbyterian Church in Central Otago. Dunedin: A.H. and A.W. Reed, 1936.
- Ng, James. "Don, Alexander", Dictionary of New Zealand Biography, at Te Ara - the Encyclopedia of New Zealand, 1993. Accessed 14 May 2019.
- Ng, James. (1993–99) Windows on a Chinese past (4 volumes). Dunedin: Otago Heritage Books.
