= Fletcher Challenge =

New Zealand based forestry and construction company

Fletcher Challenge Limited
- Type: Public company
- Industry: Construction, building, building products, energy, forestry, forestry products
- Founded: January 1981 (Merger of Fletcher Holdings and Challenge Corporation)
- Defunct: 2001
- Fate: Demerged and divested
- Headquarters: Wellington (1981–1987); Auckland (1987–2001), New Zealand
- Area served: New Zealand; Canada; United States; Chile
- Key people: Sir James Fletcher; Sir Ron Trotter; Hugh Fletcher
- Products: Pulp and paper, timber and timber products, natural gas, oil
- Services: Construction
- Divisions: Fletcher Energy, Fletcher Forests, Fletcher Building, Fletcher Construction

Fletcher Challenge was a multinational corporation from New Zealand. It was formed in 1981 by the merger of Fletcher Holdings, Challenge Corporation and Tasman Pulp and Paper. It had holdings in construction, forestry, building, and energy, initially just within New Zealand and then internationally as well, and at one time was the largest company in New Zealand. In 2001 it was split into three companies, Fletcher Challenge Forests, Fletcher Building (incorporating Fletcher Construction), and Rubicon.

== History ==
The corporation was formed in January 1981 with the mutual merger of Challenge Corporation, Fletcher Holdings and Tasman Pulp and Paper. It was initially based in Wellington's Challenge House, but later moved in 1987 to a new head office in Penrose, Auckland.

In 1987 the corporation acquired the state-owned enterprise Petrocorp, and created the Fletcher Energy division. Fletcher Energy's assets were subsequently sold to Shell New Zealand.

In November 1993 Fletcher Challenge's share market listing was split into two shares, the Ordinary Division and Forests Division. The Forests Division consisted of the corporation's wood plantation assets and forestry activities. The Ordinary Division consisted of the corporation's pulp and paper, energy and building assets.

In March 1996 the Ordinary Division was split further by creating three new shares – Fletcher Challenge Paper, Fletcher Challenge Building and Fletcher Challenge Energy. This structure lasted three years, until December 1999 when the Board of Directors of the company resolved to dismantle the Fletcher Challenge and establish separate companies.

In 2000 the Canadian pulp and paper assets were sold to Norske Skog to form NorskeCanada. In 2001 Fletcher Challenge was split into three companies, Fletcher Challenge Forests (later renamed Tenon), Fletcher Building (incorporating Fletcher Construction), and Rubicon.

A September 1996 investment in Central North Island Forest Partnership ended in receivership and is said to have contributed to the break up of Fletcher Challenge.

Battle of the Titans

== Battle of the Titans ==
The rise and fall of Fletcher Challenge and some of the principal personalities involved, including Hugh Fletcher and Sir Ronald Trotter is described in the book Battle of the Titans by Bruce Wallace.

== Subsidiary companies ==
Subsidiaries were:

- Australian Newsprint Mills
- Blandin Paper Co
- Cape Horn Methanol Ltd - bought 1991
- Cemac (Hong Kong) Ltd – founded 1971 now in Fletcher Building
- Challenge Deer Ltd
- Challenge Livestock Ltd
- Challenge Properties Ltd – joint venture
- Challenge Realty Ltd – formed 1994 as franchise name
- Challenge Seeds Ltd 1987–1994
- Challenge Wool Ltd
- Crown Paper Co Ltd
- Dinwiddie Construction Co
- Firth Industries Ltd
- Fletcher Challenge Canada Ltd
- Fletcher Challenge Methanol Ltd
- Fletcher Challenge Petroleum Ltd
- Fletcher Construction Australia Ltd
- Fletcher Construction Co Ltd
- Fletcher Construction Group Ltd
- Fletcher Development & Construction Co Ltd
- Fletcher Homes Ltd
- Fletcher Merchants Ltd
- Fletcher Pacific Construction Co Ltd
- Fletcher Panel Industries Ltd
- Fletcher Steel Sector
- Golden Bay Cement Co Ltd
- Jennings Group Ltd
- Pacific Coilcoaters Ltd
- Pacific Steel Ltd
- Petralgas Chemicals NZ Ltd 1980–2005
- Petroleum Corporation of New Zealand Ltd
- Pisa-Papel de Imprensa SA
- Placemakers Ltd
- Rural Bank
- Tasman Asia Shipping Co Ltd
- Tasman Chile SA
- Tasman Forestry Ltd
- Tasman Lumber Co Ltd
- Tasman Pulp & Paper
- The Rural Bank Ltd
- UK Paper plc
- William Guppy & Son Ltd
- Winstone Aggregates Ltd
- Winstone Industries Ltd
- Wiremakers Ltd
- Wright Schuchart Inc
- Wrightson
- Wrightson Bloodstock Ltd
- Wrightson NMA Ltd
