= Paul Gillard =

British actor

- Education: Royal Academy of Dramatic Art
- Occupations: stage and television actor

Paul Gillard was a British stage and television actor.

== Life ==
Cecil Gillard, born in Kenilworth, trained at RADA, graduating in 1962. Later, he turned professional under the stage name Paul Gillard. Throughout his career, he appeared in stage productions including Ivanov by Anton Chekhov, Private Lives by Noël Coward, and Say Who You Are by Willis Hall and Keith Waterhouse. He appeared in British television series such as Crane, Knock on Any Door, The Avengers and UFO.

== Acting credits ==
Production	Notes	Role
Crane	"The Unwanted" (1963)	Policeman
Moonstrike	"Try Out" (1963)	Bernard
No Cloak – No Dagger	1 episode (1963)	Doctor
It's Dark Outside	"One Man's Right" (1964)	Fascist
The Plane Makers	"The Smiler" (1964); "A Condition of Sale" (1964)	Draughtsman; Jimmy
Sergeant Cork	"The Case of the African Murder" (1964)	Captain Fraser
It's a Woman's World	"Jean" (1964)	Bill
Riviera Police	"Who Can Catch a Falling Star?" (1965)	Barman
ITV Play of the Week	"Ivanov" (1966)	Young man 2
Knock on Any Door	"The Paris Trip" (1966)	Hotel Porter
The Avengers	"From Venus with Love" (1967)	Ernest Cosgrove
Wild, Wild Women	"Pilot" (1968)	Waiter
Judge Dee	"The Haunted Pavilion" (1969)	Head Constable
The Expert	"The Sardonic Smile" (1969)	Pharmacist
The Doctors	1 episode (1969)	Reg Warner
UFO	"Identified" (1970)	Kurt Mahler
