= Andrew Cameron (Presbyterian minister) =

Presbyterian minister, educationalist, community leader (1855–1925)

Cameron in 1913

Andrew Cameron (16 February 1855–19 May 1925) was a New Zealand presbyterian minister, educationalist and community leader. He served as Moderator of the General Assembly of the Presbyterian Church of New Zealand in 1912.

== Life ==
He was born in Paisley, Renfrewshire, Scotland on 16 February 1855. He was the son of Andrew Cameron, a baker, and his wife, Margaret Muir. In 1863 the family emigrated to New Zealand on the SS City of Dunedin arriving at Port Chalmers on 3 September. His father set up business in Sawyers Bay.

In the summer of 1875 he matriculated at the University of Otago studying Theology and Zoology. From 1879 until 1881 he studied at the Theological College in Dunedin. He then returned to Scotland to complete his theological studies in Edinburgh. Part of his final year was spent in Germany with studies at the University of Jena and University of Leipzig.

In December 1884 he was ordained as minister of Andersons Bay Presbyterian Church in New Zealand.

He was founder and first chairman of the Knox College, Otago, of which his in-law, James Fletcher, was the builder. This relationship was echoed in the building of Allen Hall at the University of Otago which Fletcher also built.

From 1912 to 1925 he was Chancellor of the University of Otago. He was founder of the John McGlashan College.

He retired in 1919 and died in Christchurch on 19 May 1925.

== Family ==
In November 1885 he married Mary Jane McKellar at Invercargill. They had three daughters and three sons.
