= University of Canterbury =

Public research university in Christchurch, New Zealand

- Te Whare Wānanga o Waitaha (Māori)
- Coat of arms
- Former name: Canterbury College
- Motto: (Unofficial) Latin: Ergo tua rura manebunt (therefore the lands shall remain yours)
- Type: Public research university
- Established: 1873; 153 years ago
- Affiliations: UCSA; SVA; Ngāi Tahu; Crusaders (rugby union)
- Academic affiliations: ACU; AACSB; AMBA; EQUIS; ENZ; NZLS; CA ANZ; CPA Australia
- Endowment: NZD $142 million (2022)
- Budget: NZ$588.3 million (2025)
- Chancellor: Amy Adams
- Vice-Chancellor: Cheryl de la Rey
- Academic staff: 1,099 (2025)
- Administrative staff: 1,427 (2025)
- Students: 27,121 (2025)
- Undergraduates: 15,575 (2025)
- Postgraduates: 3,820 (2025)
- Location: Christchurch, New Zealand; 43°31′24″S 172°34′55″E
- Campus: Suburban and Urban 87 hectares (210 acres)
- Language: English and Māori
- Student Magazine: Canta
- Colours: UC Murrey Red and UC Gold
- Website: www.canterbury.ac.nz

The University of Canterbury (Māori: Te Whare Wānanga o Waitaha) is a public research university based in Christchurch, New Zealand. It was founded in 1873 as Canterbury College, the first constituent college of the University of New Zealand. It is New Zealand's second-oldest university.

Its original campus was in the Christchurch Central City, but in 1961 it became an independent university and began moving out of its original neo-Gothic buildings, which were re-purposed as the Christchurch Arts Centre. The move was completed on 1 May 1975 and the university now operates its main campus in the Christchurch suburb of Ilam.

The university offers bachelors, masters, and doctoral degrees in, among others, Arts, Commerce, Education (physical education), Fine Arts, Forestry, Health Sciences, Law, Criminal Justice, Music, Social Work, Speech and Language Pathology, Sports Coaching and Teaching.

== History ==
=== Canterbury College, 1873–1960 ===
On 16 June 1873, the university was founded in the centre of Christchurch as Canterbury College, the first constituent college of the University of New Zealand and was funded by the then Canterbury Provincial Council. It became the second institution in New Zealand providing tertiary-level education (following the University of Otago, established in 1869), and the fourth in Australasia. It was founded on the basis of the Oxbridge college system, but it differed from Oxbridge in that it admitted female students from its foundation. Its foundation professors arrived in 1874, namely, Charles Cook (Mathematics, University of Melbourne, St John's College, Cambridge), Alexander Bickerton (Chemistry and Physics, School of Mining, London), and John Macmillan Brown (University of Glasgow, Balliol College, Oxford). A year later the first lectures began and in 1875 the first graduations took place. In 1880, Helen Connon was the first woman to graduate from the college, and in 1894, Āpirana Ngata became the first Māori-born student to graduate with a degree. The School of Art was founded in 1882, followed by the faculties of Arts, Science, Commerce, and Law in 1921, and Mental, Moral, and Social Sciences in 1924. The Students' Union, now known as the University of Canterbury Students Association, was founded in 1929 operating out of the Arts Centre of Christchurch Old Student Union Building, and the first edition of the student magazine Canta was published in 1930. In 1933, the name changed from Canterbury College to Canterbury University College.

Founding professors of Canterbury College

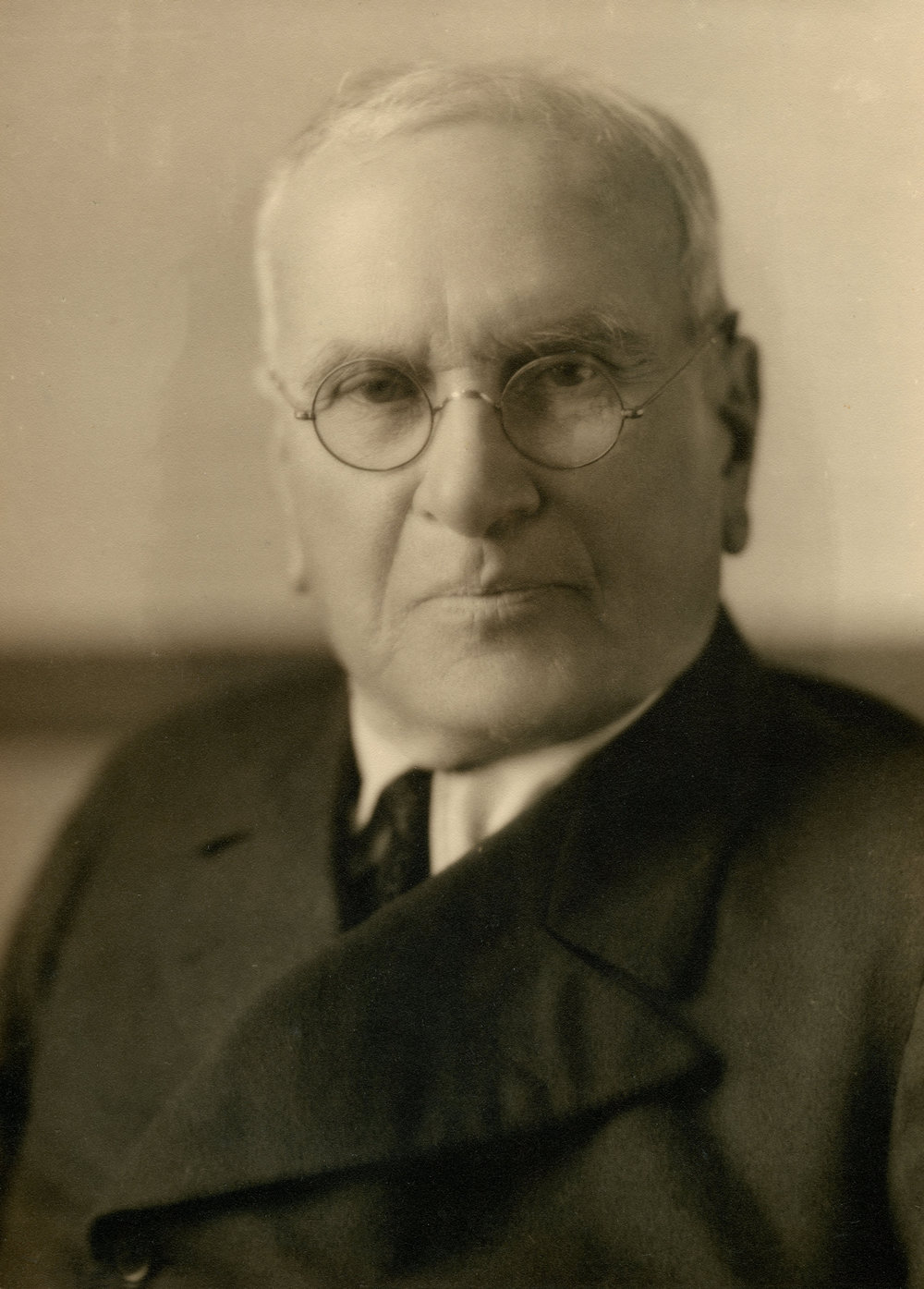
John Macmillan Brown

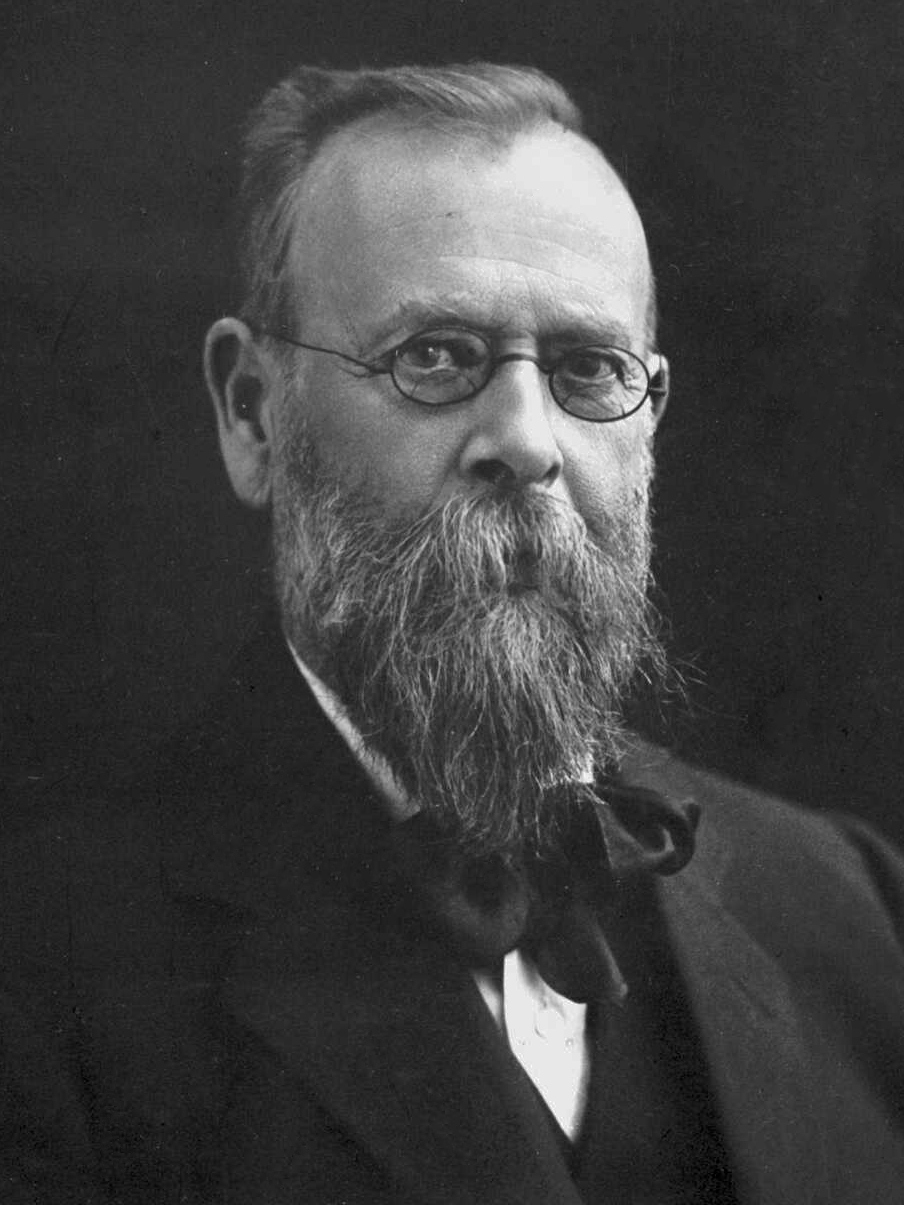
Alexander Bickerton

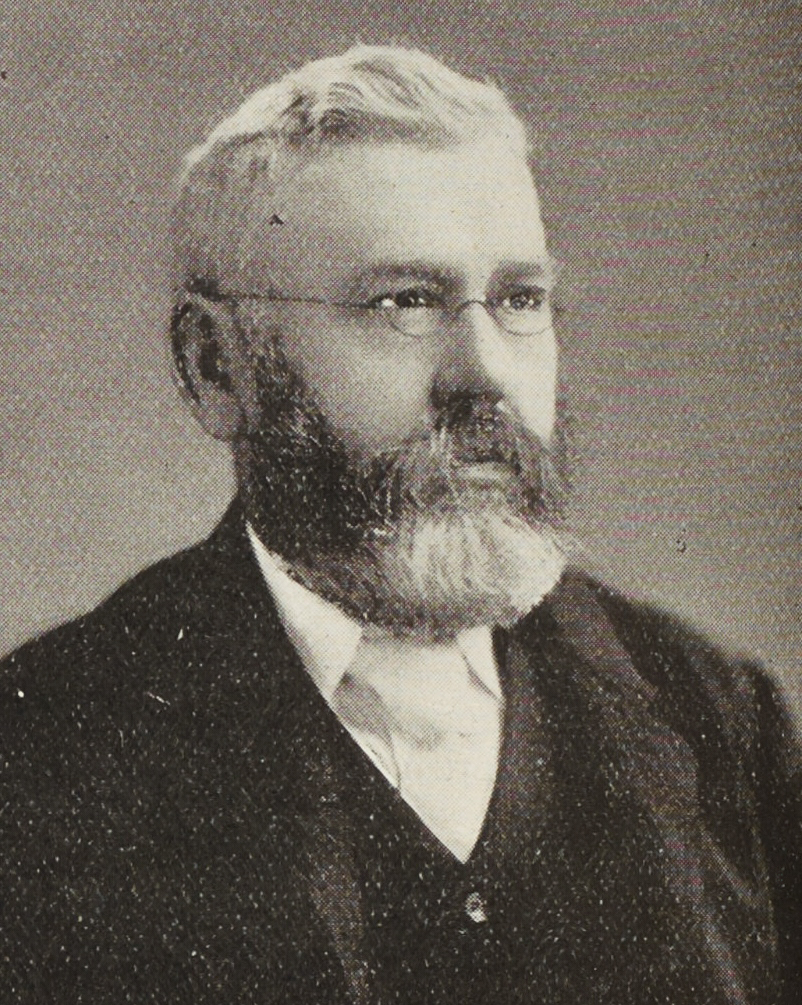
Charles Cook

College House, a student dormitory that maintains its old tradition by adopting the Oxbridge college system, broke away from Christ's College in 1957 and relocated to the Ilam suburb of Christchurch in 1966 as a hall of residence at the University of Canterbury. In 1957 the name changed again to the University of Canterbury.

=== Independence, 1961–2009 ===
Until 1961, the university formed part of the University of New Zealand (UNZ), and issued degrees in its name. That year saw the dissolution of the federal system of tertiary education in New Zealand, and the University of Canterbury became an independent University awarding its own degrees. Upon the UNZ's demise, Canterbury Agricultural College became a constituent college of the University of Canterbury, as Lincoln College. Lincoln College became independent in 1990 as a full university in its own right and is now known as Lincoln University.

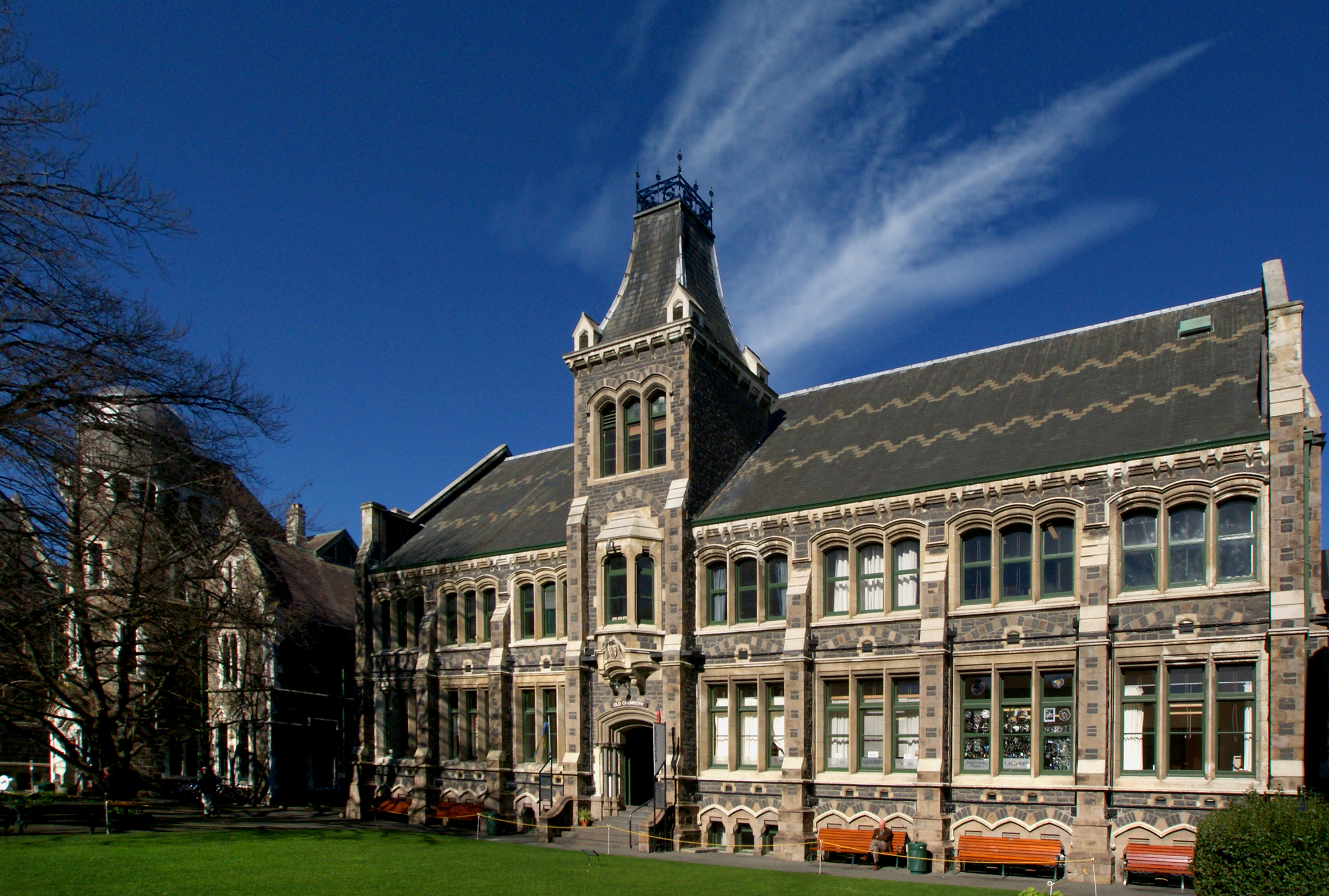
Old University of Canterbury campus, now the Christchurch Arts Centre.

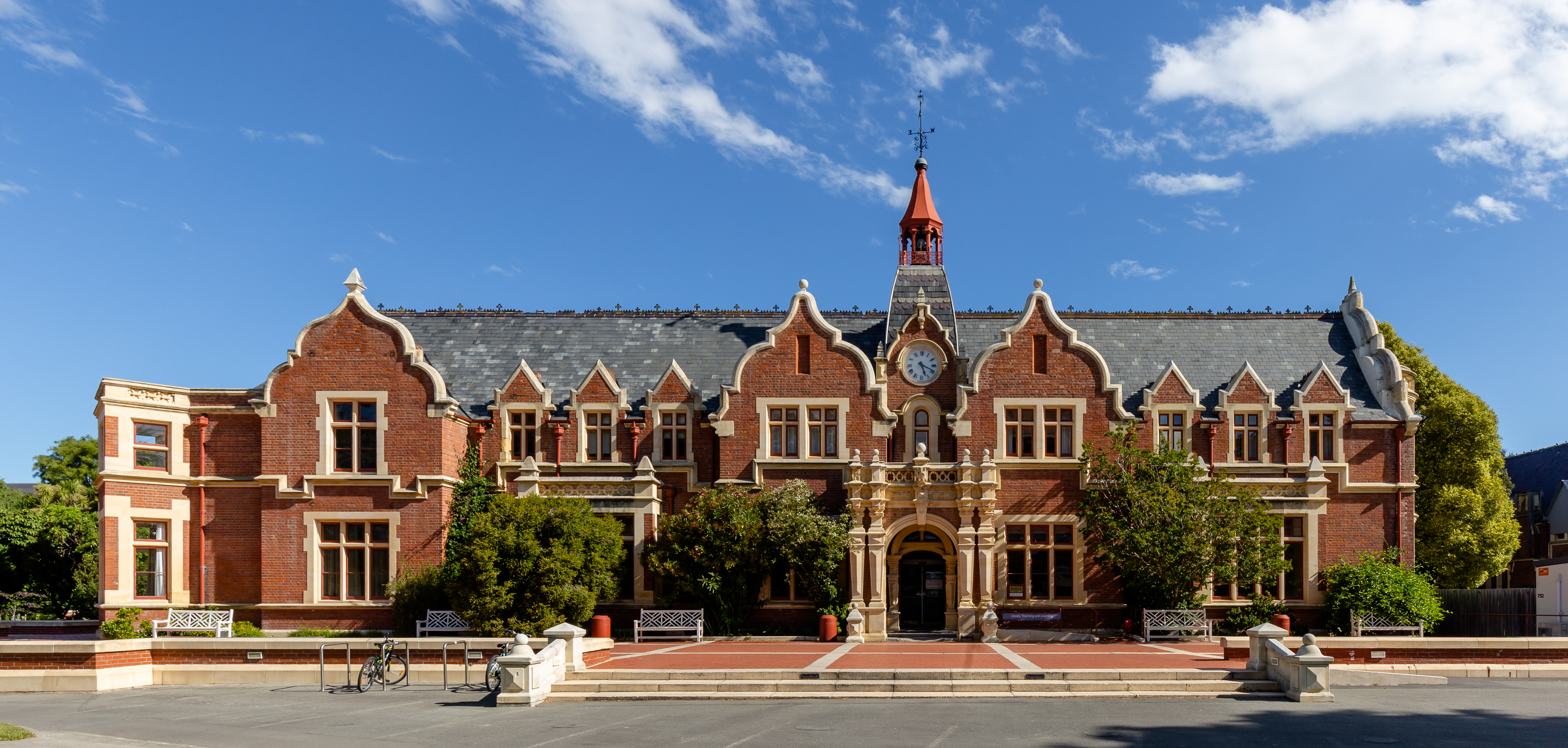
Ivey Hall at Lincoln University formerly a constituent college of the University of Canterbury.

Relocation to Ilam campus

Over the period from 1961 to 1974, the university campus relocated from the centre of the city to its much larger current site in the suburb of Ilam. 1973 saw the university celebrate its centenary, during which the neo-Gothic buildings of the old campus were gifted to the City of Christchurch, which became the site of the Christchurch Arts Centre, a hub for arts, crafts and entertainment in Christchurch. 1974 also marked the opening of the James Hight Library, which at the time, was New Zealand's largest university building. Ilam's three university halls of residence were renamed University Hall in 1974, and the student dormitory was used as the Athletes Village dormitory for the 1974 British Commonwealth Games hosted in Christchurch.

In 2004, the university underwent restructuring into four Colleges and a School of Law, administering a number of schools and departments (though a number of departments have involvement in cross-teaching in numerous academic faculties). For many years the university worked closely with the Christchurch College of Education, leading to a full merger in 2007, establishing a fifth College.

=== Post-earthquakes, 2010–2022 ===
On 4 September 2010 at 4:35 am local time an earthquake struck the South Island of New Zealand with a moment magnitude of 7.1; several aftershocks followed the main event, the strongest of which was a magnitude 6.3 shock known as the Christchurch earthquake that occurred nearly six months later on 22 February 2011. Although there was no serious injuries to staff or students on campus and only minor damage to buildings, the initial quake closed the university for a week, and the library was shut for months while shelves were repaired and half a million books placed back on shelves. The Student Volunteer Army was a group of around 10,000 university students and others who worked over a period of months to help clean up liquefaction.

In the months following the earthquake, the university lost 25 per cent of its first-year students and 8 per cent of continuing students. The number of international students, who pay much higher fees and were a major source of revenue, dropped by 30 per cent. In October 2011, staff were encouraged to take voluntary redundancies. As well in September 2011, plans were announced to demolish some University buildings that were damaged from an earthquake.

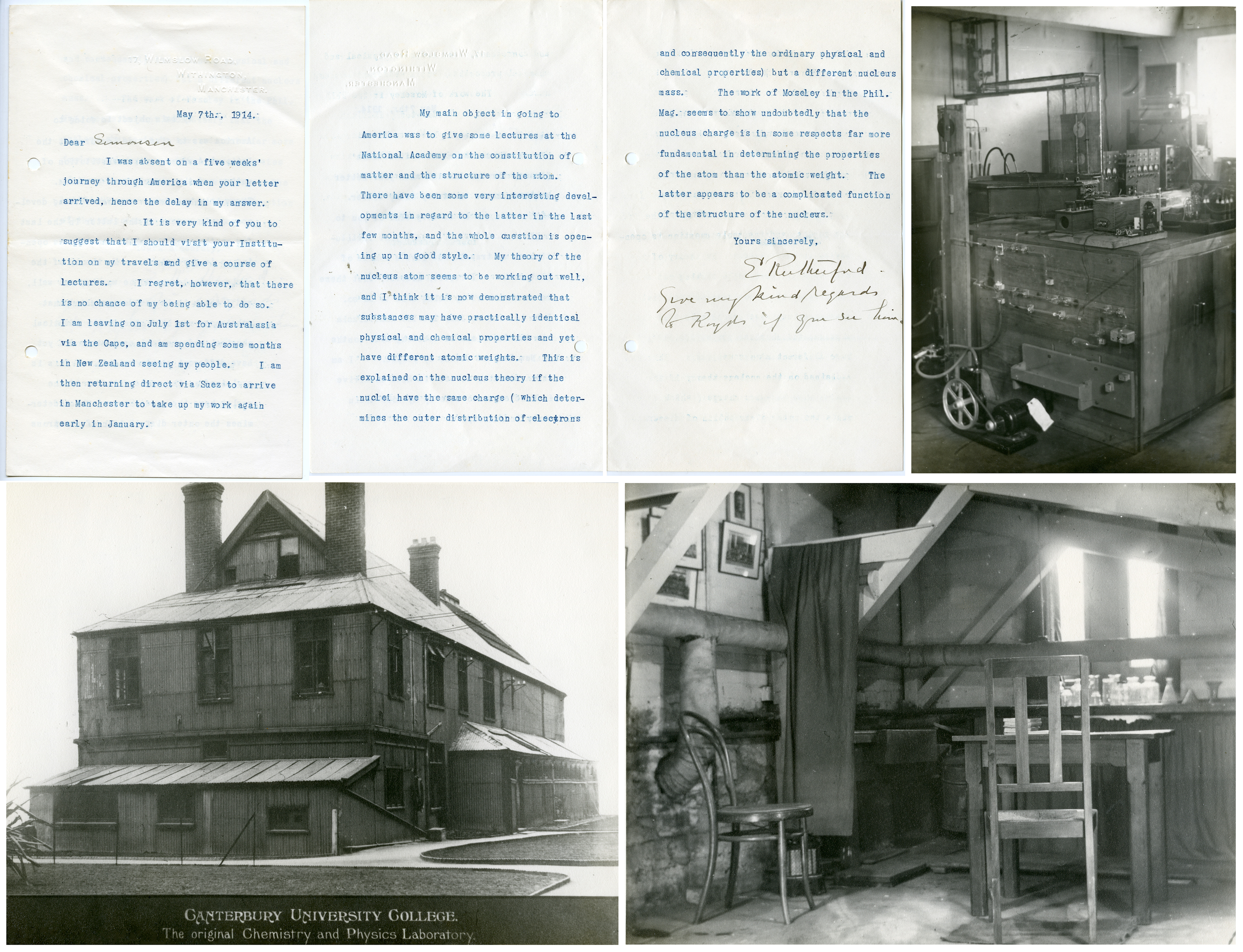
The original Chemistry and Physics Laboratory at Canterbury College, Christchurch, NZ. Rutherford worked here as a student under the late Prof. Bickerton.

By 2013, the university had lost 22 per cent of its students. However, a record number of 886 PhD students were enrolled at the University of Canterbury as of 2013. Other New Zealand universities, apparently defying an informal agreement, launched billboard and print advertising campaigns in the earthquake-ravaged city to recruit University of Canterbury students who were finding it difficult to study there. In 2013 the New Zealand Government also agreed to provide $260m to support the university's rebuild programme.

Student numbers were steadily on the rise, with a 4.5% increase in students enrolled from 2013 to 2016. International numbers also increased, nearing pre-earthquake figures at 1,134 enrolled in 2016.

In March 2016, Vice-Chancellor Dr Rod Carr said in The Press newspaper: "In 2014, [students] wanted to leave Christchurch and went to Wellington, Otago and into the workforce. Now we're retaining Christchurch school leavers and we're getting our fair share of provincial students, as well as attracting greater numbers from the Auckland region." "Living on or near the UC campus, and having a lifestyle that can take you from lectures to skifields in 90 minutes or the beach in 20 minutes, is much more appealing and affordable than living in Auckland."

In January 2017, the University of Canterbury released its campus master plan – 50 building and landscape projects proposed over three stages by 2045, the cost could exceed $2bn. In a comment to The Press, Rod Carr said that the plans were proof the university was moving away from the falling enrolments post-earthquake.

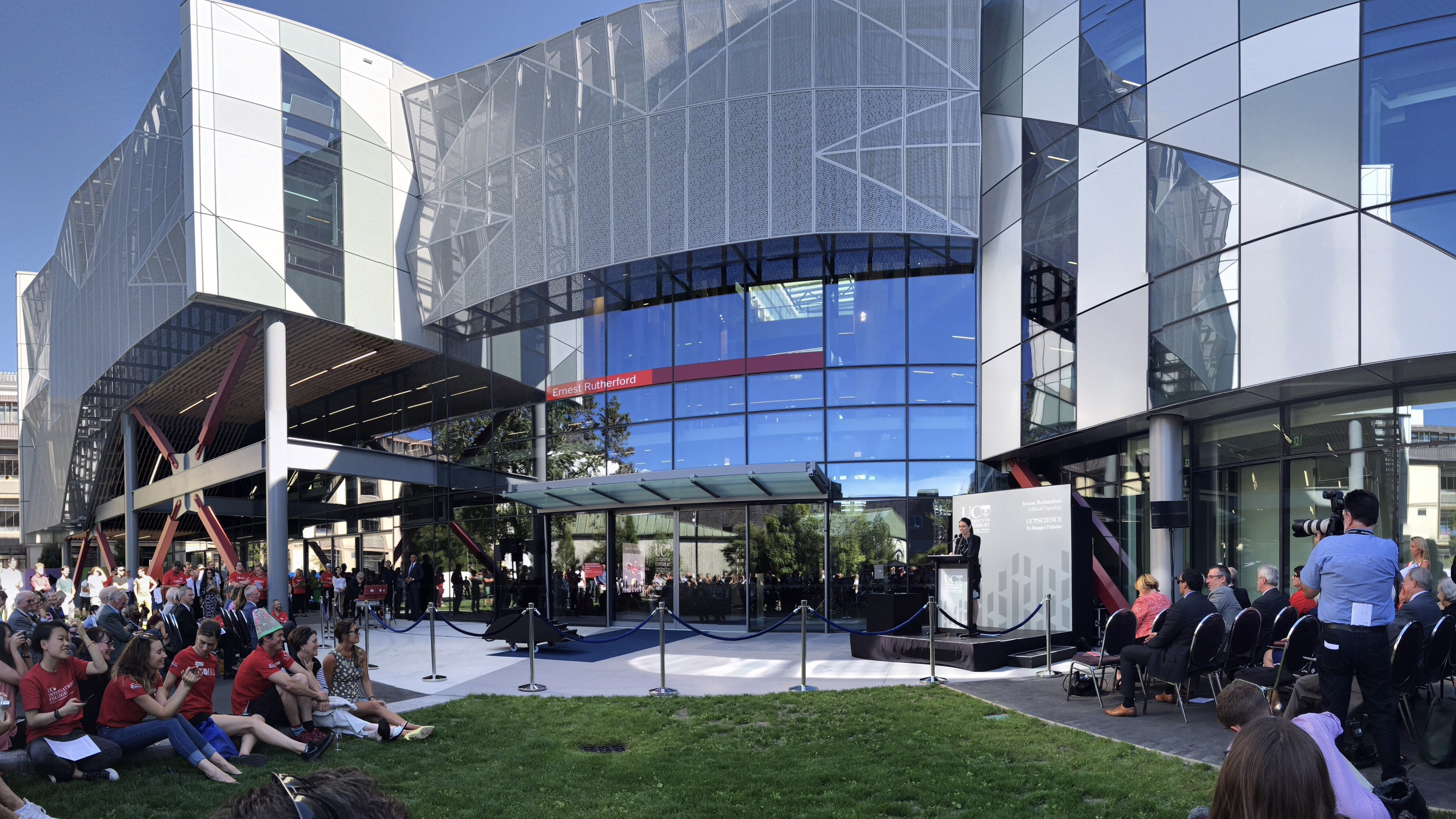
New Zealand Prime Minister Jacinda Ardern opened the Ernest Rutherford Regional Science and Innovation Centre at the University of Canterbury on 15 February 2018, home of the College of Science.

=== 150th anniversary, 2023–present ===
The University of Canterbury celebrated its 150th anniversary in 2023. In the same year the university experienced a surge in enrolments, reaching a record high of 21,361 students by late March, compared to 20,223 at the same period in the previous year. Among these figures, UC counted 19,975 domestic students, witnessing a substantial increase from the preceding year's count. Concurrently, the international student body also expanded to 1,393, marking a rise from 1,098 in the prior year. This growth in enrolment stands in contrast to a decline in domestic student numbers across all five North Island universities during this period. According to a spokesperson for the university, in 2023 every affiliated hall was "at 100% occupancy" and "may be a record-breaker for highest number of enrolments".

== Campuses ==
The University of Canterbury has three campuses spread throughout the city of Christchurch:

- Ilam Campus: The university has a main campus of 76 hectares (190 acres) at Ilam, a suburb of Christchurch about 5 kilometres (3.1 mi) from the centre of the city. The Ilam campus maintains three libraries with the Central Library (Māori: Te Puna Mātauraka o Waitaha) housed in the tallest building on campus, the 11-storey Puaka–James Hight Building. The Ilam campus is where the Faculties of Education, Health, Science, Engineering, Business, Law and Arts are based. The University of Canterbury Students' Association is based there in the Haere roa building. The Ilam Campus is home to cafes and restaurants as well as a pharmacy, bookshop, the UC rec centre and the UC Health centre.
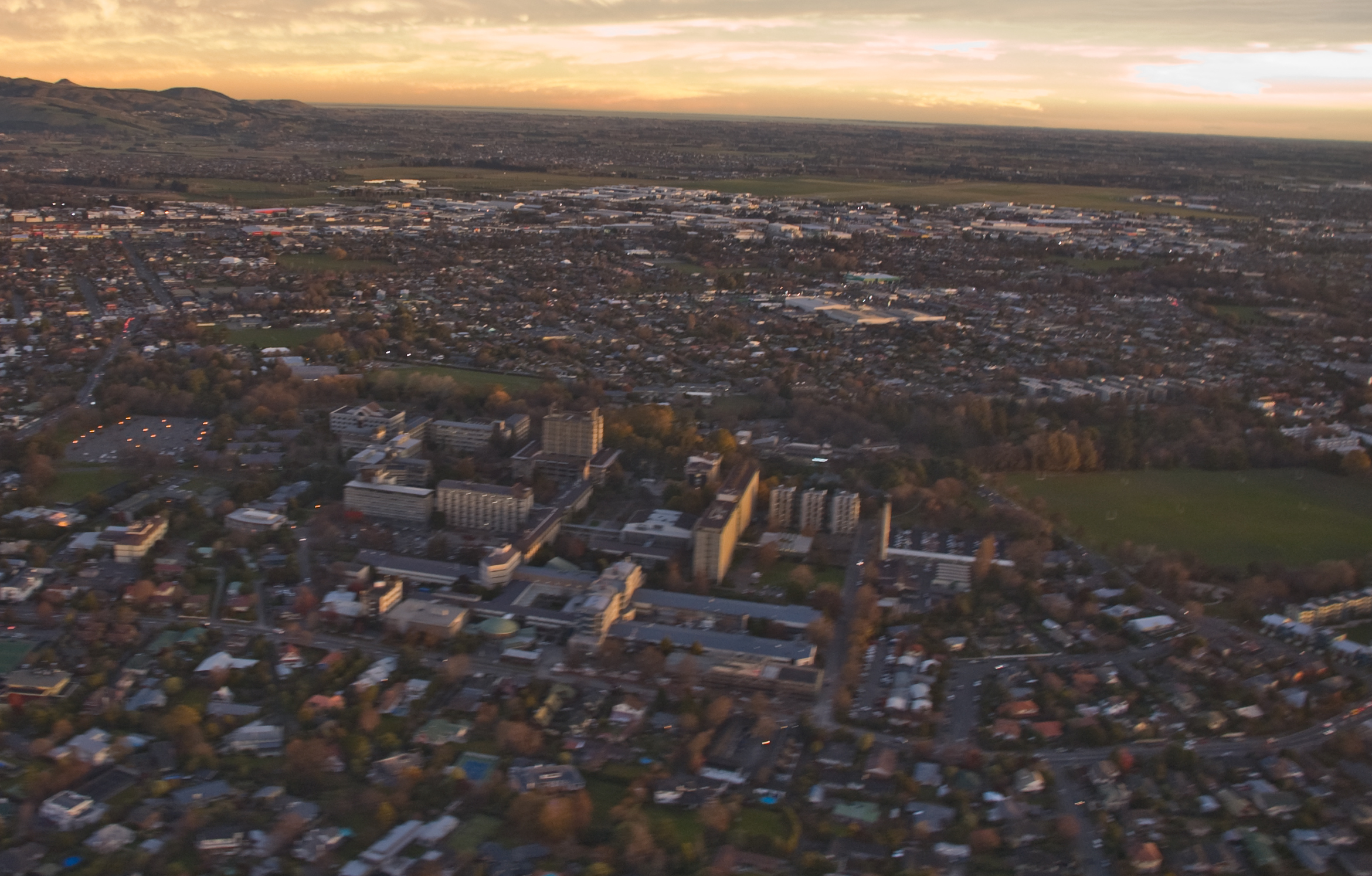
  Aerial view of the Ilam Campus and Christchurch, with the campus prominently featured in the foreground.
- Dovedale Campus: The Dovedale Campus is 11 hectares (27 acres) and became a part of the University of Canterbury when the Christchurch College of Education (a specialist teacher training institution) merged on 1 January 2007. The Dovedale campus is located adjacent to the Ilam campus and is off Dovedale avenue. The campus consists of the old Henry Field Library, The Christchurch College of English, Ilam early Learning Centre and Hayashi and Sonoda student residences. The Faculty of Education also maintains a presence here.
- City Campus: The Christchurch City Campus is made up of the Christchurch Arts Centre and the Manawa building which is a part of the Faculty of Health. Music and Classics are again taught from the Christchurch Arts Centre in the old chemistry building, and within the new Manawa building in Christchurch city health and education are taught. The city campus also includes the Teece Museum of Classical Antiquities – home of the James Logie Memorial Collection.

The university also maintains additional small campuses in Nelson, Tauranga and Timaru, and teaching centres in Greymouth, New Plymouth, Rotorua and Timaru. The university has staff in regional information offices in Nelson, Timaru, and Auckland.

=== Libraries ===
The UC Library was first established at Canterbury College in 1879. Today there are three libraries on campus each covering different subject areas.

Central library

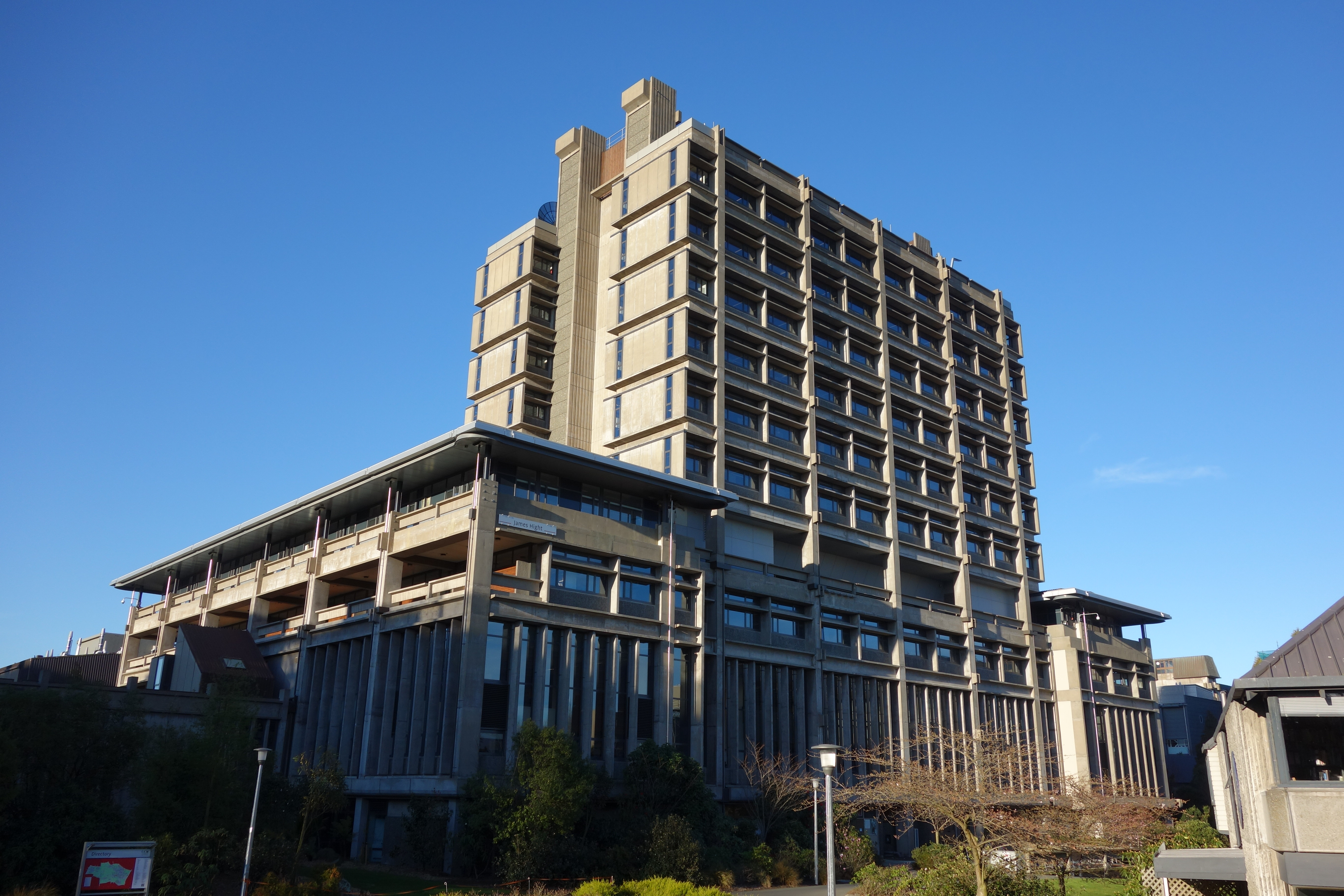
The 11-storey, Puaka-James Hight library at the University of Canterbury

The Central Library (Māori: Te Puna Mātauraka o Waitaha) – is housed in the Puaka–James Hight Building that is designed in the brutalist style architecture. In 1974, the old city campus library moved to the Ilam campus and was housed in the newly constructed James Hight building, originally named after former Canterbury professor James Hight. The building was renamed Puaka-James Hight in 2014, after the brightest star in the cluster Matariki, to reflect the growing strength of UC's relationship with Ngāi Tahu and the mana of Te Ao Māori at the heart of the university's campus. The University of Canterbury Central Library is the largest university library in New Zealand. The Central Library has collections of over 2 million physical items including books, archives, journals and a miscellany of other items that support research and teaching in Humanities, Social Sciences, Law, Commerce, Music, Fine Arts and Antarctic Studies.

- The Henry Field Library (named for the New Zealand Educationalist Henry Edward Field) on the old Christchurch College of Education site joined the fold when the university and Christchurch College of Education merged. However, the Education collection was incorporated into the collections within the Puaka–James Hight Building, and Henry Field is now a library store at the campus off Dovedale Avenue.
- A separate Law library was established within the James Hight building, it was then relocated to the new Law building (Mere Mere). However, after the 2011 Christchurch earthquake it returned to the Puaka–James Hight Building and integrated into the Central Library collection. The Mere Mere Building still operates as the Law and Business Building however it is no longer home to the law library.

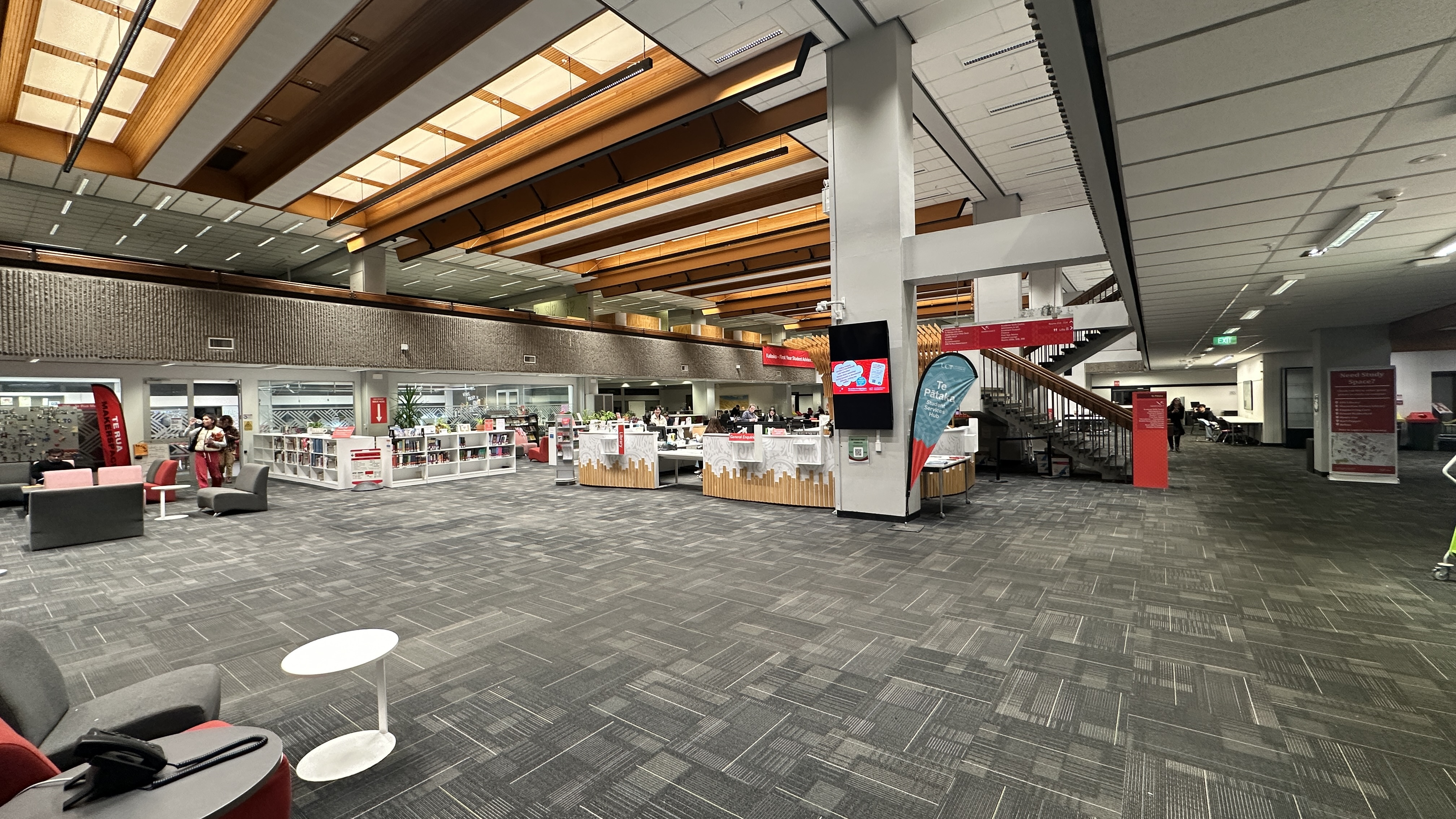
2nd and 3rd floor of Puaka–James Hight Building in 2025

EPS library

The EPS Library (Engineering and Physical Sciences Library, Māori: Kā Puna Pūkahataka me te Pūtaiao) supports research and teaching in Engineering, Forestry and Sciences. With the move to the Ilam campus, the Library was split. First the Engineering Library, and later the Physical Sciences Library, moving to the new campus however the old Physical Sciences Library closed and its collections moved to the Engineering Library now called the EPS Library.

Macmillian Brown library

The Macmillan Brown Library (Māori: Te Puna Rakahau o Macmillan Brown) is a research library, archive, and art gallery that specialises in collecting items related to New Zealand and Pacific Islands history. It holds over 100,000 published items including books, audio-visual recordings, and various manuscripts, photographs, works of art, architectural drawings and ephemera. The Macmillan Brown Library's art collection also has over 5,000 works, making it one of the largest collections in the Canterbury Region. Some notable items in its collections include copies of Māori Land Court Records, official and government documents from various Pacific Islands states, trade union records, and the personal papers of various Members of Parliament and government ministers. The library is named after John Macmillan Brown, a prominent Canterbury academic who helped found the library, allocated a large proportion of his fortune to the Macmillan Brown Library.

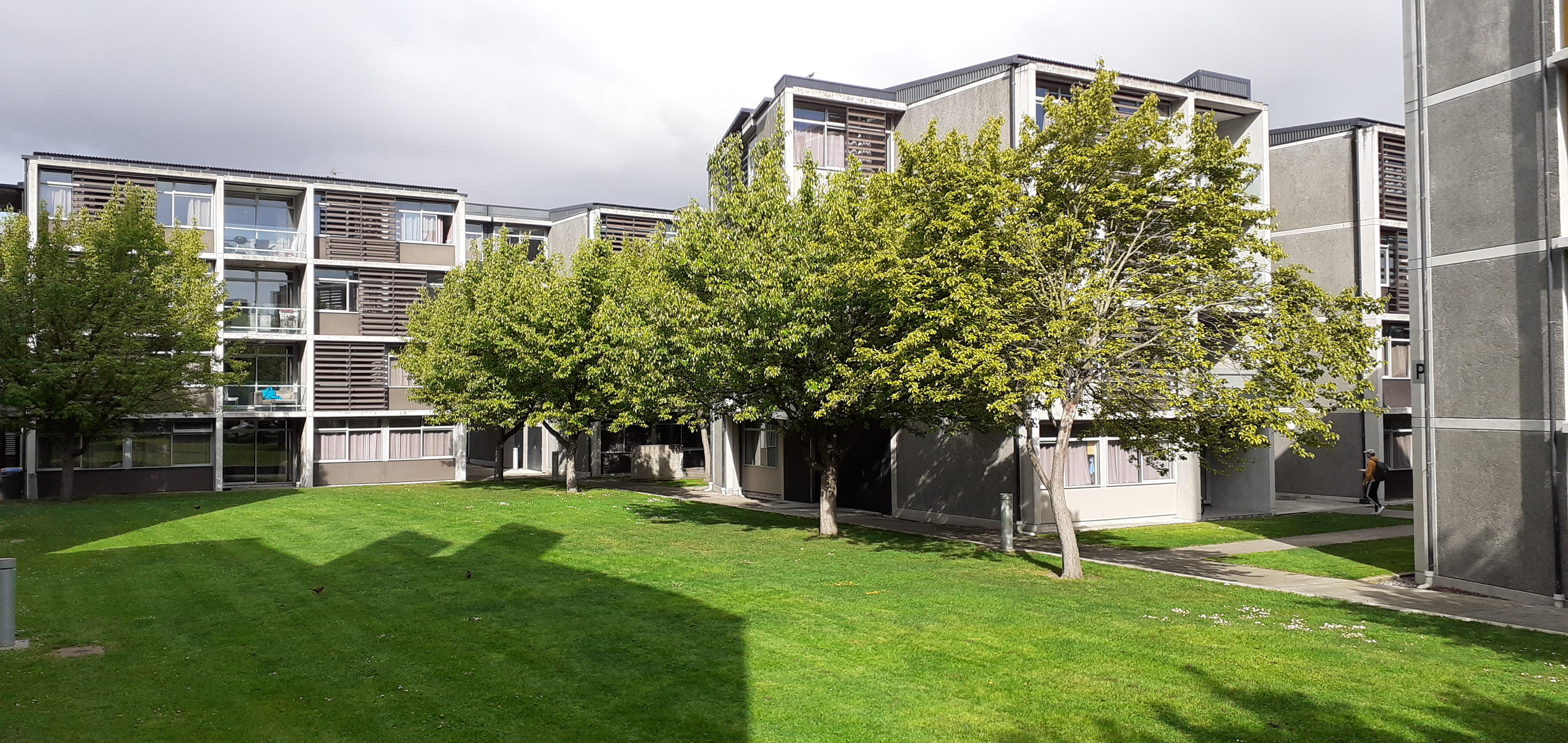
Grounds of Ilam Apartments at the University of Canterbury

=== Student accommodation ===
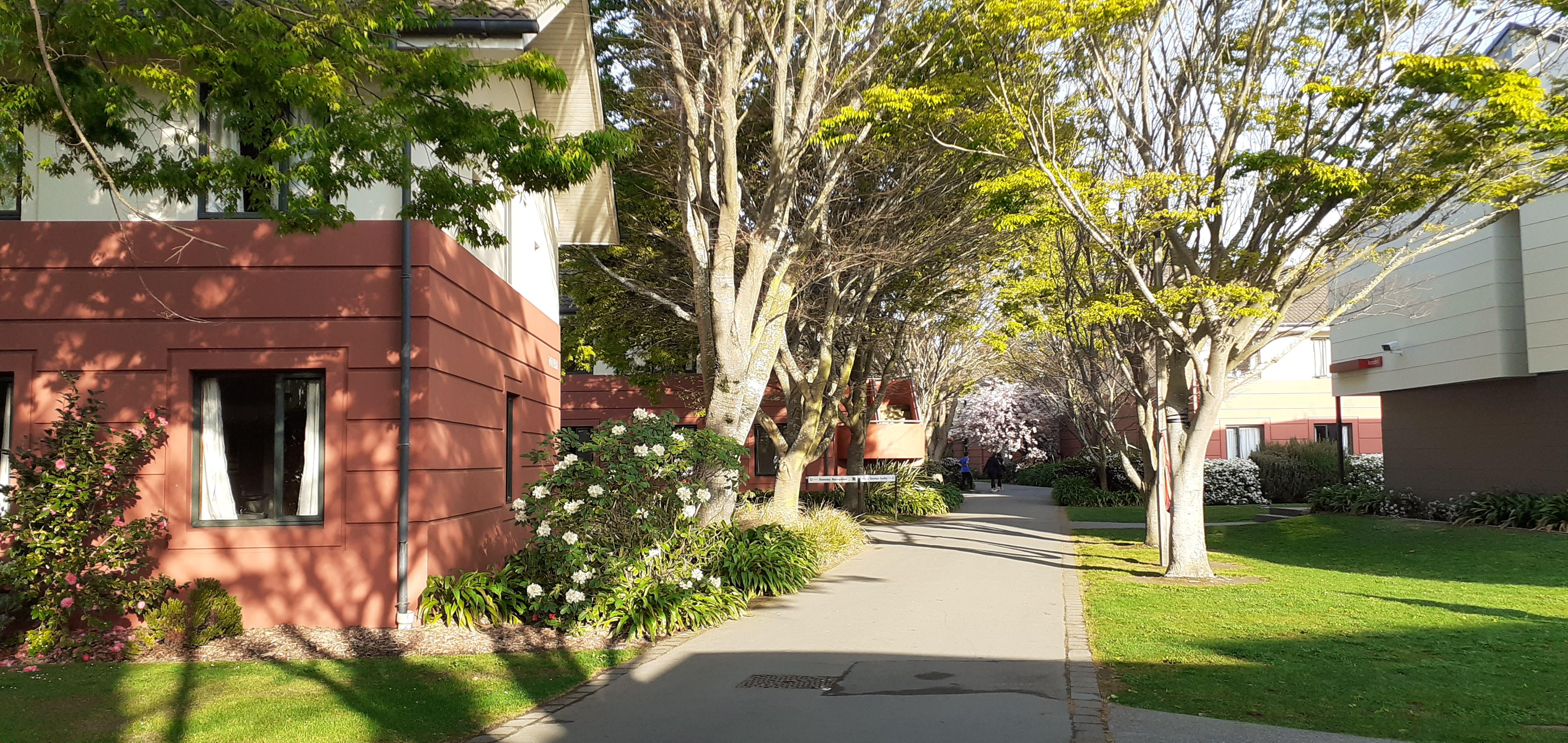
The grounds at Sonoda, taken in October 2019

The university has ten student residences throughout its Ilam and Dovedale campuses: five fully-catered halls of residence exclusively for first-year undergraduate students: Arcady, College House, Rochester and Rutherford, Tupuānuku and University Hall; and five other self-catered student accommodation houses which are home to both undergraduate and postgraduate students: Sonoda Christchurch Campus, Hayashi, Kirkwood Avenue, Waimairi Village and Ilam Apartments. The largest, Ilam Apartments, houses 831 students during the academic year. Some of the halls at UC have storied histories; Tupuānuku is named for the star of the same name that is connected to food grown in the ground in the cluster Matariki in Māori Mythology; Rochester and Rutherford is named for former alumni Ernest Rutherford and John Fisher Bishop of Rochester; while Arcady, previously Bishop Julius Hall, was founded by the first Archbishop of New Zealand, Churchill Julius; additionally, College House is the oldest residential college in New Zealand.

The University also has a new hall, Tupuārangi, planned for completion in 2026. At Tupuārangi, every room will have its own ensuite.

=== Field facilities ===
The University of Canterbury has the most field stations of any New Zealand university. The Field Facilities Centre administers four of these field stations:

- Cass Field Station – Established in 1914 to give students and researchs access to montane grasslands, scrub, riverbed, scree, beech forest, swamp, bog, lake, stream and alpine habitats.
- Harihari Field Station – Access to native forests, streams.
- Westport Field Station – for study of the West Coast of New Zealand, particularly mining.
- Kaikōura Field Station – Kaikōura represents an important transition zone for flora and fauna, particularly in the marine environment, with Kowhai bush and associated rich bird life close by.

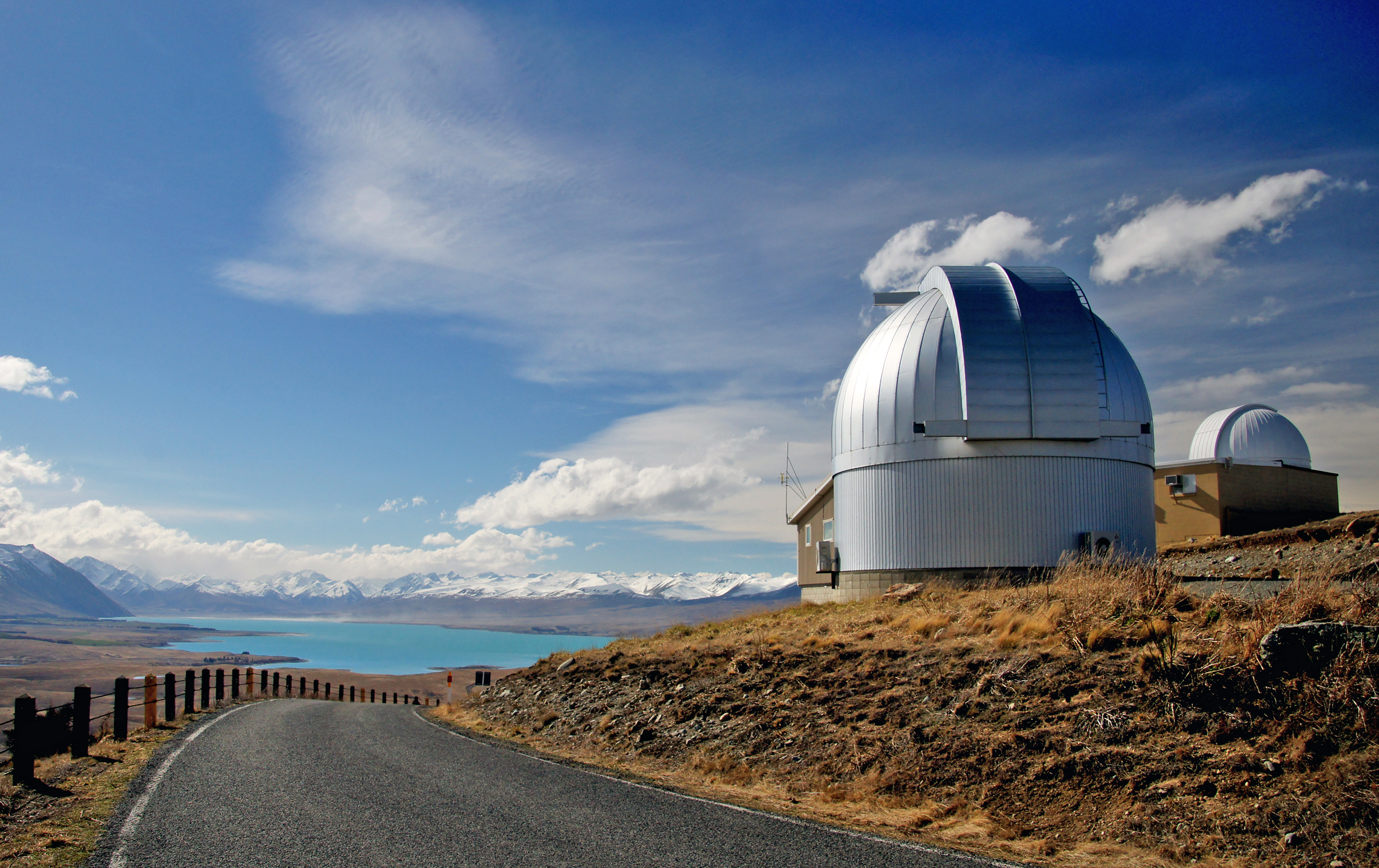
Mount John University of Canterbury Observatory, opened 1965

The university and its project partners also operate an additional field station in the Nigerian Montane Forests Project; this field station stands on the Ngel Nyaki forest edge in Nigeria.

The Department of Physical and Chemical Sciences runs its own field laboratories:

- Mount John University Observatory at Lake Tekapo for optical astronomical research
- Birdlings Flat radar facility
- Scott Base radar facility
- Cracroft Caverns ring laser facility

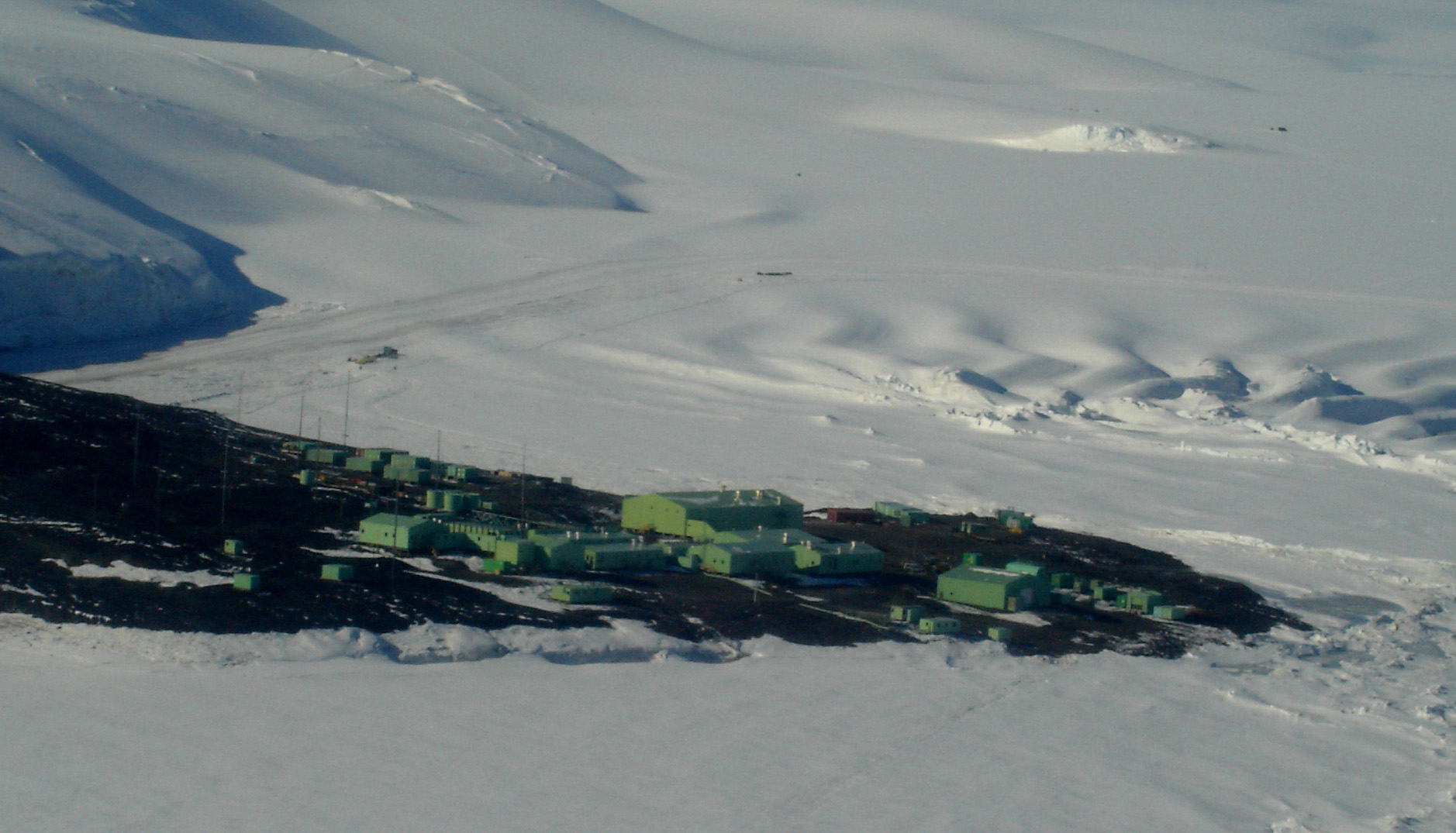
Scott Base, used by University of Canterbury postgraduate Antarctic studies students.

The Department of Physical and Chemical Sciences also has involvement in the Southern African Large Telescope and is a member of the IceCube collaboration which is installing a neutrino telescope at the South Pole.

=== Teece Museum of Classical Antiquities ===
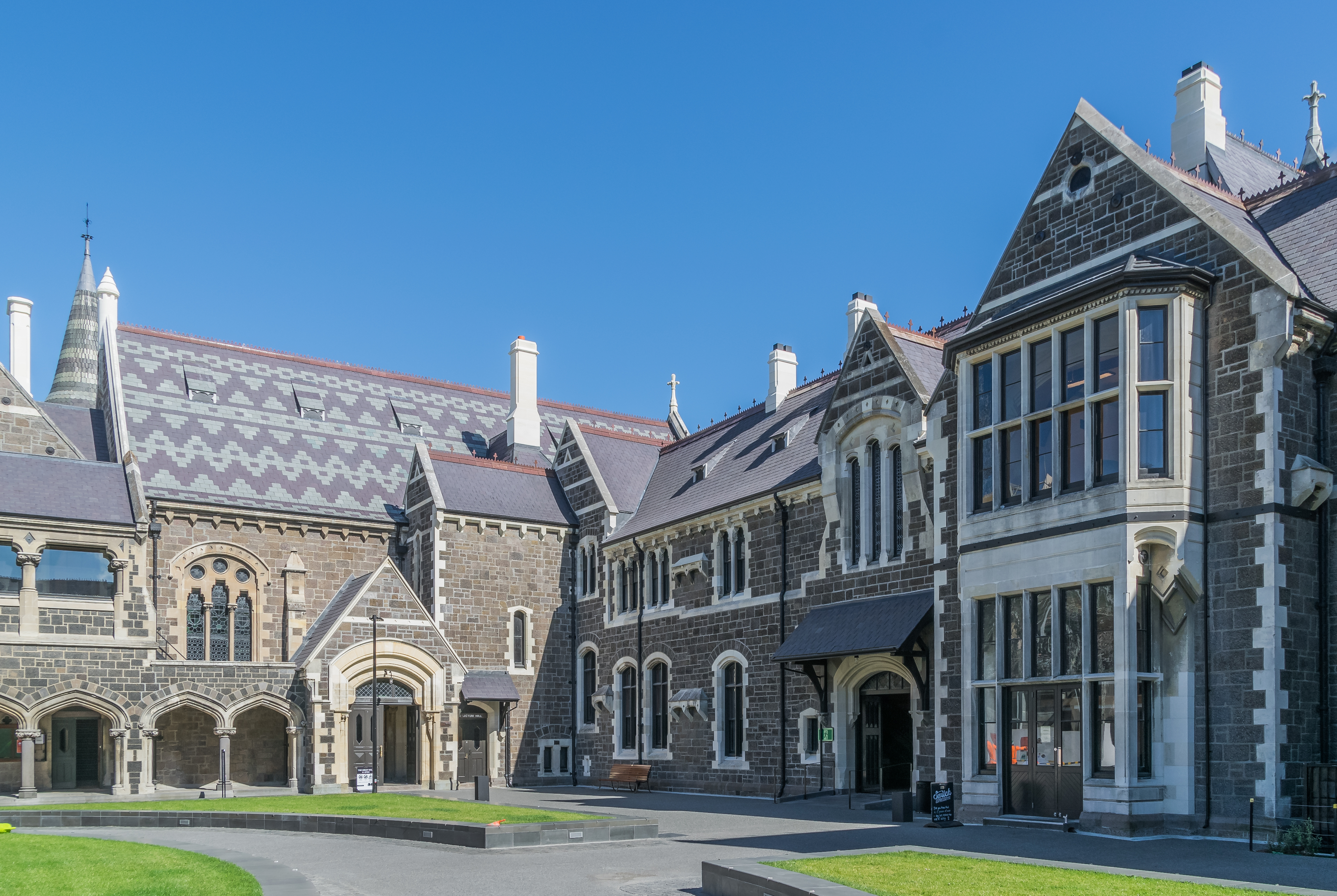
Clock Tower, Great Hall and Classics buildings in the North Quad

The University of Canterbury Teece Museum of Classical Antiquities opened in May 2017, and showcases the James Logie Memorial Collection, a collection of Greek, Roman, Egyptian and Near Eastern artefacts in New Zealand. The Teece Museum is run as a part of the faculty of Arts. The museum is named for University of Canterbury Alumni Professor David Teece and his wife Leigh Teece, who donated a substantial amount of money to the city for earthquake recovery. The money was used by the university to install the classics and music school in the Old Chemistry building at the Christchurch Arts Centre.

The James Logie Memorial Collection was established in 1957 as a result of Miss Marion Steven, a Classics faculty member, donating Greek pottery to Canterbury University College. Steven established the James Logie Memorial Collection to honour her husband, who served as registrar of the college from 1950 until his death in 1956.

The Logie Collection includes a wide range of pottery, beginning with the Bronze Age cultures of Cyprus, Crete and Mycenae it also includes vases that come from Corinth and Athens, the islands in the Aegean, East Greece and the Greek colonies in South Italy and Sicily.

== Organisation and administration ==
=== Governance ===
The university was first governed by a board of governors (1873–1933), then by a college council (1933–1957), and since 1957 by a university council. The council is chaired by a chancellor. The Council includes representatives from the faculties, students and general staff, as well as local industry, employer and trade union representatives.

The original composition of the board of governors was defined in the Canterbury College Ordinance 1873, which was passed by the Canterbury Provincial Council and named 23 members who might serve for life. Initially, the board was given power to fill their own vacancies, and this power transferred to graduates once their number exceeded 30. At the time, there were discussions about the abolition of provincial government (which did happen in 1876), and the governance structure was set up to give board members "prestige, power and permanence", and "provincial authority and its membership and resources were safely perpetuated, beyond the reach of grasping hands in Wellington."

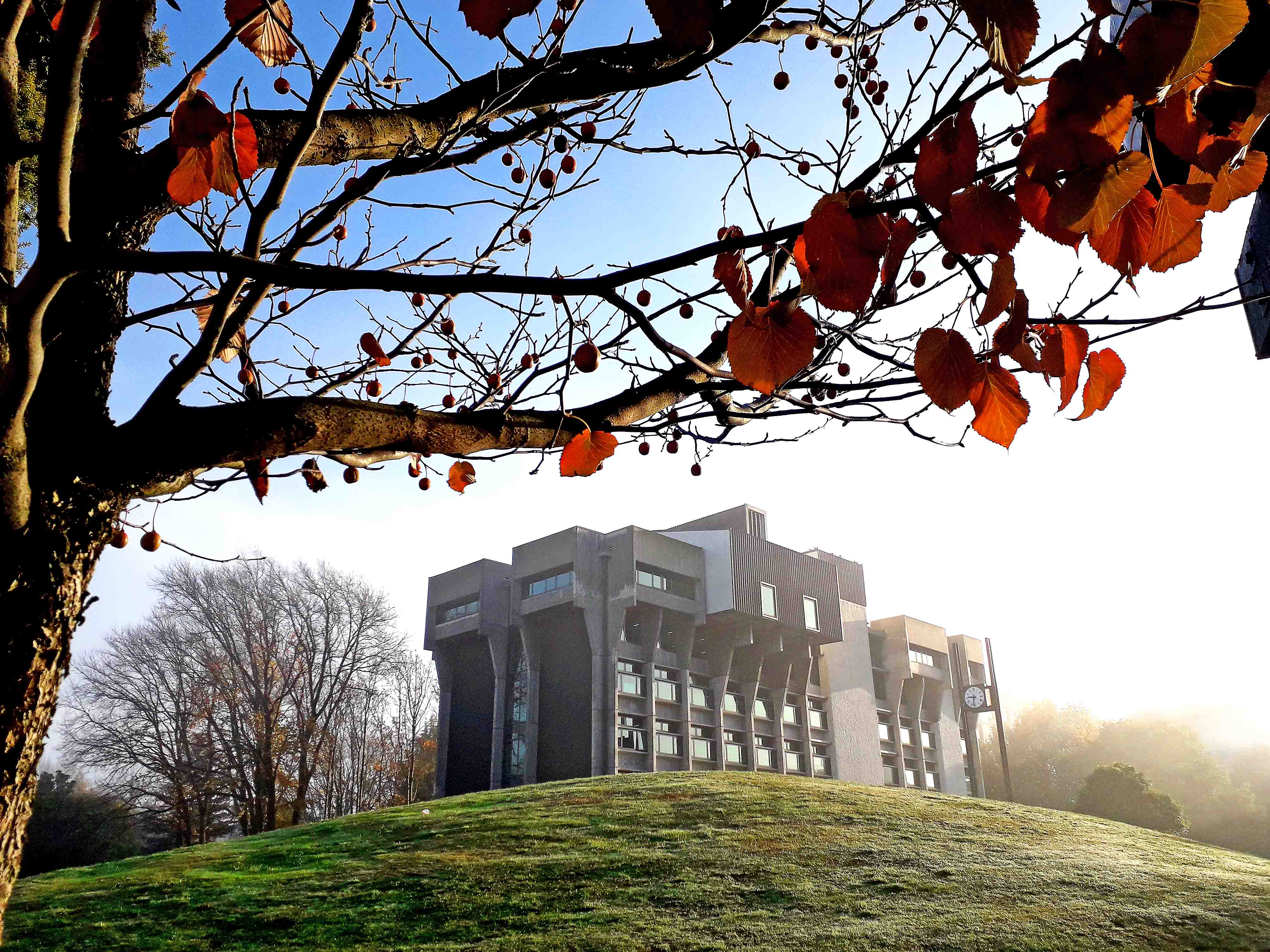
The Matariki Building (Registry Building) serves as home of the University Council which is responsible for the university's governance.

Original members of the Board of Governors were: Charles Bowen, Rev James Buller, William Patten Cowlishaw, John Enys, Charles Fraser, George Gould Sr, Henry Barnes Gresson, William Habens, John Hall, Henry Harper, John Inglis, Walter Kennaway, Arthur C. Knight, Thomas William Maude, William Montgomery, Thomas Potts, William Rolleston, John Studholme, Henry Tancred, James Somerville Turnbull, Henry Richard Webb, Joshua Williams, and Rev William Wellington Willock.

Professor Roy Sharp assumed the position of Vice-Chancellor on 1 March 2003. In May 2008 he announced his imminent resignation from the position, following his acceptance of the chief executive position at the Tertiary Education Commission (TEC) which he took up on 4 August 2008. The then current Deputy Vice-Chancellor, Professor Ian Town, assumed the role of acting Vice-Chancellor on 1 July 2008. On 15 October 2008 the university announced that Rod Carr, a former banker and the CEO of a local software company, would begin a five-year appointment as Vice-Chancellor on 1 February 2009.

Council member and former Pro-Chancellor, Rex Williams, became Chancellor in 2009. Council member John Wood became the new Pro-Chancellor. On 1 January 2012, Wood became Chancellor after Williams retired from the role. In 2019, a new Vice Chancellor, Cheryl de la Rey, was appointed from the University of Pretoria, and Susan McCormack took over as Chancellor.

As of 2026 the University of Canterbury is divided into seven faculties, which encompass all major departments of both research and teaching.

Faculty	Established
Arts | Toi Tangata	1882
Engineering | Pūhanga	1887
Science | Te Kaupeka Pūtaiao	1886
Law | Te Kaupeka Ture	1873
Business | Te Kura Umanga	1921
Education | Te Kaupeka Ako	2007
Health | Oranga	2022

Chair of the University of Canterbury Council
	Name	Portrait	Term
Chair of the Canterbury College Board of Governors
1	Joshua Williams		1873–1875
2	Henry Barnes Gresson		1875
3	William Montgomery		1875–1885
4	Frederick de Carteret Malet		1885–1894
5	Henry Richard Webb		1894–1901
6	Thomas S. Weston		1901–1902
7	Arthur Rhodes		1902–1904
8	Charles Lewis		1904–1907
9	George Russell		1907–1910
10	Jonathan Charles Adams		1910–1918
11	Henry Acland		1918–1928
12	George John Smith		1928–1932
13	Christopher Thomas Aschman		1932–1933
Chair of the Canterbury University College Council
1	Christopher Thomas Aschman		1933–1938
2	Arthur Edward Flower		1938–1944
3	John Henry Erle Schroder		1944–1946
4	Walter Cuthbert Colee		1946–1948
5	Joseph Ward		1948–1951
6	William John Cartwright		1951–1954
7	Donald William Bain		1954–1957
Chancellor of the University of Canterbury
1	Donald William Bain		1957–1959
2	Carleton Hunter Perkins		1959–1965
3	Alwyn Warren		1965–1968
4	Terry McCombs		1968–1971
5	John Matson		1972–1976
6	Brian Anderson		1977–1979
7	Jean Herbison		1979–1984
8	Charles Caldwell		1984–1986
9	Richard Bowron		1987–1991
10	Ian Leggat		1992–1997
11	Phyllis Guthardt		1998–2002
12	Robin Mann		2003–2008
13	Rex Williams		2009–2012
14	John Wood		2012–2018
15	Susan McCormack		2019–2022
16	Amy Adams		2022–present

=== Coat of arms ===
Coat of arms of the University of Canterbury
Notes With the dissolution of the University of New Zealand, the newly independent University of Canterbury devised its own coat of arms, blazoned Escutcheon Murrey a fleece argent, in base a plough or, and on a chief wavy or an open book proper bound murrey, edged and clasped or between a pall azure charged with four crosses formy fitchy or and a cross flory azure.

The fleece symbolises the pastoral, and the plough at the base the agricultural background of the province of Canterbury. The bishop's pall and the cross flory represent Canterbury's ecclesiastical connections, and the open book denotes scholarship. As an institution of learning, the university's coat of arms does not have a helmet, crest or mantling. The university's unofficial coat of arms was accompanied by the Latin motto:

Ergo tua rura manebunt (therefore the lands shall remain yours).

— Roman Poet Virgil, Eclogue I, line 46

Because of the land holdings with which the Provincial Government endowed the early University, this was appropriate. When the coat of arms was redesigned, the motto was removed and now the motto is only used unofficially.

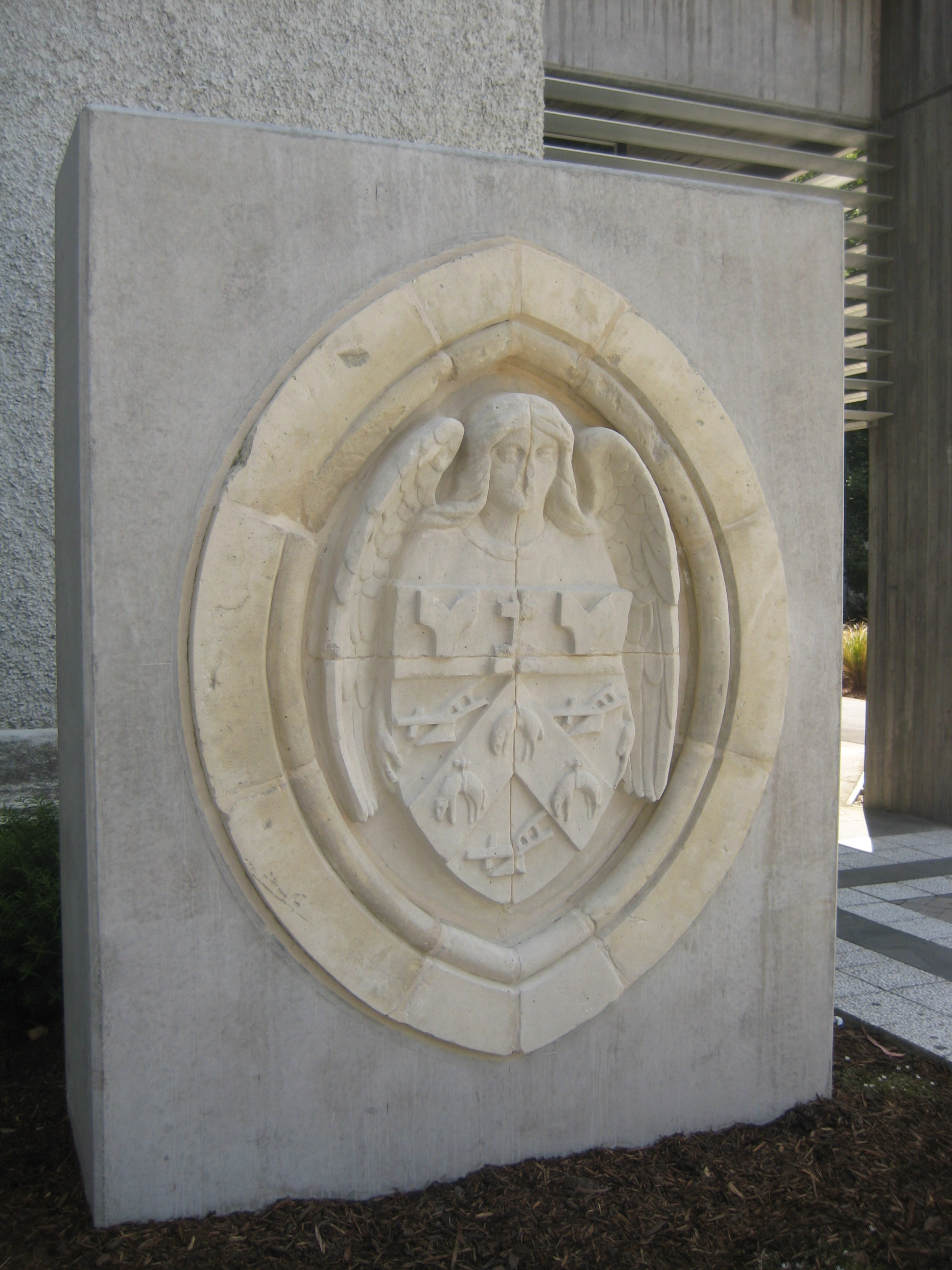
An Oamaru stone carving of the university coat of arms can be viewed at the eastern entrance of the Matariki Building (Registry Building).

== Academic profile ==
The University of Canterbury offers 147 undergraduate majors and 61 graduate degrees. For the 2020 academic year, the university granted 2,257 bachelor's degrees, 1,003 graduate degrees, and 384 honours degrees. To graduate with a full-time undergraduate degree in the usual three years, undergraduates normally take four courses per semester. In most majors, an honours degree requires advanced coursework and a thesis – this usually takes an extra year. However, some undergraduate degrees that are also professional degrees, such as the Bachelor of Laws (LLB), Bachelor of Engineering (BEng) and Bachelor of Forestry Science (BForSc), typically take four years.

=== Size and composition ===
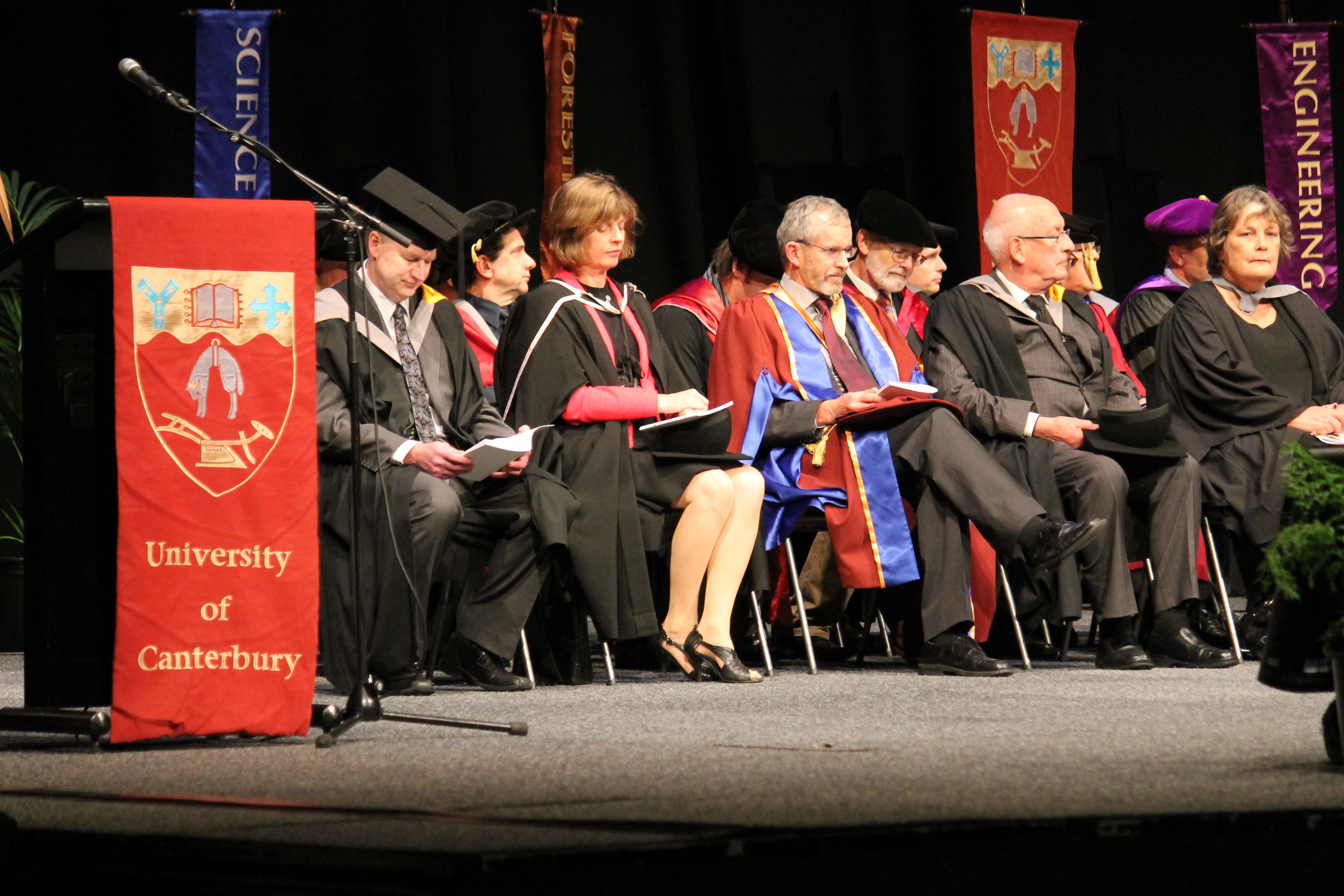
University of Canterbury graduation ceremony held at Christchurch Town Hall.

According to the UC Annual Report, at 31 December 2024 the university has a total of 26,433 students (18,319 equivalent full-time students), up 9% on the previous year. 2,587 are Maori students. UC has a total of 2,484 staff members.

Following the earthquakes, the number of students enrolled at UC fell from 18,783 during 2010 to 14,725 during 2014, though the number of new enrolments increased in 2014. In 2016 enrolled student numbers rose to 15,564. Enrolment as of 2020 has reached pre-earthquake levels with a 18,364 students enrolled at UC.

=== Academic reputation ===
University rankings

Global – Overall
- ARWU World: 401–500 (2025)
- CWTS World: 927 (Note: The CWTS Leiden Ranking is based on P (top 10%).) (2024)
- QS World: 261 (2026)
- QS Employability: 301–500 (2022)
- THE World: 601–800 (2026)
- USNWR Global: =542 (25/26)

National – Overall
- ARWU National: 2–4 (2025)
- CWTS National: 4 (2024)
- QS National: 5 (2026)
- THE National: 8 (2026)
- USNWR National: 4 (25/26)

In the 2024 Aggregate Ranking of Top Universities, which measures aggregate performance across the QS, THE and ARWU rankings, the university attained a position of #360 (4th nationally).

In the 2026 Quacquarelli Symonds World University Rankings (published 2025), the university attained a position of #261 (5th nationally).

In the Times Higher Education World University Rankings 2026 (published 2025), the university attained a position of #601–800 (8th nationally).

In the 2025 Academic Ranking of World Universities, the university attained a position of #401–500 (tied 2–4th nationally).

In the 2025–2026 U.S. News & World Report Best Global Universities, the university attained a tied position of #542 (4th nationally).

In the CWTS Leiden Ranking 2024, the university attained a position of #927 (4th nationally).

== Student life ==
=== Students' association ===
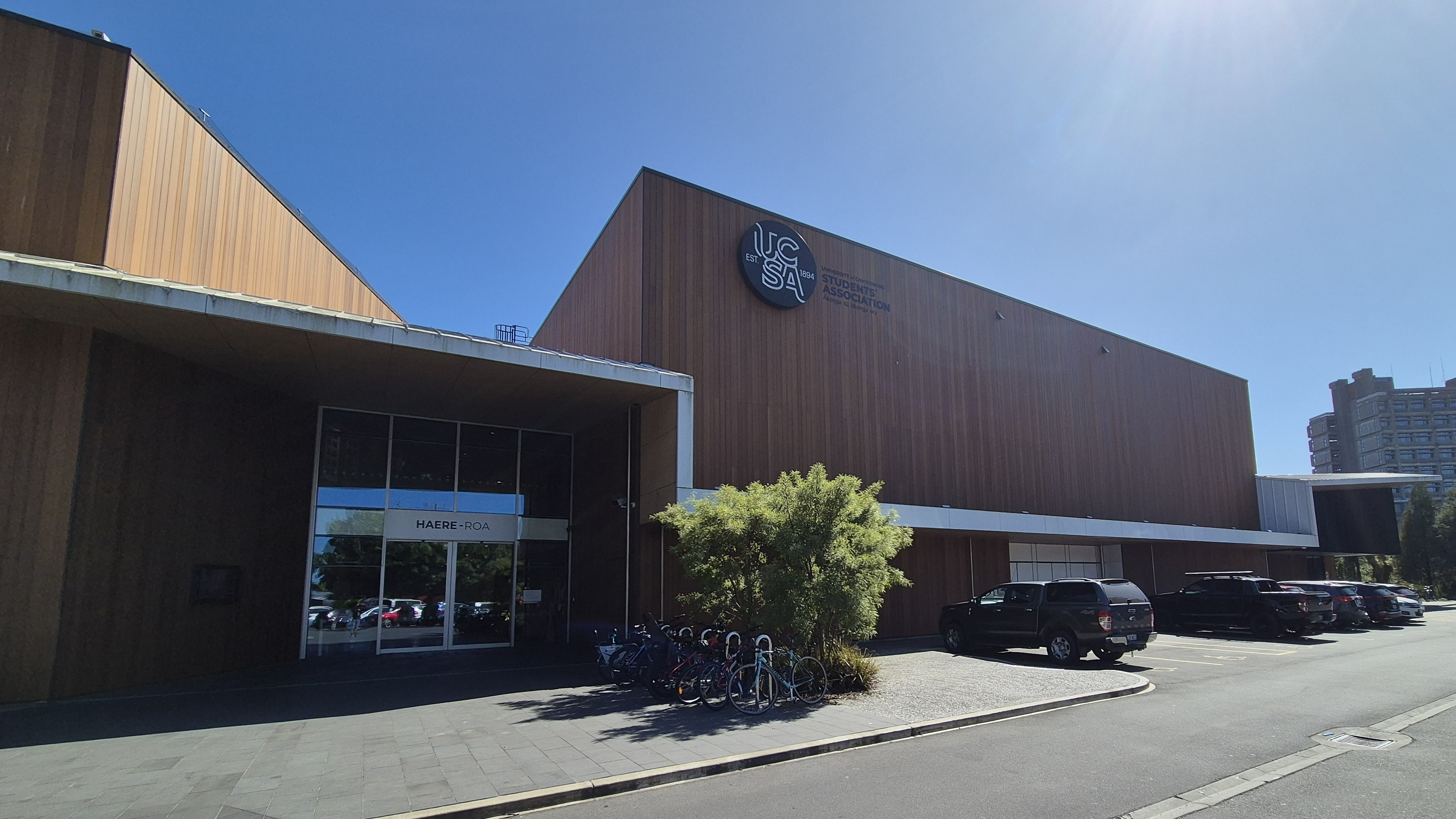

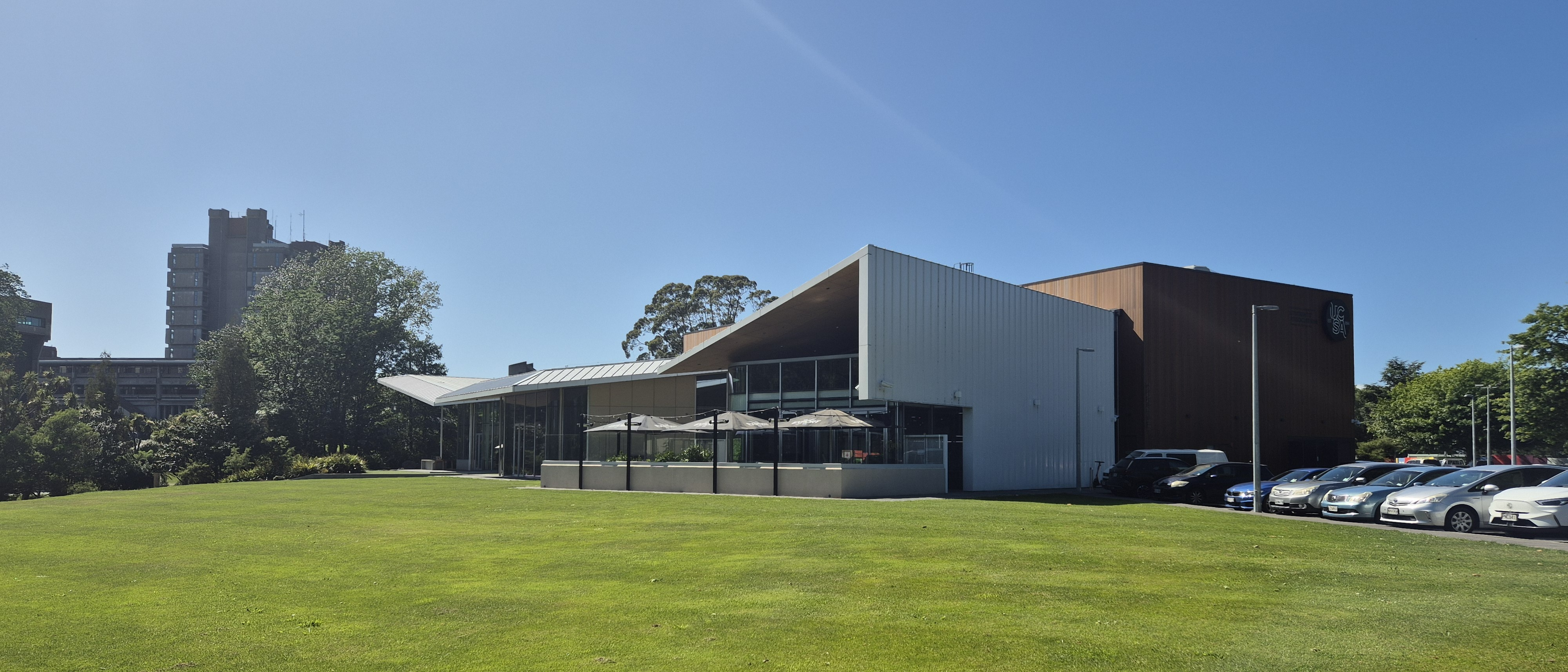
Haere-roa (the UCSA building)

There are two main student organisations within the University of Canterbury, University of Canterbury Students' Association (UCSA) and Te Akatoki Māori Students' Association. The UCSA is based in Haere-roa, the university’s student union building and main hub for student activity on the Ilam Campus. The original UCSA Building was damaged in the 2010 and 2011 earthquakes and was subsequently torn down, it was rebuilt and completed in 2019. Haere-roa is home to the student bar, The Foundry, and the Ngaio Marsh Theatre, named for the former alumnus of the same name. Haere-roa hosts a number of student societies and organisation offices. The USCA also runs several cafes and restaurants around campus.

The university's student population operates the main student magazine, Canta, which was established in 1930. There are 12 issues per year, which are distributed around the UC campus every second Monday during the academic year. The newspaper's offices are in Haere-roa.

Canterbury's student population also runs a radio station which began to broadcast and operate as RDU in 1976; it began FM frequency broadcasting in 1986. RDU acquired its present frequency of 98.5 in 2003.

Student body composition
Race and ethnicity (as at 10 March 2024)
NZ European/Pākehā & Other European	63%
Asian	17%
Māori	10%
Other (Note: Other consists of ethnicities not displayed & those who did not state their ethnicity.)	5%
Pacific Peoples	3%
Middle East, Latin America & African	2%
Economic diversity (as at 31 December 2023)
Student Allowance (Note: The percentage of students who received a student allowance intended for low-income students (eligible for students with parental joint earnings below NZ$124,474.45).)	15%
Student Loan (Note: The percentage of students who received student loan (eligible for all full-time students).)	43%

=== Clubs ===
The university has over 140 academic, sporting, recreational and cultural societies and clubs. The most prominent of these include the Student Volunteer Army, the University of Canterbury Engineering Society (ENSOC), the University of Canterbury Law Society (LAWSOC), the University of Canterbury Commerce Society (UCOM) as well as the largest non-faculty clubs such as PongSoc (University of Canterbury Pong Society), Motosoc (Motorsports Society), Lads without Labels, CUBA (Canterbury University Boardriders' Association), CUTC (Tramping Club), UC Global Society (UCGS), UC Bike, Opsoc, The Gentlemen's Club. CUSSC (Canterbury University Snow Sports Club, formerly the CU Ski Club prior to 1997) is the only university club in New Zealand to own a ski field lodge, located at Temple Basin Ski Field. The club runs many events to raise funds for maintenance of their lodge. The University of Canterbury Drama Society (Dramasoc) achieved fame for its 1942–1969 Shakespeare productions under Dame Ngaio Marsh, but regularly performs as an active student- and alumni-run arts fixture in the small Christchurch theatre-scene.

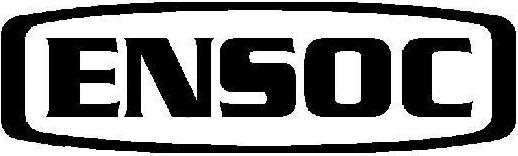
Engineering Society (ENSOC) Logo.

In 2011 the SVA was established in the aftermath of the Christchurch earthquakes. A student at the University of Canterbury, Sam Johnson, rallied fellow students to help support the clean-up from the devastation. The club has grown and today is the largest club at the University of Canterbury. In 2020, in response to the COVID-19 pandemic, the SVA supported the vulnerable with their shopping during the lockdown.

Lads without Labels is a not-for-profit charity dedicated to improving men's mental health in and around campus. On 5–8 October 2021 Lads without labels started the Project 72 fundraiser, a 72-hour relay on the University of Canterbury campus, which raised $12,000 for men's mental health; as well in 2021 Lads without labels organised a 24-hour backyard cricket marathon raising $45,000.

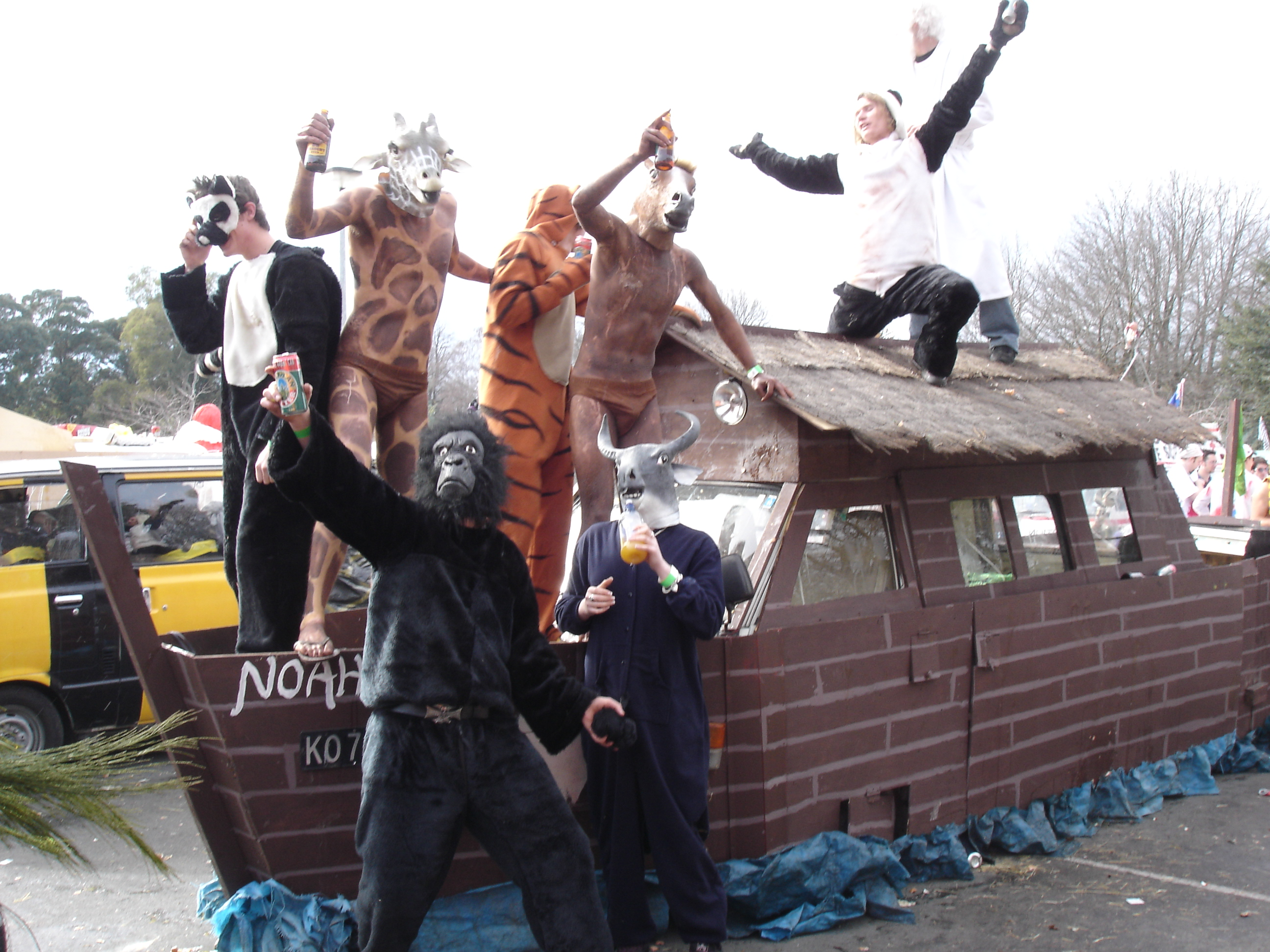
An Undie 500 car decorated as Noah's Ark

One major student tradition, the Undie 500, involved an annual car-rally from Christchurch to Dunedin run by ENSOC. The rules required only the use of a road-legal car costing under $500 with a sober driver. The 2007 event gained international news coverage (including on CNN and BBC World) when it ended in rioting in the student quarter of Dunedin and in North East Valley. ENSOC cancelled the planned 2008 event. The Undie 500 was replaced by the Roundie 500 in 2011. This event has the same principles but follows a route through rural Canterbury, returning to Christchurch the same day.

== Notable people ==
=== Alumni ===
Since it was founded, University of Canterbury alumni have made significant and creative contributions to society, the arts and sciences, business, national New Zealand, and international affairs.

==== Politics ====
New Zealand Prime Ministers that attended Canterbury

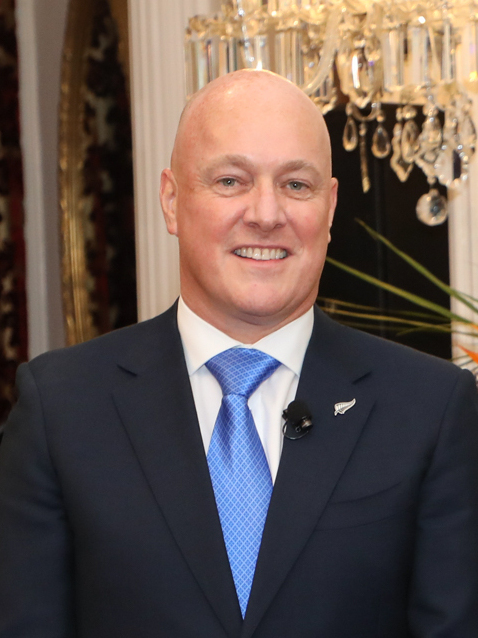
Christopher Luxon

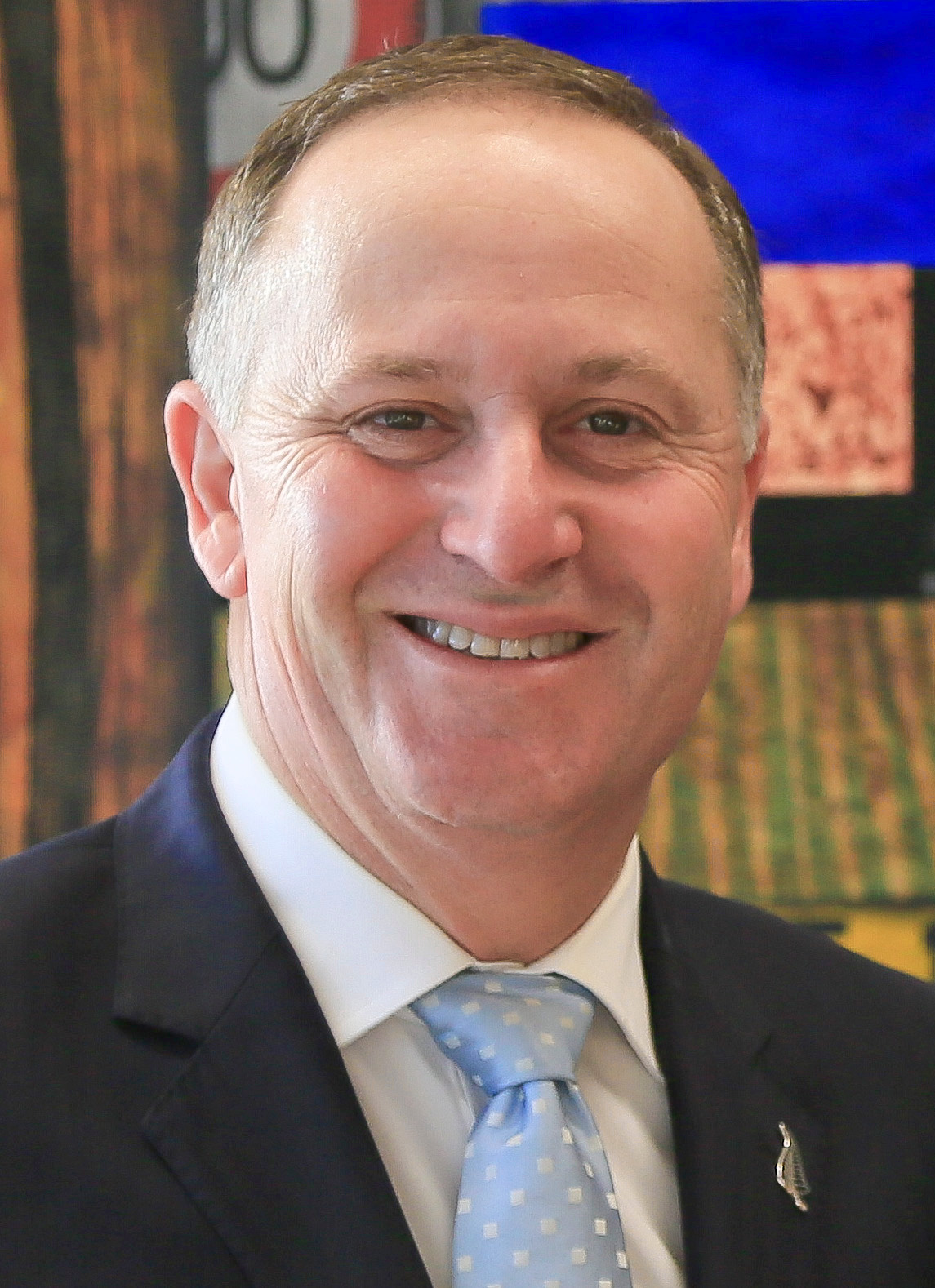
John Key

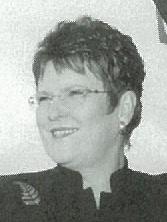
Jenny Shipley

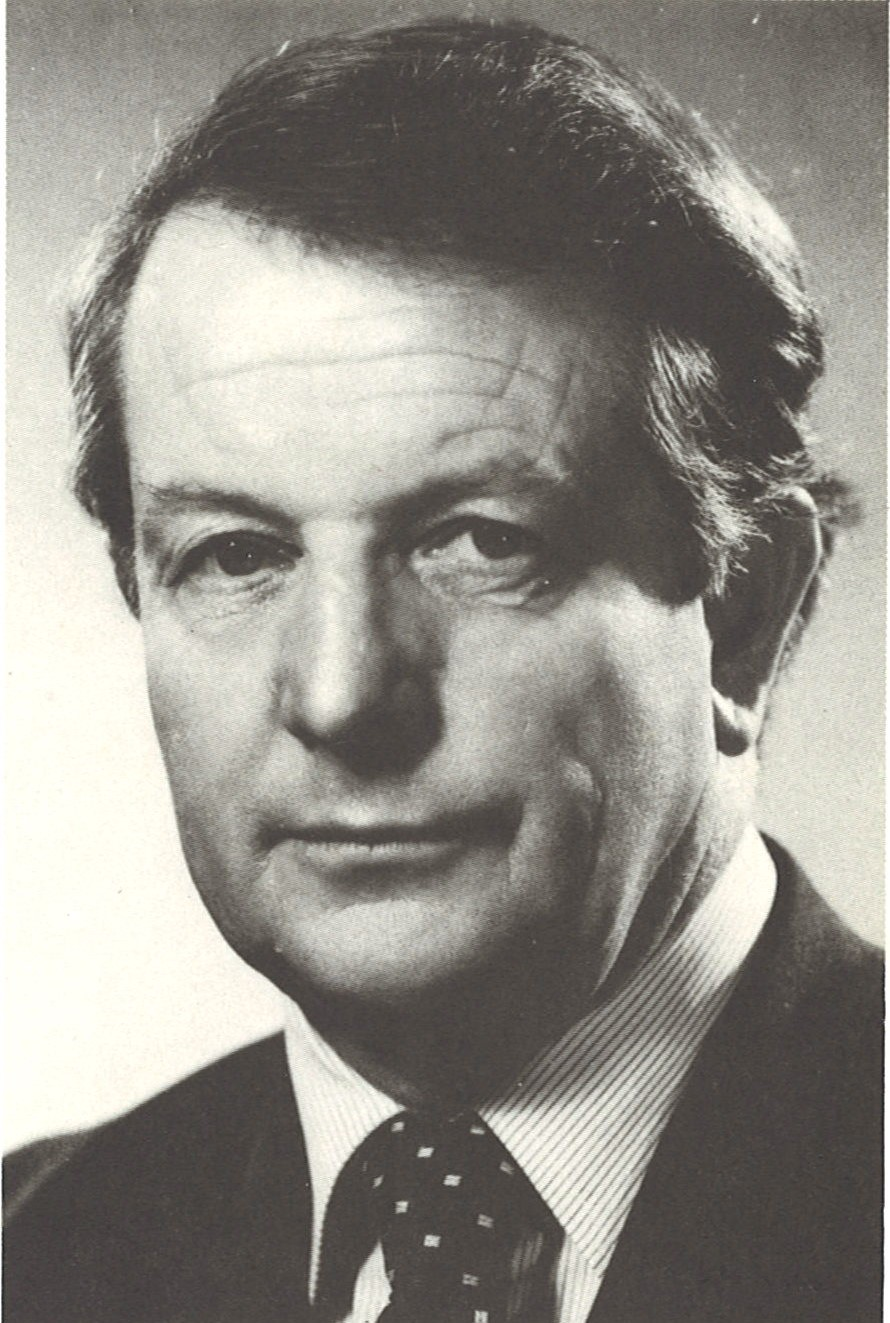
Bill Rowling

Four New Zealand Prime Ministers have attended Canterbury, including Christopher Luxon, John Key, Bill Rowling, and Jenny Shipley, the latter attended Christchurch Teachers College, now merged with the university. International leaders educated at Canterbury include Feleti Sevele Prime Minister of Tonga, Feleti Teo Prime Minister of Tuvalu and Anote Tong President of Kiribati.

Politicians who attended Canterbury

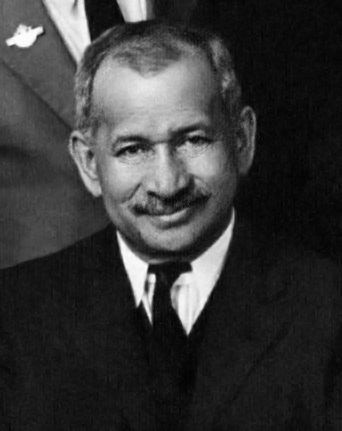
Āpirana Ngata

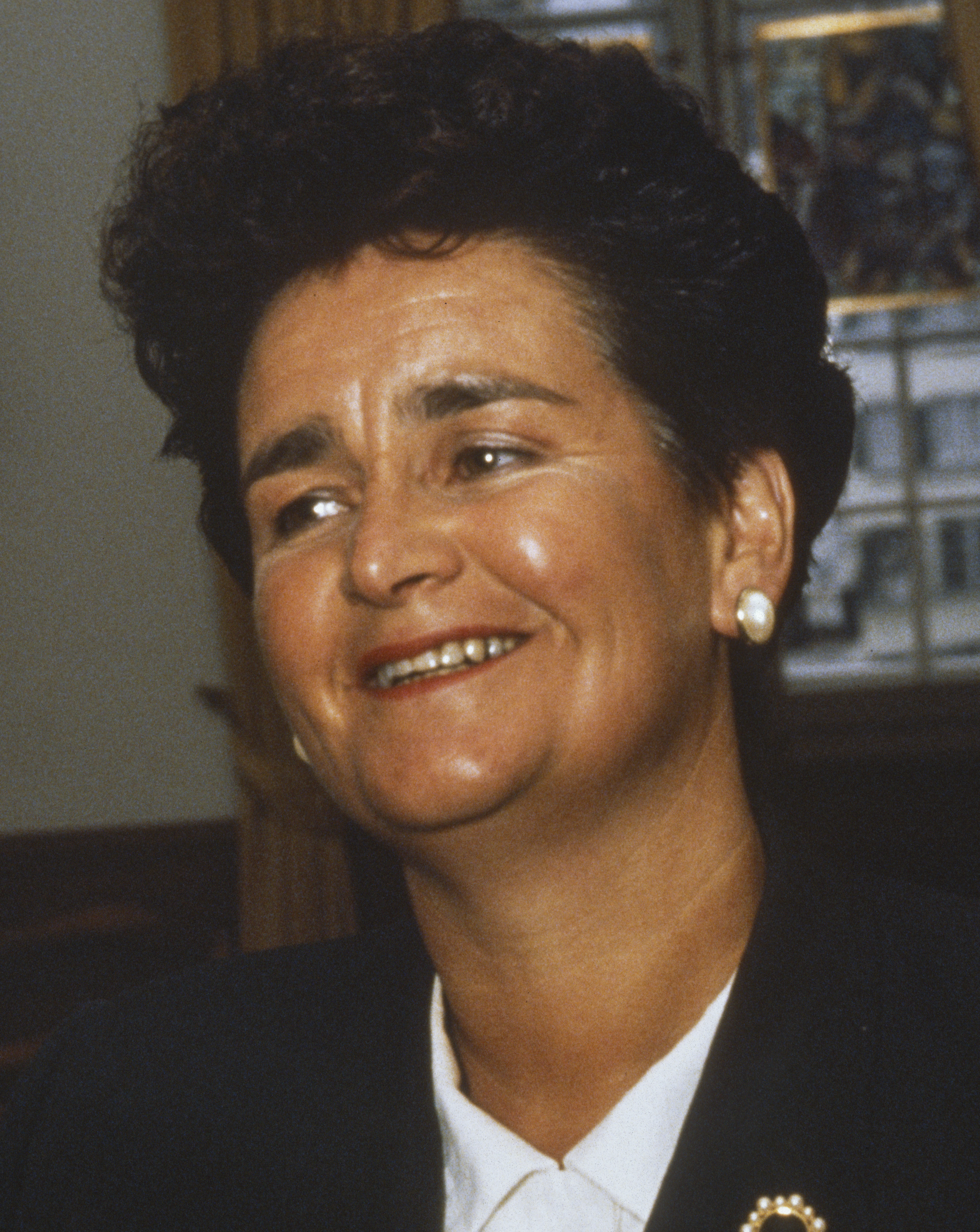
Ruth Richardson

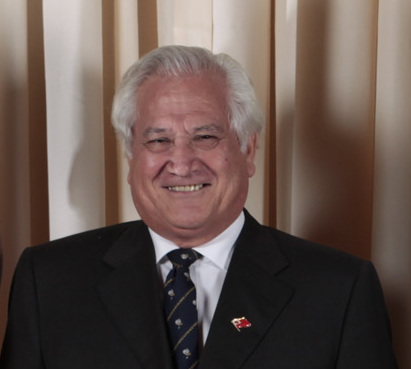
Feleti Sevele

Notable politicians who studied at Canterbury include: Ruth Richardson Minister of Finance for the "mother of all budgets" which formed the catalyst of her economic reforms known in the media as "Ruthanasia". Nicola Willis, the current Minister for Finance, also attended Canterbury, as did other former Ministers of Finance Michael Cullen and David Caygill. Former Leaders of the Opposition Judith Collins (though she did not complete her degree) and Don Brash, the latter whom is infamous for his Orewa Speech. Other significant figures include Nick Smith, Rodney Hide, Stuart Nash, Peter Dunne, Marian Hobbs, and Catherine Isaac. Mayors of Christchurch include: Lianne Dalziel, Bob Parker, Vicki Buck and George Manning.

It also includes Āpirana Ngata the first Māori to receive a degree, and described as the foremost Māori politician. He was known for his work in promoting and protecting Māori culture and language. He also features on the New Zealand fifty-dollar note.

==== Law ====
Judges who attended Canterbury

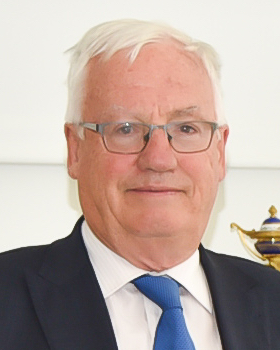
William Young

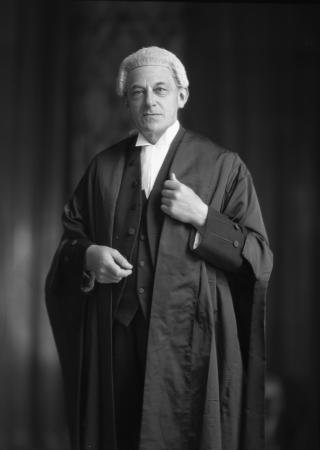
Michael Myers

Canterbury has produced a large number of distinguished jurists, judges and lawyers around the world. Among its alumni are Supreme Court Justices Andrew Tipping, New Zealand's longest-serving judge, who spent 25 years on the bench, and William Young, also former President of the Court of Appeal. Ivor Richardson, also a former President of the Court of Appeal, is credited with significantly influencing the development of New Zealand tax law and policy.

Furthermore, Canterbury has educated six current High Court Judges, including former Chief High Court Judge Geoffrey Venning. Other notable Lawyers include: Matthew Palmer Justice of the Court of Appeal (though he only completed his B.A. at Canterbury); Graham Panckhurst Justice of the High Court and chair of the Royal Commission into the Pike River Mine disaster; and Michael Myers sixth Chief Justice of New Zealand. The New Zealand Government's Attorneys General have included: Judith Collins and Michael Cullen.

==== Mathematics, sciences and economics ====
Mathematicians, scientists and economists who attended Canterbury

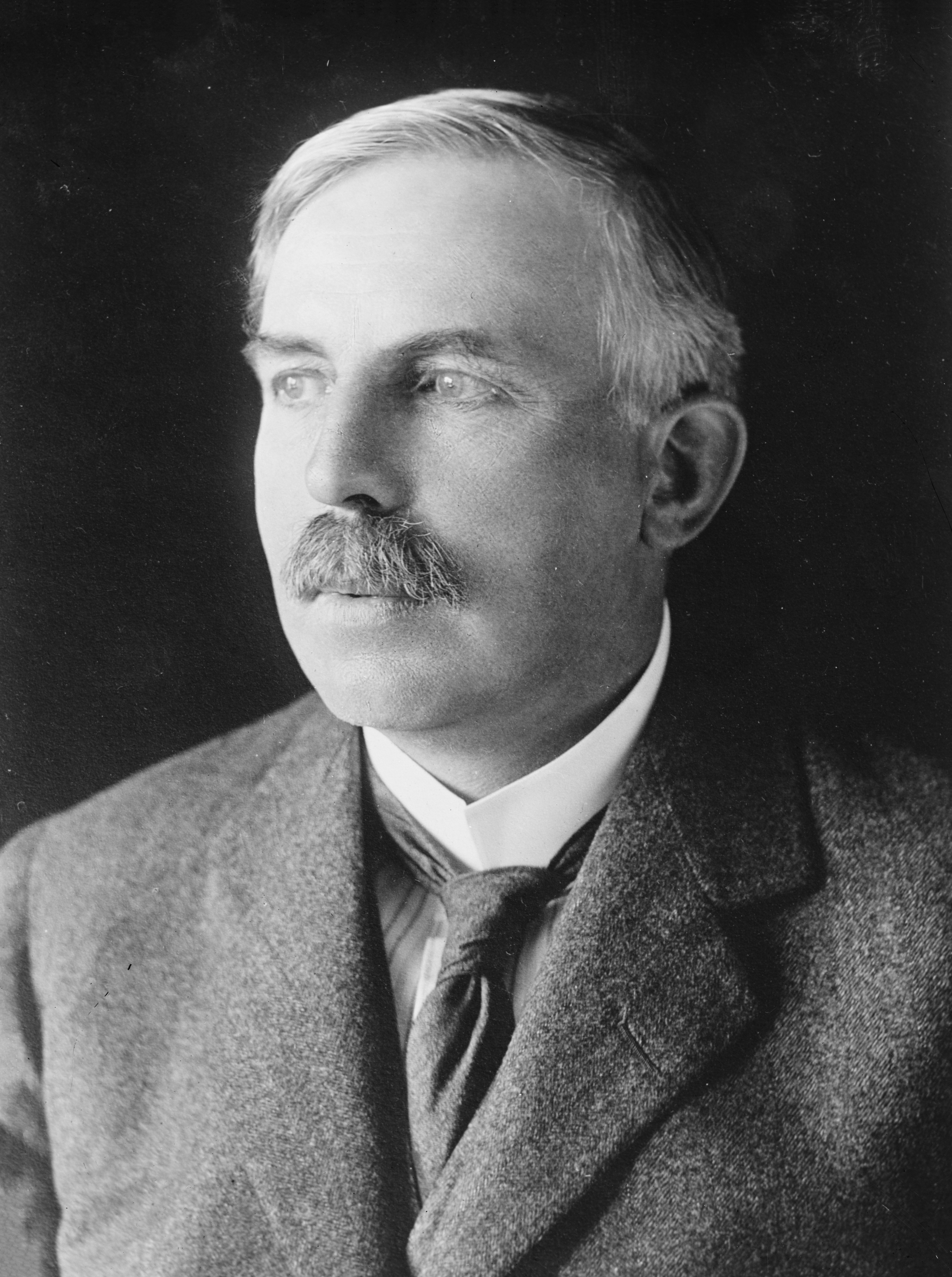
Ernest Rutherford

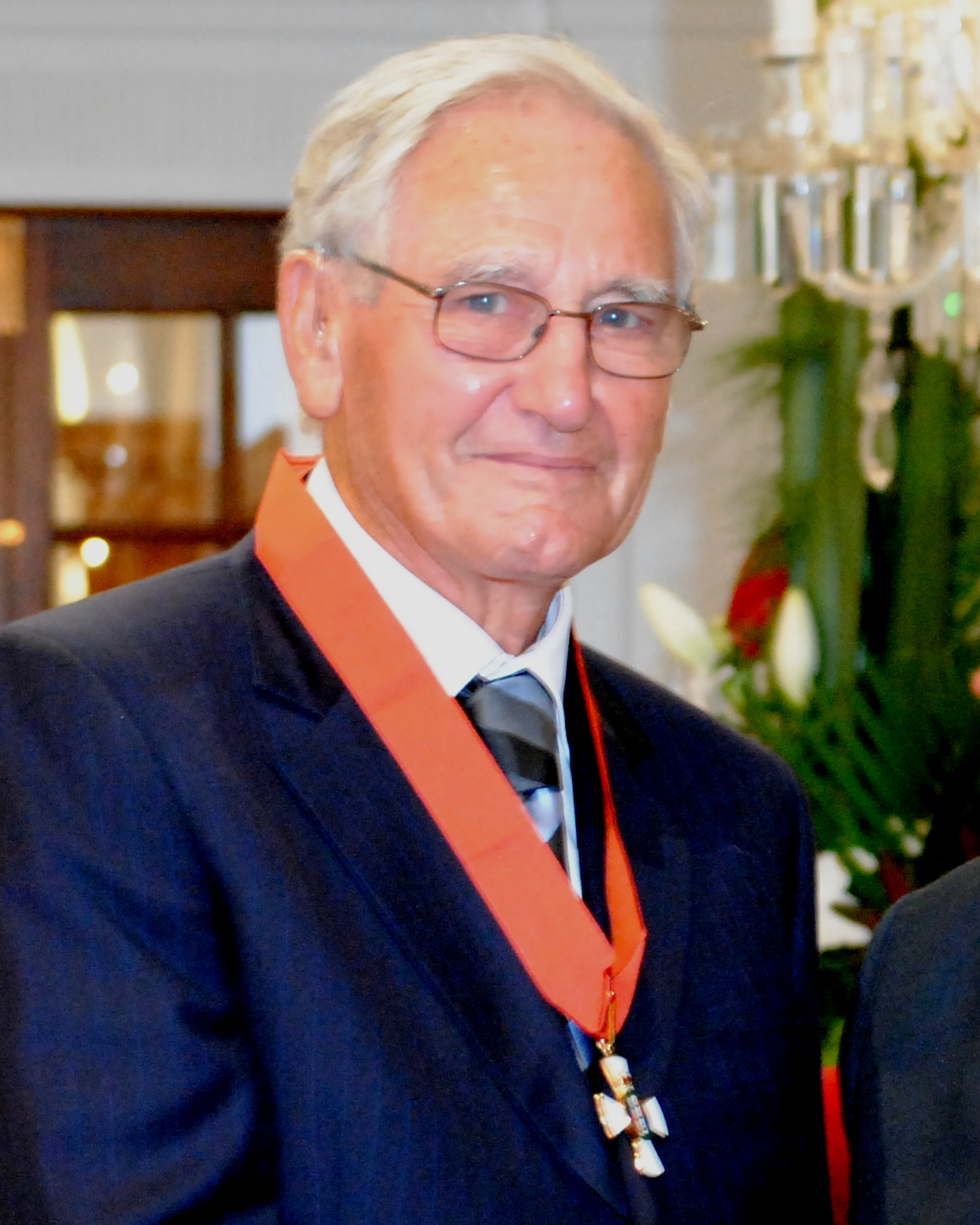
Roy Kerr

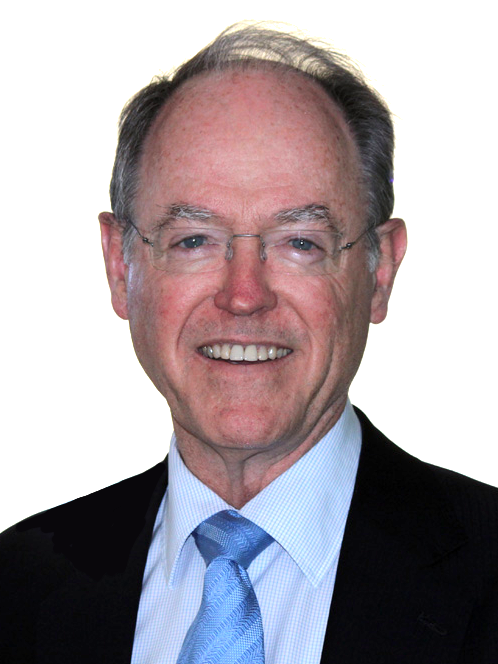
Don Brash

One of the most notable Canterbury alumni is Ernest Rutherford a physicist described as "the father of nuclear physics", and who features on the New Zealand one hundred-dollar note. In 1908 he was awarded the Nobel Prize in Chemistry "for his investigations into the disintegration of the elements, and the chemistry of radioactive substances". In 1917 Rutherford "split the atom". Roy Kerr, was also educated at Canterbury, he discovered the Kerr Solution, an exact solution to the Einstein field equation of general relativity. Beatrice Tinsley an astronomer and cosmologist who through her research in the United States in the 1960s and 1970s, proved that the universe was infinite and would expand forever. Richard Barrer was a 'founding father' of zeolite science and its applications he gave his name to the zeolite Barrerite, and the barrer, a unit of gas permeability. Other notable scientists include: Ian Axford, Toby Hendy, Ian Foster, Craig Nevill-Manning and Michelle Rogan-Finnemore.

Notable engineers include: John Britten, a mechanical engineer, who designed the Britten motorcycle that won races and set numerous speed records on international circuits; and Bill Pickering, an aerospace engineer, who headed Pasadena, California's Jet Propulsion Laboratory for 22 years. Other notable engineers include Nigel Priestley, Thomas Paulay and David Beauchamp.

Economists Rex Bergstrom, Brian Easton, Ken Henry, Graham Scott and John McMillan attended Canterbury. Don Brash, who received a B.A. and M.A. in economics, also served as Governor of the Reserve Bank. He presided over the reforms of central-bank autonomy and accountability under the Public Finance Act 1989 which were described as "genuine innovations".

- Rita Angus – painter
- Ian Axford – space scientist
- Michael Baigent – author and archaeologist
- Rosemary Banks – ambassador to the United Nations
- David Beauchamp – civil engineer
- Rex Bergstrom – academic and economist
- Don Brash – former Governor of the Reserve Bank of New Zealand and former leader of the opposition
- Althea Carbon – lawyer and co-founder of Charity-IT
- Eleanor Catton – writer and Man Booker Prize winner 2013
- Neil Cherry – environmental scientist
- Mark Chignell – academic
- Nathan Cohen – world champion and Olympic champion rower
- Judith Collins – politician and former leader of the National Party
- Michael P. Collins – academic
- Helen Connon – educational pioneer
- Michael Cullen – former deputy prime minister and minister of finance
- Lianne Dalziel – 46th mayor of Christchurch
- Rhys Darby – comedian
- G. F. J. Dart – headmaster of Ballarat Grammar School 1942–1970
- Peter Dunne – politician
- Brian Easton – economist
- Atta Elayyan – futsal player, murdered in the Christchurch mosque shootings
- Stevan Eldred-Grigg – historian and novelist
- Ian Foster – computer scientist
- Rob Fyfe – businessman and former Air New Zealand CEO
- Roy Good – artist and designer
- Edith Searle Grossmann – writer and journalist
- Henry Hargreaves – photographer
- Rhona Haszard – artist
- Joel Hayward – academic
- Toby Hendy – science communicator
- Ken Henry – Secretary to the Treasury (Australia)
- Rodney Hide – politician
- Jock Hobbs – former captain of the All Blacks
- Marian Hobbs – politician
- Nina Oberg Humphries – artist
- Catherine Isaac – politician
- Bruce Jesson – writer
- Jess Johnson – artist
- Roger Kerr – executive director of the New Zealand Business Roundtable
- Roy Kerr – mathematician and physicist, discovered the Kerr geometry
- John Key – 38th prime minister of New Zealand
- Howard Kippenberger – military leader
- Jordan Luck – musician
- Christopher Luxon – 42nd prime minister of New Zealand and former CEO of Air New Zealand
- Euan Macleod – painter
- Margaret Mahy – author of children's and young adult books
- Ngaio Marsh – crime writer and theatre director
- Lucas Martin, race walker
- Julie Maxton – academic administrator
- John McMillan – economist
- Colleen Mills – communications professor
- Trevor Moffitt – painter
- Stuart Nash – politician
- Sam Neill – actor
- Craig Nevill-Manning – engineer
- Sir Āpirana Ngata – lawyer and statesman; first Māori person to complete a degree at a New Zealand university
- William Orange – Anglican churchman and founder of Latimer House
- Matthew Palmer – Justice of the Court of Appeal of New Zealand
- Graham Panckhurst – Justice of the High Court of New Zealand
- Thomas Paulay – earthquake engineer
- Bill Pickering – engineering administrator
- J. G. A. Pocock – historian
- Nigel Priestley – earthquake engineer
- Ivor Richardson – president of the Court of Appeal of New Zealand
- Ruth Richardson – lawyer and former minister of finance
- Michelle Rogan-Finnemore — geologist, legal expert, Antarctic program manager
- Bill Rowling – 30th prime minister of New Zealand
- Theia – musician
- Ernest Rutherford – physicist and Nobel laureate in chemistry
- Graham Cecil Scott – economist, government official, international consultant
- Walter Lawrence Scott – British colonial officer
- Feleti Vakaʻuta Sevele – 14th prime minister of Tonga
- Jenny Shipley – 36th prime minister of New Zealand
- Nick Smith – politician
- Kevin Smith – actor
- John Storey – rower
- Mahiriki Tangaroa – painter
- Margaret Thomson – film director
- Beatrice Tinsley – astronomer
- Sir Andrew Tipping – former Justice of the Supreme Court of New Zealand
- Anote Tong – 4th president of Kiribati
- Vincent Ward – film director and screenwriter
- Ada Wells – feminist
- Murray C. Wells – professor of accounting at the University of Sydney
- Dora Wilcox – poet
- Nicola Willis – finance minister
- Cal Wilson – comedian and television personality
- Glenn Wilson – psychologist
- John Young – professor of composition, De Montfort University, Leicester
- William Young – Justice of the Supreme Court of New Zealand

=== Faculty ===
- Jacob Bercovitch – international relations, conflict mediation
- Alexander Bickerton – chemist
- Anne-Marie Brady – political scientist
- Alice Candy – historian
- Denis Dutton – philosopher
- Jan Evans-Freeman – electrical engineer
- Juliet Gerrard – biochemist
- Clive Granger – Nobel Memorial Prize in Economic Sciences, Erskine Fellow
- Robert Grubbs – Nobel Memorial Prize in Chemistry, Erskine Fellow
- Jennifer Hay – linguist
- Elizabeth Herriott – botanist and first woman appointed lecturer
- William Keith Jackson – professor emeritus, NZ parliamentary politics
- Susan Krumdieck – energy transition engineering
- Megan McAuliffe – specialist in speech production/impairment
- Sacha McMeeking – law, Māori and indigenous studies
- Henrietta Mondry – specialist in Russian culture
- James Ockey – political scientist and specialist on Thailand and Southeast Asia
- Karl Popper – philosopher
- Arthur Prior – philosopher
- Alexander Tan – political scientist and specialist in political economy, party politics, Taiwan and Asian politics
- Stephen Todd – Professor of Law, principal author of The Law of Torts in New Zealand; and co-author of The Law of Contract in New Zealand
- Duncan Webb – politician and lawyer

=== Honorary doctors ===
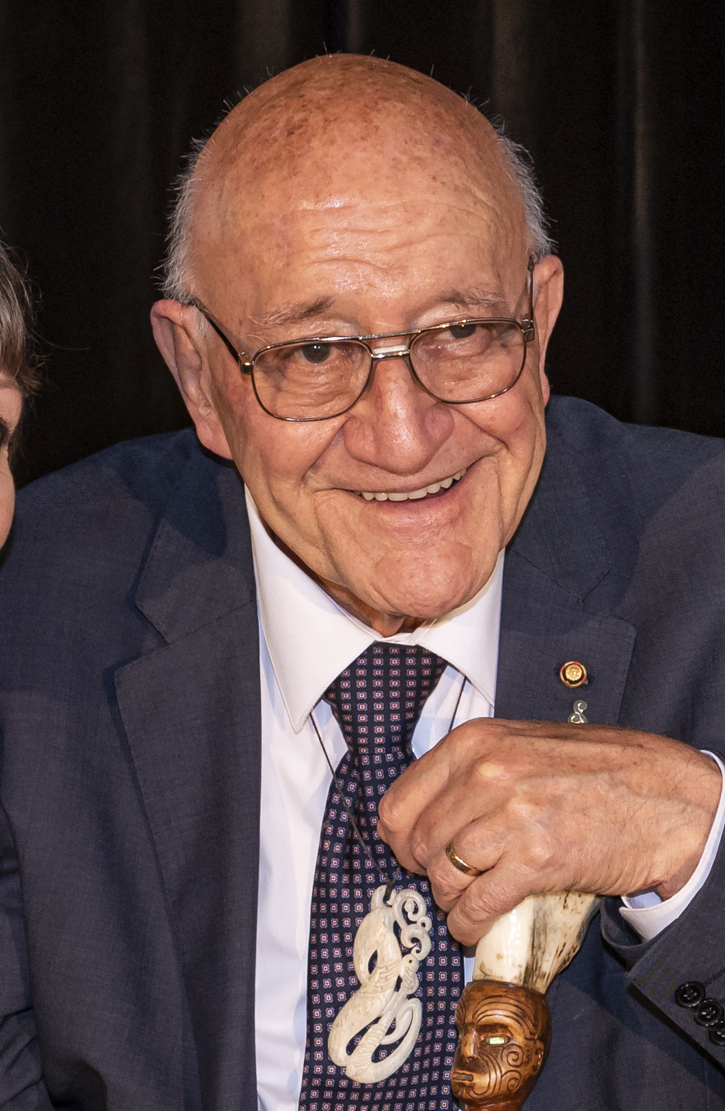
Tā Tipene O'Regan, Teacher, academic, Chief Negotiator for Te Kerēme (LittD hc, 1992)

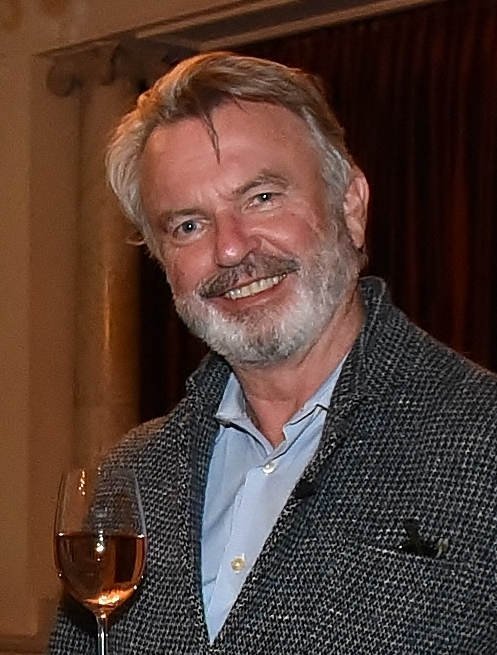
Sam Neill, Actor (LittD hc, 2002)

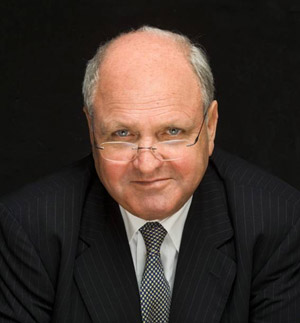
Mike Moore, 34th Prime Minister of New Zealand (DCom hc, 2005)

Since 1962, the University of Canterbury has been awarding honorary doctorates. In many years, no awards were made, but in most years, multiple doctorates were awarded. The highest number of honorary doctorates was awarded in 1973, when there were seven recipients.

== In popular culture ==
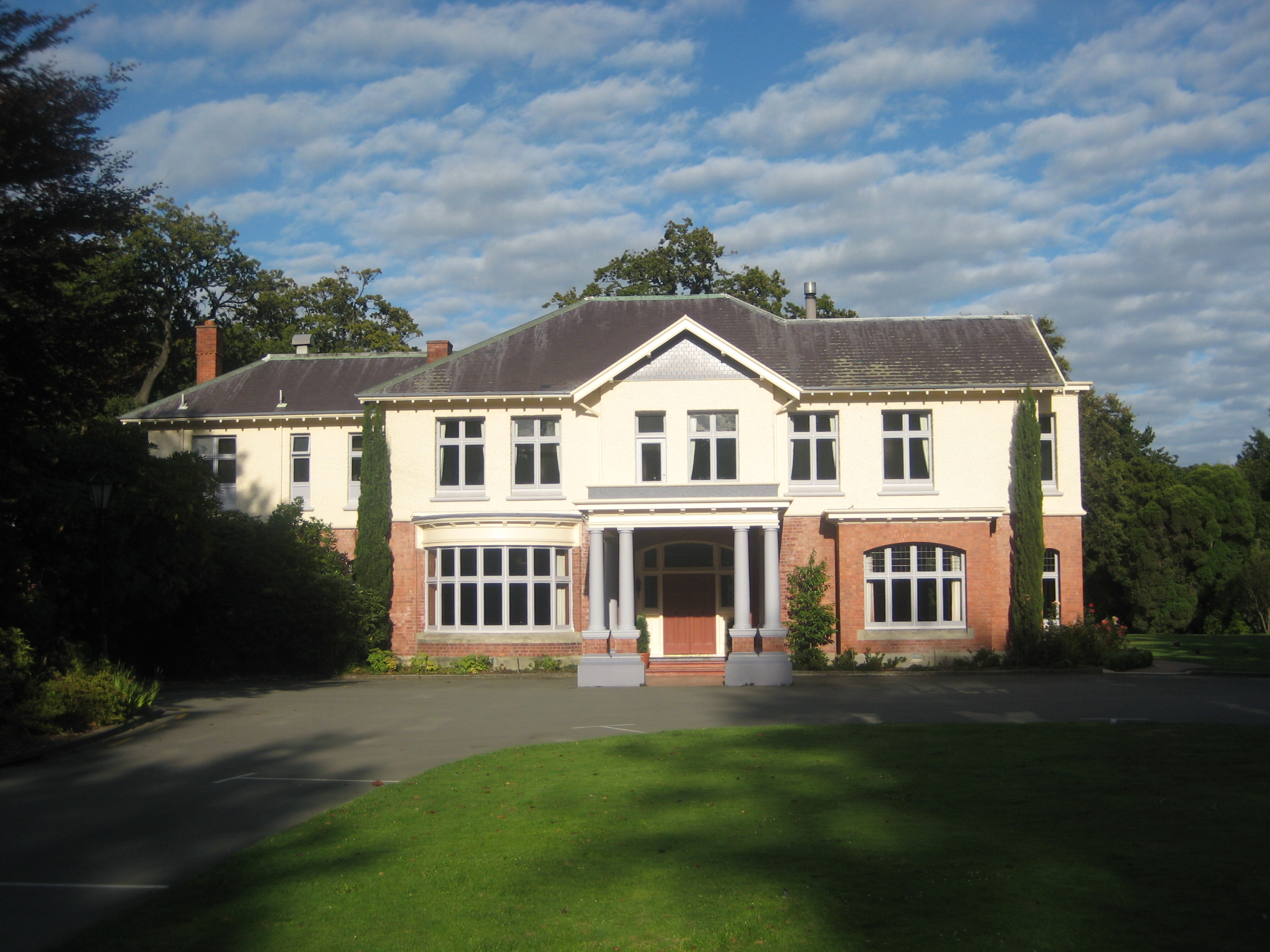
The Ilam Homestead, home of the University of Canterbury Staff Club. The home of Juliet Hulme, during the 1950s.

- Heavenly Creatures (1994) – Based on the Parker–Hulme murder case, Juliet Hulme (later known as Anne Perry) was the daughter of Henry Hulme, the rector of the University of Canterbury, and she and Pauline Parker murdered Honorah Parker, Pauline's mother. During this period Juliet and her family lived on campus in the Ilam homestead (now the University of Canterbury Staff Club), where filming for the movie took place.

== Sources ==
- Gardner, W. Jim; Beardsley, E. T.; Carter, T. E. (1973). Phillips, Neville Crompton (ed.). A History of the University of Canterbury, 1873–1973. Christchurch: University of Canterbury.
- Hight, J., Candy, A. M. F., & Canterbury College. (1927). A short history of the Canterbury College (University of New Zealand): With a register of graduates and associates of the college. Whitcombe and Tombs.
- Scholefield, Guy, ed. (1940a). A Dictionary of New Zealand Biography : A–L (PDF). Vol. I. Wellington: Department of Internal Affairs. Archived (PDF) from the original on 9 March 2012.
- Scholefield, Guy, ed. (1940b). A Dictionary of New Zealand Biography : M–Addenda (PDF). Vol. II. Wellington: Department of Internal Affairs. Archived (PDF) from the original on 27 March 2014.
