= University of Canterbury Faculty of Engineering =

New Zealand academic faculty

- Pūhanga (Māori)
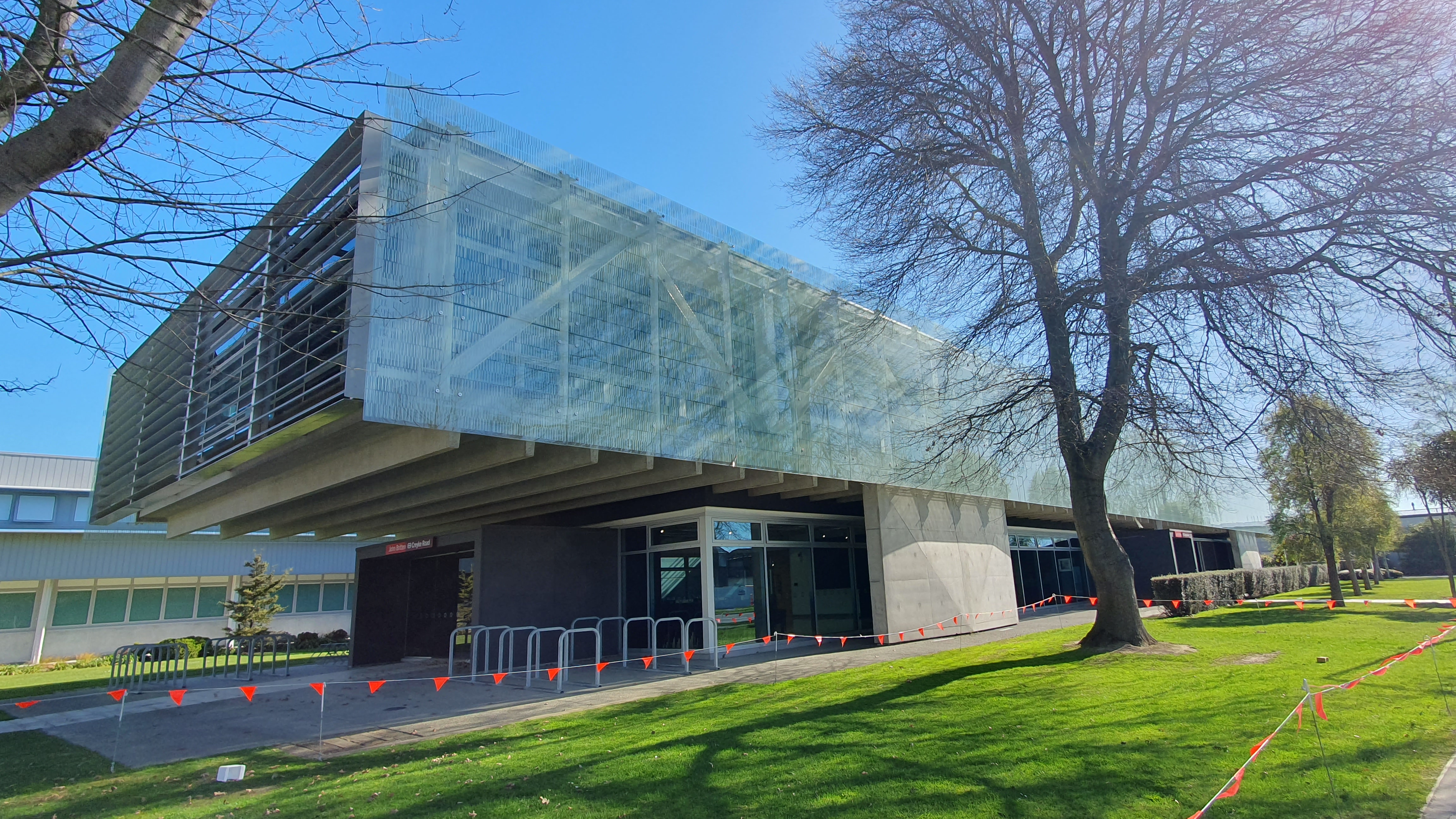
- John Britten Building in September 2023
- Type: Public Engineering School
- Established: 1887; 139 years ago
- Parent institution: University of Canterbury
- Dean: Saurabh Sinha
- Location: Christchurch, New Zealand
- Website: canterbury.ac.nz/engineering

The Faculty of Engineering (Māori: Pūhanga) is the engineering school at the University of Canterbury. The UC faculty of engineering, established in 1887, is New Zealand's oldest engineering school. The faculty awards degrees in engineering, forestry and product design, including the BE(Hons), BProdDesign, BForSc MEng, and PhD.

== History ==
Established in 1887 by Canterbury College, which had been founded in 1873 as a constituent college of the University of New Zealand. Despite some local opposition, the College’s Board of Governors resolved to create a School of Engineering. At the time, it was one of only a few engineering schools in the British Empire, and the first in New Zealand.

The School’s founding staff included Professor Charles Cook, who oversaw the early programme and appointed two part-time lecturers. These included Edward Dobson, Canterbury’s first Provincial Engineer, who lectured in civil engineering well into his seventies, and Robert Julian Scott, Manager of the Addington Railway Workshops. At just 28 years old, Scott left a promising career in the railways to become the School’s full-time Lecturer in Charge. This role was later retitled Professor, and eventually Director in Charge. Demonstrating his dedication to engineering education, Scott initially declined a salary increase in order to prioritise the construction of a purpose-built engineering laboratory.

The first laboratory building was designed by Benjamin Mountfort, then regarded as Canterbury’s leading architect. Completed in 1891 at a cost of £2,740, the building included testing, drawing, lecture and model rooms on the ground floor, and a lecturer’s room and lavatories on the upper floor. The structure remained largely intact until the Canterbury earthquakes of 2011, with only minor internal changes over the decades. In 1890, the Board chairman declared the new building would provide all the accommodation the School needed at the time.

However, the School initially lacked equipment. It was not until 1894 that the Board agreed to purchase its first major apparatus: an experimental steam plant built to Scott’s specifications. This unique and adaptable engine is now held by the Canterbury Steam Preservation Society at its museum at McLeans Island.

Further facilities followed. An electrical laboratory was added in 1902, and a hydraulics laboratory in 1913. The last major additions during Scott’s tenure—new mechanical and electrical laboratories—were nearing completion when he retired due to ill health in 1922. His leadership was instrumental in transforming a small liberal arts college into a respected centre of engineering education.

Between 1887 and 1960, when the School relocated to the Ilam campus, 1,335 students completed engineering degrees.

It offers mechanical engineering.
