= John McMillan (economist) =

New Zealand professor (1951–2007)

- Born: 22 January 1951; Christchurch, New Zealand
- Died: 13 March 2007 (aged 56)
- Occupation: economist

John McMillan (1951 – 13 March 2007) was the Jonathan B. Lovelace professor of economics in Stanford University's Graduate School of Business, and one of the world's leading economic theorists and applied microeconomists. His career was initially marked by important contributions to auction theory and mechanism design. In the 1980s, he worked on the use of incentives in state owned enterprises in China and policies for emerging economies. His recent work has examined entrepreneurship in those economies, as well as the institutional structure for economic development.

Born in Christchurch, New Zealand, John McMillan's undergraduate education was in mathematics and economics at the University of Canterbury. He completed his PhD in economics at the University of New South Wales before moving to the University of Western Ontario, Canada. From 1987 to 1999, he was a professor at the University of California, San Diego, before moving to Stanford University. McMillan died on 13 March 2007, of complications arising from cancer, at age 56.

== Books ==
- Reinventing the Bazaar: A Natural History of Markets, New York, W. W. Norton, 2002.
- Reforming Asian Socialism: The Growth of Market Institutions, Ann Arbor: University of Michigan Press, 1996 (editor, with Barry Naughton)
- Games, Strategies, and Managers, New York and Oxford: Oxford University Press, 1992.
- Incentives in Government Contracting, Toronto: University of Toronto Press, 1988 (with R. Preston McAfee)
- Game Theory in International Economics, New York: Harwood, 1986.
