= Yixiao Sun =

Chinese American Econometrician

Academic background
- Education: Yale University (PhD); Wuhan University
- Doctoral advisor: Peter C.B. Phillips; Donald W.K. Andrews

Academic work
- Discipline: Econometrics
- Institutions: University of California, San Diego

Yixiao Sun is a Professor of Economics at the University of California, San Diego.

Sun received his Ph.D. in Economics from Yale University in 2002. He earned an undergraduate degree in mathematics in 1993 and a master's degree in economics in 1996 from Wuhan University in China.

Sun joined the Department of Economics at UCSD in 2002. He is currently a Professor of Economics and served as the Clive Granger Endowed Chair in Econometrics from 2016 to 2021.

He is currently an editor-in-chief of Econometric Theory alongside Patrik Guggenberger and Liangjun Su. and an associate editor of Journal of Econometrics and Journal of Business and Economic Statistics. Sun is a fellow of the Journal of Econometrics, a recipient of the Plura Scripsit Award (2019) and the Multa Scripsit Award (2007) from the journal Econometric Theory.

Sun's research focuses on time series econometrics, nonparametric methods, machine learning as well as causal inference methods.

== Recent publications ==
- Martinez‑Iriarte, J. & Sun, Y. (2024). "Identification and Estimation of Unconditional Policy Effects of an Endogenous Binary Treatment: An Unconditional MTE Approach." Journal of Econometrics.
- Sun, Y. (2021). "Fixed‑Smoothing Asymptotics in a Two‑Step Generalized Method of Moments Framework." Econometrica.
- Hwang, J. & Sun, Y. (2019). "Simple, Robust, and Accurate F and t Tests in Cointegrated Systems." Econometric Theory.
- Kaplan, D. M. & Sun, Y. (2017). "Smoothed Estimating Equations for Instrumental Variables Quantile Regression." Econometric Theory.
- Chen, X., Liao, Z. & Sun, Y. (2014). "Sieve inference on possibly misspecified semi‑nonparametric time series models." Journal of Econometrics.
