= Werner Ploberger =

Austrian economist

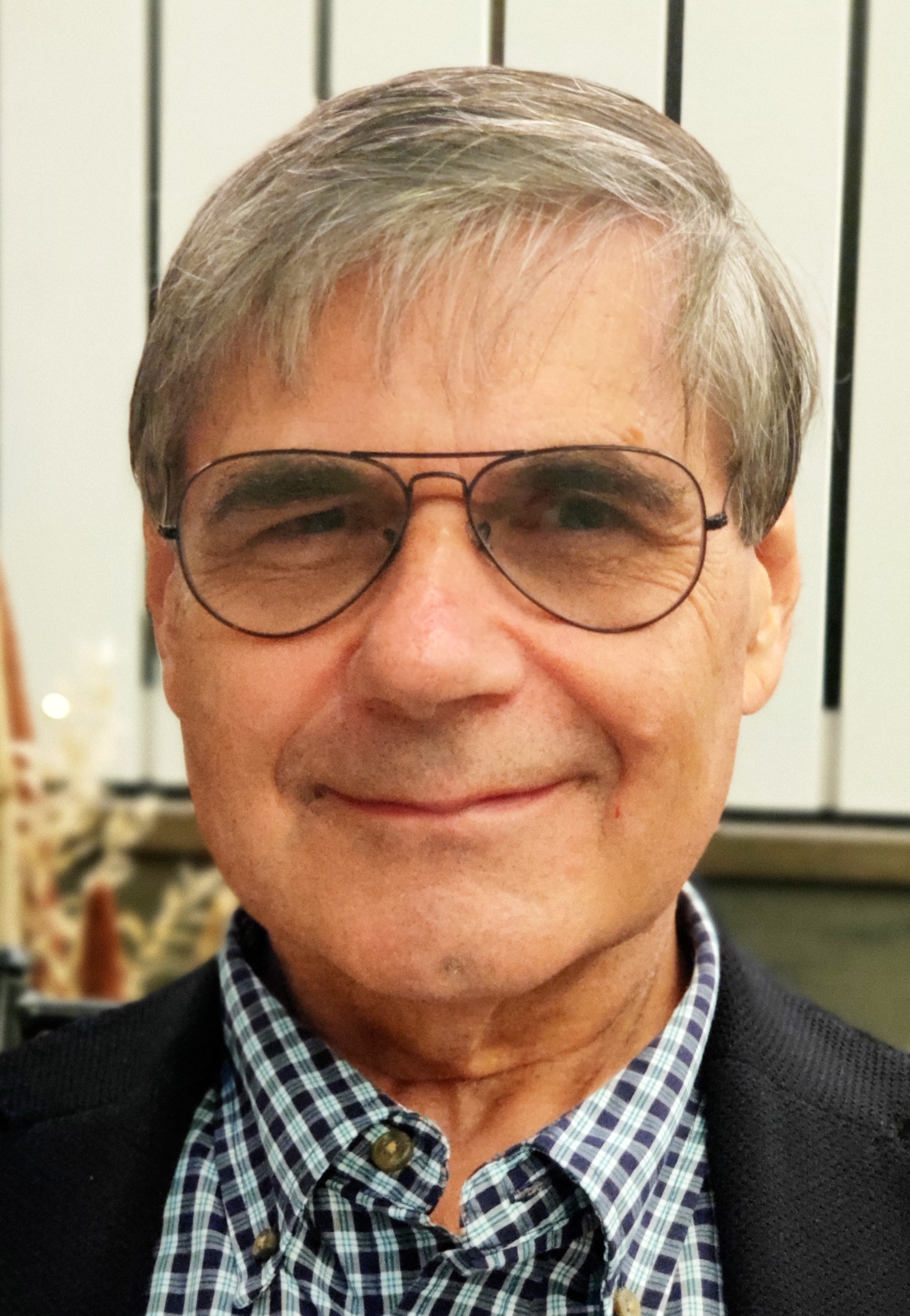
Werner Ploberger 2024

Werner Ploberger (born 5 August 1956 in Vienna) is an Austrian economist. He graduated in mathematics from the Vienna University of Technology. Beginning in 1997, he was a professor of economics at the University of Rochester. Effective July 1, 2006, he is professor of economics at Washington University in St. Louis. He is married to Gabriele Ploberger, and has a son.

== Literature ==
1. Testing for Structural Change in Dynamic Models (with W. Krämer and R. Alt), Econometrica, Vol. 56, No.6, 1988, pp. 1355–1369.
2. A New Test for Structural Stability in the Linear Regression Model (with W. Kraemer and K. Kontrus), Journal of Econometrics, vol. 40, 1989, pp. 307–318.
3. The CUSUM-Test with OLS-Residuals (with W. Krämer), Econometrica, Vol. 60, No. 2, 1992, pp. 271–285.
4. Posterior Odds Testing for a Unit Root with Data-Based Model Selection (with Peter C. B. Phillips), Econometric Theory, Vol.10, No. 3-4, 1994, pp 771–808.
5. Optimal Tests When a Nuisance Parametere is Present Only Under the Alternative (with Donald Andrews), Econometrica, Vol. 62, No. 6, 1994, pp. 1383–1414
6. An Asymptotic Theory of Bayesian Inference for Time Series (with Peter C.B. Phillips), Econometrica Vol. 64, No.2, 1996, pp 381–412
7. Asymptotic Theory of Integrated Conditional Moments Tests (with Herman J. Bierens), Econometrica vol 65 no. 5, 1997, pp. 1129–1145
8. Empirical Limits for Time Series Econometric Models (with Peter C. B. Phillips), Econometrica, Vol. 71(2), 2003, pp. 627–673
