= Brownbagging =

Brownbagging or brown-bagging refers to various uses of a typical brown paper bag:

- Carrying a packed lunch to work or school, frequently in a brown paper bag
- Consuming an alcoholic drink while concealed, usually, but not necessarily, in a brown paper bag, so as to drink in public where such activities are prohibited by law
- Brown bag test, the practice of judging a person's skin color in relation to that of a brown paper bag
- A term for the farming practice of reusing seeds from year to year
