= Kechris =

Kechris is a surname. Notable people with the surname include:

- Alexander S. Kechris (born 1946), Greek-American mathematician
- Katerina Kechris, American statistician
