= Pencil test (South Africa) =

Method of assessing whether a person has kinky hair

The pencil test is a method of assessing whether a person has kinky hair. In the pencil test, a pencil is pushed through the person's hair. How easily it comes out determines whether the person has "passed" or "failed" the test.

This test was used to determine racial identity in South Africa under the apartheid system, distinguishing whites and Indians from coloureds and blacks. The test was partially responsible for splitting existing communities and families along perceived racial lines. Its formal authority ended with the Population Registration Act Repeal Act, 1991.

== Background ==
The Population Registration Act, 1950 required the classification of South Africans into racial groups based on physical appearance and culture. Since a person's racial heritage was not always clear, a variety of tests were devised to help authorities classify people. One such test was the pencil test.

The pencil test involved sliding a pencil or pen in the hair of a person whose racial group was uncertain. If the pencil fell to the floor, the person "passed" and was considered "white" or "Asian". If it stuck, the person's hair type was considered kinky and the person was classified as "coloured" (of mixed racial heritage). The classification as coloured allowed a person more rights than one considered "Black," but fewer rights and duties than a person considered white.

An alternate version of the pencil test was available for Blacks who wished to be reclassified as coloured. In this version, the applicant was asked to put a pencil in their hair and shake their head. If the pencil fell out as a result of the shaking, the person could be reclassified. If it stayed in place, they remained classified as Black.

== Effects ==
As a result of the pencil test, combined with the vagueness of the Population Registration Act, 1950, communities were split apart on interpreted racial lines. In some cases, members of the same family were classified into different groups, and thus were forced to live apart.

In one famous case, a somewhat dark-skinned and kinky-haired girl named Sandra Laing was born to two white parents. In 1966, when Sandra was age 11, she was subjected to a pencil test by "a stranger" and subsequently excluded from her all-white school when she failed the test. She was reclassified from her birth race of white to coloured. Sandra and the rest of her family were shunned by white society. Her father passed a blood type paternity test, but the authorities refused to restore her white classification.

== Reputation and legacy ==
Although the pencil test ended with the Population Registration Act Repeal Act, 1991, the test remains an important part of cultural heritage in South Africa and a symbol of racism worldwide. For example, South African newspaper Mail & Guardian described incidents of mobs "testing" the nationality of suspected (black) foreigners as a "21-st [sic] century pencil test". Another South African commentator describing the same incidents called them "a gruesome re-creation of the infamous pencil test of the apartheid regime".

== See also ==
- One-drop rule – Historical racial classification rule
- Mischling test – Legal test for Jews in Nazi Germany
- Brown paper bag test – 20th-century racial discrimination practice in Black oral history
- Good hair (phrase) – Kinky hair types
