= Byeong Park =

South Korean statistician

Byeong Uk Park is a South Korean statistician working in structured nonparametric regression, semiparametric inference and non-Euclidean data analysis. He is Distinguished Professor at the Seoul National University.

Park received his PhD from the University of California at Berkeley in 1987 working with Peter Bickel. He is a Fellow of the American Statistical Association, the Institute of Mathematical Statistics and the Korean Academy of Science and Technology, and an Elected Member of the International Statistical Institute. He has received the Institute of Mathematical Statistics Carver Medal in 2018 and, as the first statistician, the Inchon Memorial Foundation Inchon Award in 2019. Park was the Laplace Lecturer at the 9th World Congress in Probability and Statistics in 2016 in Toronto. He was also an invited speaker at the International Congress of Mathematicians in 2018 in Rio de Janeiro.

Park was the President of the Korean Statistical Society 2021–2022, a Vice-President of the International Statistical Institute 2019–2023, and served as Scientific Secretary of the Bernoulli Society 2015-19. He was a Co-Editor of Computational Statistics and Data Analysis 2016-2025. He has published over 170 scientific articles in refereed journals.
