= Colorism =

Form of prejudice or discrimination

Discrimination based on skin tone, also known as colorism, shadeism or pigmentocracy, is a form of prejudice and discrimination in which individuals of the same race receive benefits or disadvantages based on their skin tone. More specifically, colorism is the process of discrimination that marginalizes darker-skinned people over their lighter-skinned counterparts. Historically, colorism on a global scale has colonial roots, ranging from early class hierarchies in Asia to its impact on Latinos and African Americans through European colonialism and slavery in the Americas. Colorism focuses on how racism is expressed in the psychology of a people and how it affects their concepts of beauty, wealth, and privilege. A key difference between racism and colorism is that while racism deals with the subjugation of one group by another or the belief in racial supremacy, colorism deals with in-group discrimination in addition to between-group discrimination.

Research has uncovered extensive evidence of discrimination based on skin color in criminal justice, business, the economy, housing, health care, the media, and politics in the United States and Europe. In addition, there has been research that evidently shows biases based on skin tone in the educational system. Students of color are facing higher education costs and inequalities in advanced programs and are targeted by their teachers or peers from other marginalized groups. In addition to this issue being documented in the United States, lighter skin tones have been considered preferable in many countries in Africa, Asia, and Latin America due to internalized colorism. Although less historically significant, prejudice within groups can also be directed toward lighter-skinned individuals, often due to the perception of albinism as a disease. This is referred to as reverse colorism.

== Worldwide ==
Racism affects almost every aspect of contemporary life. Research shows that ethnic minorities are offered fewer opportunities in higher education and employment, are subject to increased scrutiny by police, and are less likely to receive adequate care from physicians. Several meta-analyses find extensive evidence of ethnic and racial discrimination in hiring in the North American and European labor markets. A 2016 meta-analysis of 738 correspondence tests in 43 separate studies done in OECD countries in 1990–2015 finds that there is extensive racial discrimination within both the European and North American hiring processes. Equivalent minority candidates need to send around 50% more applications than majority candidates to be invited for an interview. Mid-2010s research in the U.S. shows that socioeconomic and health inequality among African Americans along the color-continuum is often similar or even larger in magnitude than what exists between whites and African Americans.

== Africa ==
A number of indigenous African groups, such as the Maasai in Kenya and Tanzania, associated pale skin with being cursed or caused by evil spirits associated with witchcraft. They would abandon their children born with conditions such as albinism and showed a sexual preference for darker skin.

Skin whitening treatments and colorism inside of own ethnicity is more common in West and South parts of Africa. In some parts of Africa, people with lighter skin are thought to be more attractive and likely to find more success than those with darker skin tones. In some countries, this barrier has resulted in millions of women and men turning to lighten their skin using treatments, many of which are harmful to the body.

Historically, skin whitening in Africa can be dated to European colonialism, where individuals with lighter skin received greater privilege than those of darker tones. European colonists in Rwanda established a color-based caste system that placed the Tutsi people above the Hutu people on the basis of their somewhat lighter skin, leading to the development of racialized political identities that had not existed in Rwanda before colonialism. The racial hierarchy and color ranking within colonized African nations left psychological effects on many of the darker-skinned individuals.

A 1998 study of 450 people in Nigeria, found that 77.3% of the participants of both genders, reported using skin-lightening cosmetics. A 2003 study of 368 Senegalese women in Dakar, had 52% of the participants report usage of such products. In 1993, a study recorded 25% of Malian women who participated used lightening products. Der Spiegel reports that in Ghana, "When You Are Light-Skinned, You Earn More", and that "[s]ome pregnant women take tablets in the hopes that it will lead their child to be born with fair skin. Some apply bleaching lotion ... to their babies, in the hopes that it will improve their child's chances."

== Asia ==
In South Asia, a preference for lighter skin is prevalent; In East Asian countries, however, it is even more prevalent, using tone-up creams, a strong culture of obsession with sun protection, and whitening creams .

=== East Asia ===
The history of skin color discrimination in East Asia dates back to ancient times. In the ancient dynastic eras, being light-skinned implied wealth and nobility, because those privileged persons could stay indoors while servants had to labor outside. Today, skin color for Asians and Asian Americans has been used to indicate class and beauty within some communities. The old preference for light-skinned women in East Asia is quite different from Western culture, where women of tan and brown complexions are preferred. According to 21st-century research, the younger generation of women in China asserted tan skin as the new female beauty ideal. According to Tai Wei Lim, Chinese women in the media sport bronze complexions, and this is viewed as a reclamation of women's autonomy from the fading Chinese patriarchy. When Asians emigrated, they took their beliefs of colorism with them. Sociologists Joanne Rondilla and historian Paul Spickard argue that Asians in their colorism are not necessarily looking to become White, but rather yearn to be light so they look like the wealthy class.

Skin-lighters and skin-brightening products dominate women's cosmetic stores in Asia. The value of lighter skin has become a multi-billion dollar industry with Asia being a key market with South Asia being the largest consumers of skin-lighteners. A Nielsen survey in 2007 found that 46% of Chinese, 47% of Hong Kongese, 46% of Taiwanese, 29% of Koreans, and 24% of Japanese had used skin lightners during 2006. In 1995, Japan's skin-lightening market exceeded $5 billion. Demand has only increased over the years despite many of these products containing dangerous chemicals such as mercury, hydroquinone, and corticosteroids.

In Taiwan, light skin is the beauty standard and wealthy people tend to be light-skinned while darker people become associated with a lower socioeconomic status.

==== Japan ====
Hiroshi Wagatsuma writes in Daedalus that Japanese culture has long associated skin color with other physical characteristics that signify degrees of spiritual refinement or degrees of primitiveness. In Japan, there is considerable discrimination and stigma against the skin color of white European women. Japanese women commonly state that white women's skin is too pale, or that it is rough, wrinkled, or has too many spots. Sociologist Evelyn Nakano Glenn reported that some Japanese have preferred "ivory-skin" that is "like a boiled egg." Nakano suggests that this preference dates back to the mid-nineteenth century when both upper-class Japanese men and women wore white-lead powder makeup to indicate their status. Today, most Japanese men don't wear makeup, but upper-class Japanese women will still wear the white-lead powder when dressing in formal kimonos for ceremonies.

=== Middle East ===
Skin lightening is a common practice in Jordan. The use of skin lightening products in the Middle East has been attributed to the desire for upword social mobility and attractiveness.

=== South Asia ===
==== India ====
The implications of colorism in India have been apparent since the nation's conception. The legacies of Mughal, Northern, and European colonial rule on the Indian subcontinent have influenced modern relations between light skin and power dynamics. Multiple studies have concluded that preference for lighter skin in India is historically linked to both the caste system and centuries of rule by people from other areas: Persia, Mughal territory, and Europe. The Kamasutra's advice for men to avoid sexual relationship with women who are extremely white or extremely black may reflect an early form of colorism in ancient India.

Although light skin is seen as beautiful within India, this only applies to "Indian" light skin, which is not as light as European skin. Very light skin is considered abnormal within India, and neither light eyes nor light hair are considered beautiful. Channa writes that there is a folk-based prejudice against very light skin, and especially light eyes on women, and recalls how her grandmother told her that green or blue eyes are unattractive features for a woman to have.

Colorism in India was also fed by the attitudes of Europeans, who favored lighter-skinned people for administrative positions and other prominent social positions, so power was conceptually intertwined with light skin. Rich Indians often tend to be light-skinned due to less exposure to the sun. Additionally, individuals were judged by their occupation; being born into a lineage of farmers, for example, would typically make one unable to leave said lineage. Migration between occupations was rare, and though the caste system's legality was altered in 1948, it is still influential and practiced in many parts of the country. As these factors generated the caste system, it grew to include both economic standing and societal positioning. Existing prejudices also influenced European officials. This sentiment remains.

Colorism has societal implications, many of which severely harm the socioeconomic mobility of darker-skinned Indians. These can manifest in gender stereotyping and regional discrimination. Studies of melanin index in individuals across regions show that there are variations in skin color, which contribute to the level of discrimination darker-skinned individuals face in these respective regions. In some regions of India, dark-skinned people are often seen as "dirty" and of lower status than lighter-skinned ones. A light complexion is equated with beauty, racial superiority, and power which continues to have strong influences on marital prospects, employment, status, and income. Most of the girls were denied employment due to their darker skin tone. A few got jobs, but only as out-of-sight ground crew. According to Werdhani et al., persistent colorism is a legacy of the British colonization of India, during which Indian women were hyperfeminized and considered too demure for work by the colonizers, while Indian men were feminized and viewed as inferior to white men.

Graphic of the Indian caste system, displaying social classes and subcategories

Other forms of colorism in India can be seen in the cosmetic industry, where skin bleaching creams are popular. In the Indian film and media industry, most hires are light-skinned, and actors and actresses are often photoshopped to look lighter. Skin lightening cosmetics are shown to have significant side effects, which increase in frequency over time. It is a burden on one's mental health in a societal setting; users of skin creams, on average, remain dissatisfied with their complexion even after using the product. Unregulated products can contain harmful chemicals that can cause dermatitis, chemical burns, and, in severe cases, increase the likelihood of skin cancer and melanoma. As these mechanisms interplay with the presence of existent capitalistic institutions that control much of today's world, the skin-lightening industry benefits this system through the exploitation of vulnerable individuals.

A 2021 article by CNN describes the situation where a woman uses a topical steroid known for its side effect of skin lightening. Steroids are used to combat skin issues like eczema and only under the supervision of a doctor for brief periods as it is bad for your skin. In the wake of the murder of George Floyd, an African-American man in the United States, which led to protests against racism worldwide, the debate about colorism and skin tone in India has been discussed in several media outlets. As part of the general critique, a big Indian matchmaking website, Shaadi.com, removed a filter where one could mark skin color preferences for their potential partner. Outside India, dark-skinned individuals and immigrants are typically treated with the same low level of social respect and acceptance, similar to the experiences they endure within their country.

==== Sri Lanka ====
Fair skin is a beauty ideal in contemporary Sri Lankan society, but has its roots in ancient beauty ideals. Fairness products and other products that include whitening agents are commonly sold in Sri Lanka and are popular among women. Fair-skinned actors and actresses feature prominently in Bollywood films and Korean dramas, both of which are widely popular and influential in Sri Lanka.

=== Southeast Asia ===
In certain Southeast Asian countries such as Malaysia, a common beauty ideal is the "Eurasian look", locally known as the "pan-Asian look" in Malaysia. The overuse of pan-Asian faces on billboards and on television screens has been a controversial issue in the country. The issue was highlighted in 2009 when Zainuddin Maidin, a Malaysian politician, called for the reduction of pan-Asian faces, which he claimed dominated TV and billboards, and instead to increase the number of Malay, Chinese, and Indian faces on local television.

In Indonesia, the "Eurasian look" can be traced to beauty ideals established by white male colonists from the Netherlands. White Dutch male colonists were enamored by the brown skin color and black hair of Indonesian women. They considered Eurasian Indonesian women's darker complexions as more beautiful than the pale-skinned, blond-haired complexions of white Dutch women. The frequency at which young Dutch men married Indo women was considered an embarrassment for the conservative element of Dutch society. The legacy of this Eurasian beauty ideal continues to be reflected in local literature, as it was written in a popular novel that "a golden colored skin is the greatest gift Allah can bestow upon a woman", in reference to a blonde-haired girl who did not inherit her grandmother's complexion.

Despite the controversy surrounding the preference for Malaysians who are of mixed Asian (Malay, Chinese, or Indian) and European descent and possess features such as fair skin, some other experts in the industry have said that the use of pan-Asian faces can be used to promote the racial diversity of Malaysians. As the Minister of Information had suggested in 1993, such faces can also be used to promote a product to a diverse racial demographic because of their mixed appearance.

In Vietnam, some women have been noted to shield their faces and hands from the sun to prevent tanning. The reasoning being that in their culture, dark skin indicated someone was a laborer and worked in fields as opposed to someone who lived a sheltered and privileged life indoors.

In Cambodia, dark skin has been associated with less intelligence, laziness, unattractivness, manual labor, and being of the lower class. Meanwhile, lighter-skinned people are perceived to be more intelligent, ethical, and morally superior.

In the Philippines, sociologist Joanne Rondilla had found that many Filipino women are satisfied with having Asian features, but still desired lighter skin in an effort to "clean up" their image or become a "better" version of themselves.

== Caribbean ==
In Haiti, skin bleaching to lighten one's skin, brown paper bag tests to verify one's skin tone, and degradation of darker-complected Haitians as ugly are contemporary manifestations of colorism. In the Dominican Republic, "Blackness" is often associated with the illegal Haitian migrant minority, who have a lower class status in the Dominican Republic. People who possess more African-like phenotypic features are often victims of discrimination, and are seen as foreigners.

== Europe ==
Native dark skinned African people living in the European Union have reported encountering discrimination based on skin color. Overall, reports of skin color discrimination did not vary by gender, with an equal percentage of men and women (38%) reporting skin color discrimination. A 2019 report by Universities UK found that students' race and ethnicity significantly affect their degree outcomes. According to this report from 2017 to 2018, there was a 13% gap between the likelihood of white students and Black and Minority Ethnic (BAME) students graduating with a first or 2:1 degree classification. A 2023 University of Cambridge survey that featured the largest sample of Black people in Britain found that 88% had reported racial discrimination at work, 79% believed the police unfairly targeted Black people with stop and search powers, and 80% definitely or somewhat agreed that racial discrimination was the biggest barrier to academic attainment for young black students.

== Latin America ==
=== Brazil ===
Brazil has the world's largest population of African descent outside Africa. Racially mixed individuals with lighter skin generally have higher rates of social mobility than mixed-race people with darker skin. There is a disproportionately higher number of people among the mostly European-descended elites than there is among those elites whose members are of visible African descent. There are large health, education, and income disparities between the races in Brazil. A 2016 study finds that skin color is a stronger predictor of social inequality in Brazil than "race" (i.e., the "race-color" categories used on the Brazilian census). This highlights the fact that socially perceived skin color and "race" are not the same thing. Although brown/mixed and Black people comprise more than 50 percent of the population, they comprise less than 25 percent of all of the elected politicians. Another 2016 study, using twins as a control for neighborhood and family characteristics, found that the nonwhite twin is disadvantaged in the educational system. A 2015 study on racial bias in teacher evaluations in Brazil found that Brazilian math teachers gave better grading assessments of white students than equally proficient and equivalently well-behaved Black students. A 2018 paper found that discriminatory hiring and retention policies accounted for 6–8% of the overall racial wage gap.

=== Chile ===
In Chile, there is a wide range of diversity from other cultures and ethnic backgrounds. The diversity in Chile sees colorism through social-economic status, accommodating the preexisting notion that darker skin complexions are less valued. A 2016 study found that Chilean school teachers expected less from their dark-skinned students than they expected from their light-skinned students. Even the differences between being dark and being tanned carry different types of status: being tanned means that they have enough money to go to the beach or buy tanning products. Due to the history of colonization, being darker-skinned (likely descended from enslaved Africans) means that they are automatically considered members of the lower classes. Many Chileans want to have lighter pigmentation as whiteness is associated with economic standing; a mixed-race person may be considered "white" if they are educated and successful.

=== Mexico ===
A 2017 study revealed a 45% gap in educational achievement between the darkest- and lightest-skinned Mexicans and that wealth in the country similarly correlated to skin color. Colorism in Mexico is an ongoing problem that strongly affects people with darker skin tones. Color can affect Mexican citizens' daily lives, their ability to get jobs, and their basic self-esteem. Mexicans have a long history of ancestry from sources other than indigenous people: Spanish, African, German, and other Europeans. The number of Mexicans who identify as mixed race increased from 3 million in 2010 to more than 20 million in 2020 as more individuals began to acknowledge mixed race. Skin color for Mexicans can range from white to black; more than half of Mexican citizens identify as mestizo or mixed race.

A study by Vanderbilt University found that darker skin is strongly associated with decreased wealth and less education. According to Mexico's National Statistics and Geography Institute, the darker the skin tone, the less upward mobility a Mexican citizen may have. This study revealed that Mexicans with the darkest skin tones were the least likely to have finished elementary school. Simultaneously, those with lighter skin tones were more likely to have a university degree. Some of these differences are also attributed to economic differences between people's families of origin, which create gaps between groups.

These findings also indicate that skin tone appears to be associated with educational achievement. Mexicans with the lightest skin tones complete an average of 11 years of schooling, while dark-skinned Mexicans finish an average of 5.3 years of school. A maximal change in skin tone, from lightest to darkest, is associated with a decrease of almost 6 years of schooling, a 51.8% reduction in education. Lighter-skinned Mexicans were more likely to hold positions of power, while those with darker skin tones were more likely to have positions that required a lower level of qualifications. According to a study by Vanderbilt University, the average Mexican household income was about US$193 a month, while lighter-toned citizens reported an average income of US$220 a month. Darker-skinned citizens earned almost 42% less than their white counterparts: US$137 a month. Overall, Mexican populations with lighter skin fall into the highest wealth brackets in Mexico, while those with darker skin fall the lowest.

The average Mexican is located within the 3rd and 4th wealth quintiles, while Mexicans with darker skin tones are averaged below the 2nd wealth quintile. A maximal change in skin tone in Mexico, from lightest to darkest, is associated with a 51.5% decrease in material wealth. This study also found that while 2.5 percent of white Mexicans surveyed by Vanderbilt's pollsters do not have running water, upward of 11 percent of dark-skinned citizens said they lack this basic necessity. Similarly, 7.5 percent of white Mexicans reported lacking an in-home bathroom, while 20 percent of dark-skinned Mexicans lacked such convenience. Researchers concluded that not only does the color of one's skin in Mexico negatively predict economic and educational outcomes, but it is also among the strongest factors found in this study.

Mexico had traditionally celebrated its raza mestiza, or "mixed-race" society. For example, in 2017, President Enrique Peña Nieto declared el mestizaje ("mixed race") to be "the future of humanity". Although more than half of Mexico's population identifies as mixed race, race and skin color have a greater effect on Mexicans' human development and capital accumulation than any other variable. Vanderbilt's results show that the skin color gap in Mexico is two times the achievement gap between northern and southern Mexicans, something that is often referred to in Mexico. Vanderbilt's study shows that the skin color gap is five times greater than the urban/rural divide in Mexico. It has a significantly greater effect on wealth and education than ethnicity (indigenous versus white or mixed) does. When Aeromexico recruited new employees in 2013, they specified "nadie moreno", or no dark-skinned people. This type of colorism and racism in Mexico is often ignored or explained by cultural divides. Because Mexico consists of ethnic, cultural, and linguistic diversity, many Mexicans argue that darker-skinned citizens tend to live in historically disadvantaged and highly indigenous areas.

== North America ==
=== History ===
European colonizers created a racial hierarchy and a race-based ideology, which led to the formation of a structural system of oppression that benefited individuals of European descent over individuals of African descent. Biological differences in skin color were used to justify the enslavement and oppression of Africans and Native Americans, leading to the development of a social hierarchy that placed people of European descent at the top and people of African descent at the bottom. Enslaved people with lighter complexions (usually stemming from the sexual assault of enslaved African women) were allowed to perform less strenuous tasks, like domestic duties, while darker-skinned enslaved people were forced to engage in hard labor, which they usually performed outdoors. African-Americans with greater European ancestry and a lighter skin color were considered smarter than and therefore superior to their darker-skinned counterparts. As a result, they were given greater opportunities for education and the acquisition of land and property. Colorism was a device used by European colonists to create division between enslaved Africans and further the idea that being as close to white as possible was the ideal image. One of the first forms of colorism was slave owners deciding that only light-skinned enslaved people would work in the house while the darker-skinned ones were subjected to the harsh conditions of the fields.

This practice led to a clear division between the slaves, undermining their solidarity against the slave owners. A variety of specific cutoff tests for skin color emerged; the most famous one was the brown paper bag test. If people's skins were darker than the color of a brown paper bag, they were considered "too dark". While the origin of this test is unclear, it is best attested to in 20th-century Black culture. During the time when African Americans were forced into slavery, slave owners would use the "paper bag test", which compared their skin color to a paper bag, to distinguish whether their complexion was too dark to work inside the house.

African Americans' desire for lighter complexions and European features goes back to slavery. Enslaved people with lighter complexions would have the privilege of working indoors, while enslaved people with darker skin were required to work outside in the fields. The complexions of African American slaves reflected how they were treated and the severity of their punishments if they did not comply with the lifestyle that they were forced into. The access to and resources to purchase skincare products or services impacted the notions of colorism among African American women, since enslaved and impoverished Black women were more limited in their grooming, which affected the way they were treated by their masters. For example, light-skinned black women were marketed as "Negroes fit for domestic service" in their masters' homes.

In addition to the bag test, the comb test and the door test were used. The comb test was used to measure the kinkiness of a person's hair. The objective was for the comb to be able to pass through the hair without stopping. The door test was popular in some African American clubs and churches. The people who were in charge of those clubs and churches would paint their doors a certain shade of brown, similar to the brown paper bag test, and if people's skins were darker than the color of the doors, they were not admitted into the establishments. These tests were used to measure what level of "Blackness" was and was not acceptable in the world. Due to lighter-skinned slaves being allowed to work in the house, they were more likely to be educated than darker slaves were, hence the stereotype that dark people are stupid and ignorant. Scholars predict that in the future, the preferred color of beauty will not be black or white, but mixed.

Scholars predict that the United States will adopt a "multicultural matrix", which will help bridge the racial gap in efforts to achieve racial harmony, termed by some a "browning of America". The matrix has four components: that mixed race will help fix racial issues; that it serves as a sign of racial progress; that it suggests that racism is a thing; and that it also suggests that the focus on race is racist due to the lack of racial neutrality. At the same time, some Americans view this "browning" as a sort of demographic replacement, which has led to anxiety among some white Americans who feel that their identity and culture are under attack and will be displaced without changes to the US immigration system.

Eric Peter Kaufmann explored these views among American whites and internationally in the 2018 book Whiteshift: Populism, Immigration and the Future of White Majorities. A parallel as well as an opposite critique of this theory is made by Black scholars, who state that racial neutrality will not eliminate discrimination based on skin color as long as some races continue to be negatively perceived and unfairly treated. As such, racial "browning" would just be another way to erase dark skin without correcting the bad way in which it is perceived. From this point of view, racial harmonization is not a valid response to racism at all. In his 2008 book The Browning of America and the Evasion of Social Justice, Ronald R. Sundstrom writes:

... African American intellectual elites and public figures, as well as other liberals and progressives [perceive] the browning of America to be a threat to long-existing, or even traditional, claims of social justice by Native Americans and especially African Americans. Moreover, not only are their claims somehow threatened, but the very meaning of the legal principles, such as "civil rights," upon which their claims are based, is also experiencing transformation. For those who harbor such fears, the browning of America brings with it yet another opportunity for the nation to evade social justice.

Several authors have noted that a kind of reverse-colorism began to form within the African-American community after the end of slavery. Lighter-skinned African-Americans were seen by some darker-skinned people as being inauthentic, privileged, or even "poisoned" by whiteness. According to Greg Carter, this attitude was held by many prominent black nationalists, including W.E.B. Du Bois and Marcus Garvey. Ibram X. Kendi wrote that colorism is a "collection of racist policies ... substantiated by racist ideas about Light and Dark people". Ronald Hall argues that a form of reverse-colorism may have emerged in the Northern Mariana Islands, where mixed-indigenous ethnic groups have sometimes been rejected as inauthentic or even stigmatized as degenerate, and where varying shades of brown skin have been valued over light skin. In Japan, reverse colorism has acted against white women, whose complexions are stigmatized as too pale or "spotted" in comparison to local Asian women. In Southeast Asia, beauty ideals created by Dutch white male colonists placed brown-skinned Asian women above white women in the female beauty standard, leading to the lower socioeconomic status of blond, light-skinned women in Indonesia.

According to the Pew Research Center, 62% of US Latinos say that having a darker skin color affects their ability to get ahead. This study also showed that 59% of Latinos say that having a lighter skin color helps Hispanic people get ahead. 57% say that discrimination based on skin color towards Latinos is a "very big problem" in the US. Another survey by the Pew Research Center shows that Hispanics with darker skin color are more likely to have experienced at least one instance of discrimination than those with lighter skin color. This study also showed that 42% of Hispanics with darker skin have experienced discrimination or were treated with prejudice by someone who is not Hispanic, while only 29% of those with lighter skin say the same happened to them.

Additionally, 41% of Hispanics with darker skin say they have experienced discrimination by someone who is Hispanic, while only 25% of those with lighter skin color say they have experienced the same. According to these findings, those with darker skin and lighter skin alike feel that skin color affects opportunities and life in the US. For example, 62% of darker-skinned Latinos feel that skin color shapes daily life, while 57% of lighter-skinned Latinos feel the same. Colorism can also affect how Hispanic Americans relate to one another. According to the Pew study, nearly half of Hispanic adults say they have often or sometimes heard a Hispanic friend or family member make comments about other Hispanics that might be considered racist or racially insensitive. About half of Latinos feel that discrimination based on race or skin color is a very big problem.

Bonnie Adrian writes that American culture makes white women feel inferior for having pale complexions and reddish features, and that she risked skin cancer and wrinkles trying to darken her pale skin.

=== Business ===
A 2014 meta-analysis of racial discrimination in product markets found extensive evidence of minority applicants being quoted higher prices for products. A 1995 study found that car dealers "quoted significantly lower prices to white males than to black or female test buyers using identical, scripted bargaining strategies". A 2013 study found that eBay sellers of iPods received 21 percent more offers if a white hand held the iPod in the photo than a black hand. A 2014 study in the Journal of Economic Growth found that anti-Black violence and terrorism, as well as segregation laws, reduced the economic activity and innovation of African Americans.

Into the 21st century, the "thick" Black female body is celebrated within the Black community. According to critical race theorist Gentles-Peart, this does not negate the persistence of white colonialist views that presented black women's stereotypically "thicker" bodies as unattractive. African-Americans have historically faced discrimination in terms of getting access to credit. A 2020 audit study of 17 banks found that Black business owners who sought loans under the Paycheck Protection Program got substantially worse treatment than white business owners. Bus drivers engaged in substantial discrimination against black passengers relative to white passengers.

=== Technology ===
In 2018, a study was published by Dr. Joy Buolamwini and Timnit Gebru evaluating the accuracy of several facial recognition technologies in identifying male and female individuals of varying skin tones. They based the skin tone differences in people included in the dataset on the Fitzpatrick Skin Type classification system, a standard dermatological system for skin tone classification. After their evaluation of three commercially available facial recognition software, Buolamwini and Gebru found that all three products performed better on lighter faces (Skin Types I-III) than darker faces (Skin Types IV-VI). In their evaluation, Microsoft's software had the least discrepancy, with an error rate of 12.9% for darker skinned people and 0.7% for fairer individuals. In contrast, IBM's software performed the worst with an identification error rate of 22.4%, which is "nearly 7 times higher than the IBM error rate on lighter faces". Buolamwini and Gebru also note that the Fitzpatrick Skin Type system is "skewed towards lighter skin and has three categories that can be applied to people perceived as White", implying that the superior performance of facial recognition software on lighter skin tones covers a smaller variety of skin tones than the inferior coverage of the darker skin tones.

=== Criminal justice ===
Research suggests that police practices such as racial profiling, over-policing in areas that are populated by minorities, and in-group bias may all result in disproportionately high numbers of racial minorities among crime suspects. Research also suggests that there is discrimination in the judicial system, including judges, juries, and bail decisions, all of which contributes to a higher number of convictions and unfavorable sentencing for racial minorities. Further research indicates that even when controlling for income and all other factors, children from father-absent families (mother only, mother-stepfather, and relatives/other) were much more likely to be incarcerated. The disproportionate single-parent households of Black youths to those in white family structures is 64% to 24% as of 2019.

==== Policing, arrests, and surveillance ====
A 2019 study, which made use of a dataset of the racial makeup of every U.S. sheriff over a 25-year period, found that "the ratio of Black-to-White arrests is significantly higher under White sheriffs" and that the effects appear to be "driven by arrests for less-serious offenses and by targeting Black crime types". In-group bias has also been observed when it comes to traffic citations, as Black and white cops are more likely to cite out-groups. A 2019 study by the National Institute of Standards and Technology found that facial-recognition systems were substantially more likely to misidentify the faces of racial minorities. Some ethnic groups, such as Asian-Americans and African-Americans, were up to 100 times more likely to be misidentified than white men. A 2018 study in the journal Proceedings of the National Academy of Sciences found that tall young Black men are especially likely to receive unjustified attention by law enforcement. The authors furthermore found a "causal link between perceptions of height and perceptions of threat for Black men, particularly for perceivers who endorse stereotypes that Black people are more threatening than White people."

Analysis of more than 20 million traffic stops in North Carolina showed that Black people were more than twice as likely as white people to be pulled over by police for traffic stops and that Black people were more likely to be searched following the stop. There was no significant difference in the likelihood that Hispanic people would be pulled over, but Hispanic people were much more likely to be searched following a traffic stop than white people. When the study controlled for searches in high-crime areas, it still found that police disproportionately targeted Black individuals. These racial disparities were particularly pronounced for young men. The study found that white people who were searched were more likely to carry contraband than Black and Hispanic people.

A 2020 study in the journal Nature found that Black drivers were stopped more often than white drivers and that the threshold by which police decided to search Black and Hispanic drivers was lower than that for whites (judging by the rate at which contraband was found in searches). A 2021 study in the Quarterly Journal of Economics found similar results. A 2021 study in the American Economic Review found that minorities were significantly less likely to receive discounts on their traffic tickets than white drivers; the study estimated that 42% of Florida Highway Patrol officers practiced racial discrimination. A 2013 report by the American Civil Liberties Union found that blacks were "3.73 times more likely than whites to be arrested for marijuana possession", even though "blacks and whites use drugs, including marijuana, at similar rates".

==== Police killings and use of force ====
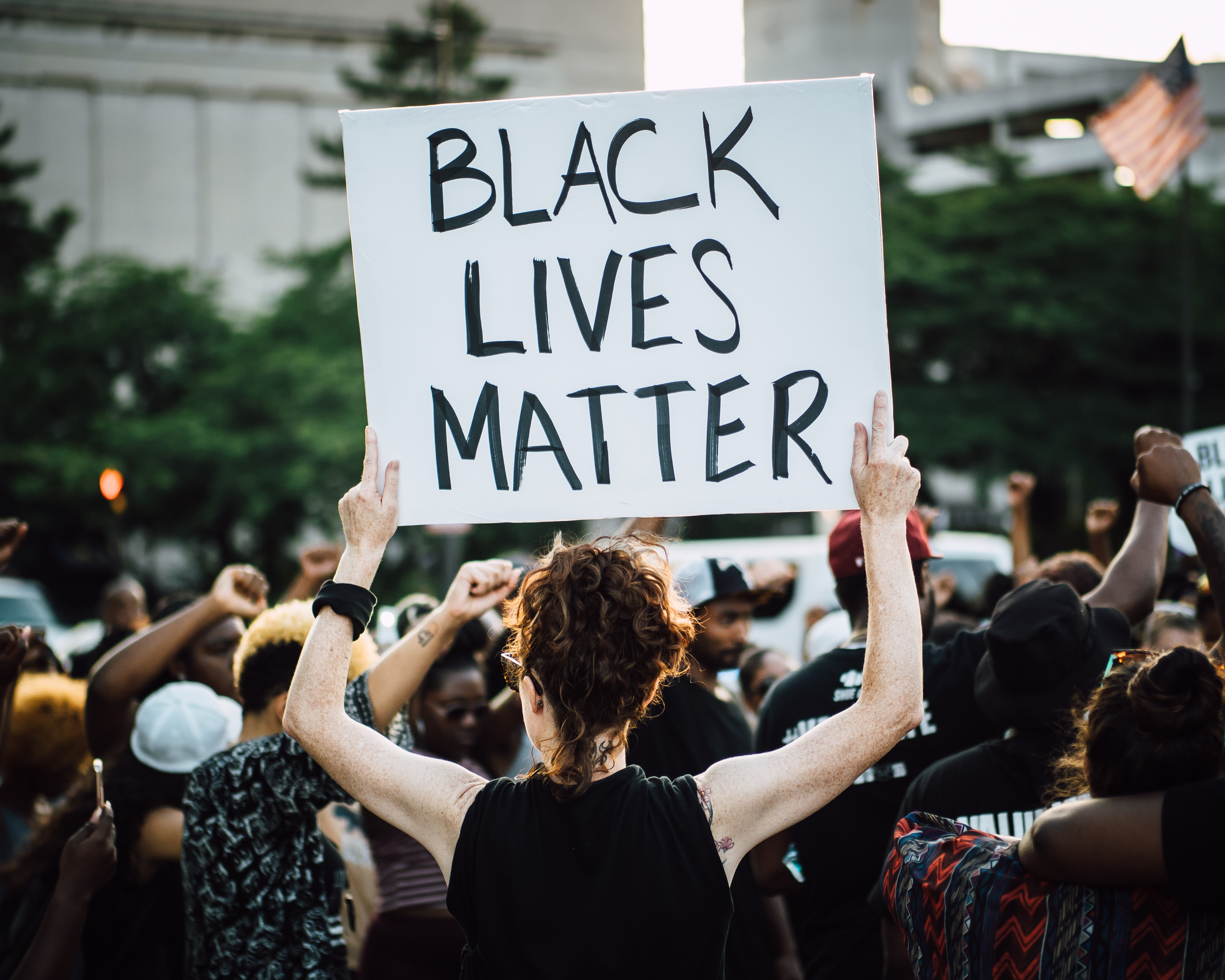
"Black Lives Matter" protests

Racism is present in policing. For instance, the United Kingdom's "stop and search" laws have been disproportionately used against Black people, specifically Black men. Excessive force against Black people is also common in the United States. Police in the United States disproportionately killed unarmed Black Americans compared to unarmed white Americans. These discrepancies led to the creation of the Black Lives Matter (BLM) movement. The movement began in the US in 2012, after the killing of Trayvon Martin, a 17-year-old unarmed African-American, by George Zimmerman. Zimmerman claimed self-defense and was acquitted of murder at trial. The movement skyrocketed after many high-profile killings of unarmed African Americans by the police, including the murder of George Floyd; however, BLM also faces criticism, and the "All Lives Matter" (ALM) movement emerged as a response. Thus, there is an ongoing debate on the motifs of the ALM. Former US President Donald Trump and some other Republicans declared the BLM as racist and the ALM as more inclusive and color-blind.

A 2016 study by Roland G. Fryer Jr., of the National Bureau of Economic Research (NBER) found that while overall "blacks are 21 percent more likely than whites to be involved in an interaction with police in which at least a weapon is drawn" and that in the raw data from New York City's Stop and Frisk program, "blacks and Hispanics are more than fifty percent more likely to have an interaction with police which involves any use of force" after "[p]artitioning the data in myriad ways, we find no evidence of racial discrimination in officer-involved shootings". (Note: Fryer, Roland Gerhard (July 2016). "An Empirical Analysis of Racial Differences in Police Use of Force" (PDF). National Bureau of Economic Research. NBER Working Papers (Revised January 2018 ed.). doi:10.3386/w22399. OCLC 956328193. S2CID 158634577. W22399. Archived (PDF) from the original on 31 October 2020.) The study found bias against Black and Hispanic people in non-lethal and less-extreme lethal violence, stating that "as the intensity of force increases (e.g. handcuffing civilians without arrest, drawing or pointing a weapon, or using pepper spray or a baton), the probability that any civilian is subjected to such treatment is small, but the racial difference remains surprisingly constant", and noting that "[u]ntil recently, data on officer-involved shootings were extremely rare and contained little information on the details surrounding an incident".

After the NBER study was published in the peer reviewed Journal of Political Economy, a comment on it by Steven Durlauf and Nobel Prize in Economics recipient James Heckman of the Harris School of Public Policy Studies at the University of Chicago said, "[i]n our judgment, this paper does not establish credible evidence on the presence or absence of discrimination against African Americans in police shootings." The NBER study's author, Roland G. Fryer Jr., responded by saying Durlauf and Heckman erroneously claim that his sample is "based on stops." Further, he states that the "vast majority of the data ... are gleaned from 911 calls for service in which a civilian requests police presence."

A 2018 study in the American Journal of Public Health found the mortality rate by police per 100,000 was 1.9 to 2.4 for Black men, 0.8 to 1.2 for Hispanic men, and 0.6 to 0.7 for white men. Reports by the Department of Justice have also found that police in Baltimore, Maryland, and Ferguson, Missouri, systemically stop, search (in some cases, strip-search), and harass black residents. A January 2017 report by the DOJ concluded that the Chicago Police Department had "unconstitutionally engaged in a pattern of excessive and deadly force", and an independent task force created by the mayor of Chicago stated that police "have no regard for the sanctity of life when it comes to people of color". A 2018 study found that minorities were disproportionately killed by police, but that white officers were no more likely to use lethal force on minorities than minority officers. A 2019 study in The Journal of Politics found that police officers were more likely to use lethal force on Black people, but that this was "most likely driven by higher rates of police contact among African Americans rather than racial differences in the circumstances of the interaction and officer bias in the application of lethal force."

A 2019 study in the journal Proceedings of the National Academy of Sciences found that Black people and American Indian/Alaska Natives were more likely to be killed by police than white people, and that Latino men were more likely to be killed than white men. According to the study, "for young men of color, police use of force is among the leading causes of death". A separate Proceedings of the National Academy of Sciences (PNAS) study found that there were no racial disparities in police shootings by white police; the findings of the study were disputed by Princeton University scholars, who argued that the study's method and dataset made it impossible for the authors to reach that conclusion. The authors of the original PNAS study corrected their article following the criticism by the Princeton scholars. A study by Texas A&M University economists, which rectified some problems of selection bias identified in the literature above, found that white police officers were more likely to use force and guns than Black police, and that white officers were five times as likely to use gun force in predominantly Black neighborhoods. A 2020 American Political Science Review study estimated that 39% of uses of force by police against Black and Hispanic people in New York City were racially discriminatory.

==== Charging decisions ====
A 2018 study in the Journal of Empirical Legal Studies found that law enforcement officers in Texas who could charge shoplifters with two types of crimes (one more serious, one less so) due to a vaguely worded statute were more likely to charge Black and Hispanic people with the more serious crime. A 2017 report by the Marshall Project found that killings of Black men by whites were far more likely to be deemed "justifiable" than killings by any other combination of races.

==== Legal representation, bail decisions, trials, and convictions ====
A 2019 audit study found that lawyers are less likely to take on clients with Black-sounding names than white-sounding names. A 2018 study in The Quarterly Journal of Economics found that bail judges in Miami and Philadelphia were racially biased against Black defendants, as white defendants had higher rates of pretrial misconduct than black defendants. A 2022 study in the American Economic Review found that New York City judges engaged in racial discrimination against black defendants in bail decisions. A 2012 study found that "(i) juries formed from all-white jury pools convict black defendants significantly (16 percentage points) more often than white defendants, and (ii) this gap in conviction rates is entirely eliminated when the jury pool includes at least one black member". A 2018 National Bureau of Economic Research experiment found that law students, economics students, and practicing lawyers who watched 3D virtual reality videos of court trials (where the researchers altered the race of the defendants) showed a racial bias against minorities. DNA exonerations in rape cases strongly suggest that the wrongful conviction rate is higher for Black convicts than white convicts.

==== Sentencing ====
Research has found evidence of in-group bias, where "black (white) juveniles who are randomly assigned to black (white) judges are more likely to get incarcerated (as opposed to being placed on probation), and they receive longer sentences." A 2018 study in the American Economic Journal: Applied Economics found that judges gave longer sentences, in particular to black defendants, after their favorite team lost a home game. A 2014 study in the Journal of Political Economy found that 9% of the Black-white gap in sentencing could not be accounted for. The elimination of unexplained sentencing disparities would reduce "the steady-state level of black men in federal prison by 8,000–11,000 men [out of the black male prison population of 95,000] and save $230–$320 million per year in direct costs". The majority of the unexplained sentencing disparity appears to occur at the point when prosecutors decide to bring charges carrying "mandatory minimum" sentences. A 2018 paper by Alma Cohen and Crystal Yang of Harvard Law School found that "Republican-appointed judges give substantially longer prison sentences to black offenders versus observably similar non-black offenders compared to Democratic-appointed judges within the same district court."

In criminal sentencing, medium- to dark-skinned African Americans are likely to receive sentences 2.6 years longer than those of whites or light-skinned African Americans. When a white victim is involved, those with more "Black" features are likely to receive a much more severe punishment. A 2016 report by the Sarasota Herald-Tribune found that Florida judges sentence Black defendants to far longer prison sentences than whites with the same background. For the same drug possession crimes, Black people were sentenced to double the time of white people. Black people were given longer sentences in 60 percent of felony cases, 68 percent of the most serious first-degree crimes, 45 percent of burglary cases, and 30 percent of battery cases. For third-degree felonies (the least serious types of felonies in Florida), white judges sentenced Blacks to twenty percent more time than whites, whereas Black judges gave more balanced sentences.

A 2017 report by the United States Sentencing Commission (USSC) found, "after controlling for a wide variety of sentencing factors" (such as age, education, citizenship, weapon possession, and prior criminal history), that "Black male offenders received sentences on average 19.1 percent longer than similarly situated White male offenders". A 2014 study on the application of the death penalty in Connecticut over the period 1973–2007 found "that minority defendants who kill white victims are capitally charged at substantially higher rates than minority defendants who kill minorities... There is also strong and statistically significant evidence that minority defendants who kill whites are more likely to end up with capital sentences than comparable cases with white defendants."

==== Prison system, parole, and pardons ====
A 2016 analysis by The New York Times found that "tens of thousands of disciplinary cases against inmates in 2015, hundreds of pages of internal reports and three years of parole decisions found that racial disparities were embedded in the prison experience in New York". Incarcerated Black and Latino people were sent more frequently to solitary confinement and held there for longer durations than whites. The New York Times analysis found that the disparities were greatest for violations where the prison guards had much discretion, such as disobeying orders, but smaller for violations that required physical evidence, such as possessing contraband. According to a 2011 ProPublica analysis, "whites are nearly four times as likely as minorities to win a pardon, even when the type of crime and severity of sentence are taken into account."

=== Education ===
The U.S. Supreme Court ruled in Brown v. Board of Education (1954) that integrated equal schools should be accessible to all children unbiased to skin color. In the United States, not all state-funded schools are equally funded. Schools are funded by "federal, state, and local governments", while "states play a large and increasing role in education funding", and property taxes support "most of the funding that the local government provides for education". Schools in lower-income areas get less funding than schools in higher-income areas because all funding for education is based on property taxes. The U.S. Department of Education reports that "many high-poverty schools receive less than their fair share of state and local funding, leaving students in high-poverty schools with fewer resources than schools which are attended by their wealthier peers." The U.S. Department of Education also says this fact affects "more than 40% of low-income schools". Children of color are much more likely to suffer from poverty than white children. Furthermore, a 2015 report stated that since Black students finance their education through debt, the chances of them receiving a college degree worsen. Because education does not lead to economic equality for Black employees, the excessive deficit that black students are taking on to pay for their education is widening the wealth disparity between races. Students of color are more likely to have lower educational outcomes because of the wealth differences. The statistics from the report showed the average white college graduate has more than seven times as much wealth as the average black graduate.

A 2015 study that used correspondence tests "found that when they are considering requests from prospective students who are seeking mentoring in the future, faculty were significantly more responsive to White males than they were to all other categories of students, collectively, particularly in higher-paying disciplines and private institutions." Through affirmative action, elite colleges consider a broader range of experiences for minority applicants. A 2016 study in the journal PNAS found that blacks and Hispanics were systemically underrepresented in education programs for gifted children where teachers and parents referred students to those programs; when a universal screening program based on IQ was used to refer students, the disparity was significantly reduced. A 2000 article from the Education Resources Information Center mentioned the inequalities students of color have when accessing advanced classes or programs for gifted students and the statistics showed how this issue is ongoing and has not been minimized. The authors analyzed how schools that serve minorities offer less advanced courses than schools that serve large white populations of students.

The phrase "brown paper bag test", or paper bag party, along with the "ruler test", refers to a ritual that was once done by certain African-American sororities and fraternities that would not let anyone into the group if his or her skin was darker than a brown paper bag. Spike Lee's film School Daze satirized this practice at historically black colleges and universities. Along with the "paper bag test", guidelines for acceptance among the lighter ranks included the "comb test" and the "pencil test", which tested the coarseness of one's hair, and the "flashlight test", which tested a person's profile in order to make sure that their features measured up or were close enough to those of the Caucasian race. A 2013 study used spectrophotometer readings to quantify the skin color of respondents. White women experience discrimination in education, with those women with darker skin graduating from college at lower rates than those with lighter skin. This precise and repeatable test of skin color revealed that white women experience skin color discrimination in education at levels that are consistent with the levels of skin color discrimination experienced by African-Americans. White men are not affected in this way.

=== Health ===
A 2019 review of the literature in the Annual Review of Public Health found that structural racism, cultural racism, and individual-level discrimination are "a fundamental cause of adverse health outcomes for racial/ethnic minorities and racial/ethnic inequities in health." A 2020 study found that black healthcare workers experience racial discrimination, which increases racial harassment and firing rates while decreasing promotional opportunities. A 2020 interview study found that black technicians were treated differently compared to white technicians. When performing a simple procedure, patients were more likely to object to a black technician's work and question their credentials than to a white technician's.

A 1999 study found that doctors treat black and white patients differently, even when their medical files were statistically identical. When shown patient histories and asked to make judgments about heart disease, the doctors were much less likely to recommend cardiac catheterization (a helpful procedure) to black patients. A 2015 study found that pediatricians were more likely to undertreat appendicitis pain in black children than white children. A 2017 study found that medical staff treating anterior cruciate ligament injuries perceived black collegiate athletes as having higher pain tolerance than white athletes. A study by University of Toronto and Ohio State University economists found substantial evidence of racial discrimination against black veterans in terms of medical treatment and awarding of disability pensions in the late 19th and early 20th centuries; the discrimination was substantial enough to account for nearly the entire black-white mortality gap in the period. A 2019 study in Science found that one widely used algorithm to assess health risks falsely concluded that "Black patients are healthier than equally sick White patients", thus leading health care providers to provide lower levels of care for black patients. A 2020 study found that "when Black newborns are cared for by Black physicians, the mortality penalty they suffer, as compared with White infants, is halved." The 2020 study was debunked in 2024.

A 2020 study published in The New England Journal of Medicine examined racial bias in pulse oximetry measurement. Pulse oximeters are a medical device that is commonly attached to a patient's finger and uses a sensor to measure light that has traveled through the skin to determine oxygen saturation in blood. Oxygen saturation is an important vital that quantifies of the amount of oxygen in the bloodstream. The purpose of the study was to identify cases of occult hypoxemia, which the study defined as cases where a subject had "an arterial oxygen saturation of <88% despite an oxygen saturation of 92 to 96% on pulse oximetry". There are different forms of medical intervention recommended at oxygen saturation levels at <88% and 92%, and below 90% organs such as the brain, heart, and lungs become at risk for organ damage. The study found that "Black patients had nearly three times the frequency of occult hypoxemia that was not detected by pulse oximetry as White patients". Pulse Ox devices are used frequently for medical decision making, potentially resulting in disparate outcomes for darker and lighter skin patients when choices are made based on pulse oximeters for supplemental oxygen (especially when hospitals are overwhelmed, like during the COVID-19 pandemic).

A 2018 ProPublica analysis found that African Americans and Native Americans were underrepresented in clinical trials of new drugs. Fewer than 5% of patients were African-American, even though they make up 13.4% of the total US population. African-Americans were even underrepresented in trials involving drugs intended for diseases that disproportionately affect African-Americans. As a result, African-Americans who have exhausted all other treatments have weaker access to experimental treatments. Studies have argued that there are racial disparities in how the media and politicians act when they are faced with cases of drug addiction in which the victims are primarily black rather than white, citing the examples of how society responded differently to the crack epidemic than it responded to the opioid epidemic. The biases that underrepresentation of dark skin tone images creates ultimately exacerbate disparities in dermatologic outcomes between patient populations with light and dark skin tones. Furthermore, racial discrimination between healthcare workers is also important due to its linkage to mental health and job satisfaction.

=== Housing and land ===
A 2014 meta-analysis found extensive evidence of racial discrimination in the American housing market. Minority applicants for housing needed to make many more inquiries to view properties. Geographical steering of African-Americans in US housing remains significant. A 2003 study found "evidence that agents interpret an initial housing request as an indication of a customer's preferences but are also more likely to withhold a house from all customers when it is in an integrated suburban neighborhood (redlining). Moreover, agents' marketing efforts increase with asking price for white, but not for black, customers; blacks are more likely than whites to see houses in suburban, integrated areas (steering); and the houses agents show are more likely to deviate from the initial request when the customer is black than when the customer is white. These three findings are consistent with the possibility that agents act upon the belief that some types of transactions are relatively unlikely for black customers (statistical discrimination)." Real estate appraisers discriminate against black homeowners. Historically, there was extensive and long-lasting racial discrimination against African-Americans in the housing and mortgage markets in the United States, as well as massive discrimination against black farmers, whose numbers massively declined in post-WWII America due to local and federal anti-black policies. Government actions in part facilitated racial discrimination in the housing market, leading to substantial and persistent racial residential segregation and contributing to the racial wealth gap.

According to a 2019 analysis by University of Pittsburgh economists, blacks faced a two-fold penalty due to the racially segregated housing market: rental prices increased in blocks when they underwent racial transition, whereas home values declined in neighborhoods that blacks moved into. A 2016 study found that industrial use zoning in Chicago tended to be allocated to neighborhoods that were populated by racial minorities. A report by the federal Department of Housing and Urban Development revealed that when the department sent African-Americans and whites to look at apartments, African-Americans were shown fewer apartments to rent and fewer houses for sale than whites were. A 2017 study found "that applications [for Airbnb housing] from guests with distinctively African American names are 16 percent less likely to be accepted relative to identical guests with distinctively white names." A 2020 audit study of Boston found that prospective white renters were 32 percentage points more likely to be shown an apartment than similar prospective black renters.

A 2017 paper by Troesken and Walsh found that pre-20th century cities "created and sustained residential segregation through private norms and vigilante activity" but that "when these private arrangements began to break down during the early 1900s", whites started "lobbying municipal governments for segregation ordinances". As a result, cities passed ordinances that "prohibited members of the majority racial group on a given city block from selling or renting property to members of another racial group" between 1909 and 1917. Government policies have contributed significantly to the racial gap in homeownership because various government policies and benefits have made it easier for whites to become homeowners relative to blacks. A 2017 study by Federal Reserve Bank of Chicago economists found that the practice of redlining—the practice whereby banks discriminated against the inhabitants of certain neighborhoods—had a persistent adverse impact on the neighborhoods, with redlining affecting homeownership rates, home values, and credit scores in 2010. Since many African-Americans could not access conventional home loans, they had to turn to predatory lenders, who charged high interest rates. Due to lower home ownership rates, slumlords were able to rent out apartments that would otherwise be owned. A 2019 analysis estimated that predatory housing contracts targeting African-Americans in Chicago in the 1950s and 1960s cost black families between $3 billion and $4 billion in wealth.

A 2017 study in Research & Politics found that white supporters of Donald Trump became less likely to approve of federal housing assistance when they were shown an image of a black man. A 2018 study in the American Sociological Review found that housing market professionals (real estate agents, housing developers, mortgage appraisers, and home value appraisers) held derogatory racial views about black and Latino individuals and neighborhoods, whereas white individuals and neighborhoods were beneficiaries of widely shared, positive racial beliefs. A 2018 experimental study by University of Illinois and Duke University economists found that real estate agents and housing providers systematically recommended homes in neighborhoods with higher poverty rates, greater pollution, higher crime rates, fewer college-educated families, and fewer skilled workers to minority individuals who had all the same characteristics as white individuals except ethnic differences.

A 2018 study in the American Political Science Review found that white voters in areas that experienced massive African-American population growth between 1940 and 1960 were more likely to vote for California Proposition 14 (1964), which sought to enshrine legal protections for landlords and property owners who discriminated against "colored" buyers and renters. A 2018 study in the Journal of Politics found extensive evidence of discrimination against blacks and Hispanics in the New York City rental market. A 2018 study in the journal Regional Science and Urban Economics found that there was discrimination against blacks and Arab males in the U.S. rental market. A 2018 study in the Journal of Regional Science found that "black households pay more for identical housing in identical neighborhoods than their white counterparts ... In neighborhoods with the smallest fraction white, the premium is about 0.6%. In neighborhoods with the largest fraction white, it is about 2.4%." A 2022 study found that ethnic minority hosts on Airbnb charge lower prices due to discrimination by consumers.

=== Labor market ===
Several meta-analyses find extensive evidence of ethnic and racial discrimination in hiring in the American labor market. A 2017 meta-analysis found "no change in the levels of discrimination against African Americans since 1989, although we do find some indication of declining discrimination against Latinos." A 2016 meta-analysis of 738 correspondence tests – tests where identical CVs for stereotypically black and white names were sent to employers – in 43 separate studies conducted in OECD countries between 1990 and 2015 finds that there is extensive racial discrimination in hiring decisions in Europe and North America. These correspondence tests showed that equivalently, minority candidates need to send around 50% more applications to be invited for an interview than majority candidates. A study that examined the job applications of actual people provided with identical résumés and similar interview training showed that African-American applicants with no criminal record were offered jobs at a rate as low as white applicants who had criminal records. A 2018 National Bureau of Economic Research paper found evidence of racial bias in how CVs were evaluated. A 2020 study found that there is not only discrimination towards minorities in callback rates in audit studies, but that the discrimination gets more severe after the callbacks in terms of job offers. A 2022 study involving 83,000 job applications sent to the 108 largest U.S. employers found that employers consistently favored applications with distinctively white names over black names. A 2021 study found discrimination among Swiss job recruiters against immigrant and minority groups.

Research suggests that light-skinned African American women have higher salaries and greater job satisfaction than dark-skinned women. In the 2010, being "too black" was acknowledged by the U.S. Federal courts in an employment discrimination case under Title VII of the Civil Rights Act of 1964. In Etienne v. Spanish Lake Truck & Casino Plaza, LLC (2013), the United States Court of Appeals for the Fifth Circuit determined that an employee who was told on several occasions that her manager thought she was "too black" to do various tasks found that the issue of the employee's skin color rather than race itself played a key role in an employer's decision to keep the employee from advancing. A 2018 study found evidence suggesting discrimination against immigrants with darker skin colors. A 2019 experimental study found that there was a bias against blacks, Latinos, and women in the hiring of postdocs in the fields of biology and physics. A 2020 study, which used a natural experiment with sun exposure and tans, found that darker-skinned individuals are discriminated against in the labor market. A 2008 study found that black service providers receive lower tips than white service providers. Research shows that "ban the box" (the removal of the check box asking job applicants if they have criminal records) leads employers to discriminate against young, black, low-skilled applicants, possibly because employers simply assume these applicants have checkered pasts when they are not able to confirm it.

=== Media ===
Colorism in movies, print, and music can take several forms. It can be the representation of people of color in an ill light, the hiring of actors based on their skin color, the use of colors in costumes with the intention to differentiate between good and evil characters, or simply failing to represent people of color at all. African Americans with lighter skin tone and "European features", such as lighter eyes and smaller noses and lips, have more opportunities in the media industry. For example, film producers hire lighter-skinned African Americans more often, television producers choose lighter-skinned cast members, and magazine editors choose African American models that resemble European features. A content analysis conducted by Scott and Neptune (1997) shows that less than one percent of advertisements in major magazines featured African American models. When African Americans did appear in advertisements, they were mainly portrayed as athletes, entertainers, or unskilled laborers. In addition, seventy percent of the advertisements that featured animal print included African American women. Animal print reinforces the stereotypes that African Americans are animalistic in nature, sexually active, less educated, have lower income, and are extremely concerned with their personal appearances. Concerning African American males in the media, darker-skinned men are more likely to be portrayed as violent or more threatening, influencing the public perception of African American men. Since dark-skinned males are more likely to be linked to crime and misconduct, many people develop preconceived notions about the characteristics of black men.

Colorism was, and still is, very evident in the media. An example of this is the minstrel shows that were popular during and after slavery. Minstrel shows were a very popular form of theater that involved white and black people in blackface, portraying black people while doing demeaning things. The actors painted their faces with black paint and overlined their lips with bright red lipstick to exaggerate and make fun of black people. When minstrel shows died out and television became popular, black actors were rarely hired, and when they were, they had very specific roles. These roles included being servants, slaves, idiots, and criminals. The absence of people of color in media, in settings where they normally should be present, is also called erasure.

=== Politics ===
A 2011 study found that white state legislators of both political parties were less likely to respond to constituents with African-American names. A 2013 study found that in response to e-mail correspondence from a putatively black alias, "nonblack legislators were markedly less likely to respond when their political incentives to do so were diminished, black legislators typically continued to respond even when doing so promised little political reward. Black legislators thus appear substantially more intrinsically motivated to advance blacks' interests." Some research suggests that white voters' voting behavior is motivated by racial threat. A 2016 study, for instance, found that white Chicago voters' turnout decreased when public housing was reconstructed and 25,000 African Americans were displaced. This suggests that white voters' turnout decreased due to not living in proximity to African-Americans.

Voter ID laws have brought on accusations of racial discrimination. In a 2014 review by the Government Accountability Office of the academic literature, three studies out of five found that voter ID laws reduced minority turnout, whereas two studies found no significant impact. Disparate impact may also be reflected in access to information about voter ID laws. A 2015 experimental study found that election officials queried about voter ID laws are more likely to respond to emails from a non-Latino white name (70.5% response rate) than a Latino name (64.8% response rate), though response accuracy was similar across groups. Studies have also analyzed racial differences in ID request rates. A 2012 study in the city of Boston found that black and Hispanic voters were more likely to be asked for ID during the 2008 election. According to exit polls, 23% of whites, 33% of blacks, and 38% of Hispanics were asked for ID, though this effect is partially attributed to blacks and Hispanics preferring non-peak voting hours when election officials inspected a greater portion of IDs. Precinct differences also confound the data, as black and Hispanic voters tended to vote in black and Hispanic-majority precincts. A 2010 study of the 2006 midterm election in New Mexico found that Hispanics were more likely to incur ID requests, while early voters, women, and non-Hispanics were less likely to incur requests. A 2009 study of the 2006 midterm election nationwide found that 47% of white voters reported being asked to show photo identification at the polls, compared with 54% of Hispanics and 55% of African Americans. Very few were, denied the vote as a result of voter identification requests. A 2015 study found that turnout among blacks in Georgia was generally higher since the state began enforcing its strict voter ID law. A 2016 study by University of California, San Diego researchers found that voter ID laws "have a differentially negative impact on the turnout of Hispanics, Blacks, and mixed-race Americans in primaries and general elections."

Research by University of Oxford economist Evan Soltas and Stanford political scientist David Broockman suggests that voters act upon racially discriminatory tastes. A 2018 study in Public Opinion Quarterly found that whites, in particular those who had racial resentment, largely attributed Obama's success among African-Americans to his race and not his characteristics as a candidate or the political preferences of African-Americans. A 2018 study in the journal American Politics Research found that white voters tended to misperceive political candidates from racial minorities as being more ideologically extreme than objective indicators would suggest; this adversely affected the electoral chances for those candidates. A 2018 study in The Journal of Politics found that "when a white candidate makes vague statements, many [nonblack] voters project their own policy positions onto the candidate, increasing support for the candidate. But they are less likely to extend black candidates the same courtesy. ... In fact, black male candidates who make ambiguous statements are actually punished for doing so by racially prejudiced voters."

A 2018 study found evidence of racial-motivated reasoning as voters assessed President Barack Obama's economic performance. The study found that "Whites attributed more responsibility to Obama under negative economic conditions (i.e., blame) than positive economic conditions (i.e., credit). ... Whites attributed equal responsibility to the president and governors for negative economic conditions, but gave more responsibility to governors than Obama for positive conditions. Whites also gave governors more responsibility for state improvements than they gave Obama for national ones." It is also alleged that during his senatorial run in 2008 against former senator and later presidential candidate Hillary Clinton, Clinton's campaign team intentionally darkened Obama's face while running campaign ads. Although her camp denied the accusations, the intention, whether apparent or not, stems from the system of colorism and viewing or equating darker skin tones as bad and in a negative light.

A 2018 study examining "all 24 African American challengers (non-incumbents) from 2000 to 2014 to white challengers from the same party running in the same state for the same office around the same time" found "that white challengers are about three times more likely to win and receive about 13 percentage points more support among white voters. These estimates hold when controlling for a number of potential confounding factors and when employing several statistical matching estimators." A 2019 study found that whites are less supportive of welfare when they are told that blacks are the majority of recipients (as opposed to whites); however, when informed that most welfare recipients eventually gain jobs and leave the welfare program, this racial bias disappears. An analysis by MIT political scientist Regina Bateson found that Americans engage in strategic discrimination against racial minority candidates out of a belief that they are less electable than white male candidates. "In the abstract, Americans consider white men more "electable" than equally qualified black and female candidates. Additionally, concerns about winning the votes of white men can cause voters to rate black and female Democratic candidates as less capable of beating Donald Trump in 2020." A 2019 paper found, using smartphone data, that voters in predominantly black neighborhoods waited far longer at polling places than voters in white neighborhoods. A 2021 study in the American Political Science Review found that black protestors were perceived to be more violent in protests than white protestors when they were protesting for the same goals.

=== Beauty ===
Studies have shown that, due to societal influences, many people associate beauty with lighter skin. This is especially evident in children. This belief has led dark-skinned children to feel ashamed of who they are, and it also causes them to feel inferior whenever they are compared to people with lighter skin. Many African American women believe that they would have better luck dating if they had lighter skin, especially when they date African American men.

Jones and Shorter-Gooden (2003) presented the Lily Complex as a method that modifies and hides the original facial features. This is done to assimilate into the mainstream post-colonial culture and to be accepted according to Eurocentric standards of beauty. The lily complex stresses that the pressure to follow the feminine beauty ideal that is fake and mostly unachievable can make black women insecure. Their self-esteem is shattered because of the criticism of their natural appearance. Thus, they consider themselves undeserving of safety, health, and success.

Advertisement campaigns and cosmetic brands also enforce a certain sense of superiority for being white and having a fair skin tone, encouraging the use of fairness creams. In India, skin-whitening products have been the highest-selling, with increasing consumers. A print media brand in India published a collage that also organized the annual beauty pageant. The collage included 30 women with the same skin tone, which is towards the fairer end. The limited diversity in the poster imitates India's obsession with a fair skin tone. Moreover, Bollywood films also play a vital part in idealizing fair-skinned heroines.

European beauty standards continue to have a long-lasting impact within American society, not only on African American women, children, and men but also on those from different nations. In an article written by Susan L. Bryant, she mentions a study by Kenneth and Mamie Clark referred to as the "Doll Test", which became more widely known because of the Supreme Court case Brown v. Board of Education. In her article, Bryant states that the European beauty standard is "the notion that the more closely associated a person is with European features, the more attractive he or she is considered; these standards deem attributes that are most closely related to whiteness, such as lighter skin, straight hair, a thin nose and lips, and light colored eyes, as beautiful."

The study was an experiment where 253 black children ages three to seven were shown two identical dolls, one black and one white, in a nursery and public school located in Arkansas and Massachusetts. Two-thirds of the children indicated that they liked the white dolls better, in spite of those children being black. Over the years, the experiment has been repeated and still results in a clear preference for the lighter-skin doll and an internalization of self-hatred among black children because of unaddressed European beauty standards. It also found that a child's environment and family life can serve as the biggest influence on their ideals of what is acceptable or unacceptable as to what they define in terms of beauty.

=== Asian Americans ===
Colorism for Asian Americans in the United States is a multifaceted system that is the result of a complex set of social and historical context.In some parts of Asia, it is believed that skin color is an indicator of economic status and beauty. As Asians immigrated to other countries, so did their colorism. This has led to issues with discrimination among the Asian American community. For Asian Americans, colorism has also merged with ideologies of White supremacy imposed by European colonialism since both structures have a preference for white skin.

Kim D. Chanbonpin, a professor of law at the John Marshall Law School, argues that Asian American colorism can also provide important insights into how anti-Black prejudice is formed and enacted. Chanbonpin argues that Asian Americans can both assert their own identities while redeploying structures of racism against others, particularly Black Americans. Chanbonpin goes on to say that anti-Black ideology in the Asian American community is reinforced by colorism and racial hierarchy. Chanbonpin uses the Filipino GMA Network show "Nita Negrita", which features a Filipino lead actor in blackface, since it reinforces colorism and racial attitudes in the Philippines. Chanbonpin goes on to say that these views carry over as Filipinos migrate to the United States. Simultaneously, colorism impacts intra-racial and inter-ethnic relationships between different Asian American groups with darker-skinned Asian American groups often being thought of negatively due to their skin tone.

Colorism tends to affect first generation immigrants more than the following generations. Sociologist Joanne Rondilla indicates that many Asian American immigrant women feel more pressure to assimilate into the United States than non-immigrant generations that follow. Because of this, they are also more prone to use skin-lightners than the following generations. Rondilla also argues that Asian American immigrants views on skin color may also affect their expectations for their children since their home countries already value lighter skin and they have a desire for assimilation that merges with the typical idea that an American is someone with Eurocentric features.

Shyla Sahera Khan, a psychological researcher at the University of Tennessee at Chattanooga, conducted a study in 2025 about the relation of frequency of colorism messages and its affect on mental well-being for South Asian women. Sahera Khan found that colorism in cultural environments such as media and social groups had a significant affect on reinforcing internalized beauty standards, self-perception, and the use of skin-lightening products. Sahera Khan's study also found that second-generation South Asian women in the United States had less skin-lightening behaviors compared to first-generation immigrants and women overseas in South Asia. Sahera Khan argues that collaboration between healthcare providers, educators, religious leaders, and community organizations can encourage the celebration of diverse beauty ideals and increase mental well-being.

=== Sports ===
A 2018 study found evidence that non-black voters in Heisman Trophy voting were biased against non-black players. A 2021 study found that black NBA players were 30% more likely to exit the league in any given season than white players with similar player statistics. A 2019 study found that after controlling for objective measures of performance, broadcast commentators were "more likely to discuss the performance and mental abilities of lighter-skinned players and the physical characteristics of darker-skinned players" in the Men's Division I Basketball Tournament.

A 2020 report found that football commentators were more likely to praise white players for their intelligence and leadership qualities while criticizing black players for lacking those attributes. Black players were four times more likely to be praised for their strength and seven times more likely to be praised for their speed. A 2017 study found that racially resentful whites become less likely to favor salaries for college athletes when they are primed to think about African Americans.

== See also ==
- Apartheid
- Black nationalism
- Black Power
- Black Power movement
- Black supremacy
- Colonial mentality
- Dusky Peril
- Fitzpatrick scale for skin color
- Hoteps
- Internalized racism
- Mormon teachings on skin color
- One-drop rule
- Persecution of people with albinism
- Racial nationalism
- Tanning dependence
- White Australia policy
- White genocide conspiracy theory
- White nationalism
- White supremacy
- Yellow Peril
