= Elizaveta Levina =

Russian and American mathematical statistician

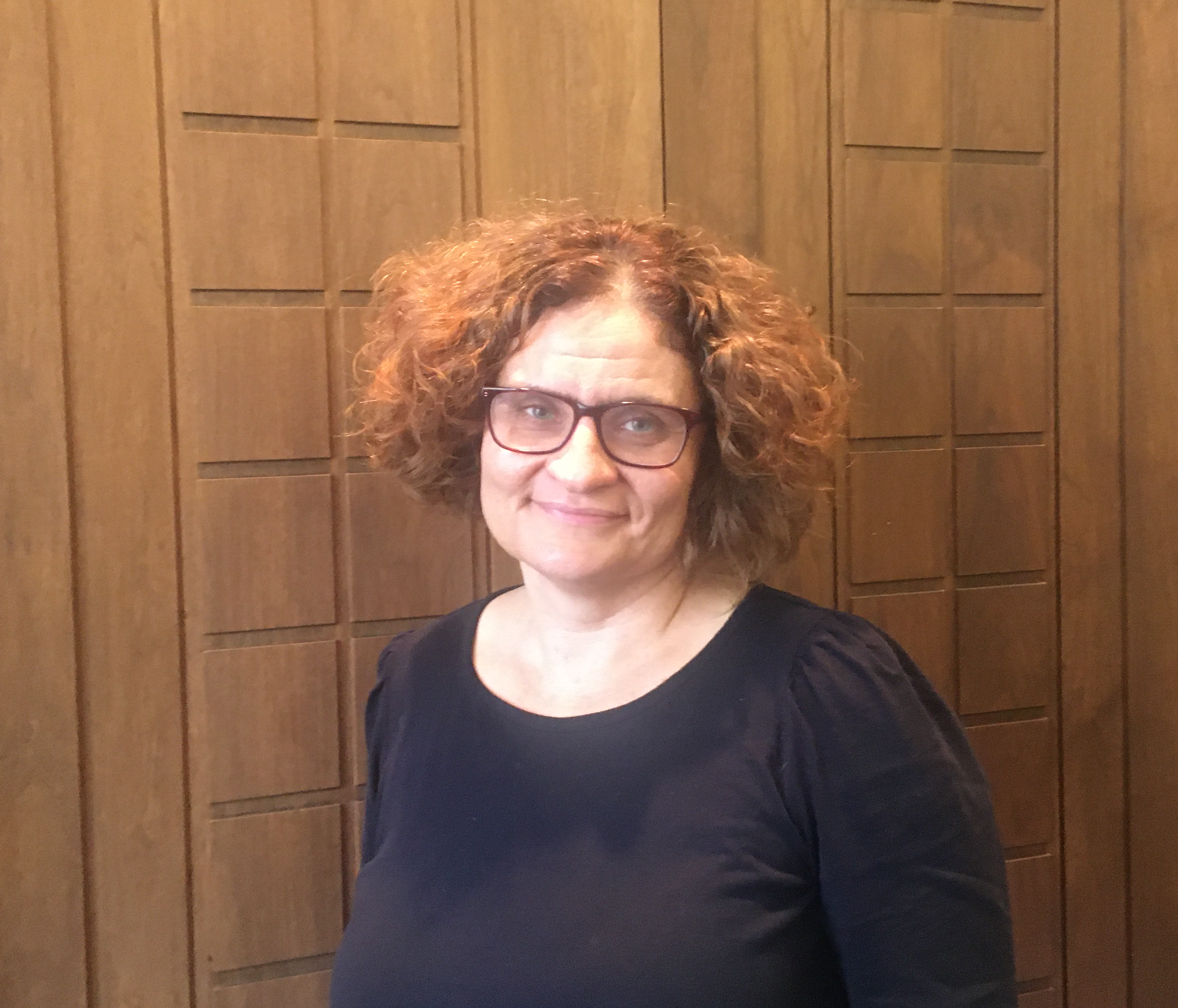
- Elizaveta Levina in 2023
- Scientific career
- Fields: Statistics
- Institutions: University of Michigan

Elizaveta (Liza) Levina is an American mathematical statistician of Russian descent. She is the Vijay Nair Collegiate Professor of Statistics at the University of Michigan, and is known for her work in high-dimensional statistics, including covariance estimation, graphical models, statistical network analysis, and nonparametric statistics.

== Academic biography ==
Levina completed her undergraduate studies in mathematics at Saint Petersburg State University in Russia in 1994. After earning a master's degree in mathematics from the University of Utah in 1997, she completed her PhD in statistics in 2002 from the University of California, Berkeley. Her dissertation, supervised by Peter J. Bickel, was Statistical Issues in Texture Analysis.

Levina joined the faculty of Department of Statistics at University of Michigan after completing her PhD in 2002. She was promoted to associate professor in 2009 and to full professor in 2014. She served as the department's PhD program director from 2012 to 2019 and as department chair from 2020 to 2025. She is also affiliated faculty at the Michigan Institute for Data Science, AI and Society (MIDAS) and the Center for the Study of Complex Systems.

== Recognition ==
Levina received the American Statistical Association Gottfried E. Noether Young Scholar Award in 2010 for her contributions to nonparametric statistics.

She was elected to the International Statistical Institute in 2011. In 2016, she was elected as a Fellow of the American Statistical Association and as a Fellow of the Institute of Mathematical Statistics (IMS).

She was awarded the Vijay Nair Collegiate Professorship in 2017.

She was an invited speaker at the 2018 International Congress of Mathematicians, speaking in the section on Probability and Statistics. She has been chosen as a 2019 Medallion Lecturer for the IMS.

Professor Liza Levina is a “Thomson-ISI highly cited” researcher.

She received University of Michigan Distinguished Faculty Achievement Award in 2019. This honor is awarded university-wide to five senior faculty members annually.

In 2026, she was elected to the National Academy of Sciences.

== Family ==
Levina's husband, Edward Ionides, is also a professor of statistics at the University of Michigan. They have three children.
