= Population Registration Act, 1950 =

Apartheid-era South African law

Parliament of South Africa
- Long title: Act to make provision for the compilation of a Register of the Population of the Union; for the issue of Identity Cards to persons whose names are included in the Register; and for matters incidental thereto.
- Citation: Act No. 30 of 1950
- Enacted by: Parliament of South Africa
- Assented to by: Governor-General Gideon Brand van Zyl
- Royal assent: 22 June 1950
- Commenced: 7 July 1950
- Repealed: 28 June 1991
- Administered by: Minister of the Interior

Repealed by
- Population Registration Act Repeal Act, 1991
- Status: Repealed

The Population Registration Act of 1950 required that each inhabitant of South Africa be classified and registered in accordance with their racial characteristics and culture as part of the system of apartheid. This law worked in tandem with other laws passed as part of the apartheid system. Under the Prohibition of Mixed Marriages Act, 1949, it was illegal for a white person to marry a person of another race. With the enactment of the Immorality Amendment Act, 1950, it also became a crime for a white person and a person of another race to have sexual intercourse or outercourse.

Social rights, political rights, educational opportunities, and economic status were largely determined by the group to which an individual belonged. There were three basic racial classifications under the law: Black, White and Coloured (mixed). Under the act, as amended, Coloureds and Indians were formally classified into various subgroups, including Cape Coloured, Malay, Griqua, Chinese, Indian, Other Asian and Other Coloured. Indians (that is, South Asians from the former British Raj, and their descendants) were later added as a separate classification as they were seen as having "no historical right to the country".

== History ==
=== Early history of race classification ===
In 1910, the Union of South Africa was established with four provinces based on the old colonies of the Cape of Good Hope, Natal and the two Boer republics of the Free State and the Transvaal, with a white parliament. Prior to this Union, each of the four colonies or republics had its own laws on how race was classified when it came to legislation containing race. Most classifications were based on whether one was white or a native, with coloured people linked under the native category. How race was classified, however, differed. In the Transvaal, it was based on appearance and descent, Free State, appearance, descent, general acceptance, repute and living conditions, while in Natal, it offered no criteria expect that it asked whether the native race originated from south of the equator. In Free State, people classified as Indian could not reside there, while Natal and the Transvaal had laws concerning living and working locations and identity documents, while Chinese immigration was banned in the Transvaal after 1906.

With the Union of 1910, its parliament sought to create legislation that applied to the whole country, but legislation enacted that contained segregation-based content, failed to establish a uniform means to define race to the extent that a person could be classified as a different race by different sets of legislation. Essentially, most race-based legislation had either one criterion or all four types of criteria to decide one's race, these being descent, appearance, acceptance and repute, and lastly mode of living. The 1911 Native Labour Regulation Act was one of the first laws that aimed to collect tax from natives (black South Africans), but was soon challenged by the courts as it had failed to exclude coloureds.

The Department of Native Affairs that applied the various forms of legislation did so with no clearly defined way of establishing a person's race, and so applied various sources and personal judgements. It attempted in 1926, via the Secretary for Native Affairs, to clarify who was native versus who was coloured and again in 1946, defining that a native would be determined by what was in each piece of individual legislation. So race classification could be established by the Native Affairs department via a case by case basis based on sources such as appearance, associating with other natives in their environment, language spoken or natural language used, their district of domicile, whether they lived in a location, paid native tax, and if married, was their spouse native and was lobolo paid. Other tests claimed to have been used included the hair test, eyelid test and intimate medical examinations such as genital pigmentation.

Basing race on descent was a troubling idea for white politicians in charge of legislation, best left undiscussed, as there were some in the white population whose ancestors had in the past married others who weren't white.

In 1921, the idea of classifying race in South Africa was proposed by Mine Minister Patrick Duncan. The idea, which proceed no further than that, was to create a national population register and classify the population by race. The idea arose again in 1935 when a parliamentary select committee discussed it, but was soon dismissed as impracticable and costly.

=== After 1948 ===
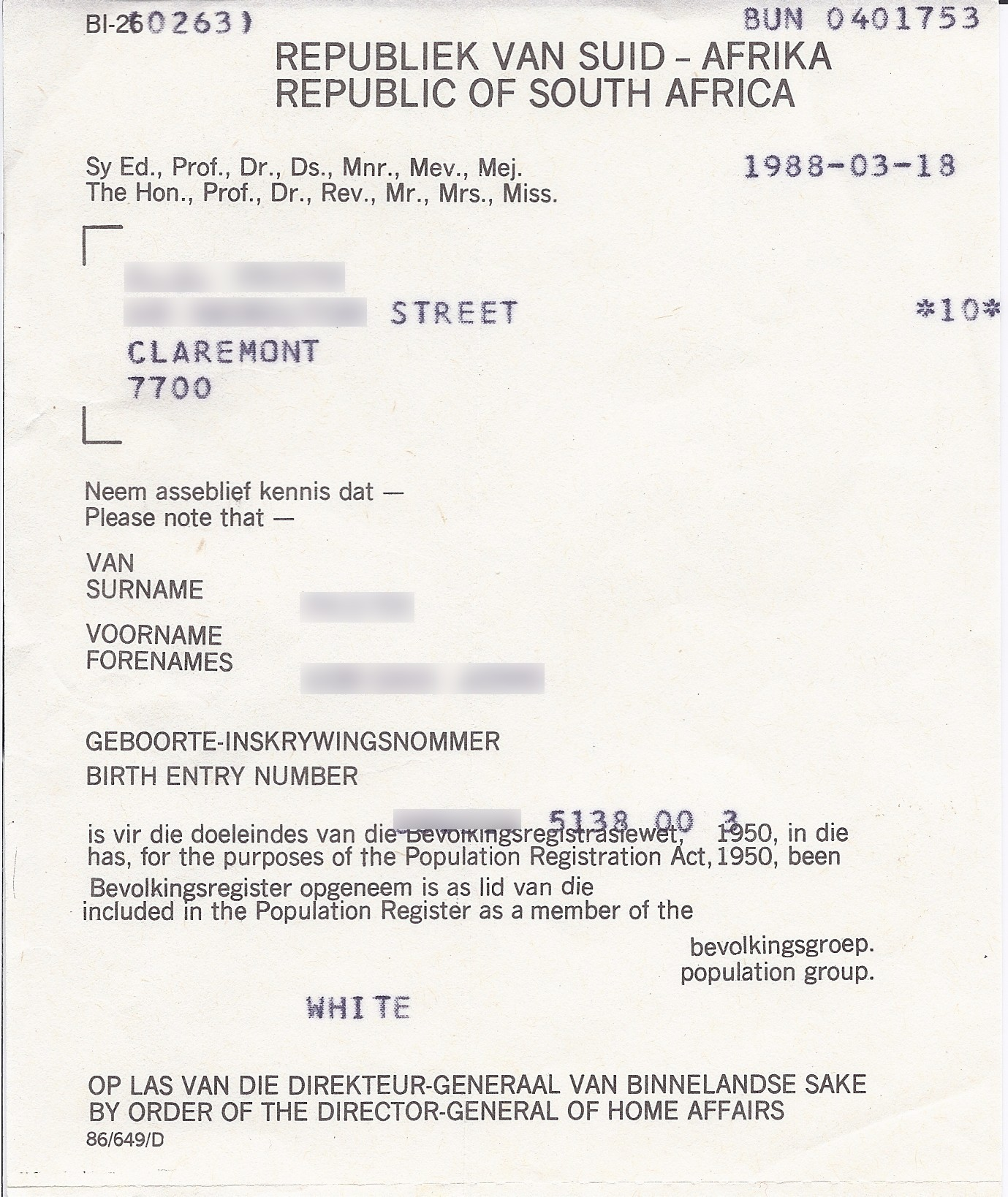
Race classification certificate issued in terms of the Population Registration Act

In November 1948, the first inkling of the future legislation which would be known as the Population Registration Act, was announced by prime minister D. F. Malan at a Transvaal National Party Congress. He announced all South African races would be registered and issued with an identity card, and would supersede all current forms of identification. He made it clear that it would assist in the application of apartheid law, in particular, to identify which areas races could live in and who they could marry. Other areas it could be used, he said, were in identifying non-South Africans (aliens) and assisting in voter registration. One thing he suggested was that anyone with one-sixth black blood, a person's grandparents, would be classified as coloured, something that never made it into the future legislation.

On 20 February 1950, Eben Dönges, Minister of the Interior, introduced the Population Registration Act to the South African parliament. It called for the introduction of a population register to be compiled after a census of the population was conducted in 1951. A registration certificate would be created for all South Africans and non-South Africans, but would exclude those under the age of sixteen and Black women. Identity cards would then be issued after the census data was compiled and would include one's name, address, sex, race, date and place of birth, citizenship, marital status, electoral area, and an identification number. The production of an identification document as requested by a policeman (seven-day grace period) would be required on a date to be set in the future. One's race was to be classified as either European, Native African, or Coloured. Anyone not identifying as white or as a native African was to be classified as coloured.

By 1954, the details of all Black South African men and women were being maintained by the Central Reference Bureau and would be responsible for issuing the identity books Dompas and the collection of fingerprints for those aged older than sixteen.

The Population Registration Amendment Act, No. 71 of 1956, ended the indefinite time period a person had to object to their classification by giving the person disagreeing only 30 days to state their objection in writing to the Director of Census. It also added the presumption, which had previously been stated in the 1950 Act, that those who appearance was obviously white were classified as white, for those people who appear to be of an African race, were assumed to be native African, unless otherwise proved.

In 1959, the South African government addressed the issue of the lack of clarity with the Coloured classification. Proclamation No. 46 of 1959 was issued, which allocated sub-sections to the Coloured classification. A person classified Coloured could choose to be either a Cape Coloured, Cape Malays, Griqua, Chinese, Indian, Other Asiatic (Asians other than Indian, Pakistani, or Chinese), or Other Coloured. This proclamation was overturned in a 1967 ruling of the Cape Town division of the Supreme Court on the grounds it was too vague.

During November 1959, the Minister of the Interior announced that legislation would be introduced to make identity cards compulsory in order to vote in White only elections. The Population Registration Amendment Act, No. 30 of 1960, legislated the transfer of the management of the population register from the Director of Census to the Secretary of the Minister of the Interior. In January 1961, it was announced that the Governor-general would issue a proclamation in September making the possession of identity cards compulsory for whites and coloureds over 16 years of age. Reference books at this time were compulsory for black men over sixteen years of age but not black women. By January 1962, no proclamation had been issued concerning the compulsory production of identity cards when asked for by a policeman, and legislation requiring their use as identification for voting was only introduced that year, but the government had succeeded in issuing 3 million identity cards to the white, coloured, and Asian populations, with around 400,000 identity cards still unissued. On 1 February 1963, it finally became law that when challenged by a policeman, a white, coloured or Asian person had to produce an identity document within seven days or be fined.

The Population Registration Amendment Act, No. 61 of 1962, amended the description of what is a white person, basing it on their perceived appearance and acceptance by white society. It acknowledged the use of census data supplied by the Director of Census, would now to be used by the Interior Ministry, to maintain the population register. It also allowed the Secretary of the Interior the discretion to extend the time period a person or persons had to object to the race classification issued to that person from 30 days to up to a year. It legislated that it was the duty of a person providing information for the population register to prove their information was correct, and legislated the right to delegate duties to other civil servants to investigate and report to the Secretary of the Interior information provided to the population register.

In 1967, the South African government introduced an amendment bill to parliament, the Population Registration Amendment Act 64 of 1967, to further clarify aspects of the Population Registration Act. It had now added one's racial descent to the previous requirements of appearance and public acceptance used to determine a race classification. In race data from the 1951 Census, where a respondent had stated that their race as either white, black, or mixed; those who answered mixed race would be classified as coloured. The amendment also clarified that having two white parents classified you white, having one coloured parent classified you coloured, and having one white parent and the other black classified you as coloured. The state president was legislated with the ability to proclamate the racial sub-sections for coloureds. Proclamation R123 was announced on 26 May 1967 and restored the 1959 sub-sections of types of Coloured classification.

The Population Registration Amendment Act, No. 106 of 1969, legislated a number of changes. It legislated the powers of the Secretary of the Interior to give notice to a person whom they believed had an incorrect race classification, for that person's race classification to be heard before a classification board, and the board to make a final decision. The Secretary could, at his discretion, change the race classification of a person if they requested it. It legislated racial descent, describing having two white parents classified you white, having one coloured parent classified you coloured, and having one white parent and the other black, classified you as a coloured person. It stated that the secretary's discretion to hear race classification arguments, after the certificate had been issued, could not be longer than one year. A minor did not need his guardian's permission to object to their race classification. The classification board's decision concerning a person's race classification, as per the 1950 Act, could be appealed by the person it affected or by the Secretary of the Interior, registered in the Supreme Court within thirty days of the board's decision but now added a maximum time period of two months, to have legal representation, and that the decision of the Supreme Court would be appealed to the Appeals Court, and the court's final decision would regarded as a decision of the classification board. It also stated, that a person, once reaching age sixteen, supplying the required paperwork and two photographs, would be issued an identity card. It also described the penalty for failing to register for an identity card when turning sixteen.

The Population Registration Amendment Act, 1970, amended section 13 of the Act, denying an identity card to black South Africans who had been issued with a certificate of citizenship for a black homeland, based on their ethic tribal group, in terms of the Bantu Homelands Citizenship Act, 1970, with the objective of stripping them of South African citizenship. Transkei, Bophutatswana, Venda and Ciskei started to maintain their own population register to record identity, births, marriages and deaths.

On 5 May 1972, Proclamation R114 was issued, removing Black South Africans from the population register with their particulars now maintained by the Reference Bureau. The reference book became an identity book and an indication of their citizenship in a black homeland.

Minor amendments were made to the Population Registration Act, 1950, when it was amended by the Population Registration and Identity Documents Amendment Act, 1973, which replaced the identity card and introduced an identity book, more commonly known as the Book of Life.

By late 1977, Prime Minister Vorster announced that black citizens of Lebowa, Ciskei, and Bophutatswana would receive similar Book of Life as South African whites had, and work permits would be required to enter "South Africa" creating a bureaucratic nightmare and scramble to set up new population registers and border posts.

The 1982 amendment to the Act saw changes to the common definitions in the Act, with the main change being the definition of what was considered as your ordinary place of residence and the appointment of regional representees of the director-general of Home Affairs (new name of the Department of the Interior) and the department. It also added new information to be included in the population register, such as where a person's voting district was when reaching age sixteen, their occupation, and passports and leave permits. The new amendment had rewritten a section concerning the rules about the notification of the change to a person's residence and postal address. It also added the need for a signature in the identity document and added new electoral areas brought about by the changes of a tricameral parliament.

The Population Registration and Elections Amendment Act of 1984, clarified the definition of what was considered as your ordinary place of residence for students, trainee policemen and prison officers, and members of parliament. It also added new information to be included in the identity document which would include all the previous married surnames of women. It also added the requirements to surrender or to seize identity documents of deceased persons. It also added the offences and penalties relating to the population register and identity documents.

In 1986, Identification Act, No. 72 of 1986, was introduced, which gutted the Population Registration Act of 1950, as amended over the years, of most of its sections, and so the Identification Act became the main legislation for allocating one's race and identity documents. On 25 June 1986, the passbook for urban Black South Africans, which was a requirement from age sixteen, was scrapped and replaced with a uniform identity document carried by all the citizens of the Republic of South Africa, the exception being citizens of the homeland states.

By 1990, there were a dozen or more population registers, starting with the national South African population register itself and the homeland states' versions which overlapped with the formers or were duplicated. In February 1991, the national population register was deracialised, but the incorporation of the data from the homeland's population registers was not inserted into the former until 1994. In order to fix the database mess generated by the numerous population registers, the national cabinet decided in 1996 to repair the population register and issue new identity documents by introducing the Home Affairs National Identification System (HANIS). The new plan for the identity document project had three parts: the creation of an automated fingerprint system, the integration of the system into the current population register, and establishing a card-issuing facility.

== Impact of racial classification on certain population groups ==
=== Indian descent ===
Traditionally, those identifying as Indian were not regarded as residents of the country and successive South African colonies and governments sought to have them returned to India. The Natal Colony had brought in indentured Indians from India since 1860, and in 1870s, free Indian migrants. By 1893, the Natal government had passed laws to reduce immigration, increase taxation to force them to return to India, specify residential and trading areas, and ensured no voting rights. In the Orange Free State, Indians were banned from 1891, and in the Transvaal Republic, introduced separate trade and residential areas in 1885. In 1950, the government, run by the National Party, did not want Indian South Africans to be integrated into the country or even become citizens. Essentially, Indians were regarded as immigrants while whites were colonists. In 1932, 80% of the Indian population were born in South Africa; by 1960, it was as high as 90%. The Indian government supported black independence in Africa and opposed the creation of Apartheid legislation and expected Indians in South Africa to support the black population's struggle to end segregation without achieving special dispensation for their own race. The government interacted with the Indian government to send them home, but this failed. In 1961, on South Africa becoming a republic, South African Indians were granted permanent residence with a Department of Indian Affairs created in August that year, and an advisory National Indian Council formed in 1964 of government-appointed nominees.

=== Chinese descent ===
The origins of people of Chinese descent in South Africa begins with immigration from the 1870's from Guangdong province, who spoke Cantonese or Hakka and numbered between 2000 and 3000 persons. The next wave was in the Transvaal when 60,000 Chinese were brought in for gold mining from 1904 to 1906 and were mostly repatriated by 1910. The last wave prior to the end of Apartheid was during the 1980s, which was by Taiwanese immigrants who set up businesses in the black homelands.

People classified as Chinese created a headache for the Apartheid planners. The Chinese population was too small to create a separate group area to move and resettle the population. In May 1962, a loophole in the Population Register Act had to be closed by means of a proclamation, when a Chinese man, David Song, successfully contested his Asiatic classification based on his association with white people and his acceptance by them, which assisted him being reclassified as white.

By 1971, the Department of Community Development started to issue permits that allowed Chinese people to buy property and settle to in areas classified as white only subject to all in their neighbors' being in agreement. By 1983, a commission studying the Group Areas Act recommended that Chinese people be given the same rights as whites in relation to property ownership, but made no changes to other apartheid laws they were impacted by, such as the mixed marriages act. The recommendations were enacted in May 1985 by amendments to the laws.

=== Japanese descent ===
The Japanese in South Africa were granted exemptions and classified as honorary Whites based on two main reasons. The South African government justified it on the basis that the population of those classified as Japanese was extremely small and should be regarded as temporary residents and therefore honorary whites. In 1961, there were only 50 Japanese in South Africa, and this rose to 600 in 1974. The second reason was that Japanese trade was important for South African raw material exports. The Japanese population in South Africa were therefore exempted from apartheid acts such as the Group Areas Act.

=== Other Asiatics ===
Zanzibaris were freed slaves of black Muslim origin from Zanzibar and brought to Natal, South Africa, by the British authorities in late the 1870s to prevent them from being re-enslaved. Initially they were indentured servants, then released after five years and by legislation, were regarded like other Indians in Natal. With the 1950's and the introduction of the Population Registration Act, the Zanzibaris would be initially classified as Native (Black) and then by the late 1950's, as Coloured, then later with the expansion of the Coloured classification, as Other Asiatics. Group Areas Act eventually settled them in Chatsworth.

== Identity documents ==
=== Identity card (1953-1972) ===
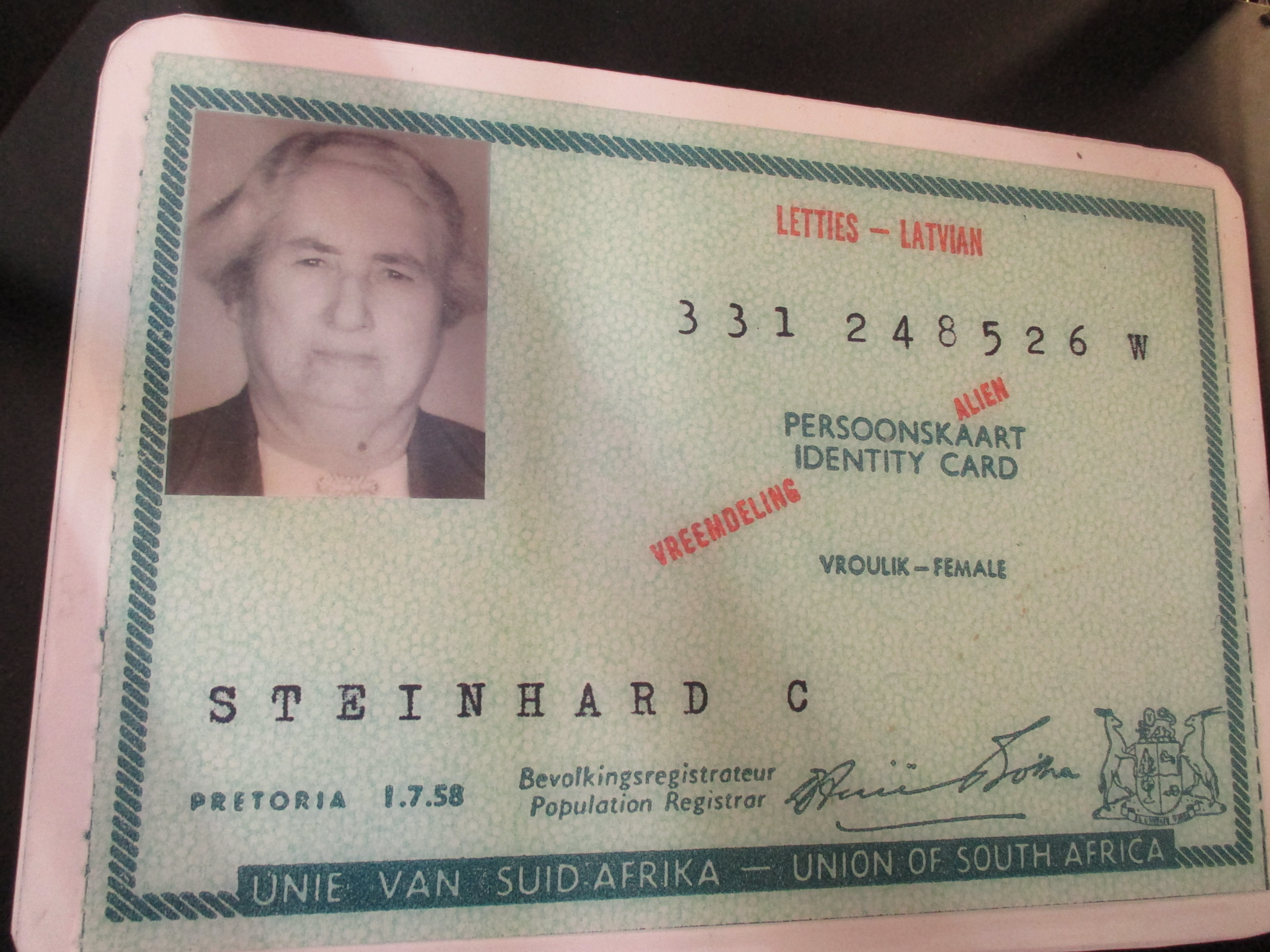
Example of the Identity Card from 1959

As envisioned in 1950, the South African identification card was to be a laminated wallet sized card issued to all South Africans and permanent residents, while those classed as black had their cards glued to their reference books. It had a photograph that had been supplied by the card owner and contained details that the owner had supplied during the 1951 Census and used to populate the identification card. The card contained their name, surname, address, identity number and race classification. The number was made up of the first two numbers of their birth year, followed by their census district number, a birth registration number for that district, and lastly a letter indicating their race. By the 1960s, that race letter was highlighted in red. The cards header for whites, coloureds, and Asians was "SA Burger - SA Citizen" while the reference cards header for Blacks stated it as "Bevolkingsregister - Naturelle : Population Register - Natives".

=== Book of Life (1972 onwards) ===
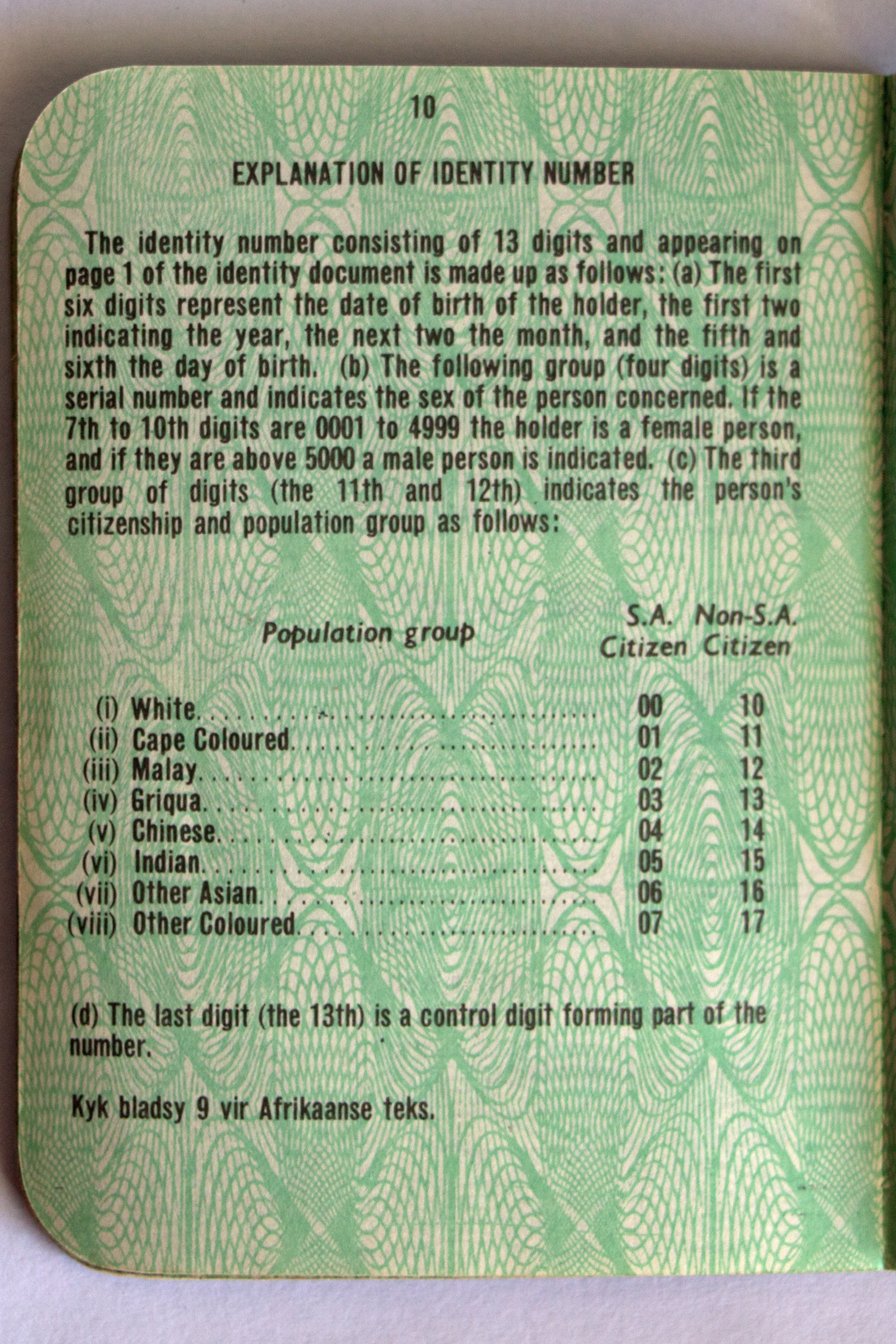
Explanation of South African identity numbers in an identity document during apartheid in terms of official White, Coloured and Indian population subgroups

From 1966 onwards, the Book of Life project was revived by the Department of the Interior, building on the original 1950 idea that the population register would contain a record of everything that occurred during a person's life.

A dissenting voice against the introduction of the new identity document project was the director of the Census. He reminded the politicians that the object of the population register was to make and preserve Apartheid by identifying a person's race, and that identification was a secondary goal of the initial project. He also warned about the issues and costs of computing, and that the administrative issues involved in maintaining the current register would continue with the new project and its centralisation goals. The first part was to move the project to a new building, as the population register had been maintained in a temporary building at the Census Bureau.

Being an ambitious project, the population register would now hold the details of an individual's marriage certificate, gun and drivers licences, stripping that collection and storage from magistrates and municipal offices. This was in addition to maintaining the collection of births, deaths, and residential addresses for voting districts.

By 1971, a new dedicated building had been built in Pretoria called the Civitas to maintain the register, properly staffed and a new IBM mainframe, with regional offices based around the country. The mainframe was installed in May 1971, and the build was only fully completed in 1973.

Applications for the new Book of Life began in February 1972. Unable to cope with the applications, the department restricted the latter to people turning sixteen years old and to certain magisterial districts. But the department was not able to keep up with the workload, and by 1978 it had only converted half the population over to the new identity document, with some applications taking two years. This brought additional issues, as identity books had not been issued to the whole white population, they could not be used for voter identification and registration at elections at that time. In addition the date to have drivers licences in the Book of Life was continually extended to the point at which the drivers licenses were being pasted into the identity book as slips of paper defeating the objective of a secure centrally managed system. And lastly, most of the sixty pages of the identity book remained unused due to implementation delays and confusion by bureaucrats as to what exactly was to be included in the book.

== Amendments ==
The original act was amended many times as it attempted to close loopholes and reduced the number of departmental decisions that were challenged in the courts:

- Population Registration Amendment Act, Act No. 71 of 1956
- Population Registration Amendment Act, Act No. 30 of 1960
- Population Registration Amendment Act, Act No. 61 of 1962
- Population Registration Amendment Act, Act No. 64 of 1967
- Population Registration Amendment Act, Act No. 106 of 1969
- Population Registration Amendment Act, 1970
- Population Registration and Identity Documents Amendment Act, 1973
- Population Registration and Identity Documents in South West Africa Amendment Act, 1977
- Population Registration Amendment Act, 1977
- Population Registration Amendment Act; 1980
- Population Registration Amendment Act, Act No. 101 of 1982
- Population Registration and Elections Amendment Act, Act No. 103 of 1984
- Identification Act, Act No. 72 of 1986

== Repealed ==
The South African Parliament repealed the act on 17 June 1991. Voting on the repeal act, 178 members of the white parliament cast their vote which resulted in 38 voting against while 11 abstained, with all the votes against coming from the Conservative Party. In order to maintain the current system of parliament, a tricameral system based on race, the government implemented measures to continue it until a new constitutional changes could negotiated and enacted. President F.W. de Klerk denied the critics that racism was still enshrined stating, "The Government is unqualified in its commitment to the removal of racial discrimination from every law and act of Government. Nothing in the repealing legislation is in conflict with this commitment." One of the consequences of the repeal of the act was that President George H. W. Bush lifted sanctions in July 1991 that were imposed when the Comprehensive Anti-Apartheid Act was enacted in 1986.

However, the racial categories defined in the Apartheid act remain ingrained in South African culture and they still form the basis of some official policies and statistics aimed at redressing past economic imbalances (Black Economic Empowerment and Employment Equity). The Employment Equity Act (Act 55 of 1998) introduced affirmative action into employment in the country with the emphasis on black, coloured and Indian people as target for this classification.

== Application of the legislation ==
An Office for Race Classification was set up to overview the classification process. Classification into groups was carried out using criteria such as outer appearance, general acceptance and social standing. For example, it defined a "white person" as one who "in appearance is obviously a white person who is generally not accepted as a coloured person, or is generally accepted as a white person and is not in appearance obviously a white person." Because some aspects of the profile were of a social nature, reclassification was not uncommon, and a board was established to conduct that process. The following criteria were used for separating the coloured people from the white people:

- Characteristics of the person's head hair
- Characteristics of the person's other hair
- Skin colour
- Facial features
- Home language and especially the knowledge of Afrikaans
- Area where the person lives, the person's friends and acquaintances
- Employment
- Socioeconomic status
- Eating and drinking habits

=== Examples of the law's consequences ===
- Coloured man employed his daughter, classified black, as his maid so she could live with him;
- Coloured woman lost her foster child as he had been reclassified black;
- Coloured man with three daughters classified white and fourth coloured.
- 1967, Dickson family's two children, classified white, expelled from a primary school in Plettenburg Bay after 42 sets of parents out of 45 complained to authorities they weren't white, whole family was reclassified coloured;
- 1973, black child of black parents, expelled from a black school as her skin and hair was too light, but unable to attend a coloured school as she only spoke Sotho;

=== Some examples of reclassification statistics ===
- 1972 - 26 coloureds to white, 7 whites to coloured, 8 Indians to Malay, 3 Malay to Indian, 2 Coloureds to Indian, 11 Indians to other coloureds, 2 Indians to Cape Coloured, 1 other coloured to Chinese;
- 1982 - 1,189 applied for reclassification with 997 positive decisions, with some examples include 1 Indian to White, 1 White to Indian, 772 Cape Coloured to White, 3 Whites to Cape Coloured etc;

== See also ==
- Demographics of South Africa
- Pencil test
- Urban apartheid
