= Liangjun Su =

Chinese econometrician

- 苏良军

Academic background
- Education: Xi'an Jiaotong University; Tongji University; University of California, Riverside; University of California, San Diego (PhD)
- Doctoral advisor: Halbert White

Academic work
- Discipline: Econometrics
- Institutions: Tsinghua University; Singapore Management University; Peking University
- Awards: Lee Kong Chian Professorship (2016–2020)

Liangjun Su is a Chinese econometrician.

Su earned a Bachelor of Engineering in engineering economics at Xi'an Jiaotong University in 1994 and pursued a Master of Engineering in the same field at Tongji University until 1997. He moved to the United States to earned a second master's degree, a Master of Arts in economics at the University of California, Riverside in 1999, followed by a PhD in economics at the University of California, San Diego in 2004. Upon graduation, Su returned to China for an assistant professorship at Peking University's Guanghua School of Management. He was promoted to an associate professorship in 2007, and left for the Singapore Management University the following year. At SMU, Su was named a full professor in 2012 and held the Lee Kong Chian Professorship of Economics from 2016 to 2020. From 2020, Su has taught at Tsinghua University's School of Economics and Management as the C.V. Starr Chair Professor of Economics.

In 2025, Su was named an editor-in-chief of the journal Econometric Theory, alongside Patrik Guggenberger and Yixiao Sun.
