= Rex Bergstrom =

New Zealand econometrician

Albert Rex Bergstrom (9 July 1925 – 1 May 2005) was a New Zealand econometrician recognised for his work in continuous time econometrics.

== Biography ==
Bergstrom was born on 9 July 1925 in Christchurch where he attended Christchurch Boys' High School. He studied at Canterbury University College part-time from 1942 to 1947 while working in accountancy and serving in the Royal New Zealand Air Force. He gained a first-class honours degree in 1948 and subsequently won a travelling scholarship in commerce which he took up in 1952 to do his doctoral work at the University of Cambridge, completing his PhD in 1955. He taught at Massey College, the University of Auckland, the London School of Economics, and finally the University of Essex where he became the Keynes Visiting Professor. He died on 1 May 2005.

== Festschrift ==
In May 1992, in occasion of his 65th birthday, a Festschrift was dedicated to Bergstrom under the title Models, Methods, and Applications of Econometrics, which contains various essays authored by some of Bergstrom's former students and colleagues. It was edited by his former student, Peter C.B. Phillips.

== General references ==
- Peter CB Philips's Obituary of Bergstrom pdf
