= Donald Andrews =

Canadian economist (born 1955)

Donald W. K. Andrews
- Born: 1955 (age 70–71); Vancouver, British Columbia

Academic background
- Education: University of California, Berkeley; University of British Columbia
- Doctoral advisor: Thomas J. Rothenberg; Peter J. Bickel

Academic work
- Discipline: Econometrics
- Institutions: Yale University
- Website: Information at IDEAS / RePEc

Donald Wilfrid Kao Andrews (born 1955) is a Canadian economist. He is the Tjalling Koopmans Professor of Economics at the Cowles Foundation, Yale University. Born in Vancouver, he received his B.A. in economics in 1977 at the University of British Columbia, his M.A. in 1980 in statistics at the University of California, Berkeley, and his Ph.D. in economics in 1982 also from the University of California, Berkeley.

His specialty is in econometrics and has published a large part of his work in the journal Econometrica. He is also affiliated with the Yale Department of Statistics.

== Honors ==
- Distinguished Fellow of the American Economic Association, 2026.
- Fellow of the American Academy of Arts and Sciences, 2006.
- Fellow of the Econometric Society, 1989.
- 1992 Paper, Joint with E. Zivot, Published in the Commemorative Issue of the Most Influential Papers Published in the Journal of Business and Economic Statistics, 2001.
- Best Teacher of the Year, Department of Economics, Yale University, 1996, 2000, and 2006.
- Best Advisor of the Year, Department of Economics, Yale University, 2007.

He is associate editor, Econometrica, 1988–present, and foreign editor, Review of Economic Studies, 2005–present. He was co-editor, Econometric Theory, 1991–2003.

He has served on the Economics Advisory Panel, National Science Foundation, 1992–1994, and been the recipient on 10 successive multi-year grants from that organisation from 1985 to the present.

He is a member of the American Economic Association, American Statistical Association, Econometric Society, and Institute of Mathematical Statistics.

== Publications ==
He has published over 70 peer-reviewed papers in Economics and econometric journals. Among his major works are:

- Andrews, Donald W. K. & Lee, Inpyo & Ploberger, Werner, "Optimal Changepoint Tests for Normal Linear Regression" Journal of Econometrics, 70:1 (1996), pages 9–38, Available from RePEc (cited 28 times in RePEc)
- Andrews, Donald W. K. & Ploberger, Werner, "Optimal Tests When a Nuisance Parameter Is Present Only Under the Alternative". Econometrica, 62(6), 1994.

He is also co-editor of the book,

- Identification and Inference for Econometric Models: A Festschrift in Honor of Thomas J. Rothenberg co-edited with James H. Stock. Cambridge, UK: Cambridge University Press, 2005.

=== His most recent publications ===
- Andrews, Donald W. K. & Guggenberger, Patrik, " A Conditional-Heteroskedasticity-Robust Confidence Interval for the Autoregressive Parameter", Review of Economics and Statistics, 96(2): 376-381, May 2014.
- Andrews, Donald W. K. & Cheng, Xu, "GMM Estimation and Uniform Subvector Inference with Possible Identification Failure", Econometric Theory, 20(2): 287-333, April 2014.
- Andrews, Donald W. K., "Nonparametric Inference Based on Conditional Moment Inequalities", Journal of Econometrics, 179(1): 31-45, March 2014.
