= Katerina Kechris =

American statistician, professor of biostatistics

Katerina Joanna Kechris
- Education: University of California, Los Angeles (B.S.); University of California, Berkeley (M.A., Ph.D.)
- Scientific career
- Workplaces: Colorado School of Public Health
- Thesis: Statistical Methods for Discovering Features in Molecular Sequences (2003)

Katerina Joanna Kechris is an American statistician, a professor of biostatistics and informatics in the Colorado School of Public Health. Her research focuses on the use of omics data to study relations between genetics and disease.

== Education ==
Kechris graduated from the University of California, Los Angeles in 1997, and completed a Ph.D. in statistics at the University of California, Berkeley in 2003. Her dissertation, supervised by Peter J. Bickel, was Statistical Methods for Discovering Features in Molecular Sequences. Before joining the Colorado School of Public Health, she did postdoctoral research with Hao Li at the University of California, San Francisco.

== Recognition ==
Kechris was elected regional president for the Western North American Region of the International Biometric Society for 2019. She was selected to become a Fellow of the American Statistical Association in 2019, "for contributions to high-dimensional biological data analysis, team science and training and mentoring of students". She served as Section Chair for the ASA Section on Statistics and Genomics and Genetics in 2021.
