= Steven Durlauf =

American economist

Steven Neil Durlauf
- Born: Encino, California
- Education: Harvard University (BA); Yale University (PhD)
- Scientific career
- Fields: Economics, Public Policy
- Workplaces: University of Chicago University of Wisconsin
- Thesis: (1986)
- Doctoral advisor: Peter C. B. Phillips

Steven Neil Durlauf is an American economist and social scientist. He is currently Frank P. Hixon Distinguished Service Professor and the inaugural Director of the Stone Center for Research on Wealth Inequality and Mobility at the Harris School of Public Policy Studies at the University of Chicago. Durlauf was previously the William F. Vilas Research Professor and Kenneth J. Arrow Professor of Economics at the University of Wisconsin-Madison. As of 2021, is also a Part Time Professor at the New Economic School.

Durlauf's research spans many topics in microeconomics and macroeconomics. His most important substantive contributions involve the areas of poverty, inequality and economic growth. Much of his research has attempted to integrate sociological ideas into economic analysis. His major methodological contributions include both economic theory and econometrics. He helped pioneer the application of statistical mechanics techniques to the modelling of socioeconomic behavior and has also developed identification analyses for the empirical analogs of these models. Other research has focused on the development of techniques for policy evaluation and the construction of an econometrics of cross country income differences. Durlauf is also known as a critic of the use of the concept of social capital by social scientists and has also challenged the ways that agent-based modelling and complexity theory have been employed by social and natural scientists to study socioeconomic phenomena. Finally, Durlauf has written on issues of fairness and justice, developing normative justifications for "associational redistribution" which refers to the idea that policies such as affirmative action should be understood as redistributing various social and economic ties.

== Education ==
Durlauf received his B.A. in economics from Harvard University in 1980, and his Ph.D. in economics from Yale University in 1986.

== Honors, awards and positions ==
Durlauf was elected a Fellow of the American Academy of Arts and Sciences in 2011. He is also a Fellow of the Econometric Society, the Society for Economic Measurement, the Society for the Advancement of Economic Theory and the International Association for Applied Econometrics. He is a research associate at the National Bureau of Economic Research.

From 2010 to 2022, Durlauf was a co-director of the Human Capital and Economic Opportunity Global Working group. Durlauf was Editor of the Journal of Economic Literature from 2013 to 2022. He previously served as General Editor of the New Palgrave Dictionary of Economics. In late 2022, he was selected as the inaugural director of the Stone Center for Research on Wealth Inequality and Mobility. This research center is housed in the University of Chicago's Harris School of Public Policy and is a member of a network of research institutions funded by the James M. and Cathleen D. Stone Foundation. The center pursues interdisciplinary research on the nature of wealth inequality and barriers to mobility with a particular interest in intergenerational mobility.
