= Haiyan Huang =

Chinese-American biostatistician

Haiyan Huang is a Chinese-American biostatistician. She works as a professor of statistics at the University of California, Berkeley, where she directs the Center for Computational Biology. She is the coauthor of highly cited work on the human genome, published as part of the ENCODE research consortium, and has also published foundational work on the statistical modeling of experimental reproducibility.

== Education and career ==
Huang graduated from Peking University in 1997, with a bachelor's degree in mathematics, and earned her Ph.D. in applied mathematics at the University of Southern California in 2001. Her dissertation, Bounds for the Errors in Word Count Distributional Approximations, was supervised by Larry Goldstein. After postdoctoral research with Wing Hung Wong and Jun S. Liu at Harvard University, she joined the Berkeley statistics department in 2003.

== Recognition ==
She was named to the 2022 class of Fellows of the Institute of Mathematical Statistics, for "outstanding research in applied statistics, computational biology and applied probability and major contributions to institutional establishment of computational biology within data science". In 2022 she was also named as a Fellow of the American Statistical Association.
