= Population Registration Act Repeal Act, 1991 =

South African legislation

Parliament of South Africa
- Long title: Act to repeal the Population Registration Act, 1950; to amend or repeal certain laws so as to abolish the distinction made therein between persons belonging to different races or population groups; and to provide for matters connected therewith.
- Citation: Act No. 114 of 1991
- Enacted by: Parliament of South Africa
- Assented to by: President F. W. de Klerk
- Assented to: 27 June 1991
- Commenced: 28 June 1991

Repeals
- Population Registration Act, 1950; Population Registration Amendment Act, 1956; Black Transport Services Act, 1957; Population Registration Amendment Act, 1960; Population Registration Amendment Act, 1962; General Law Amendment Act, 1964 sec.45 Population Registration Amendment Act, 1967; Population Registration Amendment Act, 1969; Population Registration Amendment Act, 1970; Transport Services for Coloured Persons and Indians Act, 1972; Population Registration and Identity Documents Amendment Act, 1973; Population Registration and Identity Documents in South West Africa Amendment Act, 1977 sec.1&2 Population Registration Amendment Act, 1980; Population Registration Amendment Act, 1982; Electoral Amendment Act, 1984; Population Registration and Elections Amendment Act, 1984 sec.1 and 7
- Status: Spent

The Population Registration Act Repeal Act, 1991 (Act No. 114 of 1991) is an act of the Parliament of South Africa which repealed the Population Registration Act, 1950, ending the legal racial classification of South Africans which formed the basis of apartheid.

== Background ==
State President F. W. de Klerk announced his government's intention to repeal the Population Registration Act in his speech at the opening of Parliament on 1 February 1991. The bill was passed by the Tricameral Parliament on 17 June. The House of Assembly (representing white voters) passed it on a vote of 89 to 38, with the Conservative Party voting against. The House of Representatives and House of Delegates (representing Coloured and Indian voters respectively) passed it unanimously. The act was signed by De Klerk on 27 June and came into effect on the following day.

As a result of the Repeal Act, newborns and immigrants no longer had their race registered after June 1991. However, a transitional provision in the act meant that the existing population register, including racial classifications, was retained until the repeal of the 1983 Constitution. According to the government this was necessary because voting rights under the 1983 Constitution depended on the racial classification of the voter. The African National Congress asserted that the government was using this loophole to retain other apartheid practises, such as discriminatory state pension amounts and segregation in schools.

The transitional provision of the Repeal Act ended when the 1983 Constitution was repealed on 27 April 1994 by the Interim Constitution. At this point, the Repeal Act became a spent enactment. In 2015 it was proposed for repeal by the South African Law Reform Commission in its review of legislation administered by the Department of Home Affairs.

== Content of the Act ==
The following is a brief description of the sections of the Population Registration Act Repeal Act:

=== Definitions and interpretation ===
Section 1

Defines in Schedule 1, the Acts repealed by this Act. Defines in Schedule 2, the amendments to numerous Acts. And lastly defines that the existing population register as compiled in terms of the Identification Act, 1986, remains valid until the Constitution changes.

Section 2

Defines the name of the Act.
