= Peter J. Bickel =

Romanian-born American statistician

Peter John Bickel
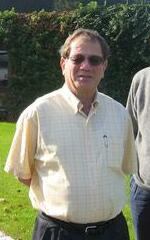
- Born: 1940 (age 85–86); Bucharest, Romania
- Education: University of California, Berkeley (PhD)
- Awards: MacArthur Fellow (1984); COPSS Presidents' Award (1981)
- Scientific career
- Fields: Statistics
- Workplaces: University of California, Berkeley
- Thesis: Asymptotically Nonparametric Statistical Inference in the Multivariate Cases
- Doctoral advisor: Erich Leo Lehmann
- Doctoral students: Donald Andrews; Jianqing Fan; Katerina Kechris; Elizaveta Levina; C. F. Jeff Wu; Jingyi Jessica Li
- Other notable students: Donald Andrews; Mark van der Laan

Peter John Bickel (born 1940) is an American statistician and Professor of Statistics at the University of California, Berkeley. Bickel has made contributions to bootstrapping, robust statistics, machine learning, and other areas of statistics.

== Education and career ==
Bickel studied physics at the California Institute of Technology. He graduated from University of California, Berkeley, with a Ph.D., in 1963, where he studied under Erich Leo Lehmann.

His students include C.F. Jeff Wu, Jianqing Fan, Katerina Kechris, Elizaveta Levina, Jingyi Jessica Li, and Donald Andrews.

== Personal ==
He married Nancy Kramer in 1964; they have two children.

== Awards ==
- 1970 Guggenheim Fellow
- 1973 Fellow of the American Statistical Association
- 1981 the recipient of COPSS Presidents' Award
- 1984 MacArthur Fellow
- 1986 Fellow of the American Academy of Arts and Sciences
- 1986 Member of the National Academy of Sciences
- 1986 Honorary Doctorate degree from Hebrew University, Jerusalem
- 1995 Foreign member of the Royal Netherlands Academy of Arts and Sciences
- 2006 Commander of the Order of Orange-Nassau
- 2013 R. A. Fisher Lectureship
- 2014 Honorary Doctorate degree from ETH Zurich
