= Brown paper bag test =

20th-century racial discrimination practice in Black oral history

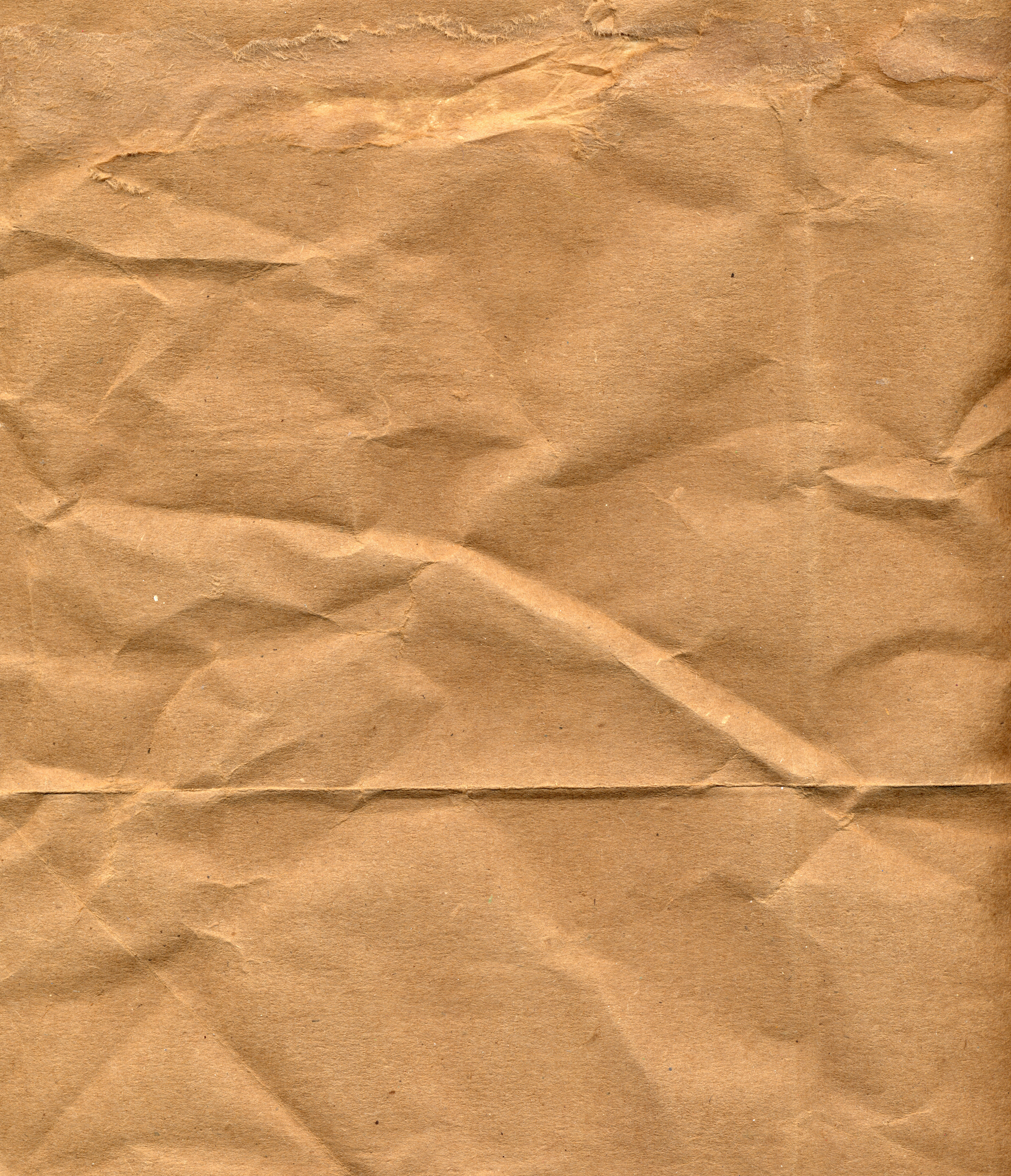
An individual darker than a brown paper bag was denied privileges.

In the United States, the "brown paper bag test" is a term in Black oral history used to describe a colorist discriminatory practice within the Black community in the 20th century, in which an individual's skin tone is compared to the color of a brown paper bag. The test was used to determine what privileges an individual could have; only those with a skin color that matched or was lighter than a brown paper bag were allowed admission or membership privileges. The test was believed by many to be used in the 20th century by many Black-American social institutions such as sororities, fraternities, and social clubs despite limited evidence to support the accusation.

The term is also used in reference to larger issues of class and social stratification and colorism within the Black population. People were barred from having access to several public spaces and resources because of their darker complexion.

== Color discrimination ==
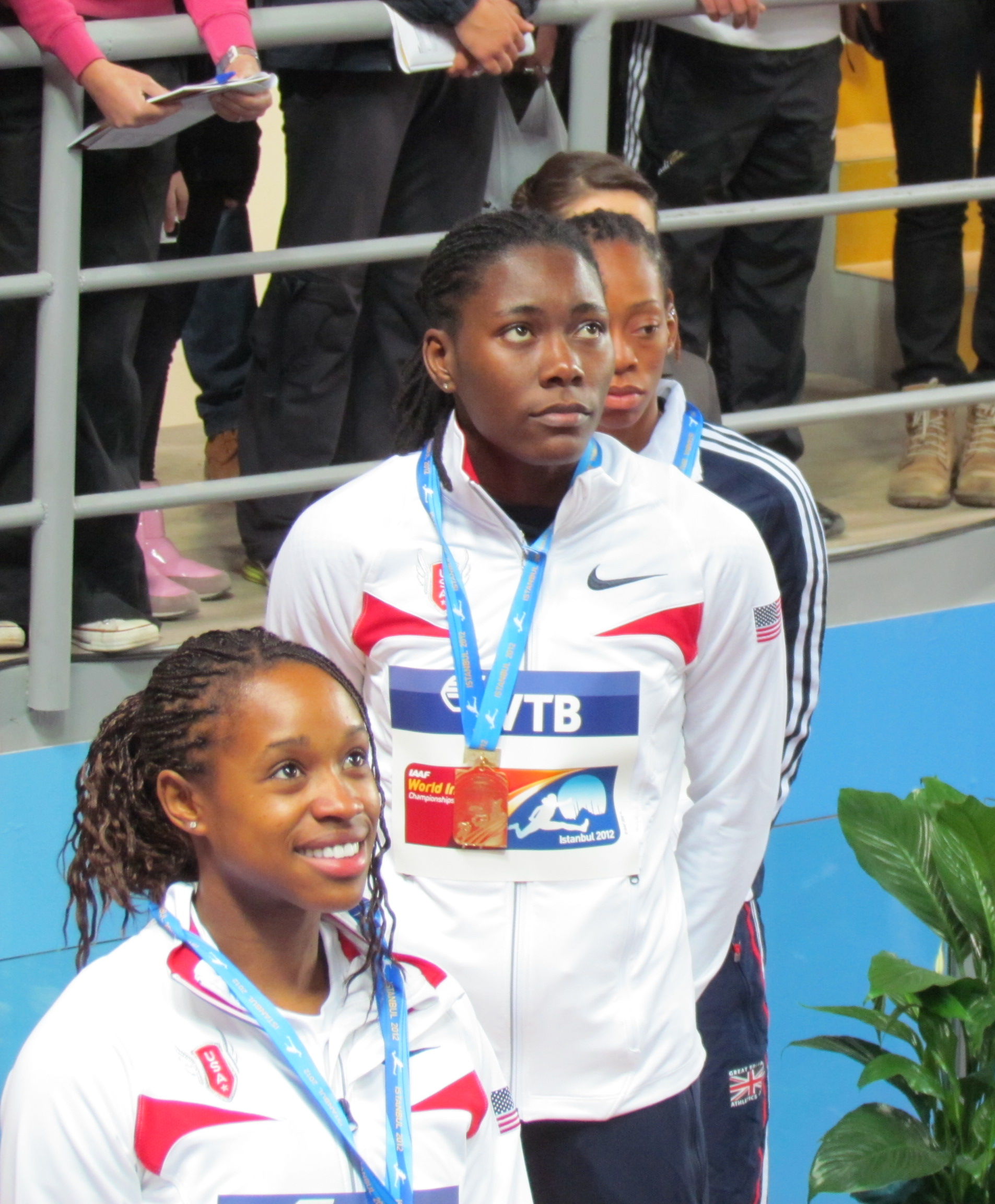
Black athletes with various skin tones

Privilege has long been associated with skin tone in the African-American community, dating back to the era of slavery. Mixed-race children of European American fathers were sometimes given privileges ranging from more desirable work, apprenticeships or formal education, to allocation of property or even freedom from enslavement. African Americans "contributed to colorism because they have benefited from the privilege of having a skin color closer to that of European Americans and have embraced the notion that privilege comes with having light skin in America". Lighter-skinned people were afforded certain social and economic advantages over darker-skinned people, even while suffering discrimination. According to Gordon, "light-skinned blacks formed exclusive clubs" after African slavery was abolished in the United States. Some clubs were called "Blue Vein Societies", suggesting that if an individual's skin was light enough to show the blue cast of veins, they had more European ancestry (and, therefore, higher social standing). Such discrimination was resented by African Americans with darker complexions. According to Henry Louis Gates Jr., in his book The Future of the Race (1996), the practice of the brown paper bag test may have originated in New Orleans, Louisiana, where there was a substantial third class of free people of color dating from the French colonial era. The test was related to ideas of beauty, in which some people believed that lighter skin and more European features, in general, were more attractive.

From 1900 until about 1950, "paper bag parties" are said to have taken place in neighborhoods of major American cities with a high concentration of African Americans. Many churches, fraternities, and nightclubs used the "brown paper bag" principle as a test for entrance. People at these organizations would take a brown paper bag and hold it against a person's skin. If a person was lighter than the bag, they were admitted.

There is, too, a curious color dynamic that persists in our culture. In fact, New Orleans invented the brown paper bag party — usually at a gathering in a home — where anyone darker than the bag attached to the door was denied entrance. The brown bag criterion survives as a metaphor for how the black cultural elite quite literally establishes caste along color lines within black life. On my many trips to New Orleans, whether to lecture at one of its universities or colleges, to preach from one of its pulpits, or to speak at an empowerment seminar during the annual Essence Music Festival, I have observed color politics at work among black folk. The cruel color code has to be defeated by our love for one another. —Michael Eric Dyson, excerpt from Come Hell or High Water.

The brown paper bag test was heavily documented and normalized within historically black fraternities and sororities and some historically black social clubs founded before 1960, whose members selected others who resembled themselves, generally those reflecting partial European ancestry. Some privileged multi-racial people of color who came from families freed before the American Civil War attempted to distinguish themselves from the mass of freedmen after the war, who appeared to be mostly of African descent and from less privileged families. New York City's infamous Cotton Club required black female entertainers to pass the brown paper bag test to be hired and perform for its mostly wealthy white male clientele.

It is believed some private historically black colleges and universities (HBCUs) used color tests as a way to critique candidates for admission. For instance, private colleges such as Howard and Spelman once required applicants to send personal photos, which may have been used to choose applicants with a lighter skin tone. The preference for lighter complexions faded after the 1960s.

== See also ==
- Black is beautiful
- Good hair (phrase)
- High yellow
- Louisiana Creole people
- Mulatto
- One-drop rule
- Passing (racial identity)
- Pencil test (South Africa)
- Quadroon
- School Daze
