= Peter Phillips (economist) =

British econometrician (born 1948)

Peter C. B. Phillips
- Born: 23 March 1948 (age 78); Weymouth, England

Academic background
- Education: University of Auckland (BA, MA); London School of Economics (PhD)
- Doctoral advisor: Denis Sargan; Rex Bergstrom

Academic work
- Discipline: Econometrics
- Institutions: Yale University; University of Auckland; Singapore Management University; University of Southampton
- Doctoral students: Steven Durlauf
- Website: Information at IDEAS / RePEc

Peter Charles Bonest Phillips (born 23 March 1948) is an econometrician and one of the most widely cited economists of all time. Since 1979 he has been Professor of Economics and Statistics at Yale University. He also holds positions at the University of Auckland, Singapore Management University and the University of Southampton. He is currently the co-director of Center for Financial Econometrics of Sim Kee Boon Institute for Financial Economics at Singapore Management University and is an adjunct professor of econometrics at the University of Southampton. He was previously Professor of Econometrics and Social Statistics at the University of Birmingham.

== Education ==
During his schooling, Phillips was the dux of Mount Albert Grammar School in New Zealand. He received a B.A. and M.A. from the University of Auckland and won prizes in both mathematics and economics. He received his PhD from London School of Economics under the supervision of John Denis Sargan in 1974.

== Research ==
He is a founding editor of the journal Econometric Theory. Peter Phillips has published many theoretical articles and advanced many research areas in econometrics. He has published important articles on continuous time econometrics, finite-sample theory, asymptotic expansions, unit root and cointegration, long-range dependent time series, and panel data econometrics. He also introduced the use of the functional central limit theorem to derive asymptotic distributions of unit roots tests. Phillips mainly used frequentist statistical methods. Phillips has also supervised numerous Ph.D. students, including Steve Durlauf. In 1993 he was elected as a Fellow of the American Statistical Association. According to the November 2015 ranking of economists by Research Papers in Economics, he is the 5th most influential economist.

== Festschrift ==
In 2012, The Journal of Econometrics dedicated two Festschrifts to Phillips under the title Recent Advances in Nonstationary Time Series: A Festschrift in honor of Peter C.B. Phillips.

== Selected publications ==
- Corbae, Dean; Durlauf, Steven N.; Hansen, Bruce E. (eds.). Econometric Theory and Practice; Frontiers of Analysis and Applied Research.
- ——— (1987). "Time Series Regression with a Unit Root". Econometrica. 55 (2): 277–301. doi:10.2307/1913237. JSTOR 1913237.
- ———; Perron, Pierre (1988). "Testing for a Unit Root in Time Series Regression" (PDF). Biometrika. 75 (2): 335–346. doi:10.1093/biomet/75.2.335.
- ———; Wang, Qiying (2009). "Structural Nonparametric Cointegrating Regression". Econometrica. 77 (6): 1901–1948. doi:10.3982/ECTA7732. S2CID 438765.
