= Econometric Theory =

- Discipline: Econometrics
- Language: English
- Edited by: Patrik Guggenberger, Liangjun Su, Yixiao Sun

Publication details
- History: 1985–present
- Publisher: Cambridge University Press
- Frequency: Bimonthly

Standard abbreviations
- ISO 4: Econom. Theory
- MathSciNet: Econometric Theory

Indexing
- ISSN: 0266-4666 (print); 1469-4360 (web)
- OCLC no.: 45127709

Links
- Journal homepage; Online access

Econometric Theory is a peer-reviewed academic journal specialising in econometrics, published by Cambridge University Press. The journal was founded by Peter C.B. Phillips, who served as editor from its inception in 1985 until December 2025. It is considered one of the leading journals in the field of econometrics. The current editors-in-chief are Patrik Guggenberger (Penn State University), Liangjun Su (Tsinghua University), and Yixiao Sun (University of California, San Diego).

The journal publishes original research that advances the theoretical foundations of econometrics across all major areas of the field, and strengthens the probabilistic and statistical underpinnings of econometric methodology for modeling, estimation, prediction, and inference. In addition to original research articles, the journal also publishes historical studies on the evolution of econometric thought and interviews with leading scholars.
