= Yun Sing Koh =

Computer scientist in New Zealand (born 1978)

- Born: 1978

Academic background
- Education: University of Otago, Universiti Malaya
- Thesis: Generating sporadic association rules (2007)

Yun Sing Koh (born 1978) is a New Zealand computer science academic, and is a full professor at the University of Auckland, specialising in machine learning and artificial intelligence. She is a co-director of the Centre of Machine Learning for Social Good, and the Advanced Machine Learning and Data Analytics Research (MARS) Lab at Auckland.

== Academic career ==
Koh earned a Bachelor of Science with Honours and a Master of Software Engineering at the University of Malaya. She then completed a PhD titled Generating sporadic association rules at the University of Otago in 2007. Koh joined the faculty of the University of Auckland in 2010, rising to full professor. As of 2024, she is director of the Centre of Machine Learning for Social Good at Auckland, alongside Gillian Dobbie and Daniel Wilson, and is director of the Master of AI course at the university. Koh also co-directs the Advanced Machine Learning and Data Analytics Research (MARS) Lab.

Koh's research covers machine learning and artificial intelligence. She is especially interested in designing machine learning algorithms for data streams, and has led research using AI systems to identify individual stoats for pest population research. In 2018 she was awarded a Marsden grant for a research project "An Adaptive Predictive System for Life-long Learning on Data Streams", and has been part of three MBIE projects. In 2025 the stoat identification project Koh co-leads with Daniel Wilson was awarded $1 million per annum by the MBIE Smart Ideas fund.

Koh was a finalist in the AI in Climate section of the Women in AI Australia and New Zealand Awards in 2022. She was a 2023 Fellow at the United States National Science Foundation-funded Convergence Research (CORE) Institute. Koh has chaired a number of sessions at international conferences on data mining.

In March 2026 it was announced that Koh would be a member of the New Zealand Human Rights Commission's Expert Advisory Group on Artificial Intelligence, Emerging Digital Technologies and Human Rights.

== Selected works ==
- Philippe Fournier-Viger; Jerry Chun-Wei Lin; Rage Uday Kiran; Koh, Yun Sing; Rincy Thomas (2017). "A Survey of Sequential Pattern Mining". Data Science and Pattern Recognition. 1 (1): 54–77. Wikidata Q138719481.
- Koh, Yun Sing; Rountree, Nathan; O'Keefe, Richard (2006). "Finding Non-Coincidental Sporadic Rules Using Apriori-Inverse". International Journal of Data Warehousing and Mining (in Ndonga). 2 (2): 38–54. doi:10.4018/jdwm.2006040102. Wikidata Q125185222.
- Pears, Russel; Sripirakas Sakthithasan; Koh, Yun Sing (2014). "Detecting concept change in dynamic data streams". Machine Learning. 97 (3): 259–293. doi:10.1007/s10994-013-5433-9. Zbl 1319.68186. Wikidata Q125185156.
- Huang, David Tse Jung; Koh, Yun Sing; Dobbie, Gillian; Pears, Russel (2014). "Detecting Volatility Shift in Data Streams". 2014 IEEE International Conference on Data Mining. pp. 863–868. doi:10.1109/ICDM.2014.50. ISBN 978-1-4799-4302-9.
- Tsang, Sidney; Koh, Yun Sing; Dobbie, Gillian (2011). "RP-Tree: Rare Pattern Tree Mining". Data Warehousing and Knowledge Discovery. Lecture Notes in Computer Science. Vol. 6862. pp. 277–288. doi:10.1007/978-3-642-23544-3_21. ISBN 978-3-642-23543-6.
- Koh, Yun Sing; Sri Devi Ravana (2016). "Unsupervised Rare Pattern Mining". ACM Transactions on Knowledge Discovery from Data. 10 (4): 1–29. doi:10.1145/2898359. Wikidata Q125185136.
- Julian, Jack; Koh, Yun Sing; Bifet, Albert (2025). "Building adaptive knowledge bases for evolving continual learning models". npj Artificial Intelligence. 1 26. doi:10.1038/s44387-025-00028-4. hdl:10289/18581.
