= Ella Henry =

New Zealand Māori academic, writer and actor

Ella Henry MNZM
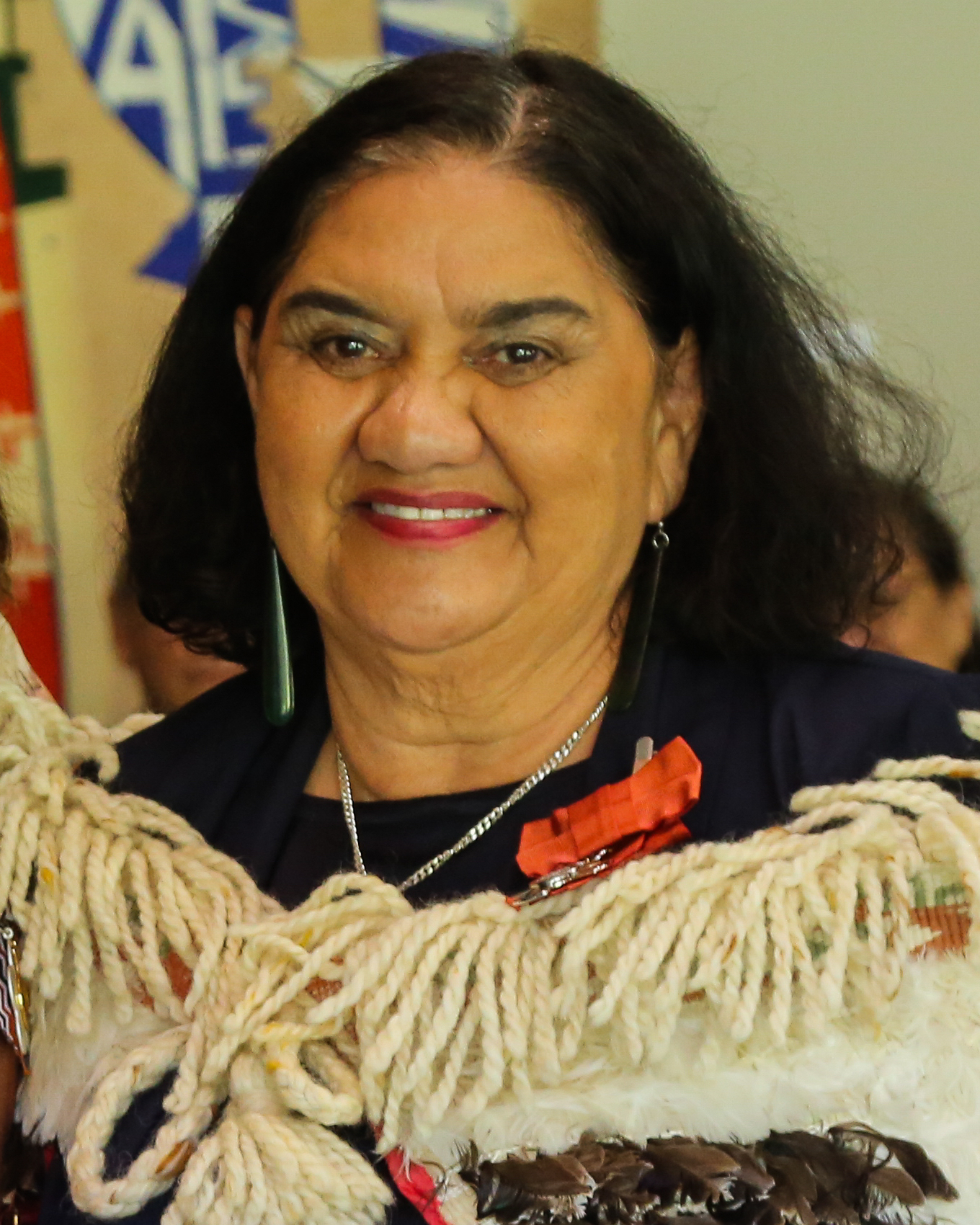
- Henry in 2022
- Born: Ella Yvette Henry; 1954 (age 71–72); Kaitaia, New Zealand

Academic background
- Education: Auckland University of Technology
- Thesis: Te Wairua Auaha: emancipatory Māori entrepreneurship in screen production (2012)
- Doctoral advisor: Pare Keiha; Charles Crothers

Ella Yvette Henry MNZM (born 1954) is a New Zealand Māori academic, affiliated with Ngātikahu ki Whangaroa, Ngāti Kuri, and Te Rārawa iwi. In June 2022 she was appointed a Member of the New Zealand Order of Merit (MNZM) for services to Māori, education and media. As of 2022 she is a full professor in the business school at Auckland University of Technology, specialising in Māori media.

== Academic career ==
Henry was born in 1954 in Kaitaia. She is from a poor family, and was the first in her whānau (extended family) to attend university, and went despite less-than-positive experiences at high school. She was expelled from school at the age of 15, but when she got to university she found out "[she] wasn't as stupid as [she] thought [she] was". Henry has a Bachelor of Arts and a Master of Philosophy from the University of Auckland. Her MPhil thesis was titled Rangatira wahine: Maori women managers & leadership, and was completed in 1994. In 2012 she completed a PhD titled Te Wairua Auaha: emancipatory Māori entrepreneurship in screen production at Auckland University of Technology, supervised by Pare Keiha and Charles Crothers.

In 1990 she was president of the Auckland University Students' Association. An active member of the NewLabour Party, she was the party's education spokesperson and stood in the seat of Roskill at the 1990 general election.

From 2002 to 2004, Henry was Head of Puukenga School of Māori Education at Unitec Institute of Technology, before moving to the Auckland University of Technology, where she is Director of Māori Advancement. She was promoted to full professor in 2022.

Henry has a background in the screen industry, having been a writer, actor, commentator and presenter. Between 2004 and 2007 she was the host of the Whakaata Māori show called Ask your Aunties, and played the occasional character of Auntie Kuini on Shortland Street. She helped to establish Nga Aho Whakaari (the Association of Māori in Screen Production), and was then appointed as chair. She has also chaired the Association of Women in Film and Television New Zealand.

She was executive director for Greenpeace in 1994 and in 2001 was a Human Rights Commissioner, before resigning after being criticised by Police for using her position to make allegations of racism against a police officer in relation to a traffic matter involving her partner. Henry has been a Treaty negotiator for Ngātikahu ki Whangaroa iwi and chaired the Post-Settlement Governance Entity until 2019.

Henry says:

“I’ve been in the tertiary education sector for 36 years. I have had the opportunity to complete a number of degrees and study my people and culture. I didn’t know that we had such an extraordinary history until I went to university. When you learn stuff like that it really does change the way you look at who you are, what you are and where you fit in the world.”

== Honours and awards ==
Henry was appointed a Member of the New Zealand Order of Merit in the 2022 Queen's Birthday and Platinum Jubilee Honours, for services to Māori, education and media.

== Selected works ==
- Henry, Ella Yvette; Hone Pene (2001). "Kaupapa Maori: Locating Indigenous Ontology, Epistemology and Methodology in the Academy". Organization. 8 (2): 234–242. doi:10.1177/1350508401082009. Wikidata Q115567722.
- Howard H Frederick; Henry, Ella Yvette. "Innovation and entrepreneurship amongst Pakeha and Maori in New Zealand". International Research in the Business Disciplines: 115–140. doi:10.1016/s1074-7877(03)04006-6. Wikidata Q115567720.
- Spiller, Chellie; Rachel Maunganui Wolfgramm; Henry, Ella Yvette; Robert Pouwhare (2019). "Paradigm warriors: Advancing a radical ecosystems view of collective leadership from an Indigenous Māori perspective". Human Relations. 73 (4): 516–543. doi:10.1177/0018726719893753. Wikidata Q115567716.
- Henry, Ella Yvette; Jamie Newth; Spiller, Chellie (2017). "Emancipatory Indigenous social innovation: Shifting power through culture and technology". Journal of Management and Organization. 23 (6): 786–802. doi:10.1017/jmo.2017.64. Wikidata Q115567719.
- Henry, Ella Yvette; Leo-Paul Dana; Patrick J. Murphy (2017). "Telling their own stories: Māori entrepreneurship in the mainstream screen industry". Entrepreneurship and Regional Development. 30 (1–2): 118–145. doi:10.1080/08985626.2017.1388445. Wikidata Q115567718.
- Henry, Ella Yvette; Rachel Wolfgramm (2015). "Relational leadership – An indigenous Māori perspective". Leadership: 174271501561628. doi:10.1177/1742715015616282. Wikidata Q115567717.
- Pouarii Tanner (2018). New Pacific Standard: Using Tivaevae to Inform a New Strategic Business Model for Pacific Art and Design (Master of Cultural and Creative Practice thesis). Auckland University of Technology. hdl:10292/11650. Wikidata Q112938402.
