= National Youth Theatre Company =

New Zealand youth theatre company

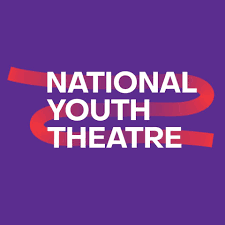
The NYT. Logo of The National Youth Theatre

The National Youth Theatre Formerly known as the National Youth Theatre Company is a not-for-profit organisation that runs musical theatre training workshops and musical productions in New Zealand. It was established in 2005, with the aim of providing opportunities for young people to participate in performing arts training. The company provides training strictly to New Zealand youth, between ages 7 and 21, and each show has multiple casts, enabling more young people to perform on stage.

== Programmes and productions ==
National Youth Theatre Company has put on a number of full-scale musical productions since its opening including:

- Cinderella (Bruce Mason Centre, Auckland, 2005)
- Annie (Bruce Mason Centre, Auckland, 2005)
- Seussical (Bruce Mason Centre, Auckland, 2006)
- Disney's Aladdin Jr. (Centennial Theatre, Auckland, 2006)
- Disney's High School Musical - Auckland Theatrical Premiere (Aotea Centre, Auckland, 2007)
- Disney's High School Musical ENCORE (Civic Theatre, 2007)
- Disney's Alice in Wonderland Jr - New Zealand Theatrical Premiere (Dorothy Winstone Centre, Auckland, 2007)
- Grease (Aotea Centre, Auckland, June 2008)
- The Wiz (Dorothy Winstone Centre, Auckland, 2008)
- Disney's High School Musical 2 (Aotea Centre, Auckland, August 2009)
- Honk! (Dorothy Winstone Centre, Auckland, November 2009)
- Peter Pan (Aotea Centre, Auckland, May 2010)
- Seussical (Dorothy Winstone Centre, Auckland, November 2010)
- The Sound of Music (Aotea Centre, Auckland, July 2011)
- Disney's Camp Rock The Musical - New Zealand Theatrical Premiere (Dorothy Winstone Centre, Auckland, December 2011)
- Joseph and the Amazing Technicolor Dreamcoat (Aotea Centre, Auckland, July 2012)
- Disney's My Son Pinocchio: Geppetto's Musical Tale (Dorothy Winstone Centre, Auckland, December 2012)
- Grease (Aotea Centre, Auckland, June 2013)
- Disney's Aladdin Jr. (Dorothy Winstone Centre, Auckland, November 2013)
- The Wizard of Oz (Aotea Centre, Auckland, June 2014)
- Disney's The Little Mermaid Jr. (Dorothy Winstone Centre, Auckland, November 2014)
- Seussical (Aotea Centre, Auckland, July 2015)
- Disney's Beauty and the Beast (Aotea Centre, Auckland, December 2015)
- Disney's High School Musical 1 & 2 Theatrical Premiere (Civic Theatre Auckland, July 2016)
- Joseph and the Amazing Technicolor Dreamcoat (Aotea Centre, Auckland, December 2016)
- Oliver! (Aotea Centre, Auckland June 2017)
- Peter Pan (Aotea Centre, Auckland, December 2017)
- Cats (Aotea Centre, Auckland, June 2018)
- Shrek the musical (2018 November civc)
- Annie (2019 June Aotea Centre Auckland)(2019 June Aotea Centre Auckland)
- The Wizard of Oz (2019 November Aotea Centre Auckland)
- Disney's Beauty and the Beast (June 2021) at the Kiri Te Kanawa Theatre, Aotea Centre
- Oliver! (July 2022) at the Kiri Te Kanawa Theatre, Aotea Centre
- Wendy, the Peter Pan Musical (December 2022) at the Kiri Te Kanawa Theatre, Aotea Centre
- Cats (June 2023) at the Kiri Te Kanawa Theatre, Aotea Centre
- High School Musical (December 2023) at the Kiri Te Kanawa Theatre, Aotea Centre
- Joseph and the Amazing Technicolor Dreamcoat (June 2024) at the Kiri Te Kanawa Theatre, Aotea Centre
- Alice: A Wonderland Musical (December 2024) at the Kiri Te Kanawa Theatre, Aotea Centre
- Seussical (June 2025) at the Kiri Te Kanawa Theatre, Aotea Centre
- The Wizard of Oz (November 2025) at the Kiri Te Kanawa Theatre, Aotea Centre
- The Little Mermaid (June 2026) at the Kiri Te Kanawa Theatre, Aotea Centre
- Diary of a Wimpy Kid: The Musical (November 2026) at the Kiri Te Kanawa Theatre, Aotea Centre

=== Artistic Patrons ===
- Carl Doy
- Jason Gunn
