= Paul Baker (anaesthetist) =

New Zealand anaesthetist

Sir Paul Baker KNZM
- Baker in 2026
- Born: Paul Andrew Baker
- Education: University of Auckland
- Scientific career
- Fields: Anaesthesia; airway management
- Workplaces: University of Auckland
- Thesis: Improving the quality and safety of airway management (2013)
- Doctoral advisor: John Thompson; Brian Anderson; Alan Merry
- Website: University profile

Sir Paul Andrew Baker KNZM is a New Zealand anaesthetist. An associate professor at the University of Auckland, he researches airway management in both adults and children, with a particular focus on emergency airway management, education and ethics.

== Education ==
Baker studied medicine at the University of Auckland, graduating Bachelor of Human Biology, Bachelor of Medicine, Bachelor of Surgery in 1980, before completing specialist anaesthesiology training in 1986. He later earned a Doctor of Medicine degree, also from Auckland, with a 2013 thesis, Improving the Quality and Safety of Airway Management, supervised by Brian Anderson, John Thompson and Alan Merry.

== Career ==
Baker's medical career has been as an airway management specialist and paediatric anaesthetist. He worked as a consultant anaesthetist at Auckland Hospital, and was a foundation consultant anaesthetist at Starship Children's Hospital in 1991. In 1996, he contributed to patient safety by creating AirwaySkills, the southern hemisphere's first training programme teaching the management of difficult airways, through which he has personally trained more than 5000 anaesthetists, emergency physicians and intensive-care doctors.

In 2004, Baker led a team of 26 clinicians that successfully performed New Zealand's first ex utero intrapartum treatment (EXIT) procedure. In 2006, he founded the medical innovation company Airway Limited. He led the invention of ORSIM, a virtual reality bronchoscopy training simulator, now used in more than 40 countries. As of 2026, Baker has authored or co-authored 96 peer-reviewed publications and book chapters on airway safety, paediatric airway management and medical ethics. His research led to the adoption of national equipment standards, and every operating theatre in New Zealand being equipped to manage difficult airways.

Baker has served as chairman of the international committee of the World Airway Management Meeting, and president of the Society for Airway Management USA.

In 2023, Baker retired from clinical practice, but he continues to research and teach at the University of Auckland, where he has held a permanent, part-time position since 2009.

== Honours and awards ==
Baker was elected a Fellow of the European Airway Management Society in 2018. He is also a Fellow of the Australian and New Zealand College of Anaesthetists. In the 2026 King's Birthday Honours, he was appointed a Knight Companion of the New Zealand Order of Merit, for services to health.

== Selected publications ==
- Tim Dare; Paul A. Baker; Sarah M. Anderson (2024). "Paediatric emergency front-of-neck airway: issues of ethics, law, and philosophy". British Journal of Anaesthesia. 132 (4): 631–634. doi:10.1016/j.bja.2023.12.009. PMID 38245452. Wikidata Q129640602.
- Paul A. Baker (2019). "Assessment and management of the predicted difficult airway in babies and children". Anaesthesia and Intensive Care Medicine. 20 (1): 42–51. doi:10.1016/j.mpaic.2018.11.001. Wikidata Q128783350.
- Paul Baker (2015). "Preparedness and education in airway management". Anesthesiology Clinics. 33 (2): 381–395. doi:10.1016/j.anclin.2015.02.007. PMID 25999010. Wikidata Q30203657.
