= Murray Thom =

New Zealand music producer and entrepreneur

Thom in 2026

Murray Neville Thom ONZM (born 19 July 1957) is a New Zealand businessman and music producer. He is best known for his collaboration with pianist Carl Doy, which resulted in their Together 10-CD collection being featured as one of Oprah's Favorite Things of 2002. Locally, his production company, Thom Productions is best known for the 12× platinum Great New Zealand Songbook and The Great New Zealand Cookbook, which have also been released in numerous versions for other countries.

== Career ==
=== Music ===
Thom joined CBS Records International as a sales representative in 1979. He was appointed managing director of CBS in 1981, at that time the youngest CBS managing director in the world. Thom left the corporate life to establish his own business in 1986.

He signed New Zealand recording artist Dave Dobbyn who had featured on the Footrot Flats album and together they produced the Loyal album.

Thom discovered pianist Carl Doy playing in the lobby of an Auckland hotel in 1987 and together they produced their first album Piano By Candlelight in 1987. They have produced a number of recordings specifically for China. In the US, the Together collaboration with Doy was packaged into a 10 CD and book collection, which Oprah featured on her show as one of Oprah's Favorite Things of 2002.

In 1996 after seeing Rob Guest performing in the leading role of Jean Valjean in Les Misérables, Thom signed Guest to a recording contract. Guest's album Unmasked was released in 1997 by Thom.

Thom was the creator and executive producer of The Great New Zealand Songbook released in 2009. The album went on to become certified 12× platinum. Thom followed up with The Great Australian Songbook released in 2011.

Thom collaborated with Neil Finn to re-record the war song "Blue Smoke", which was released on Anzac Day 2015, with proceeds going to the Returned Services Association.

In 2019 Thom and Tim Harper produced The Offering Project, which was a collaboration between twelve New Zealand recording artists and twelve of New Zealand visual artists. The concept was to record well known gospel hymns that were also interpreted by visual artists, with all the proceeds going to the work of the Salvation Army in New Zealand.

=== Books ===
Following the release of The Great Australian Songbook, Thom produced The Great New Zealand Cookbook – instead of 40 recording artists writing their lyrics, this was 80 cooks, chefs and bakers handwriting their recipes. The book won the 2015 Gourmand World Cookbook award for ‘Best Easy Recipes’.

Further publications were produced including The Great Australian Cookbook (2016), The Great South African Cookbook (2016), The Really Quite Good British Cookbook (2017), with front cover art by Sir Peter Blake, and America The Great Cookbook (2017).

Thom released his memoir Eat, Drink & Be Murray in 2019.

== Honours and awards ==
In the 2026 King's Birthday Honours, Thom was appointed an Officer of the New Zealand Order of Merit, for services to the arts and philanthropy.

== Personal life ==
Thom's hobby is sailing and in 2005 he won the World Laser Master Championships in Fortaleza, Brazil.
