= Adrienne Jansen =

New Zealand creative writing teacher, editor and writer

Adrienne Jansen ONZM
- Jansen in 2026
- Born: 1947 (age 78–79); Wellington, New Zealand
- Occupations: Writer; publisher

Adrienne Anne Jansen ONZM (born 1947) is a New Zealand creative writing teacher, editor, writer of fiction, non-fiction and poetry, and publisher. She has worked closely with immigrants, and her writing often relates to the migrant experience.

== Biography ==
Adrienne Jansen was born in Wellington in 1947.

She worked as a writer at the Museum of New Zealand Te Papa Tongarewa for 11 years. She was also heavily involved in refugee resettlement and teaching ESOL (English for speakers of other languages). In the 1980s, she helped set up the Porirua Language Project (now part of English Language Partners). This background and her years of experience of living and working among immigrants is reflected in her writing (both fiction and non-fiction), which often focuses on the migrant experience. She has frequently worked alongside migrants to help them tell their stories.

Her published work includes fiction and non-fiction for adults and children, collections of poetry, short stories broadcast on radio and poems and stories in anthologies such as 4th Floor and Best New Zealand Poems. Her stories have been highly commended in the Commonwealth Short Story Competition ("War", 2002) and shortlisted for the BNZ Literary Awards. She worked with Guy Jansen in the last years of his life on his book Sing New Zealand: the story of choral music in Aotearoa.

In 1990, Jansen was a Winston Churchill Fellow, travelling to Canada and the United Kingdom to look at access to education for disadvantaged groups in those countries. She founded the Creative Writing Programme at Whitireia Polytechnic in 1993. This was the first full-year, full-time writing course in New Zealand, and it was designed by Jansen to be accessible to all and to encourage diversity and inclusiveness. She was coordinator of the programme until 1999 and taught fiction and editing as well as writing several online courses until most of the programme was disestablished in 2019. She was co-founder of Whitireia Creative Writing Programme's Escalator Press in 2013 and her novel The Score was the first book to be published by this new imprint. In 2016, she helped set up Landing Press.

Jansen has appeared at numerous author talks and writing festivals. She has also run creative writing workshops for Māori writers (with Huia Publishers), Pasifika writers (with Creative New Zealand) and in Vanuatu and Indonesia.

Her manuscript "Light Keeping" was shortlisted for the 2021 Michael Gifkins Prize.

In the 2026 King’s Birthday Honours, Jansen was appointed an Officer of the New Zealand Order of Merit, for services to writing and publishing.

She lives in Titahi Bay, Porirua.

== Bibliography ==
Non-fiction

- Neighbourhood Groups: ideas to get you started, co-authored with Sally Tripp (NZWEA, 1981; new ed. Whitcoulls, 1986)
- Having a Baby in New Zealand, co-authored with Ruth Dawson (Wellington Multicultural Educational Resource Centre, 1984), published in English, Samoan, Cantonese, Vietnamese and Khmer
- I Have in My Arms Both Ways (Bridget Williams Books, 1990, republished 2015)
- The Crescent Moon: The Asian Face of Islam in New Zealand, with photographs by Ans Westra (Asia New Zealand Foundation, 2009)
- Abdel's Favourites from the Marrakech Café, with Abdelghani El Adraoui (Marrakech Café, 2013)
- Migrant Journeys: New Zealand Taxi Drivers Tell Their Stories, with co-author Liz Grant (Bridget Williams Books, 2015)

Children's non-fiction

- Borany's story (Learning Media, 1991), shortlisted for the LIANZA Elsie Locke Non-Fiction Award in 1992
- Thirteen flavours (Learning Media, 1995)
- Asli's story (Learning Media, 2000)
- I say, you say (Learning Media, 2001)
- What's the difference? (Learning Media, 2001)
- Fear (Learning Media, 2002)
- A pot of gold; and, The clever farmer : folk tales from Vietnam (Learning Media, 2003)

Novels

- Spirit Writing (Harper Collins, 1999)
- Floating the Fish on Bamboo (Harper Collins, 2001)
- The Score (Escalator Press, 2013)
- A Line of Sight (Escalator Press, 2015)
- A Change of Key (Escalator Press, 2018)
- Light Keeping (Quentin Wilson Publishing, 2023)

Poetry

- A stone seat and a shadow tree (Inkweed, 2001)
- Keel & drift (Landing Press, 2016)
- All of us (with Carina Gallegos) (Landing Press, 2018)

As editor

- The Curioseum: Collected Stories of the Odd and Marvellous (Te Papa Press, 2014), shortlisted for the Publishers Association of New Zealand (PANZ) Book Design Awards 2015
- More of us (Landing Press, 2019)
- Somewhere a Cleaner (Landing Press, 2020)
- More than a Roof (Landing Press, 2021)
