= Farmy Army =

Volunteer organisation in New Zealand

The Farmy Army is a group of farmers in New Zealand co-ordinated by the Federated Farmers who volunteer to assist recovery after natural disasters. It formed after the 2010 Canterbury earthquake and has also assisted the recovery after the 2011 Christchurch earthquake, 2016 Kaikōura earthquake and 2023's Cyclone Gabrielle.

== History ==
The Farmy Army formed after the September 2010 Canterbury earthquake and is co-ordinated by Federated Farmers. The name Farmy Army was trademarked in 2011.

== Events ==
=== 2010–2011 Canterbury earthquakes ===
The Farmy Army was headquartered at the Canterbury Agricultural Park during the Canterbury earthquake cleanup. They supplied and used over 100 pieces of machinery, including diggers, tipping trucks trailers and loaders. The Farmy Army also provided meat and wool as part of a "meat the needs of Christchurch" campaign, and with their kitchen they provided about 2,500 hot meals for members of the public. By May 2011, over 4,500 people had contributed to the clearing of over 100,000 cubic metres of liquefaction sludge. The Farmy Army worked with the Christchurch City Council, Civil Defence and the company Fulton Hogan. The Farmy Army and Student Volunteer Army also helped clear liquefaction after the June 2011 Christchurch earthquake.

In 2013 John Hartnell, who co-ordinated the liquefaction cleanup as well as the delivery and making of food after the 2011 earthquake, was made a member of the New Zealand Order of Merit for services to the community and beekeeping.

=== 2016 Kaikōura earthquake ===
In response to the 2016 Kaikōura earthquake, a "virtual Farmy Army" was created. A phone number, 0800FARMING, was set up to pair up the people in need of help with the people who wanted to offer help.

=== 2020 Southland floods ===
The Farmy Army helped with the recovery after flooding in Southland occurred in 2020.

=== Cyclone Gabrielle ===
After 2023's Cyclone Gabrielle, the Farmy Army was a partner in the Commence the Re-Fence campaign along with CNH and the agriculture company Stevenson & Taylor. It fixed and replaced fences in farms, orchards, vineyards and lifestyle blocks that were damaged or destroyed by the cyclone. The service ended in May 2024 and gave away the two tractors that were used in the campaign. In 2024 during the Primary Industries New Zealand Awards, Alastair Macgregor was given the Rural Hero of the Year award for his work with the Farmy Army on the recovery after spending over 200 hours working on the fences in Tutira and Waipukurau.

Other recovery work done by the Farmy Army involved planting trees and general cleanup. In March 2023, over 200 volunteers helped with the recovery.
