= Marsden grant =

Set of research grants awarded by Royal Society of New Zealand

Marsden Fund grants are contestable funding for investigator-led fundamental research in New Zealand. Grants are made in all areas of research in science, engineering, and mathematics. The grants are made from the Marsden Fund, which was established by the New Zealand Government in 1994. The Marsden Fund is administered by the Royal Society of New Zealand. Most of the grants go to researchers at New Zealand universities, but some go to researchers at Crown Research Institutes and elsewhere. The grants are named after English-New Zealand physicist Ernest Marsden (1889–1970). In December 2024, the Government announced that it would end Marsden grants to humanities and social science research to focus on "core sciences" that would "grow the New Zealand economy." The final round of the Marsden Fund grants took place in 2026, to be replaced in 2027 by a transition fund intended to align with government priorities.

== History ==
The first Marsden Fund grants were awarded in 1995, when NZ$10.2 million (excluding GST) was shared between 51 successful projects. In 2001, the Fast Start category was introduced specifically for Early Career Researchers (within 7 years of completing their PhD). By 2018, the size of the Marsden Fund had grown to NZ$85.6 million and 136 grants were made. These included 53 Fast Start grants and 83 Standard grants. The 2018 round also introduced a new category of grant, the Marsden Fund Council Award. These larger grants are focused on interdisciplinary research; however, there were no successful applications in the initial round.

On 4 December 2024, Minister for Research, Science and Innovation Judith Collins announced that funding for humanities and social science research would be dropped from the Marsden Fund, and that their panels would be disbanded in 2025. She said that the New Zealand Government would focus on "core sciences" such as physics, chemistry, mathematics, engineering and the biomedical sciences that would support economic growth, scientific and technological development. The changes to the Marsden Fund's terms of reference were condemned by eighty researchers in an open letter to the Minister. A spokesperson for the group said "the changes amounted to political overreach...the Marsden Fund has for a long time been the flagship fund for social science and humanities researchers, I think this is why this decision is so hurtful".

== Application process ==
The Marsden Fund granting process is highly competitive, with over 1,000 applications per year and success rates that often hover around 10%. Proposals are assessed primarily on the potential of the research to contribute to the advancement of knowledge, with long-term benefits to New Zealand. In the 2018 funding round, the success rate was 11.2% for Standard grants and 14.8% for Fast Start grants. Because of this intense competition, winning a Marsden Fund grant is regarded as a hallmark of research excellence in New Zealand.

Successful proposals are selected by the Marsden Fund Council. In 2022 there were 113 research projects funded nationally.

=== Marsden Fund Council ===
The Marsden Fund Council are appointed by the New Zealand Minister for Research, Science and Innovation. In 2022 the council was made up of the following people who convene different panels: Professor Gillian Dobbie (Chair), Professor Jacqueline Beggs, Professor Penny Brothers, Professor Colin Brown, Professor Kathleen Campbell, Distinguished Professor Geoff Chase, Dr Richard Newcomb, Professor Chellie Spiller, Distinguished Professor Paul Spoonley and Professor Cynthia White.

== Budget Allocations ==
Allocated spending for the Marsden grant by year
Year	Funding, Millions NZD
2026	56
2022	almost 78
2020	79
2019	79
2018	71
2017	64
2016	58
2015	54
2014	52
2013	52
2012	47
2011	47
2010	47
