= Student Volunteer Army =

Volunteer organisation based at the University of Canterbury, New Zealand

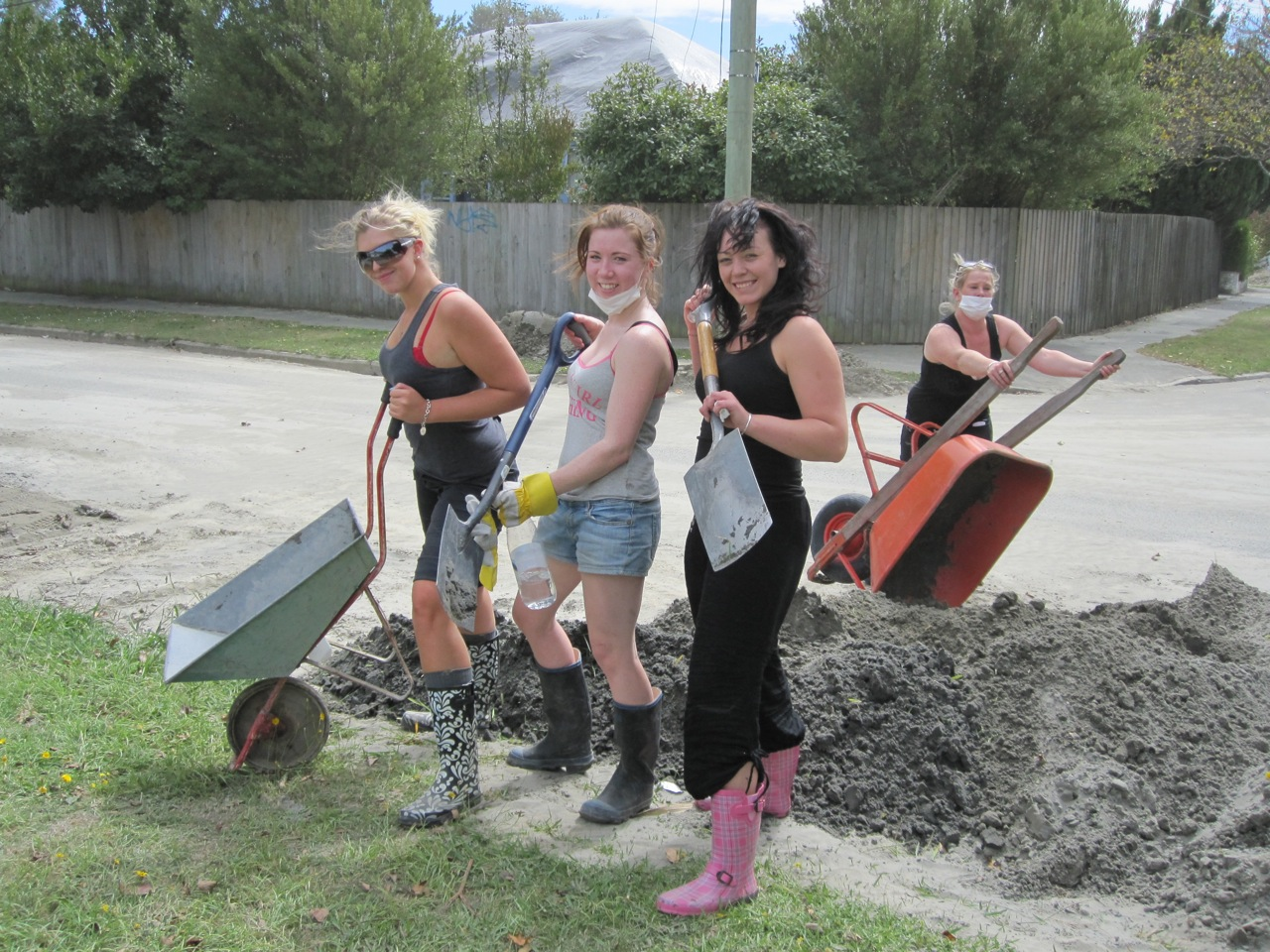
- Student Volunteer Army team in 2011
- Abbreviation: SVA
- Founded: 2010
- Type: Student club, non-profit organisation
- Purpose: Volunteering
- Location: Christchurch, New Zealand
- President: Gareth Harcombe
- Volunteers: 3000
- Website: Official website

The Student Volunteer Army (SVA) is a New Zealand student movement born from a Facebook page started following the 2011 Christchurch earthquake. The network has no military affiliation and is focused on facilitating community action through youth engagement, preparing for disasters, and service. The clubs and volunteers are supported by the Volunteer Army Foundation (VAF).

Whilst the movement grew to address community needs in the recovery period following the Christchurch earthquakes, the SVA has never been a solely disaster response focused organisation. The movement operates under an aim to make volunteering and service an intrinsic part of the student experience, and show all New Zealanders the power they have to drive the change they wish to see in their communities. It is this ethos that has allowed the movement to persist beyond the immediate earthquake response. The evidence of this ethos can be seen in the club culture of the UC Student Volunteer Army, and in initiatives such as the SVA School Kit and the Serve for New Zealand campaign.

== UC Student Volunteer Army ==
Since its inception in response to the earthquakes, the club has maintained a strong presence at the University of Canterbury. The club is the largest student society on campus, with over 3000 members, led by an executive committee of 30 students. The club is supported primarily by The University of Canterbury and City Care. The club's efforts in the years since the earthquakes have refocused from providing disaster relief responses, to be more focused on community upkeep and engagement. However, disaster response has still been maintained in the club's skill set, with important roles being played by the SVA in response and in the aftermaths of such major events as the 2016 Kaikōura earthquake, 2017 Port Hills fires, Christchurch mosque shootings as well as various floods.

The club currently runs a range of events on a yearly schedule. Amongst these are small-scale 'platoon projects' run every weekend targeted at making small but high impact volunteering contributions to those in need, the UCan Schools programme aimed at mentoring local high school students, giving them an insight to the SVA with the hopes they will uptake the ethos and values of the SVA in their own communities. Larger events include 'Connect the Community' intended to bring a large numbers of students into a residential area for a day to work with the local community, as well as two camps taking place in communities outside of the Christchurch area intended to give a wider view of the country to its members, do beneficial work as well as a providing a social experience for volunteers.

=== UC Student Volunteer Army Presidents ===
- 2027 – Flynn Turfrey-Rowe
- 2026 – Johann Torres
- 2025 – Connor Grant
- 2024 – Rosemary Yorke
- 2023 – Gareth Harcombe
- 2022 – Sophie Clarke
- 2021 – Luke Burke
- 2020 – Isabella Fanselow
- 2019 – Sati Ravichandiren
- 2018 – Josh Blackmore
- 2017 – Jared McMahon
- 2016 – Alex Cheesebrough
- 2015 – Lucy McLeod
- 2013–14 – Bridget Williams
- 2012 – Peter Jakowetz
- 2011–12 – Andrew Chalmers
- 2010–11 – Sam Johnson

== The UC Big Give ==
The club's largest annual event is The Big Give. This initiative started in 2017 and is targeted primarily at students new to the university and the city, with the goal to provide a fun, fulfillling, and beneficial volunteering experience reflective of the club's ethos. Students who have taken part in the event have typically done manual labour tasks and received a T-shirt, lunch and a concert for their efforts. The event has continually been the club's largest hosted event since the initial earthquakes.

=== 2017 Big Give ===
The inaugural Big Event was hosted in the Southshore Spit Reserve, in Southshore. Approximately 800 university students attended the event, where they worked to rebuild over 2 km of track around the reserve, remove an earthquake damaged seawall from the estuary, conduct invasive species control and restore 8 beach accessways in the wider community. The SVA also installed a picnic table at the site, and handprints from the event can still be seen in the concrete plinth surrounding the table. Entertainment was provided by Mako Road, a local university band.

The inaugural event proved the feasibility and benefit to community and students of the Big Give, and prompted the SVA to add the event to their annual calendar.

== Student Volunteer Army Foundation ==
The founders and key committee members from the February earthquake response team have since founded the non-profit Student Volunteer Army Foundation, previously known as the Volunteer Army Foundation (VAF). The foundation oversees, licenses, and trains all SVA chapters and shares, promotes and supports those interested in creating their own volunteer movement.

== History ==
=== Disaster response ===
==== September 2010 Christchurch earthquake ====
In the days immediately following the 4 September Christchurch earthquake, the campus of the University of Canterbury was closed to enable the buildings to be checked for structural safety, 21-year-old Sam Johnson started a Facebook event called the "Student Base for Earthquake Clean up" and invited friends to join with him in assisting local residents with non-lifesaving tasks, in particularly cleaning up soil liquefaction residue on the streets and gardens of the city.

Johnson invited 200 friends to the event which soon grew to have over 3000 attendees and over 2500 volunteers contributing to the clean up.

In an effort to continue the momentum of the initial cleanup, Johnson and the key organisers of the student initiative, Jade Rutherford, Gina Scandrett, Chris Duncan, Tommy Young and Sam Gifford, decided to work with the University of Canterbury Students Association President Kohan McNab to create a student club focused on student volunteering; named the UC Student Volunteer Army.

==== February 2011 Christchurch earthquake ====
The devastating 6.3 magnitude earthquake again struck Christchurch at 12.51 on 22 February 2011, causing widespread devastation and destruction. 185 people were killed, thousands of homes were damaged, and hundreds of buildings were uninhabitable. Johnson and the six original team members of the Student Volunteer Army teamed up with the University of Canterbury Student Association team, led by President Kohan McNab, Louis Brown from the Te Waipounamu Foundation, Nathan Durkin and Anthony Rohan from White Elephant Trust together with student clubs ENSOC, LAWSOC and MUSOC.

The February operation of the Student Volunteer Army was managed by a core team of 15 people and a wider administration of 70 people who managed the three core operations which the SVA focused on; battalions, squadrons and street teams.

The mass deployment of volunteering, dubbed ‘Battalions’, was the initial focus which saw a maximum of 1000 volunteers, fed, watered and allocated to the worst affected areas of Christchurch via charter buses. Squadrons filled a similar role, except instead of students combing the streets and methodically searching for work, the squadrons responded to requests from individuals for assistance that came via the website, call center, and partnerships with Civil Defence and city councils. Up to 450 car loads of students were allocated via this system, using a mix of software, texting, and Google mapping. Street teams managed volunteer engagement for various organizations including multiple government departments, Civil Defence, and Christchurch City Council.

The objective was to increase the efficiency in agencies providing a service; for example delivering chemical toilets and information pamphlets, laying sandbags, staffing data entry and manning call centres. While the perceived focus was on shovelling silt, what mattered most was the intergenerational connection being created and the conversations that occurred between residents and students. Nothing beats a friendly face to talk with.Two of the greatest challenges faced after both earthquakes was locating the areas where volunteers were most needed, and prioritizing the work load. With the help of Geoop.com and Snap Internet, Jonas Bergler and his team designed a mobile management system for the Squadrons whereby residents could register their need for assistance via a free call number, text message service or website. Each job was examined and prioritised by the call centre, manned by the Musical Theatre Society.In delegating team leaders to guide small crews to these sites the SVA, together with the Federated Farmers Farmy Army, helped clear over 360,000 tonnes of silt and clocked up over 80,000 volunteer working hours. The Facebook page had over 26,000 followers and continued to act as a platform to organise and coordinate volunteers Christchurch communities throughout 2011 following the June earthquake, and the shake of 23 December.

The team worked to increase the efficiency of distributing chemical toilets and pamphlets, as well as manning call centers. The student group became known as the Student Volunteer Army, with the Volunteer Army Foundation being the supporting Charity focused on disaster preparedness, youth engagement and service.

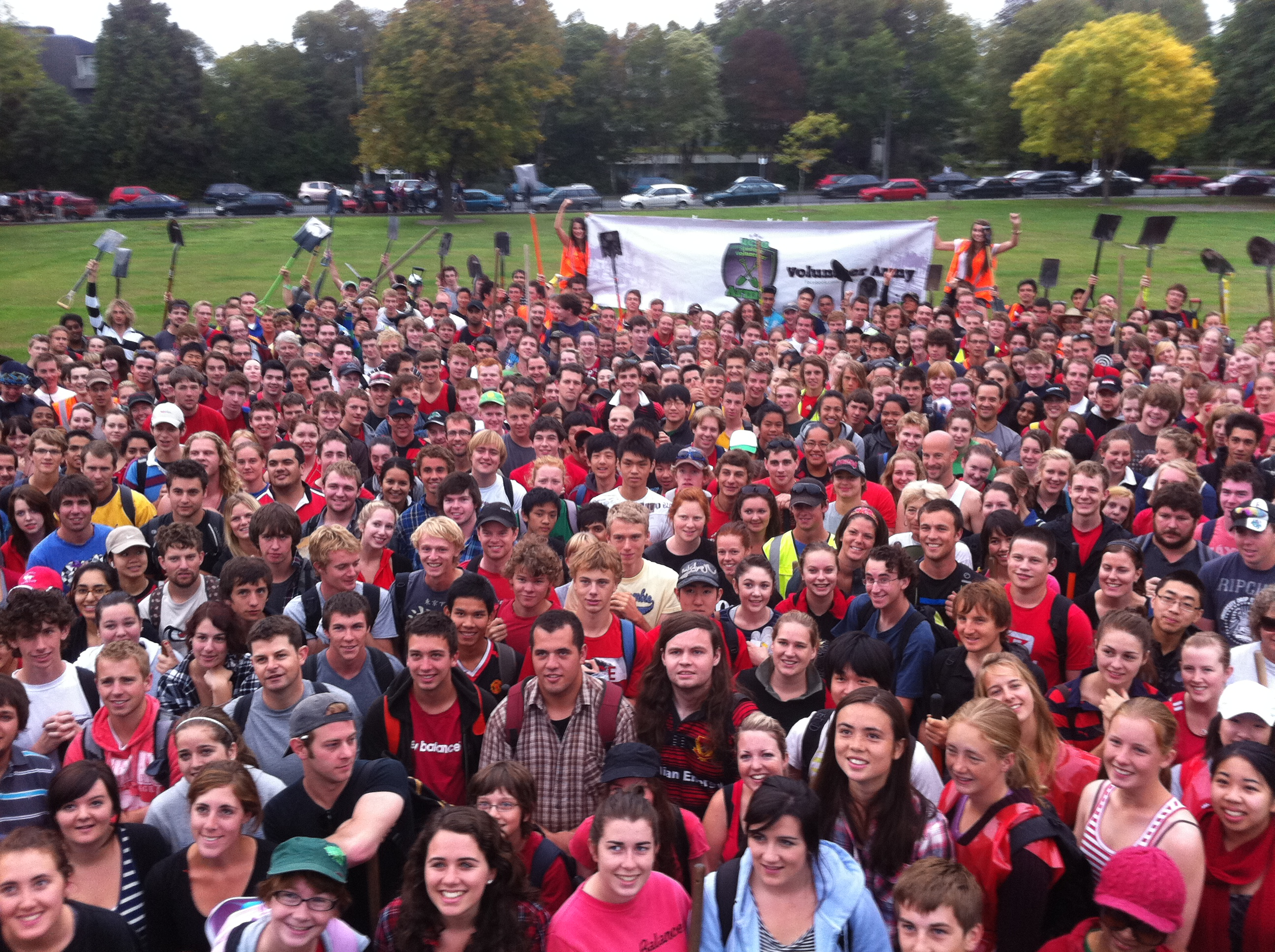
StudentArmy IlamSchool

A strong focus was also placed on the well-being of residents in the harder hit areas. Volunteers were encouraged to be a cheerful presence on the streets, offering food, drinks, and assistance in finding professional help. Johnson and the other members of the Student Volunteer Army were highly visible and featured in much of the news reporting of the earthquake. Organised using Facebook, and social media, the concept enabled thousands of students and residents of Christchurch to make a contribution to those most affected by the devastating earthquakes. At its peak, there were 13,000 students volunteering per week. The team of organisers received high praise from officials in New Zealand and this resulted in them speaking with Prince William about the potential programmes of volunteering involving young people.

==== Japan and New York ====
Shortly after the February 2011 earthquake in Christchurch, Japan experienced a large earthquake, tsunami, and nuclear plant meltdown. Global DIRT asked Sam Johnson and Jason Pemberton of the SVA, to help organize Japanese university students develop a similar volunteer program. Additionally, Global DIRT asked Pemberton and fellow SVA member Jackson Rowland to help New York City recover after Hurricane Sandy. The Volunteer Army Foundation now focuses on disaster response, preferring to help communities prepare and become more resilient to disasters.

=== Disaster preparedness ===
==== UNESCO Youth Beyond Disaster Forums ====
SVA Founder Sam Johnson chaired the planning committee for the inaugural "Looking Beyond Disasters" (LBD). LBD is an initiative of the NZ National Commission for UNESCO in partnership with the Bangkok UNESCO Office and the UNESCO Office of the Pacific in Apia. The focus of the program is to bring together young people who have experienced natural disasters in the Asia Pacific region to share disaster experiences and develop realistic action plans to rebuild communities that meet the needs and aspirations of young people.

The LBD network has grown with forums being held in Auckland (Pacific) and Sendai, Japan. In 2013 there will be forums in Indonesia and Kobe, Japan.

==== Concert ====
In 2012 the Volunteer Army Foundation created an initiative designed to lure youth into experiencing volunteer activity, based on RockCorps. On Saturday 3 November 2012, the foundation hosted a 10-hour music event at the new AMI Stadium in Addington, Christchurch. The only way to get a ticket was to volunteer at least four hours of time on any one of over 900 volunteer projects and events advertised through the custom built website. Over 8,000 tickets were sent out to individuals who contributed a total of over 50,000 hours of volunteering. 24 of New Zealand's best bands volunteered their time for the event, organised by Jonnie Halstead of Picnic Events.

The 50,000 hours of volunteering were contributed to Her Majesty the Queens's Diamond Jubilee project called the 'Jubilee Hour'. Johnson was invited to speak on behalf of the Volunteer Army Foundation at the House of Commons in London at the Official Celebration of the Jubilee Hour.
