= Carl Doy =

British-born New Zealand musician

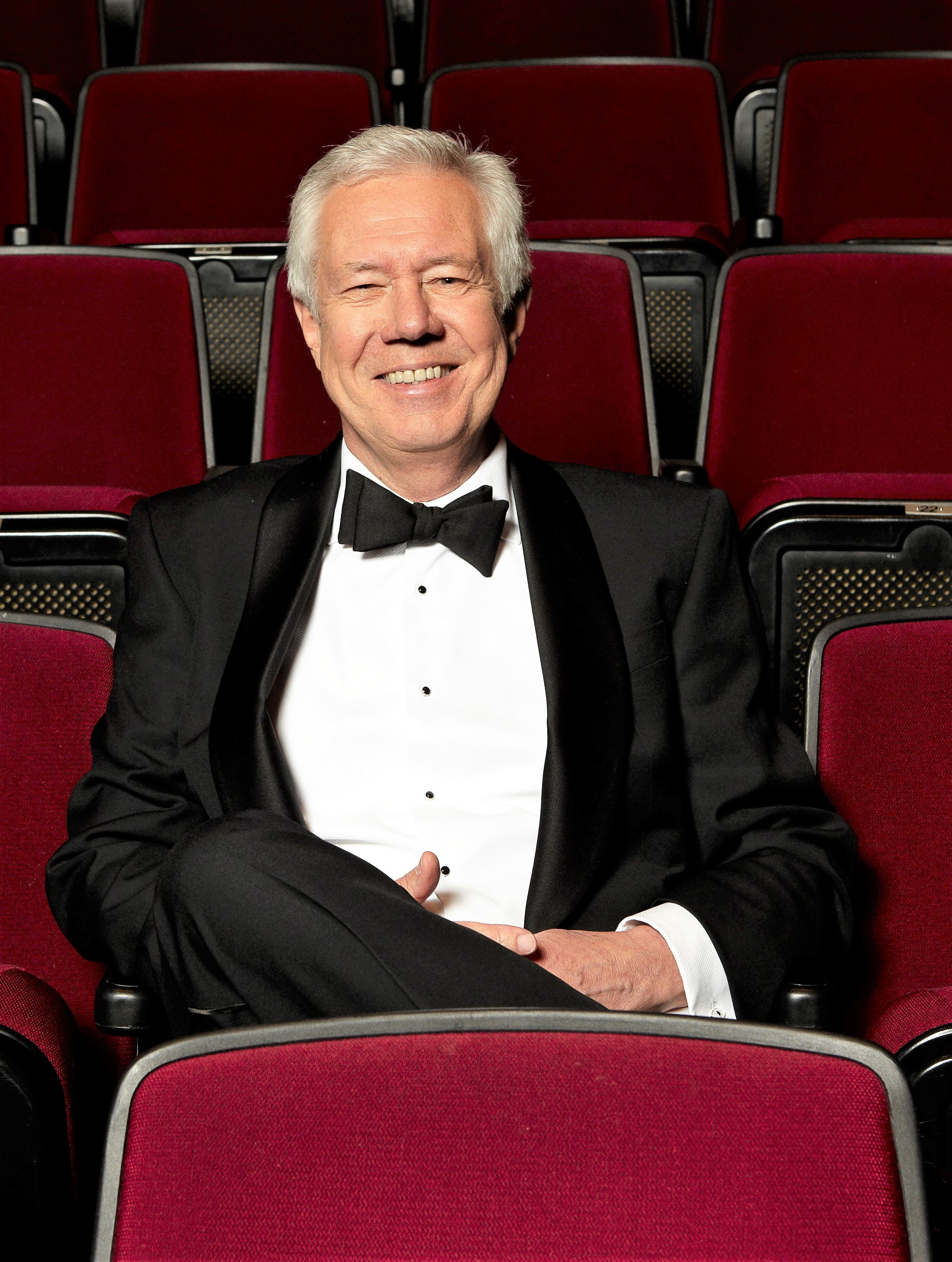
Carl Doy in 2017

Carl William Doy ONZM (born May 6, 1947) is a British-born New Zealand pianist, composer and arranger. One of New Zealand's most successful musicians, Doy is probably best known for his multi-platinum selling Piano By Candlelight albums.

== Life and career ==
Doy was born in Camberley, Surrey, England. He drew an interest in music as early as six years of age after he fell in love with his grandmother's piano. Although he did not have a formal music education at that time, he had a natural gift for playing by ear, which he then used to play popular songs of the day. It was only when he was in the Grammar School, his talents were identified by his music teachers who guided him to take the preliminary exams at the Royal College of Music. At 18 years of age, he won a scholarship to the Royal College of Music and studied piano, organ and composition there for two years.

In 1967, having achieved highest grades for theory in music, he joined the Arcadia cruise ship of P&O Cruises as its resident pianist. He spent the next few years playing between the cruise ship job and in UK clubs as well. In 1971, he was appointed the musical director aboard the Ocean Monarch cruise ship, which was one of the pioneers to have a full entertainment unit aboard.

After few years of work on cruise ships at sea, Doy decided to settle down to pursue his musical career in a different domain. That resulted in him moving to New Zealand in 1973 with his wife Kathy. He started work at Television New Zealand, where he got himself established quickly as a session pianist and arranger. That was the beginning of his career as a very popular writer and arranger of music for thousands of radio and television programs over the next decade or so. The most significant work at that time was the Royal Variety Performance for Queen Elizabeth II. He also arranged the Pope's Mass, which involved writing for two orchestras and a large voice choir. He had the opportunity to play and tour with a variety of visiting artists such as Shirley Bassey and The Seekers.

His immense success in the popular commercial music scene started in the late 1980s with the introduction of the best-selling Piano by Candlelight sequel. It all started when Doy met Auckland record producer Murray Thom at an Auckland hotel in 1987. Thom heard something he knew would be a winner; Doy playing different kind of lounge music in the foyer and the two got talking. Within months Doy's first Piano by Candlelight album was released. It was a big breakthrough for Doy and they decided to record an album with some popular music/songs in CD format. This was beginning of the ever popular Piano By Candlelight series, which made its entry to the NZ charts at number one in its first week. It was also one of the best selling albums ever by a NZ artist, selling in excess of one million copies in the US alone, and giving Carl the distinction of being the only New Zealand solo artist up until that time (1992) to have a certified platinum album in the US. The albums have also sold more than three million copies worldwide particularly in most European countries, the Far East, South America and Canada.

Eight more albums were recorded over the next twelve years under the same series. The second CD, named Piano By Candlelight 2, created a record in 1989 for most copies sold in New Zealand of a locally recorded album. Oprah Winfrey is one of his fans and his Together Collection was featured in her Favourite Things show in 2002 where she said "It is so fabulous, I think it's the best."

Dame Kiri Te Kanawa sang his arrangement of E te Tarakihi from Gisborne in the first live broadcast of the new millennium, to a worldwide television audience of over a hundred million people. Doy was also the music director/arranger of a series of CD albums created by another successful musician, NZ guitarist Martin Winch. One such album, "Espresso Guitar" released in 1998 has sold more than 100,000 copies in New Zealand alone.

In 1992, he received the Benny Award from the Variety Artists Club of New Zealand Inc, the highest honour available to a New Zealand variety entertainer.

Doy has completed five series of TVNZ's Dancing with the Stars. as its musical director.

In the 2009 Queen's Birthday Honours, Doy was appointed an Officer of the New Zealand Order of Merit, for services to music.

Doy is a patron of the National Youth Theatre Company of New Zealand (NYTC).

== Discography ==
=== Albums ===
Year	Title	Details	Peak chart positions		Certifications
Year	Title	Details	NZ	AUS	Certifications
1987	Piano by Candlelight	Label: CBS; Catalogue: 460487-1	3	13	NZ: Platinum
1989	Piano by Candlelight II		1	10	NZ: Platinum
1990	The Christmas Album		20	-	
1991	Piano by Candlelight III		2	-	NZ: Platinum
1993	Piano By Candlelight Collection		21	-	
1995	Night and Day		9	-	
1996	Piano By Moonlight: Shadow of Your Smile		5	-	
1997	In Loving Memory	Released: 23 December 1997; Label: Carl Doy	—	-	
2000	Piano By Candlelight: Entrée	Label: Sony	4	-	NZ: Gold
2002	Together	Label: Thom Music	—	-	
2003	Piano By Candlelight: The Music of Barbra Streisand	Label: Thom Music	—	-	
2008	Music for Wine Lovers	Released: 13 October 2008; Label: Thom Music	—	-	
2008	Music for Christmas Lovers	With the NZSO; Released: 13 October 2008; Label: Thom Music	—	-	
2009	The Very Best of Carl Doy	Released: 16 October 2009; Label: Thom Music/Sony	10	-	
2011	The Solo Album	Released: 19 January 2011; Label: Thom Music	—	-	
2011	East West	Released: 22 April 2011; Label: Thom Music	—	-	
2011	Lullaby: The International Love Language of Babies	With the NZSO; Released: 22 April 2011; Label: Thom Music	—	-	
2011	Hymns and Songs of Praise	Released: 1 September 2011; Label: Carl Doy	—	-	
2013	Songs of Love and War	Released: 12 April 2013; Label: Sony	19	-	
"—" denotes a recording that did not chart or was not released in that territory.
