= Shuchi Kothari =

New Zealand script writer and producer

Shuchi Kothari MNZM
- Kothari in 2026
- Born: India
- Education: University of Texas at Austin
- Occupations: Scriptwriter; producer; academic

Shuchi Tarun Kothari MNZM is a New Zealand-based Indian scriptwriter and producer. Born in Ahmedabad, Kothari studied writing at the University of Texas before moving to New Zealand in 1997. She is the co-writer of the film Firaaq.

== Filmography ==
=== Writer ===
- Firaaq
- A Thousand Apologies
- Coffee and Allah
- Apron Strings

=== Producer ===
- A Thousand Apologies
- Coffee and Allah
- Eeling

=== Actress ===
- A Thousand Apologies

== Honours and awards ==
- 2008 Hawaii International Film Festival: Best Short Film: Coffee and Allah
- 2008 ‘Golden Minbar’ International Festival of Muslim Cinema (Russia): Best Short Film: Coffee and Allah
- 2010 Filmfare Awards (India): Critics’ Award for Best Film: Firaaq
- 2022 Women in Film and Television New Zealand Awards: Great Southern Film & Television Award for Outstanding Contribution to the New Zealand Screen Industry

In the 2026 King’s Birthday Honours, Kothari was appointed a Member of the New Zealand Order of Merit, for services to the screen industry.

== Non-Fiction ==
- "Screen Diversity" in The Women Writers Handbook, Aurora Metro Books, 2020.
