= Caroline Crowther =

Obstetrician and gynecologist in New Zealand

Caroline Crowther CNZM
- Crowther in 2026

Caroline Anne Crowther CNZM is an Australian/New Zealand medical researcher specialising in maternity and child health. She is associated with both the University of Auckland and the University of Adelaide, being a professor at each institution. Crowther has been the recipient of multiple medical research grants.

In 2019, Crowther was elected a Fellow of the Royal Society of New Zealand.

In 2025, Crowther was awarded the Gluckman Medal for research excellence in the health sciences.

In the 2026 King’s Birthday Honours, Crowther was appointed a Companion of the New Zealand Order of Merit, for services to maternal and perinatal health.

== Selected works ==
- Crowther, Caroline A., Janet E. Hiller, John R. Moss, Andrew J. McPhee, William S. Jeffries, and Jeffrey S. Robinson. "Effect of treatment of gestational diabetes mellitus on pregnancy outcomes." New England Journal of Medicine 352, no. 24 (2005): 2477–2486.
- Doyle, Lex W., Caroline A. Crowther, Philippa Middleton, Stephane Marret, and Dwight Rouse. "Magnesium sulphate for women at risk of preterm birth for neuroprotection of the fetus." The Cochrane Library (2009).
- Rumbold, Alice R., Caroline A. Crowther, Ross R. Haslam, Gustaaf A. Dekker, and Jeffrey S. Robinson. "Vitamins C and E and the risks of preeclampsia and perinatal complications." New England Journal of Medicine 354, no. 17 (2006): 1796–1806.
- Smith, Caroline A., Carmel T. Collins, Allan M. Cyna, and Caroline A. Crowther. "Complementary and alternative therapies for pain management in labour." The Cochrane Library (2006).
- Gülmezoglu, A. M., C. A. Crowther, P. Middleton, and E. Heatley. "Induction of labour for improving birth outcomes for women at or beyond term." Cochrane Database of Systematic Reviews 6 (2004).
- Crowther, Caroline A., Janet E. Hiller, Lex W. Doyle, and Ross R. Haslam. "Effect of magnesium sulfate given for neuroprotection before preterm birth: a randomized controlled trial." JAMA 290, no. 20 (2003): 2669–2676.
- Crowther, Caroline A., and J. Harding. "Repeat doses of prenatal corticosteroids for women at risk of preterm birth for preventing neonatal respiratory disease." The Cochrane Library (2000).
- Crowther, Caroline A., Ross R. Haslam, Janet E. Hiller, Lex W. Doyle, Jeffrey S. Robinson, and Australasian Collaborative Trial of Repeat Doses of Steroids (ACTORDS) Study Group. "Neonatal respiratory distress syndrome after repeat exposure to antenatal corticosteroids: a randomised controlled trial." The Lancet 367, no. 9526 (2006): 1913–1919.
