= Hilary Souter =

New Zealand advertising industry executive

Hilary Souter CNZM

Chief executive of the Advertising Standards Authority
- Incumbent
- Assumed office 2005
- Preceded by: Glen Wiggs

Personal details
- Citizenship: New Zealand
- Education: Victoria University of Wellington

Hilary Anne Souter CNZM is a New Zealand media executive. She has worked in the media industry since the mid 1990s, and has been chief executive of the Advertising Standards Authority since 2005. In 2026, she was appointed a Companion of the New Zealand Order of Merit, for services to the advertising industry.

== Early life ==
Souter studied at Victoria University of Wellington, graduating with a Bachelor of Arts degree in 1990.

== Career ==
After leaving university, Souter worked as a parliamentary officer in the Office of the Clerk of the House of Representatives, where her duties including acting as clerk to the Planning and Development Select Committee.

Subsequently, Souter has worked in the media industry for more than 30 years. She has been the chief executive of the New Zealand Advertising Standards Authority since 2005. She led work to develop the Advertising Standards Code and oversaw the Advertising Codes of Practice.

Souter was vice-president of the International Council for Ad Self-Regulation, and was elected president in 2025. She is a member of Victoria University of Wellington’s School of Marketing and International Business industry advisory group, and a guest lecturer.

== Recognition ==
In the 2026 King's Birthday Honours, Souter was appointed a Companion of the New Zealand Order of Merit, for services to the advertising industry.
