= Joan Rosier-Jones =

New Zealand playwright, writer and teacher

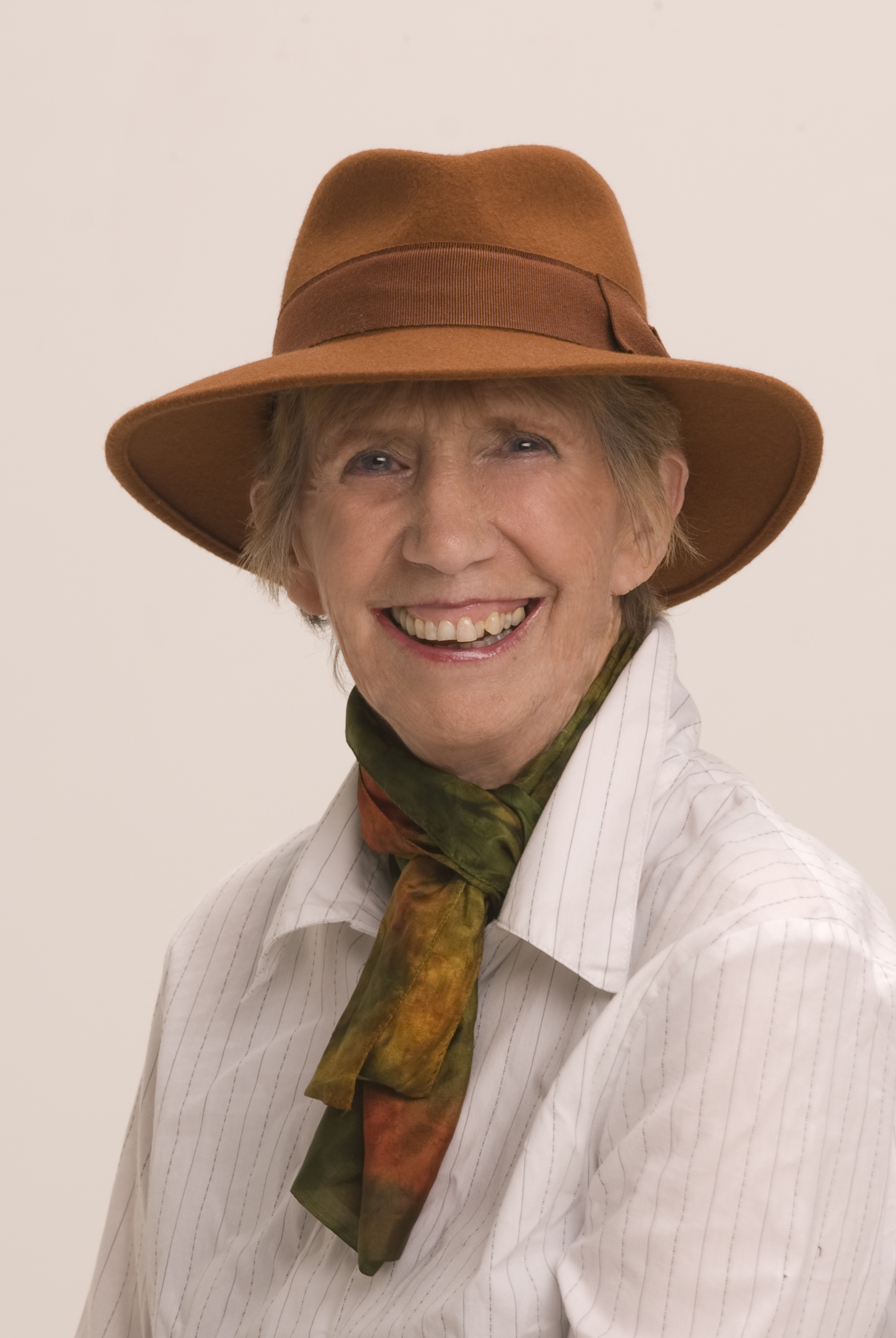
Joan Rosier-Jones

Joan Mary Rosier-Jones MNZM (born 27 December 1940 in Christchurch) is a New Zealand novelist, playwright, short story writer and nonfiction writer, and teacher. She completed a Teacher's- A Certificate in Christchurch Teachers' College in 1958–59 and a Bachelor of Arts majoring in history and English.

== Career and family life ==
Rosier-Jones has been a primary teacher and later taught creative writing to adults. She has written writing courses for the New Zealand Institute of Business Studies and supported up-and-coming New Zealand writers. Rosier-Jones was president of New Zealand Society of Authors (PEN New Zealand Inc.), the New Zealand writers' "union" and NZ PEN, from 1999 to 2001. She has lived in London, Wellington, and Auckland for 30 years and currently resides with her husband Fergus in Whanganui, a river city in the North Island of New Zealand. She has one son and one daughter. A passionate advocate of New Zealand writing she has published several how to do books about writing. She has also contributed articles to "Metro," "Next" and "New Zealand Author."

== Novels ==
In 1985, Rosier-Jones published her first novel, Cast two Shadows. The novel is set during the 1978 Bastion Point land protest. In 1986, she was awarded a Literary Fund's Writers' Bursary $10,000, which allowed her to work full-time on her second novel Voyagers. New Zealand writer Fiona Kidman described it as a novel "marked by prodigious and impressive research ... immensely satisfying and thought-provoking." 1990, she published Canterbury Tales, which looks into the lives of a group of travellers on a South Island train. "The allegory of Chaucer's masterpiece is obvious but that does not detract from this book being an entertaining and well constructed read-indeed it probably adds to it.( Daily Telegraph), Her third novel Mother Tongue (1996) is set in an imagined future where a Maori dictatorship is ruling New Zealand. Crossing the Alps ( 2012) the protagonist Hannah Francis, born of an American father and New Zealand-Irish mother, has been brought up in New York by her father and grandmother. Now an adult, she is on her way back to New Zealand to enter a rehab centre to deal with her alcoholism. Waiting for Elizabeth (2013) is set in Ireland 1565. It features 'Old English' Thomas Butler, Earl of Ormond, is waiting for his Queen, Elizabeth and is a story, of romance and political intrigue.

== Play ==
In the mid eighties, Rosier-Jones wrote a play "The Stars go Down" which was performed at Auckland University's The Kenneth Maidment Theatre, Wanganui Repertory Company and off-Broadway in New York.

== Non-fiction ==
In The Murder of Chow Yat, 2009 Market Gardener, Chow Yat, who lived on the outskirts of Wanganui in post-WWI New Zealand. On 31 May 1922 this Chinese market-garden worker was shot four times."Joan Rosier-Jones ... creates a vivid picture with detailed and insightful chapters addressing 1920s Wanganui, Chow Yat’s early life, incidents on the day, evening of, and day after the murder, the police investigation, suspects, aftermath, and ongoing uncertainty. Her sparse writing style allows space to absorb, ponder and speculate – not only in terms of the whodunnit aspect, but also wider issues such as historic xenophobia, faulty eye-witness descriptions, family secrets, and the police tendency to focus on building a case against one suspect to the detriment of other options... "

Writing your family History (1997 updated 2005) contains information on the subject of researching and writing your family history. "... is a practical, sensible and explicit "how-to" book for New Zealanders ..." So you want to Write (2000) shares Joan Rosier-Jones knowledge and depth of experience in the act of writing. Based on her successful creative writing teaching, the book covers a wide range of subjects.

== Honours and awards ==
Rosier-Jones (left), after her investiture as a Member of the New Zealand Order of Merit by the governor-general, Dame Cindy Kiro, at Government House, Wellington, on 15 September 2026

In the 2026 King’s Birthday Honours, Rosier-Jones was appointed a Member of the New Zealand Order of Merit, for services to writing and education.

== List of books ==
- Cast two Shadows, 1985, Hodder & Stoughton Auckland ISBN 978-0340379547
- Voyagers, 1987, Hodder & Stoughton, Auckland. ISBN 9780340416396
- Canterbury Tales, 1990, Hodder & Stoughton ISBN 978-0340519752
- Mother Tongue, 1996, David Ling Publishing, Auckland ISBN 9780908990320
- Writing Your Family History, 1997, Tandem Press, Auckland ISBN 9781869416751
- So You Want to Write, 2000, Tandem Press, Auckland ISBN 9781877178702
- Yes, 2000, David Ling Publishing ISBN 978-0908990719
- New Zealand Children's Literature (with Annie Shih, joint Mandarin & English collection of pieces written for the Mandarin Daily) 2003, Shanghai, ISBN 9789862211748
- The Murder of Chow Yat, 2009, Stead & Daughters, Wanganui ISBN 9780986453717
- Crossing the Alps, 2012, Bluewood Publishing, Christchurch ISBN 9781927134917
- Waiting For Elizabeth, 2013, Tangerine Publications, Wanganui ISBN 9780987664617
- Sunset at the Estuary, 2015, ed. with Dorothy Alexander, Rangitawa, Feilding ISBN 9780994120120
