= Sam Johnson (activist) =

New Zealand activist (born 1989)

Sam Johnson ONZM
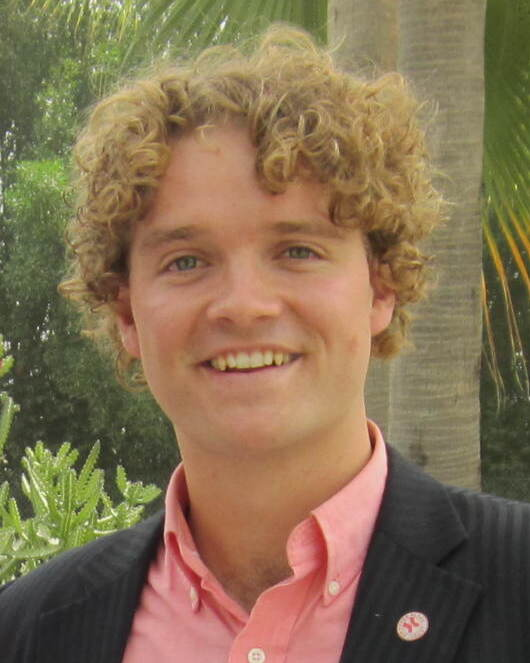
- Johnson in 2013
- Citizenship: New Zealand
- Education: University of Canterbury
- Spouse: Tyler Brummer
- Children: 1

Samuel Robert Johnson ONZM (born 14 February 1989) is a social entrepreneur from Christchurch, New Zealand. He founded the Student Volunteer Army, an organisation that mobilised 11,000 students to assist the cleanup following the Christchurch earthquakes and has continued as a nationwide volunteering movement.

== Education and career ==
Johnson is from rural Canterbury and was educated at Christ's College and the University of Canterbury in New Zealand. Johnson graduated from the University of Canterbury with a BA in Politics and Community Engagement in 2015.

=== Student Volunteer Army ===
Following the 2010 and 2011 earthquakes, Johnson founded the Student Volunteer Army to assist residents with the clean up of liquefaction caused by the earthquakes. The Student Volunteer Army was managed by a core team of 15 people and a wider administration of 70 people who managed the three core operations which the SVA focused on: battalions, squadrons and street teams. There were 13,000 students volunteering per week.

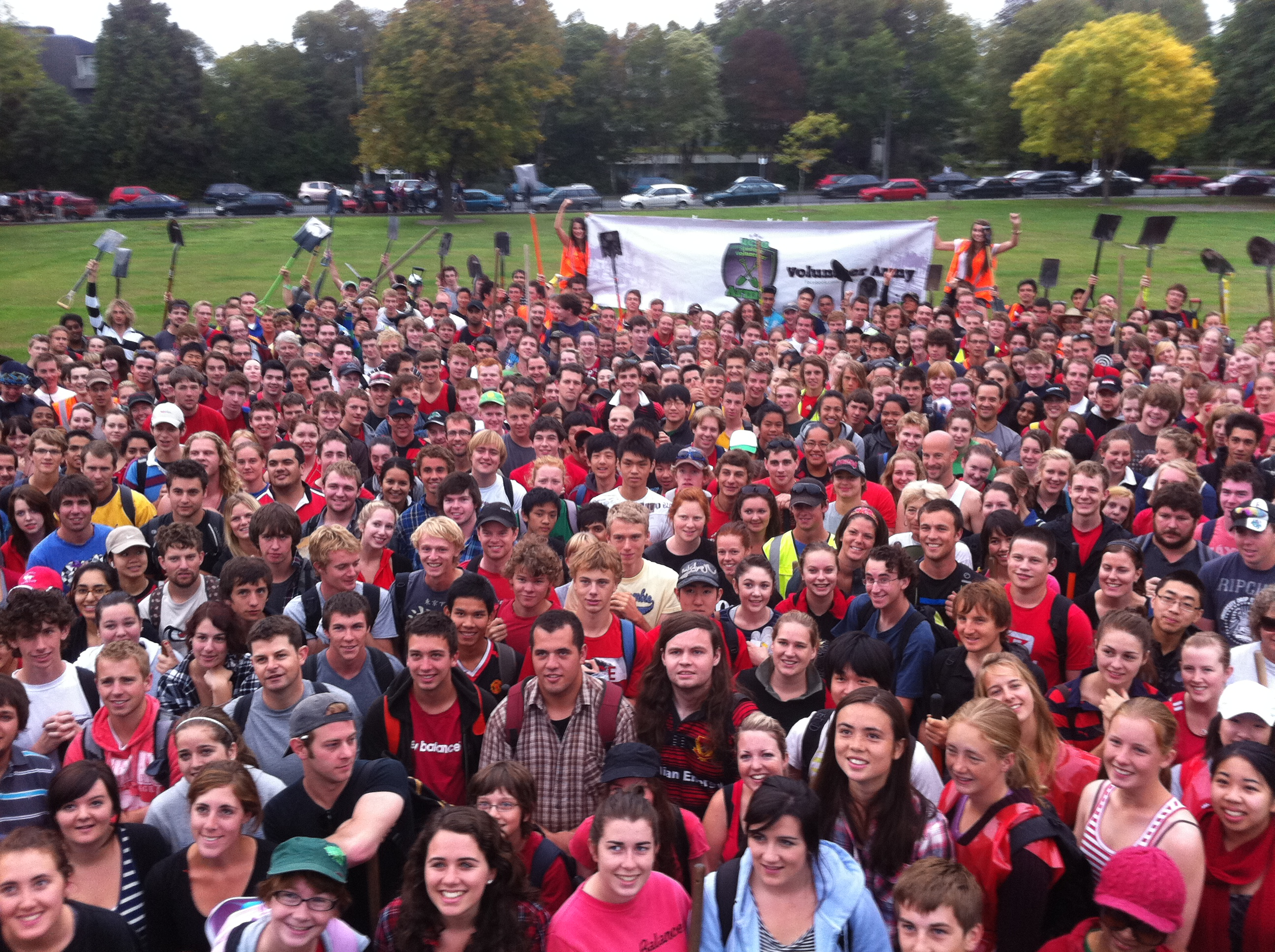
StudentArmy IlamSchool in March 2011

=== Disaster response and preparedness ===
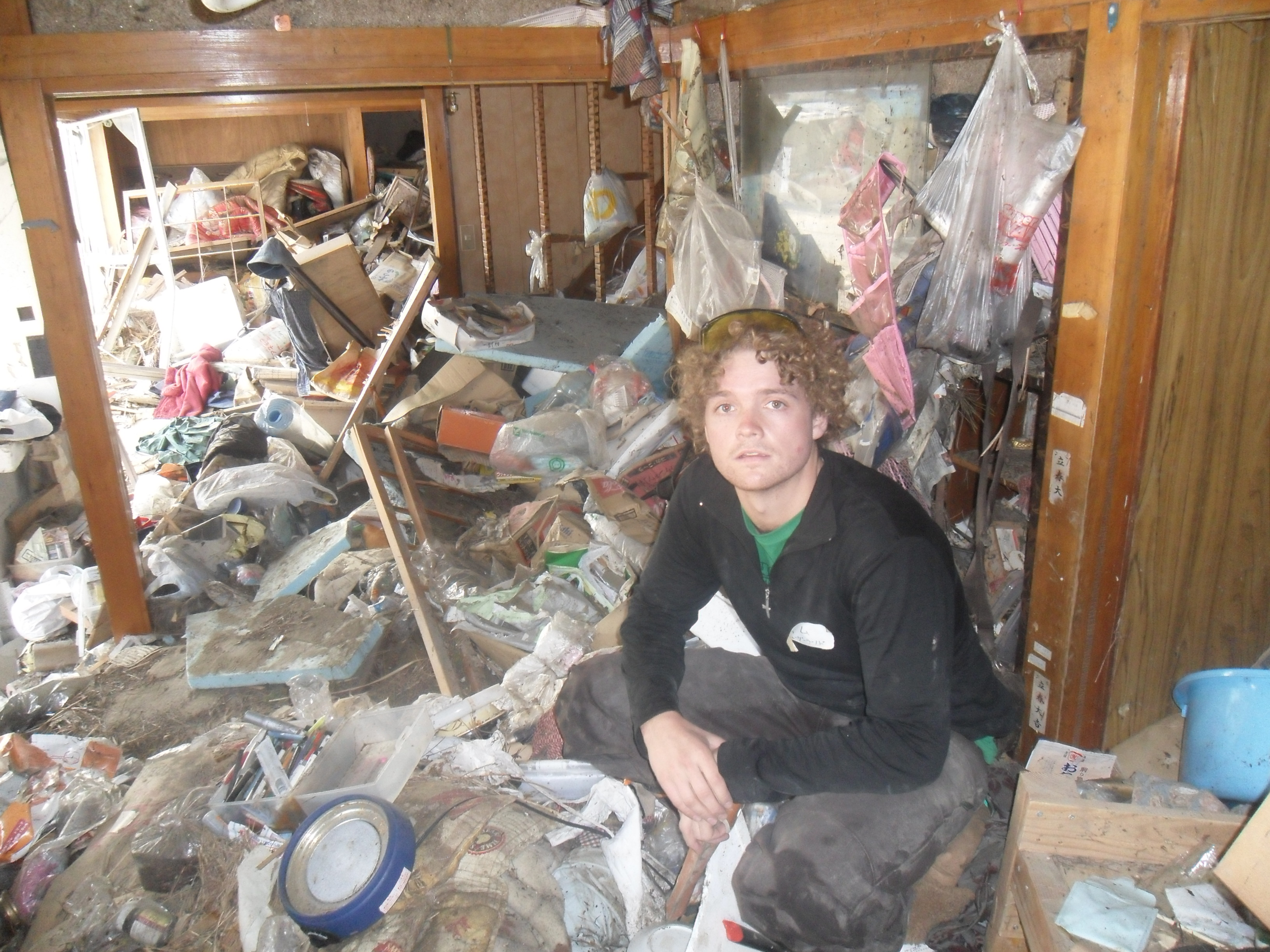
Johnson in a tsunami stricken home in Japan

In late April and early May 2011, Johnson spent two weeks in Japan following the Tōhoku earthquake and tsunami to set up a Student Volunteer Army at Waseda University.

Johnson worked to assist mobilising young Nepalese volunteers following the Nepal earthquakes in 2015.

Johnson and the Student Volunteer Army worked with other young people alongside the UNISDR in preparation for 3rd World Conference on Disaster Risk Reduction.

=== Local leadership and politics ===
Johnson successfully stood for the Riccarton-Wigram Community Board of the Christchurch City Council in the October 2010 local body elections. At the time, he was endorsed by Prime Minister John Key for his election campaign.

Johnson declared in July 2011 that he had no intention to run for higher public office in the near future. In January 2013, it was reported that he may consider running for Christchurch City Council in the October 2013 local body elections. The Press reported on 20 April 2013 that Lianne Dalziel would challenge Bob Parker for the Christchurch mayoralty, and that she had asked Johnson to be her running mate, with a view of Johnson becoming deputy mayor. Johnson eventually decided against running, saying it wasn't the "right thing for me right now".

Johnson is a founding Trustee of the Ministry of Awesome, a Christchurch-based idea incubator.

=== Social enterprise and business ===
In 2016, Johnson launched a social enterprise focused on social isolation in New Zealand, which then joined forces with technology platform Mycare to improve the New Zealand care and support sector.

== Awards and celebrities ==
Johnson has received a Special Leadership Award from the Sir Peter Blake Trust and was named Young New Zealander of the Year and Public Relations Institute of New Zealand (PRINZ) Communicator of the Year in 2012.

Johnson and the Student Volunteer Army have hosted many international icons and celebrities who visit Christchurch including several members of the British Royal Family, the 14th Dalai Lama of Tibet and organisers of the Never Again MSD gun control campaign.

In the 2026 King’s Birthday Honours, Johnson was appointed an Officer of the New Zealand Order of Merit, for services to the community and youth.

== Personal life ==
Johnson is gay and married to husband Tyler Brummer. The couple live in Auckland. In 2022, they announced that they were looking for a surrogate in order to have a child. Their child was born in 2024.
