= Gillian Dobbie =

New Zealand computer scientist

Gillian Dobbie FRSNZ
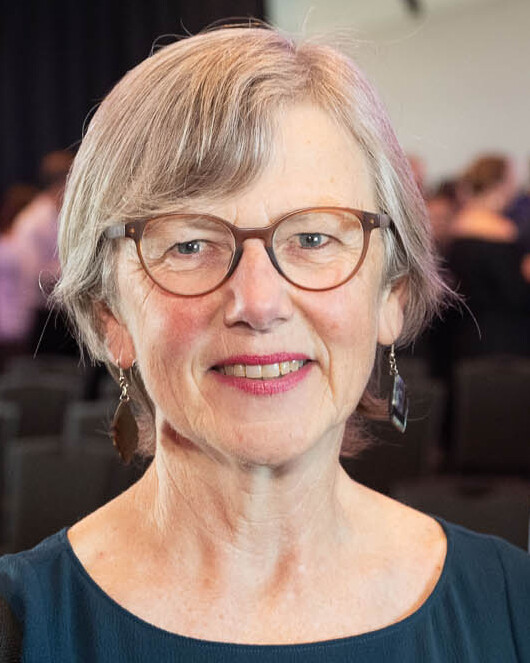
- Dobbie in 2024
- Education: Massey University; University of Melbourne
- Awards: Fellow of the Royal Society of New Zealand
- Scientific career
- Fields: Computer science
- Workplaces: University of Auckland

Gillian Christine Dobbie FRSNZ is a New Zealand computer scientist. She is a professor at the University of Auckland and the Director of the Auckland ICT Graduate School. She is also a visiting professor at National University of Singapore and on the advisory board of the Victoria University of Wellington.

== Life and work ==
Dobbie has a master's degree from Massey University, completed in 1987 with a dissertation titled, Design of a monitor for the debugging and development of multiprocessing process control systems.

Her main research interests are big data, stream data mining, keyword queries, data management, and software engineering. She convenes the Mathematical and Information Sciences panel for the Marsden Fund of the New Zealand Royal Society.

Dobbie's research centers on machine learning, including data stream mining and adversarial attacks. The research group that she heads creates algorithms to be used in several application areas, such as "predicting peaks and troughs in COVID-19 cases, predicting dementia using routinely collected data, monitoring critical and/or remote sensors, and detecting and defending against various adversarial attacks."

She says she is "keen to work with people who have a tricky problem they would like to solve using machine learning."

In 2022, Dobbie was elected a Fellow of the Royal Society of New Zealand.

== Selected works ==
- Wan, Jacky W. W.; Dobbie, Gillian (2003). "Extracting association rules from XML documents using XQuery". Proceedings of the 5th ACM international workshop on Web information and data management. pp. 94–97. doi:10.1145/956699.956720. ISBN 1-58113-725-7.
- Alam, Shafiq; Dobbie, Gillian; Koh, Yun Sing; Riddle, Patricia; Ur Rehman, Saeed (2014). "Research on particle swarm optimization based clustering: A systematic review of literature and techniques". Swarm and Evolutionary Computation. 17: 1–13. doi:10.1016/j.swevo.2014.02.001.
