= Advertising Standards Authority (New Zealand) =

- Abbreviation: ASA
- Location: Wellington
- Region served: New Zealand
- Chief Executive: Hilary Souter
- Budget: $800,000
- Staff: 5
- Website: www.asa.co.nz

The Advertising Standards Authority (ASA) is an organisation that investigates breaches of advertising standards in New Zealand. The ASA provides a free complaints process for consumers about the content and placement of advertisements. In assessing complaints, the ASA apply the ASA Advertising Codes. Key requirements of these codes include truthful presentation and a sense of social responsibility. If a complaint is upheld, the ASA formally request the advertisement is removed or amended. Decisions are released to the media and the public via email and online.

== History ==
The ASA began when the Committee of Advertising Practice (CAP) was established in 1973 by the Newspaper Publishers Association, the NZ Broadcasting Commission and the Accredited Advertising Agencies Association. In 1974 it released the first Advertising Codes - focusing at first on advertisements related to weight loss, alcohol, and automobiles.

In 1990, the name was changed from the CAP to the Advertising Standards Authority and it was incorporated as a self-regulatory body. It now has 14 member organisations representing advertisers, agencies and the media.

In 2008, there was a total of $2.3 billion spent on advertising in New Zealand. These advertisements attracted 671 complaints to the ASA with 153 being upheld or settled. Of the remainder 140 were not upheld, 317 were judged as lacking grounds to proceed and 61 were withdrawn.

By 2023, the number of complaints had grown to over 1000 per year, and the compliance rate for decisions handed down by the Authority had increased to 99%.

There are now six codes enforced by the Authority, governing advertising related to Alcohol, Children, Finance, Food and Beverages, Gambling and Therapeutic Products and Services. The Authority enforces these code across platforms and media types.

== ASA Objectives ==
The three main objectives are:

- To seek to maintain at all times and in all media a proper and generally acceptable standard of advertising and to ensure that advertising is not misleading or deceptive, either by statement or by implication.
- To establish and promote an effective system of voluntary self-regulation in respect to advertising standards.
- To establish and fund an Advertising Standards Complaints Board.

== Controversies ==
The Department of Internal Affairs took television broadcasters and the Authority to task in 2023 over what it sees as advertising promoting illegal offshore gambling. A spokesperson for the Authority said that they were not responsible for interpreting or enforcing the law, but only with assessing of advertising breaches the codes of compliance - which the authority argues the ads themselves do not.

== Advertising Standards Complaints and Appeal Board ==
The Advertising Standards Complaints Board (ASCB) is a nine-member board, with five public members and four industry members. The ASCB addresses complaints made by members of the public against ASA Advertising Codes.

Public Members
Name	Position	
Raewyn Anderson	Public Member and Chair	
Colin Magee	Public Member and Deputy Chair	
Lachlan Grimwade	Public Member	
Everard Halbert	Public Member	
Aaron Hape	Public Member	
Marj Noble	Public Member	
Diana Roy	Public Member	
Industry Members
Name	Member Type	Organisation
Russell Duncan	Advertiser	Land Information New Zealand
Grant Maxwell	Advertiser	EightyOne
Abi Skelton	Advertiser	Saatchi & Saatchi
Jessica Wallace	Advertiser	The Co-operative Bank
Parris Downey	Media	Go Media
Andrea Fasching	Media	TVNZ
Nicole Jones	Media	Discovery, Inc.
Daniel Kebbell	Media	Trade Me
Katrina Reinsfield	Media	Stuff

The Advertising Standards Complaints Appeal Board (ASCAB) is a three-member Board that addresses appealed ASCB complaints.

Public Members
Name	Position
Nanette Moreau	Chair and Public Member
Susan Taylor	Public Member
Margaret McKee	Alternate Public Member
Industry Members
Name	Position
Paul Elenio	Industry Member
Nigel Keats	Alternate Industry Member
