= 2026 Birthday Honours (New Zealand) =

Awards list for New Zealand

2026 King's Birthday Honours
- Previous: 2026 New Year Honours
- Type: New Zealand royal honours: New Zealand Order of Merit; King's Service Order; King's Service Medal; New Zealand Antarctic Medal; Distinguished Service Decoration
- Date: 1 June 2026
- Country: New Zealand
- Total recipients: 178

The 2026 King's Birthday Honours in New Zealand, celebrating the official birthday of King Charles III, were appointments made by the King in his right as King of New Zealand, on the advice of the New Zealand government, to various orders and honours to reward and highlight good works by New Zealanders. The honours were announced on 1 June 2026.

The recipients of honours are listed here as they were styled before their new honour.

== New Zealand Order of Merit ==
=== Dame Companion (DNZM) ===
- Susan Jean Hassall ONZM JP – of Cambridge. For services to education.
- Professor Elizabeth Mary Rata – of Auckland. For services to education.
Dame Susan Hassall

Dame Elizabeth Rata

=== Knight Companion (KNZM) ===
- Dr Paul Andrew Baker – of Auckland. For services to health.
- Peter Francis Boshier – of Wellington. For services to the State and the judiciary.
- Professor James William Chapman – of Palmerston North. For services to literacy education.
- David Charles Ellis CNZM – of Ngāruawāhia. For services to the Thoroughbred industry and philanthropy.
Sir Paul Baker

Sir Peter Boshier

Sir James Chapman

Sir David Ellis

=== Companion (CNZM) ===
- Dr Reuben Tūwhakahekeao Collier MNZM – of Rotorua. For services to Māori and education.
- Professor Caroline Anne Crowther – of Auckland. For services to maternal and perinatal health.
- Dr James Alfred Farmer KC – of Auckland. For services to the law.
- Beatrice Roini Liua Faumuina ONZM – of Auckland. For services to sport and governance.
- Emeritus Professor Pare Areta Keiha QSO – of Auckland. For services to Māori and education.
- Riki Henare Manuel – of Christchurch. For services to Māori art.
- Bryan William Mogridge ONZM – of Waiheke Island. For services to children's health, governance and philanthropy.
- Chloe Smith – of Auckland. For services to the screen industry.
- Hilary Anne Souter – of Wellington. For services to the advertising industry.
- Peter John Thompson – of Auckland. For services to philanthropy and rugby.
Reuben Collier

Caroline Crowther

James Farmer

Beatrice Faumuina

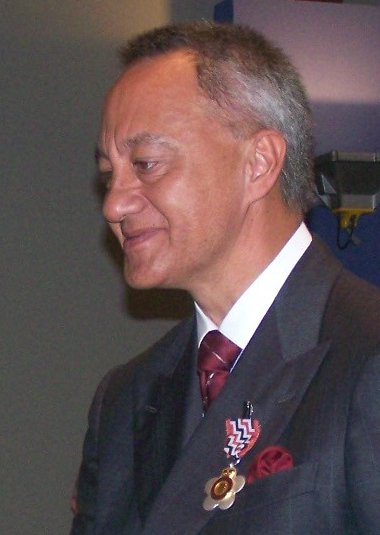
Pare Keiha

Riki Manuel

Bryan Mogridge

Chloe Smith

Peter Thompson

=== Officer (ONZM) ===
- Douglas Seymour Alderslade – of Auckland. For services to the racing industry.
- Richard Walter Ashford – of Ashburton. For services to business, particularly the textile craft industry.
- Associate Professor Nicola Cecile Austin – of Christchurch. For services to children's health.
- Ronelle Kiterangi Baker – of One Tree Point. For services to children and people living with disabilities.
- Suzannah Wilson Bates – of Auckland. For services to cricket and basketball.
- Dr Ronald Alan Beatson – of Motueka. For services to horticulture.
- Evan Welch Davies – of Auckland. For services to business and governance.
- Margaret Ruth Davy – of Auckland. For services to nursing and women's health.
- Karleen Mae Everitt – of Haruru. For services to Māori and business.
- Inspector Ross Grantham – of Palmerston North. For services to the New Zealand Police.
- Dr Te Ripowai Pauline Higgins QSM – of Lower Hutt. For services to education and Māori.
- Jennifer Margaret Hughey – of Christchurch. For services to community law and governance.
- Trevor David Janes – of Auckland. For services to business and public sector governance.
- Adrienne Anne Jansen – of Porirua. For services to writing and publishing.
- Samuel Robert Johnson – of Auckland. For services to the community and youth.
- Dr Michael Brian Johnston – of Wellington. For services to education.
- Rauru Kirikiri – of Wellington. For services to Māori, science and conservation.
- Earle Weston Kirton – of Upper Hutt. For services to rugby.
- Dr Yvonne Marie LeFort – of Auckland. For services to breastfeeding medicine.
- Russell George Lowe – of Te Puke. For services to horticulture and the kiwifruit industry.
- Geoffrey John Maber – of Hamilton. For services to agribusiness.
- Garry John Macdonald – of Auckland. For services to wastewater engineering.
- Dr Colin David Mantell – of Wānaka. For services to health education, obstetrics and gynaecology.
- Susan Louise Nolan – of Auckland. For services to drug testing and forensic toxicology.
- Scott O'Donnell – of Invercargill. For services to business.
- Stephen John Parker – of Albany. For services to governance and the community.
- Baye Michael Riddell – of Tokomaru Bay. For services to Māori clay art.
- Rahera Shortland MNZM – of Kerikeri. For services to Māori language education.
- Ann Robyn Smaill – of Arrowtown. For services to speech–language therapy.
- Barry John Soper – of Auckland. For services to journalism.
- Archna Tandon JP – of Lincoln. For services to ethnic communities and women.
- Hamish John Logan Taverner – of Palmerston North. For services to people with learning disabilities.
- Murray Neville Thom – of Auckland. For services to the arts and philanthropy.
- Sandra (Sandy) Dawn Thompson – of Auckland. For services to governance, education and children.
- Dr Leslie Gail Van Gelder – of Glenorchy. For services to conservation and dark sky sanctuaries.
- Kenneth Ivan Williamson QSM KStJ JP – of Hamilton. For services to governance and the community.
- Sharon Mary Williamson – of Auckland. For services to hockey.
- Rodney Jack Wong – of Palmerston North. For services to business and the community.
- Dr Keith Bernard Woodford – of Lincoln. For services to agriculture and agribusiness.
Doug Alderslade

Richard Ashford

Nicola Austin

Ronelle Baker

Suzie Bates

Ron Beatson

Evan Davies

Ruth Davy

Karleen Everitt

Ross Grantham

Te Ripowai Higgins

Jenny Hughey

Trevor Janes

Adrienne Jansen

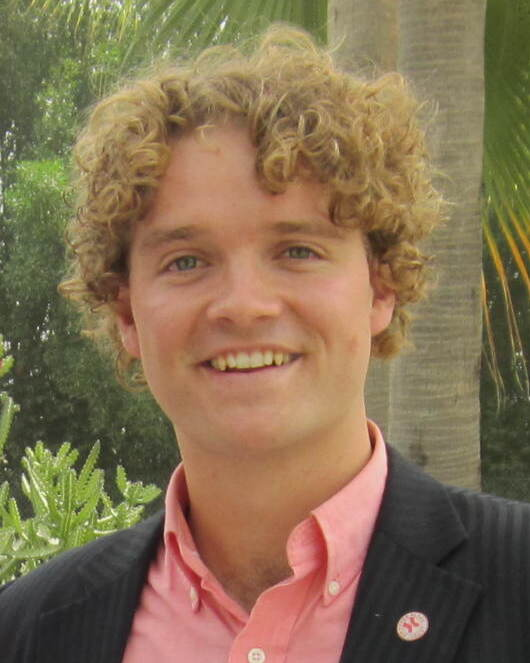
Sam Johnson

Michael Johnston

Rauru Kirikiri

Earle Kirton

Yvonne LeFort

Russell Lowe

Geoffrey Maber

Garry Macdonald

Sue Nolan

Scott O'Donnell

Stephen Parker

Baye Riddell

Rahera Shortland

Ann Smaill

Barry Soper

Archna Tandon

Hamish Taverner

Murray Thom

Sandy Thompson

Leslie Van Gelder

Ken Williamson

Sharon Williamson

Rodney Wong

Keith Woodford

=== Member (MNZM) ===
- Emeritus Professor Peter Vaughan Adams – of Dunedin. For services to music and music education.
- Lemalu Freddie Ah Kuoi – of Kaikohe. For services to rugby league and the community.
- Dr Lesley Ansell – of Auckland. For services to midwifery.
- Emeritus Professor Gilbert Olivier Barbezat – of Dunedin. For services to gastroenterology.
- Barbara Beable – of Wānaka. For services to athletics.
- Dr Michael Edward Beable – of Wānaka. For services to athletics.
- Wayne Lindsay Bradshaw – of Havelock North. For services to senior citizens and the community.
- Professor Sharon Mary Brownie – of Te Kamo. For services to health and nursing education.
- Daniel Gerard Buckingham – of Auckland. For services to people with disabilities and wheelchair rugby.
- Elizabeth (Irihapeti) Jane Bullmore – of Christchurch. For services to seniors' health, particularly Māori.
- Dr Luk Sun Chin – of Cambridge. For services to health and harness racing.
- Dr Paul John Davidson – of Blenheim. For services to documentary filmmaking.
- Gary William Diprose – of Warkworth. For services to youth.
- Professor Richard George Douglas – of Auckland. For services to rhinology.
- Mervyn Gerard English – of Invercargill. For services to governance and the community.
- Okesene Seanoa Faraimo – of Porirua. For services to the community, Tokelau language and culture.
- Mark David Fisher – of Auckland. For services to sexual health, particularly people living with HIV.
- John Flowers – of New Plymouth. For services to the community.
- Kendall Maree Flutey – of Christchurch. For services to business and financial literacy.
- Dr Mark Robert Fraundorfer – of Mount Maunganui. For services to health, particularly men's health.
- Patrick George John Gale – of Auckland. For services to education.
- Sumati Govind – of Lower Hutt. For services to governance and the community.
- Dr Rachael Wendy Griffiths-Hughes – of Hamilton. For services to music.
- Colin Joseph Ronald Groves – of Hamilton. For services to business, philanthropy and sport.
- Joseph Simon Hollander JP – of Palmerston North. For services to the construction industry and the community.
- Michael lan Joseph Kawana – of Masterton. For services to Māori and the community.
- Fane Fusipongi Ketu'u JP – of Auckland. For services to Tongan language education.
- Lisa Helen Kingi – of Auckland. For services to rugby, particularly player welfare.
- Dr Shuchi Tarun Kothari – of Auckland. For services to the screen industry.
- Janice Kuka – of Tauranga. For services to Māori health.
- Vicky Maree Lassen – of Havelock North. For services to netball and life saving.
- Dr Miles Richard James Lattimer-Gregory – of North Walsham, United Kingdom. For services to theatre.
- Elizabeth Anne Lee – of Auckland. For services to refugees, migrants and education.
- Inspector Neru Grant Leifi – of Christchurch. For services to the New Zealand Police and the community.
- Douglas MacGregor Lind – of Cromwell. For services to conservation and Search and Rescue.
- Filomena (Talaleomalie Mena) Loheni – of Auckland. For services to Pacific fashion.
- Associate Professor Chai Hop Mary Low – of Hamilton. For services to accountancy education.
- Shirley Anne Mackay – of Auckland. For services to swimming.
- Elizabeth Jane Maire – of Whangaparāoa. For services to conservation and education.
- Terese Karen Marr – of Pukekohe. For services to ADHD support and philanthropy.
- Alison Mary McDonald – of Ōtaki. For services to translation and interpretation services.
- Alan Stuart McIntyre JP – of Auckland. For services to education.
- Bruce McLachlan – of Ruakākā. For services to education.
- Group Captain Andrew John McWilliam AFC AE – of Hamilton. For services to the New Zealand Defence Force.
- Terence Reginald Joseph Nicholas – of Winton. For services to Māori and governance.
- Charles Robert Norrish – of Rangiora. For services to education.
- Tofa Robertina O'Halloran – of Auckland. For services to education and the Niuean community.
- Leota Pauga Esitone Pauga – of Auckland. For services to Fire and Emergency New Zealand.
- Morris Charles Pita – of Auckland. For services to governance, business and Māori.
- Michele Margot Poole – of Dunedin. For services to Fire and Emergency New Zealand.
- Dean William Rangihuna – of Christchurch. For services to Māori mental health and addiction services.
- Dr Katrina Ivy Roberts – of Matamata. For services to the dairy industry and the community.
- David John Eruera Rogers JP – of Stratford. For services to conservation and Māori.
- Joan Mary Rosier-Jones – of Whanganui. For services to writing and education.
- Deborah Catharine Roxburgh – of Whanganui. For services to Scottish country dancing.
- Dr Udayangani Kumudu Sriya Samarakkody – of Hamilton. For services to paediatric surgery and the Sri Lankan community.
- Professor Marc Timothy Malcolm Shaw – of Hamilton. For services to travel health.
- Alan Frank Simmons – of Tūrangi. For services to outdoor recreation.
- Russell Owen Smith – of Auckland. For services to sexual violence prevention.
- John Trevor Sparling – of Auckland. For services to cricket.
- Trevor Allan Spittle – of Christchurch. For services to athletics.
- Dr Alison Claire Talmage – of Auckland. For services to music therapy and seniors.
- Lorraine Ann Taylor – of Featherston. For services to education.
- Joy Esther Te Wiata – of Opua. For services to sexual violence prevention.
- Jan Althea Tonkin – of Auckland. For services to the business events sector.
- Denise Joanne Torrey – of Christchurch. For services to education.
- Kathleen Tuai-Ta'ufo'ou – of Pōkeno. For services to the Pacific community.
- Captain Alexander van Wijngaarden – of Blenheim. For services to the maritime industry.
- Phillip John Waddington – of Lower Hutt. For services to conservation and art.
- Warwick Kenneth Wilshier – of Whakatāne. For services to the road freight industry.
- Vania Nive Hannah Wolfgramm – of Auckland. For services to rugby.
Peter Adams

Fred Ah Kuoi

Lesley Ansell

Gil Barbezat

Barbara Beable

Michael Beable

Sharon Brownie

Dan Buckingham

Irihapeti Bullmore

Luk Chin

Paul Davidson

Gary Diprose

Richard Douglas

Mervyn English

Mark Fisher

John Flowers

Kendall Flutey

Mark Fraundorfer

Patrick Gale

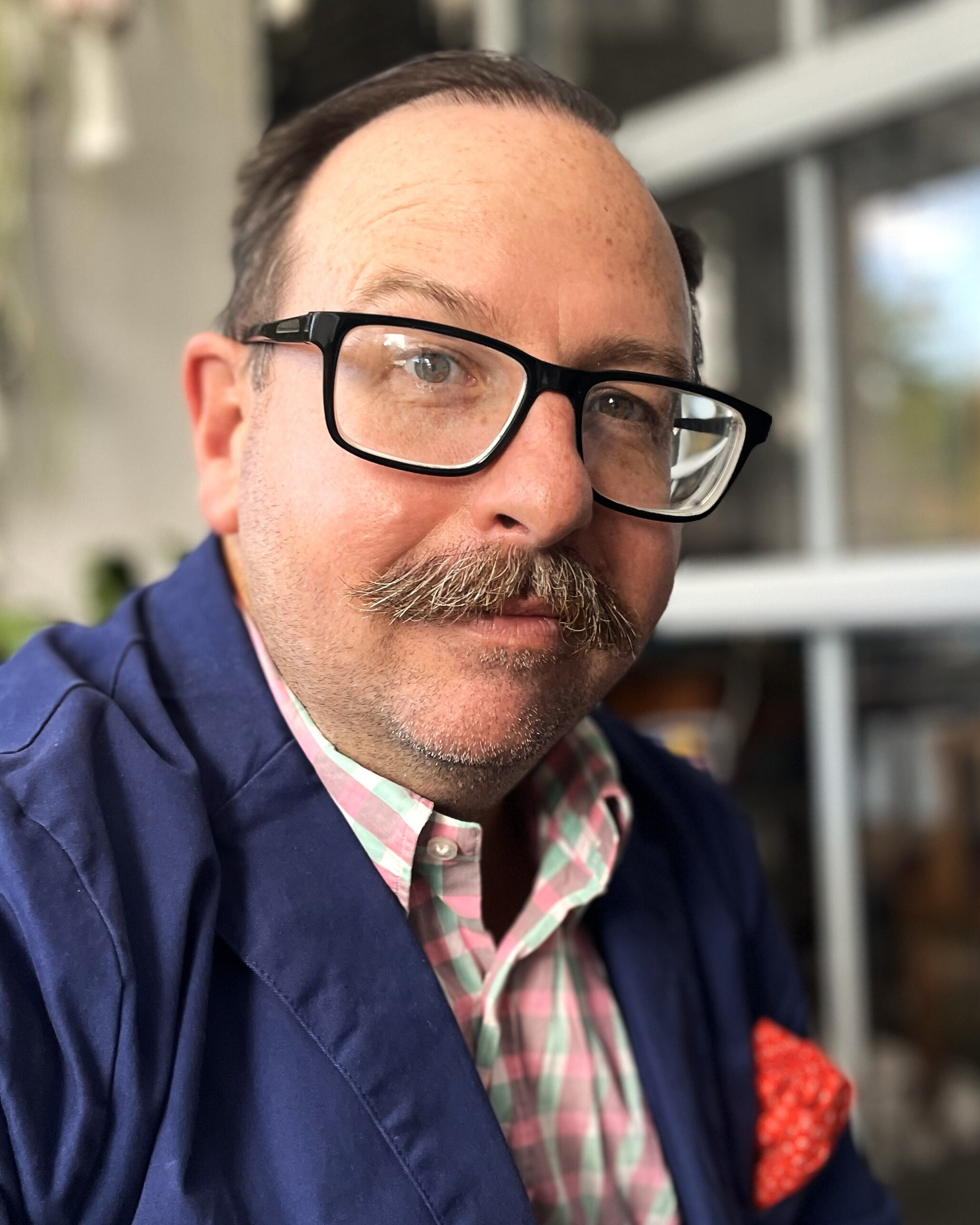
Miles Gregory

Rachael Griffiths‑Hughes

Colin Groves

Joe Hollander

Mike Kawana

Fane Ketu'u

Lisa Kingi-Bon

Shuchi Kothari

Janice Kuka

Vicky Lassen

Anne Lee

Nu Leifi

Greg Lind

Mena Loheni

Mary Low

Shirley Mackay

Liz Maire

Terese Marr

Alison McDonald

Alan McIntyre

Bruce McLachlan

John McWilliam

Terry Nicholas

Bob Norrish

Tina O'Halloran

Esitone Pauga

Morris Pita

Michele Poole

Dean Rangihuna

Katrina Roberts

David Rogers

Joan Rosier-Jones

Debbie Roxburgh

Udaya Samarakkody

Marc Shaw

Alan Simmons

John Sparling

Trevor Spittle

Alison Talmage

Lorraine Taylor

Jan Tonkin

Denise Torrey

Kathleen Tuai‑Ta'ufo'ou

Phil Waddington

Warwick Wilshier

Vania Wolfgramm

== Companion of the King's Service Order (KSO) ==
- The Honourable Paul Joseph Davison KC – of Auckland. For services to public service and the law.
- Robyn Mary Hunt ONZM – of Wellington. For services to people with disabilities and the arts.
- Carolyn Doreen Tremain – of Auckland. For services to the Public Service.
Paul Davison

Robyn Hunt

== King's Service Medal (KSM) ==
- Agnes Abuel-Guda JP – of Rolleston. For services to the Filipino community.
- Amiria (Honey) Belle Amner – of Hastings. For services to sport.
- Rebecca Rae Amundsen – of Invercargill. For services to local government, arts and the community.
- Ravindran (Raveen) Annamalai – of Lower Hutt. For services to ethnic communities.
- Barbara Kay Astill JP – of Auckland. For services to women, the community and governance.
- Neville Thomas Atkinson JP – of Kaiapoi. For services to local government and the community.
- lan John Blunt – of Ōmokoroa. For services to Fire and Emergency New Zealand and the community.
- Keith Duncan Bone – of Hastings. For services to swimming.
- Susan Linda Breen – of Rolleston. For services to gifted children education.
- Amelia Bresanello – of Dunedin. For services to the community.
- Karen Mary Burrows – of Hokitika. For services to sport and the community.
- The Reverend Tapita Taia Ching – of Richmond. For services to the Pacific community and education.
- Rosalind Meronea Corban – of Tokoroa. For services to nursing.
- Grant Neville Craig – of Mosgiel. For services to rail heritage.
- William Alexander Donaldson – of Invercargill. For services to the construction industry and cricket.
- Joy Fletcher – of Picton. For services to the community.
- Edward Keith Ford – of Richmond. For services to Fire and Emergency New Zealand and the dairy industry.
- Mary Catherine Gow – of Paekākāriki. For services to music.
- Rangi (Pania) Kahuna Houkamau-Ngaheu – of Porirua. For services to the community.
- Dianne Kay June – of Hamilton. For services to wildlife conservation.
- Selwyn Robert June – of Hamilton. For services to wildife conservation.
- Graeme Lawrence Kates – of Arthur's Pass National Park. For services to conservation and the community.
- Vaitoelau Kumitau – of Dunedin. For services to the Niuean community.
- Margaret Jane Manson – of Hamilton. For services to the community.
- Brian Lewis Marcroft JP – of Ōhaupō. For services to the community.
- Leigh Martin JP – of Rolleston. For services to brass bands.
- Brent Le Roy Miller – of Auckland. For services to hockey.
- Marlene Morrison – of Christchurch. For services to swimming administration.
- Elizabeth Anne Mortland – of Taihape. For services to the community.
- Johanna (Hanny) Elisabeth Naus – of Wellington. For services to seniors and rainbow communities.
- John Patrick Noble – of Drury. For services to residential care.
- Patricia Mary Noble – of Drury. For services to residential care.
- Ralph Edward Pitcher – of Whangamatā. For services to Fire and Emergency New Zealand and the community.
- Alison Helen Price – of Arrowtown. For services to music education.
- Vijeshni Rattan JP – of Lower Hutt. For services to the community.
- William Wynyard Rayner – of Auckland. For services to seniors and cultural heritage.
- Norma Lynne Roberts – of Lower Hutt. For services to early childhood education.
- Dr Shanthi Selvakumar – of Auckland. For services to migrant and refugee communities.
- Miriam Josephine Spragg – of Christchurch. For services to barbershop singing and music administration.
- Lynette Vera Tankersley – of Masterton. For services to community welfare.
- Frederick Rolland Todd – of Lower Hutt. For services to Parliament.
- Noel Christopher Walker – of Te Anau. For services to Scouts and the community.
- Susan Ellen Walker – of Te Anau. For services to Scouts and the community.
- Jonathan Christopher Walmisley MBE – of Wānaka. For services to the Coastguard and Search and Rescue.
- Kathleen Margaret Webb – of Tauranga. For services to the community.
- Stephen Leonard Westgate JP – of Whangārei. For services to the community.
- Lindsay Gordon Wright – of Gore. For services to rural communities and mental health.
Agnes Abuel-Guda

Honey Amner

Becs Amundsen

Raveen Annamalai

Barbara Astill

Neville Atkinson

Ian Blunt

Keith Bone

Sue Breen

Amelia Bresanello

Karen Burrows

Tapita Ching

Ros Corban

Grant Craig

Joy Fletcher

Ted Ford

Mary Gow

Pania Houkamau‑Ngaheu

Dianne June

Selwyn June

Graeme Kates

Vai Kumitau

Jane Manson

Brian Marcroft

Leigh Martin

Brent Miller

Marlene Morrison

Elizabeth Mortland

Hanny Naus

Ralph Pitcher

Alison Price

Vijeshni Rattan

Bill Rayner

Norma Roberts

Shanthi Selvakumar

Miriam Spragg

Lyn Tankersley

Roland Todd

Noel Walker

Sue Walker

Jonathan Walmisley

Kathy Webb

Steve Westgate

Lindsay Wright

== New Zealand Antarctic Medal (NZAM) ==
- Professor Alan Dudley Hemmings – of Jerrabomberra, Australia. For services to Antarctic law and environmental protection.
Alan Hemmings

== New Zealand Distinguished Service Decoration (DSD) ==
- Warrant Officer Class 2 Robert James Allen – of Palmerston North. For services to the New Zealand Defence Force.
Rob Allen
