= Pare Keiha =

New Zealand academic

Pare Keiha CNZM QSO
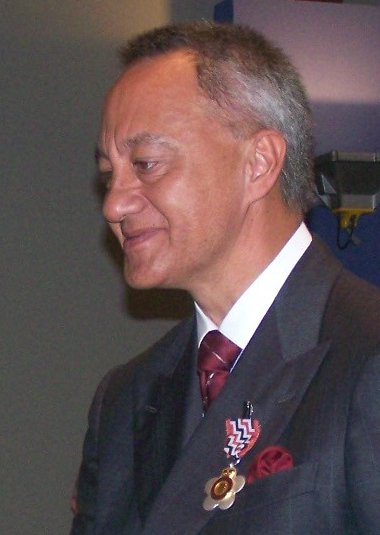
- Keiha in 2008
- Born: Pare Areta Keiha
- Education: University of Auckland
- Scientific career
- Workplaces: University of Auckland; Auckland University of Technology
- Thesis: Bipolar cells for electrowinning lead from molten lead chloride (1988)
- Doctoral students: Ella Henry

Pare Areta Keiha CNZM QSO is a New Zealand academic whose research is in the areas of Māori development, corporate governance, competition law and policy, and intellectual property law. He is Māori, of Whānau-a-Taupara / Te Aitanga-a-Māhaki and Rongowhakaata descent, and as of 2019 is a full professor, pro vice-chancellor and dean at the Auckland University of Technology.

== Academic career ==
After a 1988 PhD titled 'Bipolar cells for electrowinning lead from molten lead chloride' at the University of Auckland, Keiha moved to the Auckland University of Technology, rising to full professor.

Keiha is a member of the Trademarks Māori Advisory Committee and Chair of the Patents Māori Advisory Committee

Keiha is a past-member of the Legal Services Agency Board, and a past trustee of the Te Whanau-A-Taupara Trust. Keiha is on the board of Ngā Pae o te Māramatanga

In the 2008 New Year Honours, Keiha was appointed a Companion of the Queen's Service Order, for services to business, education and Māori. In the 2026 King’s Birthday Honours, he was appointed a Companion of the New Zealand Order of Merit, for services to Maori and education.

== Selected works ==
- Zapalska, Alina M., Dallas Brozik, Helen Dabb, and Pare Keiha. "Teaching Maori students business issues: an experiential approach." Education+ Training 44, no. 3 (2002): 138–143.
- Keiha, P. A., and Paul Moon. "The emergence and evolution of Urban Māori Authorities: A response to Māori urbanisation." (2008).
- Keiha, Pare, and Paul Moon. "New Zealand in the mid-1960s: A Nexus of Culture, Economics, and Ethnicity." Te Kaharoa 9, no. 1 (2016).
