= Chellie Spiller =

New Zealand academic

Chellie Margaret Spiller
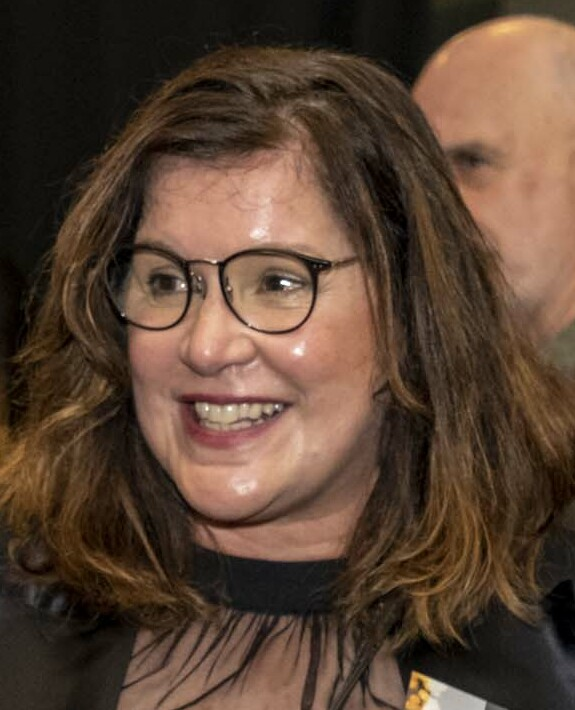
- Spiller in 2023
- Education: University of Auckland
- Scientific career
- Fields: Leadership studies
- Workplaces: University of Waikato
- Thesis: How Māori cultural tourism businesses create authentic and sustainable well-being (2010)
- Website: chelliespiller.com

Chellie Margaret Spiller is a New Zealand academic and is of Māori descent and as of 2019 is a full professor at the University of Waikato.

== Academic career ==
After a 2010 PhD titled 'How Māori cultural tourism businesses create authentic and sustainable well-being' at the University of Auckland, Spiller rose to full professor at the University of Waikato.

In 2011 Spiller was awarded a Fulbright New Zealand Senior Scholar Award to research indigenous business models for creating relational wellbeing in addition to wealth at Harvard University.

In 2015 she co-authored Wayfinding Leadership: Groundbreaking Wisdom for Developing Leaders with Hoturoa Barclay -Kerr and John Panoho.

In 2021 Spiller was among 24 Maori academics featured in the book "Nga Kete Matauranga: Maori Scholars at the Research Interface" by Jacinta Ruru and Waimarie Nikora. The featured academics share their personal journeys, revealing what being Maori has meant for them in their work.

In 2022 Spiller was appointed as a Leader-in-Residence with the Atlantic Institute, University of Oxford to develop a global leadership programme for catalysts of change. Working with a group of Foundational Storytellers she produced a book "The Catalysts Way: A Handbook for people who want to help change the world". She was appointed as a Fellow with the International Leadership Association. In 2022 Spiller was also appointed to the Marsden Council as a member, and convener of the EHB Panel.

== Selected works ==
- Spiller, Chellie, Ljiljana Erakovic, Manuka Henare, and Edwina Pio. "Relational well-being and wealth: Māori businesses and an ethic of care." Journal of Business Ethics 98, no. 1 (2011): 153–169.
- Spiller, Chellie, Edwina Pio, Lijijana Erakovic, and Manuka Henare. "Wise up: Creating organizational wisdom through an ethic of Kaitiakitanga." Journal of Business Ethics 104, no. 2 (2011): 223–235.
- Ladkin, Donna, and Chellie Spiller, eds. Authentic leadership: Clashes, convergences and coalescences. Edward Elgar Publishing, 2013.
- Intezari, Ali, Chellie Spiller, and Shih-ying Yang, eds. Practical wisdom, leadership and culture: Indigenous, Asian and Middle-Eastern perspectives. Routledge, 2020.
- Spiller, Chellie, Hoturoa Barclay-Kerr, and John Panoho. Wayfinding leadership: Ground-breaking wisdom for developing leaders. Huia Publishers, 2015.
- Spiller, C., Maunganui Wolfgramm, R., Henry, E., & Pouwhare, R. Paradigm warriors: Advancing a radical ecosystems view of collective leadership from an Indigenous Māori perspective. Human Relations, 73(4), (2020) 516–543.
- Spiller, Chellie. "‘I AM’: Indigenous consciousness for authenticity and leadership." Leadership 17.4 (2021): 491–496.
