= List of engineering societies =

An engineering society is a professional organization for engineers of various disciplines. Some are umbrella type organizations which accept many different disciplines, while others are discipline-specific. Many award professional designations, such as European Engineer, professional engineer, chartered engineer, incorporated engineer or similar. There are also many student-run engineering societies, commonly at universities or technical colleges.

== Africa ==
=== Ghana ===
- Ghana Institution of Engineers

=== Nigeria ===
- Nigerian Society of Engineers
- Council for the Regulation of Engineering in Nigeria

=== South Africa ===
- South African Institute of Electrical Engineers
- Engineering Council of South Africa

=== Zimbabwe ===
- Zimbabwe Institution of Engineers

== Americas ==
=== Canada ===
In Canada, the term "engineering society" sometimes refers to organizations of engineering students as opposed to professional societies of engineers. The Canadian Federation of Engineering Students, whose membership consists of most of the engineering student societies from across Canada (see below), is the national association of undergraduate engineering student societies in Canada.

Canada also has many traditions related to the calling of an engineer.

The Engineering Institute of Canada (French: l'Institut Canadien des ingénieurs) has the following member societies:

- Institution of Mechanical Engineers (Canadian Branch of the IMechE)
- Canadian Maritime Section of the Marine Technology Society
- Canadian Nuclear Society
- Canadian Society for Chemical Engineering
- Canadian Society for Civil Engineering

==== Ontario ====
- Professional Engineers Ontario
- Engineering Society of Queen's University
- Lassonde Engineering Society

=== United States ===
- Alpha Omega Epsilon
- Alpha Pi Mu
- American Academy of Environmental Engineers and Scientists
- American Association of Engineering Societies
- American Indian Council of Architects and Engineers
- American Indian Science and Engineering Society
- American Institute of Aeronautics and Astronautics
- American Institute of Chemical Engineers
- American Nuclear Society
- American Railway Engineering Association
- American Society for Engineering Education
- American Society for Engineering Management
- American Society for Nondestructive Testing
- American Society of Agricultural and Biological Engineers
- American Society of Civil Engineers
- American Society of Heating, Refrigerating and Air-Conditioning Engineers
- American Society of Mechanical Engineers
- American Society of Naval Engineers
- American Society of Plumbing Engineers
- American Society of Safety Engineers
- American Welding Society
- Architectural Engineering Institute
- ASM International
- Association for the Advancement of Cost Engineering
- Association for Computing Machinery
- Audio Engineering Society
- Biomedical Engineering Society
- Chi Epsilon
- Eta Kappa Nu
- Institute of Biological Engineering
- Institute of Electrical and Electronics Engineers
- Institute of Industrial and Systems Engineers
- Institute of Transportation Engineers
- National Academy of Engineering
- National Society of Black Engineers
- National Society of Professional Engineers
- Order of the Engineer
- Phi Sigma Rho
- Pi Tau Sigma
- Society for the Advancement of Material and Process Engineering
- Society of American Military Engineers
- Society of Automotive Engineers
- Society of Broadcast Engineers
- Society of Fire Protection Engineers
- Society of Hispanic Professional Engineers
- Society of Manufacturing Engineers
- Society of Naval Architects and Marine Engineers
- Society of Petroleum Engineers
- Society of Plastics Engineers
- Society of Women Engineers
- Tau Beta Pi
- Theta Tau
- Tire Society
- Vertical Flight Society

== Asia ==
=== Association of Southeast Asian Nations ===
- ASEAN Academy of Engineering and Technology

=== Azerbaijan ===
- Caspian Engineers Society

=== Bangladesh ===
- Bangladesh Computer Society
- Institution of Engineers, Bangladesh
- Professional Engineers of Bangladesh

=== China ===
- Chinese Academy of Engineering
- Chinese Academy of Sciences
- China Association for Science and Technology
- Chinese Society for Electrical Engineering

=== Hong Kong ===
- Hong Kong Institution of Engineers
- International Association of Engineers

=== India ===
- Aeronautical Society of India
- Computer Society of India
- Engineering Council of India
- Indian Institute of Chemical Engineers
- Indian Institution of Industrial Engineering
- Indian Society for Technical Education
- Indian Science Congress Association
- Institution of Electronics and Telecommunication Engineers
- Institution of Engineers (India)
- Institution of Mechanical Engineers (India)
- Society of EMC Engineers (India)

=== Japan ===
- Japan Society of Civil Engineers
- Union of Japanese Scientists and Engineers

=== Jordan ===
- Jordanian Engineers Association

=== Malaysia ===
- Board of Engineers Malaysia

=== Pakistan ===
- National Technology Council (Pakistan)
- Pakistan Engineering Council

=== Philippines ===
- Institute of Electronics Engineers of the Philippines
- Philippine Institute of Civil Engineers
- Society of Naval Architects and Marine Engineers

=== Saudi Arabia ===
- Saudi Council of Engineers

=== Sri Lanka ===
- Institution of Engineers, Sri Lanka
- Institution of Incorporated Engineers, Sri Lanka

== Europe ==
- European Association for Structural Dynamics
- European Federation of National Engineering Associations
- European Society for Engineering Education

=== Azerbaijan ===
- Caspian Engineers Society

=== France ===
- Association Française de Mécanique

=== Germany ===
- Verein Deutscher Ingenieure

=== Greece ===
- Technical Chamber of Greece (Τεχνικό Επιμελητήριο Ελλάδας - ΤΕΕ)
- Professional-Scientific Society of Engineers of Technological Education; also known as Professional & Scientific Association of Technological Education Engineers (Επαγγελματική-Επιστημονική Ένωση Τεχνολογικής Εκπαίδευσης Μηχανικών - ΕΕΤΕΜ)

=== Ireland ===
- Institution of Engineers of Ireland
- Institute of Physics and Engineering in Medicine

=== Lithuania ===
- Linpra

=== Portugal ===
- Ordem dos Engenheiros

=== Romania ===
- General Association of Engineers of Romania

=== Russia ===
- Russian Union of Engineers

=== Turkey ===
- Chamber of Computer Engineers of Turkey
- Chamber of Electrical Engineers of Turkey
- Union of chambers of Turkish engineers and architects

=== United Kingdom ===
In the United Kingdom, the Engineering Council is the regulatory body for the engineering profession. The Engineering Council was incorporated by Royal charter in 1981 and controls the award of chartered engineer, incorporated engineer, engineering technician, and information and communications technology technician titles, through licences issued to thirty six recognised Institutions. There are also 19 professional affiliate institutions, not licensed, but with close associations to the Engineering Council.

The Royal Academy of Engineering is the national academy for engineering.

==== Professional institutions licensed by the Engineering Council ====
- British Computer Society
- British Institute of Non-Destructive Testing
- Chartered Association of Building Engineers
- Chartered Institution of Civil Engineering Surveyors
- Chartered Institute of Plumbing and Heating Engineering
- Chartered Institution of Building Services Engineers
- Chartered Institution of Highways and Transportation
- Chartered Institution of Water and Environmental Management
- Energy Institute
- Institute for Systems Engineering
- Institute of Acoustics
- Institute of Cast Metals Engineers
- Institute of Healthcare Engineering and Estate Management
- Institute of Highway Engineers
- Institute of Marine Engineering, Science and Technology
- Institute of Materials, Minerals and Mining
- Institute of Measurement and Control
- Institute of Physics
- Institute of Physics and Engineering in Medicine
- Institute of Water
- Institution of Agricultural Engineers
- Institution of Chemical Engineers
- Institution of Civil Engineers
- Institution of Diesel and Gas Turbine Engineers
- Institution of Engineering Designers
- Institution of Engineering and Technology
- Institution of Fire Engineers
- Institution of Lighting Professionals
- Institution of Mechanical Engineers
- Institution of Railway Signal Engineers
- Institution of Structural Engineers
- Nuclear Institute
- Permanent Way Institution
- Royal Aeronautical Society
- Royal Engineers
- Royal Institution of Naval Architects
- Society of Environmental Engineers
- Society of Operations Engineers
- The Welding Institute

==== Professional affiliate bodies of the Engineering Council ====
- Chartered Quality Institute
- Institute of Cast Metals Engineers
- Institute of Quarrying
- Institute of Refrigeration
- Institute of Telecommunications Professionals
- Royal Institution of Chartered Surveyors
- Royal Institute of Navigation

==== Professional engineering bodies not affiliated to the Engineering Council ====
- Cleveland Institution of Engineers
- Institution of Engineers and Shipbuilders in Scotland
- Institute of the Motor Industry
- Society of Professional Engineers UK
- Women's Engineering Society

==== Former bodies merged or defunct ====
- Institution of Electrical Engineers
- Institution of Incorporated Engineers
- Institution of Nuclear Engineers
- Society of Engineers UK

== Oceania ==
=== Australia ===
- Association of Professional Engineers, Scientists and Managers, Australia
- Engineers Australia

=== New Zealand ===
- Engineering New Zealand
- University of Canterbury Engineering Society

== International ==
- Audio Engineering Society
- International Association of Engineers
- International Council of Academies of Engineering and Technological Sciences
- International Council on Systems Engineering
- International Federation of Engineering Education Societies
- International Geodetic Student Organisation
- International Society of Automation
- International Society for Optical Engineering
- Institute of Electrical and Electronics Engineers
- National Society of Black Engineers
- Society of Automotive Engineers
- Society of Petroleum Engineers
- Society of Professional Engineers UK
- Society of Women Engineers
- World Federation of Engineering Organizations

== See also ==
- Engineering
- Fields of engineering
- Learned society
- Standards organization
- The Ritual of the Calling of an Engineer
