= Architectural engineer (PE) =

Engineer specializing in the design and operation of buildings

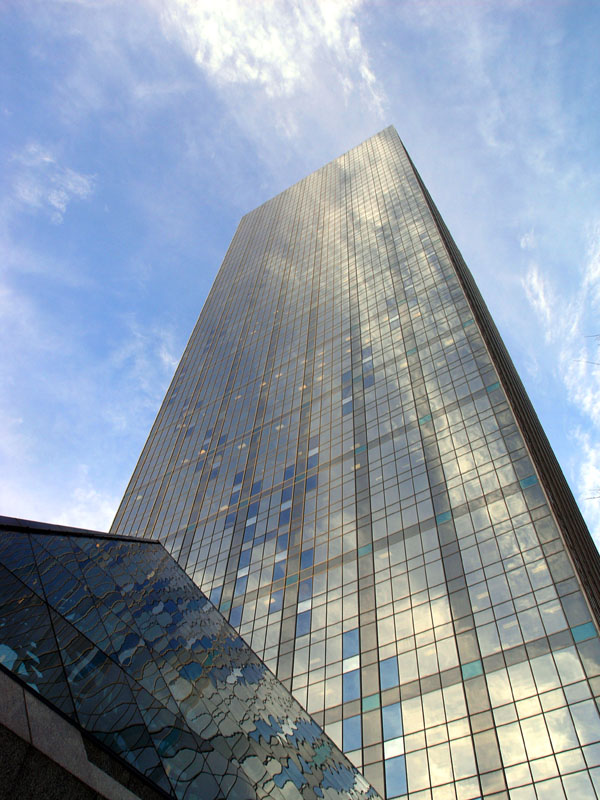

Architectural Engineer (PE) is a professional engineering designation in the United States. The architectural engineer applies the knowledge and skills of broader engineering disciplines to the design, construction, operation, maintenance, and renovation of buildings and their component systems while paying careful attention to their effects on the surrounding environment.

With the establishment of a specific "Architectural Engineering" NCEES professional engineering registration examination in the 1990s and first offering in April 2003, architectural engineering is now recognized as a distinct engineering discipline in the United States.

Note that in the United States Architects are not to be confused with "architectural engineering technology" which is different from architectural engineering; in the United States architectural engineering technologists tend to be "Engineering Technicians" that utilize CAD technology as drafters or technical assistants who do not have a license to practice either Architecture or Engineering, usually hired by larger construction firms or developers who prefer to cut out architectural design and maintain high costs of construction for standard processes and common building materials, while in Europe, Canada, South Africa and other countries Architectural technologists have a role similar to Architects and Architectural Engineers.

== Areas of focus ==
- Architecture (if licensed as an Architect)
- Structural engineering
- Construction engineering
- Construction management
- Project management
- Green building
- Heating, ventilation and air conditioning (HVAC)
- Plumbing and piping (hydronics)
- Energy management
- Fire protection engineering
- Building power systems
- Lighting
- Building transportation systems
- Acoustics, noise & vibration control

A common combined specialization is Mechanical, Electrical and Plumbing, better known by its abbreviation MEP. An MEP design engineer has experience in HVAC, lighting/electrical, and plumbing systems' analysis and design.

== Some topics of special interest ==
- Building construction
- Building Information Modeling (BIM)
- Efficient energy use, Energy conservation or Energy demand management
- Renewable energy
- Solar energy
- Green buildings
- Intelligent buildings
- Autonomous buildings
- Indoor air quality
- Thermal comfort

== Educational institutions offering bachelor's degrees in architectural engineering ==
Programs accredited by the Engineering Accreditation Commission (EAC) of ABET and that are members of Architectural Engineering Institute (AEI) are denoted below.

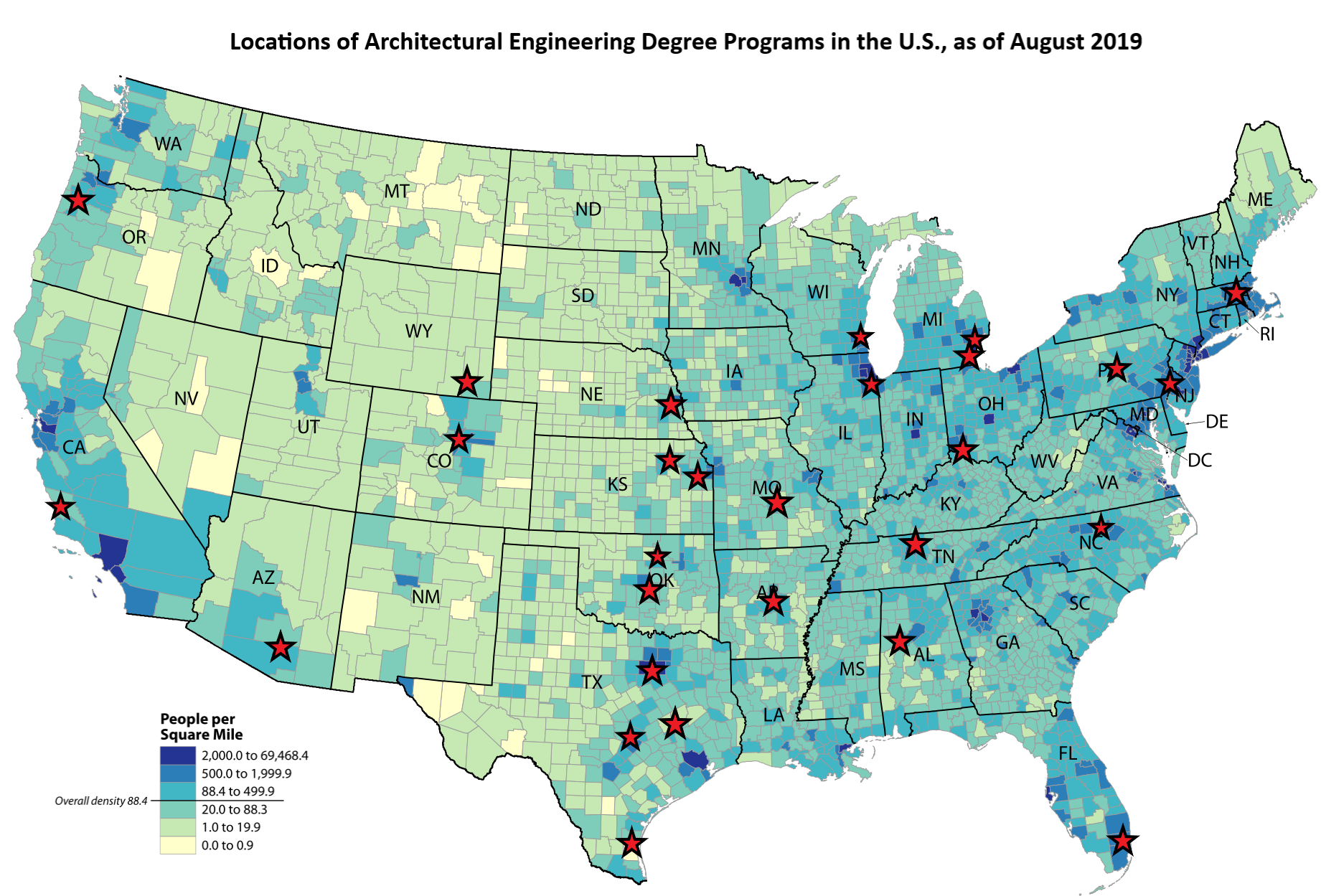
Architectural engineering degree programs' locations in the United States, including the four started recently (August 2019)

- California Polytechnic State University, San Luis Obispo, California (ABET, AEI)
- Drexel University, Philadelphia, Pennsylvania (ABET, AEI)
- Illinois Institute of Technology, Chicago, Illinois (ABET, AEI)
- Kansas State University, Manhattan, Kansas (ABET, AEI)
- Lawrence Technological University, Southfield, Michigan (ABET)
- Milwaukee School of Engineering, Milwaukee, Wisconsin (ABET, AEI)
- North Carolina A&T State University, Greensboro, North Carolina (ABET, AEI)
- Oklahoma State University, Stillwater, Oklahoma (ABET, AEI)
- Oregon State University, Corvallis, Oregon
- Penn State University, State College, Pennsylvania (ABET, AEI)
- Tennessee State University, Nashville, Tennessee (ABET, AEI)
- Texas A&M University, College Station, Texas
- Texas A&M University, Kingsville, Kingsville, Texas (ABET, AEI)
- University of Alabama, Tuscaloosa, Alabama (ABET)
- University of Arizona, Tucson, Arizona
- University of Arkansas at Little Rock, Little Rock, Arkansas (ABET)
- University of Cincinnati, Cincinnati, Ohio (ABET)
- University of Colorado at Boulder, Boulder, Colorado (ABET, AEI)
- University of Detroit Mercy, Detroit, Michigan (ABET)
- University of Kansas, Lawrence, Kansas (ABET, AEI)
- University of Miami, Miami, Florida (ABET, AEI)
- Missouri University of Science and Technology, Rolla, Missouri (ABET, AEI)
- University of Nebraska at Omaha, Omaha, Nebraska (ABET, AEI)
- University of Oklahoma, Norman, Oklahoma (ABET)
- University of Texas at Arlington, Arlington, Texas
- University of Texas at Austin, Austin, Texas (ABET, AEI)
- University of Wyoming, Laramie, Wyoming (ABET, AEI)
- Worcester Polytechnic Institute, Worcester, Massachusetts (ABET)

== See also ==
- Accreditation Board for Engineering and Technology
- American Society of Heating, Refrigerating and Air-Conditioning Engineers
- American Society of Plumbing Engineers
- Architectural Engineering Institute
- Architectural technologist
- Associated General Contractors of America
- Illuminating Engineering Society of North America
- List of construction occupations
- National Society of Professional Engineers
- Society of Fire Protection Engineers
- Structural engineering
- U.S. Green Building Council
