= Engineering Undergraduate Society of the University of British Columbia =

Engineering Undergraduate Society (EUS), is the engineering society at the University of British Columbia. It organizes Engineering department events but is perhaps best known for practical jokes (STUdeNT projectS) it has played in the past, including hanging the frame of a Volkswagen Beetle off bridges. The members of the EUS are known for their pride of being engineering students and conspicuous displays thereof. EUS members often incorrectly refer to themselves as Engineers even though they are Engineering Students (cf. Engineer-in-Training and Professional Engineer).

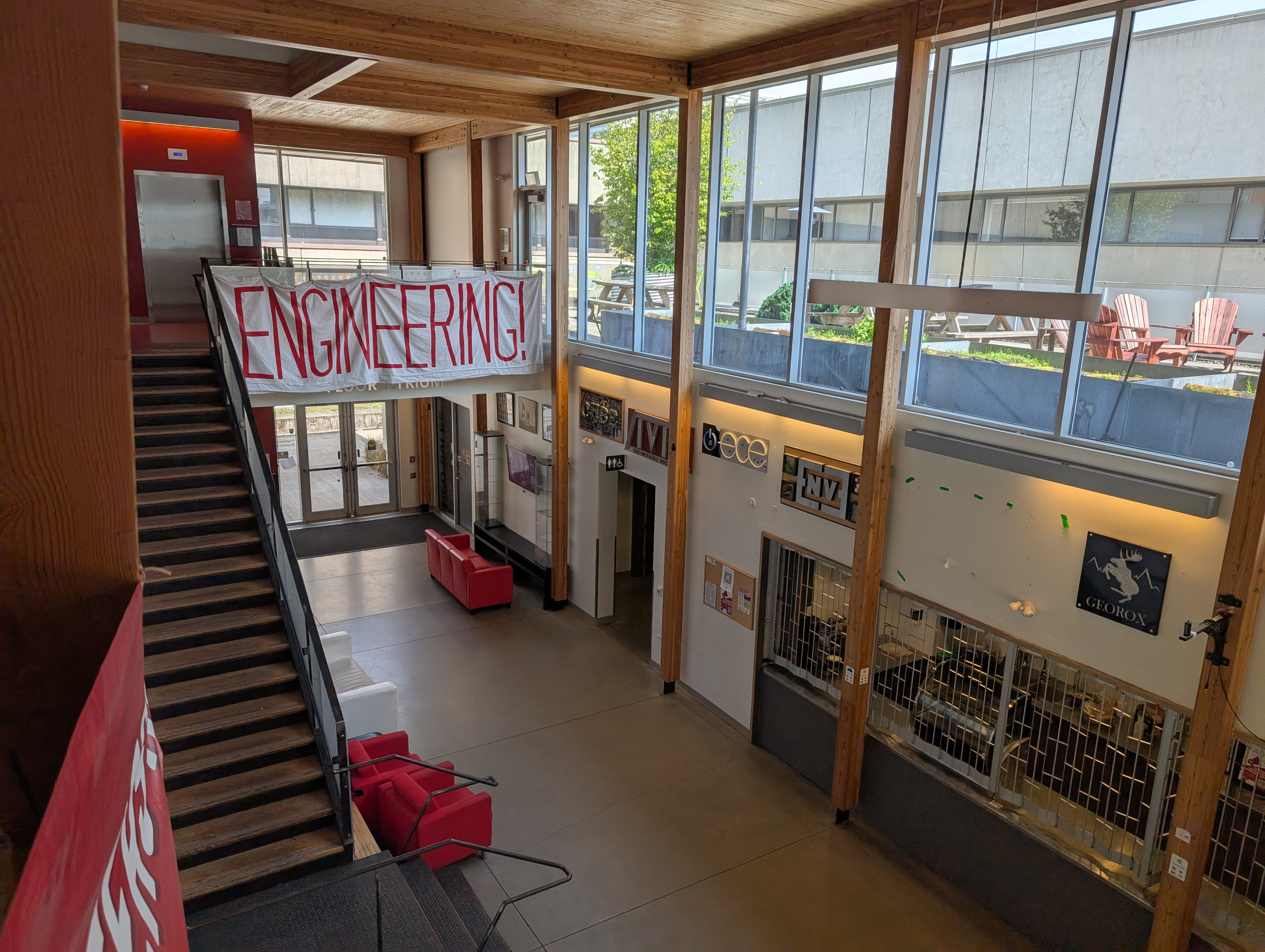
The Engineering Student Centre (ESC), home of the Engineering Undergraduate Society.

The EUS is a constituency of the Alma Mater Society of the University of British Columbia Vancouver known to students as the AMS. The EUS was previously a member of the Canadian Federation of Engineering Students.

== Mission ==
The mission statement of the organization is "support the academic, professional, and social needs of engineering students, encourage excellence in all aspects of student life, and celebrate the accomplishments of its members."

== Government ==
The EUS Board of Directors is the decision-making body for the engineers within the Faculty of Applied Science at UBC. The EUS Board consists of the EUS Executive (President, Vice-President Spirit, Vice-President Finance, Vice-President Communications, Vice-President External, Vice-President Administration, Vice-President Student Life, Vice-President Academic), a representative from each of the 12 departments and a representative from the first year engineering students. The Board directs the Executive on how to operate throughout the year, while the Executive carries out these tasks. Non-voting members of council include the Faculty of Applied Science Student Senator, the AMS rep and a member from each of the Ex Officio Clubs.

The president of the EUS, along with one other elected representatives, sit on the Alma Mater Society of UBC Student Council, representing engineering to the other undergraduate student societies at UBC.

=== Departments within Engineering at UBC ===
- Biomedical Engineering
- Chemical and Biological Engineering
- Civil Engineering
- Electrical and Computer Engineering
- Engineering Physics
- Environmental Engineering
- Geological Engineering
- Integrated Engineering
- Manufacturing Engineering
- Mechanical Engineering
- Materials Engineering
- Mining Engineering
- First Years (PPs)
- Ex Officio Clubs. (Sigma Phi Delta Engineering Fraternity; Pi Nu Kappa Engineering Sorority; Engineers Without Borders; IEEE UBC Chapter; UBC Women in Engineering; UBC Queers and Gears)

== Institutional Reform ==
Established in 1918, the EUS has always placed a large emphasis on furthering traditions much like a fraternity. Unlike a fraternity the EUS membership was never gender specific. These traditions primarily involve socializing, drinking and ritual. It had been a long-held view that these behaviours were tolerated and encouraged by the Engineering Faculty and engineering profession as they imbue engineering students with a sense of identity as engineers and that this identity leads to a more cohesive professional body. Many of these traditions were identified as being sexist by those outside the Engineering Department, and in the last two decades have gradually been eliminated.

In the most recent decade, however, criticisms of the organization's legitimacy and function arose from within its own members. The organization was seen as archaic and antiquated due to changing student demographics and greater emphasis on equity and diversity throughout the university. In 2008 a Constitutional Referendum led by then President Bowinn Ma to establish significant institutional reform was held. The referendum achieved resounding success turned the organization around. While tradition remains prevalent within the organization, more resources are now focused towards academic and professional services such as scholarships, tutoring, and development.

== Traditions ==
=== Engineering Week ===
As the official Decree states "Hereafter, let it be known that the third week of the first month of all years of our Lord shall be deemed the Week of Engineering." Engineering week at UBC is organized by the VP Student Life and their E-Week Directors. During this week the EUS holds many events at which the Departments compete against each other for points. Opening Ceremonies, traditionally, is the first event and the Engineer's Ball is the final event. The winner of E-Week is awarded the E-Week trophy, which varies year to year. In the past, this has included a wooden cairn with a golden E, a brick, and an actual trophy. The current trophy is nicknamed the "StanlE-Week Cup" it is a replica Stanley Cup with "E-WEEK CHAMPIONS" engraved on it.

=== Stunts ===
Collecting details of past stunts is difficult because they are carried out by anonymous teams of students. The general knowledge of stunts includes hanging the frame of a Volkswagen Beetle off bridges including the Golden Gate (2001) and the Lions Gate Bridge (several times). Engineering students led by Johan Thornton also modified the lights on the Lions Gate Bridge to blink out in morse code "UBC Engineers Do it Again" and in 1992 they stole and later returned the Rose Bowl trophy from a trophy case at the University of Washington. Other stunts involve well known objects from around British Columbia. These include the borrowing of the speaker's chair from the BC Legislature and the Mile-Zero sign from the Alaska Highway.

In 2008 the UBC Engineers were accused of hanging another VW Beetle shell off the Lions Gate Bridge as well as of painting and disabling the Nine O'clock gun in Stanley Park. Although they have not denied the VW shell hanging, their official statement on the topic insists that the Society was not involved in the vandalism of the gun.

In February 2009 five UBC Engineering students were arrested while trying to hang a VW Beetle shell off of the Ironworkers Memorial Bridge. The shell fell into the Burrard Inlet during the prank. Prosecutors considered charging the students but ultimately decided not to.

In April 2012 it was reported that UBC engineering students were thought to be responsible for the placement of a red VW beetle on the pier of the Golden Ears Bridge.

In February 2014 UBC engineering students repeated a past prank by placing a red VW Beetle on top of the Ladner Clock Tower on the UBC campus, which is 121 feet tall. They also renovated the office of the dean of engineering into a janitor's closet.

Other pranks in the past have involved the Massey Tunnel and the wooden rollercoaster at the PNE.

=== The Cairn ===
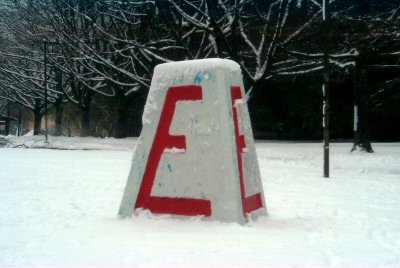
The Cairn painted with a large red 'E' for engineering

The Cairn is a large concrete object that symbolizes the Engineering Undergraduate Society's contribution to student life on campus. It was originally constructed on January 26, 1966 out of rocks and concrete, with a plaque inscribed with “in humble appreciation of the diversified and continuing contributions to campus life by the Engineers". Normally, the cairn is painted white with a red 'E' for engineering, however it is frequently repainted and defaced by other faculties. Due to frequently attempts by students of other faculties to destroy the cairn, or removals by UBC staff and facilities, the cairn did not settle in its current location until February 11, 1989. The current cairn as well as all predecessors exists not because it was installed in accordance with UBC's planning and building process, but because the engineering students simply installed it there. As the cairn is rebuilt each time, engineering students attempt to further reinforce its permanence by adding stronger foundations and rebar.

Myths surrounding the cairn include the cairn containing full propane tanks to discourage attacks by pneumatic drill, as well as a Faculty of Forestry "Omar", a pickup truck bought by the Faculty of Forestry for Forestry week, in the bottom of the concrete base.

The Cairn is currently 8 feet tall.

=== Cheeze ===
The EUS is housed in a building known as The Cheeze. The Cheeze or Cheese Factory is a former cheese factory located at 2335 Engineering Road, UBC—east of the Cairn. The building, built in 1919, was the oldest wood-frame building on campus and had been modified for use by the EUS.

The Cheeze has been replaced by a new and larger student building designed to better accommodate the needs of the engineering students, whose numbers cannot be supported by the small size of the Cheeze. The Engineering Student Centre Project was led by former Vice-president Communications & Administration, Andrew Carne. Demolition of the Cheeze took place on April 24, 2014, in one day. The construction process of the new Engineering Student Centre was completed in the summer of 2015.

=== Lady Godiva Ride ===
Consistent with traditions at other Canadian universities the EUS historically paid a woman (often a professional stripper) to ride naked on an animal or a chariot through campus. The practice was called the Lady Godiva Ride in reference to Lady Godiva, the 'patron saint of Engineers'. The ride drew vocal and diverse protests in the UBC Senate, in the BC Legislature, from the AMS, students and student groups. A central issue of the protests was gender, and to counter that argument the engineers also paraded a naked man in 1982. In 1986 the EUS bowed to protests and replaced the annual March ride with a mock funeral procession, only to stage a strip show in the Hebb Theatre. An aspect of the tradition was the publication of photographs of the 'Godiva' in the newspaper of the EUS aka 'Red Rag' -- not to be confused with the current nEUSpaper. Much debate focused on censorship and the scope of a university's duties to be inclusive. This practice continued throughout the 1980s in spite of the rise of modern feminism and ended on all Canadian campuses after the École Polytechnique massacre.

=== Red jackets ===
A UBC Engineering jacket is often termed a 'Red' or a 'Red Jacket'. It is a red wool jacket with white details, with the text: "UBC ENGINEERS" on the back. The Red Jacket is used to show pride in the faculty and usually has many patches sewn on, many of which have to be earned by the wearer of the jacket, although some may be purchased. The tradition of wearing Engineering Red goes back many years to when all the faculties on campus wore their colours. Now the EUS and SUS (the Science Undergraduate Society) are the only faculties who sell jackets, with the EUS jacket being far more popular.

=== Engineer's Hymn ===
The hymn is generally sung by the UBC engineers in various events, although it is an international engineering song. The hymn itself is about 64 lines in total. Various versions of the hymn exist although they all share the same chorus. The following is the chorus of the hymn:

"We are, we are, we are, we are, we are the Engineers!

We can, we can, we can, we can, demolish forty beers.

Drink rum, drink rum, drink rum, drink rum, drink rum, and follow us,

For we don't give a damn for any old man who don't give a damn for us!"

== See also ==
- Engineering traditions in Canada
- University of British Columbia Alma Mater Society
- Canadian Federation of Engineering Students
