= CES =

CES, ces, Ces, or CEs may refer to:

== Technology ==
- Circuit Emulation Service, a telecommunication technology
- Cryogenic energy storage
- Character encoding scheme, a reversible transformation of sequences of code units to sequences of bytes
- Charge-exchange spectroscopy, a diagnostic used in plasma physics

== Companies ==
- ICAO Code designator for China Eastern Airlines

== Medicine ==
- Cauda equina syndrome, a serious neurological condition
- Cranial electrotherapy stimulation, therapeutic brain stimulation
- Camurati-Engelmann disease, also called "Camurati Engelmann syndrome" (CES)
- Carboxylesterase, an enzyme that catalyzes the reaction between a carboxylic ester and water

== Organizations ==
- Caspian Engineers Society
- Center for Economic Studies, LMU Munich
- Center for Ethical Solutions, bioethics think tank in the United States
- Centre for Environmental Studies, former UK research organization
- Church Educational System, of The Church of Jesus Christ of Latter-day Saints
- Coalition for Economic Survival, a Los Angeles–based community organization
- Coalition of Essential Schools, US educational reform
- Community Exchange System, international Internet trading network
- Commonwealth Employment Service, former Australian Government employment agency
- Confédération Européenne de Scoutisme or Confederation of European Scouts
- Consumer Electronics Show, an annual technology trade show in Las Vegas, Nevada, United States
- Centre for European Studies (disambiguation), the name of several educational institutions
- Center for Election Science, a US-based approval voting advocacy organization

== People ==
- Jean Ces, French boxer of the 1920s

== Transportation ==
- Central South station, a proposed MTR station in Hong Kong
- Cessnock Airport, IATA airport code "CES"
- Cressing railway station, British railway station with station code CES

== Other uses ==
- Closed ecological system, isolated from the outside
- Clean Energy Standards, part of the climate change policy of the United States
- Constant elasticity of substitution, in economics, a feature of a particular class of production function
- The ISO 639 code for the Czech language
