= ENSOC =

Engineering Society at the University of Canterbury

University of Canterbury Engineering Society Inc. (ENSOC)
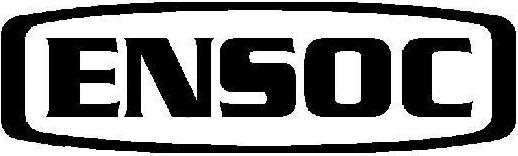
- Company type: Incorporated Society
- Industry: Engineering Society
- Founded: 19 May 1897
- Headquarters: Christchurch, New Zealand
- Members: 2,500+
- Website: ensoc.com

ENSOC, short for Engineering Society and formally the University of Canterbury Engineering Society Inc., is a faculty-based student society at the University of Canterbury in Christchurch, New Zealand founded in 1897. The Society was established as a medium for scholars to discuss relevant engineering issues and to fraternise.

Nowadays, ENSOC is the largest faculty club at the University and welcomes members from all faculties. ENSOC is run by a student committee elected annually by the university's engineering students.

== Objectives ==
ENSOC is an incorporated society whose constitutional objectives include:

- To hold meetings at which papers may be presented, or addresses given, on engineering or allied subjects.
- To assist members to understand the conduct of meetings, presenting papers, and promote knowledge desirable to practice as a professional engineer.
- To further the cultural, educational, engineering and allied interests of members of the Society in particular and the School of Engineering in general.

== History ==
The Canterbury College Engineering Society was founded by the Engineering School Dean, Professor-in-charge Robert Scott on 19 May 1897 when the School of Engineering was merely 10 years old. As such, it is one of the oldest surviving student clubs at the University of Canterbury; only being younger than the Christian Union by a couple of months. In the early decades of the 20th century, the Engineering Society was regarded as one of the most important student organisation of what was then Canterbury College, alongside the Christian Union and the Dialectic Society.

== Academic activities ==
- Intermediate Mentoring – ENSOC organise an end of semester coaching series for struggling intermediates. The coaching is typically undertaken by members of the ENSOC Committee and other final year engineering students and capitalises on the positive role model status of its coaches. The activities include assistance with homework, individual "pep-talks", miniature construction activities.
- Student Representation – The ENSOC Chairman along with five other members selected by the ENSOC Committee represent student interests at the monthly College of Engineering Faculty meetings. The chairman is consulted by senior members of the college and Faculty on matters of interest to students and may attend Head of Department meetings on a casual basis.
- The Templin Scroll – a competition instituted by Honorary Life Member J. R. Templin in 1941 to reward the best technical paper presented before the Society.

== Industry-related activities ==
- E3 – ENSOC Engineering Expo – ENSOC in association with the College of Engineering operate a one-day event showcasing local, national and international engineering firms keen to recruit new graduates as well as summer interns. The day is beneficial for intermediate students unsure of which stream to select. Firms typically set up a stand in the School of Engineering concourse and can also provide a 20-minute presentation in adjoining lecture rooms with question and answer sessions to finish.
- IPENZ Canterbury Branch – ENSOC members are invited to attend the activities of the local IPENZ branch. These usually consist of presentation followed by a social hour and site visits to matters of local engineering interest. The ENSOC Chairman is ex-officio a member of IPENZ Canterbury Branch Committee.
- Student Engineers of NZ – (SENZ) – ENSOC is a foundation member of this national engineering student body. Since its inception in 2004 ENSOC has provided the majority of attendees and won all its competitions.

== Sporting activities ==
The Marlowe Cup is the societies most famous exchange with the University of Otago. It occurs annually between the Otago University School of Mines (Surveying School) and the Canterbury University Engineering College.

ENSOC also puts on social competitions for touch rugby, rugby, soccer, netball and squash.

== ENSOC Shop ==
ENSOC operate a stationery shop at arm's length from the main organisation. The shop also operates as an information desk for the Society and the School. The ENSOC Shop has been in operation from before 1960 and is run by a shopkeeper interviewed and selected by the outgoing committee at the end of each year and assistants hand picked by the Shopkeeper. As shop staff are volunteers prices are close to cost price.

== Famous office bearers ==
- T R Burt – Secretary 1897 – Founder of the modern Master Trade and PDL Brand
- Robert Scott (1861–1930), founder of the School of Engineering and President/Patron of the Engineering Society (1897–1922)

== See also ==
- Engineering Society
- Undie 500
