= Federation of Students =

Federation of Students can be for:

- Australian Liberal Students Federation
- Black African Students Federation in France
- Canadian Federation of Students
- Canadian Federation of Engineering Students
- Federation of Conservative Students
- Federation of Student Islamic Societies
- Hong Kong Federation of Students
- Student Federation of the University of Ottawa
- Students' Federation of India
- University of Waterloo Federation of Students
- York Federation of Students
