= Undie 500 =

Student-run car rally

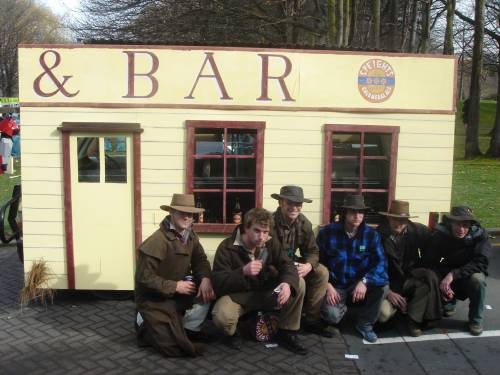
Decorated Undie 500 vehicle (there is a van behind the facade).

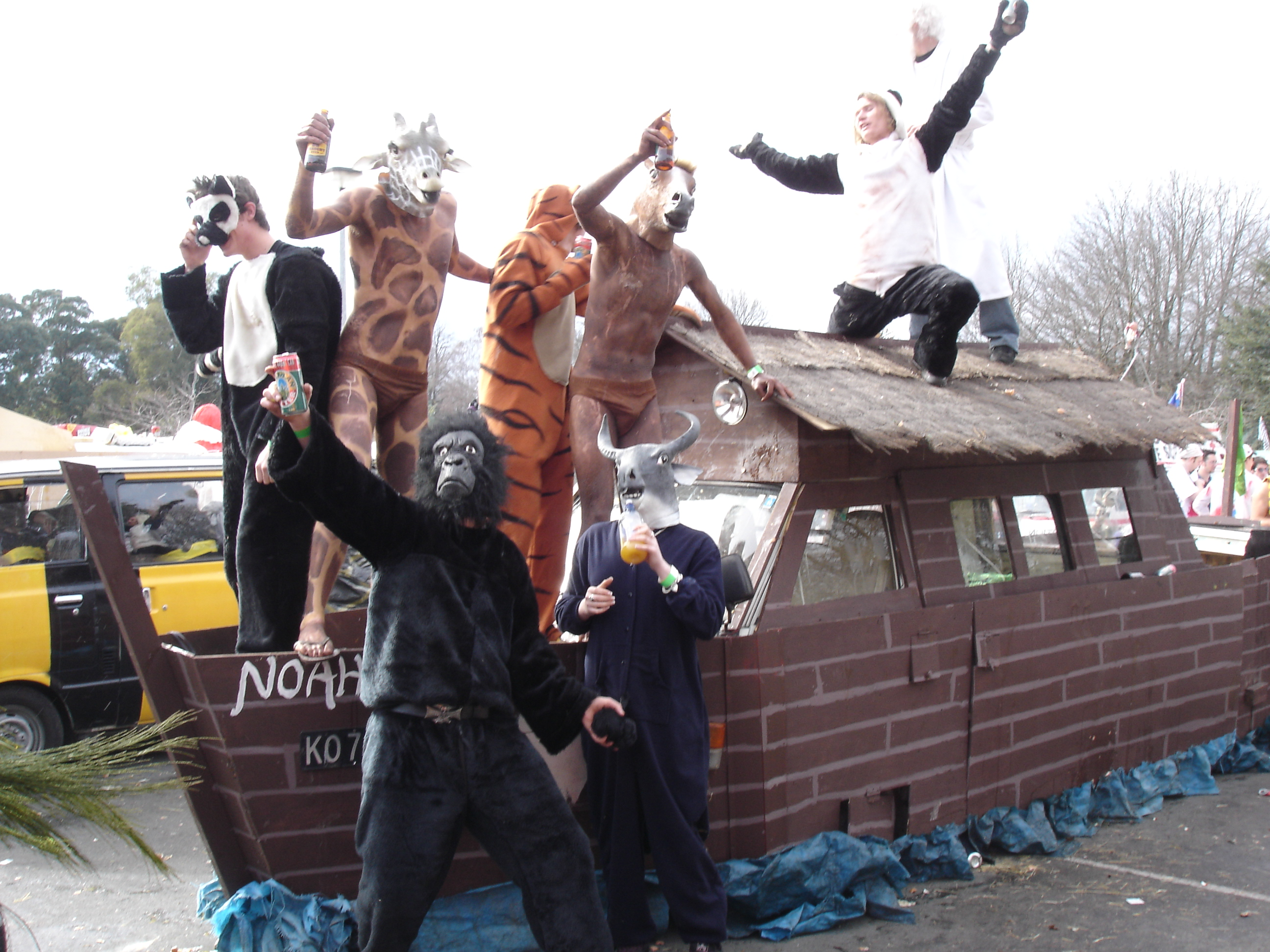
2006 Undie 500 entry "Noah's Ark", winner best overall

The Undie 500, originally named the Under 500, was an annual student-run car rally between Christchurch and Dunedin, New Zealand with multiple stops at drinking establishments along the way. The name comes from the original rule that the vehicle must be purchased for less than NZ$500, and optionally decorated. The event ran from 1988 to 2009 and was organised by ENSOC, the engineering society at the University of Canterbury.

== About the event ==
The premise of the event was for student members of ENSOC to purchase and decorate a vehicle before rallying the cars to Dunedin. The vehicles were individually themed and occupants undertook a pub crawl over the entire day of driving. This event was characterised by the high level of work performed on the entrants' cars; transforming them from normal motor vehicles into something unique.

The event was originally to coincide with the weekend of the annual Canterbury University Engineers v Otago Surveyors rugby match. At this time and well into the 1990s it was known as the "Under 500". Somewhere along the way it has been transformed into the "Undie 500", presumably to establish a similar-sounding name to the more famous Indy 500.

Since 2003, the number of vehicles was limited to 150. The event used to attract more than 1,000 participants and thousands of spectators. The event was widely reported, attracting national TV news coverage, newspaper, radio and has even featured in Ralph magazine. The New Zealand Police accompany the convoy throughout the trip to ensure both the safety of participants and other road users.

From 2006, when others driving cars not associated with the event began travelling to Dunedin concurrently and rioting, the event received much negative publicity due to rioting students and others associated with the event. Some were charged with offenses including offensive language and breaching the liquor ban the Dunedin City Council had placed.

After the 2009 event, the head of the University of Canterbury Students' Association (UCSA) noted that they could not "exert authority on those hangers-on or those other students and young people that head to Dunedin to use this as an excuse for violence or anti-social behaviour.", and that it was no longer in the interest of students to be associated with those who were causing trouble after the event. Consequently, the 2009 head of the UCSA predicted ENSOC could not run a further event to Dunedin in light of the trouble that would be caused by those non-students who would use it as an excuse for violence and other anti-social behaviour, but appeared not to rule out a similar event heading to a different destination.

Many in Dunedin saw the event as having been sensationalised by the media, with one local noting the "local newspaper will start printing stories a week in advance, and will continue for a week after the event, even if it runs smoothly."

== Rules ==
Cars were expected to meet the following requirements:

- Have a current Warrant of Fitness and Vehicle registration
- Be driven by a sober driver

In previous years it was also a requirement to have a vehicle under the price of $500, hence the name UNDIE 500. However, due to rising prices and stricter regulations this rule was later overlooked.

== Prizes ==
Before embarking for Dunedin, cash prizes were awarded for outstanding entries including:

- Best Car
- Best Dressed Team
- Best Mechanical Car
- Best Structural Car
- Best Engineered Car
- Most Politically Incorrect Car
- Best Overall

== Notable events ==
=== 1994 ===
The winner of best dressed vehicle in 1994 was a 1964 HD Holden Special station wagon cleverly transformed into Thomas the Tank Engine. It featured in an article on the Under 500 in The Timaru Herald newspaper. That year there was a bad snow storm on the Kilmog hill, just north of Dunedin. The local police stopped many of the cars on their way up the hill due to the icy conditions. This vehicle was allowed through as it was explained to the officer, "This is a train, not a car".

=== 2006 ===
The 2006 event was marred by drunken rioting in the Castle St area of Dunedin; resulting in 30 arrests and a liquor ban subsequently imposed on the main student area over the events weekend. After the incident ENSOC worked with the various local authorities in Ashburton, Timaru, Oamaru and Dunedin to minimise any possible disruption caused to local residents, including paying the Dunedin City Council to tow away any abandoned vehicles.

=== 2007 ===
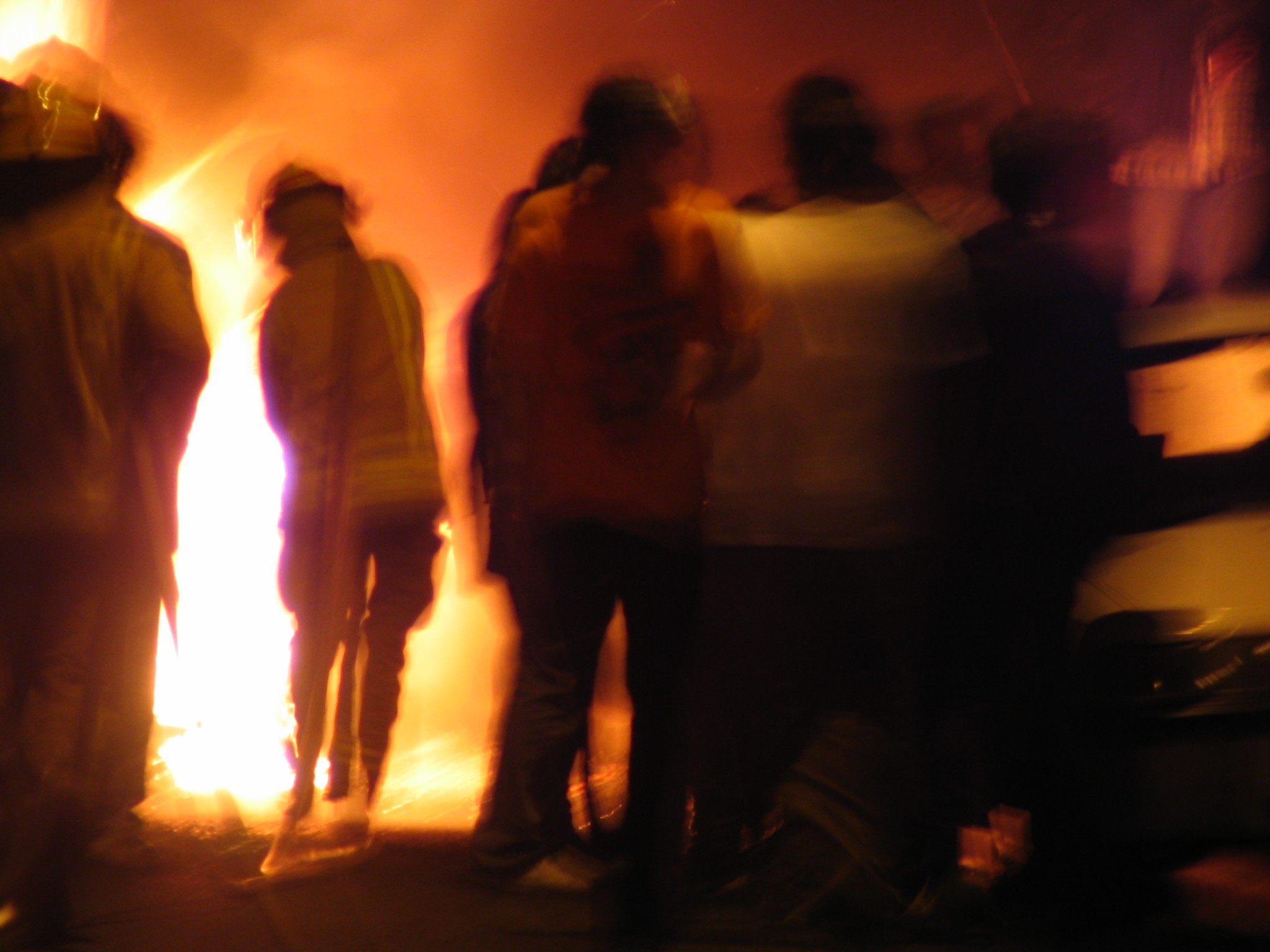
Two members of the New Zealand Fire Service dousing an Undie 500 fire on Grange Street in 2007

In 2007 the event saw further drunken rioting in which 69 people were arrested, on a night which one student involved described it as "a usual Dunedin Saturday night", while Dunedin emergency service workers said it was the city's worst trouble for many years. Crowd estimates were 1,000 – 2,000 at the height of the riots. Couches, a mattress and at least two Undie 500 cars were torched on Castle, Dundas, Hyde, Grange, and Leith streets, and police and fire-fighters were pelted with bottles. 9 of the 24 University of Canterbury students arrested were officially registered on the Undie 500, along with 30 Dunedin students and 15 non-students. Subsequently, there have been calls for an end to the event, with the Mayor of Dunedin Peter Chin calling the event 'history'.

In response to the rioting, police upgraded charges from disorderly behaviour to the more serious crime of rioting for 21 of the 69 arrested people, which could have resulted in up to 2 years in prison. These charges were later dropped by the police, with ten offenders pleading guilty and six pleading not guilty to lesser offences, resulting in at least one conviction for fifteen people. Furthermore, University of Otago students involved in the rioting also risked being expelled from the university. 31 people were charged at the Dunedin District Court, 22 being convicted (9 on two charges), and 5 receiving diversion. One charge of disorderly likely to cause violence was upheld on appeal to the High Court. The people convicted were forced to pay fines, reparations, donations and court costs exceeding $16,500 (up to $2,000 for some individuals), and received 250 hours community service, in addition to lawyers fees estimated at up to $1,000 to $5,000 each.

=== 2008 ===
Chin later said he expected the event would go ahead for 2008, though he soon pulled out of meetings with ENSOC and emergency services. ENSOC had submitted a management plan with bonds and behavioural guarantees for participants, and had planned for a concert for the Saturday night after the official event, which has been the scene of the rioting in recent years. Meetings had been held with concert promoters with the aim of organizing a large event with a budget of over $100,000. Without approval, ENSOC are refusing to condone the 'underground' Undie 500 that they expect to occur.

In 2008 the official event was cancelled, but around 100 students from the University of Canterbury travelled to Dunedin in about 40 cars and vans. More than 100 police were rostered on for the event, and had placed checkpoints on the outskirts of Rolleston and the entrance to Dunedin city. The media once again reported the event sparked violence, with police in full riot gear three times charging a group of around 500 students throwing rocks and bottles, before dispersing the crowd in the early hours of 24 August 2008. While police Inspector Dave Campbell noted that the event was not a catalyst for the trouble, with most of those arrested from Otago University or non-students, he also said that to those persons "It's quite clear that it [the Undie 500] is seen as a magnet." Around 30 arrests were made, in addition to 3 University of Canterbury and 2 University of Otago students from the previous night.

=== 2009 ===
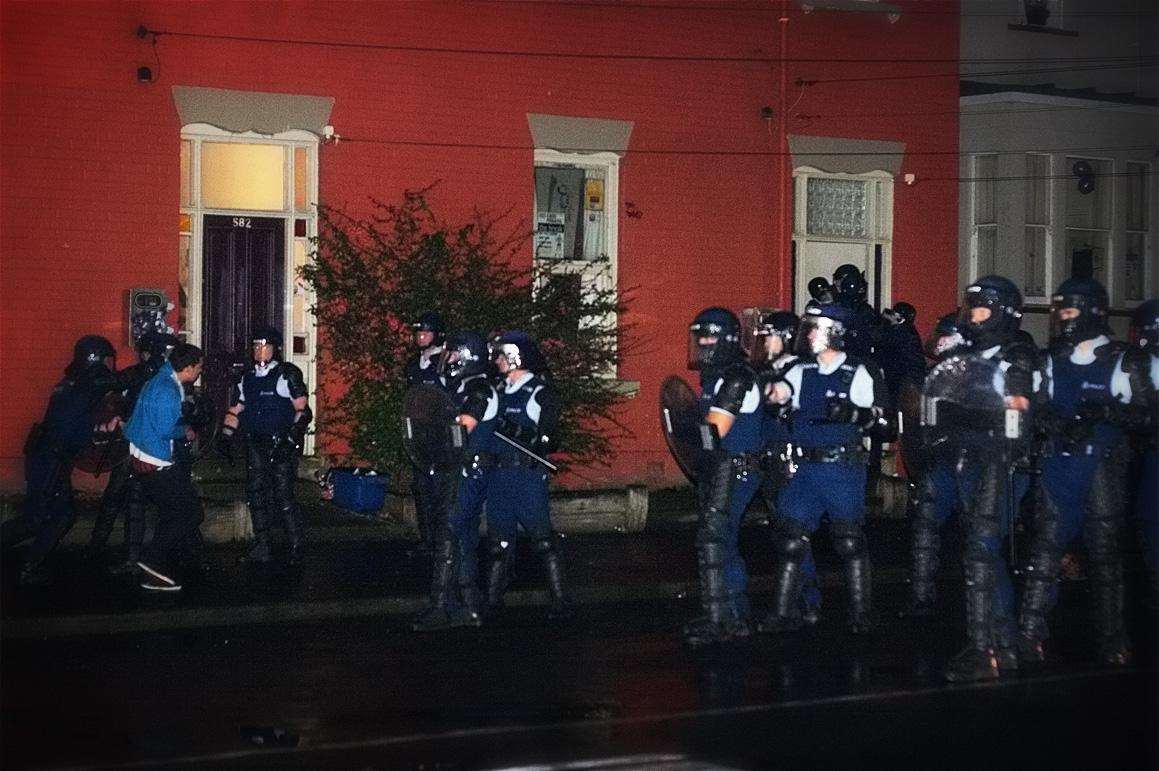
A man is arrested during riots after the 2009 Undie 500

An official ENSOC charity event ran in 2009, after Dunedin Mayor Peter Chin refused to negotiate with the University of Canterbury Students Association and ENSOC to organise events after the main Undie rally to minimise disorder afterwards. About 600 students from Canterbury participated, bringing more than 1000 cans of food for Dunedin food banks. The "Undie Charity Drive" has been criticised by Chin as "no matter how it is dressed up it is just a pub crawl." While the rally featured decorated cars, costumes and alcohol, new measures such as a good behaviour bond were introduced to address previous concerns. These measures, could, however, only be used to control behaviour by Canterbury University students, not Otago University students or the unemployed.

Oamaru, through which the event passes, was "proactive" (according to their community constable), and organised to deal with any increased littering or other anti-social behaviour as a result of the event. The town experienced no major problems, with only two arrests.

The event ran successfully, with partying afterwards becoming chaotic as police in riot gear moved in to be pelted with bottles, bricks and bicycle parts. Over two nights 80 arrests were made – around 80% University of Otago students, 10% University of Canterbury students, and 10% not students. In response to the disorder, Chin blamed Christchurch students. Police charged 67 people with a range of offences including breaching the temporary liquor ban, disorderly behaviour, obstruction and burning couches. Prime Minister John Key described the incident as "madness" and pointed out some students would consequently graduate with criminal convictions.

In the aftermath, OUSA president Edwin Darlow pointed out that as there was no way to stop the event, the council should consider alternative events over the weekend to reduce disorder after it finishes, though Chin has consistently refused to consider options ENSOC has proposed. Bystanders complained of being pepper sprayed by police in their own doorways. An 18-year-old Telford Rural Polytechnic student who travelled from Balclutha, specifically to be part of the "Undie 500 weekend", fell onto a burning couch while trying to jump over it. He was taken to Dunedin Hospital suffering burns, and required surgery.

In response to the event police minister Judith Collins said on 3 News the rioters were "spoilt little rich kids, who think that they are going to be the future leaders of our country, and frankly if they are, God help us".

Charges against two of those arrested were withdrawn because police lacked valid evidence. On 14 September, the first three of those arrested appeared in court; one a Dunedin student, and two unemployed and employed persons respectively from Dunedin. The day after, a mill-hand and a process worker were convicted of breaching the liquor ban. Of those facing charges, 43 are tertiary students. The largest group was of 27 Otago University students, followed by 18 who are not tertiary students, six of whom were unemployed. On the 18th, one Otago student was convicted of theft for grabbing a police officers hat, valued at $80, for which he would later apologise to the officer. He was fined $500 with court costs of $130.

The harshest penalty imposed has been on a 41-year-old unemployed Dunedin man for breaching the City Council liquor ban. Eight people have had charges against them dropped for lack of evidence against them, and two discharged without conviction. One Dunedin student was suspended from the University for swearing at Dunedin University security staff, outside the University property, outside his flat.

=== 2010 ===
In the year 2010 the Undie 500 Charity Drive was denied a liquor licence for an event that included a concert in Seddon. The drive was subsequently cancelled in the aftermath of the 2010 Canterbury earthquake, and the funds set aside for it were used to help relief efforts.

=== 2011 ===
After several meetings between event organisers ENSOC, the Dunedin police, Christchurch and the Dunedin city council the event was organised as a pub crawl that left from the university and returned to Christchurch. The event was kept off Facebook and the ENSOC website in an effort to keep it out of the media's attention, removing the negative publicity that was normally associated with the event.

The event consisted of leaving from the university arts car park, as in previous years, then heading out to the first pub in Yaldhurst. Both the participants and police were well behaved. Following that the event continued further out on to the Canterbury plains, finally ending back at a pub in Templeton, just out of Christchurch.

== See also ==
- 24 Hours of LeMons
- Engineering Society
- Indy 500
- Little 500 – the original party weekend at Indiana University
