= Centre for European Studies =

Centre for European Studies is the name of several organisations involved in the field of European studies:

- The Minda de Gunzburg Center for European Studies, at Harvard University
- The Centre for European Studies (think tank), the official foundation of the European People's Party
- The Centre for European Studies, at Aberystwyth University
- The Centre for European Studies, at Bifröst University, Iceland
- The Centre for European Studies, at Chulalongkorn University, Bangkok, Thailand
- The Centre for European Studies, at University of Salerno, Italy
- The Centre for European Studies of University College London
- The Manipal Centre for European Studies of Manipal University, in Karnataka, India
- The College of Europe, Bruges, Belgium
- Centre d'études européennes de Strasbourg (Center for European Studies, CEES) of the University of Strasbourg
- Centro Studi d'Europa (Europe Study Centre), Rome, Italy

Centre for European Studies may also refer to:

- The Centre for European Policy Studies, a think tank based in Brussels, Belgium
- The Research Centre for East European Studies of the University of Bremen
- The Institute of European Studies of the Jagiellonian University
