= Integrated engineering =

Integrated Engineering is a degree program (and similar concept programs such as Interdisciplinary and Multidisciplinary Engineering) combining aspects from traditional engineering studies and liberal arts, meant to prepare graduates for multi-disciplinary and project-based workplaces. Integrated engineers acquire background in core disciplines such as: materials, solid mechanics, fluid mechanics, and systems involving chemical, electro-mechanical, biological and environmental components. In the United States, an alliance of Integrated - type programs has been formed called the Alliance for Integrated Engineering (A4IE).

== Academia and Accreditation ==
=== Institutions ===
Currently, the following academic institutions are known to offer Integrated Engineering programs:

Canada

- Brock University
- University of British Columbia
- University of Western Ontario

UK

- The New Model Institute for Technology and Engineering (NMITE)
- University of Bath
- University of Cardiff
- University of Liverpool
- University of Nottingham
- Anglia Ruskin University
- University Centre Peterborough

United States

- Arizona State University
- Florida International University
- Lafayette College
- Lehigh University
- Southern Utah University
- Minnesota State University, Mankato (Iron Range Engineering)
- Texas A&M University
- University of Alabama at Birmingham
- University of Texas at El Paso (E-Lead Program)
- University of San Diego
- Wake Forest University
- Washington and Lee University

Germany

- Baden-Wuerttemberg Cooperative State University (DHBW)
- South Westphalia University of Applied Sciences

Estonia

- Tallinn University of Technology

Korea

- Chung-Ang University

Trinidad and Tobago

- University of Trinidad and Tobago

Thailand

- Chiang Mai University

=== Canada ===
Integrated Engineering originated at the University of Western Ontario in Ontario, Canada and in 2000 the Applied Science Faculty of the University of British Columbia also began a degree program for Integrated Engineering.

In Canada, the program has been fully accredited by the Canadian Engineering Accreditation Board and engineers are able to obtain a Professional Engineer (P.Eng) Certificate.

=== United Kingdom ===
In 1988, the Engineering Council UK, identified the need for routes to qualification for Chartered (Professional) Engineers that:

meet the identified needs of industry, increase access to engineering education by more students, provide a balanced curriculum combining the subjects that engineers use most often and directed towards the needs of the majority of engineers.

This is the fundamental definition for Integrated Engineering.

The qualities looked for by industry when recruiting graduates were identified as:

flexibility and broad education, ability to understand non engineering functions, ability to solve problems, knowledge of the principles of engineering and ability to apply them in practical situations, information skills, experience of project work, especially cross linked projects, ability to work as a member of a team, presentation and communication skills.

Engineering Council UK, 1988, An Integrated Engineering Degree Programme. Engineering Council UK, 1988, Admissions to Universities - Action to increase the supply of engineers.

Following open competition for additional funding provided by the UK Department for Technology and Industry, and industrial supporters including British Petroleum, six universities were selected from thirty three applicants. Four "Pilot Programmes" were launched at Cardiff University, Nottingham Trent University, Portsmouth University and Sheffield Hallam University.

In 1989, The Nottingham Trent University (UK) admitted students to first of the Engineering Council's new Integrated Engineering Degree Programme courses. The course was accredited, at the CEng and European Engineer level, by the Institutions of Mechanical Engineers, Electrical Engineers and Manufacturing Engineers.

Generic engineering programmes are common. Integrated Engineering is distinct through emphasizing the development of personal competencies, especially the ability of students to work within groups. It is design led, and integration of all the subjects of study is a defining characteristic, achieved partly through the medium of project based learning.

Following the successful experience at The Nottingham Trent University, Integrated Engineering programmes were established in 1993, at selected universities in Bulgaria and Hungary, with the aid of European Union funding granted under the Tempus Programme.

In University of Liverpool, the Integrated Engineering Program is accredited by the Institution of Mechanical Engineers and the Institution of Electrical Engineers, and can lead to Chartered Engineer status.

In Anglia Ruskin University, the Integrated Engineering Program is accredited by the Institution of Engineering and Technology, and can lead to Incorporated Engineer status.

=== United States ===
In the U.S. there are several Integrated engineering education programs.

Southern Utah University requires its students to pass the Fundamentals of Engineering exam (FE) before they graduate; and received ABET accreditation in 2004 that extended retroactively through October 2003. The graduates are also able to obtain a Professional Engineer (P.E.) license.

Minnesota State University, Mankato has developed a collaborative Integrated engineering program to provide engineering education at MNSCU Community Colleges in the Northern Higher Education District in former Iron Range communities. This partnership allows students to stay near home, while earning a bachelor of science in integrated engineering while focusing on local engineering needs of manufacturers and businesses. As part of the program students are also required to sit for the FE examination prior to graduation and are eligible to sit for the P.E. exam license as the program is also ABET accredited.

=== Germany ===
In Germany the [(Baden-Wuerttemberg Cooperative State University (DHBW))] introduced a flexible M.Eng. program in 2015, to fit to the industrial demand for generally educated engineers for Integrated Industry, known as Industry 4.0 in Germany. The graduated school program "Integrated Engineering" is administered at the Center for Advances Studies in Heilbronn and requires at least two years professional experience as an engineer for admission.

=== Korea ===
In Korea the Department of Integrative Engineering at Chung-Ang University aims to develop human resources that will contribute to building a knowledge infrastructure by effectively responding to rapid educational and social changes.

The department focuses on developing fundamental and application technologies by converging technologies and, through a global network, on coordinate research activities with other institutions at the university. To accomplish the goals, curriculum is structured around an integrated engineering model, the department will provide students with training in independent research methods who are equipped with initiative research abilities.

=== Trinidad and Tobago ===
The Bachelor of Applied Science (B.A.S.c) and Master of Engineering (M.Eng) programs in Utilities Engineering was validated in December 2008 at the University of Trinidad and Tobago. These programs are geared towards the Electrical and Mechanical engineering disciplines that exist within the broad area of Integrated Engineering.

Prior to the introduction of the programs most of the engineers in the utilities sector were specialized in one branch of engineering mainly Electrical or Mechanical. The sector required an engineer who was multi-skilled and versed in both disciplines. The Utilities Engineer therefore performs a wide range of maintenance and operational duties in the following industries:

Process Industry, Electric Utilities (generation, distribution and efficient utilization), Transportation Industry, Processing and Manufacturing Industry, Water and sanitation industry, Mining and Smelting Industry, Renewable and Green Energy Industry.

== See also ==
- University of Western Ontario
- University of British Columbia
- Engineering Undergraduate Society of the University of British Columbia
- Southern Utah University
- Chung-Ang University
