= International Association of Engineers =

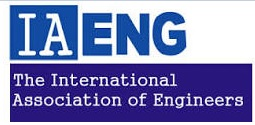
- Founded: 1968; 58 years ago
- Type: Learned society
- Legal status: Nonprofit organization
- Purpose: Engineers and computer scientists
- Location: Hong Kong, China
- Region served: Global
- Method: Conferences, Journals & Societies
- Members: 140,000+ (May 2014)
- Website: www.iaeng.org

The International Association of Engineers (IAENG) is a non-profit international association for engineers and computer scientists. IAENG was founded by a group of engineers and computer scientists in 1968, originally as a private club network for its founding members. Nowadays, IAENG has its secretariat office in Hong Kong with more than 140,000 members (May 2014) and holds the annual congress World Congress on Engineering for the engineering research communities.

The association is a promoter of the open-access publications. All of its current publications have adopted the open-access policy, including its popular title Engineering Letters. The association also cooperates with publishers like Springer, American Institute of Physics and World Scientific Publishing etc. to publish the book series IAENG Transactions on Engineering Technologies.
