= European Association for Structural Dynamics =

The European Association for Structural Dynamics (EASD) is a professional body founded in 1990 to bring together members of structural dynamics community from all over Europe.

== Activities ==
EASD oversees the organization of the European Conferences on Structural Dynamics (EURODYN) that will be held at three (or four) year intervals. These conferences shall be devoted to theoretical developments and applications of structural dynamics to all types of structures and structural materials.
