= Institute of European Studies of the Jagiellonian University =

The Institute of European Studies is a unit of the Jagiellonian University, having its roots in the Inter-Faculty Department for European Studies which was founded in 1993. It was the first university Institute in Poland committed to the study of European integration.

The primary seat of the Institute is ul. Romana Ingardena 3, 30-060, with a smaller Centre for European Studies on ul Garbarska in the city centre.

The JU Institute of European Studies is a partner institution of the Europaeum.

== Structure ==
- Centre for European Culture and Society
- Centre for European Heritage
- Centre for European Philosophy
- Centre for the EU Political System
- Department of Central European History and Culture
- Department of European History
- Department of the EU Financial System
- Central and Eastern European Studies
- European Consultation Centre

The Institute is closely connected with the JU Centre for Holocaust Studies and shares one seat with the Centre. The Centre for Holocaust Studies is the only university institution in Kraków committed to the study of the Holocaust. Before the Centre was established, Holocaust Studies Department was a part of the Institute of European Studies.

The Centre cooperates with main Holocaust Studies institutions in the world, including Yad Vashem and the Auschwitz-Birkenau concentration camp. International Summer School "Teaching the Holocaust" is organised in cooperation with the American Jewish University.

== Study programmes ==
The Institute conducts a wide range of study programmes in Polish and in English, including MA programmes in European Studies, European Governance, Euroculture or Economy, State and Society, many of them organised in cooperation with foreign partner institutions.

== Press ==
- Forum Europejskie [The European Forum]
- Problemy Współczesnego Prawa Międzynarodowego, Europejskiego i Porównawczego [The Problems of Contemporary International, European and Comparative Law]

== Research Projects ==
- RECON – Reconstituting Democracy in Europe
- Why should we teach about the Holocaust?
- La place, un patrimoine européen
- European Curriculum for Children of Migrant Workers
- Website Guide to Tolerance Education
- Migracja wahadłowa a procesy europeizacji i konstruowania tożsamości europejskiej
- Nauczanie o Holokauście – Szkoła Letnia dla Nauczycieli
- Erasmus Mundus Masters Courses and Scholarships

Completed research projects include: Multicultural Europe, Socrates-Comenius NIKE, Transnational identities – cities unbound – migrations redefined.

Main research tasks of the Centre for Holocaust Studies are: studies in post-Holocaust symbolic representations; mutated memories of Holocaust as a social process; studies in Holocaust tourism and pilgrimages; sociology of murderers, bystanders, helpers and collaborators; Holocaust museums studies; legal dimension of the Holocaust exterminations .

== See also ==
- European Studies
