= Union of Chambers of Turkish Engineers and Architects =

Technical organization of Turkey

Union of Chambers of Turkish Engineers and Architects Türk Mühendis ve Mimar Odaları Birliği
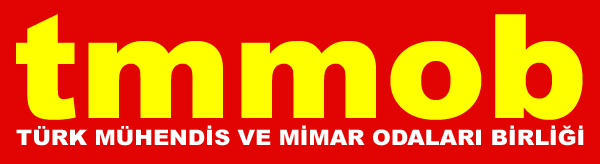
- Abbreviation: TMMOB
- Formation: 1954
- Type: NGO
- Purpose: Professional (engineers and architects)
- Headquarters: Ankara, Turkey
- Members: Chambers of engineers and architects
- General Secretary: Emin Koramaz
- Website: www.tmmob.org.tr

The Union of Chambers of Turkish Engineers and Architects (Turkish: Türk Mühendis ve Mimar Odaları Birliği, TMMOB for short) is a confederation of all chambers of architects and engineers in Turkey. The union was "established in 1954 by the Law 7303 and the Decree-Laws 66 and 85 amending of the Law 6235" and "is a corporate body and a professional organization defined in the form of a public institution as stated in the Article 135 of the Turkish Constitution." As of end 2013, the union represents 24 chambers with a total membership of 445,365. It is headquartered in Kızılay, Ankara.

Its national leadership states that TMMOB and its member Chambers "accept that the problems of the profession and the colleagues cannot be separated from the general problems of the people and the country" and, therefore, they "are anti-imperialist and oppose the New World Order theories, racism and reactionism", and "implement democratic centralist methods in the formation and implementation of the policies" as listed among "Fundamental Principles" of the organization.

In July 2013 the Justice and Development Party rushed through a bill removing TMMOB's role in approving urban development proposals, apparently in response to TMMOB's support of the 2013 protests in Turkey.

== Members ==
Name of the chamber	Name in Turkish	Foundation year	External link
Agriculture engineers	Ziraat mühendisleri	1954	
Architects	Mimarlar	1954	
Chemical engineers	Kimya mühendisleri	1954	
Civil engineers	İnşaat mühendisleri	1954	
Electrical engineers	Elektrik mühendisleri	1954	
Forestry engineers	Orman mühendisleri	1954	
Mechanical engineers	Makina mühendisleri	1954	
Mining engineers	Maden mühendisleri	1954	
Naval architectures and marine engineers	Gemi mühendisleri	1954	
Survey engineers	Harita kadastro mühendisleri	1954	
Marine engineers	Gemi makinaları mühendisleri	1960	
Urban planners	Şehir plancıları	1968	
Petroleum engineers	Petrol mühendisleri	1970	
Physics engineers	Fizik mühendileri	1970	
Metallurgical engineers	Metalurji mühendisleri	1970	
Meteorology engineers	Meteoroloji mühendisleri	1970	
Geology engineers	Jeoloji mühendisleri	1974	
Interior architects	İç mimarlar	1976	
Geophysics engineers	Jeofizik mühendisleri	1986	
Environmental engineers	Çevre mühendisleri	1992	
Textile engineers	Tekstil mühendisleri	1992	
Landscape architects	Peyzaj mimarları	1994	
Food engineers	Gıda mühendisleri	1996	
Computer engineers	Bilgisayar mühendisleri	2012	
