= Robert Scott (engineer) =

New Zealand railway engineer and professor of engineering

Robert Julian Scott MIME, MICE, FAIEE, NZSocCE (14 September 1861 – 8 November 1930) was a notable New Zealand railway engineer and professor of engineering. He was also the creator of possibly New Zealand's first indigenous steam buggy in 1881.

== Background ==
He was born in Plymouth, Devonshire, England, on 14 September 1861. He was the son of Commander Robert Anthony Edwards Scott RN and Fanny Mary Julian, and a cousin of Antarctic explorer Robert Falcon Scott. On 22 October 1889, Scott married Gertrude Elizabeth Bowen, the daughter of Georgina Eliza Markham and Charles Bowen. Although they had no children, Scott served as guardian and mentor to Peter Phipps, who later became a Vice Admiral.

== Education, career, and designs ==
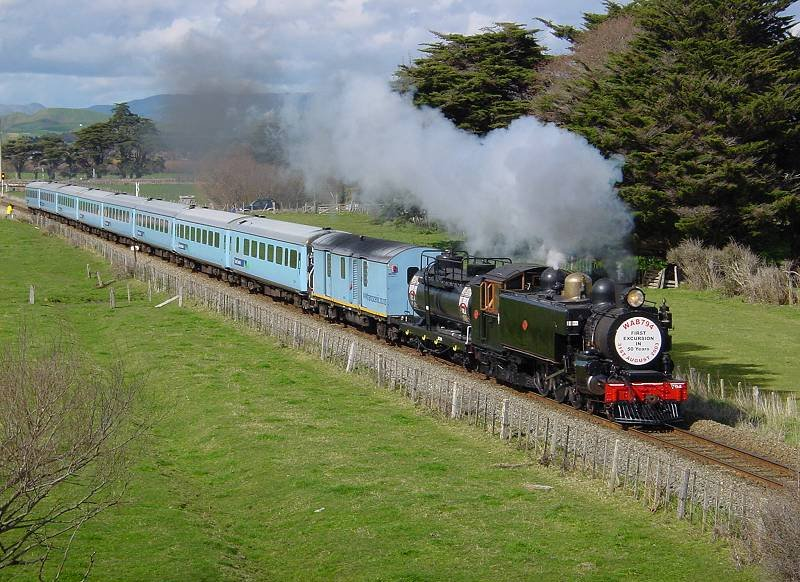
Wab class steam locomotive

Scott was educated at Abbey School, Beckenham, Kent; King's College London and the Royal School of Mines. On leaving school he worked in the locomotive department of the London, Brighton and South Coast Railway where he was trained by William Stroudley. In 1880 he went to New Zealand worked for the New Zealand government railways firstly as a draughtsman and then as an engineer.

In 1881 he designed and had built a 35-horsepower steam buggy by Cutten and Co, Dunedin. The steam buggy was designed to carry ten passengers, and was the first New Zealand designed and built powered passenger vehicle.

Scott also designed a prototype insulated frozen-meat wagon in the mid-1880s, the "V" and "W" class locomotives, and New Zealand's first oil engine. By the age of 26 he was the General Manager of the Government's Addington Railway Workshops in Christchurch.

== Canterbury University College ==
When Canterbury University College (now the University of Canterbury) set up its Department of Engineering in 1887, Scott became one of its part-time lecturers. In August 1889, Scott was offered an engineering post in the New Zealand Railways Department's head office in Wellington. To retain Scott, the university offered him a full-time position in charge of the School of Engineering, which he accepted, and he took up the position in November 1889.

As head, Scott began the development of the School of Engineering. In 1902, he was elected to the University of New Zealand senate, representing Canterbury.

He even declined a salary increase to ensure the building of a mechanical engineering laboratory. The laboratory was completed in 1891 and fully equipped by 1894. On his retirement on 28 February 1923, Scott was honoured by the title professor emeritus.

== Other ==
Scott's Chairman of a Royal Commission's on Railway rolling stock and Tramways, and Commission's on the Addington Railway Workshops, and wartime munitions. He was granted a seat on the university's professorial council in 1890 and became its chairman in 1893. In 1903 he sat on the University of New Zealand senate, a post he held until his retirement.

Scott was also a keen yachtsman and marine designer. He was one of the founders of the Royal Port Nicholson Yacht Club. His sailing and design prowess became apparent in the 1888 when Scott with a group of friends acquired an old yacht Fleetwing, upgraded it, and won a number of races.

He died of heart failure in Christchurch on 8 November 1930, having suffered from long periods of ill health over a number of years.

== Notes and references ==
=== References ===
- Palmer, A. N.; Stewart, W. W. (1965). Cavalcade of New Zealand Locomotives. Wellington: A H. & A W. Reed. ISBN 978-0-207-94500-7.
