= Society of Professional Engineers UK =

The Society of Professional Engineers (SPE) was established the United Kingdom in 1969, to promote the interests of skilled engineers in all the main branches of Engineering.

The main objective of the Society is to enhance the status of trained and experienced professional engineers in the absence in the UK of any legal protection for the title "Engineer". The founding members believed that this was necessary, as "Engineer" can be used by anyone in the UK, whether or not trained or experienced. This remains a priority for the Society.

The Society created and maintains a Register of Engineers who can demonstrate knowledge and competence in engineering. Applicants who meet the Society's criteria for membership may use the designation "P.Eng".

The Society of Professional Engineers traces its origins to the Society of Engineers UK, which was founded in 1854 as a learned society. On 27 October, 1969, a number of the Society of Engineers' Corporate members formed the Society of Professional Engineers. (The original Society of Engineers was integrated in 2005 into the Institution of Incorporated Engineers, itself merging with the Institution of Electrical Engineers in 2006 to form the Institution of Engineering and Technology, the biggest professional engineering body in Europe).

The Society is a Company Limited by Guarantee, registered in England, and its Memorandum and Articles of Association were approved by the UK Government's former Department of Trade and Industry, now Department for Business, Innovation and Skills. Its legal objects are:

- To promote the high standards of expertise and professionalism in the practice of engineering, for the benefit of those members of the general public who need to avail themselves of the services of engineers.

In September 2018 the SPEng(UK) was absorbed by the UK Institution of Engineering and Technology-UK IET

- To promote the development of inventions and improvements in the practice of engineering and to disseminate information on matters affecting the practice of engineering so as to bring the results of research and considerations of good practice into the public domain.
- To promote improvements in the laws relating to matters of engineering practice so that members of the public may be better able to rely on the highest standards of advice and practice in those who purport to be professional engineers.

The Society keeps a register of persons who subscribe to the Society and who, in the eyes of the Society, 'have proved their competence and can be accurately described as Professional Engineers', awarding them the 'PEng MSPE' (member) or 'PEng FSPE' (fellow) designation according to qualifications and experience Getting in is tough, but can prove rewarding if trying to excel in areas such as proving an invention.

The SPEng (or SPE) has signed a Mutual Agreement with the Société Nationale des Ingénieurs Professionnels de France (SNIPF) SNIPF is a French Professional Engineering body recognised by the European Commission for issuing certificates of competence to French Professional Engineers.

The SPEng (UK) was absorbed by the IET (Institution of Engineering & Technology) in July 2018. http://www.professionalengineers-uk.org
