= Building transportation systems =

Building transportation systems include:

- Elevator
- Escalator
- Moving walkway
- Paternoster elevator
