= Institution of Mechanical Engineers (India) =

Indian professional body

The Institution of Mechanical Engineers (India) (IME India) is the professional body for mechanical engineers in Kharghar, India. Founded in 1914.

== Certifications ==
Certificates issued on successful completion of its bi-annual examination are equivalent to a Degree according to the Supreme Court.
