= Society of EMC Engineers (India) =

- Established: 1987
- Type: Electromagnetic compatibility professional association
- Headquarters: Bangalore, India
- Key people: Dr. D. C. Pande, Chairman
- Website: www.semceindia.org

The 'Society of EMC Engineers (India) (SEMCEI) is a professional society for engineers working on the subject of ElectroMagnetic Interference / ElectroMagnetic Compatibility (EMI/EMC) in India.
