= Caspian Engineers Society =

Turkish non-profit organisation

- Abbreviation: CES
- Formation: 2007
- Legal status: Registered society
- Purpose: Spread out `engineering culture` across the Caspian region.
- Location(s): Branches in Azerbaijan and Turkey
- Region served: Caspian Region, Turkey
- Members: 150+
- Executive Chairman: Lachin Alakbarov
- Main organ: Board of Directors
- Website: CES

The Caspian Engineers Society (CES) is non-profit organisation. Further aim is to promote engineering awareness among the public that will drive "Be Engineer" movement and spark the interest of young generation in engineering.

== Main Objectives ==
- Develop regional engineering network to share knowledge and experience;
- Bridge between management and engineering community within companies;
- Develop cooperation between science and industrial organisations in the region;
- Bring international engineering standards to the region;
- Raise public awareness in different engineering subjects;
- Increase professional development of local engineers;
- Develop “Be Engineer” philosophy in the region;
- Develop ideas to transform Caspian countries into major industrial region;
- Provide engineering support to NGOs in the region.

== History ==
In November 2007, a group of young engineers came together to discuss some career, education issues and share concerns among each other. That meeting was the start point of the Caspian Engineers Society. First meetings were unofficial, but in further meetings it was decided to establish a non-profit organization consisting of volunteers which aimed to:

- Support young engineers and scientists to be technically expert in their fields;
- Support industry development in terms of technology and engineering areas;
- Spread out `engineering culture` across the Caspian region, etc.

== Membership Types ==
Caspian Engineers Society offers following two membership types:

- Professional Membership for professional engineers.
- Student Membership for students studying engineering.

== Achievements ==
- The 1st Professional Engineering Organization within the region;
- 2009 BP Annual Engineering Award winner on the “People Development” nomination;
- 2010 Institute of Chemical Engineers (UK Engineering Council) Annual Awards – Highly Commended on the “Education and Training” nomination;
- The 3rd International Scientific and Practical Conference “Scientific-Technical Creativity of Youth in the knowledge –based society” held in Moscow in 2011;
- 75+ technical events during the recent 4 years;
- 2600+ students and young engineers attended events.

== Founders ==
- Elkhan Bashirov;
- Elnur Yusifov;
- Lachin Alakbarov;
- Rufat Azizov;
- Shahin Teymurkhanli;
- Vugar Samadli.

== Past Executive Chairmen ==
- Lachin Alakbarov (2012);
- Rufat Azizov (2011).

== Supporters ==
- Rashid Javanshir, President of BP Azerbaijan – Georgia – Turkey Regional Unit;
- Hamlet Isakhanli, Head of Board of Trustees of Khazar University;
- Ahmet Sanich, Rector of Qafqaz University;
- Chris Houghton, Engineering Authority of BP Azerbaijan – Georgia – Turkey Regional Unit;
- Vagif Abbasov, Correspondence Member of National Academy of Science of Azerbaijan Republic.

== Partners ==
- BP Caspian
- Qafqaz University
- Khazar University
- Ministry of Youth and Sport of the Republic of Azerbaijan
- SOCAR
- Azersun Holding
- Azercell
- Nord Media

== See also ==
- Engineering
- List of engineering societies
- Engineering societies
- Chemical engineering
- Computer engineering
- Mechanical engineering
- Electrical engineering
