= American Society of Plumbing Engineers =

International organization

The American Society of Plumbing Engineers (ASPE) is the international organization for professionals skilled in the design, specification and inspection of plumbing systems. The Society disseminates technical data and information, sponsors activities that facilitate interaction with fellow professionals, and, through research and education, expands the base of knowledge of the plumbing engineering industry. ASPE members are leaders in innovative plumbing design, effective materials and energy use, and the application of advanced techniques throughout the world.

== Membership ==
ASPE currently has 6,500 members. Internationally, ASPE members are located in the United States, Canada, Asia, Mexico, South and Central America, the South Pacific, Australia, Europe, Africa, Caribbean and the Middle East.

All members belong to ASPE worldwide and have the opportunity to belong to and participate in state, provincial, or local chapters throughout the U.S. and Canada. ASPE chapters provide the major communication links and the first line of services and programs for the individual member.

== Publications ==
The Society maintains a publishing program, spearheaded by the profession's basic reference text, the Plumbing Engineering Design Handbook. The Plumbing Engineering Design Handbook, published in four volumes, encompasses 50 chapters providing comprehensive details of the accepted practices and design criteria used in the field of plumbing engineering. ASPE's published library of professional technical manuals and handbooks includes the Domestic Water Heating Design Manual, Engineering Plumbing Design, and The Plumbing Engineering and Design Handbook of Tables, the only plumbing reference tool of its kind.

== Professional Certification ==
ASPE sponsors a national certification program for engineers and designers of plumbing systems, which carries the designation "Certified in Plumbing Design" or CPD. The certification program claims to provides the profession, the plumbing industry, and the general public with a single, comprehensive qualification of professional competence for engineers and designers of plumbing systems. The CPD tests hundreds of engineers and designers at centers throughout the United States annually. Created to provide a single, uniform, national credential in the field of engineered plumbing systems, the CPD program is not in any way connected to any state-regulated Professional Engineer (PE) registration.

== See also ==
- Engineering
- List of engineering societies
