= Engineering traditions in Canada =

Engineering traditions in Canada are diverse. Many of the traditions are practised at the engineering departments of Canadian universities, where student organisations continue to practise traditions started by other engineers in previous years.

== Calling of an Engineer ==
In the early 1920s, Professor H. E. T. Haultain of the University of Toronto wrote to Rudyard Kipling, who had made reference to the work of engineers in some of his poems and writings. He asked Kipling for his assistance in developing a suitably dignified obligation and ceremony for its undertaking. Kipling was very enthusiastic in his response and shortly produced both an obligation and a ceremony formally entitled "The Ritual of the Calling of an Engineer."

Kipling had long been the literary hero of engineers, having published the poem "The Sons of Martha" in 1907. In the poem, Kipling identifies engineers with Martha and her children, who continue to do the chores necessary to keep the household running rather than sit at the Lord's feet.

Although some later engineers would read Kipling's poem as condemning engineers to being second-class citizens compared to managers, those of Haultain's generation were pleased to take "The Sons of Martha" as their defining text.

== The Iron Ring ==
The first Iron Ring ceremony was held at the University of Toronto in 1925, with the first rings made of "hammered iron" that Kipling called "cold". Although some say the writer used the adjective because the structural material did not forgive the mistakes of engineers working in it, another poem of his puts it in a different and more positive context:

Gold is for the mistress - silver for the maid!
Copper for the craftsman cunning at his trade.
"Good!" said the Baron, sitting in his hall,
"But Iron - Cold Iron - is master of them all!"

The iron ring's circular shape has been said to symbolize the continuity of the profession and its methods and the circle is also an appropriate symbol of the iterative engineering design process. The original rings were said to have been fabricated from the wreckage of the Québec Bridge, which collapsed during construction in 1907. Although this is generally thought to be false, the Québec Bridge is still held as significant. That bridge, whose 1,800 foot main span was to be the largest cantilever structure in the world, collapsed under its own weight because of an error in the design engineer's calculations. The bridge was redesigned, but suffered a second accident in 1916, when its centre span fell while being hoisted into place. Finally, in 1917 the bridge was completed and stood across the St. Lawrence River as a symbolic gateway into Canada. The engineers sometimes regard the bridge as a reminder to Canadian engineers to take care with their designs and to persevere in the face of adversity.

== Licensing ==
Many engineering students become licensed Professional Engineers after graduation which gives them the right to practise in public. It is usually a structured 4 plus year period of work experience following graduation. Professional status entails both responsibilities as well as privileges, and is not, as some may think, the automatic result of graduation. In every province of Canada and every U.S. state, it is by law mandatory for an Engineer to be registered with the appropriate association before they may practise as a Professional Engineer. In Canada, registration as a Professional Engineer is granted only to those whose personal qualifications and professional experience, as well as academic training, can be proven to the satisfaction of their province. In order to protect the public, this is a matter of law and not choice. Upon graduation, engineering graduates are permitted to apply for the status as an Engineer-in-Training as the next step in becoming a fully qualified Professional Engineer. By law, only Professional Engineers can call themselves by the name "Professional Engineer", "Mechanical Engineer" and "Electrical Engineer" and their abbreviations. However, there are occasions where engineer may be loosely used to describe people working in the field of Engineering as Technologists, Technicians and Trades. For example, the Canadian Coast Guard and the Canadian Navy have "Marine Engineers", "Power Engineers", and "Military Engineers" terms only used within the organization, not publicly. "Locomotive Engineers" have been an integral part of the Canadian railroad industry since its inception.

In a related field, accreditation of baccalaureate programs in Computer Science and Management Information Systems are performed by the Canadian Information Processing Society, while Software Engineering can be accredited by both CIPS and the Canadian Engineering Accreditation Board. Some professionals in the software development field are as certified as Information Systems Professional (ISP) while others prefer to be accredited as a Professional Engineer under the discipline known as Software Engineering.

== Coveralls ==
At many universities, particularly in Ontario, engineering students may elect to obtain a pair of distinctive coveralls, known under various names depending on the university. For instance, they are named "Redsuits" at McMaster University, after their distinctive bright red hue, and "Flightsuits" at Carleton University, for their resemblance to fighter pilot flight suits. These coveralls are typically adorned with patches, which may represent an certain event the owner of the coveralls has partaken in, one of their interests, or simply for aesthetic reasons.

The method to obtain the coveralls varies by university. Some allow students to outright buy a pair through an undergraduate engineering society, while others make the process more exclusive, requiring them to be earned through being an orientation week leader or by collecting points earned by attending events throughout the academic year.

Many coverall owners trade limbs, pockets, and other pieces of fabric from their pair with students of other universities, leading to patchwork-style coveralls. Such coveralls are usually a symbol of a particularly well-acquainted student.

=== List of coverall colours by university ===
| Colour | School |
|---|---|
| Red | University of Calgary |
| Navy Blue | Carleton University |
| Yellow | Concordia University GNCTR |
| Royal Blue | University of Guelph |
| Black with white stripes | Lakehead University |
| Red | McMaster University |
| Maroon | University of New Brunswick |
| Royal Blue | Ontario Tech University |
| Navy Blue or Safety Orange^{a} | University of Ottawa |
| Navy Blue | University of Toronto |
| Sky Blue | Toronto Metropolitan University |
| Grey^{b} | University of Waterloo |
| Grey or Tan | University of Western Ontario |
| Cobalt Blue | University of Windsor |
| Red | York University |
| Tan | Conestoga College |

== Lady Godiva ==
At numerous engineering departments at Canadian universities, Lady Godiva is considered a mascot, sometimes called the "Patron Saint of Engineers" or "Goddess of Engineering", and is the subject of the traditional engineering drinking song "Godiva's Hymn". The University of Toronto and McMaster University hold annual "Godiva Weeks". In the past, engineering departments would sponsor a naked woman (or costumed man) to ride a horse across campus. The practice has declined in recent years.

== Pranks ==
Several engineering departments at Canadian university have a tradition of pulling technical pranks or practical jokes. Perhaps most famous amongst these is the hanging of a Volkswagen Beetle shell from the Golden Gate Bridge in San Francisco and Lions Gate Bridge in Vancouver, by engineering students at the University of British Columbia.

== Songs ==
Over the years engineering departments at universities in Canada have come up with various songs, some now obscure but others, such as the Engineers' Hymn, still in frequent use.

== Purple ==
The color purple plays a significant role in the traditions of engineering schools across Canada^{(which?)}. The tradition of purple representing engineering is commonly cited to the story of the sinking of the Titanic, in which the purple-clad Marine Engineers remained on board to delay the ship's sinking, though the legitimacy of this origin is questionable.

Purple is also the colour of the Engineering Corp in the British Military. It is common for engineers across schools in Canada to dye themselves (and their leather jackets, in the case of Queen's University engineers) purple using the medical dye Gentian Violet, especially during events such as Frosh Week, although the practice is being reviewed following reports by Health Canada of the dye being potentially carcinogenic.

== Notes ==
A. University of Ottawa coveralls are typically previously used for actual labour, meaning they can be of any colour. However, the most common colours are Navy Blue and Safety Orange.
B. Orientation leaders get a white pair of coveralls, which they then dye a colour matching their orientation week teams, making rarer colours like pink and yellow sought-after for limb trades.
