= Professional Engineers of Bangladesh =

The Board of Professional Engineers of Bangladesh (BPERB) was established on 11 January 2001 by an amendment to the constitution of the Institution of Engineers, Bangladesh and exists as an autonomous body with its own Board of Executives independent of IEB. The organization consists of various engineers and other professions.

Registration into the National Database of Licensed Engineers (Bangladesh) require sponsorship from three Fellows of IEB.

BPERB maintains established standards that need to be individually achieved by prospective engineers before being registered as a licensed engineer in Bangladesh. It adds the post-nominal title of PEng. It requires corporate membership, 7 years of full-time post graduate work experience and satisfaction of training objectives and testings as set by rule. The license also requires Continuing Professional Development (CPD) to maintain a license.
