= Chamber of Electrical Engineers of Turkey =

Engineering organization of Turkey

The Chamber of Electrical Engineers of Turkey (Turkish: Elektrik Mühendisleri Odası) was established in 1954. It is one of the 23 members of the confederation named Union of chambers of Turkish engineers and architects.

== Coverage ==
The chamber used to include electronics, telecommunication, computer and biomedical engineers as well as electrical engineers. However, as of 2012, computer engineers issued from the chamber. (see Chamber of Computer Engineers of Turkey) According to law, all engineers in these fields are required to join the chamber after they complete their engineering education. The total number of chamber members was around 42 000 as of 2009.

== Organization ==
The center of the chamber is in Ankara. But there are 14 branch offices all over Turkey; namely in Adana, Ankara, Antalya, Bursa, Denizli, Diyarbakır, Eskişehir, Gaziantep, Istanbul, İzmir, İzmit, Mersin, Samsun, and Trabzon. All branch offices have several sub offices in other cities.

== Objectives ==
Among the many objectives of the chamber, some of which are carried out with the collaboration of the universities and municipalities, the following can be emphasized:

- Organization of training courses, fairs, seminars, symposiums for the members. EMO also informs members about updates of standards, norms, regulations and technical specifications
- Consultation with the public authority and Union of Chambers of Turkish Engineers and Architects to prepare and change the laws and regulations concerning the activities of the chamber; preparation of press statements about professional matters.
- Authorization of building projects (installations such as power, illumination, audio-visual etc.) EMO annually supervises earthing and elevators in the industrial plants and buildings.
- Serving as an expert, arbitrator, consultant, etc. at courts concerning the profession.
