= Chamber of Computer Engineers of Turkey =

Engineering organization of Turkey

Chamber of Computer Engineers of Turkey (Turkish: Bilgisayar Mühendisleri Odası, abbreviated BMO) was founded on 2 June 2012.

Formerly, the computer engineers in Turkey were the members of Chamber of Electrical Engineers of Turkey. But, on 9 March 2011 computer engineers decided to form their own chamber. The regulatory board announced that each year about 6,500 new CS engineers (including related undergraduate studies) graduate from the universities. During the general assembly of Union of chambers of Turkish engineers and architects (UCTEA) on the 2 June 2012, the request was approved. The chamber has become the 24th member of the union - UCTEA.
