= Canadian Federation of Engineering Students =

Canadian association of student societies

Canadian Federation of Engineering Students Fédération canadienne étudiante en génie
- Abbreviation: CFES
- Founded: 1967
- Type: Organizations based in Canada
- Location: Ottawa, Ontario, Canada
- Members: 75,000 (est.) students in 51 engineering societies
- Official language: English, French
- Key people: See National Executive
- Website: www.cfes.ca

The Canadian Federation of Engineering Students (CFES) (Fédération canadienne étudiante en génie in French) is the national association of undergraduate engineering student societies in Canada and exists to organize activities, provide services and interact with professional and other bodies at the national and international level for the benefit of Canadian engineering students. The organization is a bilingual non-profit corporation based in Ottawa, Ontario, Canada, managed by a volunteer team of engineering students and recent graduates from across Canada.

== Activities ==
=== CFES Canadian Engineering Leadership Conference ===
The flagship event of the CFES, the Canadian Engineering Leadership Conference (CELC), formerly known as Congress, serves as both the Annual General Meeting of the Federation, as well as a leadership development forum for engineering students from across Canada. CELC is typically held in the first week or January, spanning a full week of leadership development sessions, informational presentations, guest speakers from industry, a career fair and culminating in plenary, the decision making body of the CFES. At congress, the CFES National Executive and other officer positions are elected, and bids are made to host other CFES activities.

==== Host schools ====
- 1969 McGill University (Montreal, Québec)
- 1970 Université Laval (Québec City, Québec)
- 1971 Carleton University & University of Ottawa (Ottawa, Ontario)
- 1972 University of New Brunswick (Fredericton, New Brunswick)
- 1973 University of British Columbia (Vancouver, British Columbia)
- 1974 University of Waterloo (Waterloo, Ontario)
- 1975 University of Calgary (Calgary, Alberta)
- 1976 Memorial University (St. John's, Newfoundland and Labrador)
- 1977 University of Manitoba (Winnipeg, Manitoba)
- 1978 Université de Sherbrooke (Sherbrooke, Québec)
- 1979 Dalhousie University (Halifax, Nova Scotia)
- 1980 University of Alberta (Edmonton, Alberta)
- 1981 Queen's University (Kingston, Ontario)
- 1982 University of Waterloo (Waterloo, Ontario)
- 1983 University of British Columbia (Vancouver, British Columbia)
- 1984 University of Western Ontario (London, Ontario)
- 1985 University of Toronto (Toronto, Ontario)
- 1986 Memorial University (St. John's, Newfoundland and Labrador)
- 1987 University of Manitoba (Winnipeg, Manitoba)
- 1988 Université Laval (Québec City, Québec)
- 1989 Dalhousie University (Halifax, Nova Scotia)
- 1990 Queen's University (Kingston, Ontario)
- 1991 University of Saskatchewan (Saskatoon, Saskatchewan)
- 1992 École Polytechnique de Montréal & McGill University (Montreal, Québec)
- 1993 McMaster University (Hamilton, Ontario)
- 1994 University of Calgary (Calgary, Alberta)
- 1995 University of New Brunswick (Fredericton, New Brunswick)
- 1996 University of Waterloo (Waterloo, Ontario)
- 1997 Université de Sherbrooke (Sherbrooke, Québec)
- 1998 University of Alberta (Edmonton, Alberta)
- 1999 University of Toronto (Toronto, Ontario)
- 2000 University of Manitoba (Winnipeg, Manitoba)
- 2001 McGill University (Montreal, Québec)
- 2002 Dalhousie University (Halifax, Nova Scotia)
- 2003 University of Saskatchewan (Saskatoon, Saskatchewan)
- 2004 University of Victoria (Victoria, British Columbia)
- 2005 University of Toronto (Toronto, Ontario)
- 2006 University of Windsor (Windsor, Ontario)
- 2007 Concordia University (Montreal, Québec)
- 2008 University of Alberta (Edmonton, Alberta)
- 2009 Carleton University (Ottawa, Ontario)
- 2010 McMaster University (Hamilton, Ontario)
- 2011 Memorial University (St. John's, Newfoundland and Labrador)
- 2012 Yukon College (Whitehorse, Yukon)
- 2013 University of Waterloo (Waterloo, Ontario)
- 2014 Université de Sherbrooke (Sherbrooke, Québec)
- 2015 University of Manitoba (Winnipeg, Manitoba)
- 2016 University of Calgary (Calgary, Alberta)
- 2017 University of Western Ontario (London, Ontario)
- 2018 Dalhousie University (Halifax, Nova Scotia)
- 2019 McGill University (Montreal, Québec)
- 2020 University of Alberta (Edmonton, Alberta)
- 2021 Canadian Federation of Engineering Students (Virtual)
- 2022 Memorial University of Newfoundland (Virtual)
- 2023 University of Calgary (Calgary, Alberta)
- 2024 Memorial University of Newfoundland (St. John's, Newfoundland)
- 2025 University of New Brunswick (Fredericton, New Brunswick)
- 2026 University of Western Ontario (London, Ontario)

=== Publications ===
The CFES Project Magazine, also known as ProMag, is a magazine published by the CFES and distributed to member schools. In 2012, ProMag was discontinued due to a shifted interest in providing an online journal that is more easily accessible. Additionally, the content of ProMag did not any longer satisfy the desires of CFES members.

Subsequently, Promag was replaced by the CFES Publication (also called the Pub), which is an online publication that is focused on promoting the research and super-curricular activities of Canadian undergraduate engineering students. The Pub is a service provided by the Federation, and is no longer up for bid at Congress. The Pub has since become defunct.

In the 2019-2020 Operating Year, the CFES decided to revive Project Magazine as an in-house online journal, celebrating the different regions of the federation through articles and stories submitted to a Task Force. It exists as a virtual publication.

=== Canadian Engineering Competition (CEC) ===
The Canadian Engineering Competition (CEC) (Compétition canadienne d'ingénierie in French) is an annual competition involving more than 150 of the best and brightest engineering students from across Canada.

All competitors at the CEC qualify for the competition through one of four regional competitions:

- Western Engineering Competition (WEC)
- Ontario Engineering Competition (OEC) - OEC 2022
- Quebec Engineering Competition (QEC)
- Atlantic Engineering Competition (AEC)

==== Competition categories ====
The CEC includes competitions in a variety of topics. Individual competitors can be entered in any one of the following competition categories:

- Impromptu Debate
- Senior Design
- Junior Design
- Consulting Engineering
- Innovative Design
- Engineering Communication
- Re-Engineering
- Programming

==== Host schools ====
As the CEC has a national scope, engineering schools wishing to host the competition must win a competitive bid process through the Canadian Federation of Engineering Students. Schools that have hosted the competition since its inception in 1985 include:

- 1985 University of Waterloo (Waterloo, Ontario)
- 1986 Ecole Polytechnique de Montreal (Montreal, Quebec)
- 1987 University of Alberta (Edmonton, Alberta)
- 1989 University of Western Ontario (London, Ontario)
- 1990 University of British Columbia (Vancouver, British Columbia)
- 1991 Université de Sherbrooke (Sherbrooke, Quebec)
- 1992 Queen's University (Kingston, Ontario)
- 1993 Dalhousie University (Halifax, Nova Scotia)
- 1994 University of Toronto (Toronto, Ontario)
- 1995 University of Alberta (Edmonton, Alberta)
- 1996 Simon Fraser University (Burnaby, British Columbia)
- 1997 Université de Moncton (Moncton, New Brunswick)
- 1998 Carleton University (Ottawa, Ontario)
- 1999 Ecole Polytechnique de Montreal (Montreal, Quebec)
- 2000 University of Western Ontario (London, Ontario)
- 2001 University of Victoria (Victoria, British Columbia)
- 2002 Université Laval (Quebec City, Quebec)
- 2003 Memorial University of Newfoundland (St. John's, Newfoundland and Labrador)
- 2004 McMaster University (Hamilton, Ontario)
- 2005 University of Calgary (Calgary, Alberta)
- 2006 Ecole Polytechnique de Montreal (Montreal, Quebec)
- 2007 University of Saskatchewan (Saskatoon, Saskatchewan)
- 2008 University of Waterloo (Waterloo, Ontario)
- 2009 University of New Brunswick (Fredericton, New Brunswick)
- 2010 University of Toronto (Toronto, Ontario)
- 2011 McGill University (Montreal, Quebec)
- 2012 University of British Columbia (Vancouver, British Columbia)
- 2013 Carleton University (Ottawa, Ontario)
- 2014 University of Western Ontario (London, Ontario)
- 2015 Memorial University of Newfoundland (St. John's, Newfoundland and Labrador)
- 2016 McGill University (Montreal, Quebec)
- 2017 University of Calgary (Calgary, Alberta)
- 2018 Ryerson University (Toronto, Ontario)
- 2019 University of Waterloo (Waterloo, Ontario)
- 2020 University of Manitoba (Winnipeg, Manitoba)
- 2021 University of New Brunswick (Virtual)
- 2022 University of New Brunswick (Fredericton, New Brunswick)
- 2023 University of Waterloo (Waterloo, Ontario)
- 2024 University of Calgary (Calgary, Alberta)
- 2025 Dalhousie University (Halifax, Nova Scotia)
- 2026 Université de Sherbrooke (Sherbrooke, Québec)

== Services ==
=== CFES Lean Six Sigma ===
The CFES offers a certification course in Lean Six Sigma. Formerly available through a partnership with Canada Post, the service could only be offered in one of Vancouver, Edmonton, Toronto, or Montreal- one of Canada Post's major hubs. In 2019, the CFES obtained a partnership agreement with Abacus which re-instated a more nationally available event for members to participate in. Typically, it occurs over the course of two weekends- one in English, and one in French, respectively.

==== Host schools ====
- 2019 École de technologie supérieure (Montreal, Quebec)
- 2020 York University (Virtual)
- 2021 Cancelled due to External Factors

=== CFES Conference on Diversity in Engineering (CDE) ===
The CFES is offers the Conference on Diversity in Engineering (CDE) to its members.

NCWIE began in 1990 as a local conference at Queen's University and in 2003 it became a national event. Other Canadian universities were invited to host it after the 2007 conference. The University of Western Ontario was the first school after Queen's University to host the event in 2008. Shortly thereafter, NCWIE was made a service of the Canadian Federation of Engineering Students.

The first year that the CFES Conference on Diversity in Engineering is offered is 2015, denoting the end of the National Conference on Women in Engineering.

==== Host schools ====
- 1990 – 2007 Queen's University (Kingston, Ontario)
- 2008 University of Western Ontario (London, Ontario)
- 2009 University of Toronto (Toronto, Ontario)
- 2010 University of Ottawa (Ottawa, Ontario)
- 2011 McMaster University (Hamilton, Ontario)
- 2012 Concordia University (Montreal, Quebec)
- 2013 University of British Columbia (Vancouver, British Columbia)
- 2014 University of Saskatchewan (Saskatoon, Saskatchewan)
- 2015 University of Waterloo (Waterloo, Ontario)
- 2016 McGill University (Montreal, Quebec)
- 2017 McMaster University (Hamilton, Ontario)
- 2018 Ryerson University (Toronto, Ontario)
- 2019 University of Western Ontario (London, Ontario)
- 2020 University of Calgary (Virtual)
- 2021 Dalhousie University (Virtual)
- 2022 University of Manitoba (Winnipeg, Manitoba)
- 2023 University of Waterloo (Waterloo, Ontario)
- 2024 Western University (London, Ontario)
- 2025 McGill University (Montreal, Quebec)

=== CFES Conference on Sustainability in Engineering (CSE) ===
The CFES is offers the Conference on Sustainability in Engineering (CSE) to its members. CSE began as a new conference intended to address the need for a national discussion on sustainability in the Engineering field, as a part of the sustainability working group's work, and in address to the CFES Stance on Sustainability.

The first year that the CFES Conference on Sustainability in Engineering was offered is 2019, at the University of Northern British Columbia in Prince George, BC.

==== Host schools ====
- 2019 University of Northern British Columbia (Prince George, British Columbia)
- 2020 University of Waterloo (Waterloo, Ontario)
- 2021 Université de Sherbrooke (Virtual)
- 2022 University of Guelph (Virtual)
- 2023 University of British Columbia (Vancouver, British Columbia)
- 2024 Toronto Metropolitan University (Toronto, Ontario)
- 2025 University of Guelph (Guelph, Ontario)
- 2026 Université du Québec à Trois-Rivières (Trois-Rivières, Quebec)

== Structure ==
=== Members ===
The membership of the organization consists of engineering student societies, rather than individual engineering students. Eligibility for membership is limited to those societies located at a Canadian university that has at least one engineering program accredited by the Canadian Engineering Accreditation Board and represents engineering student concerns to the school's administration and engineering faculty.

The member societies are divided into four geographic regions for the purposes of representation on the Federation's board of directors:

- Atlantic (New Brunswick, Newfoundland and Labrador, Nova Scotia, and Prince Edward Island)
- Ontario
- Quebec
- West (Alberta, British Columbia, Manitoba, Saskatchewan and the Canadian territories)

=== Board of directors ===
As a non-profit organization, the Federation has a board of directors that is responsible for managing the business and property of the organization. Aside from the Chair, the board consists of 3 individuals elected at the annual meeting (the President, and the two National Councillors) and four regional ambassadors, selected using regionally-determined methods. The Vice-Presidents sit on the board as non-voting members:

- The Chair
- The President
- Four (4) Regional Ambassadors:
- West Ambassador
- Ontario Ambassador
- Quebec Ambassador
- Atlantic Ambassador
- Two (2) National Councillors
- The Vice Presidents (Non-Voting)

=== Officer Team ===
==== National Executive ====
The CFES' operations are split by the National Executive, each operating in a different component. The National Executive will coordinate as one unit and ensure the smooth operations of the federation.

- President
- Vice President Academic
- Vice President Finance
- Vice President Services
- Vice President External
- Vice President Communications

==== Current Team ====
- President: Hayley Jubinville (Université d'Ottawa)
- VP Academic: Alexis Moutafis-Tymcio (McMaster University)
- VP Finance: Vacant
- VP Services: Kaitlyn Smith (University of Prince Edward Island)
- VP External: Matthew Watts (University of Waterloo A)
- VP Communications: Celia Evans (University of Waterloo B)
- Chair: Adam Corbier (McGill University)
- West Ambassador: Eric Suh (Simon Fraser University Burnaby)
- Ontario Ambassador: Chris Cresencia (Carleton University)
- Quebec Ambassador: Lou Cloutier (Université Laval)
- Atlantic Ambassador: Nyah Lupick (Dalhousie University)
- Two (2) National Councillors: Garv Arora (University of Waterloo A) & Emma Sanderson (University of Guelph)

==== Past ====
2025-2026

- President: Emma Sanderson (University of Guelph)
- VP Academic: Jack Walker (Queen's University)
- VP Finance and Administration: Luke Schuurman (McMaster University)
- VP Services: Sophie Petrushkina (Toronto Metropolitan University)
- VP External: Vacant
- VP Communications: Hayley Jubinville (University of Ottawa)
- Chair: Beth Cushnie
- West Ambassador: Sarah Keegan
- Ontario Ambassador: Rayyan Faisal
- Quebec Ambassador: Olivier Turmel
- Atlantic Ambassador: Jayden MacKenzie
- Two (2) National Councillors: Vacant

2024-2025

- President: Kalena McCloskey (Queen's University)
- VP Academic: Vacant
- VP Finance and Administration: Luke Schuurman (McMaster University)
- VP Services: Houda El Hajjaoui (University of New Brunswick)
- VP External: Jamie Grasley (Lakehead University)
- VP Communications: Sheyda Shams (University of Waterloo)

2023-2024

- President: Duncan Lamont (University of Manitoba)
- VP Advocacy: Catherine Bentancourt-Lee (University of Calgary)
- VP Finance and Administration: Emily Schwab (University of Regina)
- VP Services: Bridget Patterson (University of Prince Edward Island)
- VP External: Juliette Gagnon (Université Laval)
- VP Communications: Christine Nguyen (Toronto Metropolitan University)

==== Commissioners ====
The CFES further operates with Commissioners conducting the tasks in a specific portfolio. These commissioners are:

- Corporate Relations Commissioner
- Bilingualism Commissioner
- Media & Marketing Commissioner
- IT Commissioner
- Data Commissioner
- Truth and Reconciliation Commissioner
- Logistics Commissioner
- Leadership Commissioner
- Finance Commissioner
- Governance Commissioner

==== Activity managers ====
The chairs of each of the activities and services offered by the CFES are also considered full officers of the CFES. These include:

- Summit on Development of Engineering Societies Activity Manager (SDES) (formerly known as President's Meeting)
- Conference on Diversity in Engineering Activity Manager (CDE)
- Canadian Engineering Leadership Conference Activity Manager (CELC)
- Conference on Sustainability in Engineering Activity Manager (CSE)
- Canadian Engineering Competition Activity Manager (CEC)

== Corporate partners ==
- Engineers Canada
- Canadian Council of Professional Engineers
- Association of Canadian Engineering Companies
- Engineering Change Lab
- Ontario Society of Professional Engineers

== Student partners ==
- Board of European Students of Technology
- National Association of Engineering Student Councils (American student organization for students of engineering and technology)
- EngiQueers Canada (National diversity and inclusion engineering student organization)
- Canadian Association of Business Students (CABS)

== Regional associations ==
- Western Engineering Student Societies' Team (WESST)
- Engineering Student Societies' Council of Ontario (ESSCO)
- Quebec Confederation for Engineering Student Outreach (QCESO (more recognized by its French acronym, CREIQ))
- Atlantic Council of Engineering Students (ACES)

== See also ==
- List of engineering societies in Canada
