= Otago University Debating Society =

The Otago University Debating Society (OUDS) is a debating society established in June 1878 and is the oldest society of the University of Otago, the first university to be founded in New Zealand. Echoing trends in Australia and the United States (the University of Sydney Union was founded in 1874 and Harvard's debating union in 1880), in the latter decades of the nineteenth century debating was seen as an important talent for New Zealand's thought leaders, and was one of the three sports in the New Zealand University Games from 1902.

Prominent members of OUDS during its early years included Alfred Richard Barclay (one of its first vice-presidents), William Downie Stewart Jr (1898–1900), Harry Bedford (1900–1901) who as a 25-year-old policial novice entered Parliament in 1902 with the highest individual vote that had ever been recorded in New Zealand, John Callan (who won the Joynt Challenge Scroll in 1905) and Ossie Mazengarb (c.1910).

OUDS is one of the five societies in the New Zealand Universities Debating Council, through which members compete in domestic, national and international tournaments. In conjunction with members from the Otago University Rugby Club, OUDS members formed the Otago University Students' Association (OUSA) in 1890 because it felt that university students needed strong representation. OUSA has since become a strong advocate for student rights.

== Governance ==
=== OUDS Executive ===
OUDS has an eight-person executive composed of the President, Vice President, Secretary-Treasurer, Tournaments Officer, Development Officer, Schools Officer, Externals Officer, and Equity Officer. An additional Women's portfolio also exists, which is delegated to a female-identifying member of the executive.

=== Sponsorship ===
OUDS is financially supported by the Vice Chancellor of the University of Otago, the Faculty of Law at the University of Otago, and Anderson Lloyd.

== Tournaments ==
=== Glossary of Debating Terms ===
- CA/DCA- The chief adjudicator/deputy chief adjudicators are judges selected to run the debating side of a tournament, and are responsible for selecting motions, setting a timetable, and running the tournament.
- Convenors- Individuals in charge of running the administrative side of a tournament, such as booking rooms and organising social events.
- Team names- Team names are based on a team's institution, and ranking within that institution. For example, the best Otago team is referred to as O1, the best Victoria team as V1, and so on and so forth.
- Majors- Majors are the main tournaments which OUDS participates in. There are four major tournaments for OUDS: Joynt Scroll, Australs, Officers Cup and Worlds.
- Breaking- When a team or judge is selected to participate in the out-rounds of a tournament (e.g. Semi-finals, Finals).
- Supers- Supers, or Super-adjudicators are judges who have CAed or DCAed a tournament. They are traditionally expected to be of a high quality as judges, are exempt from campus conflicts, and are responsible for accrediting new judges.
- Accreditation- A process where new judges 'trainee', and watch debates alongside a more experienced judge until they are thought to be of a high-enough quality to accredit (or qualify) as a judge. Which trainees accredit is decided by whichever super-adjudicators are attending a tournament. Trainees are able to accredit at any one of four tournaments; Joynt Scroll, Claytons, Officers Cup or Thropy. Only accredited judges are able to judge New Zealand's two major tournaments; Officers Cup and Joynt Scroll.

=== Bluff Cup ===
The Bluff Cup is the weekly internal tournament held between teams of debaters at OUDS. Each team name is based on a South Island locality. The Bluff Cup itself was donated in 1988 by the team that won the OUDS championship in that year, Team Bluff. At the end of Otago's first semester, a final is held. Recent winners include:

- 2016: Nathaniel Brown, Grace Belworthy and Emily Williams
- 2017: Adam Sangster and Jeanne-Marie Bonnet
- 2018: Andre Castaing and William Warren
- 2019: Anna Roberts, Shannon Chalmers, Seth Whittington

A more complete list can be found on the OUDS website.

=== Joynt Scroll ===
Joynt Scroll (Formerly known as New Zealand University Prepared Debating Championships or "Winters") is a three team member debating competition. Joynt Scroll is New Zealand's oldest and most respected national university debating tournament, and is New Zealand's second oldest sporting competition. Until recently, it was a fully prepared tournament held during the second semester break, but in 2019, the tournament was changed to have only thirty minutes of preparation time, and was moved to the first semester break (Easter time). Otago has consistently performed well at Joynt scroll

- In 2011, O1 (Kieran Bunn, William Cheyne and Paul Hunt) made it to the semi-finals of the competition, only to be defeated by the eventual winners, Victoria Two. William Cheyne was named as Captain of the NZ Prepared Debating team (an honorary team made up of the best speakers of the tournament) that year.
- In 2012 O1 (Nicholas Gavey, Kieran Bunn, Paul Hunt) finished as runners up.
- In 2013, O1 (Patrick Dawson, Kieran Bunn and John Brinsley-Pirie) once more reached the semifinals, with speaker Kieran Bunn named as best speaker of the tournament and John Brinsley-Pirie named as 1st reserve to the New Zealand Team.
- In 2014, O1 (Liv Hall, Kieran Bunn, Alec Dawson) won the tournament.
- In 2015, O1 (Alice Sowry, John Brinsley-Pirie and Jamie Tocher) once again made the final.
- In 2016, O1 (Paul Hunt, Joe Ascroft and Jamie Tocher) again made the final and lost to the University of Auckland. Joe Ascroft was chosen as second reserve and Jamie Tocher chosen as first reserve for the championship team.
- In 2017, OUDS judge Courtney Cunningham was a DCA for Joynt Scroll, and OUDS judge Emily Williams broke as a judge.
- In 2018, OUDS judges Joe Ascroft and Emily Williams were DCAs, and OUDS alumna Alice Sowry was the CA.
- In 2019, Otago hosted Joynt Scroll. The tournament was convened by Joe Garry and Selena Ballantyne, and the CA was OUDS alumni Joe Ascroft. O1 (Connor Seddon, Nick Robertson and Grace Belworthy) won the tournament, and OUDS judge Simon Williams broke as a judge.
- In 2022, O1 (Joe Garry, Jaiden Tucker, Georgia Barclay) won the tournament.

=== Claytons ===
Claytons is an amateur tournament for debaters who have not spoken at more than two major tournaments. It is held annually between OUDS and the University of Canterbury Debating Society and has sometimes included teams from Waikato University (as in 2011). Traditionally Otago and Canterbury alternate as hosts of the event with adjudicators from other University debating societies, such as Victoria, travelling to adjudicate debates at Claytons for the purpose of accrediting trainee adjudicators.

Teams of three speakers are given 30 minutes preparation time before each debate. A round of debates is held in a pool format and teams with the best records in terms of wins and speaker points from those debates advance to the semi-finals and finals of the tournament. The 2006 competition, hosted by OUDS was in Waimate, South Canterbury and was won by a team from Canterbury. The 2007 tournament, held in Christchurch, was won by Otago. In more recent history Otago won the 2011 and 2012 tournaments also held in Waimate. Both of these were Otago-Otago finals. In 2013 Canterbury won the Claytons final in a 5–4 split decision which gave rise to the Goodall paradox.

From 2014 onwards, Claytons has been held at the Raincliff Anglican Youth Camp. From 2014 to 2017, Otago-Otago finals occurred. In 2018 and 2019, Otago-Canterbury finals occurred, and the tournament was won by Canterbury both years.

As a tournament Claytons is noted for its unique social nature compared to other debating tournaments held in New Zealand. Participating debaters socialise in the same common area and sleep in the same living quarters over the entire tournament. At other tournaments, teams from different societies are often housed in different hotel rooms and do not have a focal social commons. Claytons is also unique in that it takes place at a scout camp. Debates are held in sleeping rooms, the main room and outside.

An equivalent tournament, Thropy, is held in the North Island between Victoria, Auckland and Waikato Debating Societies.

=== Australasian Intervarsity Debating Championships ===
The Australasian Intervarsity Debating Championships more commonly known as "Australs" is a week-long competition held in the break between university semesters. Debates are held over a range of international topics. Australs follows a traditional debating format: three team members with eight preliminary rounds. Topics are impromptu with half an hour of preparation time allowed.

The 2010 Australs was hosted by the University of Auckland Debating Society. OUDS sent seven teams and six adjudicators. William Chisholm was a grand final adjudicator. In 2011 Australs was held in South Korea. Otago sent two teams and three adjudicators. The Otago One team (Purdon, Bunn, Hunt) broke in 15th place to the double-octo finals. In 2012 Otago sent five teams and four adjudicators to Australs hosted by Victoria University of Wellington.

In 2013 the Otago University Debating Society was successful in a bid to host the 2014 Australs.

In 2017, OUDS broke to the Octo-finals of Australs with a team of Joe Ascroft, Emily Williams and Grace Belworthy.

=== Officers Cup ===
Easters, (previously known as the "University Games") is the first national debating tournament of the year, competing for the Officer's Cup. OUDS has been a regular competitor at the tournament (usually sending the maximum of five teams) ever since the first event in 1902. The tournament is held in the first mid-semester break. Teams of two speakers are given five minutes' preparation time. University Games (Easters) 2010 was held in Invercargill.

In 2018, Otago defeated Victoria University in the final with a team of Joe Ascroft and Emily Williams, this was the first time Otago had won the tournament in 20 years.

Otago is due to host Easters in 2019.

=== World Universities Debating Championship ===
OUDS has sent teams to the World Universities Debating Championship. In 2013 Otago sent three teams to the World Championship being hosted in Berlin, all of whom 'broke' or qualified, for the 48 team knock out rounds. The Otago A team of Alec Dawson and Kieran Bunn made it into the top four teams and competed in the grand final (ultimately won by the Monash B team). In the 2014 Worlds in Chennai, Otago sent two teams, once again breaking both teams into the knock out rounds. Unfortunately both teams were knocked out in the octo-finals. Otago University has traditionally been very supportive of the OUDS WUDC campaigns.

=== Australasian Women's Debating Championships ===
OUDS has regularly sent teams to Australasian Women's. Some of the best women debaters from around the world compete in the tournament, which is aimed at development for junior speakers. In 2016, Otago made it to the grand final with a team of Emily Williams and Alice Sowery. Similarly, in 2017 Otago broke to the semi-finals of the tournament with a team of Emily Williams and Selena Ballantyne.

In 2017, Otago won a bid to host AWDC in 2018.

Otago AWDC 2018 occurred in early September 2018. Teams from around Australasia attended the tournament. Two Otago teams broke into the quarter-finals. Otago 1 made it to the Grand Finals. Grace Belworthy was awarded fifth best speaker of the tournament.

=== New Zealand Women's Debating Championships ===
In 2018, Otago sent a team to the first NZ Women's Debating Championships.

== OUDS alumni ==
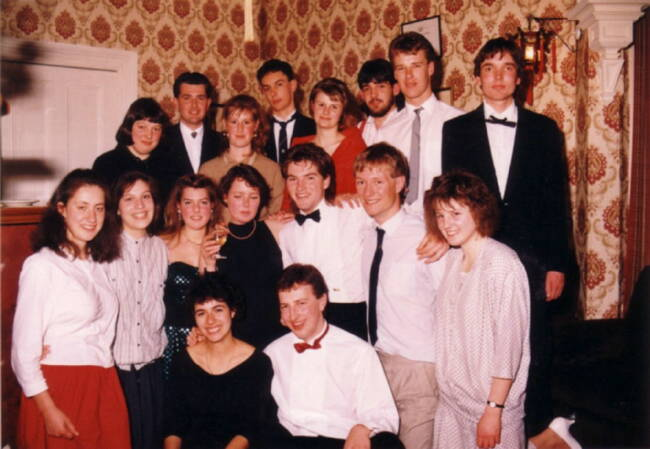
1988 OUDS members

There are a number of notable alumni members.

- Michael Laws writer, broadcaster and politician
- Malcolm Wright Professor of Marketing, Massey University NZ
- Chris Carter, politician and gay equality campaigner
- David Pine singer and diplomat
- Deborah Russell, Labour Party MP
- David Cunliffe, former leader of the Labour Party
- Grant Robertson, current Vice-Chancellor of the University of Otago, former Labour Party MP and Minister of Finance
- Holly Walker, politician and author
- Thomas Jeffery Parker zoologist

=== Rhodes Scholars ===
OUDS alumni include a number of Otago University's Rhodes Scholars who have also held executive positions in the society. Recent OUDS recipients of the award include:

- Damen Ward, Rhodes Scholar 1999.
- Sally McKechnie, Rhodes Scholar 2000
- Chris Curran, Rhodes Scholar 2001
- Rachel Carrell, Rhodes Scholar 2002
- Holly Walker, Rhodes Scholar 2007
- Louis Chambers, Rhodes Scholar 2012, president of OUDS 2010/2011

== Media profile and public debates ==
OUDS has a long coverage relationship with the Otago Daily Times going back at least as far as 1894. The ODT has recently covered public debates held by OUDS featuring high-profile speakers on controversial contemporary issues. These include debates about mining and deep-sea oil drilling in New Zealand and alcohol age legislation.

OUDS has been featured regularly in the Otago University student magazine, Critic, since the magazines inception in 1925. From 2010 to 2011 Critic had a regular feature column called "Debatable" where two writers would argue the affirming or negative case on a moot.
