= Craccum =

Student magazine in Auckland, New Zealand

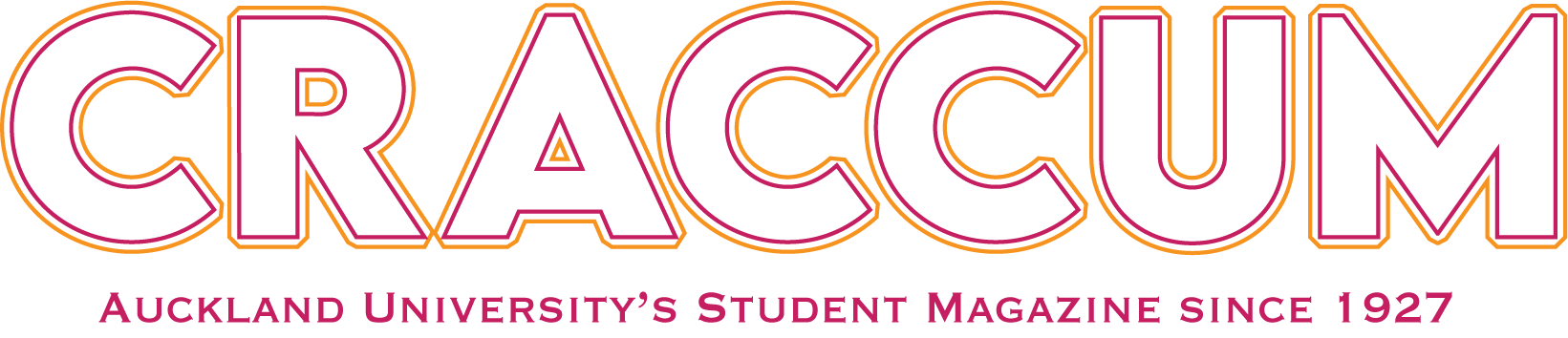
- Categories: News, Arts, Lifestyle, Te Ao Māori, Pasifika, Culture, Visual Arts
- Frequency: Tri-weekly
- Format: A4
- Circulation: 1,000
- Founded: 1927 (99 years ago)
- Company: Auckland University Students' Association
- Country: New Zealand
- Based in: Auckland
- Language: Primarily English
- Website: www.craccum.co.nz
- OCLC: 173334134

Craccum is a student magazine of the University of Auckland, owned and operated by the Auckland University Students' Association (AUSA) in New Zealand. It was founded in 1927 and the name originated from the scrambled acronym of "Auckland University College Men's Common Room Committee". Craccum is a member of the Aotearoa Student Press Association (ASPA).

== Overview ==
The magazine has at times been controversial, with stories on how to shoplift, the drawbacks of various methods of committing suicide, drug use guides, recipes for illegal drugs and drug rape guides. Craccum is also a popular proving ground for New Zealand mainstream media, with many of its alumni moving on to publications such as The Listener, The New Zealand Herald, The National Business Review and Metro magazine.

In 1989 the publication was re-branded "Torso" (a reference to it being the magazine of the student body) for the final issues of that year, an event noted in the mainstream media. However, the original name was re-established the following year.

In 2005, the rights to the front cover of the sellout-themed issue of Craccum were auctioned on TradeMe. Salient, the student magazine for Victoria University of Wellington, won the auction. In 2011 the rights to the front cover of the women's rights-themed issue were again auctioned on TradeMe, with proceeds going to Women's Refuge; the auction was won by the Tertiary Education Union (TEU).

=== Awards and recognition ===
In 2007, Craccum won the award for Best Publication at the ASPA Awards for the first time. It was awarded runner-up for Best Small Publication in 2016 and runner-up for Best Publication in 2017. In 2022, Craccum won the award for Best Publication at the ASPA Awards for the second time.

== Editors ==
The Craccum Editor was an elected position between 1986 and 2019. The elections were held in the second semester, on the same ballot as the AUSA portfolio elections. Before 1986, the Editor was appointed each year by the Craccum Administration Board. Since 2019 the Craccum Administration Board has also been responsible for appointing Editors, following the introduction of a new AUSA constitution.

Former Craccum Editor Tim Shadbolt (1972) became Mayor of Waitemata City and later Mayor of Invercargill. Mike Rann (1975) was Premier of South Australia 2002 to 2012.

=== Past Editors ===
Past editors of Craccum
- 2026 – Kalana Piramanage and Irene Parsaei
- 2025 – Harry Sutton, Lewis Matheson Creed and Lee Li.* 2024 – Kieran Panui
- 2023 – Mairātea Mohi and George Brooker
- 2022 – Flora Xie and Naomii Seah
- 2021 – Eda Tang and Brian Gu
- 2020 – Cameron Leakey and Daniel Meech
- 2019 – Bailley Verry
- 2018 – Jasmin Singh and Helen Yeung (Feb to July), Caitlin Abley, Mark Fullerton and Samantha Gianotti (July to August), Andrew Winstanley (August to October)
- 2017 – Samantha Gianotti and Catriona Britton
- 2016 – Mark Fullerton and Caitlin Abley
- 2015 – Matthew Denton and Jordan Margetts
- 2014 – Ana Lenard and Kit Haines
- 2013 – Aditya Vasudevan and Calum Redpath
- 2012 – Thomas Dykes
- 2011 – Spencer Dowson and Rhys Mathewson
- 2010 – Dan Sloan
- 2009 – Matthew Harnett and Valentine Watkins
- 2008 – Dan Sloan
- 2007 – Simon Coverdale and Matthew Backhouse
- 2006 – Ryan Sproull
- 2005 – Alec Hutchinson and Stian Overdahl
- 2004 – Allan Swann and Hannah Jennings-Voykovich
- 2003 – Christopher Garland
- 2002 – Colin Mitchell and Susan Edmunds
- 2001 – John Marshall
- 2000 – Ben Thomas and James Cardno
- 1999 – Gareth Elliot and Thomas Shadbolt
- 1998 – Alistair Bone
- 1997 – Martyn Bradbury
- 1996 – Tim Mullins and Anton Pichler
- 1995 – Martyn 'Bomber' Bradbury and Stewart Gardiner
- 1994 – Penny Murray
- 1993 – Peter Malcouronne and Vangelis Vitalis
- 1992 – Jo Mackay
- 1991 – Jo Mackay
- 1990 – Steve Amanono and Sarah Murray (Jan–May);
  Peter Gray, Mark Roach, Simon Holroyd (Interim);
  Mark Roach, Wendy Newton, Peter Gray (Jun–Dec)
- 1989 – Aidan-B. Howard (Jan–May);
  Michael Lamb (May–Dec)
- 1988 – Miriam de Graaf, Carl Fagan, Simon Holroyd and Wendy Lawson (Jan–Mar);
  Miriam de Graaf, Carl Fagan, Simon Holroyd (Mar–Jun);
  Miriam de Graaf, Simon Holroyd (Jun–Dec)
- 1987 – Rachael Callender, Derek Craig, Kerry Hoole, Ewen Smith, Patrick Stodart, Victoria Turner and David Ward
- 1986 – Peter Boys
- 1985 – Pam Goode and Brigitta Noble
- 1984 – Neil Morrison and Rangi Chadwick
- 1983 – Louise Rafkin
- 1982 – David Faulls
- 1981 – David Kirkpatrick
- 1980 – Katherine White
- 1979 – David Merritt
- 1978 – Louise Chunn
- 1977 – Francis Stark
- 1976 – Allan Bell
- 1975 – Mike Rann
- 1974 – Brent Lewis
- 1973 – Stephen Ballantyne, Bob Kerr, and Bob Hillier (from January to July)
- 1972 – Heather McInnes, Tim Shadbolt and Gordon Clifton
- 1971 – Stephen Chan, Robert Wellington
- 1970 – Ted Sheehan
- 1969 – Mac Price
- 1968 – George de Bres
- 1967 – Geoff Chapple (Mar–Jun);
  George De Bres and Michael Volkering (Jun–Dec)
- 1966 – Lei Lealulu and Dave Fleming (Jan–Jun);
  Mike Morrissey (Jun–Dec)
- 1965 – C. A. Moir
- 1964 – John Sanders
- 1963 – Dick Johnstone
- 1962 – Francis J. Lillie
- 1961 – Adrienne Rhodes
- 1960 – Felicity Maidment
- 1959 – Jonathan Hunt
- 1958 – S. E. Cox and D. R. Taylor
- 1957 – R. W. Armstrong
- 1956 – D. J. Stone and R. W. Armstrong
- 1955 – Jim Traue and David Stone
- 1953 – Brian Smart and Peter Boag
- 1952 – Gerald Utting (Jan–Aug);
  John Anderson and Geoff Fuller (Aug–Dec)
- 1951 – NO RECORD
- 1950 – Peter Timm, David Grace and Roderick Smith (Jan–Mar);
  Gerald Utting and M. Lovegrove (Mar–Dec)
- 1949 – Peter Cape
- 1948 – John Ellis (Jan–Sept);
  Peter Cape (Sept–Dec)
- 1947 – Nora Bayly
- 1946 – J. A. Nathan
- 1945 – R. I. F. Pattison
- 1944 – Travis Wilson
- 1943 – Betty Belshaw (née Sweetman)
- 1942 – NO RECORD
- 1941 – G. I. Cawkwell
- 1940 – P. W. Day
- 1939 – P. W. Day (Jan–Mar);
  Avenal Holcombe (Mar–Dec)
- 1938 – A. O. Woodhouse
- 1937 – Eric H. Halstear
- 1933–1936 – NO RECORD
- 1932 – J. A. E. Mulgan
- 1931 – Eric Harold Blow
- 1930 – P. L. Soljak (Jan–Jun);
  J. A. E. Mulgan (Jun–Aug)
- 1928–1929 – NO RECORD
- 1927 A. K. Matthews, Nigel Wilson and Winifred McNickle
