= Otago University Students' Association =

New Zealand student association

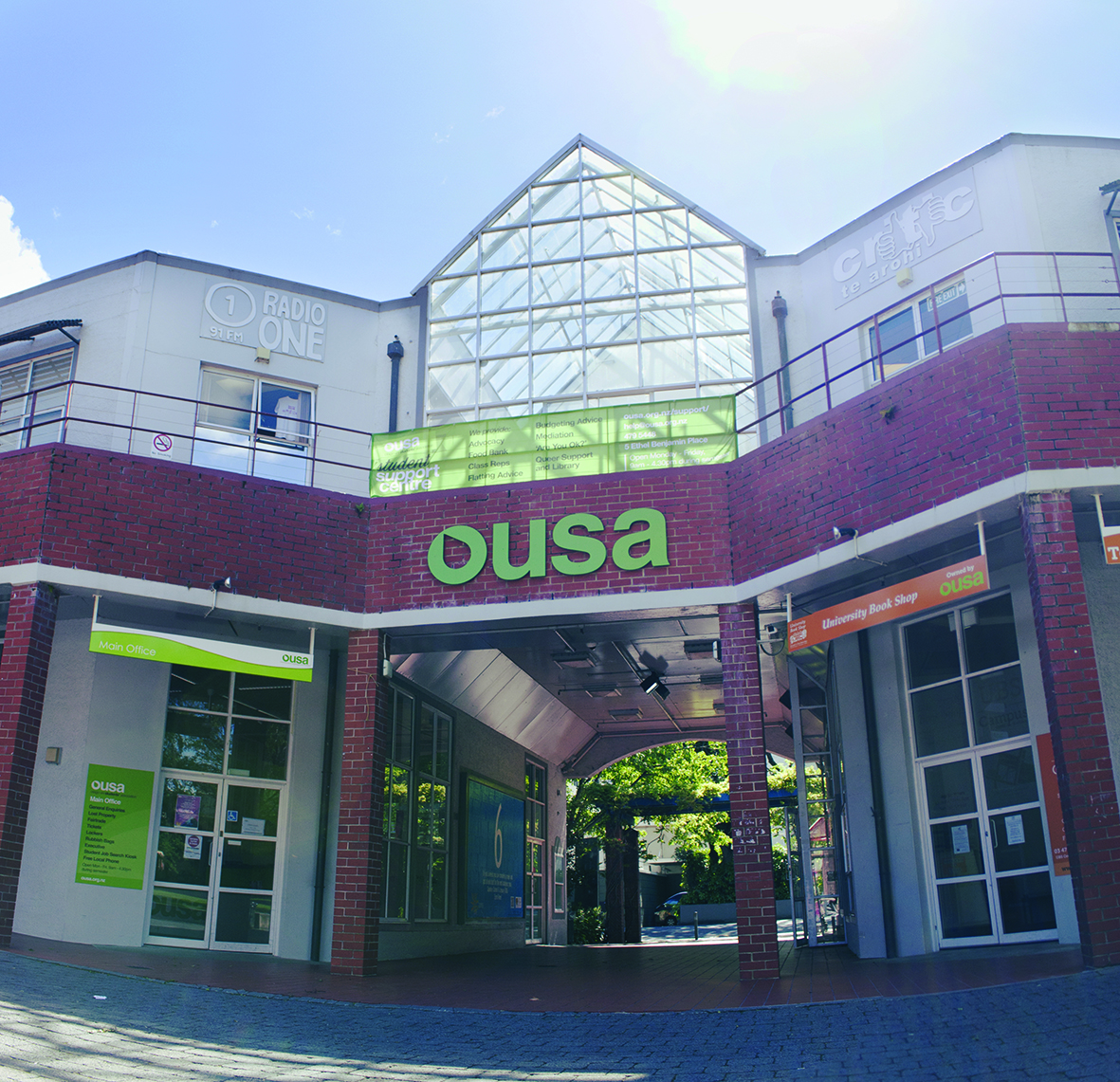
- Motto: Audeamus (Latin)
- Institution: University of Otago
- Location: Dunedin, New Zealand
- Established: 1890
- President: Daniel Leamy
- Vice president: Kamesha Jones
- Members: c. 20,000
- Affiliations: New Zealand Union of Students' Associations
- Brands: Critic (magazine); Radio One
- Website: Official Website

The Otago University Students' Association (OUSA) is the students' association of the University of Otago, New Zealand. OUSA was founded in 1890 to advance student interests on campus.

Today, OUSA provides a combination of representation, welfare, advocacy, recreation and events for its members. It runs student support services, supports clubs and societies on campus, and organises the University of Otago Orientation and Reorientation weeks.

OUSA has a number of subsidiary brands and companies, including Critic Te Ārohi, the student magazine, Radio One, the student radio station, University Bookshop Limited, and Planet Media.

== History ==
As well as providing facilities and student representation on university committees, the students' association began to provide services and facilities for its members. The first Student Union building, providing meeting rooms, men's and women's common rooms and a cafeteria, was established in 1904 in Allen Hall, which is today the university's theatre department. In the 1960s a bigger Student Union was built, and in the 1980s an adjoining building was added to house the OUSA offices, Radio One, Critic and Student Job Search. The Clubs and Societies building provides space for over 100 student clubs and a variety of activities, with fitness and recreation opportunities provided at Unipol, jointly owned with the Otago Polytechnic Students' Association. OUSA also owns the University Book Shop and Student Job Search.

Over the years the students' association has had its share of controversy, frequently around risqué activities during Capping (graduation) week. In 1990, student parties spilled over into the "Dunedin Riot", which damaged public opinion of students at a time when student politicians were actively lobbying and protesting against the introduction of tertiary tuition fees. The arguments against tuition fees included researched predictions of massive graduate debt and increased "brain drain" – graduates leaving the country for lucrative overseas positions. OUSA and students' associations around the country protested vigorously – up to 5,000 people marched in Dunedin alone – but were unable to stop the fees which were introduced in 1991.

In July 2010, the OUSA executive was controversially restructured. Initiated by President Harriet Geoghegan, the new executive would have ten members: President, Administrative Vice President, Finances and Services Officer, Education Officer, Welfare Officer, and five general representatives each holding a portfolio: Postgraduate Students, International Students, Campaigns, Recreation, and Colleges and Communications. A referendum on the issue resulted in a 72.19% vote for the new structure, caused a large number of complaints, none of which were upheld, and divided the existing OUSA executive.

The introduction of tuition fees has led to an increased focus on quality of education, with improvements to the student representative system and more student input on teaching and assessment. At the same time, the growing student population has meant that OUSA services from recreation facilities to student media have become businesses in their own right.

== Structure ==
=== Membership ===
Under the Education Act 1989, membership in OUSA was compulsory for students enrolled at the University of Otago. However, since 2011 the Government made all students' association in New Zealand voluntary membership. The OUSA now maintains a service level agreement with the university, which sees a proportion of the compulsory student services levy used to pay for OUSA services for students, this allows for the ongoing financial viability of the association.

=== Executive ===
The association is headed by a twelve-member executive led by the OUSA president. The executive consists of the president, administrative vice-president, finance and strategy officer, welfare and equity representative, academic representative, political representative, clubs & societies representative, residential representative, international students' representative, postgraduate students' representative, te rōpū Māori tumuaki and the president of the University of Otago Pacific Islands Students' Association. Executive meetings are held weekly or fortnightly, and are open to all members. Student general meetings are held periodically throughout the year to consult with and engage the wider student body in a more formal context.

=== Elections ===
Elections are held annually to select the incoming executive for the following year. Election weeks typically involve candidate forums for questions and debating between individuals running for office.

In September 2008, president-elect Jo Moore was disqualified from becoming the 2009 president after a complaint she came within 20 metres of a polling facility during voting.

== Student Services ==
=== Annual Events ===
The OUSA is responsible for organising the annual Orientation week events held at the beginning of the university year. A number of well-known artists have performed at these events including Macklemore, Tinie Tempah, Empire of the Sun, Flume and Shapeshifter. At the beginning of the second semester, in July, OUSA organises the equivalent Reorientation events.

The Hyde Street party, also known as the Hyde Street Keg Party, is an annual event held in Dunedin in the first semester for students from the University of Otago and Otago Polytechnic, where many participants wear fancy dress. The event originated in 1995, starting as a post-exam celebration organised by residents. The first event saw roughly 3,000 people and attracted bonfires, riot police and 13 students were arrested. It has since become a become a regular part of the Otago University social calendar. Since 2013 OUSA has organised the ticket sales and the health and safety surrounding the event.

Other regular events organised by the OUSA include market days, art week, diversity week, the Capping Show, the Dunedin Craft Beer & Food Festival and an annual Battle of the Bands competition.

=== Clubs and Societies ===
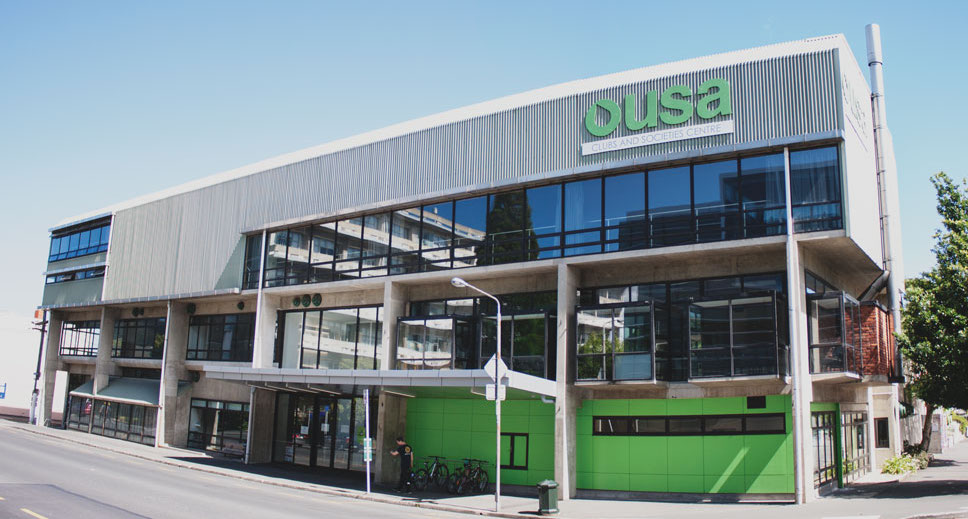
The OUSA Clubs and Societies Centre at 84 Albany Street is a hub for students, clubs and societies.

As the largest student association at the University of Otago, the majority of on-campus clubs and societies affiliate to the association. Notably the Otago University Debating Society, now an affiliated club, pre-dates the formation of the association, and it was members of the debating society that initiated the formation of OUSA in 1890. There are a number of long-standing clubs and societies on campus including the Otago University Rowing Club, the Otago University Rugby Football Club and the Otago University Medical Students Association. Today there are more than 150 clubs and societies affiliated to OUSA, representing a range of ethnicities, religions, politics, sports and interests of Otago students.

The OUSA Clubs and Societies Centre houses the staff that manage the various clubs and societies and the recreation programmes organised by OUSA. Facilities within the centre for students include a sauna, study rooms, music rooms, dance rooms, storage for clubs and an exercise hall. A number of recreation classes are organised and run from the centre, including arts, crafts and cooking, music, sport and dance. Lunches are available at the centre daily during University semesters.

=== Student Support ===
OUSA owns and maintains a department that provides support and advocacy for students. This includes class representation, queer support, a hardship fund and advocacy for a number of grievances.

== Student Media ==
=== Critic ===
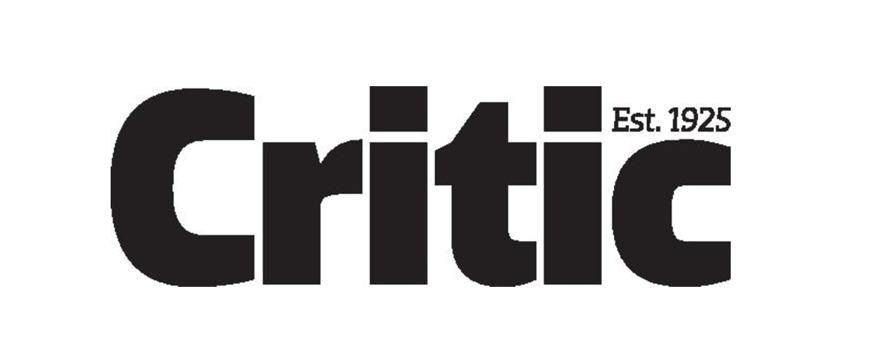
Critic is a University of Otago-based student magazine funded and supported by OUSA through its subsidiary Planet Media Ltd.

Critic is the official magazine of the Otago University Students' Association. It is freely available around both the university's campus and selected sites in Dunedin city weekly during term time. Critic is New Zealand's longest-running student newspaper, having been published since 1925. Weekly circulation is 5,000 copies, with an estimated readership of 21,000.

Critic is a member of the Aotearoa Student Press Association (ASPA), and was awarded Best Publication in the annual ASPA awards in 2005, 2006, 2008, 2010, 2012 and 2013.

Critic has caused controversy on a number of occasions in the past. In 2006 the Office of Film and Literature Classification banned an issue of the magazine, due to it containing a "how-to-guide" on drug rape. Possession or distribution of this issue was deemed illegal. In 2010 The Press Council upheld a complaint against Critic over the article 'The Bum at the Bottom of the World', which depicted three people the publication deemed homeless and vagrant. In 2013 Critic's Editor Callum Fredric received a $35,000 payout after a series of personal disputes with OUSA General Manager Darel Hall. Fredric was suspended by Hall on Friday 3 May, and was trespassed from OUSA buildings by Hall after attending a meeting on Monday 6 May to explain the situation to staff, before being asked to leave by Police. After filing legal proceedings, Fredric accepted a $35,000 settlement package from OUSA on Friday 17 May, and resigned as Editor.

=== Radio One ===
Radio One, or The One, is a student radio station operating from the University of Otago in Dunedin, New Zealand. It broadcasts on a frequency of 91.0 MHz. The station is run largely by volunteer announcers, with a small paid staff. It runs a wide variety of general interest and specialist shows to audiences not catered for by other Dunedin radio stations, such as New Zealand music show The Local and cannabis law reform radio show Overgrown. It is run by Planet Media on behalf of Otago University Students' Association.

In the station's early years, Radio One was broadcast from a 100-watt ERP transmitter atop the 11-storey Hocken Building (now Richardson Building) – then the tallest building on the university campus. In the late 1980s, the station moved their transmitter to Dunedin's main FM radio transmitter atop Mount Cargill, north of the campus. This gives the station a range which covers much of coastal Otago, from Oamaru to past Balclutha. Radio One can now be heard anywhere in the world as it streams all content in 128 kbit/s stereo mp3 over the Internet.

The impetus for the station began with an open letter to the president of the association (then Phyllis Comerford) from Alastair Thomson, who had worked on the Waikato University student radio station. This letter brought together other interested parties including members of the bands Netherworld Dancing Toys and The Verlaines. With a grant from the OUSA of approximately $12,000, the station first went to air in early 1984 broadcasting from the OUSA's former boardroom.

The station ran on a part-time basis during the university year until the mid-1990s, from which time it has been operating round-the-clock throughout the year in a new annex to the Student Union building which was specifically designed to house the station, the OUSA's offices, and the university's student newspaper Critic. The station celebrated its 25th birthday at the beginning of 2009.

Radio One alumni include Shayne Carter, Wallace Chapman, Charlotte Glennie, Sam Hayes, Jan Hellriegel, Lesley Paris, David Pine, Brent Hodge, Sean Norling, Chris Armstrong and Ria Vandervis. Aaron Hawkins served as Radio One's breakfast host from 2006 to 2013 and music director from 2011 to 2013 before standing for the Dunedin mayoralty and being elected a Dunedin City central ward councillor.

== Notable alumni ==
=== Past Presidents ===
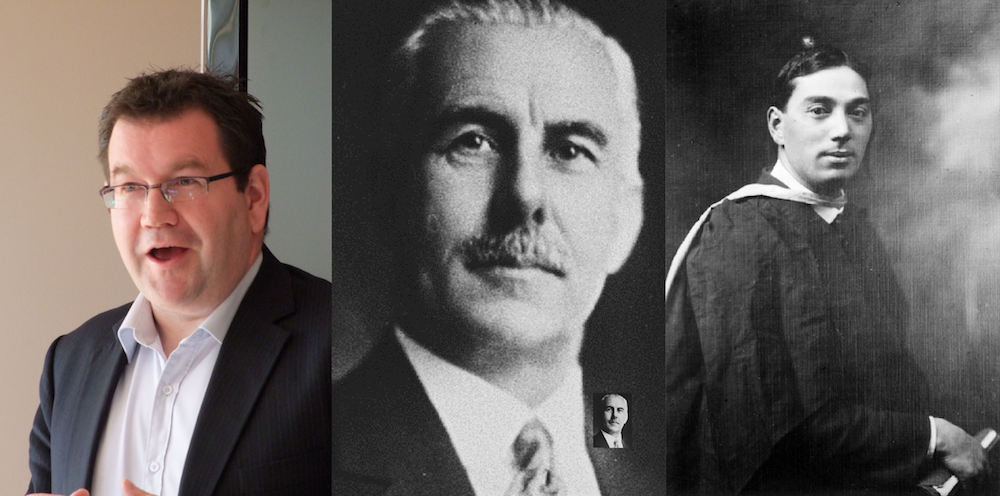
Three well-known past presidents of OUSA. Grant Robertson, Wellington Central MP for the New Zealand Labour Party, Sir John Arthur Stallworthy, Nuffield Professor of Obstetrics and Gynaecology at the University of Oxford, and Te Rangi Hīroa, renowned doctor, military leader and Māori politician.

- Francisco Hernandez, President 2013 (Green Party Member of Parliament)
- Ayesha Verrall, President 2001 (Labour Party Member of Parliament)
- Rachel Brooking, President 1997 (Labour Party Member of Parliament)
- Grant Robertson, President 1993 (Labour Party Member of Parliament, Deputy Prime Minister 2020–23, University of Otago Vice-Chancellor)
- Kirsty Graham, President 1992 (Deputy Permanent Representative Ministry of Foreign Affairs and Trade, New York)
- Helen Varley Jamieson, President 1991 (Playwright and digital artist)
- Sir Jon Doig, President 1988 (Chief Executive of the Commonwealth Games Council for Scotland)
- David Payton, President 1976 (Administrator of Tokelau 2006-09 and Ambassador to the Netherlands 2002-06 and Saudi Arabia 1997–2000)
- Sir James Bruce Robertson, President 1968 (President of the Law Commission and High Court Judge)
- Patrick Thomas Finnigan, President 1967 (Filed the injunction in Finnigan v New Zealand Rugby Football Union to stop the 1985 All Black tour to South Africa)
- Sir Murray Brennan, President 1964 (Chairman of the Surgery Department of the Memorial Sloan Kettering Cancer Center and author)
- Sir Frank Holmes, President 1947 (Economist and government advisor)
- Jack Dodd, President 1946 (Hector's Medal Winner and well-known physicist)
- Dr Douglas Peter (Doug) Kennedy, President 1937 (Director General of Health)
- Wilfred (Mick) Borrie, President 1936 (Demographer and Australian government advisor)
- Sir John Arthur Stallworthy, President 1930 (Nuffield Professor of Obstetrics and Gynaecology, University of Oxford)
- Phillippe Sidney de Quetteville Cabot, President 1924-26 (Founding President of the National Union of Students (precursor to NZUSA) and an All Black)
- Professor Alexander Aitken, President 1920 (Renowned mathematician who developed a number of novel methodologies such as Aitken Extrapolation)
- Te Rangi Hīroa (Sir Peter Buck), President 1901 (Renowned doctor, politician and military leader)

=== Past executive members ===
- Barry Allan, Treasurer 1986 (Contract Law and Torts Law Lecturer at the University of Otago)
- Lady Nola Holmes, Women's Vice-president 1946-47 (The first Women's vice president to receive honorary life membership)

=== Life Members ===
- Aaron Hawkins, Appointed 2024 (Mayor of Dunedin)
- Sukhi Turner, Appointed 2004 (Mayor of Dunedin)
- Ronald Chambers, Appointed 1999 (University of Otago Proctor 1980–2001)
- Rod Carr, Appointed 1980 (University of Canterbury Vice-Chancellor 2009–2019)
- Sir Arthur Beacham, Appointed 1966 (University of Otago Vice-Chancellor 1963–66)
- George VI, made a life member when visiting the University of Otago as Duke of York in 1927.
