= Martyn Bradbury =

New Zealand writer (born 1974)

Martyn "Bomber" Bradbury (born 1974) is a New Zealand media commentator, former radio and TV host, and former executive producer of Alt TV. He was given the nickname Bomber by a former Craccum editor, reputedly to describe his bombastic personality. He has been described by the New Zealand Listener as the "most opinionated man in New Zealand". He has defended his decision to block a number of women on social media and referred to reasons for disputes with five women who previously contributed to The Daily Blog.

== Print media ==
Bradbury was the elected editor of the Auckland University Students' Association's (AUSA) Craccum magazine for the 1997 year, and elected co-editor with Stuart Gardiner for the 1995 year. Before that he was the poetry editor. According to Bradbury, he picked up the nickname Bomber from one of the editors of Craccum.

Bradbury is a former editor (2004–2005) of New Zealand music magazine Rip It Up. Bradbury wrote columns for the tabloid newspaper NZ Truth but quit following the appointment of controversial right-wing blogger Cameron Slater as editor in October 2012. The newspaper subsequently ceased publication in July 2013.

== Radio ==
Prior to his television work, Bradbury was the host of the Late night talk lounge on defunct alternative music station Channel Z from 1996 until 1998, as well as a regular DJ during various time slots. Until late 2011, he was a guest on various panel discussions on Afternoons with Jim Mora on Radio New Zealand (RNZ).

=== Radio New Zealand saga ===
After a regular guest spot on RNZ's show The Panel, the network withdrew an invitation for Bradbury to return as a panellist. While Bradbury claimed he had been "banned" for criticising the New Zealand prime minister, John Key, RNZ said he had not been banned, and that he had been removed as a panellist after breaching their editorial policy. According to Radio NZ, "Bradbury’s comments were inconsistent with information that he had provided to programme producers before going on air. Bradbury later apologised to the programme's executive producer. It was made clear to him that while his invitation to appear as an occasional guest on The Panel was being withdrawn, it was not a 'lifelong ban' and it did not apply to other Radio New Zealand programmes."

== Television ==
He hosted an investigative television series called Stake-Out that used hidden cameras to catch people in the act of committing criminal or immoral acts on film. He hosted Citizen A on Face TV.

Bradbury was also a producer and host on the defunct TV channel Alt TV.

== Online ==
In 2013, Bradbury founded a left-wing blog called The Daily Blog. He later hosted a podcast on the iwi radio station Radio Waatea.

In late September 2024, Bradbury and former National Party staffer and lobbyist Matthew Hooton received legal letters from former National Party leader Don Brash's legal counsel Stephen Franks after Hooton made remarks attacking Brash's character and accusing him of promoting anti-Māori sentiment during his parliamentary career and as leader of Hobson's Pledge during a Working Group podcast that was co-hosted by Bradbury. Following the complaint, Bradbury released a statement stating that Hooton sincerely apologised for his remarks about Brash.

In late April 2025, Bradbury confirmed that he had suspended The Working Group current affairs podcast following a dispute with its co-owner Damien Grant over Bradbury's criticism of Israel's conduct during the Gaza war and the New Zealand Initiative's relationship with the Atlas Network.

On 19 April 2025, The Working Group was replaced with a new online weekly current affairs podcast series called The Bradbury Group. It is sponsored by Waatea News and is available on Rova, YouTube, Sky TV and Facebook. Notable guests have included Labour leader Chris Hipkins, Te Pāti Māori president John Tamihere, The New Zealand Herald columnist Matthew Hooton and New Zealand Council of Trade Unions economist Craig Renney.

=== Legal dispute with Ani O'Brien ===
In early August 2026, Bradbury was facing court action at the Auckland District Court for publishing four contentious blog posts. He said that he was facing a $5,000 fine or six months' imprisonment if he did not take down these posts. Bradbury refused to take down the posts on freedom of speech grounds and said he was prepared to go to prison. On 4 August, he appeared in court before Justice David Sharp, representing himself. The unidentified complainant, who appeared via video conference, alleged that Bradbury had breached the Harmful Digital Communications Act 2015 through his blog posts. They demanded the removal of the posts and an apology from Bradbury. Sharp adjourned the civil hearing, ordering Bradbury to seek legal advice and warning him that further posts could put him in contempt of court.

On 13 August, New Zealand Free Speech Union board member and political commentator Ani O'Brien waived her right to name suppression and identified herself as the complainant who had pursued legal action against Bradbury for alleged "abusive" online posts. In an interim court order, Judge Kate Devonport had ruled that Netsafe had found that Bradbury's posts breached the Harmful Digital Communications Act's principles against indecency and harassment. While Bradbury has argued that he was the victim of a "censorship attempt", he removed the offending lists to comply with the interim court order. O'Brien confirmed that the Free Speech Union was not involved in her court proceedings against Bradbury. A further court hearing was scheduled for December 2026.

== Politics ==
=== Mana Movement ===
Bradbury was a consultant to the Mana Party until 2013, and provided a draft strategy document for the Internet Party, founded by Kim Dotcom, in 2014. He was influential in promoting public opposition to expansion of the Government Communications Security Bureau's spying powers.

=== Colin Craig defamation trial ===
On 23 September 2016, Bradbury testified as a defence witness in Jordan Williams' defamation trial against Colin Craig, the former leader of the Conservative Party. Williams, the co-founder of the New Zealand Taxpayers' Union, had filed a defamation suit against Craig after the latter had produced a pamphlet entitled "Dirty Politics and Hidden Agenda" attacking Williams, the right-wing blogger Cameron Slater, and a dissident party member John Stringer. In his testimony, Bradbury alleged that Williams had embarked on a political hit job against Craig and defended Craig's pamphlet. Bradbury described the trial as "an angry fight between two people who don't like each other much". Bradbury was also questioned by Williams' lawyer, Peter McKnight, for making alleged defamatory comments against Williams in The Daily Blog.

=== Dirty Politics saga ===
Following the 2014 Dirty Politics scandal, the New Zealand Police searched Bradbury's bank records without a warrant in 2016 as part of their search for the hacker "Rawshark". In August 2019, Bradbury objected to Police using secret evidence to justify their search of his bank records. In early November 2019, Police apologised and reached a settlement with Bradbury for illegally searching his bank records during their search for "Rawshark".

== Views and positions ==
=== South Canterbury Finance bubble ===
Bradbury was highly critical of the late finance company owner Alan Hubbard, whose company was placed under statutory management by the-then justice minister Simon Power.

=== Conversion therapy ban legislation ===
In response to the Government's proposed conversion practices legislation in 2021, which sought to ban gay conversion therapy, Bradbury criticised the bill's five-year prison term as form of "government overreach" that distracted from the Government's failure to address what he regarded as their failed mental health, poverty and housing policies.
