= Max Rashbrooke =

New Zealand political writer (born 1980)

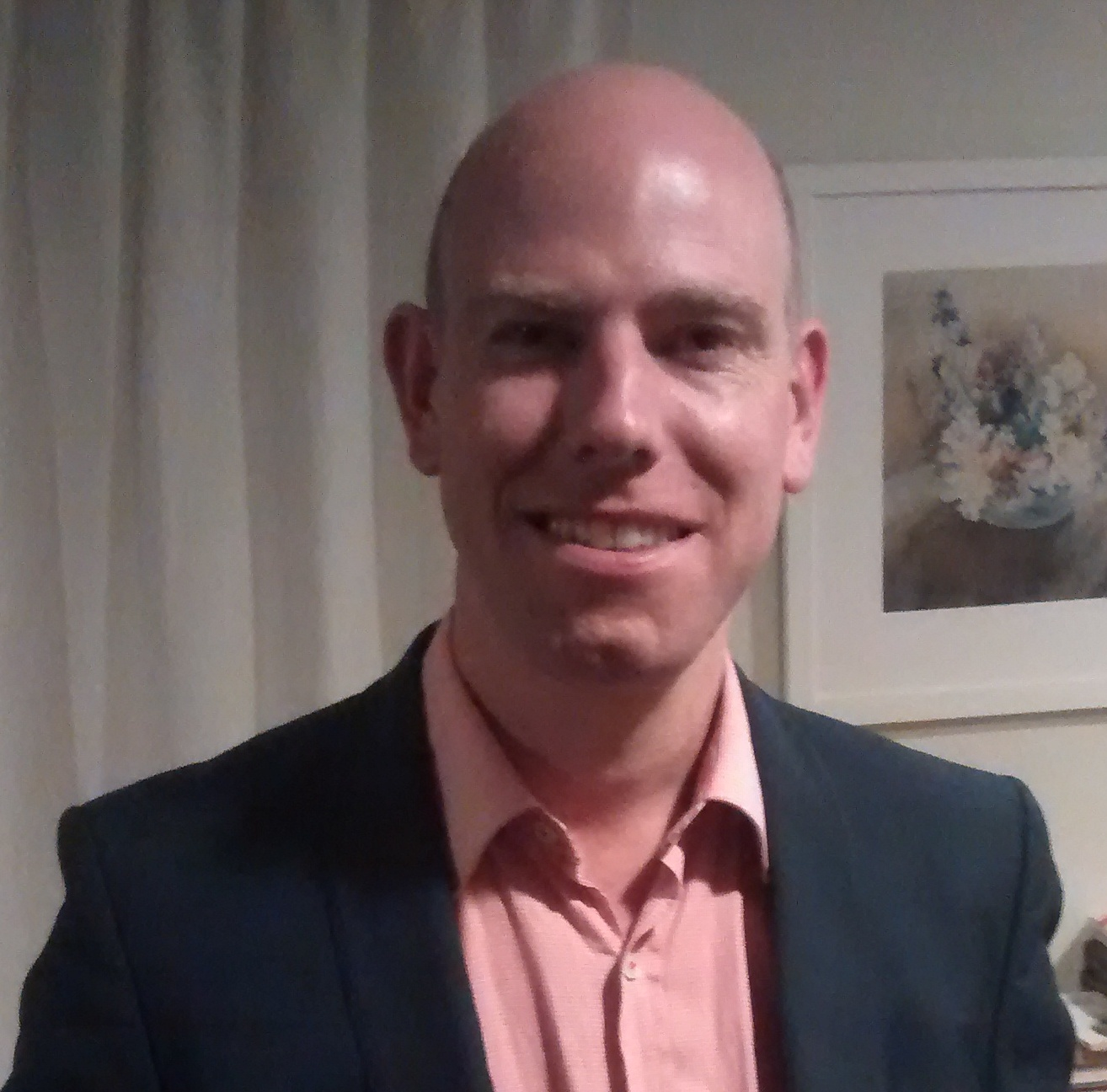
- Rashbrooke, 2015
- Born: 1980 (age 45–46); Wellington, New Zealand
- Education: Victoria University of Wellington (BA (Hons))
- Occupations: Journalist; political writer; researcher
- Writing career
- Subjects: Public policy, including inequality in New Zealand
- Website: Official website

Max Rashbrooke (born 1980) is a New Zealand journalist, political writer and researcher. He is an adjunct senior research fellow in the School of Government at Victoria University of Wellington. He has written extensively on inequality in New Zealand and other aspects of public policy.

== Life and career ==
Rashbrooke was born in Wellington in 1980, where he attended Muritai Primary School and Petone College. At Petone College he received the highest New Zealand score in the 1997 Australasian Schools English Competition. He attended Victoria University of Wellington where he was the editor of student magazine Salient and graduated in 2001 with a BA (Honours) in English literature.

From 2003 to 2010 Rashbrooke was based in London, where he worked as a political journalist, including as a freelance journalist for The Guardian. His experiences in London during the 2008 financial crisis helped develop his political views. After moving back to New Zealand in 2011, he worked as a freelance researcher and commentator, and in 2014 joined Victoria University's Institute for Governance and Policy Studies as a senior associate. When the institute closed in 2023, he became an adjunct senior research fellow in Victoria University's School of Government.

In 2024, Rashbrooke, along with two co-founders, launched the Institute for Democratic and Economic Analysis (IDEA), an independent public policy think-tank.

Rashbrooke's works include four books on inequality in New Zealand published between 2013 and 2021. News website Stuff has said his first book "both coincided with and helped to motivate a national debate about the widening gap between rich and poor". In 2018 he published Government for the Public Good: The Surprising Science of Large-Scale Collective Action. He has received the Bruce Jesson Senior Journalism Award on two occasions, was a 2015 Winston Churchill Fellow, and held the 2020 J.D. Stout Research Fellowship at Victoria University.

== Selected works ==
- Inequality: A New Zealand Crisis (Bridget Williams Books, 2013)
- The Inequality Debate: An Introduction (Bridget Williams Books, 2014)
- Wealth and New Zealand (Bridget Williams Books, 2015)
- Government for the Public Good: The Surprising Science of Large-Scale Collective Action (Bridget Williams Books, 2018)
- Too Much Money: How Wealth Disparities Are Unbalancing Aotearoa New Zealand (Bridget Williams Books, 2021)
