= Capping Show =

Annual student revue in Dunedin, New Zealand

The Capping Show is the name given to the Otago University Students' Association revue. It has run since 1894, making it the world's longest continuously running student revue. Each year the Capping Show is roughly 2 hours long and made up of comedy sketches and musical numbers. It touches on many of the current and not so current events of the past few years, satirizing people and problems in an uncommonly brash manner. Since the University of Otago is located in Dunedin, a good section of the show makes fun of the Dunedin and the university. It is currently being performed at the College Auditorium at the University of Otago. Previous locations include the Princess (later the St James) Theatre, His Majesty's Theatre (later Sammy's nightclub), the Mayfair Theatre, the Regent Theatre, the Town Hall and Castle lecture theatre.

The Capping Show also features the comic talents of the Sexytet, the traditional Capping Sextet, and the Selwyn Ballet. At the height of its popularity, the Capping Concert produced almost half the yearly income of the Otago University Students' Association. In 1909, one performance was used a fundraiser for the projected Students' Union Building (the building on the corner of Leith and Union Streets now occupied by the Allen Hall Theatre).

== Format ==
The show has generally followed the same format since the late-1990s, although there have been minor alterations.

2008 Capping Show: The Capping Show Begins... Forever (returns)

=== Management ===
Capping Show is produced by an event coordinator from the Otago University Students' Association, and all other crew members are current students or recent graduates. The show writers and actors are all current students. The show is currently being produced by Dane Oates, who took over the show from producer Shannon van Rooijen after the 2022 show.

=== Main Sketch ===
A main sketch was introduced by Roger Hall and Lisa Warrington in the late 1980s to introduce structure to the show. The main sketch has a central theme that is followed through its various scenes. The theme is usually either based on a pop culture movie/book (e.g Batman) or a general idea (e.g. the end of the world). The current format of the main sketch involves 4 video segments and 4 stage segments split across the show.

=== Sketches ===
A majority of the show is made up of single sketches. These sketches are unrelated from the main sketch and usually resolved by the end of the scene. In rare occasions, the sketch may link with another sketch later on. The length of the sketches can range from very short (~10 s) to quite long (4–5 min).

=== Video Sketches ===
Since 2000, video sketches have been introduced to the show. Originally used only in the main sketch, they recently expanded to stand alone sketches as a way of covering scene changes. Now they are a vital part of both the main and single sketches. They are displayed on a projector screen next to the stage.

=== Musical Numbers ===
The show usually contains a musical number at the opening and closing of the show. Both numbers are themed with the main sketch and involve the full cast. The lyrics of the songs chosen are changed to relate to the show. The music is usually played by a live band, though in some years the music and lyrics have been pre-recorded. While it does not happen every year, other musical numbers can occur throughout the show that don't relate to the main sketch.

=== Sextet ===
The Capping Sextet is a male voice ensemble consisting of six members who sing three songs during each half of the show. Early surviving records show a group called 'The Coons' appearing in 1903. Although it is not clear what they sang, the majority of material in the early concerts was topical. In 1905 the group was listed as the ‘Coon Tableau and Cake Walk’ and in 1906 they were called a ‘Character Quartette’. 1910 saw their number increase to a ‘Quintette’ and as early as 1911 the group was becoming famous for their topical songs. These were sometimes as long as 15 verses, with each verse commenting on a different local or campus-based topic. The first time the name ‘Sextette’ was used was in 1912, however the group numbered five from 1913 to 1915. With the outbreak of World War I, Capping Concerts from 1916 to 1918 were suspended. 1919 saw the return of the show and the return of a ‘Quintette’. It is in this year that we have the earliest known member of the group – Amos Robinson McKegg, who was a member from 1919 to 1921. His son Robert was a member from 1956 to 1961.

By the 1920s the responsibility of delivering topical verses during the show was now falling almost exclusively on the Sextet. From 1922 to 1925 the group always had six members, and this then fixed the name Sextet. A student at the university during this period, Arthur Porritt (later Queen's Surgeon and Governor General of New Zealand), recalled that, ‘they were always an excellent turn – topical, amusing, lively and energetic’.

Originally the Sextet appeared in dinner suits and later tailcoats and from the 1930s they sang one half of the show in clown costumes. Due to WWII, Capping Concerts were suspended from 1942 to 1944. Herbert ‘Barney’ G. Feltham was given the responsibility of resurrecting the Sextet in 1945. Among the members at this time was Bryan Drake who would go on to create various roles in world premieres of music by Benjamin Britten.

Keith Monagan, a member from 1948 to 1951, recalled in a letter that ‘To attain membership of the Sextet was the height of ‘having arrived’ at university. It was tremendous fun, very much drunken fun, but we were serious in that we practised a great deal…’ This status was reflected in the group being given the stars’ dressing room at the St James Theatre.

In the 1960s the show was so popular that three long play records of the Sextet and other musical parts of the show were made. With the inclusion of women now standard, a group of women decided it was time for a female Sextet. The ODT commented ‘year by year the male domination of the Capping Concert has been whittled away. This year comes the final blow to the tradition. The most exclusive of institutions, the all-male Varsity Sextet, has been joined by a Sextette. The girls do a good job, but their voices are not strong enough and most of their words are lost'. (ODT 3 May 1966).

The female group did not survive at this time but the involvement of women with the Sextet continued in 1969 when Jane Faulkner became the Sextet pianist. She later went on to become Music Director of the group from 1970–1972.

The Sextet and its equally long running companion Selwyn Ballet lapsed in 1973 as the Capping Committee decided to put on a play. The revue format of the show returned in 1975 and the Sextet and Selwyn Ballet resumed their traditional duties. The man given the job of resurrecting the Sextet was Simon Skinner. He contacted then music student Richard Madden. Richard and his brother Gerald, both from a musical family and members of the St Paul’s Cathedral Choir, brought in friends who also had good musical and choral backgrounds. They were given free licence to do what they wanted with the format, but knew that songs of the topical nature were part of the show’s history. It was at this time that the 4–6-part harmony developed through the arranging skills of Richard Madden and the influence of a visit to Dunedin by the Kings’ Singers in 1972. Thus, audiences began to enjoy the Sextet not only for their wit but also the arrangements that they performed. During the late 1970s, Marama Singers was also a male group run by Dr Patrick Little, and eventually repertoire from the two groups began to merge.

1975 saw the introduction of pierrot make-up. This, along with the clown costumes, immediately identifies the group to the public and continues today.

Since the late 1970s the group has continued to grow, helped by the creative wit of the members, the famous arrangements done by Prof John Drummond, and lyrics supplied to them from the late Nigel Eastgate. Never a member of the group, Nigel penned the legendary ‘Sideways,’ ‘Tight Mistress’ and ‘Tired of Muldoon’ lyrics as well as dozens of topical songs for more than 40 years for the group.

Keith Stronach, a member in the early 1930s, kept sending lyrics to the group for more than 20 years. Similarly, Bill Hilliker, a member in 1929, 1933 and 1934, maintained a lifelong interest in the Sextet, auditioning members until the early 1960s. Ian C. Robertson sang in the group in the early 1960s but continued to assist them musically until 1969. It is people such as these that, along with the dedicated members that has enabled the Sextet to survive.

Notable former members include Peter Chin, Sir William Southgate, Bryan Drake, Dr John Borrie, Geoffrey de Lautour, Roger Wilson, Piri Sciascia, Richard Madden, Martin Snell, Simon O'Neill, Jonathan Lemalu, Tecwyn Evans, and Robbie Schmidt.

Less well-known members include Mark Wigglesworth, Dominic Edmond, and Jack Fisher.

Recently, some songs have stuck with students at Otago University, becoming known as 'modern classics'. These songs include the ever-loved 'Uncle Kevin' (Slice of Heaven), 'Jerkin It' (Tragedy/Money, Money, Money), 'Vape' (Faith), and 'Pepperoni With Stuffed Crust' (Another One Bites the Dust).

=== Sexytet ===
The Sexytet is the female a cappella singing group, formed as a all-girls counterpart to the sextet. The sexytet have been widely cited as forming in 2001, but footage in the OUSA archive shows a female a capella group performing in the 2000 Capping Show, and a thesis on the Sextet in the Hocken recounts the Sexytet being part of the show as early as 1999. They perform in both the first and second half of the show. The group rewrites and arranges popular songs. Their now-traditional outfit echoes a 1950s housewife, with a new pattern every year. In the most recent survey of show participants the Sexytet were rated as the most popular part of the show.

=== Selwyn Ballet ===
The Selwyn Ballet is a traditionally all-male ballet company made up of students from the Selwyn College, Otago. Formed in 1928, they are the oldest ballet company in New Zealand. They traditionally perform a ballet number at the end of the first half. In 2023 the ballet included girls from Selwyn College for the first time in the form of an opening Drum & Bass themed sketch introducing the ballet, with the girls then joining back in towards the end of the ballet.

=== Other Items ===
Over the years Capping Concerts have included orchestral and band items, waxworks, magic acts, skating acts, haka, negro spirituals, Knox and faculty farces, modern dance (contributed by Dance Arts, the pioneering New Zealand modern dance company based at the Phys Ed school), Dunedin Sound rock groups (Sneaky Feelings and the Verlaines), a Roger Hall play ("The Quiz" in its world premiere production) and female impersonators. It was only after the Second World War that women appeared on stage in the Capping Concerts. The most artistically ambitious period of the Capping Concert's history was the early 1970s when, under the direction of Marshall Seifert, Feet (a parody version of Hair), compressed versions of Jesus Christ, Superstar and Tommy were presented along with two original rock operas, one inspired by a Colin McCahon painting and the other written by members of the successful Dunedin rock group, Mother Goose.

== Best of ==
Occasionally, usually every three years, a show is put on as part of the Dunedin Fringe Festival. Usually 40 minutes long, it consists of sketches from the previous three years of capping show. The most recent one was in the 2011 Fringe festival.

== Controversies ==
In 1972, the show was criticised for being "full of naughty, behind-hand grot humor'' and in 1974, the show took a more trippy and psychedelic turn, with attendees reported to be on acid.

In 2010, Rape Crisis Dunedin accused the Sextet of trivialising rape and sexual abuse. In response, the line within the offending Sextet song was removed. Rape Crisis Dunedin declined to be the Otago University Students Association (OUSA) official Capping Show charity for that year. Rape Crisis Dunedin was the official Capping Show charity again in 2014.

== Capping Show themes ==
- 2026 – SQUEAL: A Capping Show Horror
- 2025 – How To Train Your Fresher
- 2024 – Beezie
- 2023 – Back To The Flat
- 2022 – Campus Nine-Nine
- 2021 – Larry Thotter And The Chambers Of The Bong
- 2020 – Flatatouille
- 2019 – The Lord of the Degrees
- 2018 – Scarfie Things
- 2017 – The Cat in the Cap
- 2016 – Making Grad
- 2015 – Campus Watch
- 2014 – A Capping Carol: The Night Before Hyde Street
- 2013 – The Wizard of Capping Show
- 2012 – Capocalypse
- 2011 – Let There Be Capping Show
- 2010 – Alice in Cappingland
- 2009 – Ghostbusters
- 2008 – The Capping Show Begins
- 2007 – Pirates of the Capping Show: The Curse of the Pearl Necklace
- 2006 – 2 Crass 2 Humorous
- 2005 – Back to the Capping Show
- 2004 – 007: You Only Laugh Twice
- 2003 – Scarfie Wars
- 2002 – Harry Pothead gets the Philosopher Stoned
- 2001 – Hannabel Lecturer
- 2000 – Scarfies
- 1999 – Otagotubbies
- 1998 – Spice
- 1997 – Up The Deep End
- 1996 – The Y Files
- 1995 – The Jesus Christ Not Again Capping Show
- 1994 – Still Crazy After All These Years (Centenary show)
- 1993 - The Valley of the Moa
- 1992 - Aladdin & His Wonderful Lamp
- 1991 - Scarfie Trek
- 1990 – Hokonui Jones and the Sword of Destiny
- 1989 – Peters Pantomime
- 1988 - The Wozard of IZ
- 1987 - Unknown
- 1986 - Jack and the Beanstalk
- 1985 - Cinderella
- 1984 – Robin Hood
- 1983 - Unknown
- 1982 - Apocalypso Now
- 1981 – The King and Di
- 1980 - F.Alice in Wonderland
- 1979 - Knight In Knight Out
- 1978 - Hoofhearted The Last Great Capping Show?
- 1977 - Capricious Cabaret
- 1976 - The Great White Elephant Show
- 1975 - The End
- 1894 to 1974 - Unknown

== Notable Former Members ==
- David McPhail – Actor/Writer
- Jon Gadsby – Actor/Writer
- Derek Payne - Television Presenter
- Graeme Wardrop - Guitarist
- Jeremy Elwood – Stand Up Comedian/Actor
- Simon McKinney – Stand Up Comedian/Actor
- Matt Gibb – Children's Television Host
- Melissa Katherine - Comedian
- Tom Hazledine – Director/actor
- Chris Taine – Documentary Director
- Josh Thomson – Stand Up Comedian/Actor/Director
- Roger Hall – Playwright
- Brent Hodge – Documentary Director/Producer
- Serena Cotton – Actor
- Samantha Jukes – Actor
- Timothy Foley – Actor
- Julie Noever – Theatre Director
- Mark Neilson – Actor/Writer
- Sam Smith – Writer/Comedian
- Andrew Munro – Actor
- Louise Beuvink – Comedian
- Jesse Griffin – Comedian
- Abby Howells - Comedian
