= Matthew Hooton =

New Zealand political consultant and editor

Matthew Owen Hooton (born circa 1972–1973) is a former adviser to the National and ACT parties, lobbyist, political commentator and newspaper editor. He served as a press secretary in the Fourth National Government, worked as a political strategist for National Party leaders Don Brash and Todd Muller, and also advised the ACT party and Mayor of Auckland Wayne Brown. In June 2026, Hooton became the editor of the Wellington newspaper, The Post.

== Early life and education ==
Hooton studied at Auckland Grammar School and later pursued a Bachelor of law at the University of Auckland. In 1990, he took up a summer speech-writing job for the-then Education Minister Lockwood Smith. In 1996, he visited India, China, Mongolia and Sri Lanka before returning to work as a parliamentary press secretary for Smith in 1997. Hooton resigned from his parliamentary job following the 1999 New Zealand general election.

== Consultancy work ==
From 2000, Hooton worked as Fonterra's head of communications for two years. In 2003, he worked as an adviser to National Party leader Don Brash and supported his leadership campaign. Hooton also advised Brash's campaign during the 2005 New Zealand general election. Hooton also worked as a consultant for the Seafood Industry Council, Asia-Pacific Economic Cooperation, the Treaty Tribes Coalition and PwC.

After another year of university education in 2003, Hooton founded a public relations and lobbying company called Exceltium in 2005. In 2008, Exceltium successfully lobbied the Kyoto Forestry Association into allowing their clients to participate in the New Zealand Emissions Trading Scheme.

During the 2014 New Zealand general election, Hooton worked for the National Party's campaign, with his activities being documented in independent journalist Nicky Hager's book Dirty Politics. During the 2017 New Zealand general election, Hooton and Exceltium work as strategic advisers for the ACT Party. Prior to the 2020 New Zealand general election, Hooton resigned as a staff member on National Party leader Todd Muller's campaign in August 2020, citing the long commute between Auckland and Wellington.

== Honorary consul to Mongolia ==
In December 2017, Hooton was appointed as New Zealand's honorary consul to Mongolia. He also worked as a visiting associate professor teaching philosophy at the National University of Mongolia. In early 2025, Hooton helped organise Foreign Minister Winston Peters' state visit to Mongolia.

== Media career ==
In mid-June 2026, Hooton became the editor of the Wellington daily newspaper, The Post, which is owned by Stuff.

== Legal issues ==
In September 2024, Hooton and left-wing activist and blogger Martyn Bradbury received legal letters former National Party leader Don Brash's legal counsel Stephen Franks after Hooton criticised Brash's character and accused him of promoting anti-Māori sentiment during a podcast hosted by Bradbury. Following the complaint, Hooton apologised for his remarks about Brash. Brash subsequently sued Hooton for defamation. After unsuccessfully attempting to get Brash's lawsuit against him dismissed by the High Court, Hooton challenged Brash's lawsuit and the High Court's ruling at the Court of Appeal in late June 2026.

== Personal life ==
Hooton is married to Cathy Wood and has one child. In 2014, Hooton underwent alcohol addiction treatment.
