= Stephen Franks =

New Zealand politician (born 1950), lawyer, free speech activist

Stephen Leslie Franks (born 1950) in Wellington, New Zealand, is a commercial lawyer and founder of the commercial law firm, Franks Ogilvie. At one time, he was chairman and Partner of the large firm Chapman Tripp. Franks has been a member of two political parties. He previously served as a List MP for the right-wing ACT New Zealand (Association of Consumers and Taxpayers). He then stood unsuccessfully for the National Party for the 2008 general election. Franks is also a media commentator and writer on legal and commercial topics. He is also chair of the advocacy group Free Speech Union.

== Early life ==
Franks was educated at Taihape College, and then studied law at Victoria University of Wellington. In 1973, he was president of the Law Faculty Club (now the Victoria University of Wellington Law Students' Society), and he graduated from Victoria with a Bachelor of Laws (Honours) degree in 1974, and a Bachelor of Arts degree the following year. Franks was admitted to the bar in 1975, and in 1981, he received a Diploma in Accounting from Victoria.

Prior to entering Parliament in 1999, Franks' professional appointments included: being a member of the Securities Commission, deputy chairman (1999) of the Market Surveillance Panel (MSP) of the New Zealand Stock Exchange having been a member of the MSP from its inception for nine years, and a Council member of the Institute of Directors in New Zealand.

== Member of Parliament: 1999–2005 ==
New Zealand Parliament
Years	Term	Electorate	List	Party
1999–2002	46th	List	3	ACT
2002–2005	47th	List	4	ACT

Franks entered Parliament in the 1999 election, having been ranked in third place on the party list for the ACT Party, and coming fourth in Rongotai electorate. This high ranking (above several sitting MPs) was indicative of ACT's high hopes for Franks at the time – as a prominent lawyer, he was generally regarded as a significant asset for the party. In 2002 he stood in Wellington Central, coming third place. He was re-elected on the party list. During his six years in Parliament he was ACT spokesman for Justice, Corrections, the Police and Commerce. He added Maori Affairs and Sport in the last three years.

When Prebble announced his retirement from politics in early 2004, Franks was one of the four candidates who sought to take his place as leader of ACT. Franks ran on a platform of restoring the party's core message. Despite receiving the endorsement of party founder Roger Douglas, he was eventually defeated by Rodney Hide. After Hide became leader of the ACT party on 13 June, Franks remained the party's spokesperson for justice.

== 2005 and 2008 elections ==
Franks lost his seat in Parliament in the 2005 New Zealand general election when the total percentage of the popular vote for ACT reduced the ACT Party to two seats in Parliament.

Franks was National Party candidate for Wellington Central for the 2008 general election, being number 60 on the National Party list. He lost the contest by 1,904 votes to the Labour's Grant Robertson.

== Franks Ogilvie ==
Following the 2005 general election, Franks returned to practising law, rejoining his old firm, Chapman Tripp as a consultant. He later left this firm to set up his own commercial and public law practice, Franks Ogilvie.

As of 2008, his business interests include his public law practice, several company directorships, farming and manuka honey beekeeping. Between 2009 and 2010, Franks served on the Minister of Energy's expert advisory group on New Zealand's electricity market structure. He was also a member of the Securities Commission, the Council of the Institute of Directors New Zealand (IoD NZ) and the New Zealand Stock Exchange's Market Surveillance Panel. Franks was also involved in the creation of the creation of dairy cooperative Fonterra, the drafting of the Electricity Industry Reform Act 1998, the privatisation of the former Telecom New Zealand company and advised the World Bank about the legal aspects of corporatisation and privatisation.

In 2023, Franks Olgilvie led a legal challenge to force the Local Government Minister Nanaia Mahuta to release her legal advice that co-governance was required in the Sixth Labour Government's Three Waters reform programme under the framework of the Treaty of Waitangi. After his legal challenged was dismissed by the courts, Franks appealed to the Court of Appeal of New Zealand, which upheld the dismissal. Franks subsequently worked with the lobby group New Zealand Taxpayers' Union to develop a repeal and replacement legislation for Three Waters called the "Local Water Infrastructure Bill."

As former National and ACT leader Don Brash's legal counsel, Franks issued legal letters to left-wing blogger Martyn Bradbury and former National Party staffer and lobbyist Matthew Hooton after the latter made remarks accusing Brash of promoting anti-Māori sentiment during a Working Group podcast in September 2024; in which Bradbury served as a co-host. Following the complaint, Bradbury released a statement stating that Hooton had apologised for his remarks about Brash.

In February 2025, Franks Ogilvie sent legal letters to 20 medical practices on behalf of the conservative advocacy group "Inflection Point" warning that they could be held liable for future litigation if they were found to be "lax" when offering gender affirming medical services. In response, Wellington lawyer Tess Upperton and Paul Thistoll of the advocacy group "Countering Hate Speech Aotearoa" filed complaints against Franks and his legal practice with the New Zealand Law Society, accusing them of intimidation. Franks' legal letters were also the subject of a Police complaint. In response, Franks defended the letters, describing the Police complaint as a joke and saying that the health provider Te Whatu Ora should have sent similar letters to these health practices. Te Whatu Ora's chief medical officer Professor Dame Helen Stokes-Lampard said that the organisation would support the health practices in response to legal action.

The Law Society ultimately received six complaints about Franks and his law firm though none were from the 20 medical and health practitioners who had received his legal letters. The complainants alleged that Franks and his law firm had committed professional misconduct issues including threatening legal action, causing distress, failing to exercise independent political judgment, advancing a controversial political stance and violating professional standards. In October 2025, a Law Society standards committee dismissed five of the complaints except that he failed to use legal processes for a "proper purpose." Franks was censured for unsatisfactory conduct and issued with an undisclosed fine. In response, Franks appealed the decision, defending the letters as "conventional correspondence." In March 2026, the Legal Complaints Review Officer Fraser Goldsmith vacated the Law Society standards committee's fine and censure of Franks and Franks Olgilvie. Franks welcomed the quashing of the fine and censure as a matter of "writing truthfully on behalf of a client warning recipients of legal risks." In June 2026, Franks proposed a new law banning professional bodies from using their disciplinary powers to advance or oppose contentious political views.

== Free Speech Coalition/Union ==
By April 2019, Franks had become a spokesperson for the advocacy group "Free Speech Coalition" (the predecessor to the Free Speech Union). On 26 April, he expressed disagreement with Labour MPs Louisa Wall and Andrew Little's calls for tighter regulation of so-called hate speech, saying: "We're seeing an approach to free speech and to our traditional freedoms that's absolutely novel among our politicians."

By November 2025, Franks had become the chief executive of the Free Speech Union, succeeding its former chief executive Jonathan Ayling. During his tenure, the Union lobbied the Sixth National Government into halting the Law Commission's work on hate speech legislation and incorporating free speech provisions and institutional neutrality for tertiary education providers in the Education and Training (System Reform) Amendment Act 2026.

In July 2026, The Post journalist Andrea Vance published a report suggesting that the Free Speech Union was seeking to influence the composition of the Medical Council of New Zealand by lobbying the Health Minister Simeon Brown into appointing two FSU-linked individuals, former FSU chair Robert Mulgan and controversial doctor Manoja Kalupahana. In response, Franks accused The Post of not asking Brown "genuine questions" about the Medical Council's appointment process and denied that the FSU had lobbied for the appointment. He contended that the media should not decide which political opinions were compatible with the public service, and described the newspaper's reporting as "tripe."

== Personal life ==
Franks is married to Catharine. They have three daughters and a son. He also owns a 2,000 hectare manuka and grazing block. Franks' recreational interests have also included mountain biking and kayaking.
