= Radio One (New Zealand) =

- Dunedin; New Zealand
- Frequency: 91.0 MHz

Programming
- Format: Student radio

Ownership
- Owner: Otago University Students' Association (OUSA)

History
- First air date: 1984
- Former call signs: 4SAO

Links
- Website: www.r1.co.nz

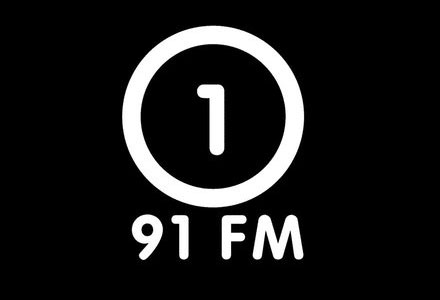
Radio One Logo

Radio One is a student radio station operating from the University of Otago in Dunedin, New Zealand. It broadcasts on a frequency of 91.0 MHz. it is a member of the Student Radio Network group of stations, most of which are run from or affiliated with tertiary education providers and campuses in Aotearoa.

The impetus for the station began with an open letter to the President of the Otago University Students' Association (OUSA) (then Phyllis Comerford) from Alastair Thomson, who had worked on the Waikato University student radio station. This letter brought together other interested parties including members of the bands Netherworld Dancing Toys and The Verlaines. Graham Cockroft was the first station manager. With a grant from the OUSA of approximately $12,000, the station first went to air in early 1984 broadcasting from the OUSA's former boardroom. The station initially ran on a part-time basis during the university year until the 1986 when it started operating round-the-clock throughout the year. In 1987 Radio One shifted into a new annex to the Student Union building which was specifically designed to house the station, the OUSA's offices, and the university's student newspaper Critic Te Ārohi. The station celebrated its 25th birthday at the beginning of 2009.

In the station's early years, its 100 Watt transmitter was located on the top of the campus's tallest building (the 11-storey Richardson Building, then known as the Hocken Building), but since the 1987 it has had a transmitter on the top of Mount Cargill, 12 kilometres north of the campus. This gives the station a range which covers much of coastal Otago, from Oamaru to past Balclutha.

The changes to become a year-round station operating from purpose-built facilities and expanded coverage were undertaken by the 1986 station manager Chris Lambourne. Radio One can now be heard anywhere in the world as it streams all content in 128 kbit/s stereo mp3 over the internet.

The station is run by a small team of paid staff, and a large number of volunteer announcers, DJs and programmers, with a small paid staff. It runs a wide variety of general interest and specialist shows and is a welcoming space in which students and other community members can volunteer, receiving training and mentoring to express themselves and share local music.

The station also hosts and supports frequent gigs across Dunedin, including all ages and local high school band shows, platforming up and coming musicians. It runs competitions, promotions and other events such as Radio One Market Day, Album of the Week, Golden Ticket, Win a Weekend Getaway etc.

== The Onecard Scheme ==
In 1986, the station launched an innovative scheme to raise money to support the station - a loyalty card called "The Rad-One Card" (more recently just "The Onecard"). This gave subscribers ("Rad-Ones") the opportunity to gain discounts at local stores and events, and to enter on-air competitions in return for a small annual fee. The scheme has been widely adopted by other student radio stations around New Zealand.

In 2025 the Radio One card was moved to an online system by OUSA and rebranded as the "Green Card", due to the increased cost in producing physical cards, the reduction in vendors wanting to take part in the discount scheme, and a drop in interest for the card from students. Unfortunately the new card did not take off and the decision was made to discontinue the card in any format in 2026.

== Notable former and current staff ==
- Shayne Carter
- Wallace Chapman
- Charlotte Glennie
- Sam Hayes
- Aaron Hawkins
- Sean Norling
- Jan Hellriegel
- Lesley Paris
- David Pine
- Dave "Norrie" Borrie
- Quintin Jane
- Zac Hoffman
