= Salient (magazine) =

Weekly students' magazine at Victoria University of Wellington

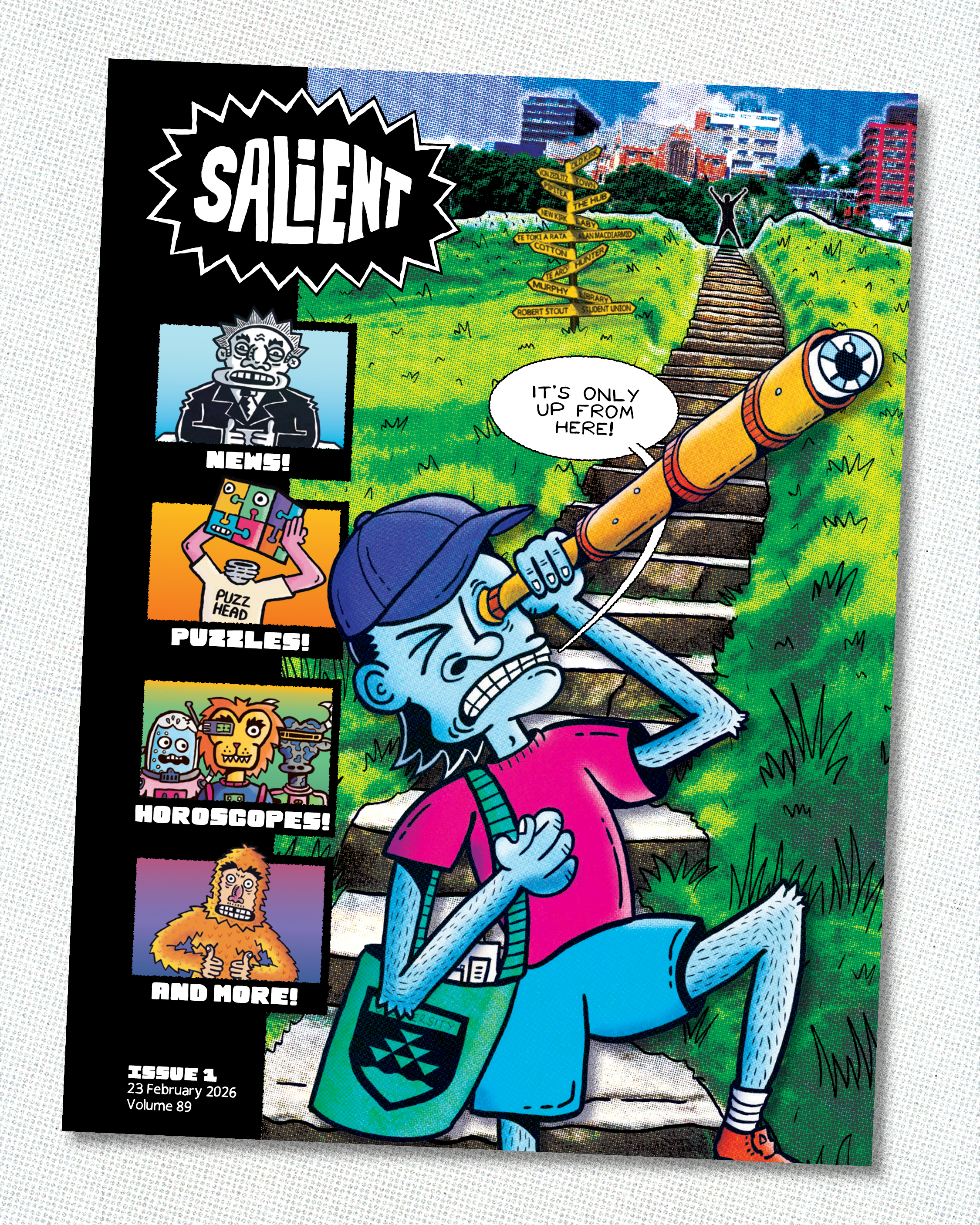
- Salient logo and cover of the 23 February 2026 issue, designed by Jim Higgs
- Editor: Phoebe Robertson
- Designer: Jim Higgs
- Frequency: Weekly during non-summer trimesters (25 issues annually)
- Circulation: 16,000
- Founded: 1938
- Company: Victoria University of Wellington Students' Association
- Based in: Kelburn, Wellington, New Zealand
- Language: English, Māori
- Website: salient.org.nz
- OCLC: 227003028

Salient is the weekly magazine of the Victoria University of Wellington Students' Association (VUWSA) in New Zealand. It was established in 1938 and originally published in newspaper format, but is currently published as a magazine. Salient's style and editorial position can change from year to year due to changes in editors, but the magazine has generally taken a left-wing stance.

== Organisation and history ==
=== Origins ===
The student magazine of Victoria University of Wellington has been published under a number of different titles since the early twentieth century: Spike (1902–1964), Smad (1930–1937), and Salient (1938–present). Salient was originally published in newspaper format, but is currently published as a print magazine and online.

=== Editor ===
The Salient editor-in-chief is a VUWSA employee operating under a charter that grants editorial independence. The editor is appointed and employed under a fixed-term contract that covers, roughly, the beginning to the end of the academic year. Previous involvement with the magazine is not a prerequisite for applicants, although most have had some role at Salient before their appointment. At various times in Salient's history, and increasingly since 2011, the editorship has been shared by two people. Notable past editors include former Prime Minister Geoffrey Palmer, editor of Metro magazine Simon Wilson, independent publisher Roger Steele (NZOM), Queen's Counsel Hugh Rennie, independent investigative writers such as David Harcourt and The Spinoff's editor at-large Toby Manhire.

==== Former editors ====
- 2026 — Phoebe Robertson
- 2025 — Will Irvine (resigned), Phoebe Robertson (acting editor)
- 2024 — Phoebe Robertson
- 2023 — Francesca Pietkiewicz and Maia Ingoe
- 2022 — Janhavi Gosavi
- 2021 — Sally Ward and Matthew Casey
- 2020 — Kirsty Frame and Rachel Trow
- 2019 — Kii Small and Taylor Galmiche
- 2018 — Louise Lin
- 2017 — Tuioleloto Laura Toailoa and Tim Manktelow
- 2016 — Emma Hurley and Jayne Mulligan
- 2015 — Sam McChesney
- 2014 — Cam Price and Duncan McLachlan
- 2013 — Molly McCarthy and Stella Blake-Kelly
- 2012 — Ollie Neas and Asher Emanuel
- 2011 — Uther Dean and Elle Hunt
- 2010 — Sarah Robson
- 2009 — Jackson James Wood
- 2008 — Tristan Egarr
- 2007 — Steve Nicoll
- 2006 — James Robinson
- 2005 — Emily Braunstein
- 2004 — Sarah Barnett
- 2003 — Michael Appleton
- 2002 — Max Rashbrooke
- 2001 — Nikki Burrows
- 2000 — Nikki Burrows
- 1999 — Mike Beggs
- 1998 — Jonathan Hill
- 1997 — Toby Manhire
- 1996 — James Palmer
- 1995 — Vic Waghorn
- 1994 — Andrew Chick
- 1993 — Tony Smith
- 1992 — Cathie Sheat
- 1991 — Carl Dawson
- 1990 — Barbara Duke
- 1989 — Belinda Howard
- 1988 — Bernie Steeds
- 1987 — Grant O'Neill
- 1986 — Richard Adams
- 1985 — Jane Hurley
- 1984 — Sally Zwartz
- 1983 — Mark Cubey
- 1982 — Mark Wilson
- 1981 — Stephen A'Court
- 1980 — Stephen A'Court
- 1979 — Peter Beach
- 1978 — Simon Wilson
- 1977 — David Murray
- 1976 — John Ryall
- 1975 — Antony Ward, Mark Derby, Bruce Robinson
- 1974 — Roger Steele
- 1973 — Peter Franks, Roger Steele
- 1972 — Gil Peterson
- 1971 — Roger Cruickshank, George Rosenberg
- 1970 — David Harcourt
- 1969 — Roger Wilde
- 1968 — Bill Logan
- 1967 — Gerard Curry, Barrie Saunders
- 1966 — Hugh Rennie
- 1965 — Hugh Rennie, John Llewellyn
- 1964 — Bill Alexander, David Wright, Anthony Haas
- 1963 — Geoffrey Palmer, Ian Grant, Robin Bromby
- 1962 — Murray White
- 1961 — Baldwin March
- 1960 — Ian Grant
- 1959 — Colin Bickler
- 1958 — Terry Kelliher
- 1957 — Conrad Bollinger, Antony Wood
- 1956 — Nick Turner
- 1955 — Brian Shaw
- 1954 — Dan Donovan
- 1953 — Trevor Hill
- 1952 — Trevor Hill
- 1951 — Bill Cameron, Maurice McIntyre
- 1950 — Denny Garrett
- 1949 — Peter Jenkins, Denny Garrett
- 1948 — Bill Cameron, Jean Melling, Alec McLeod
- 1947 — Alec McLeod
- 1946 — Bruce Milburn, Lyster Paul, Bill Cameron
- 1945 — W.K.T. (Kemp) Fowler
- 1944 — W.K.T. (Kemp) Fowler
- 1943 — Cecil Crompton
- 1942 — George Turner, Cecil Crompton
- 1941 — Shirley Grinlinton
- 1940 — Maurice Boyd
- 1939 — Derek Freeman
- 1938 — A.H. (Bonk) Scotney

=== News ===
Salient news focuses on student issues, the students' association and the university, but has also reported on national and international news.

Previous news writers are:

- Dan Moskovitz, Martha Schenk, Ryan Cleland, Otis Whinney, Ali Cook (2026)
- Dan Moskovitz, Fergus Goodall-Smith, Walter Hamer Zamalis and Darcy Lawrey (2025)
- Will Irvine and Ethan Rogacion (2024)
- Zoë Mills and Ethan Manera (2023)
- Beth Mountford and Azaria Howell (2022)
- Sophie Boot (2014)
- Chris McIntyre (2013)
- Stella Blake-Kelly and Hugo McKinnon (2011)
- Molly McCarthy (2010)
- Michael Oliver (2009)
- Seonah Choi (2008)
- Laura McQuillan (2007)
- Nicola Kean (2006)
- Keith Ng (2004–2005)

Salient is a member of the Aotearoa Student Press Association (ASPA), which has periodically had a press gallery journalist in the New Zealand House of Representatives.

=== Design ===
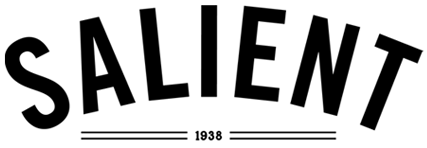
Salient's 2013 logo

Salient employs a full-time designer who is responsible for the magazine's appearance. Because the designer is typically employed for a one-year term, the magazine's visual aesthetic can change significantly from year to year.

=== Comics ===
Salient has contained a number of comics and cartoons, which traditionally appear on the last page. Past comics such as ASCII (originally published in University of Waikato's Nexus magazine), and Grant Buist's Brunswick have won awards, with ASCII receiving an ASPA award in 2005. Previous comics have included Being Blind, Man, ASCII Newtown Ghetto Anger, The Chronicle, The Sando, Uni Life, Super Academic Friends, The Academic Idol Comic, and G33K by Sparx. Walter Hamer Zamalis was Salient's political cartoonist from 2024 to 2025.

=== Website ===
In addition to print publication, Salient has a frequently-updated website. The website, redeveloped in 2013, received an ASPA best-website award that year. Salient publishes an email newsletter, "Sincerely Salient", includes news round-ups, local events, and other features. Salient's archives were removed from public view after a late-2019 website upgrade, resulting in the creation of an independent Salient Archive website which restored public access to 9,879 articles.

=== Video ===
Salient had a video-production arm, Salient TV, New Zealand's only department dedicated to video content from a student publication. Salient TV videos included interviews, comedy sketches, and content focused on student interests. The videos were primarily found on the magazine's Facebook page. Salient TV ended in 2019.

=== Radio station ===
Salient FM
- Wellington; New Zealand
- Frequency: 88.3 FM

Programming
- Format: Student radio

History
- First air date: 2007

Salient FM (known as VBC until 2015) was a non-profit station which operated from 2007 to 2019, replacing Radio Active as the university's campus-based, student-oriented radio station. It was funded by the university and VUWSA through the Salient budget, supplemented by advertisers and sponsors.

In October 2013, VUWSA held a referendum about continuing to fund the station after a student request at VUWSA's annual general meeting. Of 2,105 votes cast, 61 percent favoured continuing to fund VBC.

In May 2014, VUWSA President Sonya Clark was a trustee of the defunct VBC Trust to wind it down so VUWSA could take control of the station. The trust owed Inland Revenue about $3,000 in unpaid tax, which Clark said that VUWSA intended to pay. The 2014 Salient editors expressed an interest in transforming VBC into "Salient Radio", and the station was rebranded Salient FM the following year.

Salient FM had a diverse format targeted at Victoria University of Wellington students. Alternative, electronic, and hip-hop music was played, and the station encouraged Wellingtonian and New Zealand musical acts. The station also hosted a number of political and current-affairs shows, examining political issues and policies relevant to VUW students.

In December 2019, Salient FM was shut down after a decision by VUWSA CEO Matthew Tucker. The reason was not made public, an Official Investigation Act request was filed to investigate if closing the station was unconstitutional. Salient FM editors Jazz Kane and Nav Nair said, "We're pretty confident that it is entirely unconstitutional". After the closure of Salient FM, the magazine created Salient Podcasts.

== Views ==
Due to Salient's changing editorial position (each editor typically holding the position for a one-year period), views expressed in the magazine have varied throughout its history. It has generally taken a left-wing approach to politics.

=== Maoism (1964-1981) ===
Many editors and contributors to Salient were members of the Wellington Marxist-Leninist Organisation (MILO), a Maoist-aligned group with substantial student membership at the time. Consequently, much content published during this period was politically charged and Maoist-leaning. This included a solicitation of funds for the Viet Cong.

=== Te Ao Mārama (1973–1974 and since 1997) ===
Te Ao Mārama is an issue of Salient which focuses on Māori issues. The Ngā Tamatoa and Te Reo Māori Society political groups influenced the first publication of Te Ao Mārama in 1973 during Māori Language Week, under editor Roger Steele, in an attempt to support te reo Māori (the Māori language) on campus. According to Max Nichol, "Steele credits the Te Reo Māori Society with the idea, and Ngā Tamatoa with putting the issue of revitalising te reo on the agenda in the first place." Steele's editing successors did not continue this to the same degree; "it was not until 1997 that Te Ao Mārama was enshrined in VUWSA's constitution, obliging Salient to produce a Māori-language issue annually."

Te Ao Mārama is a tradition that facilitates Māori voices and issues in the university community. In 2022, Te Ao Mārama was published for the first time in English and Māori. Under editor Janhavi Gosavi, the issue was guest-edited by Areta Pakinga.

=== Women's rights ===
During the 1980s, Salient began to devote more space to women's rights. Sally Zwartz became the second female editor in 1984; the first was Shirley Grinlington in 1941, who may "perhaps [have] gained her position due to the dip in the number of male students during World War Two."

=== Gay and lesbian liberation ===
Salient published a LGBTQ+ edition, Queerlient, which was guest-edited in colaboration with UniQ Te Herenga Waka (UniQ THW). It was formerly known as Gaylient. In 2026 Queerlient was discontinued by Salient and an online publication by the same name was produced by UniQ THW.

== Issues ==
=== 1985 Defamation allegations and sexual-harassment policy ===
1985 editor Jane Hurley faced a legal threat from the university's history department after she co-edited the VUWSA Student Handbook, which "provided course critiques so that students could assess for themselves which courses and programmes of study might appeal to them." The handbook noted that a professor in the department was known for sexual harassment; the department threatened the editors with a defamation suit and demanded a retraction. In the first 1985 issue of Salient, Hurley tried to appease the department by writing that the claims of sexual harassment may have suggested a higher level of severity, and clarified the misconduct as "milder" forms of harassment such as "unwanted comments, the innuendo, the disparagement of women simply because they are women." Hurley's reporting was partly responsible for encouraging Victoria University to enforce a sexual-harassment policy the following year, and working to give students support for the issue.

=== 1995 Waghorn affair ===
A special general meeting of VUWSA was called in June 1995 to dismiss editor Vic Waghorn. The motion to dismiss Waghorn at the meeting was defeated 250 to 3, but personal grievances and accusations that she had misappropriated funds led to her suspension in September by the VUWSA executive. Waghorn changed the cover of the final issue of Salient "to a cartoon depiction of cunnilingus captioned 'suck it hard'", but most of the covers were removed before publication. The affair led to a change to the VUWSA constitution, making it more difficult to dismiss a Salient editor in the future.

=== 2005 fee-increase leak and injunction ===
In September 2005, the university's vice-chancellor obtained an injunction to prevent an issue of Salient from distribution; this was thought to be a first in the magazine's history. The issue contained information obtained from leaked university council documents with details about possible university fee increases of five to 10 percent. The controversy made national media, including television news. The university failed to realise that the information was on the ASPA newswire, and had been published in several other student magazines and on the internet. Distribution of Salient was permitted four days late after it and the university reached an out-of-court settlement. The documents were returned to the university, reportedly with pictures of male genitalia drawn on them.

=== 2006 Chinese slur ===
In April 2006, Salient published a short piece which placed Han Chinese people, along with poisonous snakes and penguins, on a list of the "top five species we should be wary of". The "joke" upset the Chinese community and caused protests from Chinese students and the Chinese embassy. Accused of racism, editor James Robinson apologised: "It was a ridiculous jab that was honestly so stupid I didn't even think twice about it." Robinson also said that people who were offended had misinterpreted it ("We put 'the Chinese' between 'penguins' and 'very poisonous snakes' on the list, and people somehow took it seriously"), and defended his right to publish it: "It's not hate speech or inciting violence against the Chinese race. It would be a dangerous precedent to come out and say, 'Sorry, we were totally out of our minds to print such a thing'." Many questioned Robinson's view of an appropriate reaction to racism. Nick Kelly, 2006 Students' Association president, posted an apology which called the article "xenophobic and inappropriate ... in poor taste".

=== 2008 nude "Hu Jintao" cover ===
In May 2008, Salient featured an article about the rise of China as a new world superpower. To publicise the article, that week's cover depicted a nude, unidentified, Salient staffer draped in a Chinese flag with Hu Jintao's face photoshopped on their own. The cover had a strong reaction from the Wellington Chinese community, with students removing the magazine from distribution at the university's Karori Campus. The Chinese Students' Association of Victoria University presented a petition with 133 signatures, calling for an apology. By July of that year, Salient had not apologised.

=== 2009 Lundy 500 ===
In July 2009, Salient editor Jackson Wood announced the "Lundy 500": an event in which "teams of vehicles ... [would] travel from Petone to Palmerston North as convicted double murderer Mark Lundy did in 2000, before murdering wife Christine and daughter Amber, according to the prosecution at his 2002 trial." Participants were tasked with making the trip in 68 minutes or less, the same time Lundy is said to have driven the distance. Wood said that the "event was designed to draw attention to some of the inconsistencies in the New Zealand legal system", and emphasised that he was not encouraging anyone to break the law. The proposed event was harshly criticised in the media, and on 2 August it was announced that it was cancelled. Wood apologised to the Lundy family: "He acknowledged that their viewpoints were not adequately taken into account before the event was announced on Friday, and that there were other ways for this point to be communicated".

A similar re-enactment of the travel involved in the Lundy case, the "Lundy Three Hundy", was proposed in 2013 by Nic Miller. It was also criticised in the media, with Mathew Grocott writing that "this event should not go ahead and if those involved have any human decency then it won't go ahead."

=== 2025 sexual-assault allegations ===
Massey University's Massive Magazine published a July 2025 exposé of 2025 editor Will Irvine, based on testimony from six current and former staff members. It alleges that in April of that year, Irvine sent a "manifesto" to his staff in which he admitted sexually assaulting a female when he was in high school; the staff then sent a joint email calling on him to resign. Irvine did not respond to the email, and told staff individually that he would not resign.

Four paid staff resigned, and a number of volunteer contributors withdrew from the publication. Other staff remained, but some were critical of Irvine for forcing them to choose between remaining in a work environment in which they felt unsafe and losing income. Irvine resigned on 15 July 2025, one day after the publication of Massive Magazine's exposé.

== ASPA Awards ==
Salient has participated in the ASPA Student Media Awards since they began in 2003. The magazine dominated the first two years of the awards, winning (amongst other categories) Best Publication in 2003 and 2004. Otago's Critic is generally seen as Salient's strongest competition and turned the tables in 2005, sweeping a number of categories (including Best Publication, with Salient finishing second). Critic received the Best Publication award again in 2006, with Salient placing second.

Salient received the 2009 Best Publication award, dominating that year's awards with five first places and eight other placings. The magazine also won best publication in 2011, but was runner-up to Critic in 2010, 2012 and 2013. In 2022, Salient received awards for Best Cover, Best Sports Writing, Best Personal Essay, Best Online Presence, Best Centrefold, Best Student Politics Coverage (tied) and Best Editorial (tied). Salient also received the Best Publication award in 2023 and 2026.

== See also ==
- List of print media in New Zealand
- List of student newspapers
