= Critic Te Ārohi =

University of Otago Students' Association magazine

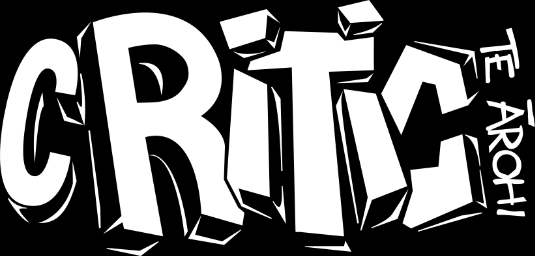
- Editor: Hanna Varrs
- Categories: Student Magazine
- Frequency: Weekly – 26 × yearly
- Circulation: 3,000 (20,000 readers)
- Publisher: Otago University Students Association
- Founded: 1925
- Company: Otago University Students' Association (OUSA)
- Country: New Zealand
- Based in: Dunedin, Otago
- Language: English
- Website: www.critic.co.nz
- ISSN: 0111-0365
- OCLC: 173348156

Critic Te Ārohi is the official magazine of the Otago University Students' Association (OUSA) of the University of Otago. It is freely available around both the University's campus, halls of residence and selected sites in Dunedin city weekly during semester time. Critic is New Zealand's longest-running student newspaper, having been established in 1925. Weekly circulation is 3,000 copies, with an estimated readership of approximately 20,000 including online readership.

== Content ==
Critic's content is primarily targeted towards its student demographic and is generally written through a student and rangatahi youth perspective. The magazine enjoys enduring popularity with its readership. The physical copies distributed on a weekly basis have a pick-up rate of 99% according to OUSA.

Critic's content includes recurring columns, news articles, long-form investigative journalism, profiles, reviews, puzzles and culture pieces that often examine or portray student life in Dunedin. The magazine is known for its humorous examination of provocative and taboo subject matter. Traditionally, Critic has had 'themed' issues including "The Sex Issue", "The Drugs Issue", "Te Reo Māori Issue", "The Food Issue", "The Census Issue" and more. However, recent years have seen a movement away from overtly stipulated themes. The majority of all Critic issues remain unthemed within the magazine's yearly cycle.

Although the scope of the content has varied year to year under different editorship, in recent years the magazine's coverage has remained local; focusing on stories of relevance to students and the surrounding Dunedin community. Since 2012, the magazine's mission statement has been to "reflect the reality of Otago University students back to themselves." In a 2018 profile of Critic, former Editor Joel MacManus told Stuff the magazine seeks to "cover stories other media can't or won't, in a way that they can't or won't [...] When we write something I know couldn't be published in the Otago Daily Times or on Stuff – that's when I'm like, 'This is great!' That's when it's Critic."

=== Critic Lite* ===
In 2025, the Student Media Manager, the incoming 2026 Co-Editors, and OUSA made the decision to change Critic’s print schedule to a fortnightly rotation of 36-page and 16-page issues. This change was driven by the need to reduce the magazine’s significant printing costs, while also trialling a new publishing and editorial approach. The revised model aimed to provide a smaller issue each fortnight, enabling the team to dedicate more time to researching and producing high-quality feature content for the bigger issues.

The first 16-page issue was released on 2 March 2026 and was met with significant public backlash from students and former editors. Critics of the change described the page reduction as abrupt and characterised it as an unreasonable political decision by OUSA, despite the change being publicised in an October 2025 issue of Critic. In response, a public petition emotively titled “Save Critic” was launched, and open letters were addressed to the OUSA Student Executive, calling for an immediate increase in Critic’s budget to reinstate a weekly 36-page format. These responses were made despite limited direct engagement with Critic on the rationale behind the decision.

Some commentators stated that the magazine was usually 48-60 pages every week. The decision was made by the 2025 editorial team and OUSA together, to reduce the page count to 36 each week for the second semester, as 48-pages of quality content was becoming hard for the team to manage weekly. No one at OUSA or Critic can recall the magazine being 60 page per week since at least the early 2000s before it moved to a magazine style format from a newsprint publication.

Despite the public reaction, OUSA and the Student Executive had already indicated its intention to consider a return to a consistent 36-page print schedule as part of its annual budget process for 2027, to be undertaken later in 2026. In the meantime, Critic released a public statement addressing key questions about the page reduction, which was shared across its website and social media platforms. Eventually the decision was made to change the page count in semester 2 to 32 pages per week.

=== High-profile stories ===
In 2018, Critic Te Ārohi reported that University of Otago Proctor Dave Scott had illegally entered two students flats without permission and confiscated bongs/water pipes, which were estimated to be worth over $700 combined. Critic's reporting received national media attention, resulting in a scandal the magazine labelled "BongShell." In a subsequent press conference, Scott confirmed the bongs had been destroyed and apologised for his actions.

In 2019, Critic published a story about a landlord breaching tenancy laws. After receiving a threatening letter in response, Critic made headlines for publishing the email on the cover of the following issue.

That same year, Critic published a exposé on the culture of misogyny in Knox College that normalised sexual misconduct against female students. The article included the testimonies of several female residents who had been sexually harassed or assaulted at the residential college between 2015 and 2017, many of whom claimed that the college's leadership ignored or dismissed their claims when they were reported to them. The article received national media attention. Although the feature was lauded for its investigative merit, Critic later issued an apology for not contacting Head Master Caroline Hepburn-Doole for comment before publication. With regards to the article's claim that instances of sexual assault and rape went "undisciplined," the magazine later accepted there was evidence "all complaints were documented and reported to others as appropriate."

In 2021, Critic published a series of articles detailing the findings of a six-month undercover investigation by Critic journalist Elliot Weir into Action Zealandia, a white supremacist organisation in New Zealand.

In 2023, Critic published a series of news articles reporting on hazing activity in Dunedin's student community. Critic's coverage, including a story on the abuse of a live eel, garnered national attention and was awarded 'Best News Story' at the Aotearoa Student Press Awards, with Judge Glenn McConnell commending the reporting for being of "national significance." The magazine's coverage later developed into a three-part series published in The Spinoff, authored by former Editor Fox Meyer.

=== Design ===
Critic began as a newspaper in 1925, before becoming a magazine in 2001. The publication was tabloid in size until 2002, when it went quarterfold (around A4 size). The design of Critic is often significantly changed each year as new designers are employed; typically recent graduates from the Otago Polytechnic Design School. Critic has a long-standing tradition of welcoming new designers by giving them the opportunity to create a fresh logo that reflects their personal style and vision for the magazine. The publication actively supports students from Otago Polytechnic’s Design School through design internships, offering valuable real-world experience in producing a weekly print magazine, and ensure the Polytechnic is included in the student and campus-life vibe of the magazine.

The design team includes several paid and volunteer “illustrators” though they are better described as multi-disciplinary artists. These contributors produce weekly covers, centerfolds, and accompanying artwork for articles, adding depth and personality to the publication. Altogether, visual design is a defining and essential element of Critic’s identity with posters of past covers being sold, and centrefold art adorning walls across North Dunedin.

In 2011, Critic's covers (under the magazine's Art Director Andrew Jacombs) were selected in the 2012 Coverjunkie "Best Of" Publication and exhibited alongside some of the world's most leading titles, including TIME, Esquire, The New Yorker, Vogue, Sports Illustrated and lift-outs from The New York Times and The Sunday Times.

== History ==
In 1925 Otago University medical student Francis Bennett, whom edited the annual student publication The Review, suggested a new student newspaper. OUSA approved. The Critic went on to replace the 4-page newsletter Te Korero, which Bennett later described as "a dismal rag which [Dan Aitken] and I usually filled up with imaginative froth a few hours before it went to press." Editor Douglas Archibald Campbell outlined the newspaper's ethos in the publication's first-ever editorial, envisioning Critic to be a publication where "criticism may be brought into the open" and would "suffer no word or deed to go unquestioned within the four walls of Otago University."

On 27 February 2025, the magazine marked its centennial anniversary with a book launch.

=== Controversies ===
The Office of Film and Literature Classification in 2005 banned an issue of the magazine, due to it containing a satirical "how-to-guide" on drug rape. The article was published in magazine's since-discontinued "offensive" themed issue, which ran from 2002—2005. Possession or distribution of this issue was deemed illegal. Editor Holly Walker stood by the decision to publish the article, stating it was "defendable" in that it highlighted "a very important issue and [would] hopefully make women more aware of what could happen to them." Walker later backtracked this statement in a comment to Critic in 2012, calling the article's publication a "mistake": "We were trying to be offensive for the sake of it, rather than with any greater purpose in mind [...] I wasn't a very woke feminist back then."

In 2010 The New Zealand Media Council upheld a complaint against Critic over the article 'The Bum at the Bottom of the World', which depicted three people the publication deemed homeless and vagrant. Editor Ben Thomson later stated the magazine "completely misjudged where the line was" and apologised for the article. The Press Council accepted Critic's apology as "sincere."

In 2013 Critic's Editor Callum Fredric received a $35,000 payout after a series of personal disputes with OUSA General Manager Darel Hall. Fredric was suspended by Hall on Friday 3 May, and was trespassed from OUSA buildings by Hall after attending a meeting on Monday 6 May to explain the situation to staff, before being asked to leave by Police. After filing legal proceedings, Fredric accepted a $35,000 settlement package from OUSA on Friday 17 May, and resigned as Editor.

In 2018, the cover of "The Menstruation Issue" featured a cartoon image of a woman menstruating. University of Otago Proctor Dave Scott took offence to the image and unilaterally decided to destroy all copies of the magazine. An open-letter signed by 17 former Editors expressed "deep concern" over the decision, with prominent New Zealand media figures accusing the university of "censorship." The removal of the magazines was further accused of stigmatising menstruation. The university later apologised, calling the decision a "mistake".

In 2020 Critic criticised Otago University's response to the Covid-19 pandemic in an opinion piece, leading the university's refusal to answer media requests from Critic and threatening to pull advertising from the magazine. Following changes in University of Otago media staff, the University has resumed accepting media requests and running advertisements.

== Awards and nominations ==
Critic Te Ārohi is a member of the Aotearoa Student Press Association (ASPA) and has been awarded Best Publication in the annual ASPA awards in 2005, 2006, 2008, 2010, 2012, 2013, 2014, 2017, 2018, 2019, 2020, 2021 and 2025.

Aotearoa Student Press Awards
Year	Awards Won	Runner up	Judge's Commentary
2025	Best Publication, Best Editorial, Best Humour/Satire, Best Centrefold, Best Design, Best Illustration, Best News Coverage, Best Feature, Best Feature Writer	Best Sports Coverage, Best Science Journalism, Best Māori Coverage, Best Design, Best Photographer, Best Reporter	“Just utterly exceptional work.” - Paula Penfold in judging the Best Publication category.
2024	Best Editorial, Best Feature Writer, Best Reporter, Best Culture Writer, Best Investigation, Best Reviews, Best Sports Coverage and Best Social Media Presence.	Best Publication, Best Design, Best Feature, Best Profile, Best Column, Best Creative Writing, Best Science Communication, Best Māori Coverage, Best Cover, Best Centrefold.	No commentary was provided for the runner-up for Best Publication in 2024. However, across other categories, Critic Te Ārohi was highly praised for its design, illustration, and editorial content. Judges highlighted its "cool," "raw," and "gritty" aesthetic, with covers and centrefolds lauded for capturing the university experience with subversive charm and authenticity. Critic’s editorial work was described as nuanced and incisive, with standout pieces addressing complex topics with thoughtfulness and originality.
2023	Best Editorial, Best Feature Writer, Best Feature, Best News Story, Best Culture Writer, Best Photographer, Best Opinion Writer, Best Headline, Best Humour/Satire, Best Sports Coverage, Best Science Journalism and Best Column.	Best Publication, Best Māori Coverage, Best Reviewer, Best Cover, Best Centrefold, Best Illustrator and Best Illustration.	Judges Madeleine Chapman and Toby Manhire commended Critic Te Ārohi as an "outstanding student publication," noting there was little to separate it from Best Publication winner Salient. The magazine was commended for being "bursting with good ideas" and high quality execution across news section, features section and illustration in particular. Critic was praised for having a "clear and compelling personality" of which readers "would walk a mile in the rain to snag a copy [of]."
2022	Best Feature, Best Humour/Satire, Best Column, Best Photographer, Best Headline, Best Opinion Writer, Best Culture/Lifestyle, Best News Story.	Best Publication, Sports Writing, Best Poetry, Best Māori coverage.	
2021	Best Publication, Best Website, Best News Story, Best News Reporter, Best Feature Writer, Best Sports Reporter, Best Opinion Writer, and Best Editorial.	Best Feature, Best Culture/Lifestyle Writer, Best Headline, Best Creative Writing Fiction or Poetry.	
2020	Best Publication, Best COVID-19 Coverage, Best Design, Best Humour/Satire, Best Column, Best News Story, Best Photographer, Best Editorial, Best News Reporter.		
2019	Best Publication, Best Feature Article, Best Humour/Satire, Best Photography, Best Editorial, Best News Reporter, Best Reviewer.		
2018	Best Publication, Best Feature Writer, Best Student Politics Reporter, Best Opinion Writer, Best Feature Article, Best Design, Best Original Illustration, Best News Reporter, Best Headline, Best Editorial Writer.		
2017	Best Publication, Best Feature Writer, Best News Writer, Best Headline, Best Sports Writer.		
2016			
2015			
2014	Best Publication, Best Feature, Best Design, Best Feature Writer, Lifestyle Section, Best Original Illustration.		
2013			
2012	Best Publication, Best Editorial, Best Series and Best Website.		
2011	Best Education Series, Best News Writer, Best Feature Writer and Best Feature.	Best Publication.	
2010	Best Publication, Best Editorial Writer, Best Paid News Reporter, Best Illustrator, Best Education Series.		Critic received the highest possible score from all judges and was praised for being "The only magazine this year that didn't just ask the audience to notice how smart it was; instead, it went out and proved it by doing smart, creative, interesting things."
2009			
2008	Best Publication.		
2007		Best Publication.	
2006	Best Publication.		
2005	Best Publication.		
2004		Best Publication.	

== Editorship ==
The Critic Te Ārohi editor-in-chief is an employee of OUSA. The Editor is appointed and employed full time under either a permanent or a fixed term contract that covers roughly the beginning to end of Otago University's academic year (February-October). Previous involvement with the magazine is not a prerequisite for applicants, although most have held a sub-editorial position at Critic prior to being appointed editor. Although Critic's editorship has been shared in previous years (particularly in the magazine's early history), in modern times the role of editor is typically fulfilled by one person. At the beginning of 2026, the magazine was led by two Co-Editors, both full-time students, who each worked approximately 20 hours per week. Due to increasing study commitments, one Co-Editor transitioned to the role of Deputy Editor and later assumed the position of News Editor. In June 2026, the then News Editor moved into the Deputy Editor role. Usually the Editor is a full time (40 hours per week) position that is undertaken by someone that has just graduated. The typical tenure for Critic Editor is one year, though roughly 10% of editors in Critic's history have stayed on for two years as of 2024.

Notable past editors include journalist and Rhodes Scholar Sir Geoffrey Cox, Priest and human rights activist Paul Oestreicher (OBE), renowned obstetrician Diana Mason (OBE), TV broadcaster Jim Mora, political commentator Chris Trotter, New Zealand Alliance Party co-leader Victor Billot, Substack co-founder Hamish McKenzie and Rhodes Scholar and former Green Party MP Holly Walker.

=== List of Critic Te Ārohi editors ===
Year	Editor
1925	Douglas Archibald Campbell
1926	co. W. G. McClymont and C. A. Sharp
1927	co. J. A. Stallworthy and M. W. Wilson
1928	co. A. M. Douglas and G. L. McLeod
1929	co. I. G. Gordon and J. C. Dakin
1930	co. Geoffrey Cox and G. C. Macdiarmid
1931	co. G. C. Macdiarmid and E. Stephenson
1932	H. A. Small (first half) and G. L. McLeod (second half)
1933	[Frank W. Guest]
1934	Frank W. Guest (first half) and [Ralph George Park] (second half)
1935	E. M. Elder
1936	C. P. Powles (first half) and P. M. Lusk (second half)
1937	Lloyd Woods
1938	W. R. Geddles (first half) and co. W. R. Geddles and P. M. Lusk (second half)
1939	N. V. Farrell
1940	B. H. R. Hill
1941	D. L. Matheson (first half) and N. F. Gilkison (second half)
1942	[Diana M. Shaw]
1943	Ronald Taylor (first half) and J. C. D. Sutherland (second half)
1944	[W. D. Trotter]
1945	co. Stephanie Wylie and Sheila Wilding (first half) and Stephanie Wylie (second half)
1946	co. Joyce Richards and Valarie Seymour
1947	co. [Thomas Guy Hawley] and Suzette Hawley
1948	Eric Hill
1949	Deirdre Airey
1950	C. I. Patterson
1951	M . E. D. Webster (first half) and co. Colin Newbury and Nigel Eastgate (second half)
1952	Paul Oestreicher
1953	John Irwin
1954	co. Howard Clay and Geoff Adams (first half) and co. Howard Clay and John Stewart (second half)
1955	Paul Thompson
1956	Earle Wilson
1957	Dennis Lenihan
1958	Fraser Harbutt (second half only)
1959	Fraser Harbutt (first half) and Allan Bruce (second half)
1960	Allan Bruce (first half) and Peter Matheson (second half)
1961	John Harris
1962	Andrew Brown
1963	co. Mel Dickson and Al Forrest
1964	Don F. Gray
1965	co. Roger Strong and Warren Mayne
1966	Don F. Gray
1967	Charles Draper
1968	Charles Draper (first half) and [Bob Dey] (second half)
1969	Mike Meek
1970	Peter Dickson
1971	John Robson
1972	Hugh Maclean
1973	co. David Payton and John Keir
1974	Jim Mora
1975	Andrew Webb
1976	Bronwyn Evans
1977	Al Duncan
1978	Belinda Carter
1979	Belinda Carter
1980	Simon Kilroy
1981	Chris Trotter
1982	Reid Perkins
1983	Roy Ward
1984	Andrew Johnston
1985	alternating Niels Reinsborg and Lydia Mabbett
1986	co. for first half and then alternating Alexandra Tylee, Sam Elworthy, Grant Ramsey, Shelley Cooper, Andrew Vincent
1987	co. Gill Plimmer, Hannah Zwartz, and Fiona Morris
1988	Michael Tull
1989	co. Nickee Charteris and Astrid Smeele
1990	Emma Reid
1991	Colin Peacock
1992	Caroline McCaw
1993	Colin Williscroft
1994	Louise Johnstone
1995	co. Victor Billot and Paul Dagarin
1996	co. Leah McFall and Tracy Huirama-Osborne (first half) and Tracy Huirama-Osborne (second half)
1997	co. Logan Sisley and Gavin Bertram
1998	co. Brent McIntyre and Gavin Bertram
1999	Brent McIntyre
2000	Fiona Bowker
2001	Fiona Bowker
2002	Patrick Crewdson]
2003	[Patrick Crewdson]
2004	Hamish McKenzie
2005	Holly Walker
2006	John Ong
2007	David Large
2008	David Large
2009	Amy Joseph
2010	Ben Thomson
2011	Julia Hollingsworth
2012	Joe Stockman
2013	Callum Fredric (February–May) and Sam McChesney (May–October)
2014	Zane Pocock
2015	Josie Cochrane
2016	Hugh Baird
2017	Lucy Hunter
2018	Joel MacManus
2019	Charlie O'Mannin
2020	Sinead Gill
2021	Erin Gourley
2022	Fox Meyer
2023	Fox Meyer
2024	Nina Brown
2025	Nina Brown
2026	Hanna Varrs (and co. Gryffin Blockley for sem 1)

== Sub-editorship ==
Critic's sub-editorial roles are Designer, Sub-Editor, News Editor, Features Editor and Culture Editor. Designer is the second most senior role within Critic as the only staff member (aside from Editor) that is employed full-time.

At the beginning of 2026, the magazine was led by two Co-Editors, both full-time students, who each worked approximately 20 hours per week. Due to increasing study commitments, one Co-Editor transitioned to the newly created support role of Deputy Editor and later assumed the position of News Editor. In June 2026, the then News Editor moved into the Deputy Editor role.

In 2023 the role of Ētita Māori (Māori Editor) was made a permanent position. The role entails the production of Māori interest content and the magazine's annual te reo Māori themed issue.

Until 2018, there were rotating 'Section Editors' (now described as staff writers) covering books, art, film, games, poetry food, music, politics and sport. In some years, "Deputy Editor" "Technical Editor" and "Art Director" have been listed as sub-editorial roles. Notable staff members and contributors to Critic have included poet James K Baxter and cricketer and caricaturist Murray Webb.

=== List of Critic Te Ārohi sub-editors ===
Year	Design editor	Sub-editor	News editor	Features editor	Culture editor	Ētita Māori
2011	Andrew Jacombs	Lisa McGonigle	Gregor Whyte	Role Not Listed	Role Not Listed	
2012	Andrew Jacombs	Sam McChesney	Charlotte Greenfield	Role Not Listed	Role Not Listed	
2013	Sam Clark	Sarah MacIndoe	Role Not Listed	Role Not Listed	Role Not Listed	
2014	Sam Clark	Max Prestige	Josie Cochrane	Loulou Callister-Baker	Role Not Listed	
2015	Kat Gilbertson	Mary McLaughlin	Laura Munro	Laura Starling	Loulou Callister-Baker	
2016	Natasha Murachver	Laura Starling	Joe Higham	Role Not Listed	Role Not Listed	
2017	Natasha Murachver	Charlie O'Mannin	Joe Higham	Role Not Listed	Role Not Listed	
2018	Jack Adank	Nat Moore	Charlie O'Mannin	Chelle Fitzgerald	Jess Thompson	
2019	Jack Adank	Nat Moore	Esme Hall	Chelle Fitzgerald	Henessey Griffiths	
2020	Molly Willis	Jamie Mactaggart	Erin Gourley	Role Not Listed	Caroline Moratti	
2021	Molly Willis	Oscar Francis	Fox Meyer	Elliot Weir	Annabelle Parata Vaughan	
2022	Molly Willis	Maddie Fenn	Denzel Chung	Elliot Weir	Annabelle Parata Vaughan	
2023	Molly Willis	Nina Brown	Nina Brown	Elliot Weir	Annabelle Parata Vaughan	Heeni "Sky" Koero Te Rerenoa (Ngāti Hine, Ngāti Wai, Te Rarawa)
2024	Evie Noad	Ellie Bennett	Hugh Askerud	Iris Hehir	Charlotte "Lotto" Ramsay	Heeni "Sky" Koero Te Rerenoa (Ngāti Hine, Ngāti Wai, Te Rarawa)
2025	Evie Noad	Ellie Bennett	Hanna Varrs Gryffin Blockley	Iris Hehir Hanna Varrs	Jordan Irvine Charlotte "Lotto" Ramsay	Heeni "Sky" Koero Te Rerenoa (Ngāti Hine, Ngāti Wai, Te Rarawa)
2026	Ash McFarlane Stella Caulton	-	Stella Weston	Tilly Rumball-Smith	Molly Smith-Soppet	Heeni "Sky" Koero Te Rerenoa (Ngāti Hine, Ngāti Wai, Te Rarawa)
2026	Deputy Editor: Gryffin Blockley (April-June) Stella Weston (June-November)					

== Other Staffing ==
In 2024, a Student Media Manager role was established within OUSA to mentor, provide strategic oversight, operational support, and resources so the Critic team can focus on producing the publication. The role also provides support to Radio One. This department manager position sits within the organisation’s senior leadership team. The creation of the role has elevated the profile of Critic within OUSA and the wider community, while also ensuring the provision of crucial wellbeing support to the team, particularly under often stressful circumstances. It has also reduced the financial and employment responsibilities previously held by the editorial team.

Traditionally, Critic relied heavily on volunteer staff, with very few paid employees. However, over the past 10-15 years, this trend has shifted as students have had less capacity to volunteer due to the increasing need to prioritise paid work. In response, OUSA has expanded paid opportunities for students.

Alongside the Editor, Designer, and Sub-Editor roles, paid positions now include:

- Staff Writer
- Senior News Reporter
- Illustrator
- Photographer

In 2026, Critic/OUSA introduced two new roles, a Video Editor and a Social Media Manager, for the first time. These positions reflect the growing need to produce more online content for both the publication and advertisers seeking stronger digital and social media presence. Additionally, in the first semester of 2026, a paid New Zealand Music Commission Music Journalism Intern was hosted, splitting their time between Critic and Radio One.

The 2026 paid team comprises 23 employees, each working between 4 and 20 hours per week, totalling approximately 185 paid hours across the team weekly.

Despite this shift toward a larger paid workforce, Critic continues to welcome and regularly publish contributions from volunteers. A dedicated Facebook page is maintained for prospective contributors to connect and submit written and visual work.
