= Auckland University Students' Association =

- Motto: Serving Students
- Institution: University of Auckland
- Location: Auckland, New Zealand
- Established: 24 June 1891; 135 years ago (as Auckland University College Students’ Association)
- President: Nimish Milan Singh
- Members: c. 27,000 total
- Affiliations: New Zealand University Games
- Subsidiaries: Craccum; 95bFM; Shadows Bar
- Website: www.ausa.org.nz

The Auckland University Students' Association (Māori: Te Rōpū Kahikatea), also known as AUSA, represents students at the University of Auckland. Founded in 1891, AUSA organises student events, publicises student issues, administers student facilities, and assists affiliated student clubs and societies. It also produces Craccum magazine and runs the bFM radio station.

The constitution of the AUSA centres the organisation around student advocacy and the provision of welfare services. AUSA has 27,000 members out of 42,000 equivalent full-time students enrolled at the University of Auckland.

== Structure ==
=== AUSA executive ===
This is the incumbent AUSA executive team for 2026. Note that the Māori and Pacific Island Student Officers are elected separately from the rest of the Executive by Ngā Tauira Māori and the Auckland University Pacific Island Students Association (AUPISA) respectively.

AUSA does not hold elections for the position of Association Secretary, but the Executive has the power to appoint an officer or member of staff to the role. This position is usually held by the Association General Manager or CEO by default.

Executive Position	2026 Officeholder
President	Nimish Milan Singh
Education Vice-President (UG)	Matthew Lee
Education Vice-President (PG)	Eugene Lee
Finance and Operations Vice-President	Praneel Gupta
Engagement Vice-President	Rachana Rajeev
Wellbeing and Equity Vice-President	Nadia Malik
International Students' Officer	Gauri Jeejesh
Post-Graduate Officer	Chelsea Prince
Queer Rights Officer	Artie Ho
Women’s Rights Officer	Ayesha Mohammed
Disability Rights Officer	Ayolabi Martins
Māori Students’ Officers	Rhiannon Kapa
Pacific Island Students’ Officer	Tschan Hagai

=== Senior Leadership Team (SLT) ===
- President
- Finance and Operations Vice-President (Formerly Treasurer-Secretary)
- Education Vice-President (Undergraduate)
- Education Vice-President (Postgraduate)
- Engagement Vice-President
- Wellbeing and Equity Vice-President

=== Portfolios ===
- International Students' Officer
- Women's Rights Officer
- Queer Rights Officer
- Postgraduate Students' Officer
- Disability Rights' Officer
- Pacific Island Students' Officer
- Māori Students' Officers
- after an Executive election, the President-Elect.

=== Past presidents ===
Past AUSA presidents
- 2025 Gabriel Boyd
- 2024 Alan Shaker
- 2023 Alan Shaker
- 2022 Alofa So’olefai
- 2021 Anamika Harirajh
- 2020 George Barton / Emma Rogers
- 2019 Anand Rama / George Barton
- 2018 Anna Cusack
- 2017 Will Matthews
- 2016 Will Matthews
- 2015 Paul Smith
- 2014 Cate Bell
- 2013 Dan Haines
- 2012 Arena Williams
- 2011 Joe McCrory
- 2010 Elliott Blade
- 2009 Darcy Peacock
- 2008 David Do
- 2007 Lesieli Oliver
- 2006 Dan Bidois
- 2005 Greg Langton
- 2004 Kate Sutton
- 2003 Scott Kelly
- 2002 Ross Burns
- 2001 Kane Stanford
- 2000 Kane Stanford
- 1999 Efeso Collins
- 1998 Mark O'Brien
- 1997 Phillip Stevens
- 1996 Phillip Stevens
- 1995 Brendon Lane
- 1994 Cyrus Richardson
- 1993 Richard Watson
- 1992 Douglas Sadlier
- 1991 Douglas Sadlier
- 1990 Ella Henry
- 1989 Des Amanano
- 1988 Richard Foster
- 1987 Graham Watson
- 1986 Graham Watson
- 1985 Graham Watson
- 1984 Trish Mullins
- 1983 John Broad / Jonathan Blakeman
- 1982 David Kirkpatrick
- 1981 Wayne McIntosh
- 1980 Kevin Hague
- 1979 Janet Roth
- 1978 Mervyn Prince
- 1977 Bruce Gulley
- 1975/76 Michael Walker
- 1974/75 Clare Ward
- 1973/74 Ed Hayson
- 1972 Russell Bartlett
- 1971 John Woodroffe
- 1970/71 William Spring
- 1969/70 Michael G. Law
- 1968/69 W. B. Rudman
- 1967/68 J. Prebble
- 1966/67 R. G. Wood
- 1965/66 R. S. M. Mountain
- 1964/65 A. M. Katavich
- 1963/64 H. M. Romaniuk
- 1962/63 P. J. Rankin
- 1961/62 W. J. Strevens
- 1959/60 O. J. Miller
- 1958/59 A. W. Young
- 1957/58 P. J. Gordon
- 1956/57 P. W. Boag
- 1955/56 P. W. Boag
- 1953 Frances D. Spence
- 1953/54 Frances D. Spence
- 1949/50 M. S. Brittain
- 1949 P. F. Robinson
- 1947/48 J. A. Nathan
- 1947 J. A. Nathan
- 1946 K. L. Piper
- 1945 K. L. Piper
- 1943/44 J. E. Blennerhassett
- 1943 D. J. Morrell
- 1941 M. W. Speight
- 1940 D. T. Clouston
- 1939 J. C. Reid
- 1938 J. C. Reid
- 1937 A. P. Blair
- 1936 J. D. Lewis
- 1935 E. P. Haslam
- 1934 E. P. Haslam
- 1933 M. G. Sullivan
- 1931/32 M. G. Sullivan
- 1931 J. N. Wilson
- 1930 J. N. Wilson
- 1929 A. K. Turner
- 1928 A. Thompson
- 1925 A. J. Gray / S. F. Meikeljohn
- 1924 G. H. Munro
- 1923 C. R. McCullough
- 1922 W. A. E. Leonard
- 1921 H. W. Shove
- 1920 S. E. Senior
- 1919 C. Smith
- 1918 E. H. R. Green
- 1917 V. R. Browne
- 1915 F. T. Cox
- 1914 F. A. Airey
- 1913 J. Reynolds
- 1912 F. A. Taylor
- 1908 W. G. Aldridge
- 1907 S. N. Ziman
- 1906 E. de C. Clarke
- 1905 L. T. Pickmere
- 1904 F. Sinclaire
- 1903 G. B. Stephenson
- 1902 F. C. Long
- 1900 H. D. Bamford
- 1899 A. J. D. Mahon
- 1894 F. E. Baume

== AUSA House ==
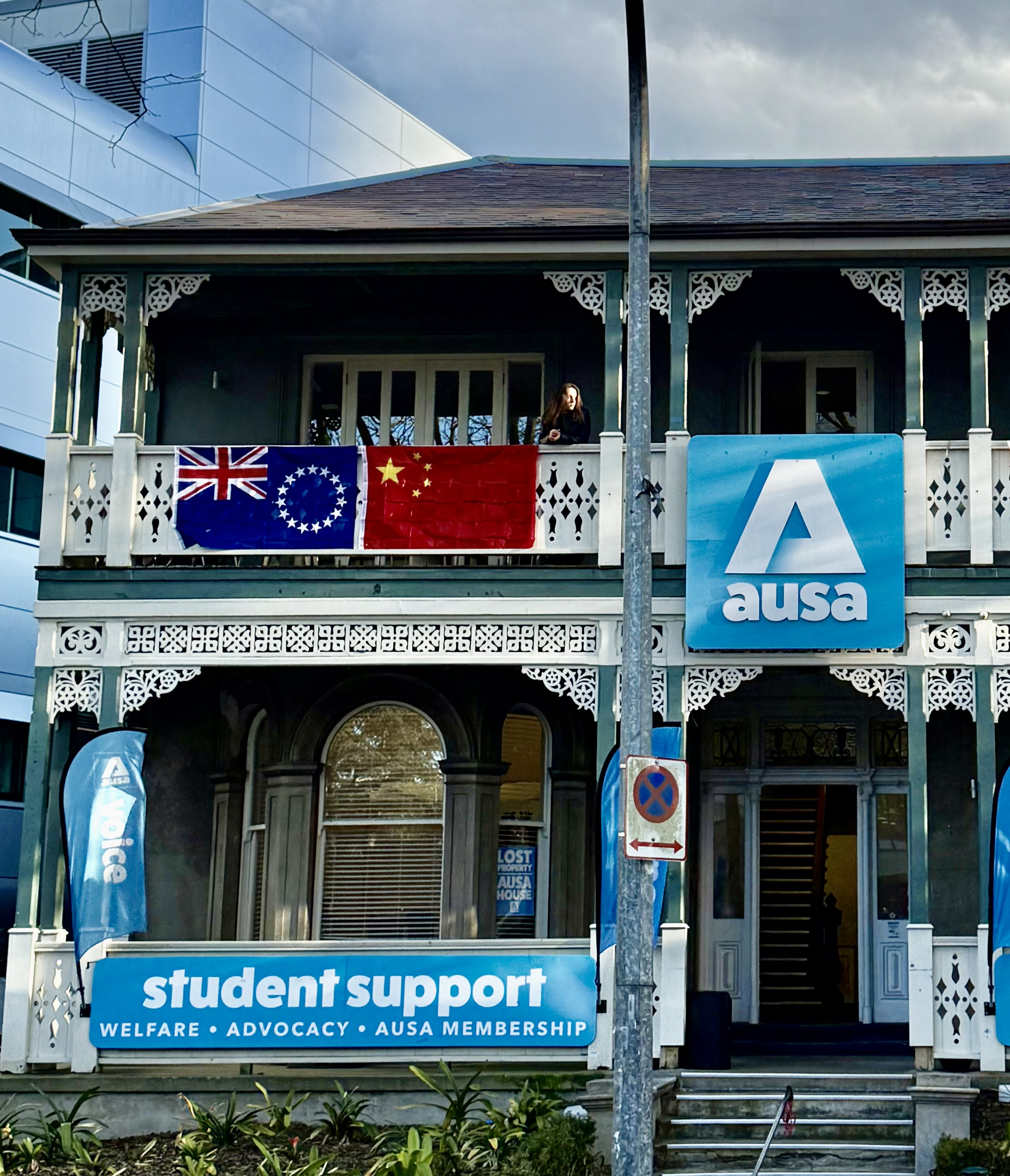
AUSA House at 4 Alfred Street

AUSA is headquartered at 4 Alfred Street, Auckland Central. The association own the property and as of 1995, the building is listed as a Historic Place Category 2 with Heritage New Zealand. An annual music festival is held outside AUSA called Alfred Street Festival.

AUSA also own a property portfolio and generate revenue from it.

== Membership ==
AUSA membership is free to all current students of the University of Auckland. As required by legislation, the University Council conducted a student referendum in 1999 on whether membership in AUSA should be voluntary or compulsory. The majority of students supported voluntary membership and this was enacted. Referendums on the same issue were held in 2001 and 2003, and in each case, the majority of students voted for voluntary association.

Detractors of voluntary student membership (VSM) say that AUSA suffers drastically from it, and that VSM undermines AUSA's ability to advocate on behalf of students and provide welfare services. They also say that in controlling the flow of money, the university dictates the terms to some extent of its operations through various agreements. As early as the mid-nineties, a number of incidents decreased AUSA's credibility and alienated a lot of members who were previously disinterested in student politics, and were an undeniable factor in the 1999 referendum. Contentious issues like allocation of funds was the focus of many debates at the Quad.

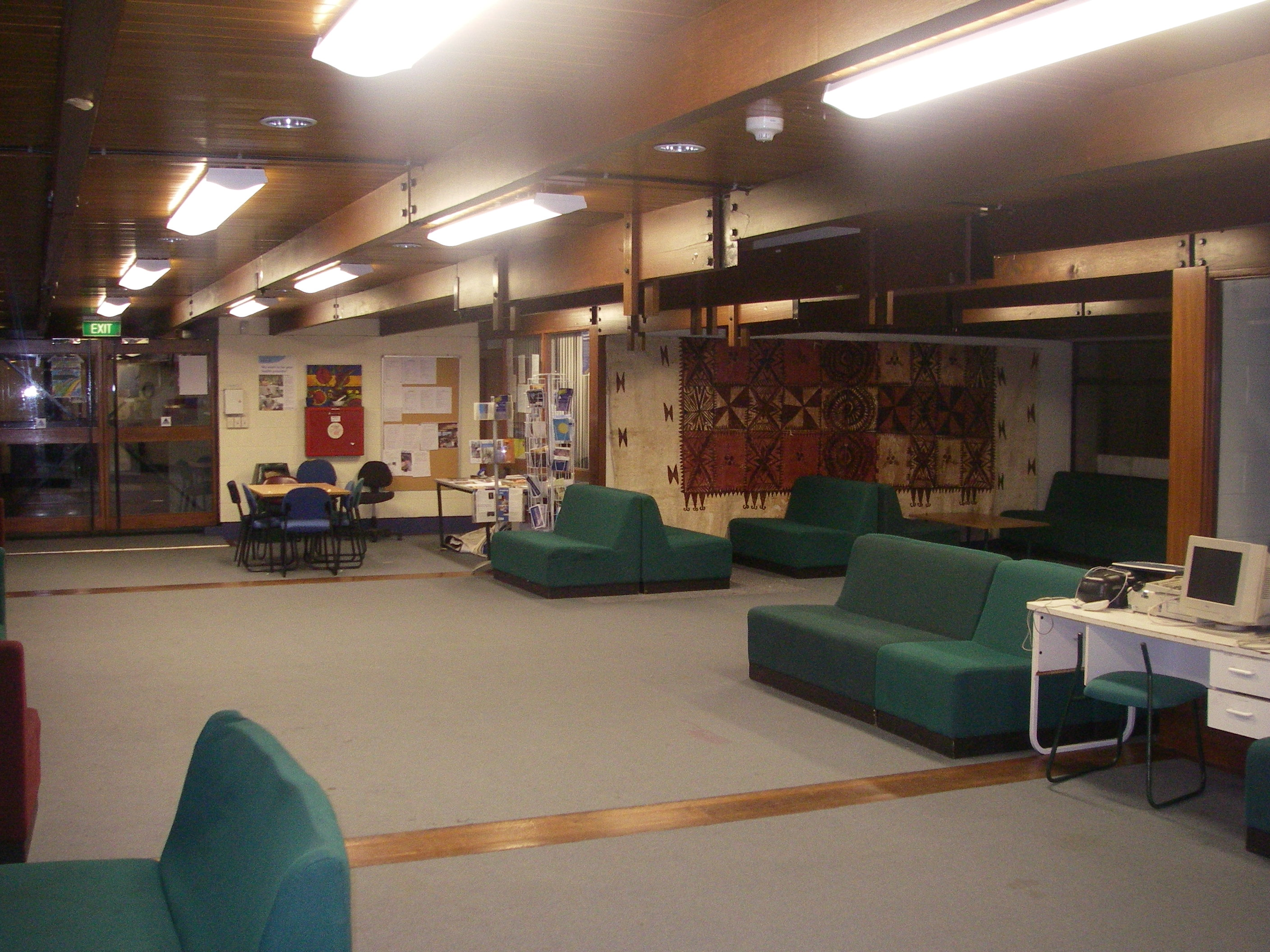
Lagi Atea Moana Cultural Space in the AUSA Student Union Buildings

Proponents of VSM, on the other hand, claim VSM means freedom of choice for students. They cite the United Nations declaration of freedom of association. They also paint AUSA executives under compulsory unionism as being wasteful, and believe that under voluntary AUSA executives are forced to be more accountable to members. They claim that the level of intervention is very limited (for example, the conditions are only that AUSA must run orientation and the like).

== Craccum ==
Craccum is a magazine produced by the AUSA since 1927. The name originated from the scrambled acronym of "Auckland University College Men's Common Room Circular".

As a student publication, the magazine has tackled controversial topics at times. Notable examples include instructions for making a nuclear bomb, and an article that discussed different methods to commit suicide.

Until 2020, the Editor-in-chief of Craccum was an elected position but is now appointed by the AUSA's Craccum Administrative Board. From 1970 to 2024, the magazine released weekly print issues but now releases monthly after budget cuts.

== 95bFM ==
95bFM (or simply bFM) is a typical student radio station that plays alternative music. Like other student broadcasters, it supports local artists well before they become mainstream.

Originally started as Radio Bosom, a capping stunt, bFM has gone a long way. Today, with voluntary student union membership, bFM is pushed to make a profit for the Association, and exists more as a corporate entity than a student radio station.

== Shadows Bar ==
Shadows Bar is a student bar owned and operated by AUSA. It is located in the University of Auckland's city campus.

== UBIQ bookshop ==
UBIQ (previously UBS) was a bookshop owned and operated by AUSA from 1966. On August 31, 2025, UBIQ was permanently closed down following financial liquidation.
