= Aotearoa Student Press Association =

The Aotearoa Student Press Association is an association of seven student newspapers and magazines that are published by the student associations of universities and polytechnics in Aotearoa (New Zealand). The Aotearoa Student Press Association has an associate membership in the New Zealand House of Representatives press gallery.

== Membership ==
Members of the Aotearoa Student Press Association are:

- Critic Te Ārohi, University of Otago
- Canta, University of Canterbury
- Craccum, University of Auckland
- Debate, Auckland University of Technology
- Massive, Massey University (Wellington, Albany and Manawatu campuses)
- Nexus, University of Waikato
- Salient, Victoria University of Wellington
- The Canterbury Memo, University of Canterbury

Magazines that are no longer part of the Aotearoa Student Press Association include:

- Ram, Lincoln University
- Crew, Universal College of Learning
- Decoy, Eastern Institute of Technology
- Gyro, Otago Polytechnic
- In Unison, Unitec
- Te Pararē, Te Mana Ākonga

== History ==
The Aotearoa Student Press Association (ASPA) was established in November 1991 to support student journalism in New Zealand, following the disbandment of the New Zealand Student Arts Council (NZSAC). Recognising the need to continue the training, funding, and organisational support previously provided by NZSAC, ASPA was founded as a collective effort to ensure the survival and development of student media across the country. On 4 February 1994, ASPA formalised its operations by becoming an incorporated society, further solidifying its role as a key institution in student journalism.

ASPA’s first major initiative was the organisation of annual training conferences, beginning in 1992, to provide student editors and staff with practical skills in areas such as editorial management, advertising, and ethical journalism. These conferences aimed to ensure a consistent transfer of knowledge between successive generations of student journalists. That same year, ASPA launched ASPAration, an advertising service that connected student newspapers with advertisers, creating a sustainable revenue stream for publications with limited funding.

On 1 August 1992, ASPA members worked to establish a national employment contract for student journalists, aimed at protecting them from the transient nature of their roles. Around this time, the organisation also adopted a "Statement of Principles" to guide ethical reporting and reinforce editorial independence, a response to the precarious balance between maintaining freedom of the press and meeting the demands of funding bodies like student associations.

Despite these advancements, ASPA faced financial challenges from its inception. The loss of NZSAC’s funding forced ASPA to rely on contributions from individual student associations, whose priorities often conflicted with supporting collective initiatives. The introduction of user-pays systems in the 1990s further exacerbated these difficulties. To address these challenges, ASPA created collaborative networks among student newspapers, enabling resource sharing and joint training opportunities. In 1993, ASPA transitioned into a charitable trust, a move designed to reduce administrative burdens while maintaining its focus on training and advocacy for student media.

In 1993, ASPA introduced the ASPA Awards to recognise excellence in student journalism. The awards celebrated achievements in categories such as news reporting, feature writing, and reviews, and provided constructive feedback from professional judges. Over the years, the awards became a hallmark of ASPA’s efforts to uphold high standards in student journalism.

== Awards ==
The association has held an annual awards ceremony since 2002, recognising the best in New Zealand's student media; past sponsors have included the New Zealand Listener and Fairfax Media Group. Prizes regularly include subscriptions and an internship with the sponsor. The awards are judged by a collection of New Zealand media experts and commentators - previous judges have included Chris Knox, Nicky Hager, Raybon Kan, and John Campbell.

== Best Publication Winners ==
Year	Winner	Judge	Commentary
2026	Salient		
2025	Critic Te Ārohi	Paula Penfold	“Just utterly exceptional work.” In 2025 Critic also won: Best Editorial, Best Humour/Satire, Best Centrefold, Best Design, Best Illustration, Best News Coverage, Best Feature, Best Feature Writer
2024	Massive	Madeleine Chapman	Chapman described Massive’s submission as "exceptionally strong," with all three sample issues featuring exclusive news stories that were highly relevant to Massey students. The reporting, particularly on scandals and disruptions within the student association, was praised for adhering to standard journalism practice, including interviewing involved parties, questioning those accused of misconduct, and providing regular updates as stories developed. Chapman noted that Massive "packed a punch" despite being the smallest magazine in terms of pages per issue; commending the "deeply passionate" team of writers, editors, designers, and illustrators for their work on a "much smaller than average budget ... [proving] that the best magazines are always greater than the sum of their parts."
2023	Salient	Madeleine Chapman, Toby Manhire & ASPA Panel	The judges praised winner Salient for its "exceptional" coverage of campus news and election candidate interviews, specifically highlighting its innovative integration of podcasts that allowed readers to explore full interviews after reading the write-ups. They commended Salient for its consistency and "curatorial vision," noting that each issue felt complete and considered, making it a "very worthy winner."
2022	Craccum		
2021	Critic Te Ārohi		
2020	Critic Te Ārohi		
2019	Critic Te Ārohi		
2018	Critic Te Ārohi		
2017	Critic Te Ārohi		
2016			
2015			
2014	Critic Te Ārohi		
2013	Critic Te Ārohi		
2012	Critic Te Ārohi		
2011	Salient		
2010	Critic Te Ārohi		
2009	Salient		
2008	Critic Te Ārohi		
2007	Craccum		
2006	Critic Te Ārohi		
2005	Critic Te Ārohi		
2004	Salient		

Best Small Publication

2013 - Canta

2012 - Canta, Nexus (2nd)

2009 - Magneto, Gyro (2nd), InUnison (3rd)

2007 - Magneto, In Unison (2nd), Satellite (3rd)

2006 - Magneto, Satellite (2nd), In Unison (3rd)

2005 - Debate, Magneto (2nd), Satellite & In Unison (3rd equal)
