= New Zealand University Games =

Multi-sport competition

- Status: active
- Genre: sporting event
- Date: March–April
- Frequency: annual
- Location: various
- Inaugurated: 1902
- Organiser: USNZ

The New Zealand University Games is a multi-sport competition held annually in each March / April between teams fielded from a large number of New Zealand Universities and tertiary institutions. It was formerly known as the Easter Tournament.

The first University Games was held in 1902 with 3 sports being contested - Tennis, Athletics and Debating. The games are run by University Sport New Zealand (USNZ), working closely with its member Students’ Associations and national sporting organisations; USNZ operates national, regional and international inter-university sporting competitions. The Games is the flagship event on the university sporting calendar and attracts 2200 participants in more than 30 sports and is one of the largest annual multi-sport events in New Zealand.

== The Shield ==
The Shield is awarded to the Games Overall University Champion and was first awarded in 1923. The shield shows the sporting prowess of the Universities in New Zealand and the ongoing challenge to be the best. Otago University has been dominant in the past games winning the shield an impressive 35 times, with the next closest challenger Auckland and Canterbury Universities winning 13 times a piece.

== Competing Institutes ==
- University of Auckland
- Auckland University of Technology
- Massey University - Albany
- University of Waikato
- Massey University - Palmerston North
- Victoria University of Wellington
- Massey University - Wellington
- University of Canterbury
- Lincoln University
- University of Otago
- Southern Institute of Technology (2010)
- Eastern Institute of Technology

== Winners of the New Zealand University Games ==
- 1902-22 No overall award
- 1923 Otago
- 1924 Otago
- 1925 Canterbury
- 1926 Auckland
- 1927 Auckland
- 1928 Victoria
- 1929 Auckland
- 1930 Auckland
- 1932 Canterbury
- 1933 Canterbury
- 1934 Canterbury
- 1935 Canterbury
- 1936 Canterbury
- 1937 no tournament
- 1938 Victoria
- 1939 Otago
- 1940 Auckland
- 1941 Otago
- 1942 no tournament
- 1943 no tournament
- 1944 no tournament
- 1945 Canterbury
- 1946 Otago
- 1947 Auckland
- 1948 Canterbury
- 1949 Otago
- 1950 Otago
- 1951 Auckland
- 1952 Otago
- 1953 Otago
- 1954 Otago
- 1955 Otago
- 1956 Otago
- 1957 Otago
- 1958 Otago
- 1959 No tournament
- 1960 Canterbury
- 1961 Otago
- 1962 Auckland
- 1963 Otago
- 1964 Otago
- 1965 Otago
- 1966 Otago
- 1967 Otago
- 1968 Otago
- 1969 no engraving
- 1970 Otago
- 1971 Otago
- 1972 no tournament
- 1973 no tournament
- 1974 Otago
- 1975 Otago
- 1976 Otago
- 1977 Victoria
- 1978 Canterbury
- 1979 Auckland
- 1980 Otago
- 1981 Otago
- 1982 Auckland
- 1983 Otago
- 1984 Victoria
- 1985 Massey
- 1986 Otago
- 1987 Waikato
- 1988 Canterbury
- 1989 Auckland
- 1990 Otago at Otago
- 1991 Victoria at Victoria
- 1992 No tournament - meningitis
- 1993 Otago at Canterbury
- 1994 Waikato at Waikato
- 1995 Canterbury at Lincoln
- 1996 Waikato at Massey
- 1997 Otago at Otago
- 1998 Victoria at Victoria
- 1999 Canterbury at Canterbury
- 2000 Victoria at Victoria
- 2001 Otago at Otago
- 2002 Auckland at Waikato
- 2003 Massey at Massey
- 2004 Otago at Otago
- 2005 AUT at North Shore
- 2006 Victoria at Wellington
- 2007 Canterbury at Christchurch
- 2008 Victoria at Rotorua
- 2009 Victoria at Taranaki

== See also ==
- College sports
