= UniQ Aotearoa =

Queer student groups in New Zealand

UniQ Aotearoa Logo

UniQ Aotearoa (UniQ) was Queer Students' Association of New Zealand, a collection of queer student groups at universities, polytechs and colleges of education in New Zealand.

UniQ was active at most New Zealand universities and several polytechnics. The term queer was considered to have been reclaimed and was used by UniQ to acknowledge both gender and sexual diversity. It was considered to be collective term for non-heterosexual and non-cisgender identities; inclusive but not exclusive to lesbian, gay, bisexual, transgender, takatāpui, intersex and asexual people.

The name 'UniQ' comes from the name given to the work carried out by Matt Soeberg. Soeberg was employed as a Queer Project Worker by New Zealand Union of Students' Associations (NZUSA) to address the needs of queer students. The overall name given to the work was 'UNIQ - Creating Support for Lesbian, Gay, Bisexual and Transgender Students' which was eventually adopted by various student groups as their name.

UniQ worked to promote education and understanding for and about queer students undertaking tertiary study and regular events held around New Zealand's tertiary institutions. This included Pride Week when local UniQs facilitate a week-long series of events usually culminating in a dance party.

== Members ==
UniQ Aotearoa was made up of various local iterations of UniQ and other queer student groups at different universities and polytechs across New Zealand.

UniQ Members
Name	University
UniQ Canterbury	University of Canterbury
Wintec UniQ	Waikato Institute of Technology
UniQ Auckland	Auckland University
OUT@AUT	Auckland University of Technology
UniQ Otago	Otago University
UniQ Waikato (formerly Askew - Waikato)	University of Waikato
UniQ Victoria	Victoria University of Wellington
UniQtec	Unitec Institute of Technology
UniQ Massey Wellington	Massey University
Massey UniQ Palmerston North	Massey University

== National Conferences ==
UniQ used to meet once annually at a national conference, starting from 1997. Initially known as the Queer Youth and Students (UniQ) Conference, these conferences were opportunities for students across New Zealand to come together to discuss and address the wide range of current issues facing queer students. These conferences usually included workshops, planning sessions and guest speakers (including political, religious and disabled speakers).

UniQ National Conferences
Year	University / Location	Host
1997	Massey University	Massey University Students' Association (MUSA)
1998	Wellington	New Zealand Union of Students' Associations (NZUSA)
1999	University of Canterbury	University of Canterbury Students' Association (UCSA)
2001	Massey University	MUSA
2002	Otago University	Otago University Students' Association (OUSA)
2003	Auckland University of Technology	Auckland Student Movement (AUSM)
2004	University of Waikato	Waikato Students' Union (WSU)
2005	Victoria University of Wellington	Victoria University of Wellington Students' Association (VUWSA) and UniQ Victoria
2006	Massey University	MUSA
2007	Auckland University and Auckland University of Technology	UniQ Auckland and Out@AUT
2008	Otago University	OUSA
2009	Victoria University of Wellington	UniQ Victoria
2010	University of Canterbury	UCSA
2011	University of Waikato	Askew Waikato

== See also ==
- LGBT New Zealand
- Gay rights in New Zealand
