= List of New Zealand tertiary students' associations =

The following is a list of New Zealand Tertiary (University and Polytechnic) Students' Associations:

== Tertiary students' associations ==
- Auckland University of Technology: AUTSA (Auckland University of Technology Students' Association)
- Massey University: TTAP (Te Tira Ahu Pae)
- Victoria University of Wellington: VUWSA (Victoria University of Wellington Students' Association)
- UCOL (Universal College of Learning) : AS@U (Association of Students at UCOL)
- University of Waikato : WSU (Waikato Students' Union)
- Waikato Institute of Technology (WINTEC) : SAWIT (Students' Association of Waikato Institute of Technology)
- University of Auckland : AUSA (Auckland University Students' Association)
- University of Canterbury : UCSA (University of Canterbury Students' Association)
- Lincoln University: LUSA (Lincoln University Students' Association)
- University of Otago : OUSA (Otago University Students' Association)
- Otago Polytechnic : OPSA (Otago Polytechnic Students' Association)
- Christchurch Polytechnic : CPSA (Christchurch Polytechnic Students' Association)
- BOP Polytechnic Bay of Plenty Polytechnic Students Association (BOPPSA)
- SANITI - Student Association of the Nelson Marlborough Institute of Technology Inc
- Students' Association at Unitec New Zealand, Auckland, New Zealand
- Tai Poutini Polytechnic Students' Association
- Wellington Institute of Technology (WelTec) and Whitireia New Zealand: Student Connection
- WITSA - Waiariki Institute of Technology Student Association
- International Pacific College Students Association (IPCSA)

== Māori students' associations ==
(all work in parallel to mainstream associations):

- New Zealand Union of Students' Associations: Te Mana Akonga
- Auckland University of Technology: Titahi ki Tua
- Massey University: Te Tira Ahu Pae
- Victoria University of Wellington : Ngai Tauira
- University of Auckland: Ngā Tauira Māori
- University of Canterbury: Te Akatoki
- Lincoln University: Te Awhioraki
- University of Otago: Te Rōpū Māori
- University of Waikato: Te Waiora

== Pacific student associations ==
All Pacific student associations work in parallel to mainstream associations:

- New Zealand Union of Students' Associations: Tauira Pasifika
- Auckland Institute of Studies: Maori Pacific Island Students Association (MPI)
- Auckland University of Technology: Auckland University of Technology Pacific Islands Students' Association (Fale Niu)
- University of Auckland: Auckland University Pacific Islands Students' Association (AUPISA)
- University of Otago: University of Otago Pacific Islands Students' Association (UOPISA)

== Nationwide student bodies ==
- New Zealand Union of Students' Associations (NZUSA, formerly New Zealand University Students' Association)
- Te Mana Ākonga, National Māori Students' Association (parallel partnership with NZUSA)
- Tauira Pasifika, National Pasifika Students' Association (parallel partnership with NZUSA)
- New Zealand Tongan Tertiary Students' Association NZTTSA (MoU with NZUSA)
- Aotearoa Student Press Association
- Every Nation Campus Ministries (ENCM)
- Student Life New Zealand (Christian students' association)
- Tertiary Students Christian Fellowship
- UniQ (association of gay, lesbian, bisexual, transgender, transsexual, takatāpui and intersex students)
- University Sport New Zealand
- New Zealand Law Students' Association (NZLSA)
- Student Job Search (SJS)
- New Zealand Medical Students' Association (NZMSA)
- New Zealand International Students' Association (NZISA)

== See also ==
- Tertiary education in New Zealand
