= Student loans in New Zealand =

Loans incurred to pay for higher education

Student loans in New Zealand are provided by the Student Loan Scheme (SLS), introduced in New Zealand in 1992, which provides student loans and allowances for course fees, course-related costs, and living costs to tertiary students who meet StudyLink's funding criteria. StudyLink is the public organisation under the Ministry for Social Development that is responsible for administering student loans and allowances. Eligibility criteria apply, and courses must be approved.

Repayment of student loans is required as soon as the income threshold of $22,828 (2024 tax year) is reached, this applies even if the borrower is still studying. Repayments are managed by the Inland Revenue Department (IRD), and information about the borrower's loans can be accessed through their myIR account. The loan repayment rate is 12% of every dollar over the income threshold, re-calculated at the start of the tax year.

== Student loan eligibility criteria ==
The maximum living cost payment that can be made is $302.32, students can borrow anything up to this amount. The criteria for eligibility for a student loan are as follows:

=== Residency Criteria ===
The student must be a New Zealand citizen, or ordinarily resident in New Zealand and have: lived in New Zealand for at least 3 years and held a residence class visa for at least 3 years.

There are exceptions to the residency criteria: where the student is a refugee or protected person or their immediate family, an Afghan evacuee, or a Christchurch Response Visa.

=== Approved Courses ===
One must study a course approved by the Tertiary Education Commission for Student Allowances and Student Loans. Student Allowance approved courses must be an undergraduate course (level 7 or below on the National Qualifications Framework) or a bachelor's degree with Honours. Student Loan must be studied full-time; part-time and 32 weeks or more; or part-time, less than 32 weeks and with at least 0.25 EFTS.

=== Returning Students ===
Returning students are subject to additional requirements. If a student has completed 1.6 EFTS they must have passed at least half of the courses undertaken in the past five years to be eligible for a student loan.

== Student allowance eligibility criteria ==
The ability to claim course fees, course-related costs, and living costs under a student allowance depends on the student and the student's parents' income. While a student is younger than 24, their parent's income and bereaved parents are relevant factors; however, once they are older than 24 this will no longer be considered. A student can earn up to $240.70 per week before proportionate deductions are made from their student allowance. If a student has a partner and is over 24 or is supporting a child, their student allowance eligibility will be further affected. There is an eligibility calculator for students to assess their allowance eligibility.

Administration fee: A $60 establishment fee is charged each time a student opens a loan account, which will be good for 52 weeks.

== Loan composition ==
The student loan comprises three parts:

- Compulsory fees – cover tuition fees and various levies. These are paid to the tertiary institution directly.
- Course-related costs – helps cover costs of items necessary to complete study. Including stationery, textbooks, equipment, tools, technology and voluntary student association fees. The borrower is allowed up to $1000 per year in course-related fees, which they can claim over the year. These are paid into the borrower's bank account. To receive the payment a student must be under 55 and studying full-time.
- Living costs – helps cover day-to-day living expenses. Including, but not limited to, food, rent, bills, services and transport. As of 1 April 2023, the maximum payment for living costs is $302.32 per week, plus any student allowance received. This figure is adjusted every year in April to account for inflation. Students can only receive the living costs payment if they are studying full-time and under 55. Students who are on a Work and Income benefit cannot receive the loan to cover their weekly living costs.

== New loans ==
There is a debt eligibility check for new loan applications. It is not possible to borrow through the Student Loan Scheme if the student has $500 or more in default at the time of your application and at least some portion of that amount has been overdue for a year or more. This applies to all new student loan applications received by StudyLink on or after 7 February 2013 and includes all unpaid repayment obligations, late payment interest, penalties, and amounts under installment arrangement.

== Repayment ==
Repayment of student loans taken in New Zealand is required as soon as the income threshold of $22,828 (2024 tax year) is met by the borrower, this applies even if the borrower is still studying. Repayments are managed by the Inland Revenue Department (IRD) and important information about loans, such as checking loan balances and requesting reduced loan repayments can be accessed through the borrower's myIR account. The loan repayment rate is 12% of every dollar over the income threshold. This threshold is re-calculated at the start of the tax year to account for changing living costs.

For borrowers who are New Zealand-based, loans are interest-free and are automatically deducted out of salary or wages along with tax through the addition of "SL" to the borrower's tax code. If the borrower does not correctly add the "SL" to their tax code, the IRD will contact the borrower's employer to ensure this is updated and additional deductions will be taken from the salary or wages of the individual to catch up on the repayments. If a borrower is self-employed or has any other taxable source of income that amounts to greater than the repayment threshold, they must advise the IRD so the amount repayable can be calculated. While student loans remain interest-free for as long as the borrower is living in New Zealand if repayments are not made on time, late payment interest can be charged on the overdue amount at 6.8%. If a borrower is having difficulties meeting the repayment requirements, the IRD may offer repayment options, as well as offering a reduced late payment interest rate, if the borrower contacts the IRD about the late payments, at a rate of 4.9%.

When borrowers leave New Zealand for longer than 6 months, interest is added to their loan at a rate of 4.9%. Repayment amounts are sent to the borrower biannually and the amount to be paid is initially calculated based on the loan balance when the borrower left the country, further repayment amounts are calculated based on the loan balance at the end of every tax year that the borrower remains overseas. Loan repayments can be suspended on request for those on no/low income overseas, however, interest still accumulates.

For borrowers in New Zealand with more than one job, applying for a student loan special deduction rate for secondary earnings is possible if the student earns less than the pay period repayment threshold from one's main job.

Student loans are written off if the borrower dies; their estate is only obliged to pay any outstanding loan repayments up to the date of the borrower's death.

== Key actors and agencies ==
The two main agencies responsible for the maintenance and functioning of the student loan system are the Inland Revenue (IRD) and the Ministry of Social Development. After the inception of interest-free student loans by the 5th Labour government led by Helen Clark it was not until 2009 that the entity Study Link was formed as a consolidated platform for education providers and students to manage loans which is an entity of the Ministry of Social Development. In the Student Loan Scheme Act of 2011, we saw definitive outlines of the responsible parties and their responsibilities.

The act outlines two individuals whom we see more represented on an organizational level, this is the Commissioner, who is defined in the Tax Administration Act of 1994 as the Commissioner of Inland Revenue, and the loan manager, who is the individual responsible for their loan. The Commissioner is responsible for the maintenance of the loan by providing the loan manager with information on the loan balance, organize the collection of the loan, and confirming the identity of the loan manager. The Chief Executive is also referred to as having certain responsibilities, the Chief Executive is defined by the authority of the Prime Minister as being responsible for the administration of the Social Security Act of 2018.

In the Act there are more symbolically binding responsibilities of the Crown, but the main authorities outlined are the commissioner and loan manager. There is a depth of legally binding responsibility for the individual who takes out a loan or the individual who officially accrues responsibility to manage the loan of another individual outlined in the Act.

The party in power also differentiates opinion towards student loans and the student loan interest at the time since Helen Clark's Labour government student loans have never returned to having interest. Still, different parties have different degrees of support for subsidizing tertiary education, with the 2017 Labour govt introducing first year free fees. The Act party in 2016 promoted policies that added interest back to student loans, which they removed in 2020. No major parties are officially campaigning to add interest back to student loans there are just policy variations on policy towards student loan living costs and fee subsidization.

== History ==
The loan system has been changed and modified significantly since its inception in 1992. Initially, it provided bulk payments to students and charged lower than market interest rates from the initial drawdown. This led some students to use this money for investment purposes, benefiting them but leading to a widespread perception of student excesses.

=== Background ===
Before student loans were implemented in New Zealand, university tuition fees were introduced by the 4th Labour Government led by Prime Minister David Lange and Finance Minister David Caygill in 1989. This fee was $129, but in 1990 it was increased to $1250, a 969% increase on the prior year.

In 1991, the 4th National Government, led by Prime Minister Jim Bolger and Finance Minister Ruth Richardson abolished the flat-rate fee and allowed the individual universities to set their fees.

=== Introduction and the 1990s ===
On 21 December 1992, the Student Loan Scheme Act 1992 was commenced. According to former Prime Minister Jacinda Ardern, the take-up rate for the loans was high. Interest was accumulated on these loans for all loanees including domestic-based ones. This was not changed until 2000 for a small number of people, and 2006 for New Zealand-based people. Another important thing to note is a minimum $15,000 fine for a person deemed to have committed an offense about avoiding or misrepresenting their loan repayment deductions to people such as employers, PAYE tax intermediaries, and more. If this was repeated, up to the maximum amount of a $25,000 fine could be handed out.

In 1993, the requirement that borrowers had to have passed a minimum of 50% of their prior two years of tertiary work was removed. In 1997 there was a change to the amount of money that could be borrowed for living costs. In 1999 further changes were made, including restrictions on what could be borrowed for and the introduction of parental consent for borrowers who were 17 years old or younger. In 2000, the 5th Labour Government led by Prime Minister Helen Clark and Finance Minister Michael Cullen removed interest for full-time, full-year students and part-time or part-year students on low incomes. In 2001 a new interest-setting mechanism was established.

There were further amendments to the act through the years. The Student Loan Scheme Act was repealed and replaced completely on 1 April 2012. The replacement act is known as the Student Loan Scheme Act 2011.

=== Changes under the fifth Labour Government ===
In 2001 a growing debt mountain caused the Fifth Labour Government to stop interest payments while students studied. Then in 2005, they rode to election on the promise of stopping interest for all those remaining in New Zealand.

From 2001, all full-time students were made exempt from interest while studying, and from 2006 all borrowers resident in New Zealand have been exempted from interest. (Technically interest is applied to all loans, but written off if the borrower is resident in New Zealand.)

On 22 March 2007, the Government introduced a three-year 'loan repayment holiday' for those overseas. In practice, this is a uniform extension of the previous ability to waive repayments until a later date. As before, interest accumulates during this period.

=== Changes under the fifth National Government ===
The National Party initially opposed the interest-free loans policy, but after it lost the 2005 election, in early 2008 said it would keep interest off student loans. After it was elected to government in the 2008 general election, the Fifth National Government has kept interested off student loans but has introduced a number of changes designed to make students repay their loans faster, and introduced penalties for loan defaulters.

From 1 April 2009, voluntary student loan repayments above $500 in a tax year were awarded a 10% bonus.

To increase the repayment rate of borrowers, information sharing between Government departments was introduced in 2010.

From 1 April 2012, the maximum time for a repayment holiday was reduced from 3 years to 1 year.

From 1 April 2012, access to student loans was cut for people over 55. Also, an annual loan administration fee of $40 is charged.

From 1 April 2013, the repayment rate for student loan deductions increased from 10% to 12% and the voluntary repayment bonus was abolished. (Student allowances were also restricted to four years worth of study.) The changes that came into effect in 2013 were introduced because the Government wanted to shift its investment from student support to supporting universities. Changes also raised the minimum mandatory repayments for people earning more than $367 a week. The University Students Association criticized the changes, saying people choosing to pay back loans quickly would no longer be rewarded, and repayment thresholds were too low, at about 34% below the median weekly income.

The changes were criticised by Labour Party Tertiary Education Spokesperson, Grant Robertson, who said they would "dampen demand" for tertiary education and drive graduates overseas.

In 2013, the Government announced that student loan defaulters could be arrested at New Zealand's border. It was an effort to recover $430 million of defaulted student loan debt, "80 per cent of which is owed by overseas borrowers". The move was criticized by NZUSA, which said the policy would be ineffectual, and could potentially create "student loan refugees".

=== Student debt levels ===
Since the inception of the student loan scheme in 1992, students have borrowed approximately $24.7 billion in student loans with debt levels continuing to rise significantly over time. The total amount of student loan debt in New Zealand has increased from 3.52 billion in 2000 to 16.9 billion in 2026. In 2003, the average student loan debt was 12,280. In 2026 it was $18,301, an increase of 50% over twenty-three years. However, these numbers can be dependent on the course of study a student is taking and the length of time spent having to complete their degree. There have been several factors that contribute to this increase in student debt levels which include but are not limited to rising tuition fees and increasing living costs. Whilst student debt seems to increase continuously, the number of students continuing to enroll has increased by 4.7 percent, from 380,090 in 2020 to 397,785 in 2021. From students that enrolled in tertiary education in 2021, 82.2 percent of students borrowed from the government to pay for their course fees which is a decrease of 4.0 percent compared to the year before. The increasing participation rates in tertiary education could cause student debt levels to increase more as living costs, course and tuition fees, and course-related costs continue to rise. There have been several policies that have been implemented to try and reduce student levels and encourage more school leavers to attend tertiary education which includes the introduction of interest-free student loans in 2006 for full-time students living in New Zealand and the fees-free tertiary education and training resulted in a higher level of gross debt as more students borrow money to fund their education.

== Cost of living ==
There is some criticism about whether the living costs payment or student allowance reflects actual living costs for students. Actual costs will vary for students and are dependent on region and lifestyle. The 2023 Managing Money Report by Victoria University of Wellington includes a sample budget. The sample budget placed the weekly living costs of a student flatting in 2023 in Wellington at $488. A similar report by the University of Canterbury estimated that the weekly costs of a flatting student were $348. Estimates by both Universities are above the current living cost payment of $302.32. The People's Inquiry into Student Wellbeing found that due to high living costs in 2022 and despite receiving living costs payments or student allowances, some students struggled to cover day-to-day costs. The Inquiry recommended adjusting student allowance payments to match the cost of living. These high living costs can be attributed to the high levels of inflation experienced in 2022. To account for the high levels of inflation, the Ministry of Social Development increased the living costs payment to $302.32 from $281.96 on 1 April 2023. Some students believe this increase is still not enough to offset the impacts of inflation. The president of the New Zealand Union of Students Associations also believes the $20 increase was not significant enough. In 2022, the student allowance increased by $25 per week, some students stated this was not enough to align with their cost of living.

== See also ==
- Tertiary education in New Zealand
- Student loans in Australia (HELP loans)
- Welfare in New Zealand
