= Camilla Belich =

New Zealand Labour Party politician

Camilla Belich MP
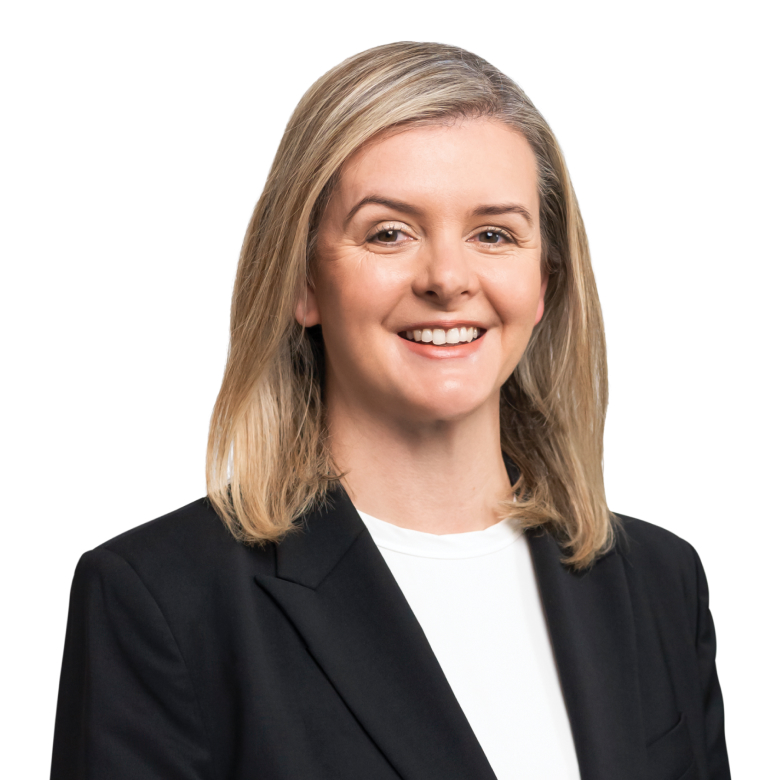
- Belich in 2023

Member of the New Zealand Parliament for Labour party list
- Incumbent
- Assumed office 6 December 2023
- Preceded by: Andrew Little
- In office 17 October 2020 – 14 October 2023

Personal details
- Born: 1982 or 1983 (age 42–43)
- Party: Labour
- Spouse: Andrew Kirton
- Relations: Jim Belich (grandfather); James Belich (uncle)
- Children: 3
- Profession: Lawyer

Camilla Vera Feslier Belich is a New Zealand lawyer, trade unionist and politician. She has been a Member of Parliament, representing the New Zealand Labour Party, since 2020.

== Early life and family ==
Belich was raised in Wellington, where her grandfather Sir Jim Belich was mayor from 1986 to 1992. Her parents were trade unionists. As a teenager, Belich attended Wellington East Girls' College and was a member of the Wellington City Youth Council. While in the seventh form, she was selected to represent Rongotai MP Annette King as a member of the third New Zealand Youth Parliament in 2000. She would go on to be one of six former youth MPs to be members of Parliament in 2021.

Belich studied te reo Māori and law at Victoria University of Wellington. She became involved in student politics and was co-president of the New Zealand University Students Association with Andrew Kirton, her future husband, in 2005. Kirton and Belich have three children, the third of whom was born after Belich was elected to Parliament.

== Legal career ==
Belich has worked as an employment lawyer, beginning her career at Oakley Moran, a Wellington law firm, before moving to London in 2009 where she worked for a law firm and later for Unison, the largest trade union in the United Kingdom between 2012 and 2016. There, she won acclaim for her role in winning a high-profile case in the Court of Justice of the European Union about safe working hours.

Returning to New Zealand, she joined the Wellington employment law firm Bartlett Law as a senior associate in 2017. She specialised in employment discrimination cases. She also worked for unions in New Zealand as a barrister and solicitor, firstly on equal pay issues at the New Zealand Council of Trade Unions until 2019, and subsequently for the Public Service Association in Auckland.

== Member of Parliament ==
New Zealand Parliament
Years	Term	Electorate	List	Party
2020–2023	53rd	List	30	Labour
2023–2026	54th	List	26	Labour
2026–present	55th	List	23	Labour

=== First term, 2020–2023 ===
Belich was considered as a possible Labour candidate in Rongotai for the 2017 general election. She was selected as a Labour candidate in the 2020 general election. She ran for the electorate of Epsom, finishing second, but became an MP based on her ranking of 30th on the Labour party list. In her first term, she was the deputy chair of the education and workforce select committee until 2023 when she became the chair of the committee as well as a junior government whip.

In 2023, Belich inherited Duncan Webb's private members bill, the Companies (Directors Duties) Amendment Bill, which amended the Companies Act 1993 to remove doubt that company directors may consider matters other than maximising profit, such as environmental, social, and corporate governance and Treaty of Waitangi considerations, when discharging their duties. The bill was described as "controversial" because it failed to receive select committee support, was perceived to increase the risk of litigation for companies and directors, and because it imposed no new obligations. Nonetheless, it passed its third reading on 1 August 2023 with Belich saying in the debate that the bill started from a misunderstanding that business must be profitable at all costs and that the bill, in its final draft, provided clarity to avoid future misunderstandings about company law.

Ahead of the 2023 general election, Belich sought to succeed retiring former prime minister Jacinda Ardern in the safe Labour electorate of Mount Albert. Despite having Ardern's personal support, Belich missed out with fellow list MP Helen White winning the selection. She was later re-selected as Labour's candidate in Epsom.

=== Second term, 2023–2026 ===
Belich was briefly unseated after the election. She placed third in Epsom, and her list placement of 26 meant she was the first list candidate not to be elected after the official results were announced. However, senior Labour MP Andrew Little opted not to take up his list seat and formally resigned from the House on 5 December. This resulted in Belich's election as a list MP to replace Little the following day.

She assumed the junior whip, workplace relations and safety, and emergency management portfolios in the Shadow Cabinet of Chris Hipkins. On 7 March 2025, Belich was allocated the Accident Compensation Corporation (ACC) and public services portfolios during a shadow cabinet reshuffle. She retained the emergency management portfolio but lost the workplace relations and safety portfolio, and a short time later left the whips team.

In late 2023, Belich inherited a member's bill previously in the name of Ibrahim Omer, who had been defeated in that year's election. The Crimes (Theft By Employer) Amendment Bill is intended to clarify that an employer withholding an employees' wages is theft and had passed its first reading while Labour was in government. Despite the change of government, and although a select committee had not recommended the bill pass, New Zealand First voted with the opposition parties to pass the bill through its third reading on 12 March 2025. The bill received royal assent on 13 March.

Another member's bill in Belich's name, the Employment Relations (Employee Remuneration Disclosure) Amendment Bill, passed its first reading in November 2024 with support from the opposition and National. The bill proposes to prohibit employers from taking disciplinary action against employees who disclose their remuneration to their colleagues. On 20 August 2025, Belich's bill banning employers from imposing gag orders on workers talking about their salaries passed into law with the support of the Green, Māori, and National parties. The New Zealand First and ACT parties opposed the legislation.

Following a cabinet reshuffle on 11 March 2026, Belich gained the justice portfolio.

In late January 2026, Belich and National Party MP Greg Fleming co-sponsored a modern slavery bill that proposes fining large companies NZ$200,000 for failing to monitor and report modern slavery in their supply chain. Due to the ACT Party and Minister for Workplace Relations Brooke van Velden's objections, the duo decided to co-sponsor the member's bill to circumvent the private member's bill ballot system. The bill passed its first reading on 29 April 2026 with the support of all parliamentary parties except ACT.

=== Third term, 2026–present ===
During the 2026 New Zealand general election, Belich contested the Epsom electorate for Labour. She was ranked 23rd on the Labour Party list.

Based on preliminary results, Belich came third place in the Epsom contest, winning 5,798 votes. However, she was able to return to Parliament on the Labour Party list.
