= Aotearoa New Zealand Tertiary Chaplaincy Association =

Professional association for tertiary chaplains in New Zealand

Aotearoa New Zealand Tertiary Chaplains’ Association
- Abbreviation: ANZTCA
- Founded: 2009
- Type: Professional association
- Location: New Zealand
- Region served: New Zealand
- Members: Accredited tertiary chaplains
- Website: www.anztca.org

The Aotearoa New Zealand Tertiary Chaplains’ Association (ANZTCA) is a professional body representing tertiary chaplains across universities, wānanga, and vocational institutions in New Zealand. It provides accreditation, ethical standards, and professional development opportunities for chaplains working in the tertiary education sector. Membership is open to chaplains of any religion or faith tradition.

== History ==
ANZTCA was established in 2009 to provide a shared professional and ethical framework for tertiary chaplains working within New Zealand’s diverse educational and faith contexts. It developed from earlier networks of inter-church and multi-faith tertiary chaplaincies, such as those operating within university pastoral care services in the early 2000s.

== Purpose and activities ==
The Association promotes best practice in tertiary chaplaincy by providing accreditation, ongoing training, and ethical guidance to its members. It also supports host institutions and faith-based oversight boards in maintaining accountable and effective chaplaincy services across campuses in Aotearoa New Zealand.

The Association’s core values are wellbeing, respect, compassion, community, and aiming high. ANZTCA recognises the importance of honouring the principles of Te Tiriti o Waitangi and supporting partnership with Māori as tangata whenua.

ANZTCA also holds an annual conference to encourage networking and professional development among tertiary chaplains.

== Accreditation ==
ANZTCA accredits tertiary chaplains who meet defined professional and ethical criteria. Accredited members are expected to uphold the Association’s Code of Ethical Practice, maintain professional boundaries, and participate in regular reflection and supervision.

== Ethical standards ==
The ANZTCA Code of Ethical Practice outlines expectations for chaplains to:

- act with integrity and respect for all people, regardless of faith, gender, sexuality, ethnicity, or belief;
- follow the policies and ethics of their host institutions;
- maintain clear professional boundaries in pastoral care relationships; and
- promote the spiritual and emotional wellbeing of tertiary students and staff.

The Code also details processes for addressing misconduct and maintaining accountability to host institutions and oversight boards.

== Governance ==
The Association is overseen by an elected Executive Committee responsible for accreditation, policy, and professional development initiatives. Membership is open to tertiary chaplains accredited by ANZTCA or those working toward accreditation.

== See also ==
- Tertiary education in New Zealand
- Chaplaincy
