= Victoria University of Wellington Students' Association =

Student association in New Zealand

- Motto: Your Students' Association
- Institution: Victoria University of Wellington
- Location: Wellington, New Zealand
- Established: 16 May 1899 (127 years ago)
- President: Aidan Donoghue
- Affiliations: Aotearoa Tertiary Students Association
- Website: www.vuwsa.org.nz

The Victoria University of Wellington Students' Association (Māori: Te Aka Tauira), also known as VUWSA, is the official student association at Victoria University of Wellington, New Zealand. VUWSA was established in 1899 as the Victoria University College Students' Society.

Following the enactment of the Education (Freedom of Association) Amendment Act 2011, VUWSA moved from being a compulsory students' association to a voluntary one in 2012.

VUWSA funds the student magazine Salient. It also funded the student radio station Salient FM until its discontinuation.

== Organisation ==
The Victoria University of Wellington Students' Association (VUWSA) is a representative body for students enrolled at Victoria University.

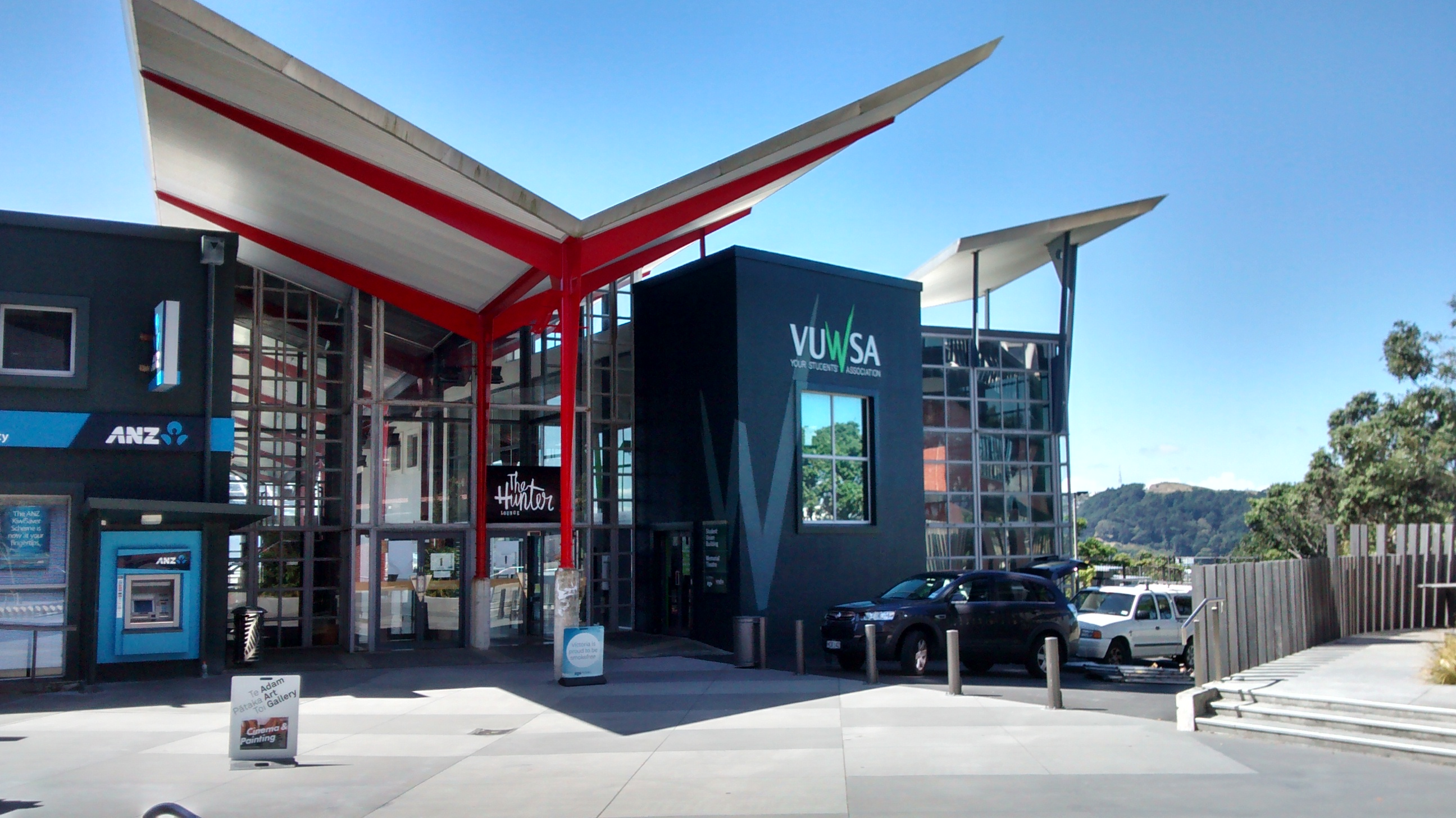
The VUWSA offices at the top of the Student Union Building, Victoria University of Wellington

=== VUWSA Executive ===
The VUWSA Executive consists of eleven positions who govern the association: the President, Academic Vice President, Welfare Vice President, Engagement Vice President, Treasurer–Secretary, Campaigns Officer, Clubs and Activities Officer, Education Officer, Equity Officer, Sustainability Officer and Postgraduate Officer.

==== VUWSA Executive ====
This is the VUWSA Executive for 2026.

Executive Position	2026 Officeholder
President	Aidan Donoghue
Academic Vice-president	Ethan Rogacion
Welfare Vice-president	Aspen Jackman
Engagement Vice-president	Charlotte Lawrence
Treasurer-Secretary	Sanjukta Dey
Campaigns Officer	Lewis Collins
Clubs and Activities Officer	Cam Dickson
Postgraduate Officer	George Baker
Education Officer	Aría Lal
Equity Officer	Pyper-Alex Adams
Sustainability Officer	Sophie Guerin

Past Executives
Year	President	Vice President (Academic)	Vice President (Welfare)	Vice President (Engagement)	Treasurer-Secretary	Education Officer	Sustainability Officer	Equity & Wellbeing Officer	Campaigns Officer	Clubs & Activities Officer
2024	Marcail Parkinson	Pierson Palmer	Liban Ali	Hana Pilkinton-Ching	Alyssa Fa'afua	Alison Winstanley	Patrick O'Connor	Josh Robinson	Hugh Acton (acting)	Lupeoaunuu Vaai
2023	Jessica Ye	Willa Aitken	Marcail Parkinson	Katherine Blow	Alyssa Fa'afua	Kayla Allen	Mika Hervel	Leia Weeds Kawai	Hana Pilkinton-Ching	Liban Ali
2022	Ralph Zambrano	Jessica Ye	Monica Lim	Katherine Blow	Amelia Blamey	Willa Aitken	Sophia Honey	Gwen Palmer Steeds	Hana Pilkinton-Ching	Alyssa Fa'afua
2021	Michael Turnbull	Cherri-Lyn Lomax-Morris	Ralph Zambrano	Grace Carr	Amelia Blamey	James Daly	Sophie Dixon	Monica Lim	Katherine Blow	Zoë Simpson
2020	Taylah Shuker (acting); Angelo "Geo" Robrigado (resigned)	Taylah Shuker (interim); Rinaldo Strydom (resigned)	Michael Turnbull	Joanna Li	Ralph Zambrano	Max Salmon (acting); Taylah Shuker (resigned to become interim Academic Vice President)	Sophie Dixon	Parminder Kaur	Grace Carr	Tara O'Connor
2019	Tamatha Paul	Angelo "Geo" Robrigado	Michael Turnbull (interim); Rhianna Morar (resigned)	Puawai Waller (resigned); Josephine Dawson (resigned)	Delia Fu	Rinaldo Strydom	Michael Turnbull (by-election), Kimberly Mcintyre (resigned)	Komal Mahima Singh (resigned)	Finn Carroll	Amelia "Millie" Osborne
2018	Marlon Drake	Simran Rughani (resigned)	Bethany Paterson	Tamatha Paul	Jack Donovan	Rhianna Morar (by-election), Isabella Lenihan-Ikin (interim), Sarah Yzendoorn (elected)	Ella Hughes	Paddy Miller	Angelo "Geo" Robrigado	Connor MacLeod
2017	Rory Lenihan-Ikin	Isabella Lenihan-Ikin	Anya Maule	Nathaniel Manning	Thomas Rackley	Lauren Gregg	Bethany Paterson	Tamatha Paul	Raven Maeder	Marlon Drake
2016	Jonathan Gee	Jacinta Gulasekharam	Rory Lenihan-Ikin	Nathaniel Manning	George Grainger	Annaliese Wilson	Anya Maule	Chrissy Brown (resigned), Tamatha Paul (co-opted in 2016 after election for 2017)	Alice Lyall	Tori-Claire Sellwood
2015	Rick Zwaan	Jonathan Gee	Madeleine Ashton-Martyn	Toby Cooper	Jacinta Gulasekharam	Ellen Humphries	Rory Lenihan-Ikin	Chennoah Walford	Nathaniel Manning	Rory McNamara
2014	Sonya Clarke	Rāwinia Thompson	Rick Zwaan	Declan Doherty-Ramsay	Jordan Lipski	Caroline Thirsk	Stephanie Gregor	Madeleine Ashton-Martyn	Alisdair Keating	Toby Cooper
2013	Rory McCourt	Sonya Clark	Simon Tapp	Mica Moore	Jordan McCluskey	Gemma Swann (resigned), Rāwinia Thompson (by-election)	Rick Zwaan	Matthew Ellison	Harry Chapman	Ramon Quitales
2012	Bridie Hood	Josh Wright	Ta’ase Vaoga	role non-existent	William Guzzo	Sam Vincent	role non-existent	role non-existent	Adele Redmond	Reed Fleming (Clubs), Andreas Triandafilidis (Activities)

==== VUWSA president ====
Aidan Donoghue is the President for 2026.

Past VUWSA presidents
- 2025 — Liban Ali
- 2024 — Marcail Parkinson
- 2023 — Jessica Ye
- 2022 — Ralph Zambrano
- 2021 — Michael Turnbull
- 2020 — Taylah Shuker (Acting)
- 2020 — Geo Robrigado (resigned)
- 2019 — Tamatha Paul
- 2018 — Marlon Drake
- 2017 — Rory Lenihan-Ikin
- 2016 — Jonathan Gee
- 2015 — Rick Zwaan
- 2014 — Sonya Clark
- 2013 — Rory McCourt
- 2012 — Bridie Hood
- 2011 — Seamus Brady
- 2010 — Max Hardy
- 2009 — Jasmine Freemantle
- 2008 — Joel Cosgrove
- 2007 — Geoff Hayward
- 2006 — Nick Kelly
- 2005 — Jeremy Greenbrook
- 2004 — Amanda Hill
- 2003 — Catherine Belfield-Haines
- 2002 — Fleur Fitzsimons
- 2001 — Chris Hipkins
- 2000 — Chris Hipkins
- 1999 — Hamish Hopkinson
- 1998 — Alastair Shaw
- 1997 — Alastair Shaw
- 1996 — Michael Gibbs
- 1995 — Paul Gibson
- 1994 — Juliet Gunby
- 1993 — David Guerin
- 1992 — Cushla Thomson
- 1991 — Jeremy Baker
- 1990 — Austen Sinclair
- 1989 — Leanne Hansen
- 1988 — Nigel Mander & Grant O'Neil
- 1987 — Andrew Little
- 1986 — Simon Johnson
- 1985 — Stephanie Haworth
- 1984 — Stephen Dawe
- 1983 — Leighton Duley
- 1982 — Paul Cochrane
- 1981 — Virginia Adams
- 1980 — Philip Sowman
- 1906 — Frederick Archibald de la Mare

=== Staff ===
The association employs a number of staff who work for students and assist the executive in achieving its strategic and operational goals. They are led by the Chief Executive, who oversees the financial and operational functions of the association, and includes two student advocates who provides independent and trained representation in cases of misconduct within the university and grievances with bodies such as StudyLink, WINZ, landlords and the university, a student representation coordinator, who coordinates and trains the student representative system consisting of over 600 students ranging from class representatives and faculty delegates, along with conducting regular programme reviews and advising on university policy, an association secretary, an events manager, a communications manager, a designer, an advertising manager, receptionists, and an accounts administrator.

=== VUWSA Trust ===
The association is supported both financially and strategically by the VUWSA Trust. The existence of the Trust is not well known by students.

The trust was established in 1975, and built up a significant reserve of assets when membership of student organisations was compulsory. While VUWSA was still collecting membership fees, about 15% of its fees were passed on to the Trust, which had built up around $8 million of assets by 2006. The Trust money was used to support students and clubs on campus, fund long-term investments such as the Student Union Building, and also serve as a backup fund in case VUWSA became a voluntary organisation.

The trust has invested in the fit-out of the Pipitea campus gym, and has also administered the student trust scholarships, fitted out houses for disabled student access and supported Student Job Search. Most recently, the trust made a significant financial contribution to the building of the recently completed Victoria University Hub on behalf of students.

Since the introduction of voluntary student membership, the financial assistance from the trust has enabled the association to reduce its deficit gradually without rapidly depleting its cash reserves.

The trust were the owners Vic Books, an on-campus cafe and book store that operated from 1975 until its closure in March 2023.

== History ==
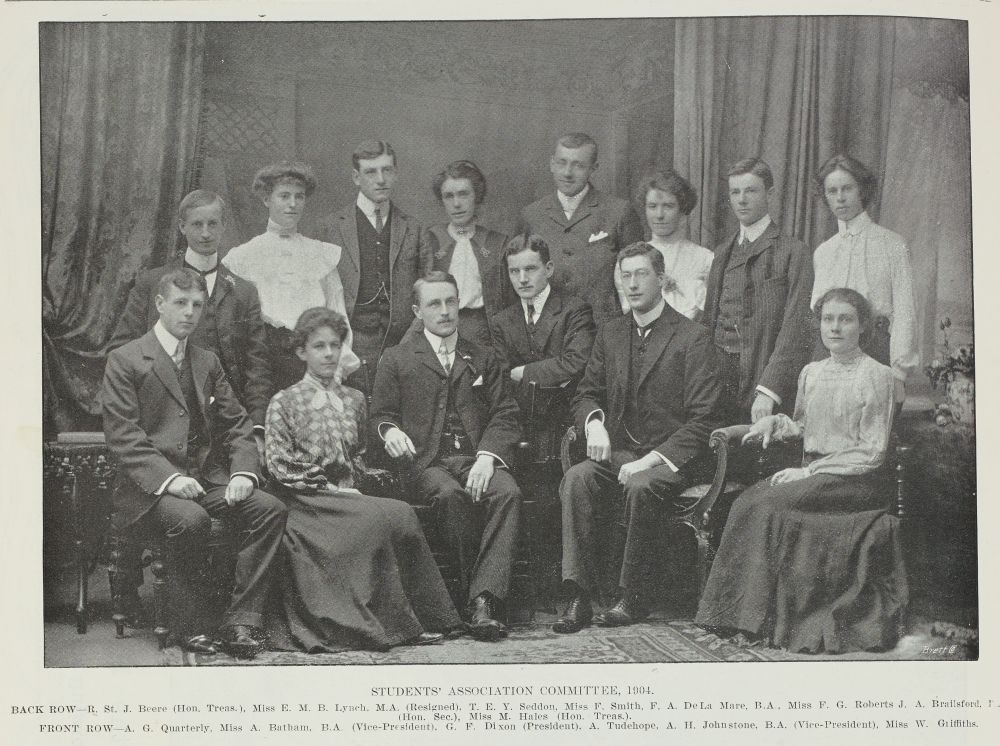
Victoria University College Students Association committee in 1904

VUWSA was established in 1899 as the Victoria University College Students' Society.

Historically, VUWSA has had a reputation as a left-wing organisation. VUWSA has traditionally maintained a heavy involvement in New Zealand's social and political movements such as the Nuclear Free New Zealand Movement, the Vietnam War and the War in Iraq. In recent years, VUWSA has supported the campaign for the Prostitution Reform Bill, the Civil Union Bill, opposed initiatives to raise the legal drinking age to 20 years, and supported marriage equality.

Since 1937 VUWSA have funded student magazine Salient. Since 2007 it has funded a station radio station, currently known as Salient FM.

=== 1990s ===
During the presidency of Alastair Shaw between 1997 and 1998, "VUWSA re-introduced the position of women's rights' officer, made moves towards a genuine partnership with Ngai Tauira, and organised a series of mass mobilisations that brought the government's privatisation for tertiary education plans to a halt."

=== 2000s ===
In 2007, President Geoff Hayward and Education Vice-president Paul Brown signed off on spending $22,222.22 on upgrading the organisation's van, with work including tinting the windows, fitting mag-wheels and painting the van black. Subsequently, the details of the expenditure on the van were suppressed by the 2008 Executive. In 2009, the Executive and President Max Hardy apologised to the student body for the misappropriation of funds on the van, and it was announced that the broken down van was to be sold in an attempt to regain some of the original expenditure. Hardy said: "I think we can now put the shameful VUWSA van controversy behind us".

Also in 2007, Salient revealed that acting Women's Rights Officer Clelia Opie had spent over $4,000 of VUWSA funds on psychic hotlines. She was subsequently dismissed from the role.

In 2008, President Joel Cosgrove courted controversy by wearing a T-shirt which said "I (heart) my penis" to a graduation ceremony in an official capacity. Cosgrove was attempting to promote sexual health for men, but his choice of clothing was widely criticised and labelled embarrassing.

In May 2009, President Jasmine Freemantle, who had run for president on a Workers' Party platform, was expelled from the Workers' Party. Furthermore, the Party called for her resignation as VUWSA President. The Party justified its actions by arguing that: "Her actions indicate outright rejection in practice of basic WP – and basic left-wing – principles." Freemantle wrote a long blog post in response, arguing that: "The reality is that my expulsion from the WP says more about the current direction the Party than it does about my politics, or the work I'm currently doing in my role as VUWSA President."

==== Campaign against voluntary student membership ====
In October 2009, Act on Campus orchestrated a special general meeting, and successfully passed a motion "that VUWSA actively supports the Education (Freedom of Association) Amendment Bill" by 45 votes to 35. The bill's aim was to introduce voluntary student membership. However, President Jasmine Freemantle subsequently announced that the motion had been declared null and void by the association's lawyer.

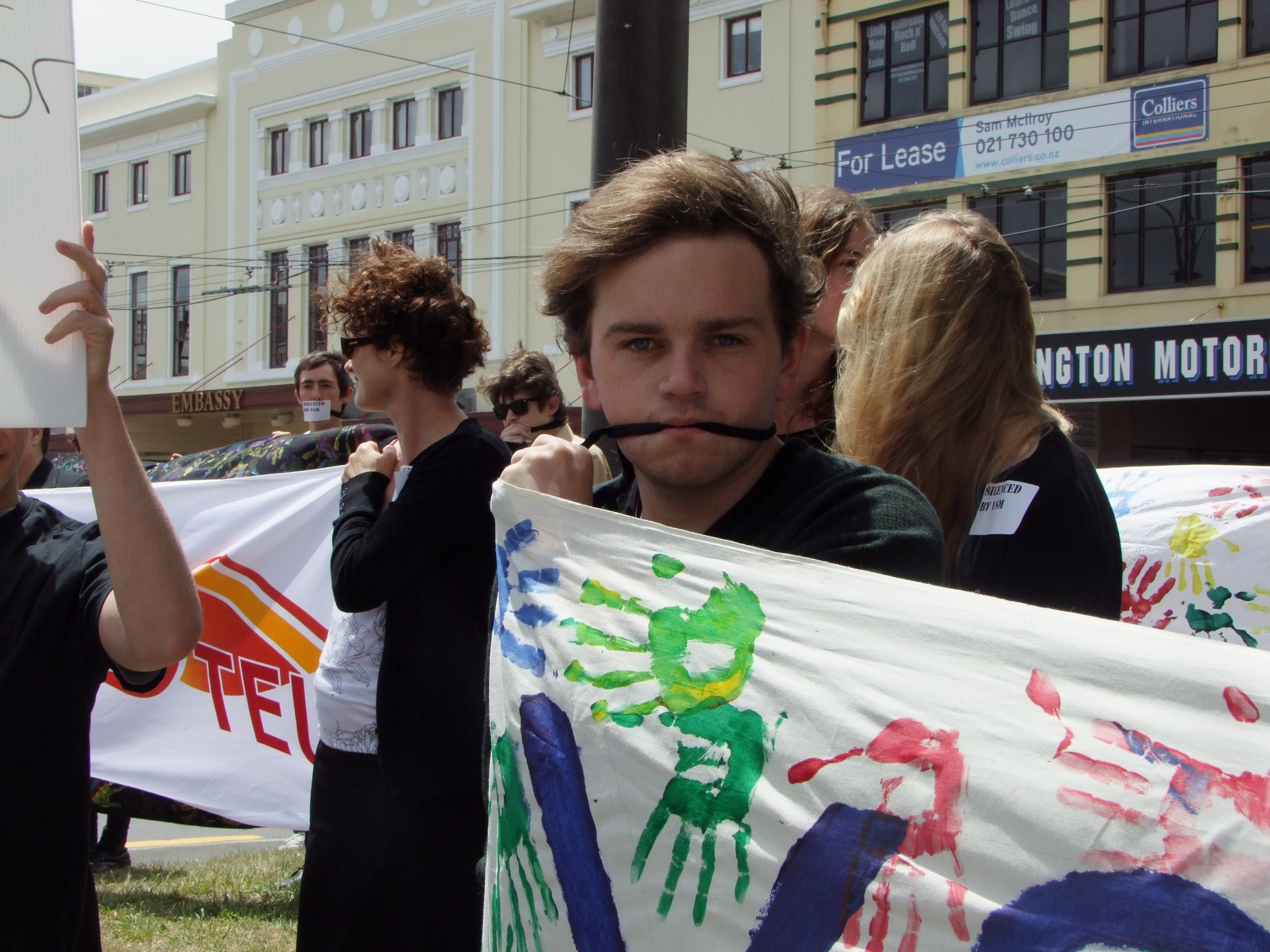
Max Hardy (President 2010) at an anti-VSM protest outside Heather Roy's office in 2010

VUWSA actively campaigned against the passing of voluntary student membership in 2010.

=== Initial stages of voluntary student membership: 2012–2013 ===
==== Passing of VSM legislation and impacts ====
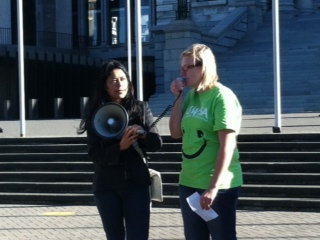
Bridie Hood (2012 President) speaking at a protest

Following the passing of Heather Roy's Education (Freedom of Association) Amendment Bill in 2011, membership of students' associations became voluntary from the beginning of 2012. In response to the passing of the legislation, VUWSA held a Special General Meeting on 13 October which approved a lowering of membership fees to $0. President Seamus Bradie said that "VUWSA wants to ensure that there are no financial barriers that may deter students from gaining independent representation and having a voice in issues that affect them". He also argued that despite the fact that the association would be funded in the future indirectly through the Student Services Levy which the university collects, the association would remain completely independent.

The effect of VSM on VUWSA's financial position has been significant, with the organisation's income dropping from $2.25 million in 2011 to less than $700,000 in 2013. This drop in income has meant that VUWSA has run a deficit in both 2012 and 2013, funded from pre-VSM cash reserves and grants from the VUWSA Trust. However, VUWSA President for 2013, Rory McCourt, has suggested that the organisation could be out of deficit by as early as 2014.

Salient has argued that although VSM has meant student associations are more stringent and careful in spending student money, the post-VSM environment has reduced financial accountability from the magazine's perspective. This is because the VUWSA Executive is able to move into committee when discussing contracts with the university, thereby barring the magazine from publishing any information about those proceedings. In contrast, under compulsory student membership, Salient was able to criticise and publicise any misspending or financial misdeeds.

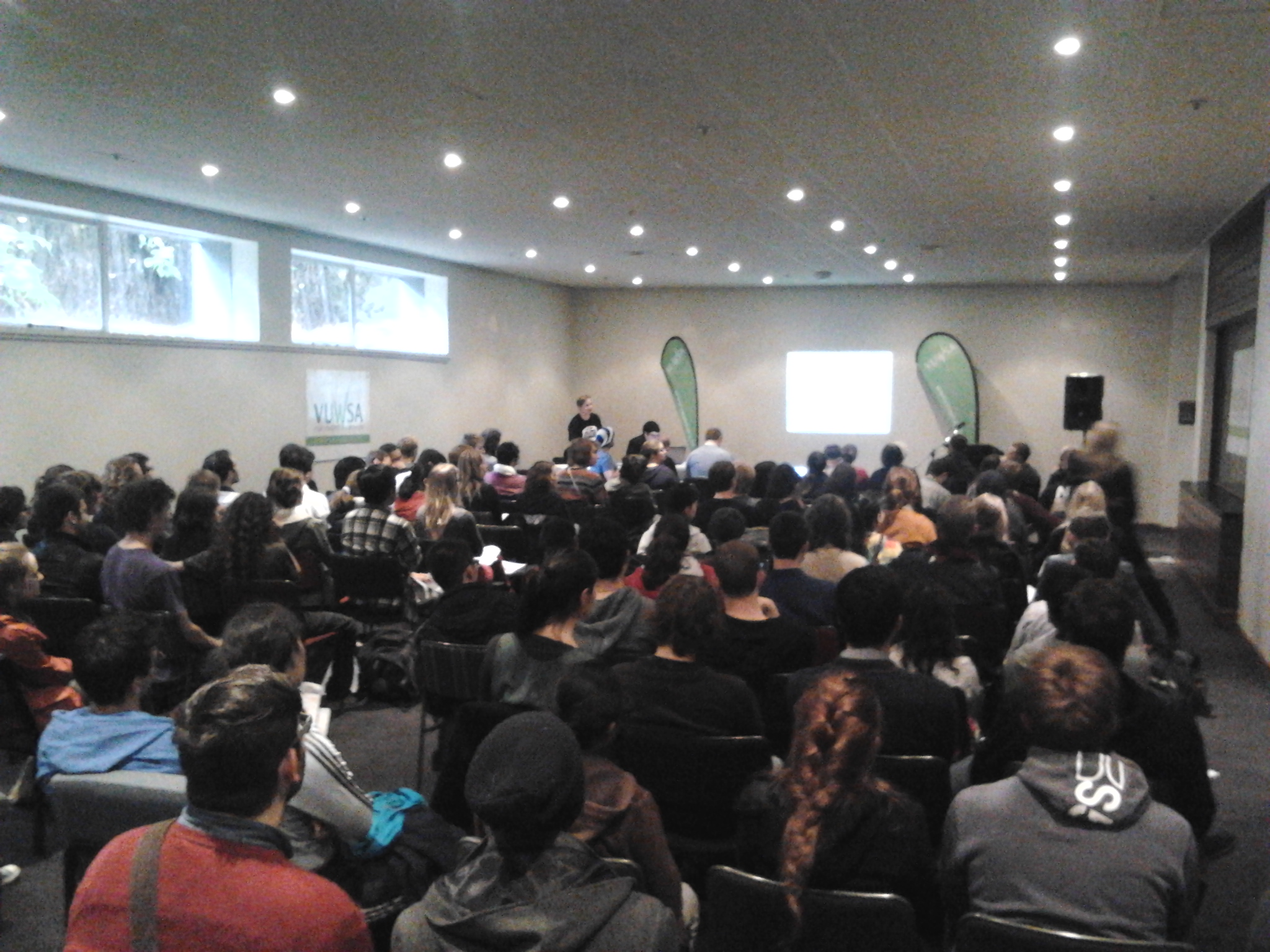
The 2013 VUWSA initial general meeting in the Memorial Theatre foyer

In September 2013, at its annual general meeting, the VUWSA Executive moved amendments to the Constitution so that non-VUWSA members would be able to vote in elections for the VUWSA Executive. This constitutional amendment, among others, were passed by the meeting. VUWSA President Rory McCourt argued the amendments were necessary because "[VUWSA's] about serving all students, and serving them equally. We believe all students have the right to choose who their representatives are”. Salient news editor Chris McIntyre wrote that "VUWSA effectively has a mandate to speak for all students again". The changes allowed non-members to vote in the 2013 VUWSA elections held in early October.

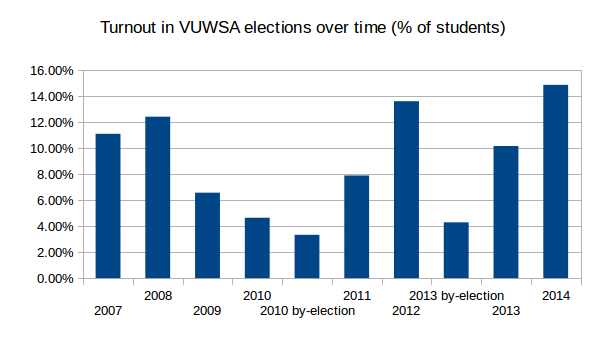
The turnout in recent VUWSA elections as a percentage of enrolled students at VUW.

==== University Council representation ====
After the introduction of VSM, in late 2011, VUWSA lost its seat on Victoria University's University Council as it was seen by the university as no longer having a universal mandate. Instead, the university created a new representative body, the Student Forum, and assigned the chair of that body to be on the University Council. VUWSA eventually withdrew support for the Student Forum, and an intensive representation review was conducted throughout 2013 to canvas student opinion on alternative arrangements. After the recommendations of the representation review were finalised, in December 2013 the University Council of Victoria University voted to give VUWSA back its seat on the council. President Rory McCourt commented: "There was much confusion when the Act Party's Voluntary Student Membership law was introduced, but we're heartened our University sees benefit in returning VUWSA to the heart of student representation at Victoria”. The move means that VUWSA is the first students' association in New Zealand to win back its seat on a university council. VUWSA's representative will sit on the University Council alongside another student representative elected at large by students.

=== VUWSA after the introduction of VSM: 2014–2018 ===
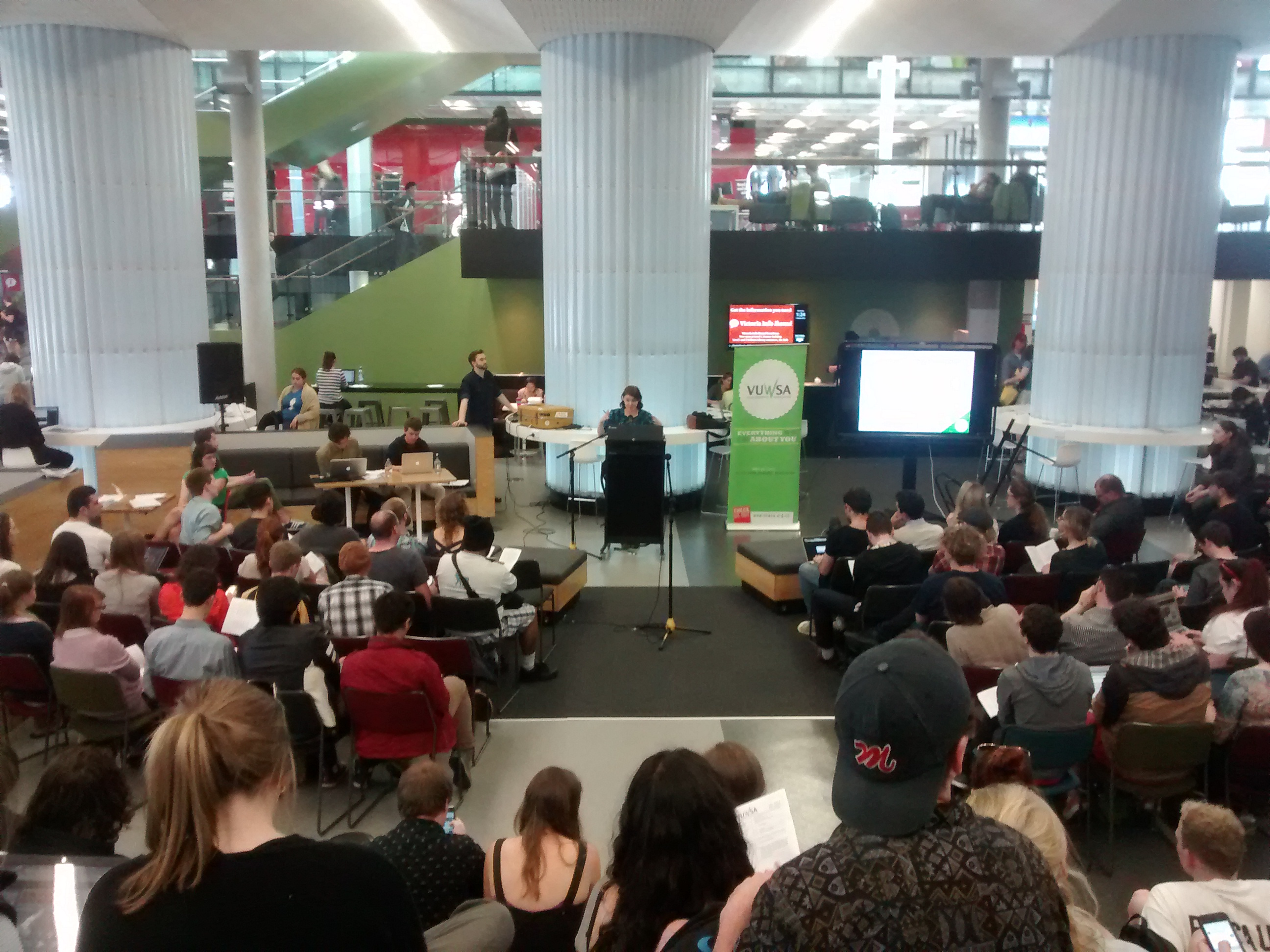
VUWSA's 2014 Annual General Meeting in the campus hub

In July 2014, VUWSA President Sonya Clark reflected on the impact of voluntary student membership two years after the change:

"If you're not aware of VSM, this law shook the foundation of students’ associations in New Zealand. Our role as an independent voice suffered hugely – we lost our right to represent you on University boards and committees to a University-run Student Forum. Funding dropped dramatically as we moved from a universal membership fee to an annual negotiation of funding with the University that didn't cover core costs. We had to close our satellite offices and cut right back on Orientation, events, Clubs funding and other services. The last two years have been tough."

Despite the challenges Clark outlined, she was optimistic about the future of the association, noting that the finances are projected to be out of deficit and the relationship with the university has improved. As part of a process of self-evaluation, VUWSA engaged an independent reviewer to investigate relationships with key partners. The reviewer found that: "VUWSA tries to do too many things, that our reputation rests too much on who is the President at the time, and that VUWSA doesn't speak enough for the ‘average’ student", findings that VUWSA agreed with.

In September 2014, VUWSA President Sonya Clark announced that after a unanimous vote by the executive, VUWSA would be withdrawing from the New Zealand Union of Students' Associations (NZUSA), saving VUWSA $45,000 every year in membership fees. President Clark said:

"Students gave us the mandate to stay if there were significant reforms. There haven't been. Now what's important is having the conversation to make sure there's a strong national voice on student issues, in a more effective use of $45,000 student dollars. We take our fiduciary responsibility with students’ money seriously."

In September 2015, students voted in a referendum (at the same time as Executive elections) to rejoin NZUSA. 1,251 students (72 per cent) voted for VUWSA to rejoin, while 476 students (28 per cent) voted to stay withdrawn.

=== Increasing engagement and activism, 2018–2020 ===
In March 2018, VUWSA together with the VUW Law Students Society marched to the offices of Russel McVeagh in Wellington to protest the growing culture of sexual violence in law firms. In August 2018, VUWSA led a student march to Parliament demanding higher funding for mental health support for tertiary students.

In September 2018, Tamatha Paul became the first ever Māori wahine to be elected president of VUWSA. She led an executive where the majority were people of colour. Paul went on to be elected to Wellington City Council while still President.

The 2019 Executive elections saw the largest number of candidates running for exec positions at 28. This saw the election of the first immigrant student as president in the person of Philippine-born law student Geo Robrigado. He previously served as chairperson of the volunteer corps of University of the Philippines Los Baños University Student Council, and is the oldest to be elected president at 32.

=== COVID-19, Wellington Student Volunteer Army, referendums and further campaigns, 2020–2022 ===
In response to the outbreak of the COVID-19 global pandemic in 2020, New Zealand Prime Minister Jacinda Ardern put the country under a Level 4 Nationwide Lockdown on March 25, 2020. This saw VUWSA operate primarily off-campus and online. Crucial services, such as community pantry operated under tight supervision and was later incorporated as part of the services of the Wellington Student Volunteer Army. The Wellington Student Volunteer Army was a local initiative to run errands and support those who were confined to their homes during the lockdown period. The Wellington Student Volunteer Army was supported by VUWSA, with a majority of the 2020 Executive being involved.

2020 also saw the rise of significant student issues, such as Victoria University's controversial decision to charge a "Hall's placeholder fee" during the lockdown period. This was met with strong opposition from VUWSA, local politicians and the public. Following backlash, on 1 May 2020 university leadership reversed their position on the fees. Other controversial issues that arose were that of a "5% grade bump", which VUWSA heavily petitioned in favour of, and the Whiria Project which has been shelved following negative responses.

In June 2020, elected VUWSA President, Geo Robrigado resigned citing deterioration of his physical and mental health. Robrigado is the first VUWSA President in four decades to step down. Elected Education Officer and interim Academic Vice President, Taylah Shuker, consequently replaced Robrigado.

The 2020 Executive elections saw the election of incumbent Welfare Vice President, Michael Turnbull as VUWSA President. In terms of representation, the elected 2021 Executive was 70% female and 30% male.

VUWSA endorsed a "yes" vote in the 2020 New Zealand cannabis referendum, "after 75 per cent of students voted in favour in the annual association referendum".

In response to the ongoing effects of the COVID-19 pandemic, 2021 saw increased activism from VUWSA, focused on COVID-19 resiliency and response. With the transition to dual-delivery teaching and learning in March 2021, VUWSA successfully campaigned against the use of exam invigilation software, ProctorU; citing issues of equity, privacy, troubleshooting, reliability and cost. Alongside other student representative groups, 2021 saw VUWSA lobby on a number of social issues from pastoral care, the banning of conversion therapy in New Zealand, and the Wellington City Council spatial and long-term plan.

In March 2021, VUWSA was a founding member of the Wellington Alliance Against Sexual Violence and helped organise a rally which saw over 500 demonstrators. In May 2021, the Wellington City Council announced a $7.7 million investment targeting city safety, sexual violence, and alcohol harm.

In July 2021, VUWSA launched a campaign for free public transport with a petition which called on the Government to trial free public transport for students and Community Services Card holders in the Wellington region. The petition attracted over 3,000 signatures. As part of this campaign, VUWSA helped establish and organise the Pōneke Collective for Public Transport Equity, which consists of around 40 organisations. The Collective has made submissions to the Greater Wellington Regional Council and is in ongoing conversations with the Minister for Transport, Michael Wood.

In September 2021, VUWSA, Mauri Ora, and a number of student representative groups organised a three-day COVID-19 mass vaccination event in The Hub, Kelburn Campus. This saw over 500 people receive the Pfizer–BioNTech COVID-19 vaccine.

2021 also saw a number of changes to the operations and management of Victoria University of Wellington, with VUWSA involved with changes to the Student Service Levy and the introduction of the Student Success Programme (Tītoko). Notably, in an email sent to staff and students on 9 August 2021, Vice-Chancellor Grant Guilford announced his retirement with his departure set for March 2022.

The outbreak of the SARS-CoV-2 Delta variant in New Zealand led to another nationwide lockdown in August 2021, with Alert Level restrictions in effect through to October. Consequently, the 2021 Executive election was postponed from its original date and was primarily run online. Despite low voter turnout, the election resulted in one of the most diverse VUWSA Executives in VUWSA history. The incumbent Welfare Vice President, Ralph Zambrano, was elected as VUWSA President, the first New Zealand-born Filipino VUWSA President. For the first time, the elected president and Vice Presidents were all of Asian descent.

=== VUWSA Referendum and Staff Cuts, 2022–present ===
In 2022, under the leadership of President Ralph Zambrano, the Victoria University of Wellington Students' Association (VUWSA) held a referendum to decide on continuing its membership with the New Zealand Union of Students' Associations (NZUSA). The decision stemmed from concerns about the effectiveness of NZUSA and the substantial $45,500 annual membership fee, which VUWSA believed could be better utilized for direct student benefits such as the community pantry and menstrual products. Despite these intentions, the referendum saw only a 5% voter turnout among the student body.

The referendum faced significant opposition. Former VUWSA President Michael Turnbull and other past executive members, including Taylah Shuker, expressed their concerns in an open letter. The letter argued that the referendum breached five clauses of the VUWSA constitution, ultimately leading to the referendum being deemed illegitimate and preventing VUWSA from leaving NZUSA. The open letter is available for view here.

Staff Cuts at Victoria University of Wellington In 2023, VUWSA faced the challenge of significant staff cuts at Victoria University of Wellington due to financial difficulties. The university announced plans to cut up to 260 full-time equivalent positions, impacting over 10% of its total staff, as part of efforts to address a projected $33 million deficit. This situation arose from chronic underfunding of tertiary education and declining enrolment numbers, compounded by the financial strains brought about by the COVID-19 pandemic.

VUWSA, led by President Jessica Ye, actively opposed these cuts, organising rallies in collaboration with the Tertiary Education Union (TEU) and other student groups. These protests highlighted the detrimental impact of staff cuts on the quality of education and the university community. In one notable rally on June 2, 2023, hundreds of students and staff gathered to voice their opposition and call for government intervention to properly fund universities and halt the redundancies

Jessica Ye emphasised the interconnectedness of student and staff welfare, arguing that the cuts were a result of long-standing underfunding issues. She stated that while the government had announced a 5% increase in tuition subsidies, this was insufficient to cover rising costs and inflation, leading to the current crisis. VUWSA continues to advocate for a comprehensive review and reform of the tertiary education funding model to prevent further erosion of educational quality and accessibility.

In April 2024, VUWSA President Marcail Parkinson was invited onto The Platform with Sean Plunkett following VUWSA's denouncement of a freedom of speech panel organised by Vice-Chancellor Nic Smith. The panel included controversial right-wing figure Jonathan Ayling, which sparked significant backlash from student groups on campus. Marcail Parkinson and other groups argued that the inclusion of such figures did not align with the university's values and could potentially harm the campus community.

== Notable alumni ==
Notable previous executive members include:

- Sir Tipene O'Regan (born 1939), academic and company director (1960–1961, Executive)
- Whetu Tirikatene-Sullivan (born 1932), former Cabinet Minister (1960–1961, Vice President)
- Professor Margaret Clark (born 1941), emeritus professor of politics at Victoria University of Wellington (1961–1962, Women's vice president)
- Ian McKinnon (born 1943), former Deputy Mayor of Wellington and VUW Chancellor (1966–1967, Men's vice president)
- Sue Kedgley (born 1948), former Green Party Member of Parliament (1967–1968, Executive)
- Andrew Little (born 1965), leader of Labour Party, leader of the Opposition, Cabinet Minister, Member of Parliament (1987, President)
- Chris Hipkins (born 1978), Prime Minister, Cabinet Minister, Member of Parliament (2000–2001, President)
- Fleur Fitzsimons, Wellington City Councillor (2000, Education Officer; 2001, Welfare VP; 2002, President)
- Guy Williams (born 1987), comedian (2009, Activities Officer)
- Tamatha Paul (born 1997), Green Party Member of Parliament for Wellington Central (2016–2017, Equity Officer; 2018, Engagement Vice President; 2019, President)

== See also ==
- List of New Zealand tertiary students' associations
- Tertiary education in New Zealand
