= Massey University Students' Associations Federation =

The Massey University Students' Associations Federation (MUSAF) represents the seven (five mainstream, two tangata whenua) student bodies at Massey University's three campuses in Palmerston North, Auckland, Wellington and Extramural students.

Massey University's governing body, the Massey University Council, has one seat allocated for a Student Representative, elected by the student population. Most often, this Council member occupies a leading office-bearer role with one of the student bodies.

== Massey University, Palmerston North ==
=== Massey University Students' Association (MUSA) ===
The Massey University Students' Association of Palmerston North Inc. represents students at Massey University, Palmerston North. MUSA publicises events, issues and anything else that concerns students. MUSA is a contributor to MASSIVE Magazine, which is printed monthly. A radio station by the name of Radio Control 99.4FM is administered by MUSA also.

=== Manawatahi ===
Manawatahi represents Māori students at Massey University, Palmerston North. Manawatahi organises and publicises events, develops and represents policies, and provides a supportive forum for Māori students who attend either Massey University (Turitea Campus) or Massey University College of Education (Hokowhitu Campus).

Manawatahi is a constituent member of Te Mana Ākonga (TMA).

== Massey University, Auckland ==
=== Albany Students' Association (ASA) ===
The Albany Students' Association Inc. represents the Students at Massey University, Albany.

ASA is a constituent member of the New Zealand Union of Students' Associations (NZUSA).

=== Te Waka o Ngā Ākonga Māori (TWONAM) ===
Te Waka o Ngā Ākonga Māori Inc is the Māori Students' Association on Massey University's Auckland Campus. Its role is to represent Māori students and publicise events, issues and anything else which concern Māori students at Massey University, Albany Campus.

== Massey University, Wellington ==
=== Massey at Wellington Students' Association (MAWSA) ===
Massey at Wellington Students Association represents the students at Massey University's Wellington Campus. Founded in 1970 as WePSA (Wellington Polytechnic Students' Association), it became MAWSA in 1999 when Wellington Polytech merged with Massey University to become the Wellington Campus, incorporating the polytech's school of design as the new College of Creative Arts. MAWSA produces the Massive magazine (formerly called Magneto), which since 2012 has been distributed across all Massey campuses following the closure of Chaff and Satellite in the aftermath of VSM in New Zealand.

=== Kōkiri Ngātahi ===
Kōkiri Ngātahi is the Māori Students' Association on Massey University's Wellington Campus.

== Extramural ==
=== Massey @ Distance (M@D) (Formerly Massey Extramural Students' Society (EXMSS)) ===
M@D is the student union representing distance (aka 'extramural') students. M@D provides online support, independent advocacy, scholarships, material assistance for contact course attendance, social media communities, and events for extramural students.

== See also ==
- List of New Zealand tertiary students' associations
