= Andrew Kirton =

New Zealand politician

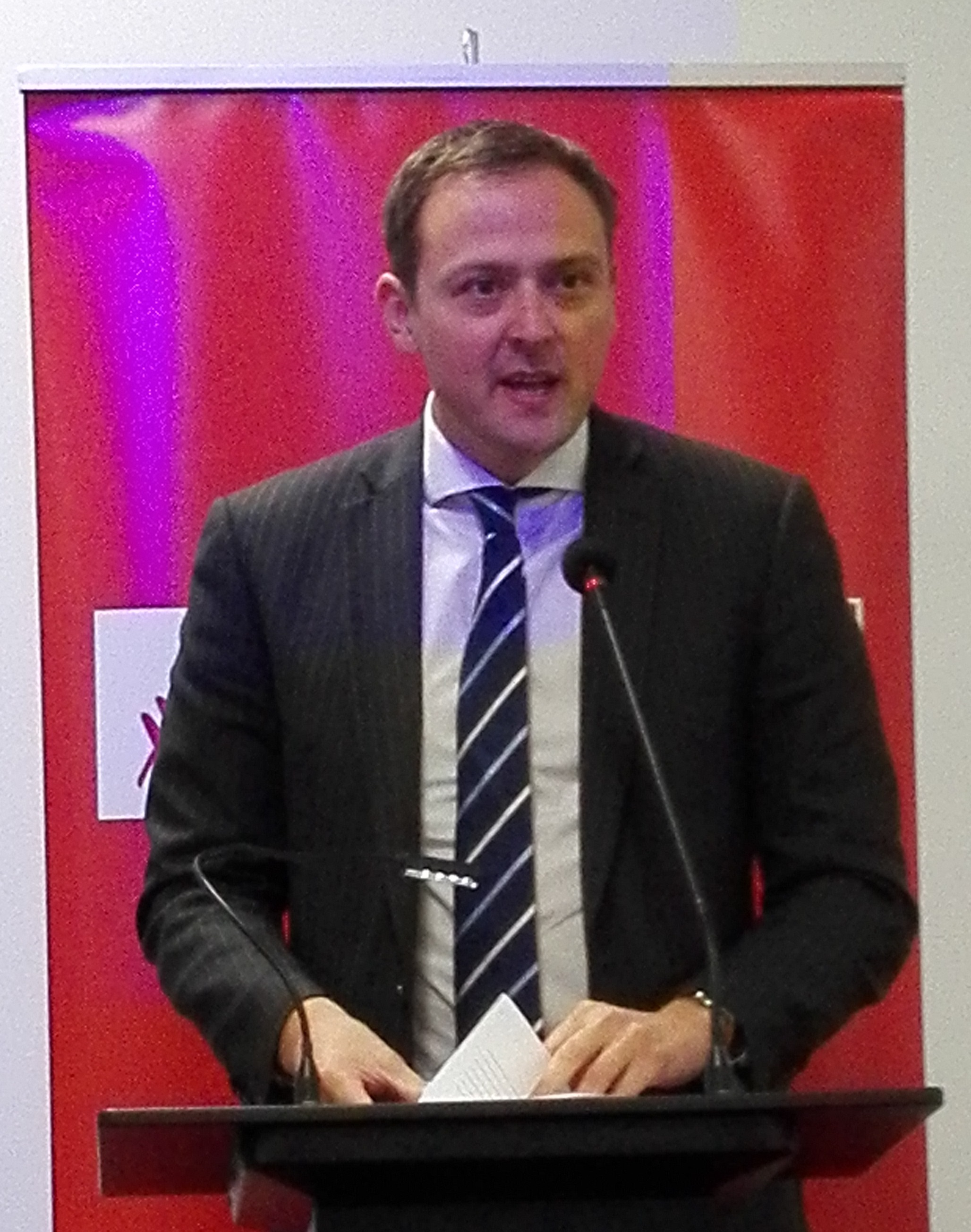
- Kirton speaking in 2017

Chief of Staff to the Prime Minister of New Zealand
- In office 8 February 2023 – 27 November 2023
- Prime Minister: Chris Hipkins
- Deputy: Holly Donald
- Preceded by: Raj Nahna

15th General Secretary of the New Zealand Labour Party
- In office 15 January 2016 – 10 August 2018
- Leader: Andrew Little; Jacinda Ardern
- Preceded by: Tim Barnett
- Succeeded by: Andre Anderson

Personal details
- Born: Taumarunui, New Zealand
- Party: Labour
- Spouse: Camilla Belich
- Relations: Neil Kirton (uncle)
- Children: Three
- Education: Lincoln University

Andrew Kirton is a New Zealand business executive, lobbyist and politician. He was general secretary of the New Zealand Labour Party from 2016 to 2018, campaign manager for the Labour Party in the 2017 general election, and chief of staff to prime minister Chris Hipkins in 2023.

== Early life and family ==
Kirton was born and raised in Taumarunui. He grew up in a Catholic household as one of four children on a dairy farm where his political beliefs were spurred after the value of the farm was halved and farming subsidies were abolished as part of the Rogernomics reforms. His father, Weston Kirton, served two terms as mayor of Ruapehu District from 1995 to 2001 and ran unsuccessfully as the National Party candidate in Taupo in both the 2002 and 2005 elections. An uncle, Neil Kirton, was a member of Parliament for New Zealand First (later independent) from 1996 to 1999.

Kirton boarded at Sacred Heart College in Auckland before studying at Lincoln University, where he earned a bachelor of commerce and management. Later, he undertook further study at the London School of Economics. He was active in student politics and co-chaired the New Zealand University Students' Association in 2004 with future Wellington City Councillor Fleur Fitzsimons and in 2005 with future Labour MP Camila Belich. Kirton and Belich later married and have three children.

== Career ==
Kirton worked as a communications advisor to junior minister Winnie Laban and prime minister Helen Clark in the final term of the Fifth Labour Government and moved to the United Kingdom when the government was defeated in 2008. After studying politics and government at the London School of Economics, Kirton was head of public affairs for Heathrow Airport before joining international construction company, Mace Group, leading their global corporate affairs division.

In January 2016, he returned to New Zealand to succeed Tim Barnett as general secretary of the Labour Party. He was also the Labour Party's campaign manager for the 2017 general election. Kirton said he was unsuccessfully "warned off" from working for the party by senior left-wing figures including Heather Simpson and Helen Kelly due to the Labour Party's poor showing in political opinion polls at that time. Regardless, after the installation of Jacinda Ardern as party leader in August 2017, the party was successful in forming a new government after the September 2017 election. Kirton was credited with setting up revitalised fundraising and volunteering infrastructure.

In February 2018, Newsroom reported four allegations of indecent assault by a single perpetrator during a Labour Party youth camp. The party later released a statement apologising for its handling of the situation.

When asked in 2017 if he held aspirations on entering Parliament himself, Kirton did not rule out running one day, but expressed a desire to work in the private sector again first. In June 2018 Kirton announced he was stepping down as Labour general secretary after accepting a job with Air New Zealand as their head of government and industry affairs and, after a July 2019 restructure, head of corporate affairs. He worked under chief executive Christopher Luxon, a future National Party prime minister. After leaving Air New Zealand in 2021, Kirton worked as a lobbyist.

In February 2023, the new prime minister Chris Hipkins appointed Kirton as his chief of staff, replacing Raj Nahna. He began the role on 8 February 2023. Hipkins was criticised by RNZ journalist Guyon Espiner for appointing a lobbyist as his chief of staff. After Labour lost the election, Kirton continued as Hipkins' chief of staff during the post-election caretaker period but decided not to follow Hipkins into Opposition. Kirton was succeeded as chief of staff by Chris Bramwell.

Party political offices
Preceded by Tim Barnett	General Secretary of the Labour Party; 2016–2018	Succeeded by Andre Anderson
