= Canta (magazine) =

Magazine of the University of Canterbury Students' Association

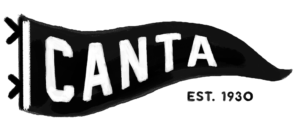

- Cover of Canta magazine 16 July 2014
- Managing editor: Maddy Croad
- Print editor: Hariklia Nicola
- Digital editor: Imy Rice
- Audio editor: Swarit Chauhan
- News editor: Matteo Zhang
- Frequency: Fortnightly during term time
- Founded: 1930
- Company: University of Canterbury Students' Association
- Based in: Christchurch, New Zealand
- Website: canta.co.nz

Canta (stylised CANTA) is the official magazine of the University of Canterbury Students' Association (UCSA) of the University of Canterbury, established in 1930.

The magazine generally features a light-hearted tone, with an emphasis on short, image-heavy articles.

Canta is a member of the Aotearoa Student Press Association (ASPA) and the New Zealand Press Council.

A full run of CANTA is held at the Macmillan Brown Library and is freely available in electronic form on the UC in Print site of UC Library. Some copies are also archived and freely available in electronic form on the website of the National Library of New Zealand.

== Publication information ==
Canta is freely available around The University of Canterbury campus every second Monday in term time. It is 48 pages long. The Managing Editor is Liam Donnelly and Print Editor is Liam Stretch. There are over 60 regular contributors.

There are a variety of sections which typically appear in every issue. These include:

- Campus News (including Fake News)
- The President's Piece
- Comedian's Corner
- Flat Famous
- Gig Guide
- Lucky Dip (blind date)
- Time Capsule
- Horoscopes
- A recipe

== Historical columns ==
- An Open Letter – Ben Uffindell
- The Cake Review – Dr. Handsome B. Wonderful Esq.
- Problem Solved – David Palmer
- Ye Olde Pub – Pot Belly Hayden
- The Challenge of "Yes" – Dani, The Yes Guru
- The UNInformant – Reuben VM
- Letters to the Editor – Various
- UC Kai – Annabel Longbean
- Sudoku
- Getting Inside the Queen's Legs – Andy Luck
- Sustainability – Sharon McIver
- The Inquisition – Various
- Exclusive Deals – Liquorland

== Controversy ==
In 1996, the Canta editors Steven Fleming and Creon Upton were removed after publishing a range of controversial articles including a Mel Brooks Nazi parody, a column purporting to have been written by Michael Jackson, a mock Tintin comic strip, and a list of student criminal offenders (a hoax). The editors claimed at the time that their sacking was more a result of their poor relationship with the university's student executive council than anything else. An employment tribunal later found in favour of the sacked editors resulting in a substantial payout from the student executive.

Canta was again involved in controversy following the publishing of an article entitled "The Completely Unofficial Top 13 Ways of Cheating" in the issue preceding midterm exams in June 2007. New Zealand newspaper The Press and internet news service Stuff published an article which was reported on by 3 News. The university announced it was introducing a random seating policy in exams following the attention. Canterbury University Students' Association president Belinda Bundy said the article was not meant to be taken seriously. "I think we only ever saw it as a humorous thing, It was just a light-hearted reaction to all the cheating issues that have been raised recently."

In 2008, a weekly column entitled "Trust Deborah – She's Always Right" surfaced. This column features a weekly rant against different groups of people, ranging from "fat" girls (females with a BMI>22, according to the column writer) and Christians. In issue 21 of 2008, Deborah again made headlines by suggesting that Christians "have the mental capacity of a Down's syndrome-sufferer with a head injury", are "mentally defective" and declaring that she wishes that all Christians would die. Her articles have generated considerable "Hate Mail", published in every issue of 2009. This has had little effect on changing Canta Magazine policy.

In late 2015, the magazine underwent a restructuring after an article on virtual rape entitled "The Epidemic of Virtual Butt-hurt" was published in March. Issues were recalled and a new editorial team independent of the UCSA was appointed in 2016. The first issue of 2016, under the new team, included a message stating: "Disclaimer: The opinions presented in this Canta magazine are not necessarily those held by the UCSA or this University. Canta is now independent of the UCSA and is run by a student-led team."

== See also ==
- List of print media in New Zealand
