= University of Canterbury Students' Association =

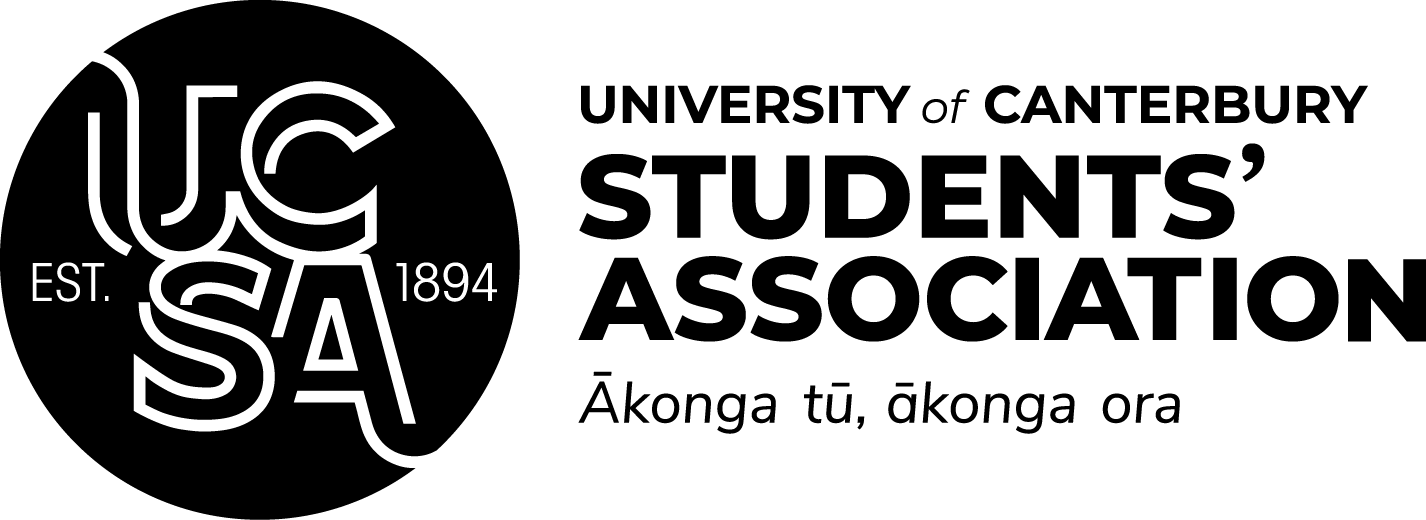
- Institution: University of Canterbury
- Location: Christchurch, Canterbury, New Zealand
- Established: 1894
- President: Tumaru Mataio
- Executive officers: Max Hodgson, Evangeline Rong, Tyrone Foster, Verna Manuel, Tarini Nallappan, Dominic Toli, Bec Connolly, Beatrix Gilling, Sunny Radzyner, Cathleen Wang, Corvin O'Rourke, Celine Sebastian, Charlee Cowey, Hana-Amaia Paratene
- Website: ucsa.org.nz

The University of Canterbury Students' Association (UCSA) is a student organisation associated with the University of Canterbury in New Zealand, established in 1894.

== Organisation ==
USCA is funded by students and is governed by a constitution through 14 elected representatives. Since its inception the association has grown into a diverse organisation with an annual turnover of around $20 million, approximately 20% of which is derived from student membership levies and a significant portion of the rest coming from the UCSA's commercial ventures.

The UCSA office was previously situated in the Puaka-James Hight Building following the 2011 Christchurch earthquake, after which the UCSA Building was deemed unsafe. The Undercroft was redeveloped as a student space. A new USCA building opened in July 2019.

The association provides services ranging from Early Learning Centres to an Advocacy and Welfare team through to student bars and cafes; from Student Job Search to places to spend free time by way of the 160+ clubs and societies.

The UCSA operates a number of other facilities spread around the campus including The Foundry and Bentleys Bar, cafes in Rātā | Engineering core (Nuts 'n' Bolts) and Puaka James Hight Library (Otto, Oishii, Food court, Cafe 1894, Chilton's) buildings. A second Early Learning Centre is situated on the corner of Montana & Ilam Roads.

Students can receive academic advice and support through the Education Team, and social comment and entertainment by way of UCSA's media: Canta magazine. The association also runs other events like Orientation Week, Winterlude and the End of Lectures Tea Party.

== Clubs ==
One of the many roles of the UCSA is to coordinate with Canterbury University clubs such as the Student Volunteer Army, UC Bike and ENSOC. The organization provides services such as advertising, facilities and grants to clubs.

== RDU ==
RDU 98.5FM is a student radio station operating from the University of Canterbury in New Zealand. It broadcasts on a frequency of 98.5 MHz and (since late 2006) through online streaming, but began on 23 February 1976 on 1413kHz, which is now occupied by Radio Ferrymead. In the early 1980s it was known as "Radio U". in 1986 the station converted to FM and changed its name to Radio UFM. Long running shows include Girl School, The Mixtape Sessions, The Joint, Guitar Media, Dollar Mix, Hauswerk and Vintage Cuts.

Wammo and Spanky became an infamous duo on the RDU Mornings show, most notably coaxing Don Brash into answering inappropriate love letters live on-air, and upsetting listeners by playing distasteful games poking fun at cancer victims. Wammo was scouted by Kiwi FM and was replaced by Kate Gorgeous, who hosted the show for a year until the end of 2007. After a long search for a new host, Spanky has returned to host the show solo under the new show title Breakfast with Spanky.

In 2007, the University of Canterbury Students' Association controversially agreed to sub-licence the RDU frequency to a newly formed company, RDU98.5FM Ltd and students against the sale selectively leaked information to The Press stating the station was sold for the price of $1. Actually the stations assets including broadcast equipment and transmitters were sold at market (book) value, a market level rental agreed for the space occupied and an annual licence fee agreed. Various arrangements were debated over the preceding three years following the previous limited liability company (controlled by minority shareholders) trading insolvently which forced UCSA to inject funds and restructure the organisation. After the 2011 Christchurch earthquake, the radio station lost its base at the University of Canterbury and for the next three years, it broadcast from a modified horse truck.

== Presidents ==
Tumaru Mataio is the UCSA President for 2026. Past UCSA Presidents include:

- 2026 — Tumaru Mataio
- 2025 — Luc MacKay
- 2024 — Luc MacKay
- 2023 — Pierce Crowley
- 2022 — Pierce Crowley
- 2021 — Kim Fowler
- 2020 — Tori McNoe
- 2019 — Sam Brosnahan
- 2018 — Josh Proctor
- 2017 — James Addington
- 2016 — James Addington
- 2015 — Sarah Platt
- 2014 — Sarah Platt
- 2013 — Erin Jackson
- 2012 — Erin Jackson
- 2011 — Kohan McNabb
- 2010 — Nicholas McDonnell
- 2009 — Steven Jukes
- 2008 — Michael Goldstein
- 2007 — Belinda Bundy
- 2006 — Warren Poh
- 2005 — George Hampton
- 2004 — Jane Chirnside (Until July), Peter Martin (From July)
- 2003 — Richard Neal
- 2002 — Richard Neal
- 2001 — Jarrod Gilbert
- 2000 — Jarrod Gilbert
- 1999 — Darel Hall
- 1998 — Darel Hall
- 1997 — Tiffany Page
- 1996 — Rebecca Johnston
- 1995 — Warrick Brown
- 1994 — Christina E. Rizos
- 1993 — John Wadsworth
- 1992 — Joan Smith
- 1991 — Bastiaan (Baz) Star
- 1990 — Chris Whelan
- 1989 — Suze E. Wilson
- 1988 — Samuel R. Fisher
- 1987 — Peter Fenton
- 1986 — Donovan Wearing
- 1985 — Donovan Wearing
- 1984 — Janine Morrell-Gunn
- 1983 — Anthony (Tony) Gray
- 1982 — Steve Ferguson
- 1981 — Katrina Amos
- 1980 — Anthony J. Stuart
- 1979 — Anthony J. Stuart
- 1978 — Michael Lee
- 1977 — P. Nigel W. Petrie/Marie O'Sullivan
- 1976 — Phillip J. Saxby
- 1975 — Peter Dunne
- 1974 — James Benefield
- 1973 — Robin Duff
- 1972 — James Crichton
- 1971 — David Caygill
- 1970 — David Cuthbert
- 1969 — Paul Grocott
- 1968 — Peter Nathan
- 1967 — Timothy Armitage
- 1966 — John C. Anderson
- 1965 — David W. Botherway
- 1964 — William S. Wakelin
- 1963 — Neil D. Thompson
- 1962 — Bruce Ullrich
- 1961 — Anthony D. L. Hooper
- 1960 — H. Adrian Brokking

== See also ==
- Tertiary education in New Zealand
- List of New Zealand tertiary students' associations
