= New Zealand Union of Students' Associations =

- Motto: The voice of New Zealand's 400,000 students
- Location: Wellington, New Zealand
- Established: 1929
- Abolished: 2024

The New Zealand Union of Students' Associations (NZUSA) was a representative body that advocated for the interests of tertiary students in New Zealand. Between 1935 and 2006, it was known as the New Zealand University Students' Association, until it merged with the national polytechnic students' association.

The association ceased operating in 2024. A successor, the Aotearoa Tertiary Students' Association, was established by the students associations from seven of eight New Zealand universities.

== History ==
The organisation was founded in 1929 as the New Zealand National Union of Students, and initially focussed its activities on sporting and social concerns. It changed its name to the New Zealand University Students' Association in 1935, and over time gave greater focus to issues concerning student welfare, such as student access to healthcare. It developed a strong involvement in social issues during the 1960s and 1970s, opposing the Vietnam War, apartheid, and racial immigration policies, as well as supporting homosexual law reform.

The association had a long history of advocating for its members by opposing New Zealand Government policies it viewed as not in the interests of students. During the 1990s and 2000s the New Zealand government and New Zealand universities made large increases in fees for students, and limited access to allowances for study. These changes attracted much criticism from the NZUSA. In the 2005 New Zealand general election the organisation strongly advocated in favour of policies it long held. These include reduction of student debt, and universal access to student allowances for full-time students. Such policy was supported by many minor parties, including the Greens, New Zealand First and United Future. The Fifth Labour Government introduced 0% interest on student loans policy, but the organisation continued to campaign against decreasing access to student allowances and systemic fee increases.

NZUSA campaigned against the introduction of voluntary student membership (VSM), arguing that students did support compulsory membership of students' associations. NZUSA proposed a policy compromise, suggesting a "KiwiSaver style" opt-out arrangement where students would be members unless they explicitly said they did not want to be. Although NZUSA had campaigned against VSM for fifteen years, in 2012 all students' associations were required to be voluntary.

=== NZUSA after Voluntary Student Membership ===
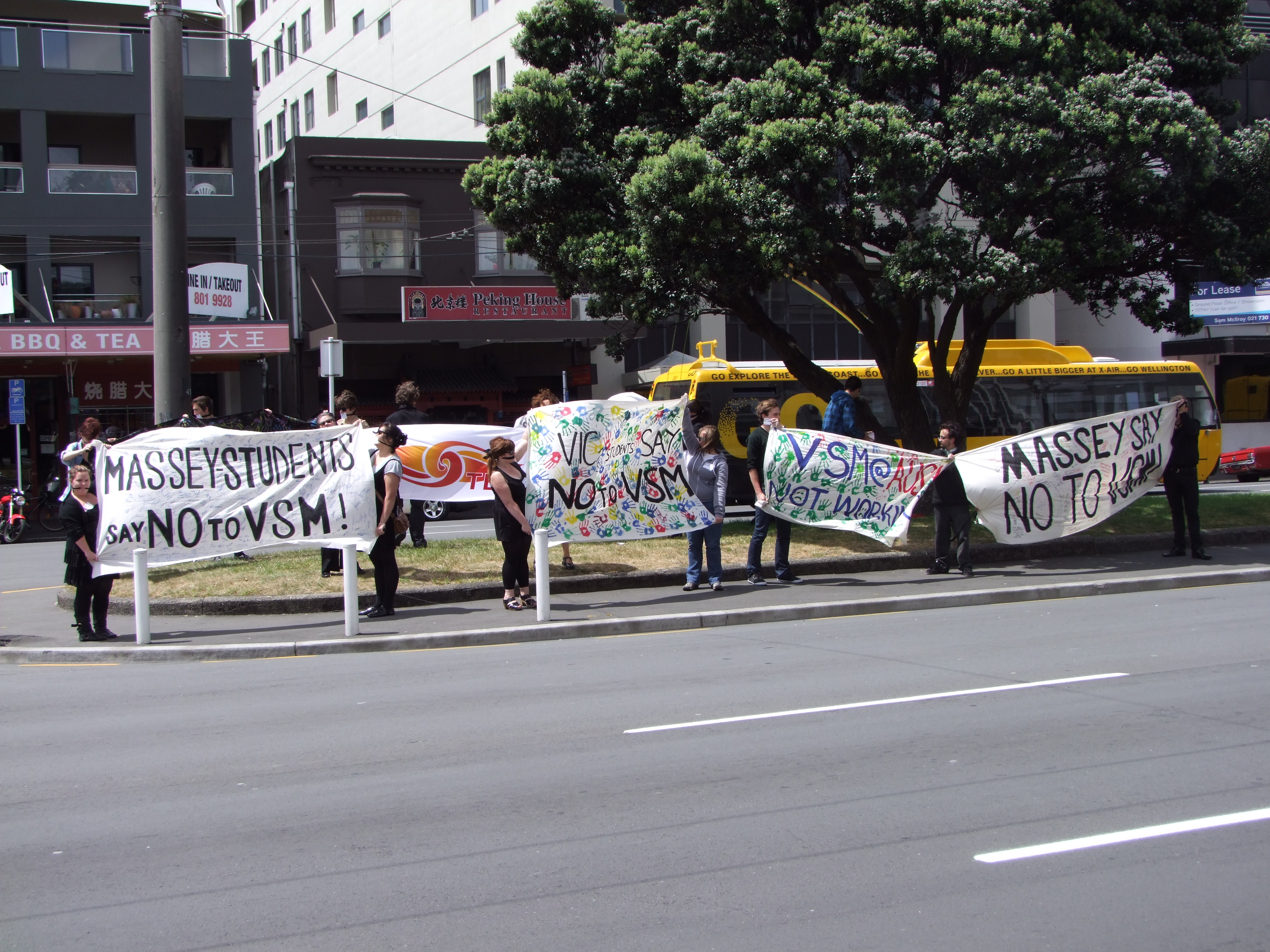
A protest against Voluntary Student Membership in Wellington in December 2010

Since the introduction of voluntary student membership (VSM) in 2012, NZUSA had faced significant challenges. VSM led to the organisation no longer being guaranteed a revenue stream from member associations, and by 2012 its funding had decreased by a third as members cut their contributions due to financial hardship.

==== Withdrawal of association memberships ====
In August 2013, Waikato Students' Union announced that it would "temporarily withdraw" from NZUSA. In response, Auckland University Students' Association (AUSA), Victoria University of Wellington Students' Association (VUWSA) Otago University Students' Association (OUSA) put out a press release calling for significant reforms of NZUSA.

Subsequently referendums were held at OUSA and VUWSA as to whether they should stay members of the national union. The membership of both associations voted to stay part of the organisation, but the presidents at the respective organisations had promised substantial reforms.

In September 2014, VUWSA President Sonya Clark announced that after a unanimous vote by the executive, VUWSA would be withdrawing from the organisation (and had given its obligatory one-year notice of withdrawal). At the time, Clark stated the reason for withdrawing was because students had given VUWSA "the mandate to stay if there were significant reforms. There haven’t been."

OUSA followed with an announcement in November 2014 that they would also be withdrawing from NZUSA, citing concerns around the value for money of their membership. 2014 NZUSA President Daniel Haines criticised OUSA for a lack of communication over their concerns.

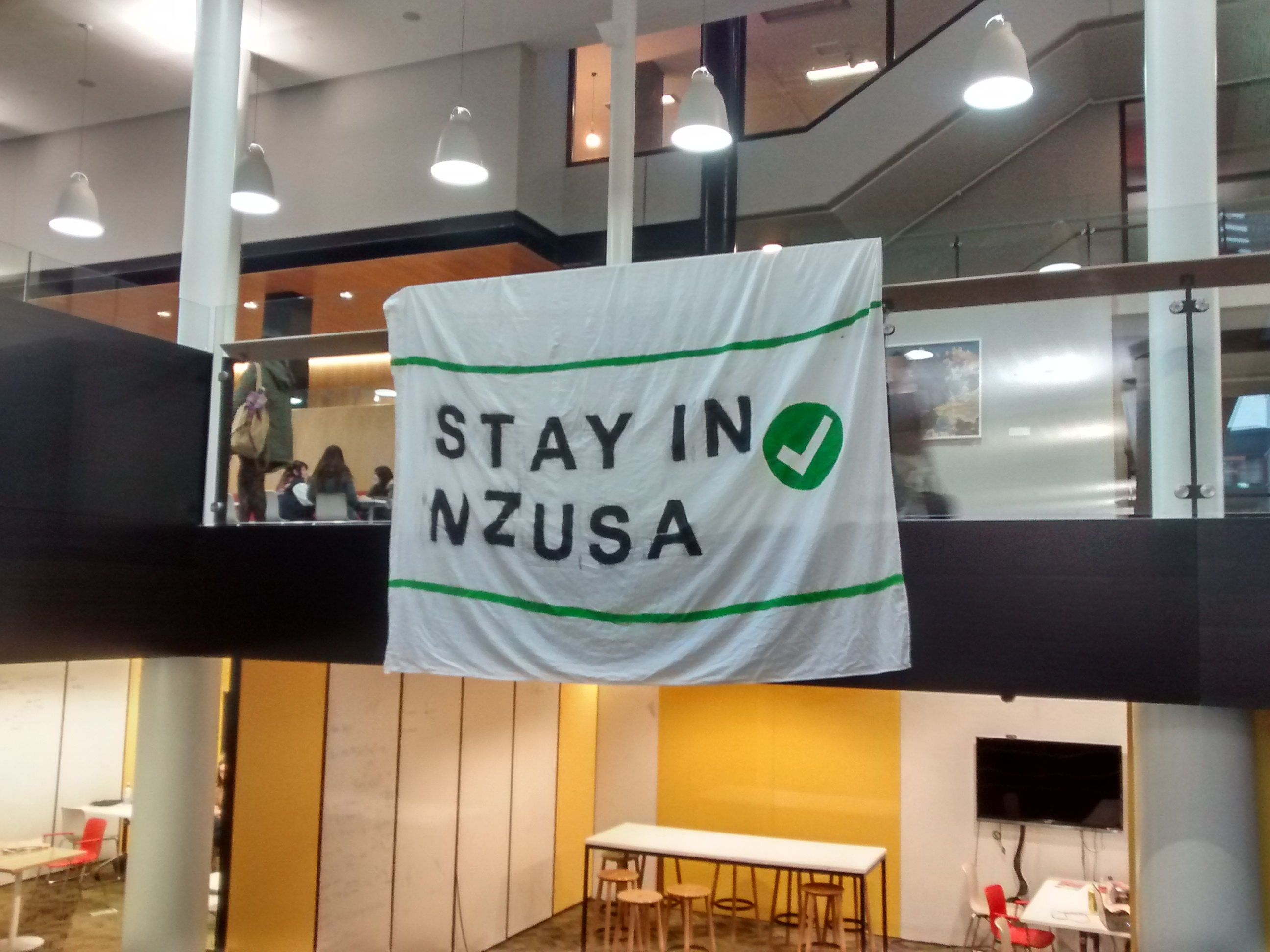
A student elections banner at VUW in September 2015. The banner asks voters to vote in the upcoming referendum to stay in NZUSA.

In June 2015, after refusing for a number of months to pay its NZUSA membership fees, VUWSA agreed to pay its outstanding fees. (NZUSA argued that membership fees were still payable because VUWSA was in the 12-months-long withdrawal period.) The reversal came after 2015 NZUSA President Rory McCourt had waged a public campaign to get VUWSA to both reconsider its withdrawal from NZUSA and also to pay the fees outstanding.

Victoria University students voted in late 2015 in a referendum to have VUWSA rejoin the national union.

Albany Students' Association withdrew in 2020, followed by AUSA in 2021.

In 2022, VUWSA again voted to leave NZUSA, but remained a member after their 12-month withdrawal notice period had passed. VUWSA ultimately announced they were leaving with immediate effect on 1 August 2024.

==== Sexual Harassment Scandal ====
In August 2017, it was announced that ACC were funding NZUSA to run a new sexual violence prevention programme. The contract from ACC doubled NZUSA's financial capacity, by adding $1.4 million in funding over three years. As part of the partnership, NZUSA hired 13 students as "field reporters" to help run the nationwide Thursdays in Black campaign.

In December 2017, three members of the sexual violence prevention team resigned after they alleged to have received multiple "dick pics" from a senior NZUSA staff member.

Following an investigation, ACC and NZUSA agreed to suspend the contract in January 2018, and the 13 field reporter positions were made redundant. The subsequent loss of the $1.4 million in funding put further strain on NZUSA's finances.

==== Ongoing Financial Issues ====
In February 2018, Executive Director of NZUSA Alistair Shaw resigned. Paying out the significant amounts of leave entitlements accrued by Shaw left NZUSA in a "precarious" financial position, as his resignation was "not foreseen when creating the [2018 budget]."

In May 2018, NZUSA asked its member associations to pay half of their 2019 membership fees in advance in order to keep the association running.

In July 2018, the association requested donations from NZUSA alumni, stating in an email campaign that the association was at a "financial and political cross-road". The association also looked into liquidating their assets, including selling their central Wellington office space.

By 2024, Critic Te Ārohi reported that NZUSA was in "financial dire straits", citing publicly available financial statements from October 2023 that showed NZUSA owed $79,048.20 in unpaid GST, and was "trading at a loss of just over $84k", whilst Salient claimed that "growing financial and structural troubles" had pushed NZUSA into "irrelevance and crushing debt."

== Disestablishment ==
In January 2024, the sitting National President Ellen Dixon and co-Vice President Tangihaere Gardiner called off the elections to find their successors, alleging that the process had been "messed up by others"; following the cancellation, Dixon and Gardiner both publicly resigned later that month. Both roles remained vacant for the year.

By this stage, only four (out of eight) university associations remained in NZUSA. On 1 August 2024, VUWSA announced they had officially withdrawn from NZUSA with immediate effect, due to "significant financial risks and liabilities associated with our continued membership." The remaining members moved to wind up NZUSA and begin liquidation proceedings.

In 2025, a new replacement national body, the Aotearoa Tertiary Students' Association (ATSA) was announced. Unlike NZUSA, ATSA's membership includes almost all university students' associations; only UCSA (who were also not NZUSA members) are not a member.

== Members ==
- ASA - Albany Students' Association (until 2021)
- AUSA - Auckland University Students' Association (until 2021)
- SAWIT - Students' Association of Waikato Institute of Technology
- Younited - Eastern Institute of Technology Students' Association
- VUWSA - Victoria University of Wellington Students' Association (until 2024)
- MUSA - Massey University Students' Association
- USC - Unitec Student Council
- SAU - Students’ Association of UCOL
- Weltec & Whitireia Student Council
- MAWSA - Massey Wellington Students' Association
- LUSA - Lincoln University Students' Association
- OUSA - Otago University Students' Association
- M@D - Massey at Distance
- WSU - Waikato Student Union (until 2013)

== Structure ==
=== List of association presidents, co-presidents, and vice-presidents ===
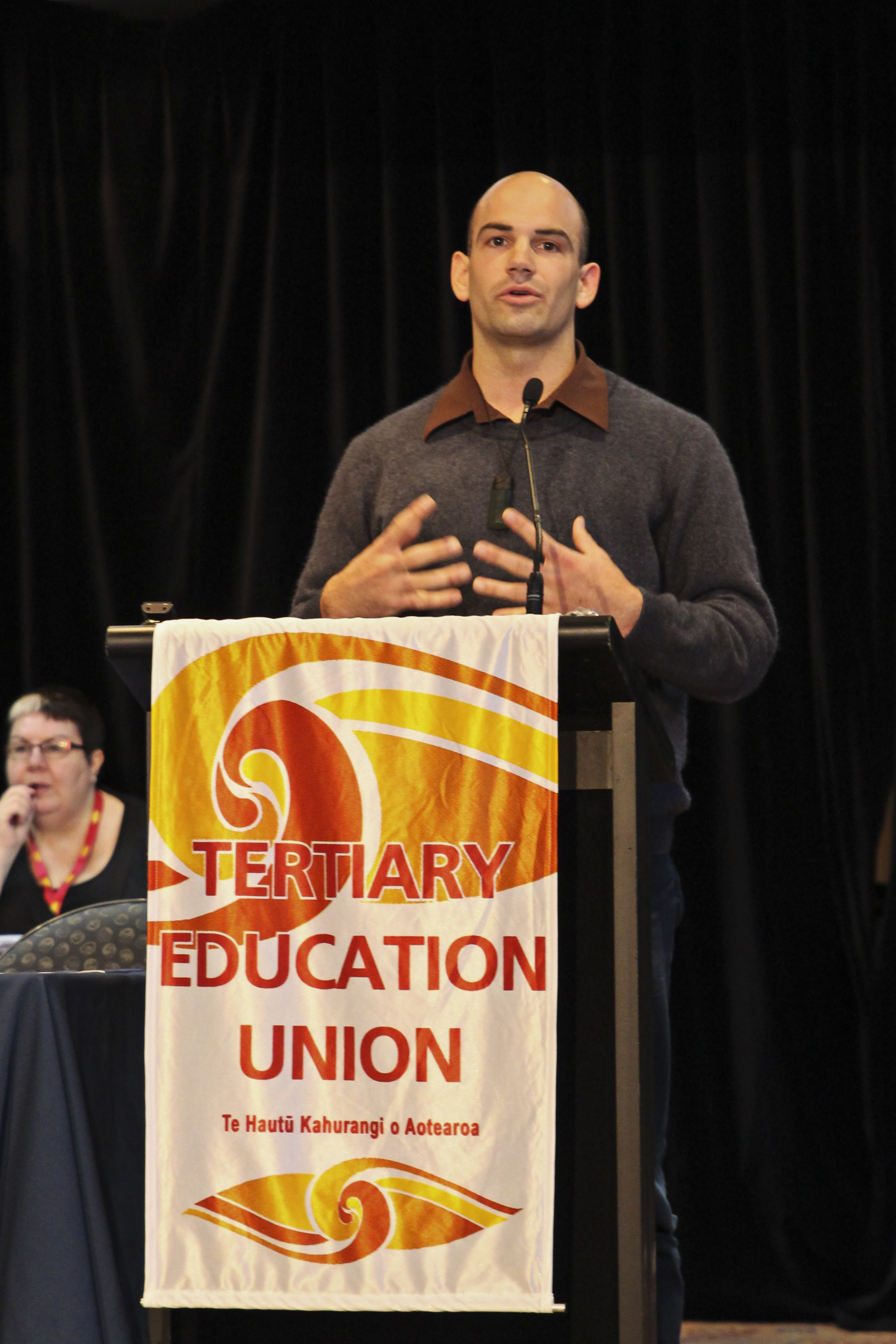
2012–2013 President Pete Hodkinson speaking at TEU event in 2013

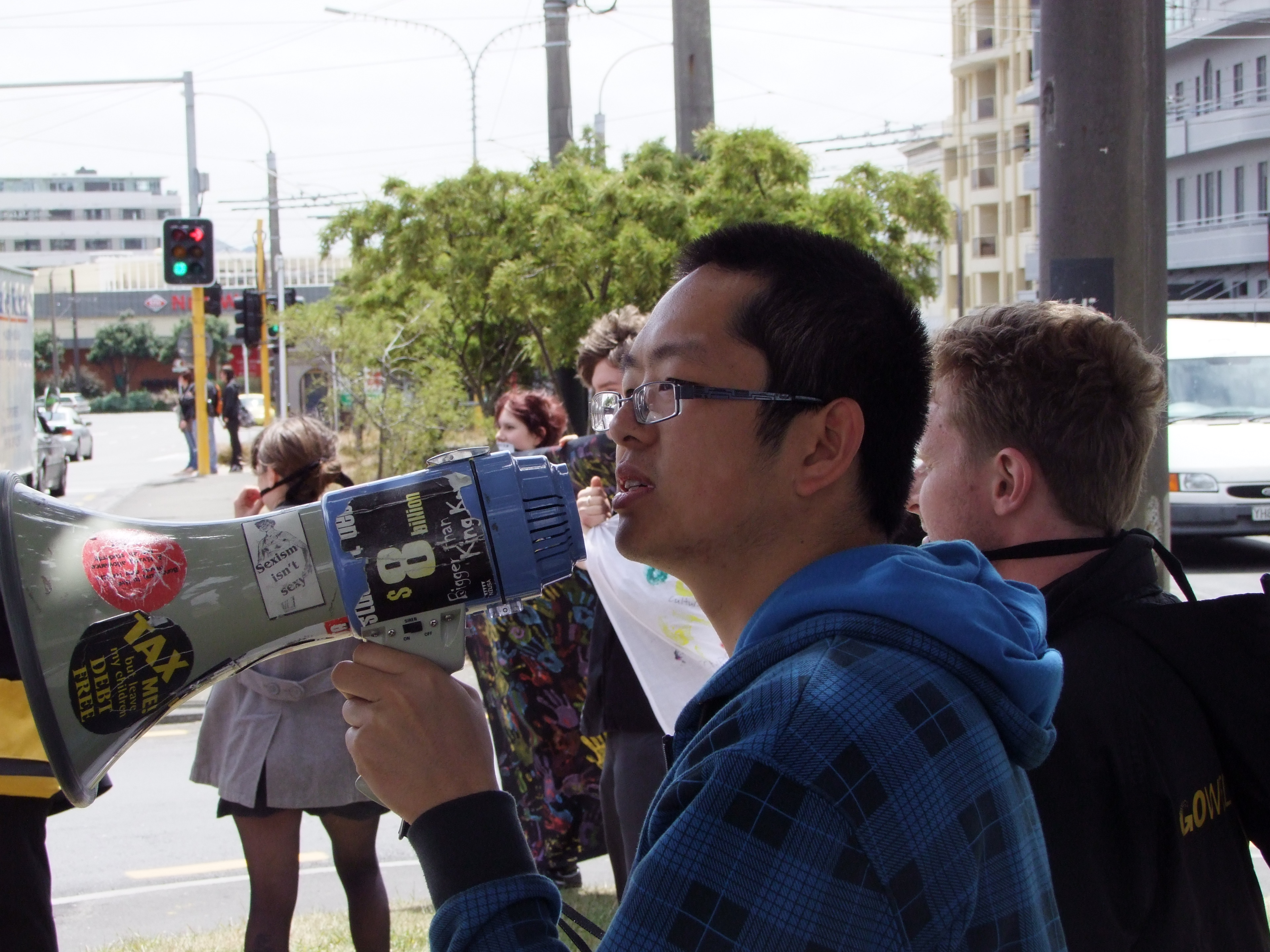
2010–2011 Co-president David Do speaking at a protest in 2010

- 1929 – P. S. de Q. Cabot
- 1930 – P. S. de Q. Cabot and W. J. Mountjoy
- 1931 – W. J. Mountjoy and E. D. Robinson
- 1932 – E. D. Robins and M. G. Sullivan
- 1933 – M. G. Sullivan and J. G. D. Ward
- 1934 – J. G. D. Ward and M. Joel
- 1935 – M. Joel, D. M. Burns and R. J. Larkin
- 1936 – R. J. Larkin and R. M. Young
- 1937 – R. M. Young and A. P. Blair
- 1938 – A. P. Blair
- 1939 – A. P. Blair and J. B. Almers
- 1940 – J. B. Almers and N. Begg
- 1941 – N. Begg and J. W. Mandeno
- 1942 – J. W. Mandeno and N. V. Ryder
- 1943 – N. V. Ryder and J. B. C. Taylor
- 1944 – J. B. C. Taylor
- 1945 – J. B. C. Taylor
- 1946 – M. C. Scott (nee Boxer)
- 1947 – M. C. Scott and H. B. Lawry
- 1948 – H. B. Lawry and N. R. Taylor
- 1949 – N. R. Taylor and R. B. Miller
- 1950 – R. B. Miller and K. B. O’Brien
- 1951 – K. B. O’Brien and I. T. Heath
- 1952 – I. T. Heath and R. S. Milne
- 1953 – R. S. Milne and M. J. O’Brien
- 1954 – M. J. O’Brien and E. A. Ireland
- 1955 – E. R. Ireland and T. O. Fitzgibbon
- 1956 – T. O. Fitzgibbon and J. D. Dalgety
- 1957 – J. D. Dalgety
- 1958 – J. D. Dalgety and B. V. Galvin
- 1959 – B. V. Galvin
- 1960 – B. V. Galvin and E. A. Woodfield
- 1961 – E. A. Woodfield
- 1962 – E. A. Woodfield and A. T. Mitchell
- 1963 – A. T. Mitchell and M. J. Moriarty
- 1964 – M. J. Moriarty
- 1965 – M. J. Moriarty and Alister Taylor
- 1966 – Ross Mountain and Alister Taylor
- 1967 – Ross Mountain
- 1968 – John McGrath
- 1969 – Peter Rosier
- 1970 – Paul Grocott
- 1971 – David Cuthbert
- 1972 – David Cuthbert
- 1973 – Stephen Chan
- 1974 – James Crichton
- 1974 – Jim Crichton
- 1975 – Alick Shaw
- 1976 – John Blincoe
- 1977 – Lisa Sacksen
- 1978 – Lisa Sacksen
- 1979 – Chris Gosling
- 1980 – Simon Wilson
- 1981 – Deryck Shaw
- 1982 – Brian Small
- 1983 – Robin Arthur
- 1984 – Jess Wilson
- 1985 – Jess Wilson
- 1986 – Alex Lee/Bidge Smith
- 1987 – Bidge Smith
- 1988 – Andrew Little
- 1989 – Andrew Little
- 1990 – Suze Wilson
- 1991 – Charlotte Denny/Emma Reid
- 1992 – Dan Ormond
- 1993 – Kirsty Graham
- 1994 – Jeremy Baker
- 1995 – Paul Williams
- 1996 – Grant Robertson and Alayna Ashby
- 1997 – Michael Gibbs
- 1998 – Sarah Helm and Patrick Rooney
- 1999 – Karen Skinner and Tanja Schutz
- 2000 – Tanja Schutz and Sam Huggard
- 2001 – Sam Huggard and Andrew Campbell
- 2002 – Andrew Campbell and Charlie Chambers
- 2003 – Roz Connelly and Fleur Fitzsimons
- 2004 – Andrew Kirton and Fleur Fitzsimons
- 2005 – Andrew Kirton and Camilla Belich
- 2006 – Joey Randall and Connor Roberts
- 2007 – Joey Randall and Josh Clark
- 2008 – Liz Hawes and Paul Falloon
- 2009 – Jordan King and Sophia Blair
- 2010 – David Do and Pene Delaney
- 2011 – David Do and Max Hardy
- 2012 – Pete Hodkinson
- 2013 – Pete Hodkinson
- 2014 – Daniel Haines
- 2015 – Rory McCourt
- 2016 – Linsey Higgins
- 2017 – Jonathan Gee
- 2018 – Jonathan Gee
- 2019 – James Ranstead/Caitlin Barlow
- 2020 – Isabella Lenihan-Ikin
- 2021 – Andrew Lessells
- 2022 – Andrew Lessells
- 2023 – Ellen Dixon

=== Tertiary Women New Zealand ===
Tertiary Women New Zealand (TWNZ) is a sub-group of NZUSA, dedicated to advocacy on behalf of women in tertiary education across the country. It comes from a position that acknowledges the systematic oppression of women and also considers how this intersects with class, race, ethnicity, sexuality, and ability. TWNZ is composed of women's associations at tertiary institutions across the country.

== See also ==
- List of New Zealand tertiary students' associations
- Tertiary education in New Zealand
- Students' union
- Student voice
- Student activism
