= Fees Free =

New Zealand policy providing free tertiary education

Fees free is a policy which makes the last year of tertiary education free in New Zealand. It was introduced by the Sixth Labour Government in 2018 with the first rather than the last year being free. It was implemented to reduce debt of students. In January 2025, the Sixth National Government revised the policy to apply to the final year rather than the first. In May 2026 it was confirmed that the scheme would be scrapped in the upcoming 2026 budget.

== History ==
=== Sixth Labour Government, 2018–2023 ===
Fees free was introduced in 2018 by the sixth Labour Government. It was planned to increase the free period from one year to two years in 2020, and then three years in 2023, but this increase was cancelled in 2020 due to the COVID-19 pandemic. In the first year, 47 thousand students and trainees had their fees paid off.

Between 2017 and 2018, student debt decreased by $194.2 million. In 2019, the policy cost $254 million.

In 2020 research found that students that enrolled in tertiary education only because it was free achieved lower grades than those who had other reasons in studying. They were also more likely to consider dropping out.

The 2022 budget had $387 million allocated to fees free.

=== Sixth National Government, 2023–present ===
On 24 November 2023, the newly formed Sixth National Government announced that the Fees Free scheme would be shifted from the first to the final year of tertiary studies. By 16 January 2025, the National-led coalition government's Final year fees-free policy had been implemented. National Party MP for Bay of Plenty Tom Rutherford described the new policy as a "wise investment."

On 8 May 2026, New Zealand First leader Winston Peters and Finance Minister Nicola Willis confirmed that the fees-free schemewould be scrapped in the 2026 New Zealand budget.

== Criticism ==
In 2017, National Party education spokesman Paul Goldsmith criticised the policy by saying that the policy moves resources "to the sons and daughters of the richest New Zealanders, who will go on to earn high incomes and can easily contribute to the cost of their education". It has also been criticised by Penny Simmonds for similar reasons.

People have claimed that people who use the policy are more likely to be able to afford the education without fees free.
