= Tertiary education in New Zealand =

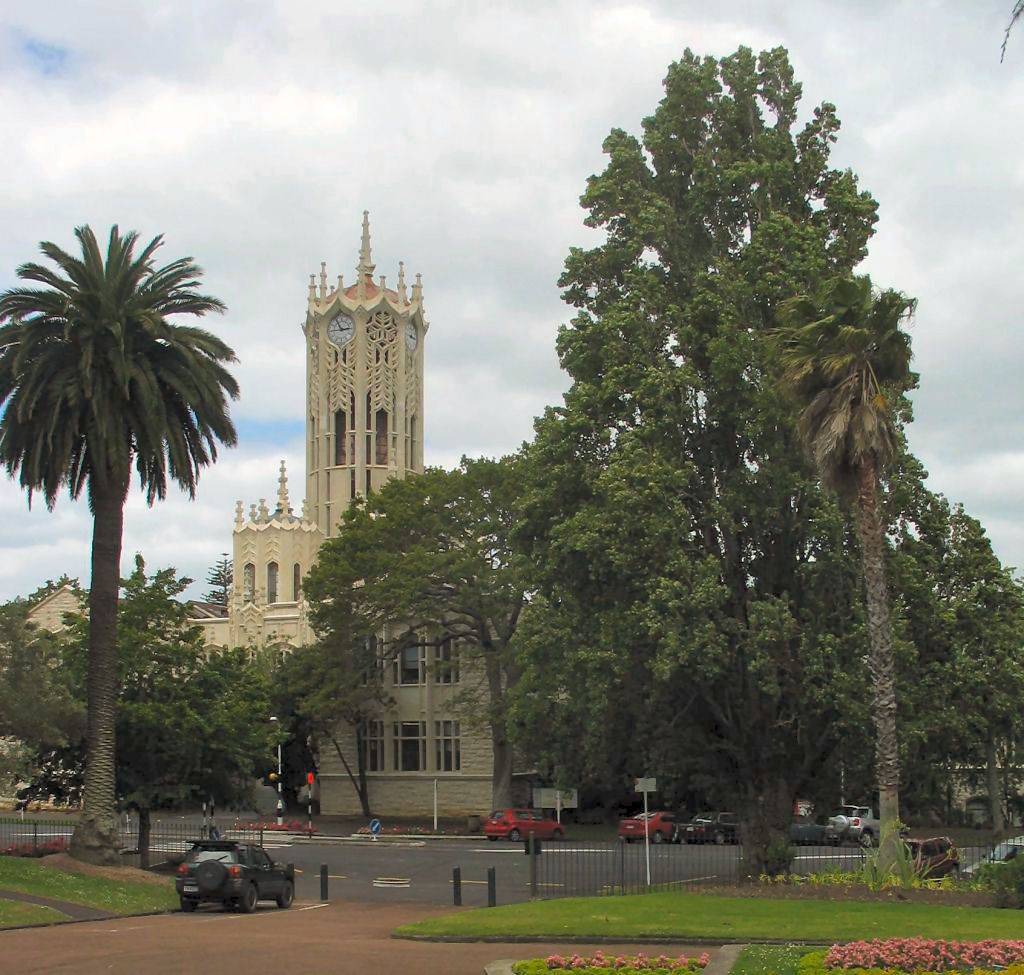
University of Auckland clock tower

Tertiary education in New Zealand is provided by universities, institutes of technology and polytechnics, private training establishments, industry training organisations, and wānanga (Māori education).

It ranges from informal non-assessed community courses in schools through to undergraduate degrees and research-based postgraduate degrees. All post-compulsory education is regulated within the New Zealand Qualifications Framework, a unified system of national qualifications for schools, vocational education and training, and 'higher' education. The New Zealand Qualifications Authority (NZQA) is responsible for quality assuring all courses and tertiary education organisations other than universities. Under the Education Act 1989, The Committee on University Academic Programmes (CUAP) and the Academic Quality Agency (AQA) have delegated authority for quality assurance of university education. The Tertiary Education Commission (TEC) is responsible for administering the funding of tertiary education, primarily through negotiated investment plans with each funded organisation.

Until 1961, all university education was organised under the University of New Zealand, with university colleges around the country. Eventually the colleges became degree-awarding universities in their own right.

== Oversight ==
The tertiary education sector in New Zealand comes under the oversight of the Tertiary Education Commission, a Crown entity tasked with implementing the Government's tertiary education policies within the framework of the Education Act 1989.

== Tertiary institutions ==
=== Universities ===
==== Qualifications ====
Typically, a bachelor's degree will take three years, and a further year of study will lead to an honours degree. Not every degree follows this 3+1 pattern: there are some four-year degrees (which may or may not be awarded with Honours), and some specialist bachelor's degrees which take longer to complete. Typically, Honours may be awarded with first class, upper second class, lower second class or third class, but this can vary from degree to degree. A bachelor's degree may be followed by a master's degree. A candidate who does not hold an Honours degree may be awarded a master's degree with honours: such a degree usually involves two years study, compared to one year for a master's degree for a candidate who does have an Honours degree. A candidate who has either a master's degree or a bachelor's degree with Honours may proceed to a doctoral degree.

==== Entry and fees ====
Entry to most universities was previously "open" to all who met the minimum requirements in school-leaving examinations (be it NCEA or Bursary). However, most courses at New Zealand universities now have selective admission, where candidates have to fulfill additional requirements through qualifications, with the University of Auckland offering the largest number of selective-entry courses. Mature students usually do not need to meet the academic criteria demanded of students who enter directly from secondary school.

Domestic students will pay fees subsidised by the Government, and the student-paid portion of the fee can be loaned from the Government under the Government's Student Loan Scheme. Weekly stipends can be drawn from the loan for living expenses, or the student can apply for a needs based (on assessment of parental income) "Student Allowance", which does not need to be paid back.

"Bonded Merit Scholarships" are also provided by the Government to cover the student-paid portion of fees. The New Zealand Scholarship is awarded to school leavers by a competitive examination and also provides financial support to school-leavers pursuing a university degree but does not entail any requirement to stay in the country after they finish university. International students pay full (non-subsidised) fees and are not eligible for Government financial assistance.

==== Institutions ====
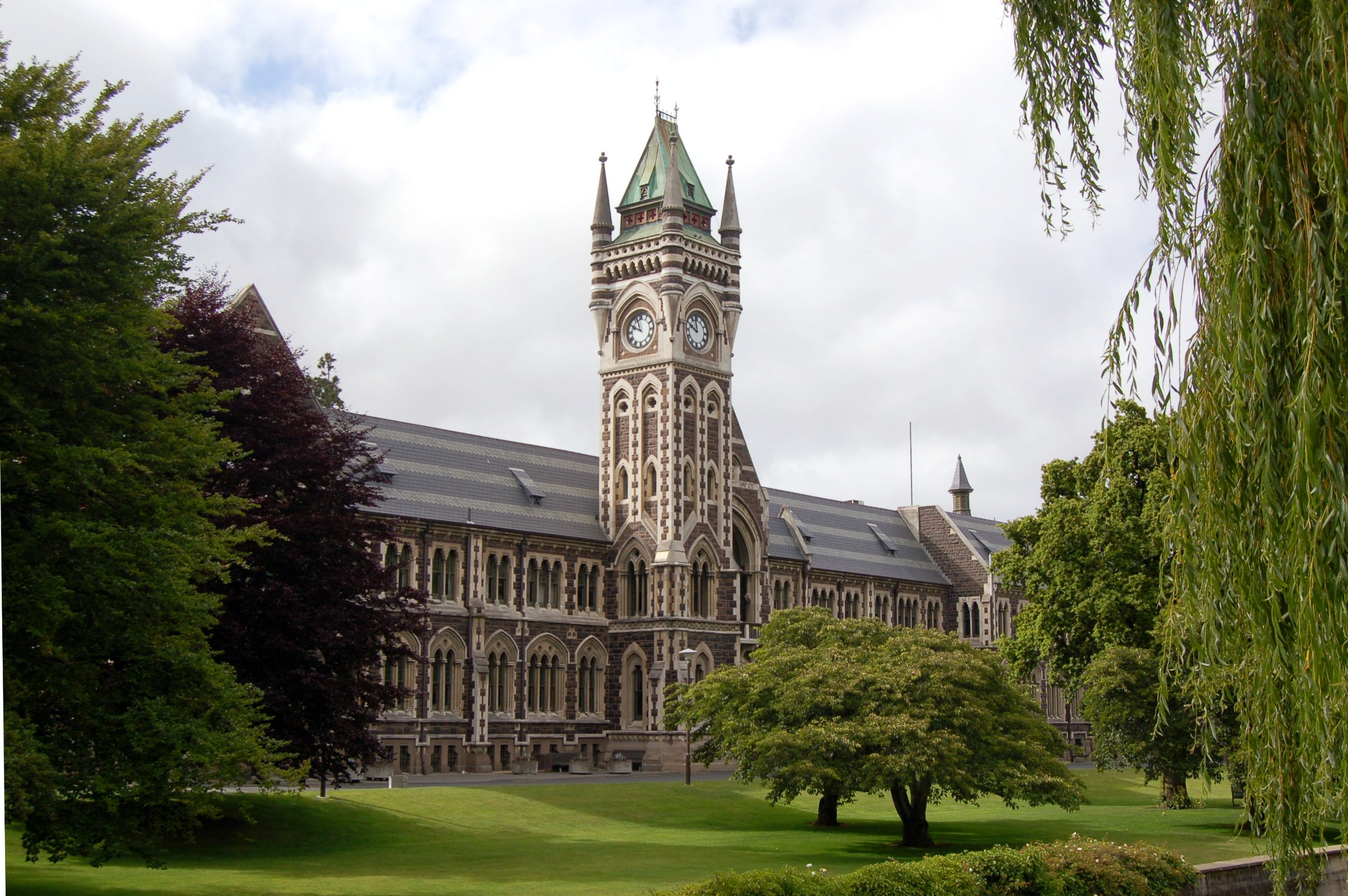
The University of Otago Registry Building (completed 1879)

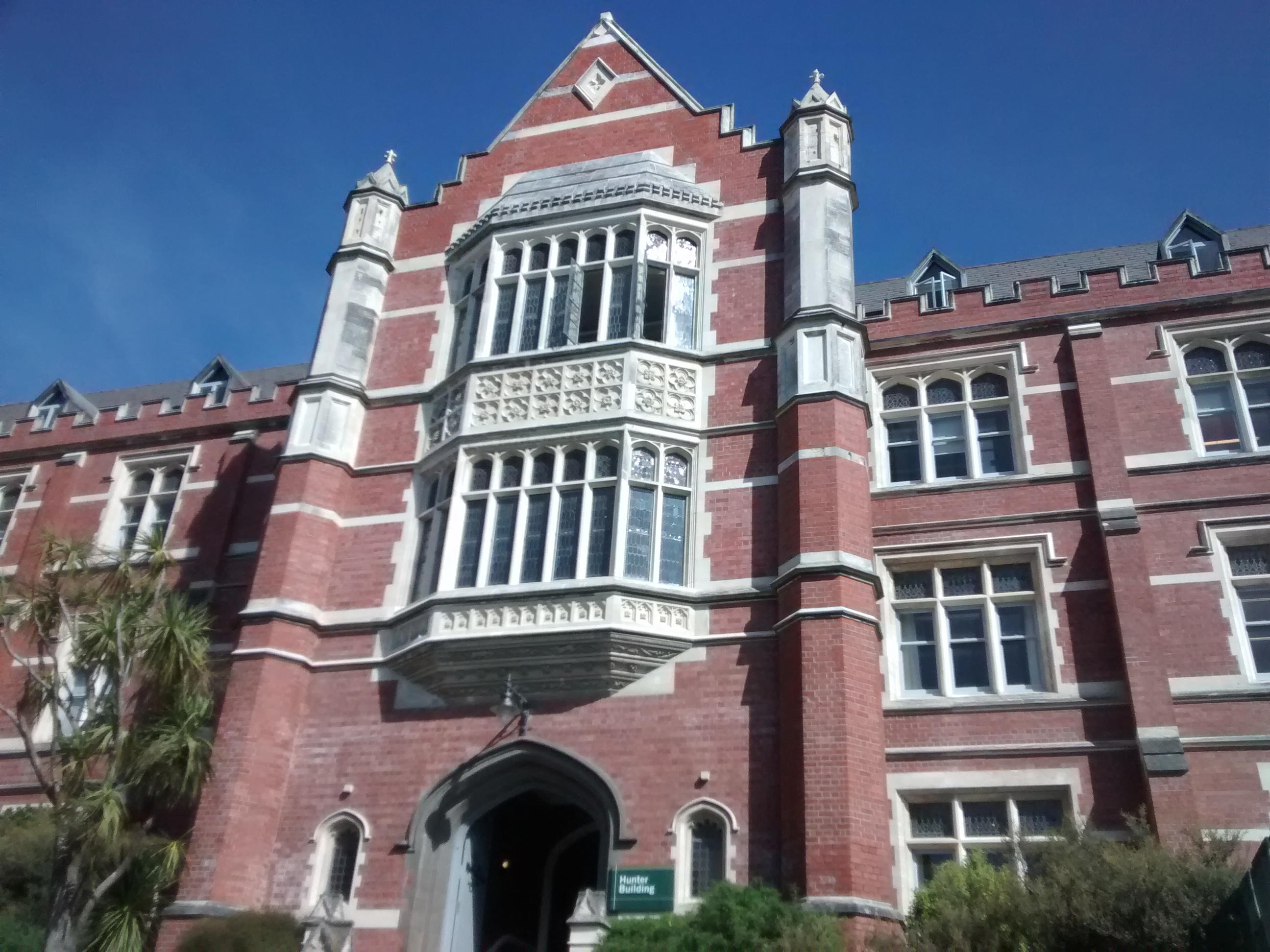
Victoria University of Wellington's Hunter Building (completed 1906)

The first university in New Zealand, the University of Otago, was founded in 1869. The next year, in 1870, the University of New Zealand was founded – the overarching university entity which eventually had a number of university colleges under it. The University of New Zealand was initially based in Wellington, but additionally opened Canterbury College in 1873, University of Otago came under its control in 1874, Auckland University College in 1883, and later Victoria University College in 1889.

The University of New Zealand system – where it was the only degree-granting university in New Zealand – lasted until 1961.

Now the colleges are independent universities in their own right, and since 1961 four new universities have been created: Auckland University of Technology, Lincoln University, Massey University and Waikato University.

The eight universities of New Zealand are:

- Auckland University of Technology (Auckland)
- Lincoln University (Lincoln)
- Massey University (Palmerston North, Auckland, Wellington)
- University of Auckland (Auckland)
- University of Canterbury (Christchurch)
- University of Otago (Dunedin)
- University of Waikato (Hamilton, Tauranga)
- Victoria University of Wellington (Wellington)

The overarching representative body for universities is Universities New Zealand, made up of the Vice-Chancellors of the respective institutions.

According to the Education Act 1989, universities have the following characteristics:

(i) they are primarily concerned with more advanced learning, the principal aim being to develop intellectual independence:
(ii) their research and teaching are closely interdependent and most of their teaching is done by people who are active in advancing knowledge:
(iii) they meet international standards of research and teaching:
(iv) they are a repository of knowledge and expertise:
(v) they accept a role as critic and conscience of society;...

— Education Act 1989, section 162(4)(a)

=== Colleges of education ===
The name 'College of Education' is protected by Act of Parliament. (Previously the name 'Teachers' College' was protected.) Only universities and standalone colleges of education may use this title. Thus, privately owned institutions that are not listed in Acts and that provide teacher education such as the Bethlehem Institute (Tauranga) and New Zealand Graduate School of Education (Christchurch) must use alternative names.

The first teachers' training college was established in Dunedin in 1876. After schooling for children aged between 7 and 13 years became compulsory in 1877, other training colleges were established in Christchurch (1877), Wellington (1880) and Auckland (1881). During the Long Depression of the 1880s and the Great Depression of the 1930s, these training colleges were closed and reopened due to government budgetary cuts and economic difficulties. All these colleges reopened in 1936. During the post-Second World War Baby Boom, new teacher training colleges were established in New Zealand's major centres and reached a peak of nine by 1964: Auckland (four), and one each in Hamilton, Palmerston North, Wellington, Christchurch, and Dunedin. The number of teacher trainees soared from 1,460 in 1940 to 7,779 by 1975.

During the 1960s, the Government granted more independence to teachers' training colleges, with governance being transferred from boards of education to college councils. As a result, teachers' colleges were able to manage their own staff recruitment and curriculum, but the Department of Education retained responsibility for policy development and student enrolment. From the late 1970s, teachers' colleges began offering joint programmes with the universities. During the 1980s, teachers' colleges were renamed "colleges of education" and expanded their programmes to include social work-training, advanced courses for trained teachers and professional development courses for other professions such as nursing.

During the 1980s, several colleges of education closed or merged due to a surplus of trained graduates and declining birth rates. Following the closure of the Ardmore college in 1974 and the North Shore college between 1981 and 1983, the Auckland Teachers College and Secondary Teachers College merged in 1986 to form the Auckland College of Education. By 2007, all the remaining colleges had merged with universities closely allied with them to become constituent teacher training facilities. In 1990 the Hamilton College of Education merged with the University of Waikato. This was followed by the Palmerston North College of Education, which merged with Massey University in 1996. Between 2004 and 2005, the Auckland and Wellington colleges merged with Auckland University and Victoria University respectively. In 2007, the Christchurch College of Education merged with the University of Canterbury. The remaining stand-alone college in Dunedin merged with the University of Otago in January 2007.

=== Institutes of technology and polytechnics ===
Institutes of technology and polytechnics (ITP) offer general technical and vocational education, as well as undertaking applied research. Most learners study vocational programmes at levels 1–6 of the NZQF, but following education reforms during the 1990s ITPs have been permitted to offer degree and postgraduate programmes, and are increasingly offering these programs, including a small number of doctorates. The vocational qualifications offered by ITPs are developed by industry training organisations, but they are free to set their own curricula and assessments. These are generally based on practical knowledge in a working environment, and learning may take place in classrooms, simulated work environments, external workplaces, or a combination of these. Certification upon graduation is industry-related and real work experiences are often part of the curriculum. The peak body for this sector is New Zealand Institutes of Technology and Polytechnics (NZITP) .

On 1 August 2019, the Education Minister Chris Hipkins announced that the Labour-led coalition government would merge all 16 institutes of technology and polytechnics (ITPs) into a single entity in April 2020 called Te Pūkenga, citing declining student numbers and better allocation of government resources. Polytechnics have been cautiously optimistic about the changes despite concerns about losing their autonomy to a national organisation. While Ara Institute of Canterbury chief executive Tony Gray and Otago Polytechnic chief executive Phil Ker have cautiously welcomed the changes, the opposition National Party's Education spokesperson Shane Reti and Southern Institute of Technology CEO Penny Simonds have opposed the merger, saying that it would lead to job losses.

Following the 2023 New Zealand general election, the National-led coalition government announced it would be dissolving Te Pūkenga with the goal of restoring the autonomy of the polytechnics. In July 2025, the Government was confirmed that Te Pūkenga would be replaced with 10 stand-alone polytechnics from 1 January 2026, and that Te Pūkenga would continue operating for another year until its disestablishment on 31 December 2026.

=== Wānanga ===
A wānanga is a publicly owned tertiary institution that provides education in a Māori cultural context. Section 162 of the Education Act 1989 (re-affirmed by the Waitangi Tribunal in 2005) specifies that wānanga resemble mainstream universities in many ways. As of 2009, wānanga offer certificates, diplomas, and bachelor-level degrees, with some wānanga providing programmes in specialised areas up to doctorate level.

Wānanga educational programmes are accredited through the New Zealand Qualifications Authority (NZQA) and the Ministry of Education, and are partly governed by New Zealand's Tertiary Education Commission (TEC).

In Maori tradition the word wānanga conveyed meanings related to highly evolved knowledge, lore, occult arts, and also "forum" in the sense of a discussion to arrive at deeper understanding.

There are three official wānanga: Te Wānanga o Raukawa, Te Whare Wānanga o Awanuiārangi and Te Wānanga o Aotearoa.

== Other tertiary education organisations ==
=== Private training establishments ===
Private training establishments (PTEs) are privately owned firms or NGOs that provide training, usually in a specific niche such as tourism, design or ICT. They also provide training to special needs groups or in time frames that support different learner needs, and a significant number offer English language teaching. Their tutors are generally drawn from industry rather than academia and the goal for most learners is to reach employment quickly. It has been argued that private trainers have the ability to respond quickly to the changing needs of industry. Most providers provide courses that are NZQA-accredited; these usually lead to certificates and diplomas, although a small number of PTEs also offer degrees. PTE programmes that are NZQA-approved receive government funding subsidies, and students in these programmes are able to access the public student financial support system. Private trainers offer an alternative to state schools and many learners prefer the supportive environment of most private trainers. Several peak bodies represent this sector, including Independent Tertiary Education New Zealand, Quality Tertiary Institutions, and English New Zealand.

=== Industry training organisations ===
Industry training organisations (ITOs) are established under the Industry Training and Apprenticeships Act 1992 to set skill standards and establish training arrangements for a given industry or set of related industries. To do this they develop and maintain competency-based Assessment Standards and qualifications related to their industry, and co-ordinate apprenticeships and other structured training for employees (which may involve on-job learning, off-job courses at another tertiary organisation, or a mix of both). This enables employees to gain a qualification from the New Zealand Qualifications Framework while being in a full-time job. From 2001 to 2014 they also had a formal role to provide skills leadership for their industry or industries, but this was removed by the National Government following a review of industry training ordered by then-Minister for Tertiary Education, Skills, and Employment Steven Joyce.

ITOs are the only organisations permitted to develop non-degree vocational qualifications, with a few specific exceptions in areas such as adult teaching. However, individual tertiary providers (including ITPs, PTEs, and wānanga) are able to develop their own programmes and curricula that lead toward those qualifications. Uniquely in comparison to similar bodies in other countries, such as the United Kingdom's Sector Skills Councils or Australia's Industry Skills Councils, ITOs work with individual firms and trainees to directly enrol learners and often manage assessments.

ITOs are owned by industries, recognised under statute, and receive funding from both government and industry. Rather than being established directly by government, they exist as independent organisations and must apply for recognition as an ITO from the Minister of Education; as part of this process they must demonstrate they have sufficient support from the industry for which they claim coverage. Each ITO has to regularly reapply for recognition, and industries can decide that their skill needs are best-served by joining with one or more other ITOs. This means that the number of industry training organisations can change over time, and has fluctuated from a high of 52 in 1996 to 11 in 2019. ITOs currently cover most of New Zealand's industries from traditional trades like building and plumbing, the primary industries, and manufacturing, through to retail, government, and community services. The Industry Training Federation represents ITOs.

On 1 August 2019, Education Minister Chris Hipkins announced that the Government would be replacing the eleven industrial training organisations with four to seven workforce development councils that would be set up by 2022 to influence vocational education and training. ITOs had opposed the Government's proposed merger, claiming that it would damage an already working system. Building and Construction Industry Training Organisation chief executive Warwick Quinn described the Government's decision as disappointing. Garry Fisseden, CEO of The Skills Organisation, also spoke out against the merger proposal, saying that ITOs played an essential role in bridging the communication gap between industry and learning organisations.

== Funding ==
Funding for tertiary education in New Zealand is through a combination of government subsidies and student fees. The government funds approved courses by a bulk grant (the Student Achievement Component) based on the number of enrolled students in each course and the amount of study time each course requires. Courses are rated on an equivalent full-time student (EFTS) basis. Specific funding for each individual organisation is negotiated with the Tertiary Education Commission and established through an Investment Plan that allocates funding over a rolling triennium. Students enrolled in NZQA-approved courses at providers can access student loans and student allowances to assist with fees and living costs.

Industry training is funded differently than other forms of tertiary education. A separate pool of funding – the Industry Training Fund – is used to support training and apprenticeships organised through ITOs, and this system is based on a Standard Training Measure (STM) rate that is considerably lower than per-EFTS rates for courses in the same field and at the same level. The difference in per-learner funding levels between provider-based and ITO-based tertiary education has been a considerable source of tension since the establishment of the industry training system. Apprentices and trainees learning through ITOs are unable to access student financial support (both allowances and loans), on the basis that they are full-time employees earning a wage or salary.

Funding for tertiary institutions has been criticised recently due to high fees and funding not keeping pace with costs or inflation. Some also point out that high fees are leading to skills shortages in New Zealand as high costs discourage participation and graduating students seek well paying jobs off shore to pay for their student loans debts. As a result, education funding has been undergoing an ongoing review in recent years.

=== Students ===
Most tertiary students rely on some form of state funding to pay for their tuition and living expenses. Mostly, students rely on state-provided student loans and allowances. Secondary school students sitting the state-run examinations are awarded scholarships, depending on their results, that assist in paying some tuition fees. Universities and other funders also provide scholarships or funding grants to promising students, though mostly at a postgraduate level. Some employers assist their employees to study (full-time or part-time) towards a qualification that is relevant to their work. People who receive state welfare benefits and are retraining, or returning to the workforce after raising children, may be eligible for supplementary assistance, however students already in full or part-time study are not eligible for most state welfare benefits.

Over the term of the fifth National Government (2008–2017), considerable changes were made to the tertiary education sector.

In 2017, following the election of the sixth Labour-led Government, Minister of Education Chris Hipkins introduced an entitlement of one year's fees-free tertiary education for all New Zealand school leavers. This entitlement applies to New Zealand citizens or permanent residents who have not yet undertaken post-compulsory education at Level 3 or above of the Qualifications Framework. It covers fees for any study at Level 3 or above, including apprenticeships, provider-based vocational education, or degree-level study; it does not contribute to living costs.

Student allowances, which are non-refundable grants to students of limited means, are means tested and the weekly amount granted depends on residential and citizenship qualifications, age, location, marital status, dependent children and personal, spousal or parental income. The allowance is intended for living expenses, so most students receiving an allowance will still need a student loan to pay for their tuition fees.

The Student Loan Scheme is available to all New Zealand citizens and permanent residents. It covers course fees, course-related expenses, and can also provide a weekly living allowance for full-time students. The loan must be repaid at a rate dependent on income and repayments are normally recovered via the income tax system by wage deductions. Low income earners and students in full-time study can have the interest on their loans written off.

On 26 July 2005, the Labour Party announced that they would abolish interest on student loans, if re-elected at the 2005 general election, which they were. From April 2006, the interest component on student loans was abolished for students who live in New Zealand. This has eased pressure on the government from current students. However, it has caused resentment from past students, many of whom have accumulated large interests amounts in the years 1992–2006. The National Party initially opposed the interest free loans policy, but after it lost the 2005 election, in early 2008 said it would keep interest off student loans.

The Fifth National Government kept interest off loans, but increased the repayment rate from 10 to 12 per cent and reduced eligibility for the loans.

== Unions and students' associations ==
=== Tertiary Education Union ===
The New Zealand Tertiary Education Union (TEU; in Maori: Te Hautū Kahurangi o Aotearoa) is the main union in the tertiary education sector, and represents the interests of more than 10,000 workers employed sector across New Zealand. Its membership includes teachers and workers employed in all occupations in universities, polytechnics, institutes of technology, wānanga, other tertiary education providers and allied organisations.

=== Student associations ===
There are a large number of student associations in New Zealand. The system of student associations operated on the basis of compulsory membership until 2012, after ACT MP Heather Roy's voluntary student membership bill was passed in 2011.

A large number belong to the New Zealand Union of Students' Associations (NZUSA). The parallel overarching student association for Māori is Te Mana Ākonga, the National Māori Students' Association.

Most universities have a student association, and some have additional Māori and Pacific student associations which generally work in parallel with the main association.

=== Other nationwide student bodies ===
In addition to the main students' associations at each institution, there are also a number of other student bodies, which include:

- Aotearoa Student Press Association (ASPA)
- Every Nation Campus Ministries (ENCM)
- Student Life New Zealand (Christian students' association)
- Tertiary Students Christian Fellowship
- UniQ (association of gay, lesbian, bisexual, transgender, transsexual, takataapui and intersex students)
- University Sport New Zealand
- New Zealand Law Students' Association (NZLSA)
- Student Job Search (SJS)
- New Zealand Medical Students' Association (NZMSA)
- Thursdays in Black (TiB)

== See also ==
- Academic ranks in New Zealand
- Aotearoa New Zealand Tertiary Chaplaincy Association
- Education in New Zealand
