= Three Words (book) =

New Zealand/Aotearoa comics anthology

Three Words: An Anthology of Aotearoa/NZ Women's Comics
- Author: Edited by Rae Joyce, Sarah Laing, Indira Neville
- Language: English
- Publisher: Beatnik Publishing
- Publication place: New Zealand
- Media type: Print
- Pages: 264 pages
- ISBN: 978-0-9941205-0-2

Three Words: An Anthology of Aotearoa/NZ Women's Comics is a 2016 collection that was edited by Rae Joyce, Sarah Laing, and Indira Neville. The book was first published on 14 March 2016 and collects together 64 female comic artists from New Zealand. Joyce stated that she wanted to create the collection after reading an anthology that was marketed as a history of New Zealand comics, only to feel that "it was representing the white male POV status quo rather than the reality of comics in NZ". She further commented that she hoped that Three Words would raise awareness for female comics from New Zealand, as she felt that they were under-represented.

The book received a review from Radio New Zealand.

== Synopsis ==
Three Words has comics by 64 female comic artists from New Zealand. Its title references the process of the creation of the content: all contributors chose three words for another contributor to use as a starting point for their comic. Submissions were also open to transgender people who identify as women, or who once identified as women.

The book includes contributions from Beth Ducklingmonster, Jessica Hansell, Rosemary McLeod, and Susan Te Kahurangi King, and features essays by Robyn Kenealy, Rae Joyce, Ruth Boyask, Jem Yoshioka and Miriam Sapphira. The editors welcomed submissions from women with all levels of experience in comics creation, and the finished work included established artists as well as newcomers to the field.

== Contributors ==
=== Comics ===
- Adele Jackson
- Alex McCrone
- Alex Wild
- Alice Tumblescribbleson
- Alie McPherson
- Andra Jenkin
- Anna Crichton
- Bek Coogan
- Beth Dawson / Ducklingmonster
- Beth Sometimes
- Caroline Anderson
- Celia Allison
- Dawn Tuffery
- Debra Boyask
- Demarnia Lloyd
- Diane Rimmer
- Elsie Jolliffe
- Emma Blackett
- Erin Fae
- Giselle Clarkson
- Indira Neville
- Jem Yoshioka
- Jessica Dew
- Jessica Hansell / Coco Solid
- Joanna Anderson
- Judy Darragh
- Kayla Oliver
- Kerry Ann Lee
- Lauren Marriott / Ralphi
- Linda Lew
- Lisa Noble
- Liz Mathews
- Loux McLellan
- Lucy Meyle
- Maiangi Waitai
- Margaret Silverwood
- Marina Williams
- Mary Tamblyn
- Mengzhu Fu
- Miriam Harris
- Mirranda Burton
- Olga Krause
- Pritika Lal
- Rachel Benefield
- Rachel Shearer
- Rae Joyce
- Raewyn Alexander
- Rebecca Hawkes
- Renée Jones
- Rosemary McLeod
- Sally Bollinger
- Sarah Laing
- Sarah Lund
- Sharon Murdoch
- Sophie McMillan
- Sophie Watson / Sophie Oiseau
- Stella Corkery
- Susan Rugg
- Susan Te Kahurangi King
- Suzanne Claessen
- The Rabbid
- Warsaw
- Zoe Colling

=== Essays ===
- Jem Yoshioka
- Miriam Sapphira
- Rae Joyce
- Robyn Kenealy
- Ruth Boyask
