= Bek Coogan =

New Zealand artist and musician

- Born: 1972 (age 53–54); Palmerston North, New Zealand
- Education: Massey University; Victoria University of Wellington
- Occupations: Artist and musician

Bek Coogan (born 1972) is a New Zealand multidisciplinary artist and musician.

== Background ==
Coogan was born in 1972 in Palmerston North, New Zealand, and has lived in Wellington. She is currently based in Paekākāriki. Bek is related to Steve Coogan through their fathers, who are cousins.

== Education ==
Coogan completed a Master's degree in Fine Arts (First-Class Honours) at Massey University in 2004, and a Graduate Diploma in Secondary Teaching at Victoria University of Wellington in 2012.

== Music ==
Coogan first appeared on the New Zealand music scene in 2004 as part of art-rock band Cortina. Their music was described as a fusion of "heavy metal guitar (courtesy of Ace Hurt aka Matt Hunt), odd synth noises, and bizarre lyrics (“ILLUMINATI! JENNY SHIPLEY!”)."

Gareth Shute described her stage persona and dress as "an insane, but stylish 80s housewife: tight jumpsuits, tinted sunglasses, and headbands. At one show at Bodega, Wellington, she squeezed a pie out of the slit in the front of her satin/lace one piece jumpsuit and began scooping out pieces to feed to the crowd. One another occasion, she was recovering from a car accident and completed a national tour wearing a neck brace with “fucked off” scrawled across it." Luke Rowell of Disasteradio characterised her performances as "breaking down the hierarchy between performer and audience."

In 2013, she formed the group Fantasing with Sarah Jane Parton, Claire Harris, and Gemma Syme. A combination of installation art and live performance, they were the Audio Foundation's artists in residence in 2016. Coogan described the group's emotional and artistic support of each other as central to their practice: "Sometimes that is kind of the art." She has also performed solo as Oona Verse and Sheville, and was a member of the band Full Fucking Moon.

Coogan is part of the Wellington International Ukulele Orchestra, with whom she toured various parts of the world between 2012 and 2016, including a month at the Edinburgh Fringe in 2013. Member Andy Morley-Hall describes Coogan: "My mum calls Bek The Original Rebel. I reckon she's like a cosmic whirlwind of new and refreshing ideas. She doesn't see the world quite like the rest of us do. Though she thinks deeply about things she is the opposite of earnest."

Coogan performed the role of Janet in Frankensplurta, a musical prequel to the Rocky Horror Picture Show, in the March 2018 Dunedin Fringe Festival.

== Art ==
Coogan first exhibited her drawings in 2002, which began an ongoing practice based around a character called Sheville and referencing a mythic female utopia. Her influences range from the painter Colin McCahon to feminist, punk-inspired drawing and collage. She has continued to exhibit and perform widely, including shows at Enjoy Gallery, The New Zealand Film Archive and Depot Artspace in Devonport.

Coogan was a contributor to the New Zealand women's comics anthology Three Words, in which she describes her practice: "Coogan is a multidisciplinary artist who likes to test what Art is. Bek sees Performance Art, Video, Bands and Drawing as an active and politicised ideology. Art is a call to the wild or to the source, which Bek endures the shit-fight to get back to using whatever medium she can get her hands on, a vivid or a microphone drawing it up from the earth...There was, and is still now an idealistic aspect to this practice, positing an alternative female and mythic utopia. "But why the farg is it even idealist?" says Sheville, "this shit is normal where I come from."

Coogan has also been the subject of paintings by Liz Maw.

== Publications ==
- Bryce Galloway, Caroline Campbell, Gavin Hipkins, David Hall, Bek Coogan, Adrian McNabb, Clem Devine, Jason Lingard, John Douglas (2002). Incredibly hot sex with hideous people #8 : Exquisite corpse II.
- Coogan, Bek (Summer 2006). "Sheville" Natural Selection 5
- Full Fucking Moon (2009). Still Life With Black Light. Edition Künstlerhäuser Worpswede (12" EP)
- Coogan, Bek, & Tilly, Torben (Spring 2009). "On The Subject Of Fate & the Destiny of Objects", Travelogue: Tactical Objects 2.
- Coogan, Bek, & Up, Ari (2011). Typical girls: comedic feminist video from Wellington
- Coogan, Bek (2016). "Squinting Towards Sunlight". Three words an anthology of Aotearoa/NZ women's comics. Auckland, New Zealand. Beatnik Press, ISBN 9780994120502
- Coogan, Bek (2017). "Savage" Sonic Comic, ISBN 9780473390082
- Coogan, Bek (2017). "Rita Angus" Femisphere 1
