= Jared Lane =

New Zealand artist (born 1972)

This is the cover of the second comic book in Jared Lane's series Progress

Jared Takrouna Lane (born 16 October 1972) is a New Zealand artist. He is best known for his comic art (including his serial Progress), but is also an illustrator, storyboard artist and as an exhibiting fine artist.

== Biography ==
Lane was born on 16 October 1972. After leaving school in Central Otago, New Zealand, he attended the School of Fine Arts, University of Canterbury where he studied painting and became actively involved in student media, including drawing regular cartoons for Canta and working for the student radio station 98RDU. It was while he was at university he met up with fellow New Zealand comic artists and enthusiasts (such as Darren Schroeder, Jason Brice and Ed Dewe) and became a founding member of Funtime Comics. He finished his university studies at the end of 1993, and during later travels met up with Australian award-winning film maker Clint Cure and self-proclaimed underground comic art hustler Mike Fikaris. Jared Lane now lives in Christchurch, New Zealand, with his wife Rachael and their family.

== Comic art ==
Jared's early comic art appeared in student newspapers Canta and Caclin. From 1991 he became a regular contributor to the Funtime Comics anthology Funtime Comics Presents. Since then he has contributed to numerous comic anthologies including: Strip Art Vizura, Pure Evil, Tango Vol 3, Officer Pup 1 & 2. He has produced his own comics: Avatar (1993), Hub, Planet of Death, Slated, Progress 1 to 7. In a review of Progress #6 Steve Saville at Silver Bullet Comic Books wrote; Like Christmas a new edition of Jared Lane’s "Progress" only comes but once a year, and like Christmas it is always worth the wait.

His other significant contribution was to the New Zealand Cartoonists Collective's Millennium Project Nga Tupuna/Ancestors (an 80-page historical chronicle of 1000 years in the histories of two New Zealand families, one Maori, the other European) funded through a grant from the New Zealand Lotteries Commission's Millennium fund.

Jared Lane featured in the Shirley Horrocks documentary The Comics Show about the comics scene in New Zealand.

=== Awards ===
In 2006 Jared's serial Progress #5 was awarded an Eric Award (also known as the Black River Digital New Zealand Comics Awards) for Best Comic. The Erics are judged by an independent panel of comics experts and are the only awards for New Zealand comics. His 2006 award compounded the success he had achieved in 2002, when he received an Eric for Best Short Piece 'Te Kanawa and the Faeries' (tied with Toby Morris).

== Illustrations ==
Lane's illustrations of children's literature can be found in the New Zealand school children's magazine the New Zealand School Journal. He has also drawn and designed for the gig guide The Package.

== Other art ==
Jared Lane's other work include storyboarding for Glenn Standring's horror film, Perfect Creature He has also exhibited as an artist in numerous group exhibitions, and had solo exhibitions at the Centre of Contemporary Art and High Street Project, galleries in Christchurch, New Zealand.
