= Lauren Marriott =

New Zealand illustrator, comics artist, sculptor, and graphic designer

Lauren Marriott (publishing under the name Lauren Farrell from 2019) is a New Zealand illustrator, comics artist, sculptor, and graphic designer. She often draws under the pseudonym Ralphi.

Marriot is best known as the illustrator of the Doodle Cat books, written by Kat Patrick.

== Career ==
Marriott holds a first-class honours degree in design, majoring in illustration, from Massey University. In 2010, for ASB Bank's Creating Futures campaign through advertising agency Droga5, Marriott created an image of a pyramid of chairs, which was featured on the cover of industry journal AdMedia.

== Publications ==
- 2014 I am doodle cat, written by Kat Patrick, illustrated by Lauren Marriott. A reviewer in Australia wrote, "Marriott's illustrations show a simple red cat-shape frolicking through clear white pages ... a clever and arresting book". Another reviewer said, " 'I am Doodle Cat' is a feel-good, quirky, hardback book with simple, colourful, doodle-like illustrations", with "a two-page spread where Doodle Cat announces he loves 'difference'. The accompanying drawing of many cats, all different colours, shapes and sizes imparts a strong message of how to celebrate diversity."
- 2016 Three Words: An Anthology of Aotearoa/NZ Women's Comics, edited by Rae Joyce, Sarah Laing, and Indira Neville. Beatnik, Auckland, New Zealand.
- 2017 Doodle cat is bored, written by Kat Patrick, illustrated by Lauren Marriott. One reviewer for the Children's Book Council of Australia wrote, "It's immensely difficult not to stop and look at this bright yellow cover with a red cat and the most bored expression. ... the pages come alive with fun and colourful illustrations that are sure to delight readers". Another reviewer said, "Bold bright illustrations enliven the minimal text for maximum impact. Each page is well designed using full colour or red and black. The illustrations are energetic and expressive conveying emotion in a minimalist cartoon style. The use of white space is very effective and the double page full colour spreads are a gorgeous riot of colour."
- 2019 Doodle Cat Wears A Cape, written by Kat Patrick, illustrated by Lauren Farrell.

== Exhibitions ==
Saatchi Gallery (2013)

== Awards ==
Book Design Awards Scholastic New Zealand award for best children's book (2015)

Chroma Art Awards, runner up (2015)
