= New Ground =

New Ground may refer to:

== Places ==
- Cambusdoon New Ground, a cricket ground located in Ayr, Scotland
- New Ground, Norwich, former cricket ground in Norwich, England
- New Ground, Saint Vincent and the Grenadines, a village in Saint Vincent and the Grenadines
- New Ground, Uxbridge Moor, former cricket ground near Uxbridge, England

== Other ==
- "New Ground" (Stargate SG-1), an episode of the science fiction television series Stargate SG-1
- "New Ground" (TNG episode), an episode of the fifth season of Star Trek: The Next Generation
- New Ground (comics), a New Zealand comics anthology magazine published by DMZ Comics
- Newgrounds, an American website that hosts games and cartoons

== See also ==
- New Recreation Ground
- New Windmill Ground
