= Meyle =

Meyle is a surname. Notable people with the surname include:

- Gregor Meyle (born 1978), German singer-songwriter
- Lucy Meyle, New Zealand multidisciplinary artist
