= Musical Electronics Library =

Library organization in New Zealand

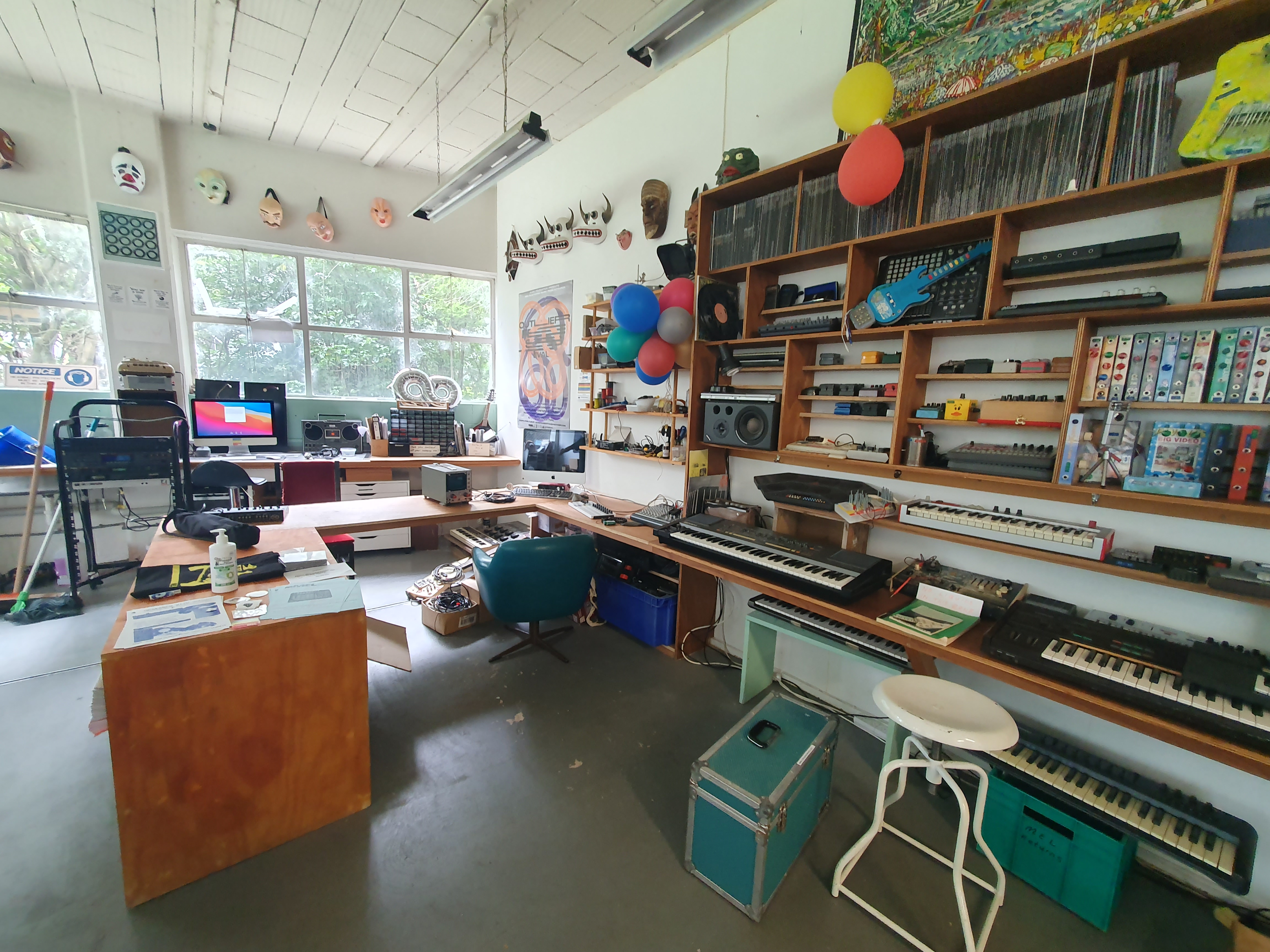
- Abbreviation: MEL
- Formation: November 2014
- Type: NGO, lending library
- Location: New Zealand
- Coordinates: 36.856699°S 174.759786°E
- Region served: New Zealand
- Website: musicalelectronicslibrary.wordpress.com

The Musical Electronics Library (or MEL) is a lending library of homemade electronic musical devices in Auckland and Wellington, New Zealand, and is a worldwide leader in the Scavengetronica movement.

The library contains electrolytic capacitors, rampwave oscillators, white noise generators, light theremins, sample and holds, ring modulators, preamplifiers, pitch shifters, phasers, and mixers; mostly built inside repurposed VHS cases. Highlights of the collection include the "electric bee motorcycle sound-maker box", a device which emulates the sound of meowing cats inside a Cats VHS box, and "Mad Max" which has been described as "Merzbow in a box".

MEL is run by volunteers and curated by musician and device-builder Kraus. The library was inspired by the work of Nicolas Collins and Bob Widlar. Musicians using equipment from MEL include Hermione Johnson, Kraus, Pumice, Diana Tribute, Samuel Flynn Scott, the MEL Orchestra, Piece War, Ducklingmonster, the Biscuits, Powernap, Herriot Row, and Chronic Fatigue Sindrome.

The library has been running synthesizer-building workshops around New Zealand. MEL also co-hosts an open weekly maker night with the Auckland University of Technology where projects are developed in a collaborative environment.

Kraus stated in a New Zealand Listener interview that "doing any kind of community project like this for me is a political thing - of self-organisation and encouraging people to take control of their lives, instead of just being a consumer, buying something someone else has made, or some robots in China. The kind of empowerment that comes from learning a new skill is a really powerful thing." He said in NZ musician magazine that he wants "to emphasise the idea of sharing and also reducing waste through re-using things and giving seemingly broken or out of date things a new purpose."

The library started in Auckland and 2014 and opened a Wellington chapter in 2016.

== Gallery ==
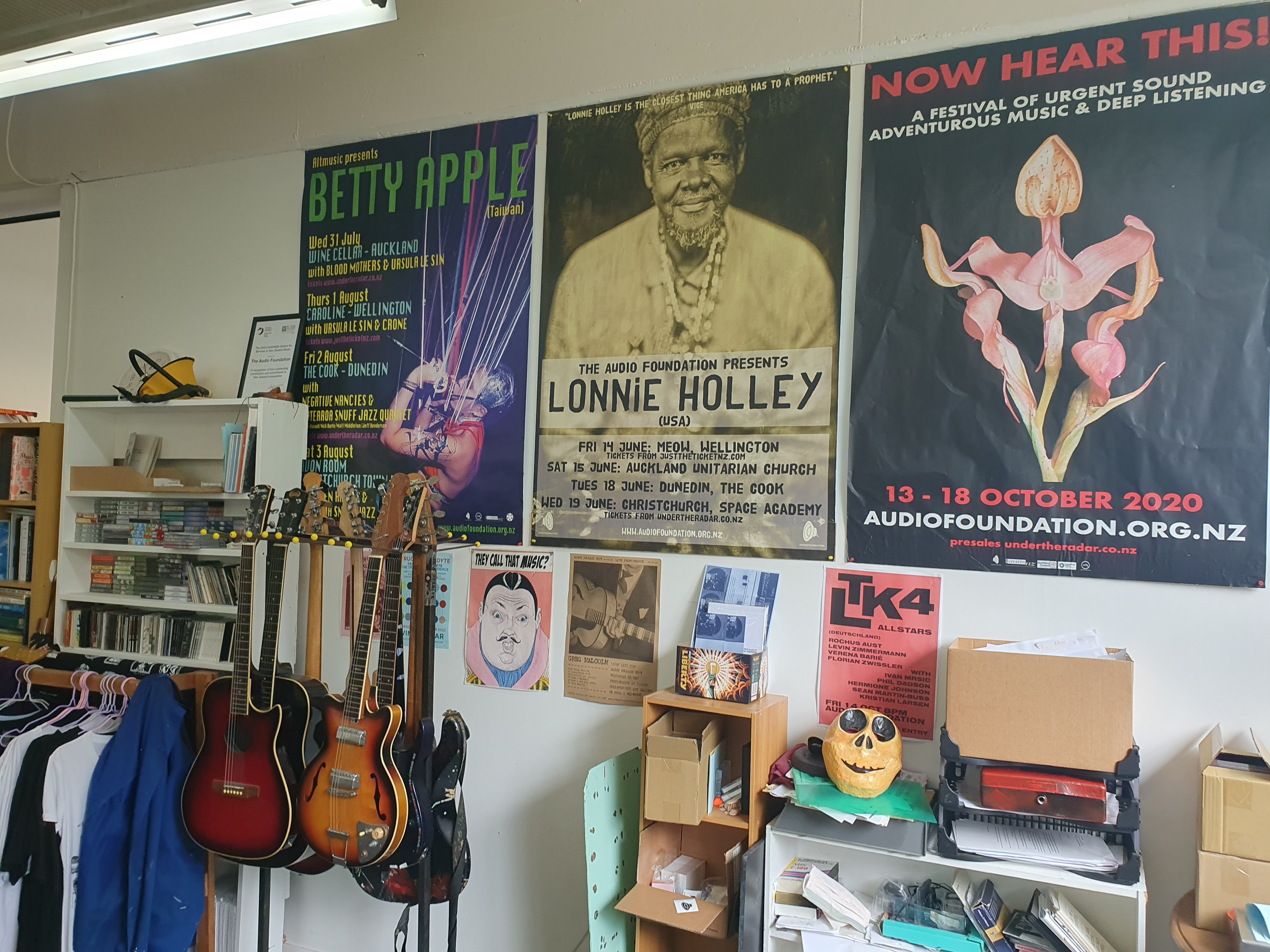

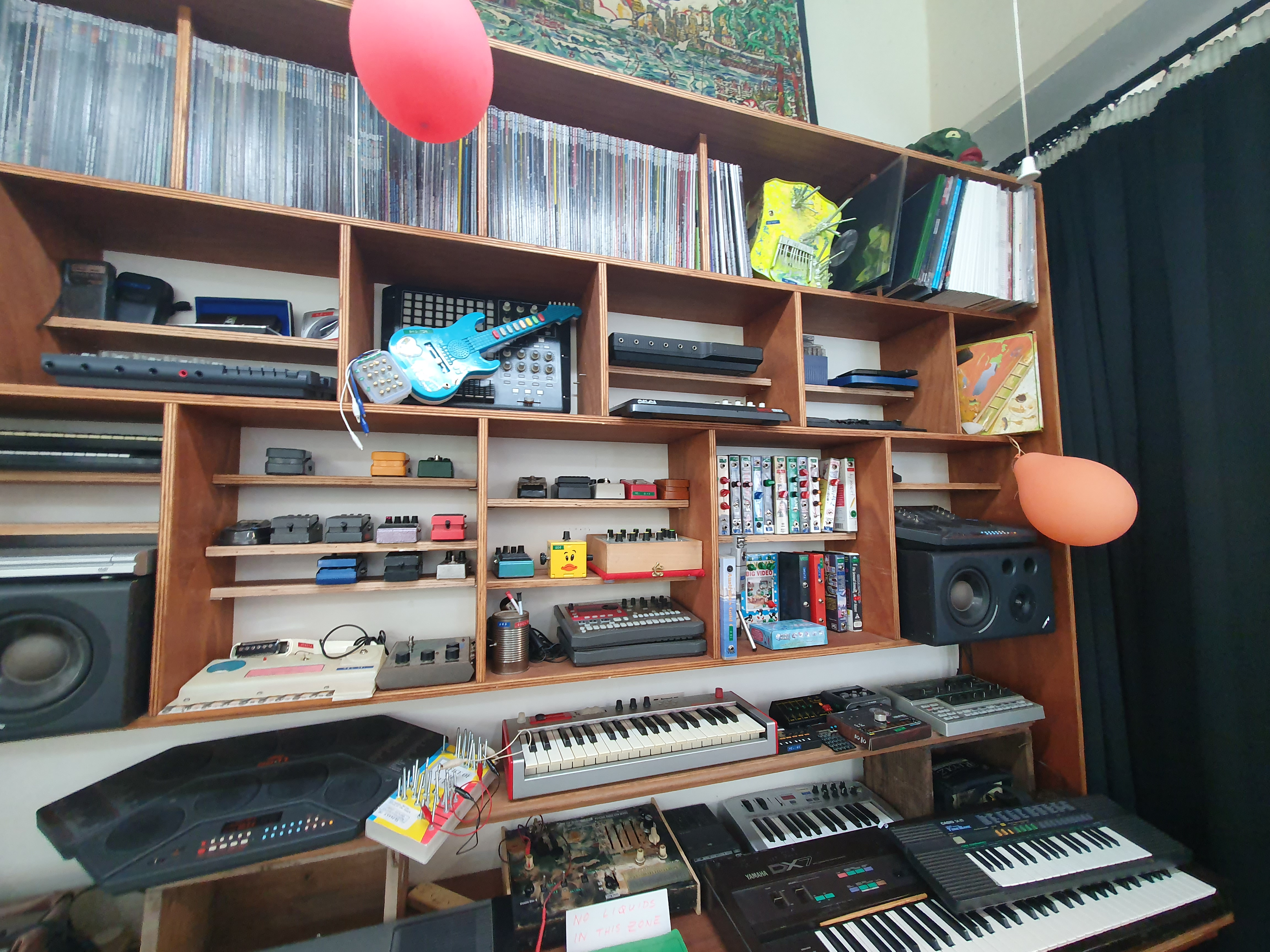

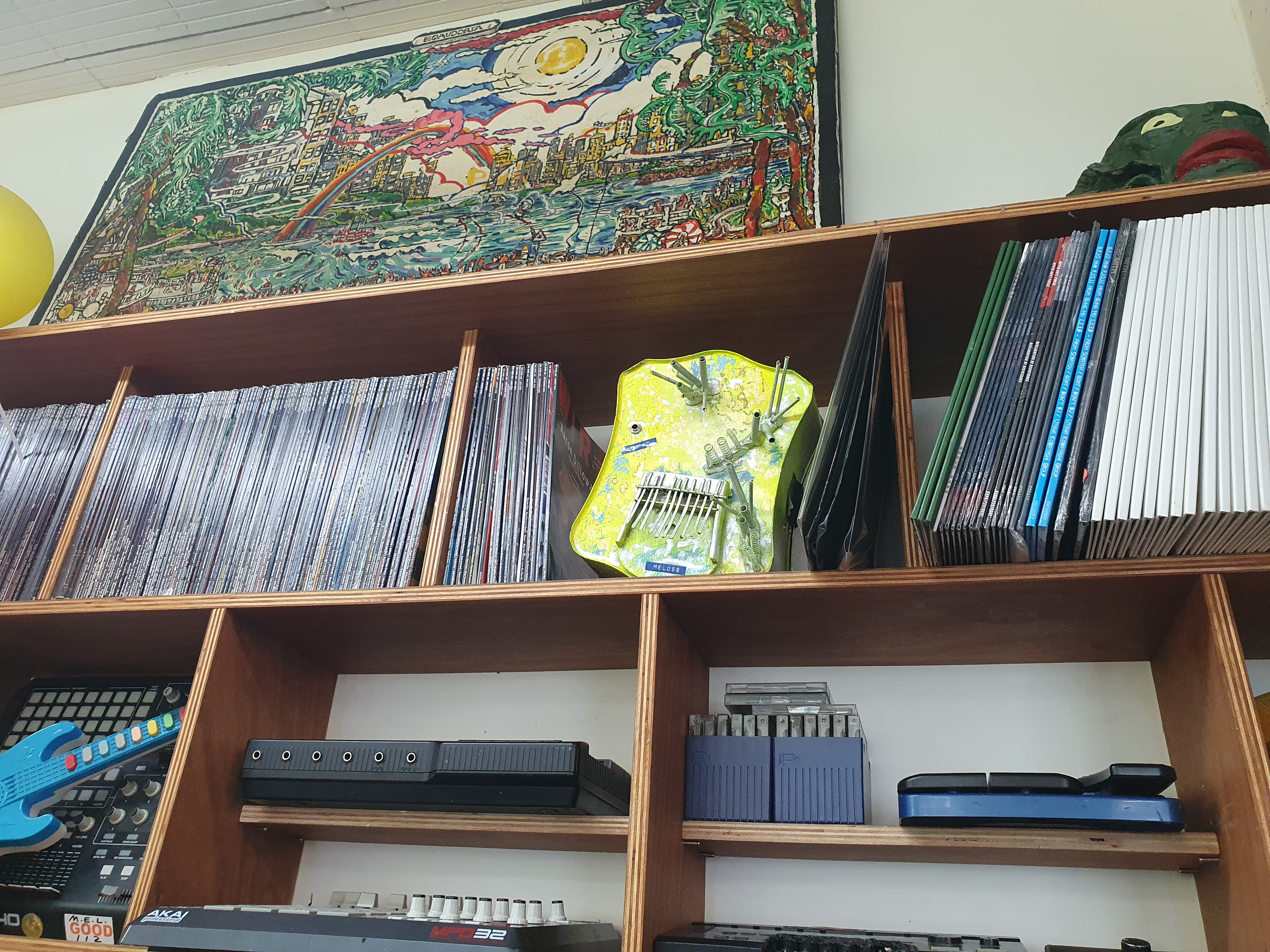

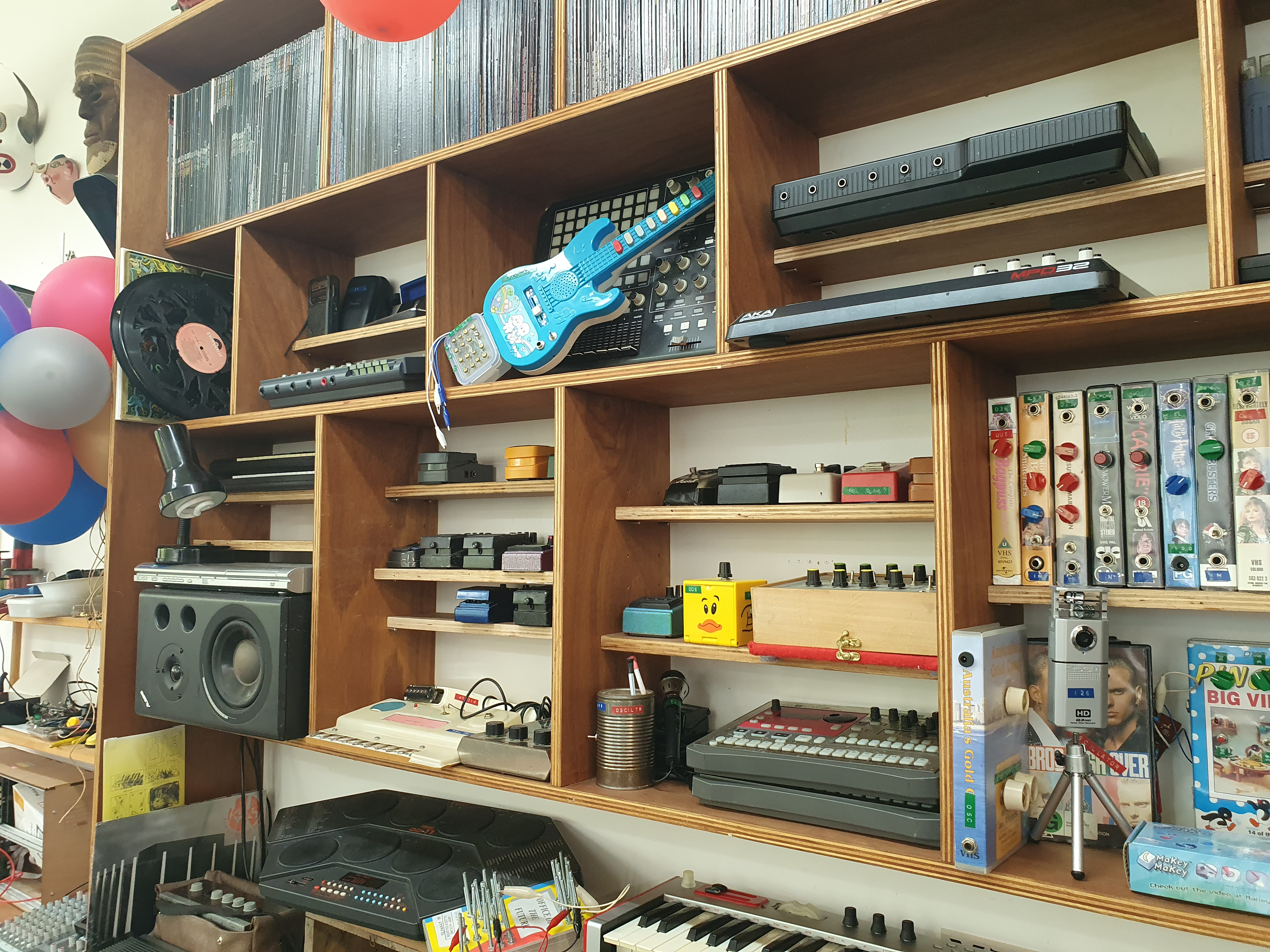

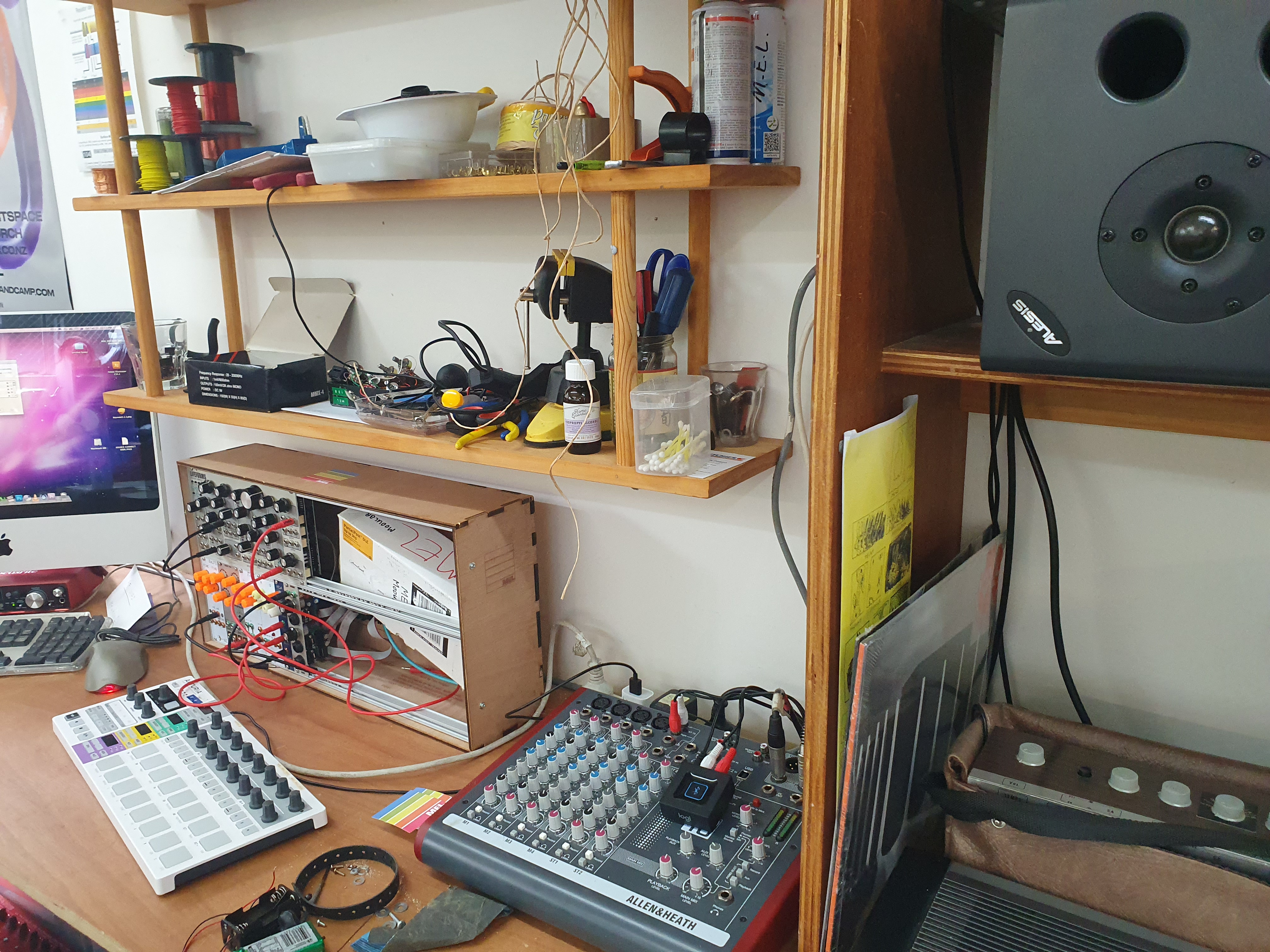
