= Caroline Anderson =

Caroline Anderson may refer to:

- Caroline Anderson (writer), British novelist
- Caroline Still Anderson (1848–1919), American doctor
- Caroline Anderson (New Zealand writer), contributor to 2016 comics anthology Three Words
