= Funtime Comics =

Collective of comic book artists and writers

- Funtime Comics logo
- Formation: 1990; 36 years ago
- Founder: Students from University of Canterbury
- Location: Christchurch, New Zealand

Funtime Comics is a Christchurch, New Zealand based collective of comic artists and writers whose aim is to provide a forum for the promotion and discussion of the comic medium, promote New Zealand comics and encourage local writers and artists through the publishing of their own comics. Funtime publishes the Funtime Comics Anthology, and a variety of other comics, many of which are collaborative efforts, featuring stories and artwork from local and international comics artists.

== History ==
Funtime Comics was formed in 1990 by a group of comic artists and enthusiasts from the University of Canterbury.

Originally conceived by Jason Brice, President of the University of Canterbury's ComicSoc, the first anthology was published the following year under the editorship of Brice (also founder of Comics Bulletin), Bean McGregor, and Nigel Campbell, with the name Funtime coming from a competition for the title and cover banner won by Debra Boyask. The cover of the first issue features a collaboration between Brice and artist Jared Lane, and carried the humorous warning that the comic was not safe in the hands of children, referring to New Zealand's then current legislation around indecent publications.

Edward Dewe assumed the editorship for the next three issues in 1992-1993. Issue 2 was the first published under the series title Funtime Comics Presents, the name by which it was known until Issue 22.

Issue 5 came out in November 1993 under the editorship of Darren Schroeder. He remained editor up until the publication of Issue 21 in 2005. It was during Darren's long-standing editorship that the Funtime anthology extended its range to include contributions from other parts of New Zealand and overseas. He also established the tradition of monthly Funtime Workshops at which members draw comics and drink tea and eat animal biscuits. His efforts also extended to the promotion of New Zealand comics through the creation of the most comprehensive and authoritative resource on New Zealand Comics, the website New Zealand Comics - Comics.org.nz.

Isaac Freeman produced four issues of the regular anthology since mid-2007. In 2011 a special issue of Funtime Comics Anthology was released in response to the devastating earthquake of 22 February 2011 in Funtime's home town of Christchurch, New Zealand. Contributors from all around the world sent work for the special issue and all proceeds from the sale of the comic went to the Red Cross.

In 2014, Jason Lennie took over as editor and the publication became a full-size graphic novel. Using this format, the first Funtime Comics Omnibus, collecting issues 27, 28, 29 was released.

Issue 33 Tales from Pandemia was released in October 2020, and focused on COVID-19. Richard Clinghan, whose work Jenny & the Eddies was featured in this issue, acknowledged that he had been supported by Funtime Comics, and in his role as guest editor, noted that "this year, I have found comfort in picking up a pencil and paper, to imagine, draw and create stories through comics." In the Feature Spotlight of the Issue, Clinghan said that the best piece of advice he got before publishing Jenny & the Eddies was to be more "concise and entertaining" and this came from a Funtime workshop he had attended.

== Achievements ==
Isaac Freeman and Funtime Comics published issue 23 (January 2009) under the new series name Funtime Comics Anthology. With the publication of this issue it is now believed to be New Zealand's longest-running title, in years and number of issues.

In 2006 Issue #20 of Funtime Comics Presents, Unau Prolepsis, won Best Anthology of 2004-2005 in the Black River Digital 'Eric' Awards.

In 2006 the Funtime Comics hosted website New Zealand Comics - Comics.org.nz received the following two awards:

- The 2006 Black River Digital 'Eric' Award for Best Website in New Zealand Comics
- Gibson Comic Awards 2006 Award for Favourite Anthology

A Funtime Comics workshop is featured in the Shirley Horrocks documentary The Comics Show, alongside individual interviews with Funtimers Jared Lane, Isaac Freeman and Darren Schroeder. A DVD version features extra interviews with Funtime artists Ruth Boyask and Bob Gibbons.

== Anthologies ==
- Issue #1: Funtime Cartoons (January 1991)

Funtime Comics Present

- Issue #2: Woof Woof (1992)
- Issue #3: Cyber-Dump (March 1993)
- Issue #4: Wrap Up! (May 1993)
- Issue #5: Dark Panels (November 1993)
- Issue #6: Serious Tome (April 1994)
- Issue #7: Big Life (August 1994)
- Issue #8: Landfill (January 1995)
- Issue #9: Fontan (June 1995)
- Issue #10: Limbeck (July 1996)
- Issue #11: Legumic Ovis (July 1997)
- Issue #11.5: Autumnal Yule(Special) (May 1998)
- Issue #12: Cult-$ure (January 1999)
- Issue #13: Inner Jest (September 1999)
- Issue #14: Edenic Gad (July 2000)
- Issue #15: Pistolgraph (March 2001)
- Issue #16: Decennium (September 2001)
- Issue #17: Stryk Erf (April 2002)
- Issue #18: Lithe Rauk (October 2002)
- Issue #19: Flap-tastic (March 2003)
- Issue #20: Unau Prolepsis (September 2004)
- Issue #21: Jurassic Jam (September 2005)
- Issue #22: Rare Window (June 2007)

Funtime Comics Anthology

- Issue #23: The Walls of Halls (Release Date: January, 2009; Cover: Craig Gillman; Editor: Isaac Freeman)
- Issue #24: Venus Infers (Release Date: March, 2010; Cover: Mat Tait; Editor: Isaac Freeman)
- Issue #25: Short Sharp Shockwave (Release Date: October, 2010; Cover: Danny Sugar; Editor: Isaac Freeman)
- Issue #26: (Release Date: 2012; Cover: Lee Yan Marquez; Editor: Isaac Freeman)

Funtime Comics Anthology (2014 Revival)

- Issue #27: The New Zealand Comics & Art Zine (Release Date: October, 2014; Cover: Jordan Debney; Editor: Jason Lennie)
- Issue #28: The New Zealand Comics & Art Zine (Release Date: October, 2015; Cover: Alex McCrone; Editor: Jason Lennie)
- Issue #29: The New Zealand Comics & Art Zine (Release Date: October, 2016; Cover: Ross Murray; Editor: Jason Lennie)
- Issue #30: The New Zealand Comics & Art Zine (Release Date: October 2017; Cover: Jared Lane; Editor: Jason Lennie)

Funtime Comics & Art Zine

- Issue #31: Best Kept From the Greasy Hands of Gluttons (Release Date: October, 2018; Cover: Ryan Scott; Editor: Jason Lennie)
- Issue #32: Best Kept From the Clutches of Interstellar Scoundrels (Release Date: October, 2019; Cover: Ryan Green; Production Manager: Jason Lennie)
- Issue #33: Funtime Comics Presents: Tales from Pandemia. Comics inspired by the global coronavirus pandemic (Release Date: October, 2020; Cover Art: Richard Clinghan, Colours: Eddie Monotone; Editorial Committee: Funtime Comics Collective; Production Manager: Jason Lennie)
- Issue #34: Best Kept From the Hands of the Unenlightened (Release Date: January, 2022; Cover: Simon Fletcher; Editorial Committee: Funtime Comics Collective; Production Manager: Jason Lennie)
- Issue #35: Best Kept From the Phanlages of the Mad Geneticists (Release Date: April, 2024; Cover: Maya Templer; Editorial Committee: Funtime Comics Collective; Production Manager: Jason Lennie)

== Anthology Contributors ==
Well-known New Zealand comic artists Jared Lane, Bob Gibbons, Isaac Freeman, Debra Boyask and Ruth Boyask are long-term contributors. Funtime has been instrumental in launching the comics/animation careers of several New Zealanders. For example, Craig Gillman (winner of the Favourite New New Zealand Artist - Gibson Awards 2006) and Andrew Kepple (perhaps best known for his animutation French Erotic Film and now working as an animator in Alberta, Canada). Regular international contributors include Zlatko Krstevski from Macedonia, Claudio Parentela from Italy and sisters Mary Knott and Beppi from Baltimore, United States.

== Other Titles ==
- Avatar
- The Sound Of Muzac
- The Case Of The Big Pink Lighthouse
- Are We There Yeti
- Funtime Comics In Bristol
- Jam Comics Textbook
- Darkest Day: Comics for Christchurch

== See also ==
New Ground (comics)
