= Jenny & the Eddies =

2020 book by Richard Clinghan

- Author: Richard Clinghan
- Language: English
- Subject: Fiction dealing with real issues
- Published: 1 January 2020
- Publication place: New Zealand
- Media type: Comic
- ISBN: 9780473529895

Jenny & the Eddies is a comic book that promotes vaccine safety and confronts conspiracy theorists who oppose their use. Created by New Zealand-based general practitioner Richard Clinghan and published in 2020, it is a fairy tale with colourful drawings likely to appeal to young children and but also has a deeper message about the importance of vaccinations which would be relevant to teenagers and adults. Written initially to counter misinformation about the measles vaccine, the comic has received media attention because of its relevance to COVID-19.

== Background ==
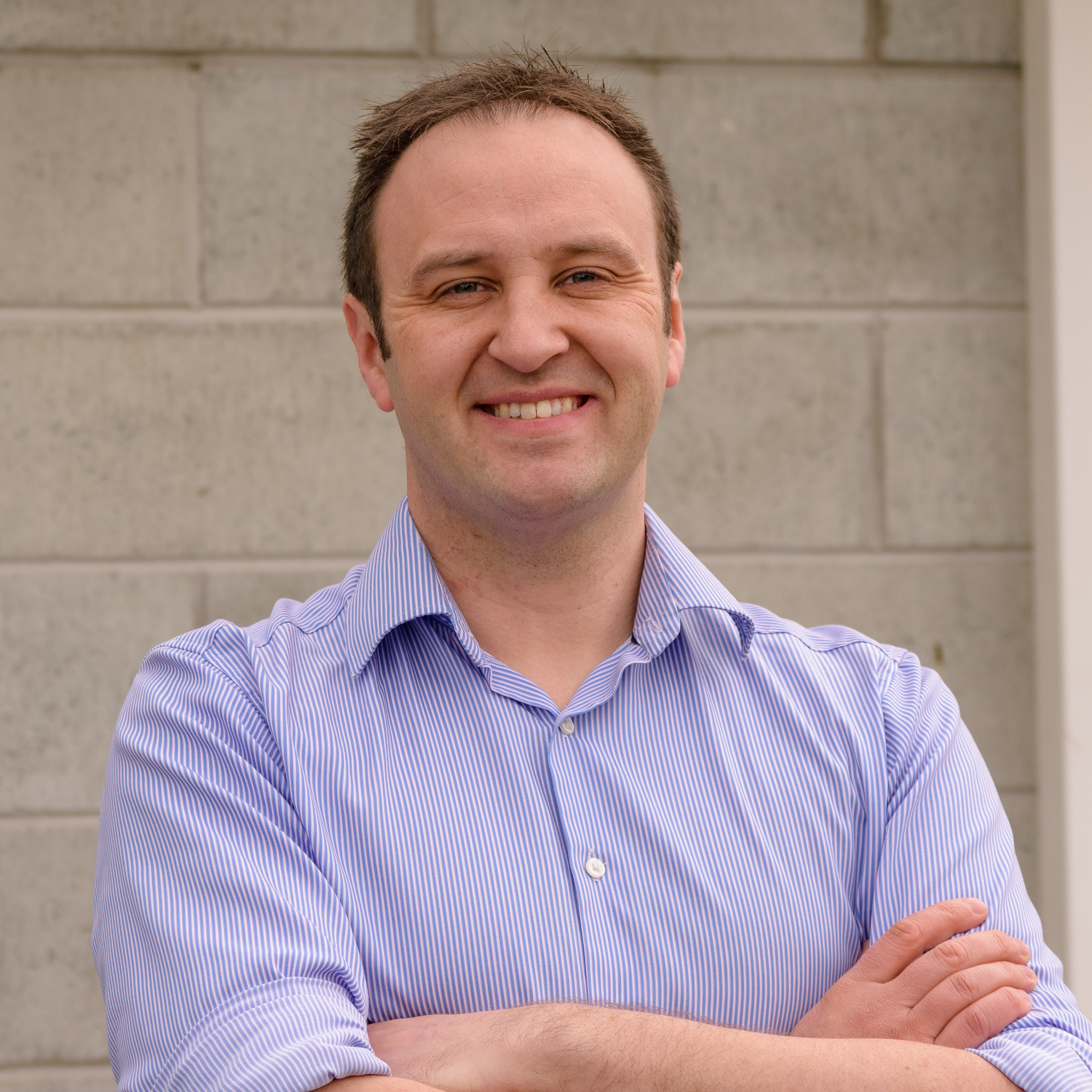
Richard Clinghan

Richard Clinghan was born in Northern Ireland and moved to New Zealand to 2010. He works as a General Practitioner and Rural Hospital Medicine Generalist at the Oxford Community Health Centre (New Zealand).

Clinghan was inspired to create Jenny & the Eddies after the New Zealand 2019 measles epidemic to have in his waiting room to reassure parents that vaccines were safe. Clinghan said the goal was to encourage those who were resistant to vaccines, to get vaccinated.

Clinghan acknowledged that he did a lot of work on the comic in lockdown in New Zealand during COVID-19, and said the initiative was an attempt to connect with both children and parents to alleviate concerns about vaccines in a creative way.

Clinghan received support from Funtime Comics - a nonprofit group of comic creators established in 1991 by students at the University of Canterbury. He told Funtime that he had been influenced by Scott McCloud because his works Making Comics and Understanding Comics: The Invisible Art showed how comics worked and that they could be "magical" and encourage the use of the imagination. Clinghan concluded that "drawing can help ease your mind, settle your worries and give you an opportunity to find a moment to refocus on things that add the most value to your life. This is usually your family and friends".

Clinghan contributed a segment of Jenny & the Eddies and a comic White Blood Cells and Blueprint, to the 2020 Funtime issue, funtimecomics#33: Tales from Pandemia (comics inspired by the global coronavirus pandemic).

According to Zahra Shahtahmasebi, Jenny & the Eddies was first launched at the Christchurch Armageddon Expo in July 2020.

== Theme ==
The book's theme is that vaccines have been scientifically proven to be safe and are a victim of their own success. The storyline offers the opportunity for characters to come to the realisation that vaccines can take care of themselves and only need to be trusted by people. The text challenges the reader to imagine how viruses and vaccines might interact if they had human behaviours and qualities. Viruses are monsters that silently attack and cause suffering, while a vaccine is a dog that is always loyal and protective of people. Jenny & the Eddies promotes vaccine safety and reassures concerned parents in a non-confrontational manner. Clinghan has said he preferred not to discuss conspiracy theories directly, but the comic does explore how anti-vaccination views can misguide parents and the storyline and characters create situations that expose misinformation about vaccines and how to stand up to these theories.

== Plot ==
When Jimmy gets sick in the elven kingdom after playing near the forest, the elven children share stories about when they were attacked by the forest monsters. Jenny asks her grandfather about the forest monsters and he says they had always been around, but wonders why 'each monster only visits a child once in a lifetime'. Jenny reads a book left out by her grandpa that tells of a legend about a beast in the forest that can protect elves from the monsters and she goes in search of it. While in the forest, she gets saved from the monsters by a friendly 'dog-like' creature that she takes home and names Eddie. It becomes known that there are more Eddies in the forest and soon most of the elves in the kingdom have one, and are all well and happy. However, some of the elves begin sharing stories about the Eddies, saying they are causing problems and there is a move to stop giving them to the children. In particular, Jeremy tells lies about the Eddies and even says they make the children whistle – something the kingdom has previously complained about. Jeremy tries to trick the community into believing that if the Eddies are split into three, the forest monsters will be scared of them and the kingdom will be safe. When the children in the kingdom start making beautiful music, the elves realise that they were so infatuated with blaming the Eddies for causing the whistling, that they did not put their energies into helping the children control it. The whistling was something that the elves would all do together to drown out the whisper monsters and ignore their lies so that eventually, they would go away. When enough elves believe this, happiness returns to the kingdom.

== Reception ==
The comic was widely covered in New Zealand news media. Urzila Carlson on a New Zealand current affairs talk show The Project saw the comic book as an attempt to correct fake news about vaccines by approaching the issue in a whole new way, while co-host Jesse Mulligan acknowledged that Clinghan had gone to a "lot of trouble to convince people that vaccines work". Journalist Peter Mckenzie writing in Stuff, said Clinghan's experience illustrated a "growing concern in New Zealand's medical community: that if and when our vaccine roll-out begins, conspiratorial thinking will prevent the country from reaching a critical mass where it's safe to re-open the borders or lead to more deaths when we do". In another article it was noted that Clinghan had received a positive review on his Facebook page from John Gillies, a retired physician who is also an artist.

Jenny & the Eddies was officially approved and endorsed by the Immunisation Advisory Centre (IMAC), an organisation at the University of Auckland that provides factual information nationwide to New Zealanders about vaccines and immunisation.

The New Zealand Doctor headlined [that Clinghan] was "mixing science and art to help patients make informed vaccine decisions".

On 26 January 2021 when Jacinda Ardern the New Zealand Prime Minister announced that a vaccine was likely to be in the country within a week, Clinghan stated that "the vaccine will defend itself – calling people crazy or stupid will never change their mind." By 24 March 2011, when the rollout of the vaccine for COVID-19 in New Zealand was underway, Duncan Garner on The AM Show suggested that the comic format was an effective way for people to learn, and Jenny & the Eddies could break down barriers.

Noelle Reyes, in a review on the pop culture site AIPT Science, said that "Clinghan's story and art present a refreshing and vibrant narrative on viruses and vaccines...[and the comic is]...an enjoyable read for young kids to learn more about vaccines and viruses in an engaging, non-threatening manner".
