= Debra Boyask =

British comics artist and educational developer (1966–2013)

Debra Jane Boyask (Chelmsford, England, 11 April 1966 – Bristol, England, 23 April 2013) was a comics artist and educational developer. Boyask was born and died in England, but lived for many years in New Zealand, after moving there with her family in 1974.

== Education ==
Boyask completed a Bachelor of Education (hons) at the University of Canterbury in 1992 and worked as an educational evaluator in New Zealand and then an educational developer on her return to the UK.

== Comics ==
Boyask was an "integral part of the Christchurch comics scene in the 1990s", contributing to Funtime Comics (after winning a competition to produce its title and banner) while also producing her own independent comics. Her sister Ruth Boyask also produced comics for Funtime, at the time they were the only female contributors to the anthology.

She continued to contribute to Funtime after moving back to England in the early 2000s. She also began publishing in a number of British anthologies including, Factor Fiction and the Girly Comics.

She organised Midwinter Comics Retreats for artists in both New Zealand and England and was known for her support of new artists.

Boyask produced comics under a number of pen names, including 'Teacake', 'Pelms' and 'Bad Astronaut'.

She was also actively involved in the LGBTI community, and to diversity issues within the comics community.

== Publications ==
- Funtime Comics (1990-). Christchurch, New Zealand.
- The Ancient Geeks (2001). Self published, Christchurch, New Zealand.
- Adult issues (2001). Self published, Christchurch, New Zealand.
- Naughty tales from academia (2001). Self published, Christchurch, New Zealand.
- The sound of muzac (2001). Self published, Christchurch, New Zealand.
- The girly comic (2002 - ). England, Factor Fiction Press.
- Twelve Go Nuts in Gloucester (2005), with Jay Eales, Terry Wiley and others. England, Factor Fiction Press.
- Three Words: an anthology of Aotearoa/NZ women's comics (2016), edited by Rae Joyce, Sarah Laing and Indira Neville. Auckland, New Zealand, Beatnik.
