= Susan Te Kahurangi King =

New Zealand artist (born 1951)

Susan Te Kahurangi King (born 1951) is an artist from New Zealand who found international fame in 2009.

== Biography ==
She was born in Te Aroha in 1951.

King is a self-taught artist whose ability to speak declined by the age of four; by the age of eight she stopped speaking altogether. She has methodically created an entire analogous world through drawings using pen, graphite, coloured pencil, crayon and ink.

In the middle-to-late 1970s, King produced intricate, hypnotic dreamscapes that powerfully blend animals, humans and inanimate objects into networked tapestries. During the 1980s, King began to reduce the representational content of her drawings, instead focusing on diagrammatic compositions with a cell- or map-like structure. King drew prolifically through to the early 1990s. After, for an unknown reason, she suddenly stopped. King resumed drawing in 2008 when documentary film maker Dan Salmon began filming her and her art.

Art collector and curator Peter Fay discovered her work and curated a solo show for her in Sydney in 2009. In 2013 King showed at the prestigious Paris Outsider Art Fair. In 2015 she had her first solo US show Drawings from Many Worlds at the Andrew Edlin Gallery in New York. In July 2016, King's debut museum exhibition opened at the Institute of Contemporary Art, Miami. Her work was exhibited at the Marlborough Contemporary gallery in London in 2018 and at the Intuit: The Center for Intuitive and Outsider Art in 2019.

King has public collections held by Te Papa, The Museum of Modern Art, Philadelphia Museum of Art, Chartwell Collection and the James Wallace Arts Trust.

A monograph of King's work was published in 2016 by the Institute of Contemporary Art, Miami. King also contributed to the 2016 anthology of New Zealand women's comics, Three Words.

In 2016 the American Folk Art Museum founded the Susan Te Kahurangi King Fellowship program.

In 2024, MARCH Gallery published "Susan Te Kahurangi King: Character Development", a taxonomy of figures used by King within her drawings which are accompanied by notes from King's sister, Petita Cole. The publication was released in conjunction with a solo exhibition of King's works at MARCH titled "The Gradual and Inevitable Dissolution of Mickey Mouse" in June 2024.
