= Robyn E. Kenealy =

New Zealand comic book artist

- Born: 1983 (age 42–43)
- Area: Cartoonist
- Notable works: Roddy's Film Companion; American Captain
- Awards: "Best Cartoon" ASPA Awards (2009)

Robyn E. Kenealy (born 1983) is a comic book artist and organiser in the New Zealand art communities. She is based in Wellington and had a role in establishing the 91 Aro St Gallery, organising the New Zealand Comics Weekend and the Eric Awards. Kenealy's early works, Influenza in Wellington and Love Ain't Easy, were predominantly autobiographical comics. Her later work, Roddy's Film Companion (a biography of the film actor Roddy McDowall), marks a distinct shift from this style. Although Roddy's Film Companion is biographical, it is also fictional and frequently acknowledges the limitations of 'truth' and 'fact' in historical research. These themes are continued in Steve Rogers' American Captain, an autobiographical comic told from the perspective of Captain America's alter-ego.

== Roddy's Film Companion ==
From 2005 to 2011, Kenealy produced Roddy's Film Companion, a semi-fictional/biographical comic about the life of the actor Roddy McDowall, whose most well-known role was playing Cornelius in Planet of the Apes. Richard Burton, Elizabeth Taylor, Joseph Mankiewicz, and Darryl Zanuck are also featured in the comics. However, Roddy's Film Companion is not concerned with presenting an accurate portrait of Roddy McDowall's life but rather interrogating the limits of 'truth' and 'reality' in biographies through fictionalisation. As Kenealy writes on her website, "Roddy's Film Companion is a one-half semi-fictional biography comic of child star cum character actor Roddy McDowall (whom you might remember from such films as How Green Was My Valley and Planet of the Apes) and one-half a musing on the phenomenon of celebrity itself, as applied to both author and subject." The first issue, released in 2006, is set while Roddy was filming the Darryl Zanuck production of Cleopatra. In late 2008, she started uploading Roddy's Film Companion online.

Kenealy won the award for the best cartoon in the 2009 ASPA awards with The Darkroom weekly serial (a backstory to Roddy's Film Companion), which appeared in Salient Magazine. One of the judges, Dylan Horrocks, wrote that Kenealy's comics have "all kinds of smarts going on just below the surface." Tim Bollinger wrote that The Darkroom has "smart conversational language and pen-and-ink-wash visual narrative."

== Steve Rogers' American Captain ==
Steve Rogers' American Captain is an autobiographical comic told from the perspective of Captain America's alter-ego, Steve Rogers. Its title is a reference to American Splendor and American Elf. It has been featured in New York magazine.

== Arts organiser ==
Kenealy and her husband Richard (Dick) Whyte curate the ongoing art collection The Wayfarer Gallery based in Wellington's Wayfarer Library, archiving Wellington experimental art. It currently owns over 200 works from artists such as Rick Jensen, GCR, Brent Willis, Tao Wells, Mark Whyte, Smiley, Sam Stephens, and others. In 2004, they collaborated with others to open the 91 Aro Street Gallery, another Wellington outlet for independent arts. 91 Aro Street sold and exhibited comics, cassette tapes, CDs, books, films, paintings, photographs, pictures, and work from New Zealand experimental artists. It was open for twelve months while they held the lease on the premises and held more than 20 exhibitions.

It was in 2005 that 91 Aro St was the venue for the first New Zealand Comics Weekend, a weekend devoted to the exhibition and celebration of New Zealand comics. Since then, Kenealy has been the major organiser of this event in 2006 and contributed to the 2007 event, organised by cartoonists DRAW and Tim Bollinger. The 2006 event also included the Eric Awards, an independently judged New Zealand comic award. Robyn and Dick hosted the event, which also featured stand-up comedian Darren Schroeder as the MC. In 2010, Kenealy organised the 5th New Zealand Comics Weekend at The Basement Gallery in Wellington, New Zealand (with the help of DRAW, Claire Harris, and Tim Bollinger).

In 2009, Kenealy was the spokesperson for the Concerned Citizens exhibition and art event, which raised funds and awareness for those arrested in the 2007 New Zealand raids. It contained work by many artists, including Tame Iti, Campbell Kneale, and Kenealy herself, which Nándor Tánczos and John Minto auctioned.

== Influences ==
Robyn's influences include Peter Bagge, Roberta Gregory, Chester Brown, Harvey Pekar, Joe Matt, James Baldwin, Yasunari Kawabata, Jun'ichirō Tanizaki, Simone de Beauvoir, Charles Bukowski, Kurt Vonnegut, Michel Foucault, Roland Barthes, Vito Russo, Northern Exposure, Curb Your Enthusiasm, Twin Peaks, Buffy the Vampire Slayer, Shortland Street, Trailer Park Boys, The Royle Family, Who's Afraid of Virginia Woolf, Cat on a Hot Tin Roof, and Blue Collar.

== Films ==
Robyn featured in the 2004 Toby Donald and Dick Whyte documentary, Boys Suck: Throw Rocks at Them, first screened at the New Zealand Comics Weekend at 91 Aro St Gallery, later to be released on DVD. The documentary followed Robyn and fellow comic artist G.C.R. to the Eric Awards 2004. Kenealy also appeared in Elric Kane and Alexander Greenhough's 2004 independent feature film Murmurs, set in a bohemian Wellington subculture. These films are considered part of the Aro Valley film movement.

Shirley Horrocks interviewed her in her documentary The Comics Show, which screened at the 2007 New Zealand International Film Festival.

== Other activities ==
Kenealy also plays guitar and banjo, makes conceptual art, dabbles in painting and haiku, has written short stories, and is currently writing a novel.

== Bibliography ==
- Influenza In Wellington issues 1–4 (2003–2005)
- Love Ain't Easy parts one and two (2005)
- Roddy's Film Companion, about child and adult star Roddy McDowall (2005–2011)
- Steve Rogers' American Captain: A Diary Comic (2012–present)

== Exhibitions ==
- Rubbernek 2, group exhibition at Enjoy Gallery 2001
- Wayfarer Presents, group exhibition at Enjoy Gallery, 2002
- Spring, installation piece at 91 Aro Street, 23 Aug - 6 Sept 2005
- Wellington Comics Exhibition at Mezzo Gallery, 15–29 April 2005
- Bottled (s)Words/W.Art, DAF 106 Gallery, 2008
- I like sex and I’m a girl, DAF 106 Gallery, 2008
- EGO, DAF 106 Gallery, 2009
- Concerned Citizens: A Fundraising Exhibition to Help the Victims of the October 15th “Anti Terrorism” Raids, Garrett Street, 2011
