= Kraus (New Zealand musician) =

- Also known as: Pat Kraus
- Born: New Zealand
- Genres: Pop, experimental, instrumental
- Occupations: Musician, composer
- Instruments: Organ, guitar, drums, synthesiser
- Years active: 1998–present
- Website: kraus.co.nz

Kraus (also known as Pat Kraus, formerly known as Prince Kraus) is a New Zealand experimental musician and composer. The New Zealand Listener called him "a national treasure" and "one of the most quietly important and interesting people making music in New Zealand". His music crosses the boundaries of electronic music, post-rock, no wave, space folk, noise pop, punk rock and martian stomp.

== Work ==
Kraus has stated that he makes music for freaks, outsiders, losers and weirdos. Most of his music is released under a Creative Commons license with a non-commercial clause, consistent with his communist ideology.

He is influenced by medieval music, renaissance music, traditional Japanese music, psychedelic music and electronic music.

Kraus's work has been compared to Raymond Scott, Norman Mclaren, Moondog, Doctor Who, Sun Ra, Amps for Christ, Joe Meek, the Shaggs, John Frusciante, Pumice, Bruce Haack, Tangerine Dream, Flower Travellin' Band, Can, Kraftwerk, Goblin, Throbbing Gristle, Brian Eno, The Residents, Randy Holden, Janis Joplin, Jimi Hendrix, Jean-Michel Jarre, Peaking Lights, Emily Dickinson, Tod Dockstader, Marvin the Martian, Maureen Tucker, Men's Recovery Project, Captain Beefheart and Royal Trux.

Kraus started performing live in late 2013 with a revolving cast of supporting musicians, including Stefan Neville (of Pumice and the Five Satans), Angeline Chirnside (of Currer Bells and It Hurts), Claire Mahoney, Nell Thomas, Dan Beban, artist Bek Coogan, Reuben Derrick, Sean Norling, Alex Brown, Gary War, Marijn Verbiesen, composer and pianist Hermione Johnson, and the writer Maryann Savage.

In 2014 Kraus was awarded the Audio Foundation Winter Residency.

The name Kraus was partly inspired by Dagmar Krause and Inga Swenson's character on Benson.

== Other activities ==
Kraus was a founding member of the Futurians and has played in the Aesthetics and the Murdering Monsters. He currently records and performs in Pouffe (with Matt Plunkett of The Trendees), the Maltese Falcons (with Ducklingmonster Futurian of It Hurts, Stefan Neville of Pumice, and Sean O'Reilly of SF), Olympus (with Stefan Neville), Magic Mountain, The Gaze, and various ad-hoc improvised ensembles.

He hosts a fortnightly radio show, and builds his own synthesisers and guitar pedals which are used by many New Zealand bands including It Hurts. He has been instrumental in setting up and curating the Musical Electronics Library and has been running synth-building workshops around New Zealand.

== Discography ==
=== Solo albums ===
- Joy cassette (2002)
- Prince Krauss CD (2003)
- Emily CD (2003)
- I Could Destroy You with a Single Thought CD / LP (2004)
- Lamentations of an Ape CD / cassette (2005)
- Red, Green and Blue CD (2006)
- The Facts cassette (2007)
- Harmony of the Squares Volume 1 CD (2007)
- Faster than the Speed of Time LP (2010)
- Blank Mountain CD (2010)
- Golden Treasury CD / cassette (2010)
- Supreme Commander LP / cassette (2011) – released on "outer space wax" (vinyl with white specks)
- 14/10/12 (2014) - recorded live in Kingsland for a WFMU broadcast. Featuring Maryann Savage and Stefan Neville.
- Interior Castle cassette (2014)
- Workers in Kontrol CD (2014)
- Here Come the Recorders cassette (2015)
- Mountain of the Moon cassette (2016)
- Grip the Moon cassette (2017)
- Pudding Island cassette (2019)
- Valley of the Gourds cassette (2019)
- A Golden Brain cassette (2020)

=== Solo singles ===
- Luxury and Mystery 7-inch (2010)
- A Journey Through the First Dimension with Kraus 7-inch EP (2011)
- 141492 7-inch (2011)
- Telstar 7-inch EP (2011) – features covers of "Telstar" by the Tornados, "Space Truckin'" by Deep Purple, and "I Go to Sleep" by Ray Davies.
- Seven Nights in a Rogue's Bed 7-inch (2015) – split with Kawabata Makoto.

=== Compilation appearances ===
- Arc Death cassette / CD (2001)
- Animals 2CD (2004)
- Sink or Swim cassette (2009)
- Menhir double 7-inch EP (2009)
- La Bamba LP (2009)
- Dirt Beneath the Daydream CD (2009) – free with White Fungus and The Wire magazines.
- If you Wanna Rob a Bank, Own One: Credit Card Singles, 2009-2010 CD (2010)
- Realistic Pillow 7-inch EP (2013)
- Deep & Meaningful Volume 1 postcard album (2014)
- You’re Not Invited: New Zealand’s Underground, 2010-2015 triple-album (2015)
- Deep & Meaningful Volume 2 postcard album (2014)
- Deep & Meaningful Volume 3 postcard album (2015)
- Psi-Solation (Celebrate Psi Phenomenon 2020)

=== Recordings with other bands ===
- Pretty Picture 7-inch – Murdering Monsters (2000)
- Bitch 7-inch EP – CJA (2000)
- 12 Truck Drivin' Classics cassette – Murdering Monsters (2001)
- Crown Sat. Nov. 11 cassette – Murdering Monsters and the Aesthetics (2001)
- Off CD – The Aesthetics (2001)
- Blastov! – The Futurians (2002)
- Untitled CD – Armpit and Kraus (2007)
- Goldair CD – CJA and Kraus (2010)
- Bold Mould LP – Olympus (2010)
- Malll CD – Pouffe (2011)
- The Maltese Falcons LP – The Maltese Falcons (2011)
- Live at the Victoria Theatre 7-inch EP – Olympus (2011)
- We Live in the Mind CD – Pouffe (2012)
- I am Lost at Home CD – Pouffe (2016)
- Caucus LP – Olumpus (2020)
