= Jem Yoshioka =

Comics illustrator

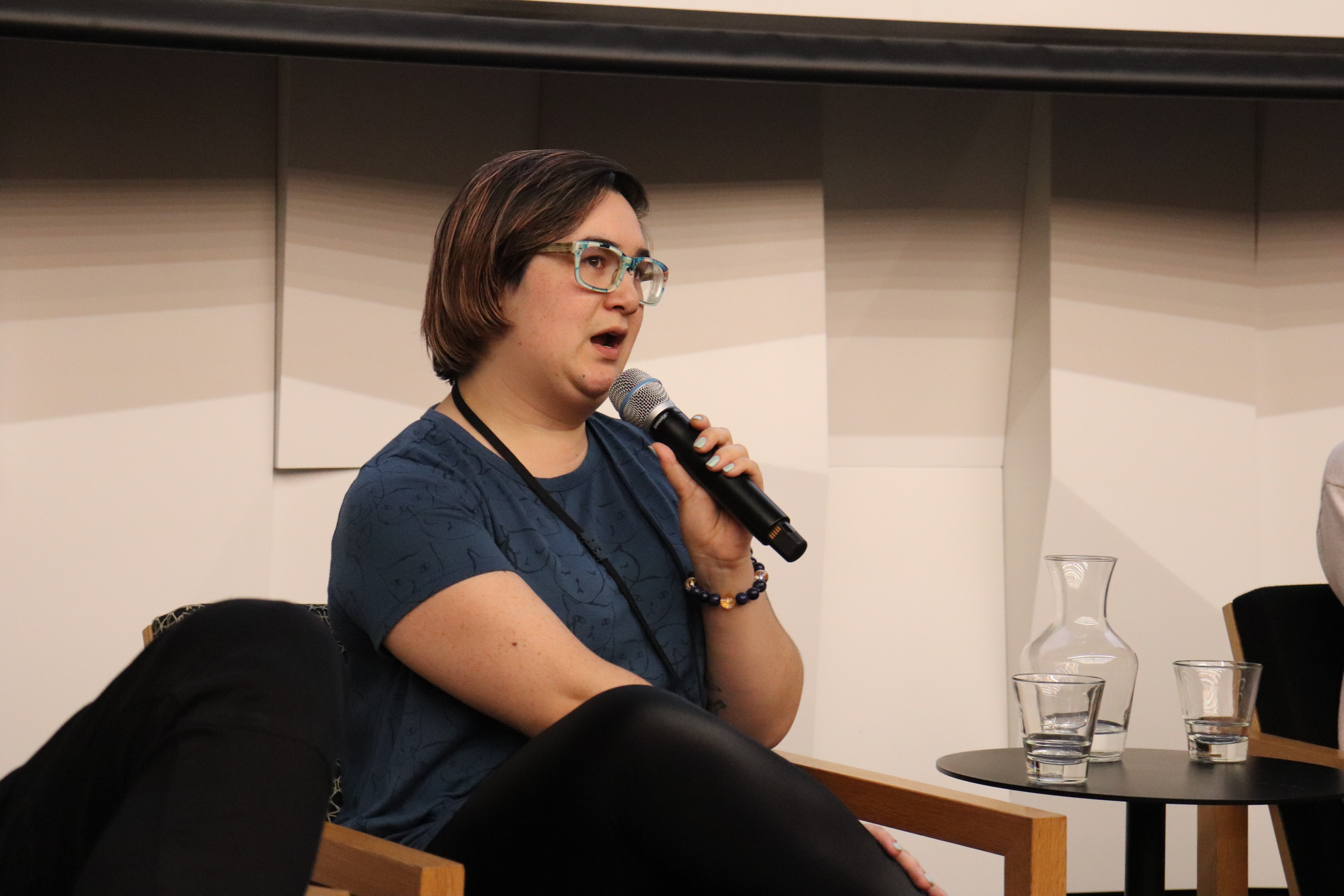
- Yoshioka in 2019
- Born: 1986 (age 39–40)
- Writing career
- Language: English
- Genres: Cartoons, illustration
- Notable works: Circuits and Veins
- Notable awards: Supreme Remix Award in 2010 Mix and Mash, first place in the Chromacon New Zealand Indie Arts Festival Comic Awards in 2013 and 2015
- Website: Circuits and Veins

Jem Yoshioka (born 1986) is a New Zealand illustrator and comic artist. She has won several comic awards and is best known for her webcomic Circuits and Veins which has attracted a large following on Webtoon.

== Biography ==
Jem Yoshioka is of Japanese and Pākehā heritage. As a young child she was always interested in storytelling and drawing, and as a teenager, she started creating her own stories and worlds. She did not have access to many comics growing up, apart from Tintin, but once she discovered comics on the Internet, she found a whole new way of telling stories.

She grew up in Napier and studied Computer Graphic Design at Whanganui School of Design. She is a freelance illustrator and also works full-time in the communications industry. She lives in Wellington, New Zealand.

She works in various media, including digital illustration, watercolour and ink work, and soft textiles.

== Work ==
Yoshioka has always been interested in science fiction and fantasy genres and her work, both fiction and non-fiction, circles around themes of belonging, place and heritage. An early influence on her work is Shaun Tan because of how he handled the relationship between words and pictures. Other influences on her work comes from her love of photography, video games, traditional Japanese printmaking, fashion, animation, film, fine art, dance and novels. She began in her teens and early 20s with creating long-form webcomic publishing, but switched to short comics. This allowed her to focus and tell a different type of story.

She has been published in Loop Magazine, Tearaway and World Sweet World, Three Words - the New Zealand Women’s comics anthology and by Square Planet Comics, as well as creating band posters and merchandise. Her work has been published in the New Zealand School Journal.

An Opal Dream Cave, inspired by a poem by Katherine Mansfield of the same name and images from the photograph collection of the National Library, won the Supreme Remix Award in the 2010 Mix and Mash competition. She won first place in the Chromacon New Zealand Indie Arts Festival Comic Awards in 2013 and 2015.

She has published several webcomics, including Circuits and Veins which features two female characters, human and android and has thousands of subscribers and over a million views on the webcomic platform Line Webtoon.

In 2017, Yoshioka's work was featured as part of Satellites, a series of exhibitions across Auckland showcasing contemporary Asian artists.

In 2025, Yoshioka's debut graphic novel, Folk Remedy: Book 1, was published. It follows a Taishō-era apprentice apothecary who discovers the spirit world after meeting a mysterious yōkai. Folk Remedy 1 was nominated for the Russell Clark Award for Illustration and the NZSA Best First Book Award in the 2026 NZ Book Awards for Children and Young Adults.

== Bibliography ==
=== Graphic novels ===
- Folk Remedy: Book 1. Kansas City: Andrews McMeel Publishing. 2025.

=== Webcomics ===
- Circuits and Veins
