= NZSA Laura Solomon Cuba Press Prize =

The NZSA Laura Solomon Cuba Press Prize is an award for published and unpublished New Zealand writers. It is named after New Zealand writer Laura Solomon, who died in 2019, and funded by a gift from her family. It was first awarded in 2021.

== History ==
The NZSA Laura Solomon Cuba Press Prize is an award which celebrates and commemorates the life and work of New Zealand writer Laura Solomon.

Laura Solomon was a poet, novelist, playwright and software developer, and a long time member of NZSA. When she was 22, her first novel Black Light was published, but her writing career was later cut short by the diagnosis of a brain tumour. She died on 18 February 2019, aged 44.

The Prize was established and funded from a bequest from Laura Solomon and The Solomon Family in 2020. The announcement of the inaugural winner was made in 2021.

== Eligibility and conditions ==
The Prize is open to published or unpublished authors who have New Zealand citizenship or are permanent residents of New Zealand. It covers manuscripts from a wide range of genres including fiction, poetry, drama, creative non-fiction, and writing for children.

The judging criteria, as set by Laura Solomon, call for new writing with a “unique and original vision”. It is judged by a three-person panel consisting of one New Zealand literary figure and representatives from the Solomon family and The Cuba Press.

The winner is awarded a cash award of $1000 (as an advance) and a publishing contract with The Cuba Press.

== List of winners by year ==
- 2021: Lizzie Harwood, Polaroid Nights.
- 2022: Rachel Fenton, Between the Flags. Runner-up: Philippa Werry, Iris and Me.
- 2023: Lee Murray, Fox Spirit on a Distant Cloud. Runner-up: Melanie Kwang, Faultlines.
- 2024: Tracy Farr, Wonderland. Runner-up: Abigail von Ahse, Flawless.
- 2025: Susanna Elliffe, Relic Party. Runner-up: Belinda O’Keefe, Trespassers Will Be Baked, Scrambled, Fried and Eaten.

== See also ==
- List of New Zealand literary awards
