= Celia Allison =

New Zealand illustrator

- Born: 1958 (age 67–68) Canterbury, New Zealand
- Area: cartoonist
- Notable works: Cecily

Celia Allison (born 1958) is a New Zealand illustrator, best known for creating the character Cecily.

== Early life ==
Born in North Canterbury in 1958, Allison attended boarding school from the age of 10.

== Education ==
Allison has a Bachelor of Science from Otago University and a diploma in Visual Communication Design from Wellington Polytechnic.

Following her graduation Allison worked in illustration and graphic design in Wellington and in London. In 1988 Allison returned from Europe and started Moa Revival, a stationery company producing products with a notable emphasis on Kiwiana. In the late 1990s a cartoon about a single woman living alone began to take shape; by 2000 this hobby had gained enough attention to demand an audience of its own. The cartoon character was Cecily.

== Career ==
After graduating from Wellington Polytechnic, she worked "in illustration and graphic design in Wellington and in London". Since the late 1990s, Allison has been drawing the cartoon character of Cecily. She was inspired to create Cecily as a "representation of womanhood in New Zealand cartooning, which we didn’t have". Cecily first appeared in Next magazine, and has since appeared on a range of merchandise. From 2017, Cecily was syndicated in the American satirical magazine Funny Times.

She also creates the stationery range Moa Revival, and was a contributor to Three Words: An Anthology of Aotearoa/NZ Women's Comics.
