= Gareth Shute =

Gareth Hal Shute (born 1 September 1973) is a non-fiction author, musician and journalist from New Zealand.

== Career ==
Shute's first book, Hip Hop Music In Aotearoa was published in 2004, and won an award at the NZ book awards in 2005. He went on to write four more books: Making Music In New Zealand, Insights: New Zealand Artists Talk About Creativity, NZ Rock: 1987-2007 and Concept Albums. After taking a break from writing books for over a decade, in 2025 Shute returned with Songs From The Shaky Isles: A Short History Of Popular Music In New Zealand.

Shute has also been a music columnist for New Zealand Music Magazine and continues to write for the music history website, Audioculture.

Over this time, he was also a member of a number of local bands including: The Tokey Tones, The Ruby Suns, The Brunettes, The Cosbys, The Conjurors, Dictaphone Blues, and The Broken Heartbreakers. He currently plays in garage rock two-piece Fever Party and all-star quartet Thee Golden Geese
