= Maiangi Waitai =

New Zealand painter and artist (b. 1972)

Maiangi Waitai is a New Zealand-born artist. She works across a range of mediums, designing clothing and accessories for her Who is Dead Martin label, creating comics, figurines, toys, jewellery, mosaics and painting.

== Education and awards ==
Waitai received a Bachelor of Arts from Quay School of the Arts in Whanganui in 1999. The same year, she received a Te Waka Toi award from Creative New Zealand.

== Exhibitions ==
- Bowen Galleries, Wellington, 2000, 2002, 2004, 2006, 2007, 2012
- Tea Time (with Ron Dixon, Don Driver), Enjoy Gallery, Wellington, 22 October 2009 - 14 November 2009
- Ātea-ā-rangi - Interstellar, The Dowse, 15 Jun – 20 Oct 2019

== Personal life ==
Waitai is of Ngā Wairiki, Ngāti Apa, Tuwhāretoa, Rangitāne and German descent. She has worked as a kindergarten teacher since 2010. She has also been a musician, singing and playing the flute and guitar in a band called Beam (1997–1999) in Whanganui.
