= Whanganui School of Design =

Former tertiary education centre in Whanganui, New Zealand

Logo of Wanganui School of Design

The Whanganui School of Design (WSD) was a publicly funded tertiary institution that inhabited NZIA Heritage buildings on Taupo Quay in Whanganui, New Zealand. It is now part of the Universal College of Learning (UCOL).

== History ==
WSD was the first institute of its kind in New Zealand. It was established in 1987 by Professor Hazel Gamec on the Wanganui Regional Community Polytechnic Main Campus. It was known for its experimental work in both time-based and print-based disciplines of graphic design. The WSD was a national member of the Designers Institute of New Zealand (DINZ) and an international alumni design school speaker at A Gideas Conference held annually in Melbourne, Australia.

Over the years, the WSD has been located at the Wanganui Regional Community Polytechnic campus, the Westpac Building, the old Department of Conservation building, the Terrace House and UCOL on Rutland Street.

On 1 April 2001, the Wanganui Regional Community Polytechnic and Wanganui School of Design were integrated with UCOL.

== Awards ==
Recent awards the school has won:

2004 TUANZ E-vision awards

Graduate Ann-Ni Chee won the student category for her work "Design Playground ".

2004 Best Awards

- Student Graphic Design (Best of Category) – "To be shot in the front of the back of the head" by Andrew Hovey.

2005 Best Awards

- Student Interior Design (Best of Category) – "E=mc^{2} interactive exhibition: Adulthood" by Natasha Griffiths, Adam Harte, Kylie Duncan, Adelle Jurgens, and Yifan Niu.
- Student Graphic Design (Best of Category) – "Theye" by Fiyon Neau.
- Student Graphic Design (Highly Commended) – "Lucy's Dreams" by Jenna Fisher, Lu.
- Student Graphic Design (Finalists) – "Craftworks" by Yeoh Ying Hui.
- Student Graphic Design (Finalists) – "Incident Beauty" by Debbie Hahn.
- Student Graphic Design (Finalists) – "Manualfesto" by Shayna Quinn.

2006 Best Awards

- Student Website/Interactive Media (Best of Category) – "Rabbit Farm" by Lin Yew Cheang.

2007 Best Awards

- Student Graphic Design (Bronze) – "Leelah" by Jutharat Wongwiwatwaitaya.
- Student Website/Interactive Media (Bronze) – "Design Camp 8 Titles" by Tok Lee Heng and Wong Weng Wai.
- Student Website/Interactive Media (Bronze) – "NOUDS" by Brian Hainsworth.
- Student Website/Interactive Media (Bronze) – "Green RIG" by Thomas Pavitte and Emma Young.

2009 Best Awards

- Student Graphic Design (Bronze) – "Make the healthier choice the easier choice" by Barry Wylie.

1997 Rising Star - Collie Clan, “Make it Stop”, Form meets Funktion. Esp ref 1996-98
