= Sally Bollinger =

New Zealand actor, writer and cartoonist

- Born: 1993 (age 32–33)
- Areas: Cartoonist, Actor

Sally Bollinger is an actor, writer and cartoonist born in 1993 in New Zealand. She often works collaboratively with her sister Elsie on works relating to William Shakespeare and will contribute the comic component of joint comic/video projects.

== Creative work ==
=== YouTube ===
Along with Minnie Grace, Claris Jacobs and sister Elsie Bollinger, wrote, directed and produced a YouTube adaptation of the Shakespeare play Much Ado About Nothing, entitled Nothing Much To Do. Sally and Elsie grew up with Shakespeare stories and were also inspired by The Lizzie Bennet Diaries. They raised $23,000 for the project on a Kickstarter campaign.

=== Comics ===
Sally contributed to the comic components of an adaptation of Hamlet by The Candle Wasters, titled Tragicomic. The comics drawn by Sally are intended to represent those drawn by the protagonist Hannah Moore during the course of the series. This adaptation gender swapped the characters to make women more central, and also had more of a focus on mental health.

== Bibliography ==
- Three Words: An Anthology of Aotearoa/NZ Women's Comics (2016). Contributor.
