= Kerry Ann Lee =

New Zealand visual artist, designer, and academic

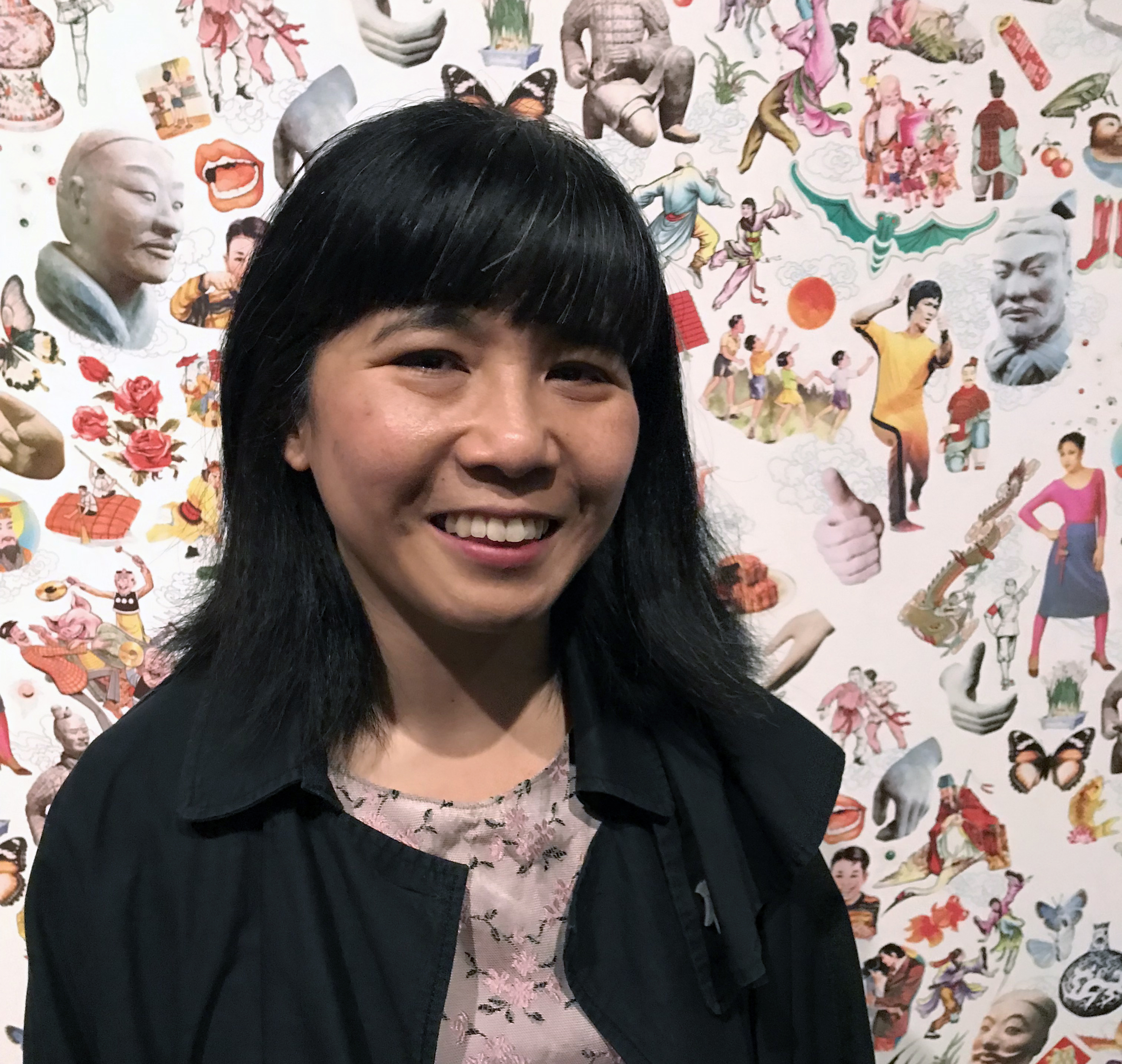
- Kerry Ann Lee at the opening of Return to Skyland at Te Papa, 13 December 2018
- Born: Wellington, New Zealand
- Known for: Visual arts, design

Kerry Ann Lee is a visual artist, designer, and scholar in design at Massey University College of Creative Arts, in Wellington, New Zealand.

== Practice ==
Kerry Ann Lee's art and design practice is rooted in her experience of being a New Zealander of Chinese descent, and frequently explores these cultural intersections. This includes topics such as Chinese settlement in the 19th century, particularly the establishment of Chinatowns and Cantonese urban diaspora communities in New Zealand. Lee is also known for her independent publishing work, especially zines, including Help, My Snowman’s Burning, Celebretard and Permanent Vacation. Lee started Red Letter Distro in 2001, a mail order service for Aotearoa New Zealand and international zines. Her practice frequently employs collage. Lee has undertaken international residencies in China, Taiwan, US, Mexico and Australia and exhibits regularly in New Zealand. Lee's 2017 solo exhibition, Fruits in the Backwater at Pātaka Art + Museum explores notions of identity and place, with juxtaposition of Chinese and New Zealand cultural signifiers a central theme. In December 2018, her installation Return to Skyland opened within the Terracotta Warriors: Guardians of Immortality exhibition at Te Papa.

Lee holds a master's degree from Massey University, with a thesis on the settlement of Chinese in New Zealand, through which she "interrogates the transformation of Cantonese settlers into Chinese New Zealanders through illustration design".

== Career ==
Lee held a senior lecturer and researcher position at Otago Polytechnic School of Design and is currently a senior lecturer at Massey University College of Creative Arts.

Lee has held artist-in-residence positions at island6 Art Centre, Shanghai (September 2009), and Visible City, a collaborative live art project hosted by the City of Melbourne as part of the Melbourne Fringe Festival (October 2010).

Lee was the creative director of the Asian Aotearoa Arts Huì (AAAH2018), a public festival and national gathering that celebrated "diverse expressions of ‘Asianness’ in Aotearoa in the Arts."

== Life ==
Lee is a third-generation Chinese New Zealander; her forebears arrived in Otago, New Zealand in the 1930s. She was born in Wellington, where her family has lived since the late 1940s; her parents ran the Gold Coin Cafe at 296 Willis Street from 1978 to 1986. The cafe was referenced in her installation The Unavailable Memory of Gold Coin Cafe, at Enjoy Gallery in 2013 and Pātaka Art + Museum in 2015.

Lee studied design in Wellington. She received a Master of Design (MDes) from Massey University, where her thesis project was the book Home Made: Picturing Chinese Settlement in New Zealand.

Lee is a DJ under the alias Croque Madame. She is also known for her interest in punk music and work with self-published fanzines.

== Awards ==
- 2014: RATA Award for Excellence in Teaching, Massey University, College of Creative Arts.
- 2012: Otago Polytechnic Inspiring Research Award.
- 2007: Asia New Zealand Emerging Researcher Award.
- June 2009: Fulbright Award to attend the Summer Residency Program at the School of Visual Arts (SVA) in New York City.

== Exhibitions ==
- Fruits in the Backwater, Pātaka Art + Museum, 27 August 2017 – 22 January 2018
- (Un)conditional I (group show), The Physics Room, 5–29 April 2018
- In Praise of Weird Wonders, Bartley + Company Art, Wellington, 2017
- Foreign Correspondence, Whitespace Contemporary, 2017
- Da Shi Jie/ The Great World: Shanghai Works 2009-2010 [大世界：2009-2010 创作于上海], Toi Pöneke Gallery, Wellington, 29 April – 20 May 2011
- AM PARK, am art space, 6 Xiangshan Road, Shanghai, China, 7–20 July 2010
- Home Made: Picturing Chinese Settlement in New Zealand, Toi Pōneke Gallery, Wellington, 31 July – 22 August 2008
