= New Ground (comics) =

New Zealand Comics

New Ground is a New Zealand comics anthology edited by Jeremy Bishop through DMC Comics. It features short comics from up-and-coming & established New Zealand artists and writers. It is one of two comic anthologies published in New Zealand (the other being Funtime Comics) and it aims to showcase the more "mainstream" side of New Zealand talent.

Editor Jeremy Bishop has encouraged new talent by publishing the collaborate work of secondary school art students.

== Contributors ==
The anthology has collected short comics from established and emerging New Zealand comics artists and writers, with roughly a dozen creators featured in each issue.

Covers have included work by Roger Langridge, Dylan Horrocks, Simon Morse, Ant Sang, and Cornelius Stone.
