= Kenzie Blackheart =

British Drag Queen and CEO of 'HotHaus Drag UK'

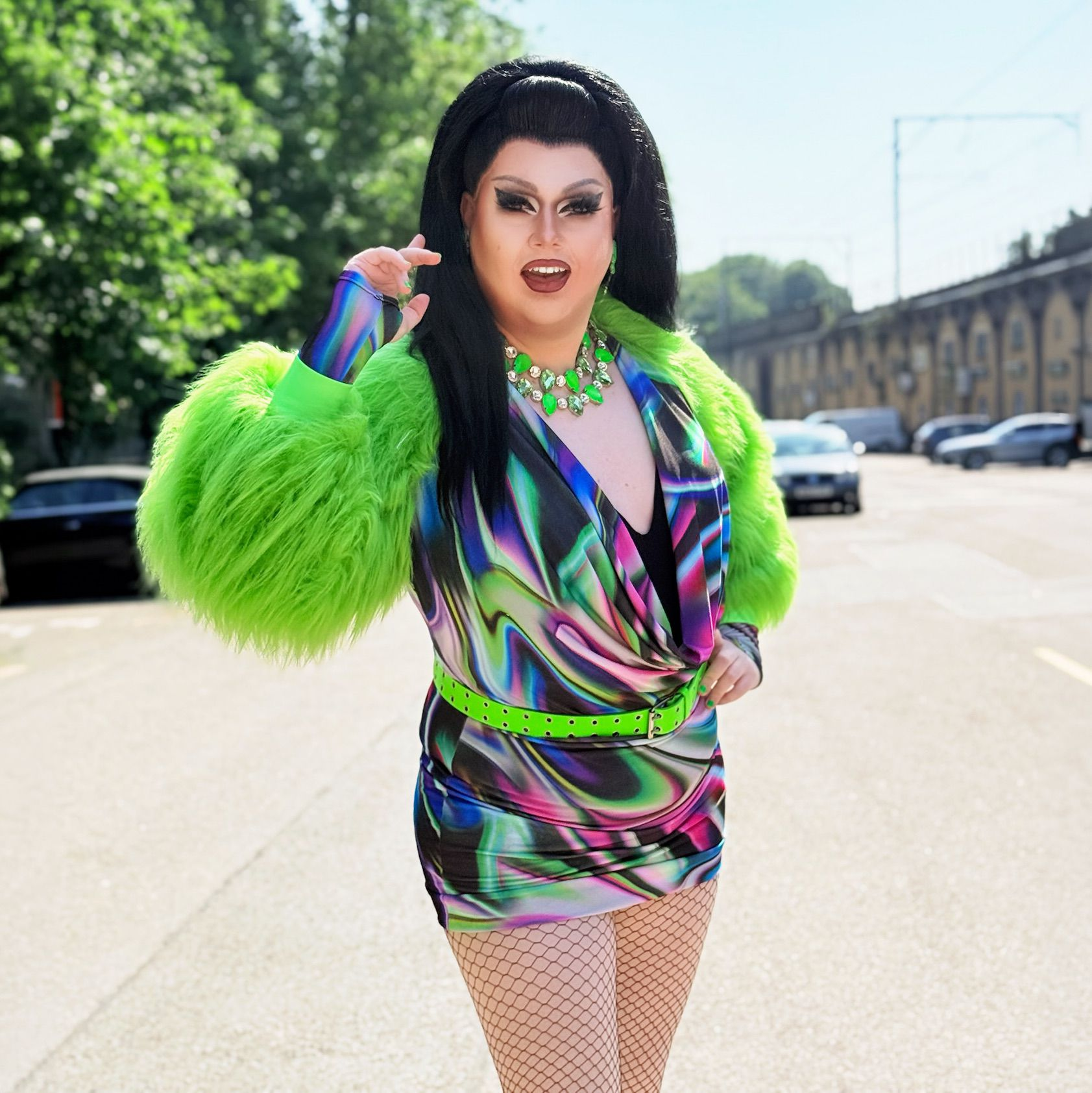
- Kenzie Blackheart in 2026
- Born: Matt Hunt; 7 March 1996 (age 30); Basildon, Essex
- Occupation: Drag Queen
- Years active: 2010 - present
- Known for: HotHaus Drag UK

Kenzie Blackheart is the stage name of Matt Hunt (born 7 March 1996), an English drag queen and costume and performance wear specialist who is known for being "The UK's Nuclear Bombshell of Drag" and for creating HotHaus Drag UK, an award-winning drag show regularly performed in Chelmsford and London. Kenzie has also performed in other independent shows, including Neurodelicious, and annual LGBTQ+ Pride events, such as Essex Pride, Basildon Pride, Colchester Pride and Southend Pride.

== Personal life ==
Hunt was born and raised in Basildon, Essex. Hunt started drag at the age of 14, initially performing as Lady Gaga, though later creating the aliases of Kitty Kensington and Kensi before their own character of Kenzie Blackheart. Hunt initially performed in a bar in Camden Town before creating HotHaus Drag during the Coronavirus pandemic.

Blackheart was nominated for Community Organisation Award for LGBT at the National Diversity Awards 2025 for their positive contribution to HotHaus Drag UK and the Chelmsford community.

In 2025, Blackheart created Atelier.BLACKHEART, a UK-based independent costume and performance wear studio and small fashion label, described on their social media as a drag-queen / queer owned stage & dance wear specialist focusing on bespoke and performance costume work for drag artists and stage performers and advertises custom commissions and bespoke performance wear.

== HotHaus Drag UK ==
HotHaus Drag UK was created by Kenzie during the Coronavirus pandemic and launched on 8 July 2021. HotHaus Drag UK aims to be a "home and safe space" for everyone, regardless of anyone's identities. The ethos of HotHaus, which can be heard during every show, demonstrates this by; ‘[operating] an environment built upon equality to everyone, love, respect, consent, and the enjoyment and safety to have a good time.'

In 2022, the company was a finalist in The Panic Awards in the 'Best Regular Night Of The Year' category.

In April 2023, the show hosted its own stage at Poptasia Festival in Basildon with Cheryl (Note: Cheryl is referred to as Cheryl Hole on UK series 1 and UK vs. the World series 1.) from RuPaul's Drag Race UK series 1, RuPaul's Drag Race: UK vs. the World series 1 and Canada's Drag Race: Canada vs. the World season 2 and Tia Kofi from RuPaul's Drag Race UK series 2 and winner of RuPaul's Drag Race: UK vs. the World series 2 performing alongside Jason Donovan, Tony Hadley, Liberty X and East 17.

In June 2023, HotHaus Drag UK created HotShots, a prestigious drag competition in the UK, aimed at discovering and showcasing emerging drag talent. Contestants compete for a cash prize, crown, sash, and the opportunity to join the HotHaus Family, a celebrated community of drag artists.

In March 2024, HotHaus Drag won the ‘Regular Night of the Year’ at The Panic Awards. In the July of that year, HotHaus Drag UK performed at Southend-on-Sea Pride 2024 alongside Crystal (drag queen) from RuPaul's Drag Race UK series 1.

In May 2025, HotHaus Drag hosted their 'Studio 88 Disco Night' at their home venue, HotBox Live Events, with their first RuPaul's Drag Race UK queen headlining as their special guest. Vanity Milan (from RuPaul's Drag Race UK series 3 and Canada's Drag Race: Canada vs. the World season 1) guest joined the cast, after Cheryl was unavailable to perform due to "circumstances out of control for all parties involved".

In November 2025, Kenzie launched 'HotCast: The Official HotHaus Drag Podcast', allowing one-to-one interviews with leading drag performers from across HotHaus Drag and the United Kingdom with audio and video. The series offers insight into each guest’s career and experiences through conversation, audience questions, and humour, delivering an entertaining and uplifting experience in the distinctive HotHaus style.. In June 2026, it was announced that the podcast was nominated for Local Podcast of the Year at the Panic Awards 2026.

== Awards and nominations ==
| Year | Ceremony | Award on behalf of | Category | Result | Ref |
|---|---|---|---|---|---|
| 2015 | Frankfurt Style Public Choice Awards | Themselves | Over the Rainbow | Nominated | |
| 2022 | The Panic Awards | HotHaus Drag UK | Best Regular Night Of The Year | Nominated | |
| 2024 | The Panic Awards | HotHaus Drag UK | Regular Night of the Year | Won | |
| 2026 | The Panic Awards | HotCast: The Official HotHaus Drag Podcast | Local Podcast of the Year | Nominated | |
| 2025 | National Diversity Awards | Themselves | Community Organisation Award for LGBT | Nominated | |
