= Lucy Meyle =

New Zealand multidisciplinary artist

Lucy Meyle is a New Zealand multidisciplinary artist. Her work includes drawing, print-making, painting, poetry, comics and zines. Her comics feature in the New Zealand comics Anthology Three Words.

== Education ==
Meyle holds a Masters of Art and Design from Auckland University of Technology. Her masters thesis was entitled No Longer/Not Yet: lacuna and dissemination in practice. In 2018 Meyle was awarded a PhD from the Auckland University of Technology. Her doctoral thesis was titled Does a Flower Rehearse for Spring?. From April 2020 Meyle has been employed as a lecturer in Art and Design at the Auckland University of Technology.

== Awards ==
- Auckland Zinefest Best in the Fest (2013)
- British School at Rome Wallace New Zealand Residence Award (2018)

== Exhibitions ==
- Looking forwards and backwards by Meyle and Ziggy Lever, Blue Oyster Art Project Space, Dunedin.
- Wallace Art Awards Exhibition of Winners and Travelling Finalists, September 2018 - November 2019
- March Mostra, British School at Rome, 16–23 March 2019.
- Auckland Art Fair, 24–28 February 2021.
