= Rosemary McLeod =

New Zealand writer, journalist, cartoonist and columnist

Rosemary McLeod ONZM
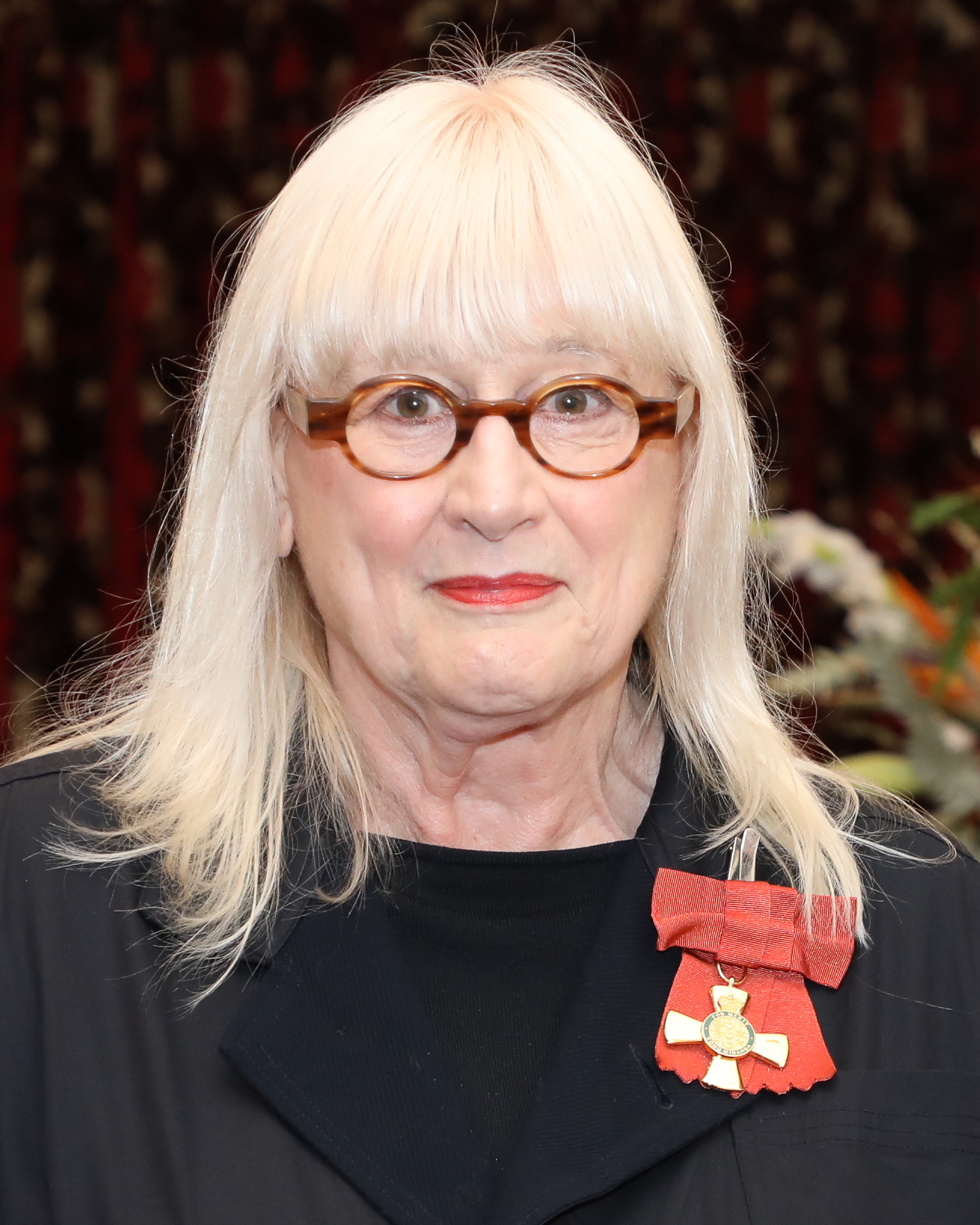
- McLeod in 2022
- Born: December 1949 (age 76); Masterton, New Zealand
- Occupations: Journalist, writer

Rosemary Margaret McLeod ONZM (born December 1949) is a New Zealand writer, journalist, cartoonist and columnist.

== Early life ==
McLeod was educated at Onslow College and Victoria University of Wellington.

== Career ==
McLeod began her career as a journalist in 1970, working for the Sunday Times in Wellington before moving to Eve magazine, where she was staff feature writer and fashion columnist She joined The Dominion in 1972, followed by stints at the NZBC as a radio reporter and at TV One as a news journalist.

Her profile rose with a longstanding, self-illustrated column for the New Zealand Listener, which ran from the early 1970s to 1988.

During a year in Sydney in 1976 as a contract sitcom writer with the ABC, McLeod worked on a comedy series with feminist themes, Who Do You Think You Are. Also in that year, she won the PEN International Best First Book of Prose award for her self-illustrated satirical novel A Girl Like I. On her return to New Zealand she worked as script editor for Joe and Koro, also devising an early TVNZ sitcom called All Things Being Equal. Other television work included Close to Home, Country GP and The Seekers.

Later, McLeod was the devisor and principal writer of the TV soap Gloss, which won the award for best TV drama in New Zealand in 1989.

Her work for New Zealand publications included investigative and long-form journalism for the monthly magazine North & South, for which she was five times named Qantas Feature Writer of the Year. McLeod was a longstanding opinion writer for the Sunday Star Times and subsequently for Stuff, one of New Zealand's leading news websites, with her weekly column also being published in the Dominion Post, The Press, The Waikato Times and The Timaru Herald. Her opinion writing was at times controversial. She was a columnist for the magazine Woman on its launch in 2020.

McLeod was a member of the Broadcasting Standards Authority for two terms, from 1995 to 2000.

She is a collector of New Zealand women's domestic textile crafts, and has published two books on the subject. The first, Thrift to Fantasy: Home Textile Crafts of the 1930s–1950s, won the history category of the Montana Book Award in 2006. The publication of her second book, With Bold Needle and Thread, was marked by her collection being shown in museums and art galleries around New Zealand.

McLeod also produces her own textile work, which has been exhibited at Bowen Galleries in Wellington and at Objectspace in Auckland.

In the 2022 New Year Honours, McLeod was appointed Officer of the New Zealand Order of Merit for services to journalism and television.

== Bibliography ==
- A Girl Like I (1976)
- Thank You for Having Me (1979)
- The Rosemary McLeod Bedside Book (1981) a collection of articles from The Listener
- Thrift to Fantasy: Home Textile Crafts of the 1930s–1950s (2006)
- With Bold Needle & Thread (2013)

== Awards ==
- PEN Best First Book of Prose (1976) A Girl Like I
- Jubilee Prize for Investigative Journalism (1986) for a North and South magazine article on a Wellington murder of a young woman.
- Best TV Drama (1989) Gloss
- Qantas Feature Writer of the Year (five times, in 1986 and 1990 to 1993) for articles in North and South.
