= Sarah Laing =

New Zealand author and cartoonist

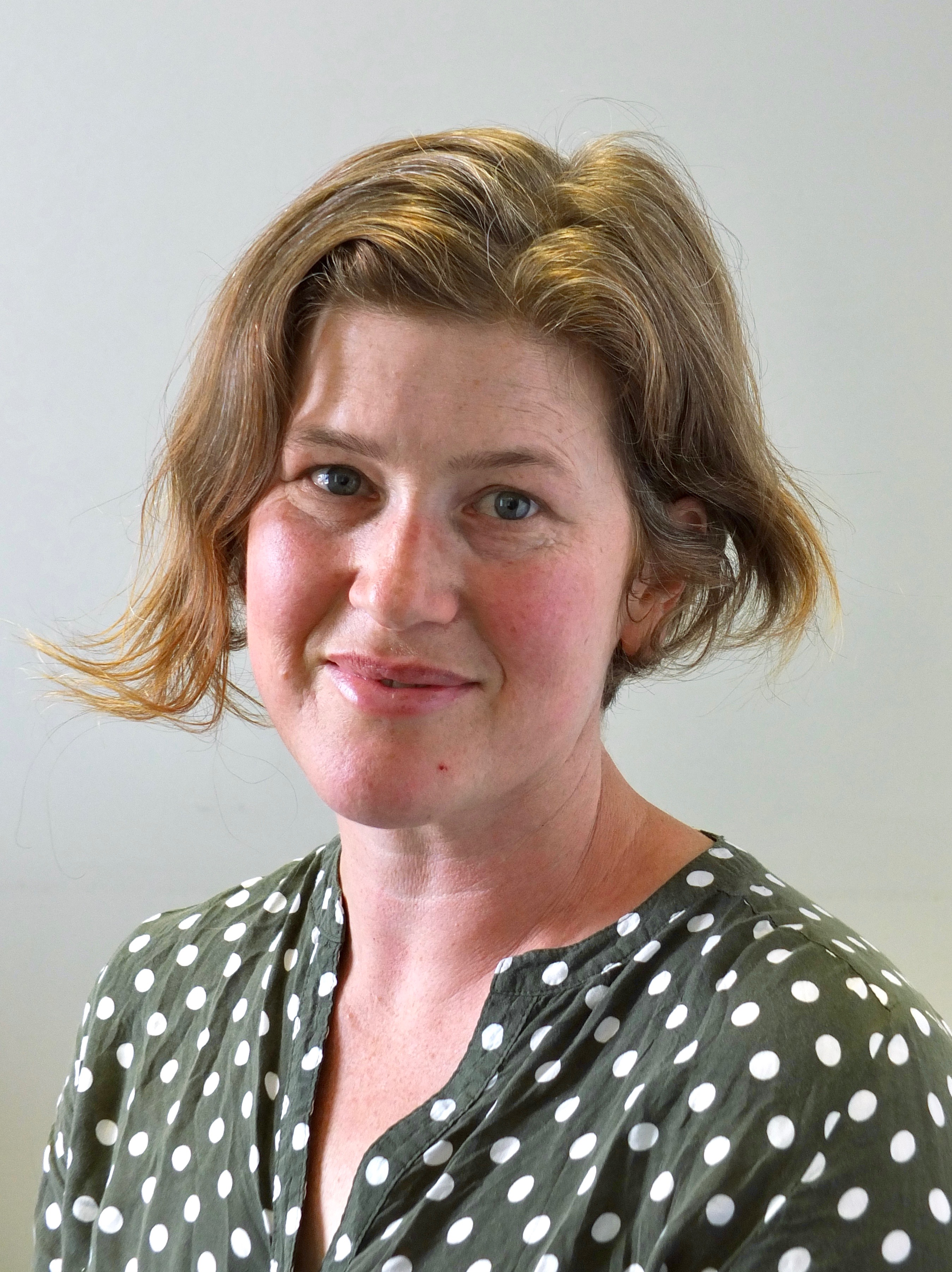
- Laing at the National Library of New Zealand in 2019
- Born: 1973 (age 52–53); Champaign-Urbana, Illinois, U.S.
- Writing career
- Language: English
- Genres: Cartoons, illustration, poetry, fiction
- Notable works: Three Words: An Anthology of Aotearoa/NZ Women's Comics, Mansfield and Me: a Graphic Memoir
- Website: Blog, Let Me Be Frank

Sarah Laing (born 1973) is a New Zealand author, graphic novelist and graphic designer.

== Background ==
Laing was born in 1973 in Champaign-Urbana, Illinois, United States and grew up in Palmerston North, New Zealand. As a teenager she moved to Wellington and has also lived in Germany, New York, and Auckland. She is currently based in Wellington.

== Career ==
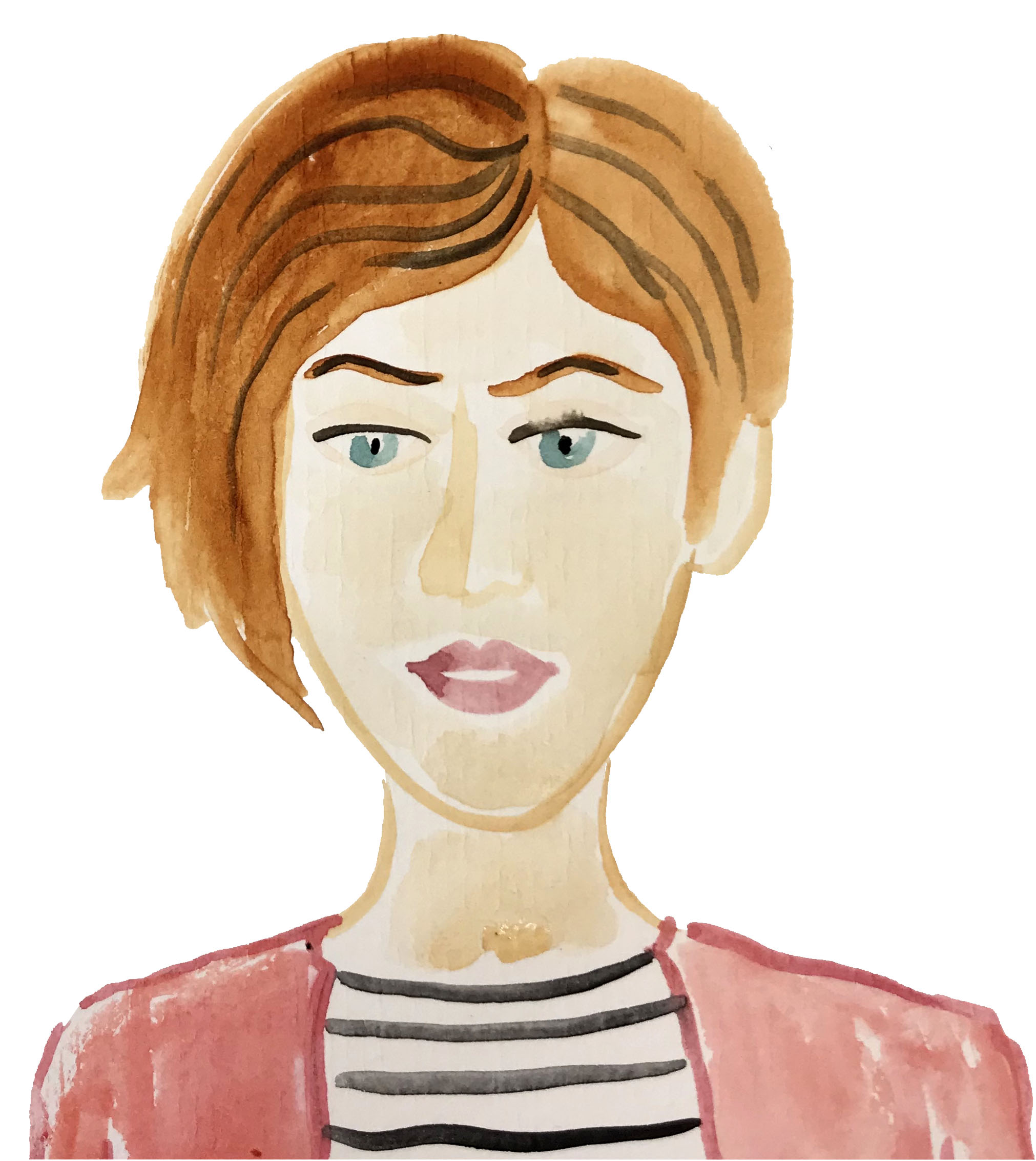
Self-portrait, 2018

Laing has a background in graphic design and worked as an illustrator. She completed a master's degree at Unitec in 2016. She illustrated Macaroni Moon, a children's poetry book by Paula Green.

In 2007, she published her first collection of short stories, Coming up Roses. Her first novel, Dead People’s Music, was published in 2009. She is also the author of the short story ebook Inside a Pomegranate.

Following her time at the Sargeson Centre, she wrote and illustrated her second novel, The Fall of Light.

In 2016, she published the memoir Mansfield and Me: a Graphic Memoir (Victoria University Press), using the life and work of Katherine Mansfield to reflect on her own experiences; it was described as "part biography of Katherine Mansfield, part autobiography, and part account of her nagging insecurity about her own abilities." The Times Literary Supplement said of the UK edition (Lightning Books): "Her watercolour-washed drawings delight us."

With Rae Joyce and Indira Neville, Laing was the co-editor of Three Words: An Anthology of Aotearoa/NZ Women's Comics, published in 2016.

In 2019, she published Let Me Be Frank (Victoria University Press), an anthology of her comics dating back to 2010, in which she documented the breakdown of her marriage. Again, a UK edition was published by Lightning Books.

== Awards ==
In 2006, Laing won the 2006 Sunday Star-Times Short Story Competition.

Laing was a writer-in-residence at the Michael King Writers Centre in 2008 and 2013. With Sonja Yelich she received the 2010 Grimshaw Sargeson Fellowship.

Mansfield and Me: a Graphic Memoir was long listed in the Illustrated non-fiction category of the 2017 Ockham New Zealand Book Awards.

== Work ==
- Coming Up Roses (short stories), 2007
- Dead People's Music, 2009
- The Fall of Light, Vintage, 2013, ISBN 9781775533030
- Mansfield and Me, 2016
- Three Words: an anthology of Aotearoa/New Zealand Women's Comics, 2016
- Let Me Be Frank, 2019
- Sylvia and the Birds: How the Bird Lady Saved Birds and How You Can, Too, 2022
