= Rae Joyce =

New Zealand comics artist and editor (born 1976)

- Born: Rachel J. Fenton; 1976 (age 49–50) Yorkshire, England
- Notable works: Three Words: An Anthology of Aotearoa/NZ Women's Comics (with Sarah Laing and Indira Neville

Rachel Fenton, also known as Rae Joyce (born 1976), is a graphic novel artist and author from New Zealand.

Born Rachel J. Fenton in 1976, in Yorkshire, she moved to New Zealand in 2007. She currently uses the pen name Rae Joyce.

Joyce graduated from Sheffield Hallam University in 2007 with a BA in English Studies.

With Sarah Laing and Indira Neville, Joyce is the co-editor of Three Words: An Anthology of Aotearoa/NZ Women's Comics.

In 2013 she won the 7th Annual Short Fiction Prize (in association with Plymouth University). She won the 2013 Flash Frontier Winter Award for excellence in writing.

She was the runner up for the 2014 Dundee International Book Prize and her poem "Amazon" was longlisted for the Fish Publishing International Poetry Prize. She was also shortlisted for The Royal Society of New Zealand Manhire Prize and won the 2011–2012 AUT New Zealand Creative Writing Competition prize for short graphic fiction.

In 2014 she was selected to be part of the Graphic Novelist Exchange (organised by Publishers Association of New Zealand, the Taipei Book Fair Foundation, and the New Zealand Book Council), alongside Tim Gibson and Ant Sang. This led to the collaborative book Island to Island with Tapei-based artists Sean Chuang, 61Chi and Ahn Zhe.

Joyce is featured in the Hicksville Press directory of New Zealand cartoonists and comics creators, New Zealand Comics and Graphic Novels. In 2022, she won the NZSA Laura Solomon Cuba Press Prize with her novel Between the Flags which was published by Cuba Press.
