= Darren Schroeder =

New Zealand editor

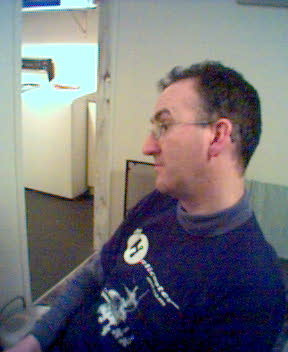
Schroeder at the Funtime Comics Midwinter Comics Retreat, 2006

Darren Schroeder's mini comic Mopy #14 published in 2006

Darren Phillip Schroeder (born 27 August 1967 in Christchurch, New Zealand) is a Small Press editor, critic, stand-up comedian, and comics creator. He is best known for founding the Register of New Zealand Comics, editing the Small press section of the Comics Bulletin website and as long-standing editor of the Funtime Comics anthology Funtime Comics Presents. He also creates his own popular semi-autobiographical mini comic Mopy

== Biography ==
Darren Schroeder is a pākehā from Christchurch, New Zealand who is now living in Devon, England. He learnt to read through exposure to Donald Duck comics, and later on the work of Keith Giffen on Justice League International inspired him to return to his comic reading habit.

His interest turned to locally produced comics, and even though they were done on a small scale he thought they were just as good, if not better, than most of the imported stuff he encountered.

== Editorship at Funtime Comics ==
He became involved in the New Zealand comic collective Funtime Comics at its inception in 1991, but did not take up editorship of the Funtime Comics Presents anthology until 1993 with the publication of Issue #5. He was known for a very inclusive editorial policy, "Everyone's got a story to tell, and everyone can draw comics." His long-standing editorship finished with his move to England in February 2007, and Issue #22 and #23 have been published under new editor Isaac Freeman.

== Small Press reviewing ==
Darren Schroeder took up editorship of the Small Press section of the international Comics Bulletin website when the site launched in 2000. He is also a critic/writer for the international publications Comic Edge, Comic Quarterly, and various websites such as Comics Australia (the former seminal site for Australian comics ).

== His own Comic Mopy ==
Comics reviewer Tim Bollinger wrote that Darren's mini-comic, Mopy: "...veers wildly from heartfelt autobiographical narratives to bad throwaway puns, with naïve, scratchy but immediate drawings that shout sincerity into the gaping abyss of popular cultural indifference".

== Acknowledgements ==
He was interviewed about his contribution to the New Zealand comics scene by Shirley Horrocks in her documentary The Comics Show. He was also interviewed on New Zealand's National Radio.

In 2006 the Kiwi Comics site (featuring the Register of New Zealand Comics) that Darren Schroeder created and maintains was acknowledged in two independent New Zealand comics awards.

- 2006 Gibson Award winner Favourite Web Related Material
- 2006 Black River Digital Eric Award winner Best Comics Related Website

He was also acknowledged by the tongue-in-cheek First Annual Funtime Comics Award 2002 as the joint winner of The Funtimes Extreme Award for best contribution to community singing.

== Other activities ==
In addition to his comics interests, until recently Darren Schroeder was an active committee member of the Canterbury Film Society. His involvement in visual culture extends to television, and he also maintains a web site about New Zealand television history.

== Sources ==
- http://www.comics.org.nz
- http://www.comicsbulletin.com
- http://www.lonely.geek.nz
