= Futurians (band) =

New Zealand sci-fi punk band

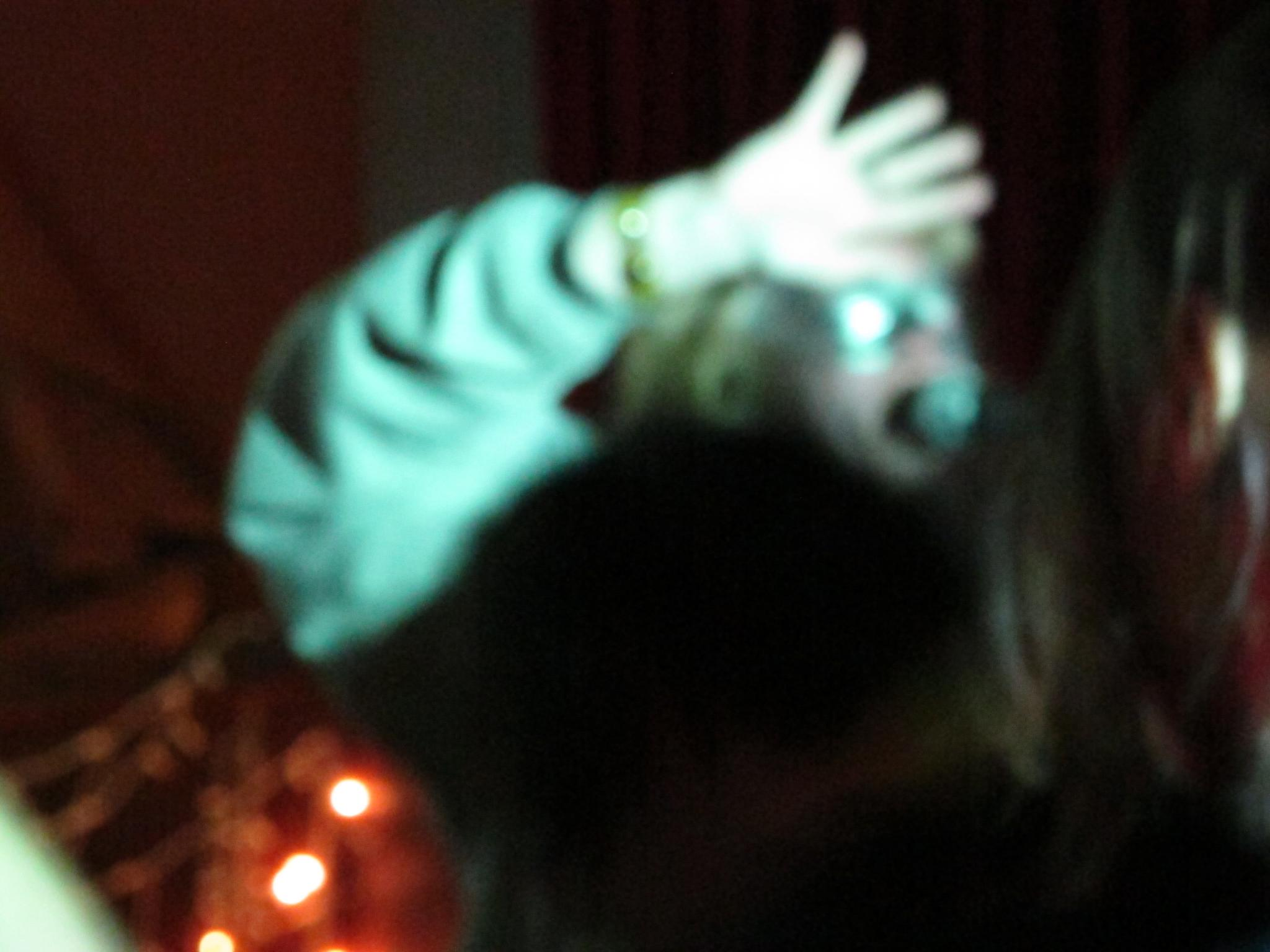
- The Futurians at Lines of Flight, Port Chalmers, 2011, by Sheridan Dickson

Background information
- Origin: Dunedin, New Zealand
- Genres: Noise rock, sci-fi punk
- Years active: 2001–present
- Label: Heavy Space Records
- Members: Ducklingmonster; CJA the Pirate; ISO-12; Rocko Mandroid
- Past members: Kraus
- Website: the-futurians.tumblr.com

Futurians are a New Zealand sci-fi punk band formed in Dunedin in 2001. Foxy Digitalis magazine called them the "best punk band on the fucken planet."

== Style ==
They have a distinctive retro-futuristic visual style. Their Power / Reactor single was released inside a 16-page full colour book of artworks and collages by the band, with a DVD compiling music videos from 2003 to 2013.

Their music has been described as drawing influence from digital rock, funk, minimalism, no wave, new wave, Brian Wilson, krautrock, noise music, disco, lo-fi, art rock, punk rock, dirges, riot grrrl, doom rock, and drone rock. Both musically and lyrically, the band's songs contain retro-futuristic sci-fi-related themes. They have been called "torn-down semi-punk skiffle", "the sound of gay robots disco dancing and crushing everything underfoot", taser-war stomp, overamped, "moto-beat wiggy-fuzz-workout", "as raw as a skinned knee", sounding "like a banshee funeral for Brian Wilson's cyborg clone", "armed with nuclear weapons of sonic dust", pure mayhem, "the remnants of space debris raining down on the green hills of New Zealand", a "lo-fi art rock nightmare", "space-tinged garage sludge" and "bent punk wizardry".

Their music is often recorded in low fidelity. One reviewer said, "the only way you'd achieve less fidelity is if you converted to punch-card and faxed to yourself."

== Formation and membership ==
Ducklingmonster (Beth Dawson) and CJA the Pirate (Clayton Noone) were playing in Dunedin as BC. In 2001, drummer Pat Kraus joined and named them the Futurians. He left after recording their first album, and ISO-12 (Jason Aldridge) and Rocko Mandroid (Sean Norling) were recruited soon afterwards on synth and drums respectively. Stefan Neville of Pumice was later an interim member, and Antony Milton played a space-y game onstage once.

== Festivals ==
They have played at many New Zealand festivals; including Lines of Flight, Meatwaters, the Dunedin Fringe Festival, Rising Tides Festival, Deathstar Disco XXXIII, and Swallow Your Words.

== Covers ==
The Futurians have covered The Rolling Stones, Joy Division, Human Instinct, Grace Jones, Boney M., Robots in Disguise, The Troggs, the Timelords, Hasil Adkins, Billy Joel, Iggy Pop, Tivol and Gary Glitter.

== Other activities ==
=== Rocko Mandroid ===
Rocko Mandroid has played in Near Death Experience, Elixir in Flux, Dickthephone, Invisible Axe, Rampage, Double Date, Good Bugs Bad Bugs, Wolfskull and Voodoo Gangster. He currently records and performs under the name NVSBLX and was the manager of Radio One 91FM between 2010 and 2023. Mandroid was responsible for curating and producing the six Urban Serpent magazine and music compilation releases between 1999 and 2003. He is one of the co-founders of the Lttl Paisly label in Dunedin, which specialises in handcrafted small run music releases, fashion creation, graphic design and screen printing. He is the founder of the Ōtepoti Music blog, which archives and promotes music made in Dunedin, New Zealand, and in 2023, founded the Ōtepoti Culture Guide, a periodic publication highlighting music, art, and events in Ōtepoti.

=== Ducklingmonster ===
Ducklingmonster is a DJ, cartoonist, fashion designer, curator, visual artist, zine maker, cultural engineer, video artist, fine artist, and radio show host. She performs music solo with beats, lights, vocals, good manners and home-made electronics from the Musical Electronics Library. Her solo shows have been called authoritative, with precise and fearless dancing. As part of the "No Venues" concept, Ducklingmonster shows are often staged in unconventional spaces such as public parks, back yards and church stoops. This was born of a frustration of having a stage create a barrier between the performer and the audience, and barriers encountered between art practice and commercial and institutional venues. Her Society for Cutting Up Venues Manifesto outlines the philosophy behind the No Venues concept. She is a core member of the Uniform Collective, a central Auckland women's art collective that organises art shows, parties, and a magazine. The collective aims to enable more community interaction and is interested in ideas of place, community and feminism in their neighbourhood.

Ducklingmonster also plays in File Folder and the Maltese Falcons and has played in It Hurts, Bugz on Film, Uniform, Octopus, the Ghastlies, Rise of the City Cat Cult, Panda Battle Battle Panda, LD50, the Shutups, Static, Zombie!Fuck?, 5 Satans, Richard and the Hadlees, Vulcan Steel, the Windups, the Murdering Monsters, and Evidence X.

=== CJA ===
CJA has played in Armpit, Armice Pumb Pit, Vulcan Steel, International Tall Dwarfs, Freejoas, Claypipe, Spacewolf 2, Horsehead Nebula, the Strange Girls, Sundowner, Naked Sailors, Wolfskull, Jorts, Behemothaur, je serai une tombe, Invisible Axe, Alien Space Wreck, and the Ideal Gus. He has recorded a large number of solo albums and runs the Heavy Space Records, Little Robots Rule, Looking for Love and Root Don Lonie for Cash record labels. He is also a comic artist and created the City of Tales series with Stefan Neville. CJA DJs on Radio One on his weekly show, Very Heavy, Very Heavy.

=== ISO12 ===
ISO12 mainly plays Korg MS-20 in futurianz – other bands past and present include Mink, Murderbike, Wolfskull, Freejoas, Vulcan Steel, Mental Health Triangle, Laser Cooling, and Murdabike; and also performs freestyle hiphop. He helps run the STeeP STReeT fashion label.

== Discography ==
=== Albums ===
- ! Blastov ! CD (2002)
- Projektor CD (2002)
- Exterminate! CD (2003)
- Live! (in the City) in CD (2003)
- Automatic Eyebrow CD (2004)
- Radio Futurian CD (2004)
- Faktory! CD (2004)
- Robots in Disguise CD (2004)
- Subway Songs double-CD (2004)
- Pimp My Tardis CD (2005)
- Evil Dead double-CD (2005)
- Programmed LP (2005)
- Ro-Jams CD
- Spock Ritual CD (2006)
- Dogs in Helmets CD (2006)
- Rojaws/Devil Dog From Mars Video CD (2006)
- Space Junk CD (2006)
- Live Trash Music DVD (2006)
- Zombie Chew CD (2007)
- Dead Astronauts Live Futurians CD (2008)
- Crashing Metal CD (2008)
- Rulz Mega-city OK!!! CD (2010)
- Chaos Manner 300 gram LP (2011)
- Too Hot! (2016)
- Boombox! (2016)
- Programmed (2018)
- Distorted Living (2018)

=== Singles and EPs ===
- In 3D! Mini CD (2002)
- 2000AD! Mini CD (2004)
- Turbo Lover Mini CD (2004)
- Pigs in Space Mini CD (2004)
- Dark Figures Mini CD
- Guerre Stellari Mini CD
- Exhibition Mini CD
- Computer Says No Mini CD (2005)
- X/XX Mini CD (2005)
- Kicking You Down, Planet Gone 7-inch (2006) – split with Dick The Phone.
- No Disintegration Mini CD
- Red Light Mini CD (2007)
- Zenit Mini CD (2007)
- Play The Breathtaking Sounds of Tivol 7-inch (2008)
- Storming the Citadel Mini CD (2009)
- What Have We Here? 7-inch (2010)
- Lando Mini CD (2010) – named after Lando Calrissian.
- Galaxial, That's Right, Galaxial! Mini CD (2011)
- !!!! (Faktory CD Out-takes) EP digital download (2011)
- Urban Chaos 7-inch EP (2011)
- "Power" / "Reactor" 7-inch (2013)
- The Futurians / Vlubä split 7-inch (2013)
- Spacies 7-inch (2014)
- Disco Blast! (Blasted Disco) 7-inch (2014)
- The Grooveyard EP (2017)
- Atuan 7-inch (2020)

=== Cassettes ===
- Book of the Dead (2003) – comes with a floppy disk.
- This Sucker is Nuclear Free!!! (2004)
- Hybrid Attack (2005)
- Vulcan Mindfuck / Don't Worry, Frank, There's A Baby on the Way (2006) – split with Armpit
- Rise of the City Cat Cult / The Futurians – split with Rise of the City Cat Cult
- Jawhol Yoko! (2006)
- Untitled Space Junk (2007)
- Spacefreight (2010)
- Some Assembly Required (2011)
- Pot (2012)
- Live at Lines 2011 (2014)
- A C E (Cool It) (2015)
- PMM# Futurians – LTA (2018)
- Coolies/The Futurians (2018)

=== Compilation appearances ===
- Arc Death CD (2001)
- Animals 2CD (2003)
- Radio One 2004 CD (2004)
- 267 Purkkia Liimaa CD (2004)
- Wailing Bones Volume Two CD (2005)
- Love Missile F2-67 CD (2006)
- Nummer 2 CD (2006)
- Arbor CD (2006)
- Pink Gold cassette (2006)
- Harmony of the Squares Volume 1 CD (2007)
- JK Tapes 1 2cassette (2007)
- Frannce 3CD (2007)
- Compact Listen CD (2009)
- The Futurians vs Horror Magnet XIIIXIII 13:13 Thirteen Thirteen CD (2009)
- Dirt Beneath the Daydream CD (2009) – free with White Fungus and The Wire magazines.
- I Refuse to Take Heavy Drugs, Therefore I am Banned from Certain Establishments 2CD (2010)
- Now that's what I call Zealand – Volume 2 CD (2010)
- Red Don Mini CD (2010)
- I'll Hang with God, but Not Today : A Dub Ditch Picnic Benefit Release cassette (2014)
- 402 (Now Zealand #3) (2014)
- You're Not Invited: New Zealand's Underground, 2010-2015 triple-album (2015)
