= Comics Bulletin =

Website with an emphasis on the American comic book industry

- Screenshot of Comics Bulletin main page, December 5, 2011
- Website type: Comic book
- Available in: English
- Predecessor: Silver Bullet Comics
- Owner: Ashley Hurst
- Creator: Jason Brice
- Editor: Ashley Hurst
- Website: comicsbulletin.com
- Registration: Yes
- Launched: January 2000
- Current status: Active

Comics Bulletin is a daily website covering the comic-book industry.

== History ==
=== Silver Bullet Comicbooks ===
In January 2000, New Zealand–based publisher/editor Jason Brice founded then named Silver Bullet Comicbooks.

During this period, the site made efforts to support retired comics professionals. In a Silver Bullet column called Past Masters, contributor Clifford Meth wrote about his efforts to support ailing comic book artist Dave Cockrum. As a result of his advocacy, Marvel Comics announced it would compensate Cockrum for his work in co-creating the X-Men. In 2005, Silver Bullet partnered with Aardwolf Publishing to publish a benefit book in support of ailing comics writer/artist William Messner-Loebs. Silver Bullet provided free advertising and promotion of the project on their site. Silver Bullet Comicbooks published the last issue of Phil Hall's Borderline Magazine online for free. Interviewer Rik Offenberger took his unpublished interviews from Borderline Magazine to Silver Bullet Comicbooks when after Borderline closed down and eventually served as the Senior Feature Editor.

Former Managing Editor Craig R. Johnson became associated with Dave Sim's controversial views on feminism when he stepped into a debate between Sim and the Friends of Lulu board of directors to defend freedom of expression in the comic book industry.

=== Comics Bulletin ===
On January 14, 2008, the site was relaunched as Comics Bulletin, to avoid confusion with the comics retailer Silver Bullet Comics. Comics blogger Johanna Draper Carlson suggested the name-change as a result of pressure from the unrelated but same-named retailer, "...since SBC had a US trademark registration".

In the same year, Jason Sacks took over from Keith Dallas as editor-in-chief for the site, and revamped the design and attitude. He eventually bought the site outright in 2011. The site debuted a podcast in 2011, called "Comics You Can Dance To", alongside a number of new columns. Writers for the site in 2015 included Kate Leth and Don McGregor.

Jason Sacks stepped away from Comics Bulletin in 2016. It was then owned by Kyle Garret until 2017, after which it was owned by Daniel Gehen.

In August 2021, Comics Bulletin was placed on hiatus.

In January 2025, Comics Bulletin was revived by Ashley Hurst.

== Regular features ==
- "Leading Questions" by Mark Stack and Chase Magnett
- "ICYMI – Small Press Comics Criticism and Whatnot" by Daniel Elkin
- "Singles Going Steady", a weekly review roundup by Daniel Gehen and the site's contributors
- "What Looks Good" by Matt Spatola and Kyle Garret
- "Comics Grind and Rewind" by Zack Davisson
- "Comics You Can Dance To", the site's podcast, hosted by Nathaniel MacDonald and Danny Djeljosevic
- "The Squeaky Wheel" by the pseudonymous kyrax2
- "Kate Or Die" by Kate Leth
- "Riding Shotgun" by Don McGregor
- "Killing Jokes" by Steve Morris, which explores the use of humor in comics
- "Comicbook Biography" by Rik Offenberger
- "Fool Britannia" by Regie Rigby
- "Manifesto" by Jason Sacks, an editorial column
- "Cool Art, Bro" by Michelle Six, which looks at the role of art in bringing comics to life
- "Busted Knuckles" by Beau Smith
- "Kryptonite Got You Down?" by Alison Stevenson, a faux dating advice column for superheroes

== Columnists ==
- Donna Barr: "Submission Engine"
- Tom Brevoort: "Brevoort's History of Comics"
- Rich Johnston: "All The Rage"
- Tony Lee: "He's Only a Writer... and It's More than Just a Comic"
- Bill Messner-Loebs: "Storytelling"
- Clifford Meth: "Meth Addict"
- Jimmy Palmiotti and Justin Gray: "Two In The Chamber"
- Bob Rozakis: "The Answer Man"
- Buddy Scalera: "Hey, Buddy!"
- Brandon Thomas: "Ambidextrous"
- Marv Wolfman: "What Th--?"
- Darren Schroeder: "Small Press Printed Matter"
- John Hays: “Silver Soapbox”

== Awards ==
As Silver Bullet Comic Books, the site has been the recipient of a number of awards and award nominations, including:

- 2004 Eagle Award nomination for "Favourite Comics E-Zine"
- 2005 Eagle Award winner for "Favourite Comics-Related Website"
- 2006 Eagle Award nomination for "Favourite Comics-Related Website"
- 2006 Gibson Comic Awards nominated for "Favourite Web Related Material"
