= Indira Neville =

Comics artist and editor

- Born: 1973 (age 52–53)
- Areas: Artist, educationalist
- Notable works: Nice Gravy, Three Words
- Awards: Microsoft Innovative Teacher Award (2005)

Indira Neville (born 1973) is a New Zealand comics artist, community organiser, musician and educationalist. She is notable for her work in the Hamilton-based comics collective Oats Comics, her own long running serial comic Nice Gravy and in recent times taking a prominent role in the promotion and recognition of New Zealand women's comics through her association with the Three Words anthology. Indira Neville is also notable for her work as an educationalist. She was a CORE Education eFellow, a winner of a Microsoft Innovative Teacher Award for her teaching, and a former principal of a primary school. She is also an active performer, and is currently fronting the Auckland band The Biscuits.

== Biography ==
Neville began her career working in television production after graduating from Auckland University of Technology in 1993. After gaining a graduate diploma in teaching in 1997, Neville worked in the field of primary education. She became recognised for her educational work in ICT and eLearning, and was principal of Mulberry Grove School, on Great Barrier Island, New Zealand. She is currently a teacher at Glen Eden Intermediate School in Auckland.

She has appeared in numerous New Zealand and Australian exhibitions and anthologies, including Oats, Dad and Tracy, My Soiled Sample, Pictozine, Tiny Peeks, Blood and Thunder, My Life as a Mega-rich Bombshell, and Loser Gurrl. Her work has also appeared in the mainstream magazines f*INK, Pavement, Loose, and Werewolf, and she is a regular contributor to the published Melbourne comics periodical Dailies.

== Oats Collective ==
Oats Comics was established in 1993 in Hamilton, New Zealand. Neville began drawing mini comics, both solo and in collaboration with fellow Oats creators Clayton Noone and Stefan Neville, her brother. She contributed to Oats collective publications, including Dad and Tracy and The Hood, as well as their exhibitions. In 2005 they held an exhibition entitled A Fist or a Club or Something at Special Gallery, in Customs St. East, Auckland, and here she launched her solo comic book I am a Comic. She started her most notable solo comic Nice Gravy while a member of Oats Comics collective.

== Nice Gravy ==
From 1994 Neville wrote and drew the serial comic Nice Gravy which ran for fifteen issues. It is acknowledged by Te Ara: The Encyclopedia of New Zealand as one of a growing number of New Zealand women's comics produced in the 1990s and 2000s. Copies of her comics are held in important library collections around the world, including Duke University's Sallie Bingham Center for Women's History and Culture Zine Collections and Alexander Turnbull Library.

== Three Words ==
In mid-2014 Indira Neville joined up with New Zealand graphic novelists, writers and fellow comics artists Rachel Fenton and Sarah Laing. They set about to develop the first anthology of New Zealand women's comics in a book format. The anthology "...will incorporate both existing and new work. We want to make visible the depth and breadth of New Zealand women’s comics; showing off some of the beautiful, amazing and often-unseen women’s comics of the past, as well as providing an opportunity for collaboration and the creation of new book-specific pieces via the Three words concept". The book attracted funding from the New Zealand public arts funder Creative New Zealand. The Three Words project has also proved to be a catalyst for promoting the work of New Zealand women comics artists and writers through their blog and Facebook group. The project has resulted in some controversy, as it has highlighted the marginalisation of women in New Zealand comics (as discussed on National Radio by Adrian Kinnaird, editor of From Earth's End: The Best of New Zealand Comics). Square Planet Comics publisher Tara Black argues for the importance of the Three Words project because it will help to address "the invisibility of the work of women in the creative sphere" by existing "...forever as documented evidence of women producing comics".

== Career in education ==
Neville has had an extensive career in education. Gaining a teaching diploma in 1997, in 1999 she was an ICT specialist teacher in Glen Eden Intermediate School, Auckland. She was later principal of Mulberry Grove School on isolated Great Barrier Island, New Zealand, a primary school with a strong focus on ICT and initiator of the Great Barrier Island ICT professional development cluster. Neville was actively involved in this cluster, whose aims are to connect the educational organisations on the island, "...developing a shared vision that runs through early childhood, primary and secondary schooling, and working cooperatively to achieve it". During her time as a principal she produced the blog 100 School Demons: All the Things that Fascinate and Vex the Principal. On this blog Neville adapts an ancient Japanese drawing exercise in which an artist attempts to illustrate 100 demons. She posted cartoons used in the Mulberry Grove School newsletter that depict strange beasts inspired by the things she found vexing and fascinating in her job as principal. This included Nits as Demon #4, Forgetting my Lunch as Demon #11 and Parents who yell at me as Demon #19.

Neville has also been influential outside of school. In 2005, she was an eFellow on the CORE Education eFellowship scheme, and awarded contestable funding to carry out research as part of The New Zealand Ministry of Education e-Learning Strategy. She published a report of her project entitled What impact can the use of high-end software have on the creativity of gifted under-achievers?. That same year, she was awarded a Microsoft Innovative Teacher Award. From this work she was invited to deliver a CORE Education EDtalk in 2009 called Key competencies as edupunk. This talk considers the possibilities for developing a local school curriculum and the introduction of the key competencies within the New Zealand Curriculum. EDtalks are advertised as "Interviews, discussions, and presentations from thought leaders, innovative educators, and inspirational learners". She has also published educational resources for teachers on topics such as ICT and the Visual Arts in the Classroom (2004), An introduction to multimedia in the classroom (2004) and Flax : a cross-curricula integrated theme = Harakeke (2003).

== Music ==
Neville has been involved in performing music alongside her comics and education activities. She currently plays guitar and does vocals for The Biscuits, and has played a number of gigs including several at the Audio Foundation. The Biscuits have a similar aesthetic to Neville's comics and they write songs about nobody wanting to go swimming and monsters lurking.

She was also a member of Thee Ideal Gus, which held Yoko Ono and Eddie Murphy in equal high regard.
