= Nexus (student magazine) =

Students' magazine at the University of Waikato

Nexus Magazine
- Editor: Toby Brocklebanl (Editor in Chief), Dylan Jarrett (Platforms Editor), Aoife McGall (Magazine Editor), Ruby Tocker (Digital Editor)
- Staff writers: Sarah Smith, Joseph Laybourn, Riley Hunt, Alifah Nur, Amira Stephenson, Lauren Anastasi
- Frequency: Weekly
- Circulation: 2000
- Founded: 1967
- Company: Nexus Magazine
- Country: New Zealand
- Based in: Hamilton
- Language: English
- Website: www.nexusmag.co.nz

Nexus is the weekly free students' magazine of the Waikato Students' Union at the University of Waikato, New Zealand.

== History and profile ==
Nexus was established in 1967 and now has an advertised circulation of 2000 weekly. It is published throughout the academic year in the form of a full colour magazine and is also made available on the Waikato Students Union website.

In the late 1990s the magazine faced troubled times, caused mainly by the student union membership being made voluntary.

== Controversy ==
In 1967, the editor, co-editor, and printer of Nexus were sued after printing allegations against a professor at the University of Waikato. In court, the case was described as "the worst defamation [case] in New Zealand history" at the time. The editor and co-editor withdrew and expressed regret for these statements, and action was discontinued against both. The printer of Nexus - Wanganui Newspapers Ltd - lost the case, and the defendant was awarded $30,000.

In 2003, an advertisement in the magazine, titled "Nexus, Funnier than Porn", drew several complaints.
