= Susan Hassall =

New Zealand school principal and university chancellor

Dame Susan Hassall DNZM JP
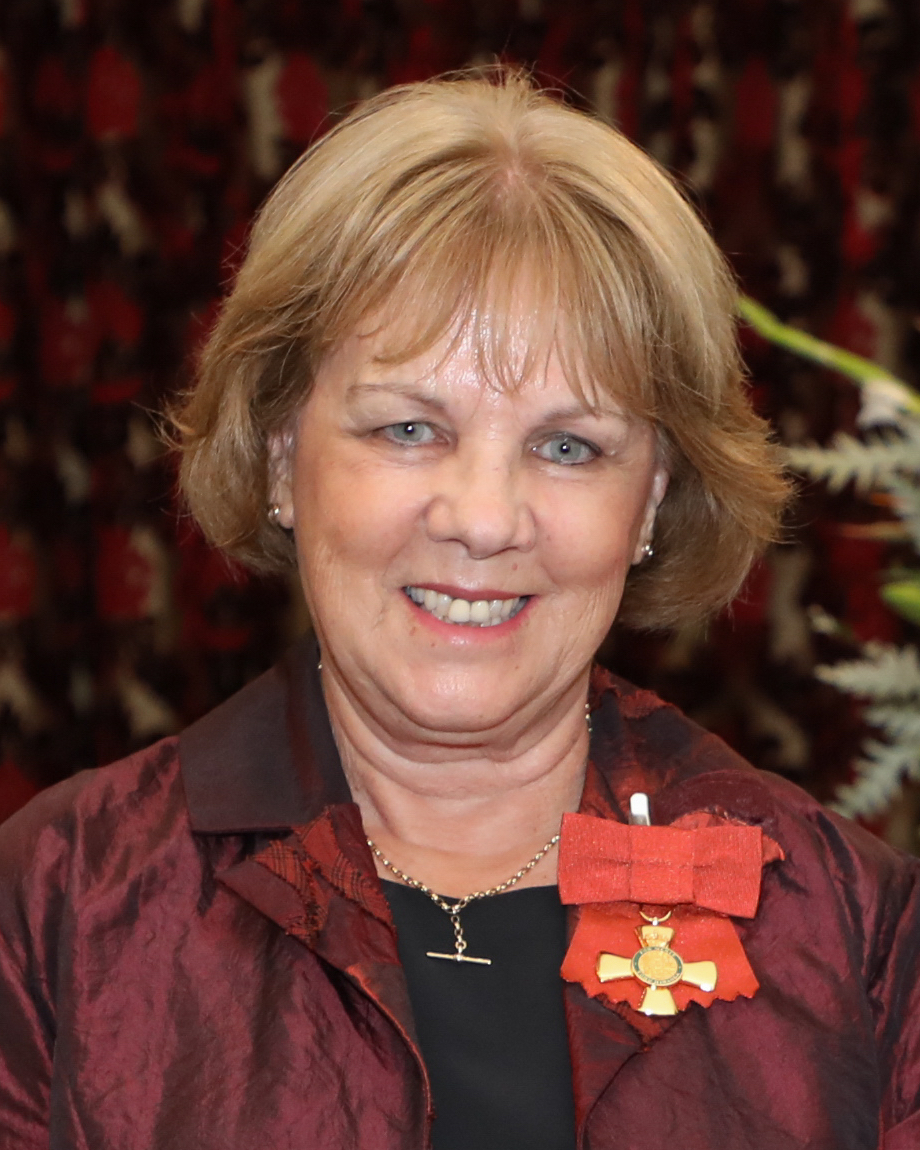
- Hassall in 2022

13th Chancellor of the University of Waikato
- Incumbent
- Assumed office 2025
- Preceded by: Anand Satyanand

7th Headmaster of Hamilton Boys' High School
- In office 1999–2024
- Preceded by: James Bennett
- Succeeded by: Jarred Williams

Personal details
- Born: Susan Jean Ross; 1954 or 1955
- Spouse: James Hassall (m. 1985; died 2023)
- Education: University of Auckland

Dame Susan Jean Hassall DNZM JP (née Ross; born 1954 or 1955) is a New Zealand educator and university governor. She served as headmaster of Hamilton Boys' High School from 1999 to 2024 and was the first woman appointed to lead a boys' state secondary school in New Zealand. Since 2025, she has served as chancellor of the University of Waikato.

== Early life and education ==
Hassall was born in 1954 or 1955. She was educated at Manurewa High School in South Auckland, and studied at the University of Auckland, graduating with a Master of Arts (Honours) degree. During her teacher training she completed section training at Cambridge High School.

== Teaching career ==
Hassall spent all of her teaching career at Hamilton Boys' High School, initially joining the school under her maiden name, Susan Ross, as an English teacher. In 1985, she married James Hassall, also an English teacher at the school, and the couple went on to have three children.

In 1999, Hassall was appointed headmaster of Hamilton Boys' High, becoming the first woman to lead a boys' state secondary school in New Zealand. During her tenure, the school increased its reputation for academic and sporting achievement and its roll increased from 1250 students in 1990 to 2300 in 2020.

Hassall was a founding member of the Association of Boys' Schools of New Zealand in 2001 and subsequently held several executive offices within the organisation. She also contributed to gifted education through giftEDnz and service on the ministerial advisory group.

After serving as headmaster for 25 years, Hassall retired from Hamilton Boys' High School in 2024. Her husband had died the previous year, having retired from full-time teaching in 2016.

== University governance ==
Hassall was first appointed to the University of Waikato Council in March 2016. She served as pro-chancellor from 2017 until 2025. In 2025, she succeeded Anand Satyanand as chancellor of the university. During her period in university governance, she has contributed to the development of a kawenata (covenant) between Waikato Tainui and the University of Waikato, signed in 2025 to support shared strategic objectives and programmes.

== Community service ==
Hassall has been involved in a number of community organisations in the Waikato region. She served on the board of Hospice Waikato from 2018 and later became chair of the trust. Between 2024 and 2025, she served as acting chief executive of the organisation for ten months.

In 2025, Hassall joined the board of Momentum Waikato and became deputy chair the following year. She has also served as a justice of the peace since 2001, and is a wedding and special occasion celebrant.

== Honours and awards ==
Hassall (left), after her investiture as a Dame Companion of the New Zealand Order of Merit by the governor-general, Dame Cindy Kiro, at Government House, Wellington, on 18 September 2026

In the 2021 Queen's Birthday Honours, Hassall was appointed an Officer of the New Zealand Order of Merit (ONZM), for services to education. In 2024, she received the Hamilton Kirikiriroa Medal from Hamilton City Council, in recognition of her contribution to education and the Hamilton community.

In the 2026 King's Birthday Honours, Hassall was promoted to Dame Companion of the New Zealand Order of Merit (DNZM), for services to education.
