= Waikato Students' Union =

Student Association at the University of Waikato

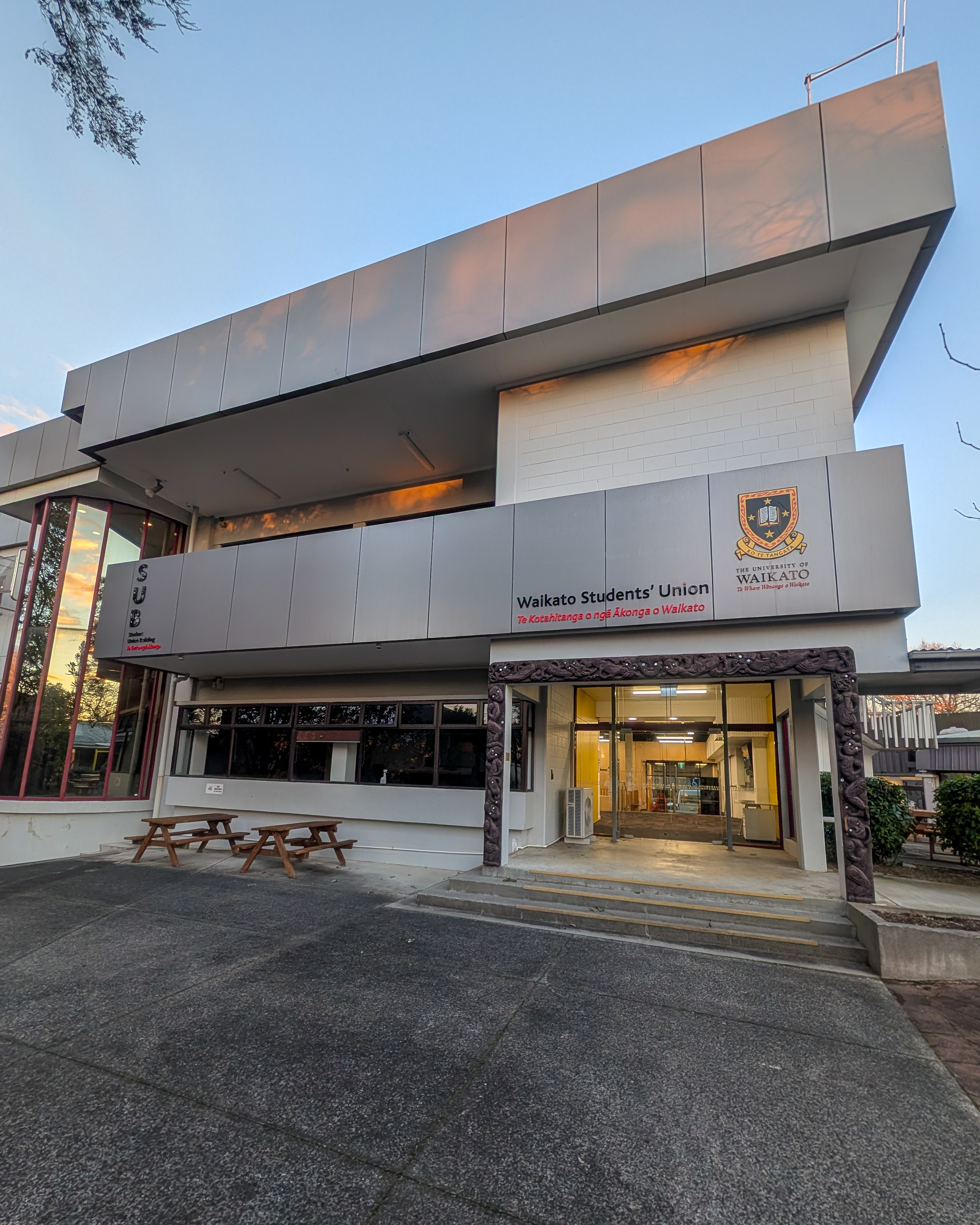
- Institution: The University of Waikato
- Location: Hamilton, New Zealand; Tauranga, New Zealand
- Established: mid-1970s
- President: Seamus Lohrey
- Affiliations: Aotearoa Tertiary Students Association (ATSA)

The Waikato Students' Union, also known as the WSU and Te Awa Kōtui, is the official student association at the University of Waikato, New Zealand. The WSU was established in the mid 1970s, as a result of a merger between an existing Students' Association and the Teaching Student Association. The WSU assist students in several important ways, including student advocacy, student engagement, and student voice. They support and fund 85+ clubs over the university's 2 campuses.

In 1998, the WSU was the first students' union in New Zealand to adopt a voluntary membership scheme. In 2000, students voted to reinstate compulsory membership.

In 2026, the WSU adopted a new Māori name, Te Awa Kōtui.

The WSU funds the student magazine Nexus.

== Organisation ==
The Waikato Students' Union is a representative body for students enrolled at the University of Waikato.

=== WSU Board ===
The WSU Board consists of six positions, who serve as a governance body.

This is the WSU Board for 2026.

| Executive Position | 2026 Officeholder |
|---|---|
| President | Seamus Lohrey |
| Vice-President Māori | Te Paea Parengaio Maurirere |
| Executive Director Pacific | Melerita McGaughey |
| Executive Director Tauranga | Olivia Boyd |
| Executive Director Experience | Luke East |
| Executive Director Academic | Amira Stephenson |

=== Management and Administration ===
The day-to-day operation of the WSU is handled by a team of staff. These include the below staff members.

| Position Name | Officeholder |
|---|---|
| General Manager | David West |
| Communications and Engagement Manager | James Raftan |
| Accounts | Bobby Joseph |

=== Engagement ===
The Engagement team run student experiences, manage clubs and Rōpū Māori events, give out club grants, and assist with equipment. This team also includes staff members of Nexus Media, who create and distribute the Nexus magazine.

=== Support ===
The Support team assist students in areas of student life, including assisting with advocating for students where there are issues with education, and assisting in financial matters.

=== Student Voice ===
The Waikato Students' Union is known to take positions on actions of the University of Waikato, both for and against, including protesting when the University cancelled marae graduations in 2023, and supporting increased resourcing of sexual violence awareness in 2019.

== Locations ==
The WSU is headquartered on the University of Waikato's Hamilton campus, in the Student Union Building (SUB). It also has a wing at the university's Tauranga campus, which is based in the Student Hub at that campus.

== Controversy ==
In 2000, the University of Auckland student magazine Craccum published an article criticising the Waikato Students' Union voluntary membership scheme. Matthew Flannagan, who was President of the WSU at the time, had travelled to Auckland to warn the magazine of inaccuracies in their article, but upon learning that 1000 copies of that issue had been distributed he threatened defamatory action against the Auckland University Students' Association (AUSA). Efeso Collins, president of the AUSA at the time, defended the magazine.

In 2019, both Nexus and the WSU came under fire for implying that Nexus would be taking over the operation of an independent music podcast using their buildings.
