= University of Waikato =

Public university in Hamilton, New Zealand

Coordinates: 37°47′13″S 175°18′50″E

- Te Whare Wānanga o Waikato (Māori)
- Coat of Arms of the University of Waikato
- Motto: Māori: Ko te tangata
- Motto in English: For The People
- Type: Public research university
- Established: 1964; 62 years ago
- Affiliations: ACU, ASAIHL, AACSB, AMBA, EQUIS
- Endowment: NZ$13.6 million (31 December 2021)
- Budget: NZD $263.6 million (31 December 2020)
- Chancellor: Susan Hassall
- Vice-Chancellor: Neil Quigley
- Administrative staff: 1,499 (FTS, 2020)
- Students: 10,537 (EFTS, 2021)
- Location: Hamilton, Waikato, New Zealand
- Campus: Suburban 65 ha (160 acres)
- Student Magazine: Nexus
- Colours: UW Red, Gold and Black
- Website: www.waikato.ac.nz

The University of Waikato (Māori: Te Whare Wānanga o Waikato), established in 1964, is a public research university located in Hamilton, New Zealand. An additional campus is located in Tauranga. The university performs research in numerous disciplines such as education, social sciences, and management and is an innovator in environmental science, marine and freshwater ecology, engineering, computer science and artificial intelligence. It offers degrees in health, engineering, computer science, management, Māori and Indigenous Studies, the arts, psychology, social sciences and education.

== History ==
In the mid-1950s, regional and national leaders recognised the need for a new university and urged the then University of New Zealand (UNZ) and the government to establish one in Hamilton. Their campaign coincided with a shortage of school teachers, and after years of lobbying, Minister of Education Philip Skoglund agreed to open a teachers' college in the region. In 1960, the newly established Hamilton Teachers' College, joined by a fledgling university (initially a branch of the University of Auckland), opened a joint campus at Ruakura

In 1964, the two institutions moved to their new home, and the following year the University of Waikato was officially opened by then Governor-General Sir Bernard Fergusson.

At that time, the university comprised a School of Humanities and a School of Social Sciences. In 1969 a School of Science was established. This was followed by the creation of the Waikato Management School in 1972, Computer Science and Computing Services in 1973, and the School of Law in 1990.

In 1990 the Hamilton Teacher's college merged with the University of Waikato. Since 1993, the University has been developing Weka, one of the first open-source AI and machine-learning workbench used in research and teaching.

From the beginning, it was envisaged that Māori studies should be a key feature of the new university, and the Centre for Māori Studies and Research was established in the School of Social Sciences in 1972. A separate School of Māori and Pacific Development was formally established in 1996 and in 2016, became Te Pua Wānanga ki te Ao, Faculty of Māori and Indigenous Studies. In 1999, the original Schools of Humanities and Social Sciences were merged to form the School of Arts and Social Sciences.

In 2018 the university was reorganised under a divisional structure which resulted in its Schools and Faculties being brought under four Divisions and a School; Division of Arts, Law, Psychology and Social Sciences, Division of Education, Division of Health, Engineering and Computer Sciences, Waikato Management School and the Faculty of Māori and Indigenous Studies. Although the university has had a presence in Tauranga since the 1990s, it officially opened its dedicated Tauranga campus in 2019 located in Tauranga's CBD. This added to the university's presence in the Bay of Plenty with the Adams Centre for High Performance in Mount Maunganui and the Coastal Marine Field Station in Sulphur Point on the Tauranga Harbour. In November 2020, the university also opened a new algal research and aquaculture facility in Sulphur Point.

In July 2023, the Pā was opened in the heart of the University, following years of preparation and construction. The structure's name, the Pā, refers to a fortified Māori village/settlement, occurring mainly north of New Zealand's Lake Taupō. Key components of this structure include the Marae, inside which is a Wharenui (meeting house), and the Student Hub, which includes study and meeting spaces, food and beverage retail stores, a social space, and a multi-purpose stage.

=== Proposed medical school ===
In October 2016, Waikato University and the Waikato District Health Board made a joint bid to the New Zealand Government to establish a third medical school in Hamilton. While the bid was opposed by the University of Auckland and the University of Otago (which host New Zealand's two medical schools), it was supported by Hamilton East Member of Parliament (MP) David Bennett of the National Party. On 10 April 2017, several local and regional territorial councils voiced support for the proposed Waikato medical school at a meeting of the Waikato Mayoral Forum in Hamilton. In November 2017, the Waikato District Health Board reiterated its support for the third medical school and outlined its proposal. The Waikato proposal envisioned a four-year graduate entry program focusing on clinical training and supporting local clinical services.

In late June 2018, Waikato District Health Board interim chief executive Derek Wright confirmed there was no update on the third medical school apart from an indication that the Government would not make a decision on the proposal until 2019. Wright stated that district health board would continue lobbying for the Waikato medical school proposal. In 2019, the Labour-led coalition government rejected the idea of establishing a third medical school and instead supported Health Minister David Clark's proposal for multi-disciplinary training hubs in rural areas. In November 2019, the National Party released a discussion document on education supporting the Waikato proposal during the lead-up to the 2020 New Zealand general election. National's proposal was supported by Waikato University Vice Chancellor Neil Quigley, the Waikato District Health Board, and the New Zealand General Practice Network.

In May 2021, the university School of Health's leadership Dean Sarah Strasser and rural health Professor Roger Strasser revived the medical school proposal and proposed partnering with Māori, Pasifika and the rural community to improve local access to health services. This announcement came in light of the Labour Government's plans to reform the 20 district health boards into a Te Whatu Ora (Health New Zealand) and Te Aka Whai Ora (Māori Health Authority). The Health Minister Andrew Little did not rule out the Waikato medical school proposal during a rural health conference in Taupō but stated that work was needed. The National Party's health spokesperson Shane Reti supported the revived Waikato proposal, stating it was an opportunity to train rural doctors and partner with Māori communities.

In early July 2023, the National Party made campaign pledge to build the Waikato medical school during the leadup to the 2023 New Zealand general election. In September 2023, Radio New Zealand (RNZ) reported that Vice-Chancellor Quigley had worked with several National Party figures including health spokesperson Reti, former National cabinet minister Steven Joyce and his lobbying firm Joyce Advisory to develop National's Waikato medical school policy. Waikato University then hired Joyce's former press secretary and political advisor Anna Lillis to promote the school. In response, Tertiary Education Union's Waikato University organiser Shane Vugler criticised the university leadership for compromising its political independence. According RNZ, Quigley had told a senior National MP that the Waikato Medical School could be a "gift" for a future National government. In June 2023, RNZ had also reported that Waikato University had paid nearly NZ$1 million in consultancy fees to Joyce Advisory. In response to media coverage, Luxon defended Waikato University's process for establishing a third medical school, and emphasised that National and Waikato had supported the proposal for several years.

On 21 July 2025, Health Minister Simeon Brown announced that the Sixth National Government would be contributing NZ$82.5 million to the establishment of Waikato's medical school. Waikato University would be contributing $150 million to the medical school's establishment with the help of philanthropists. This fell short of National's 2023 campaign promise to invest $280 million in the establishment of the medical school.

== Campuses ==
The University of Waikato operates from two campuses, Hamilton, and Tauranga. Undergraduate degrees are also offered through a joint-institute on a satellite campus at Zhejiang University City College in Hangzhou.

=== Hamilton ===
The main Hamilton campus is spread over 64 hectares of landscaped gardens and lakes, and includes extensive sporting and recreational areas. Originally farmland, the campus was designed by architect John Blake-Kelly in 1964. The open space landscaping contains extensive native plantings, including a fernery, centred around three lakes.

=== Tauranga ===
The University of Waikato previously shared campuses with Toi Ohomai Institute of Technology in Tauranga at Windmere in the central city. In March 2019, the university opened a stand-alone campus in the central city.

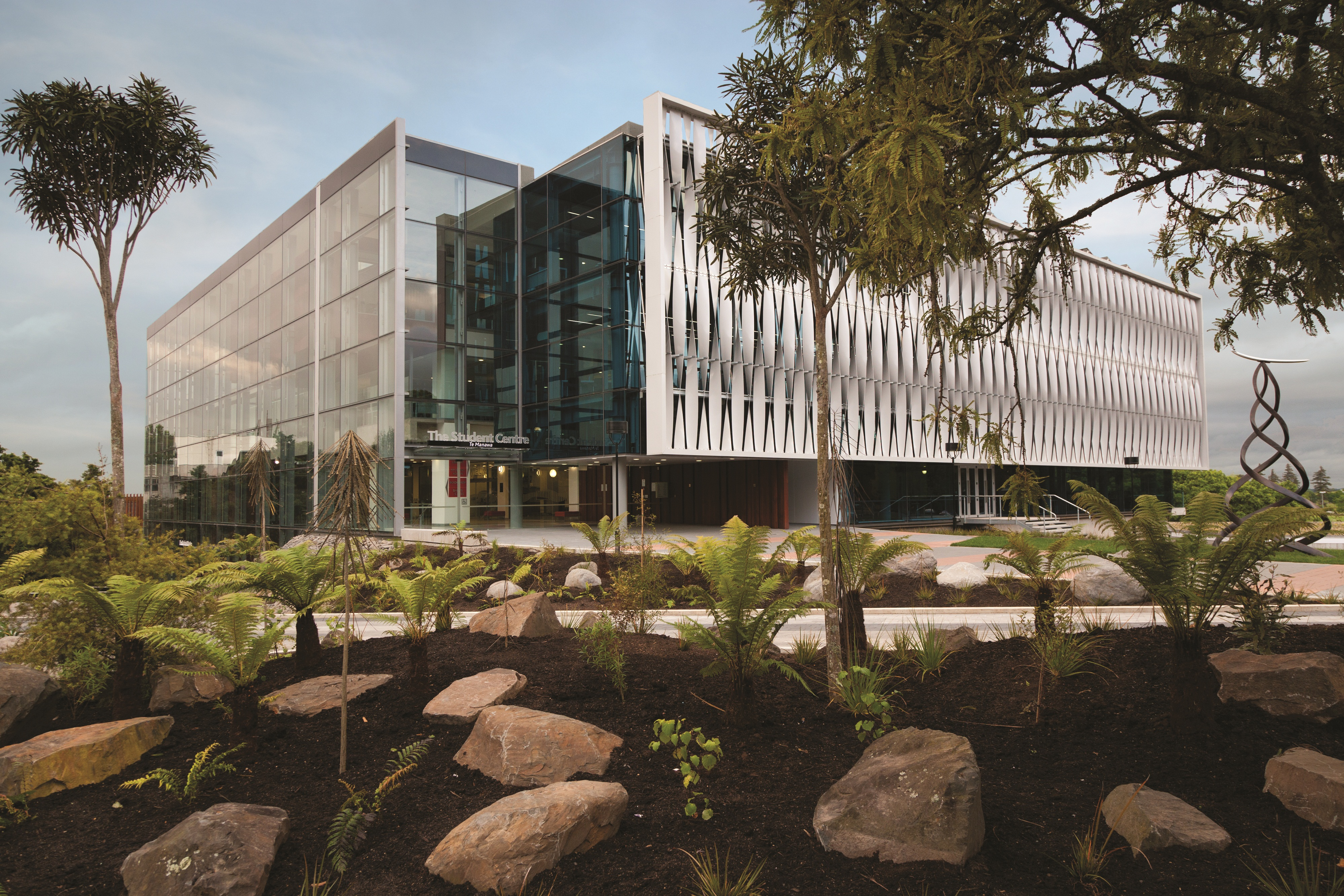
Waikato University Student Centre.

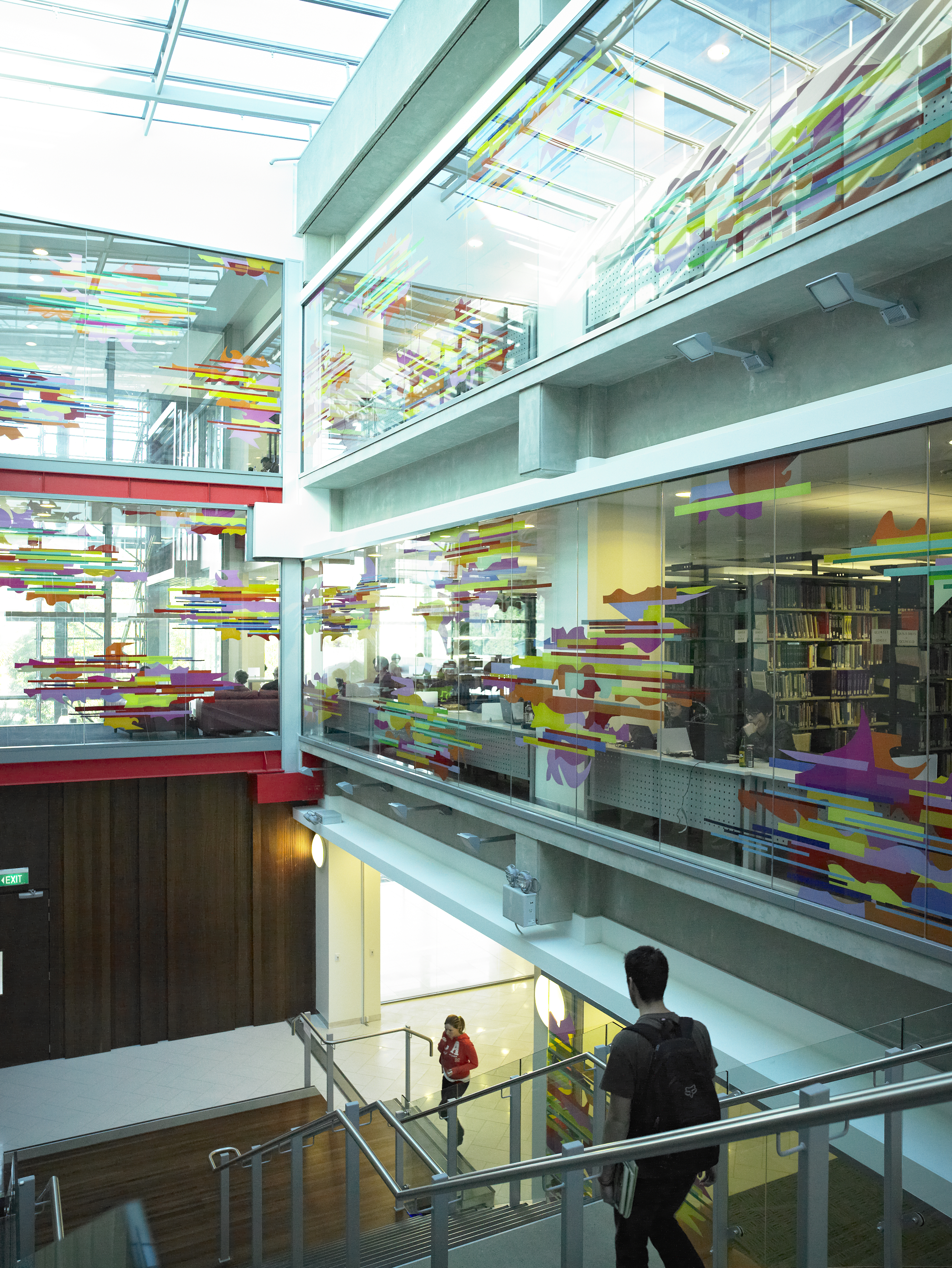
Inside the Waikato University Student Centre.

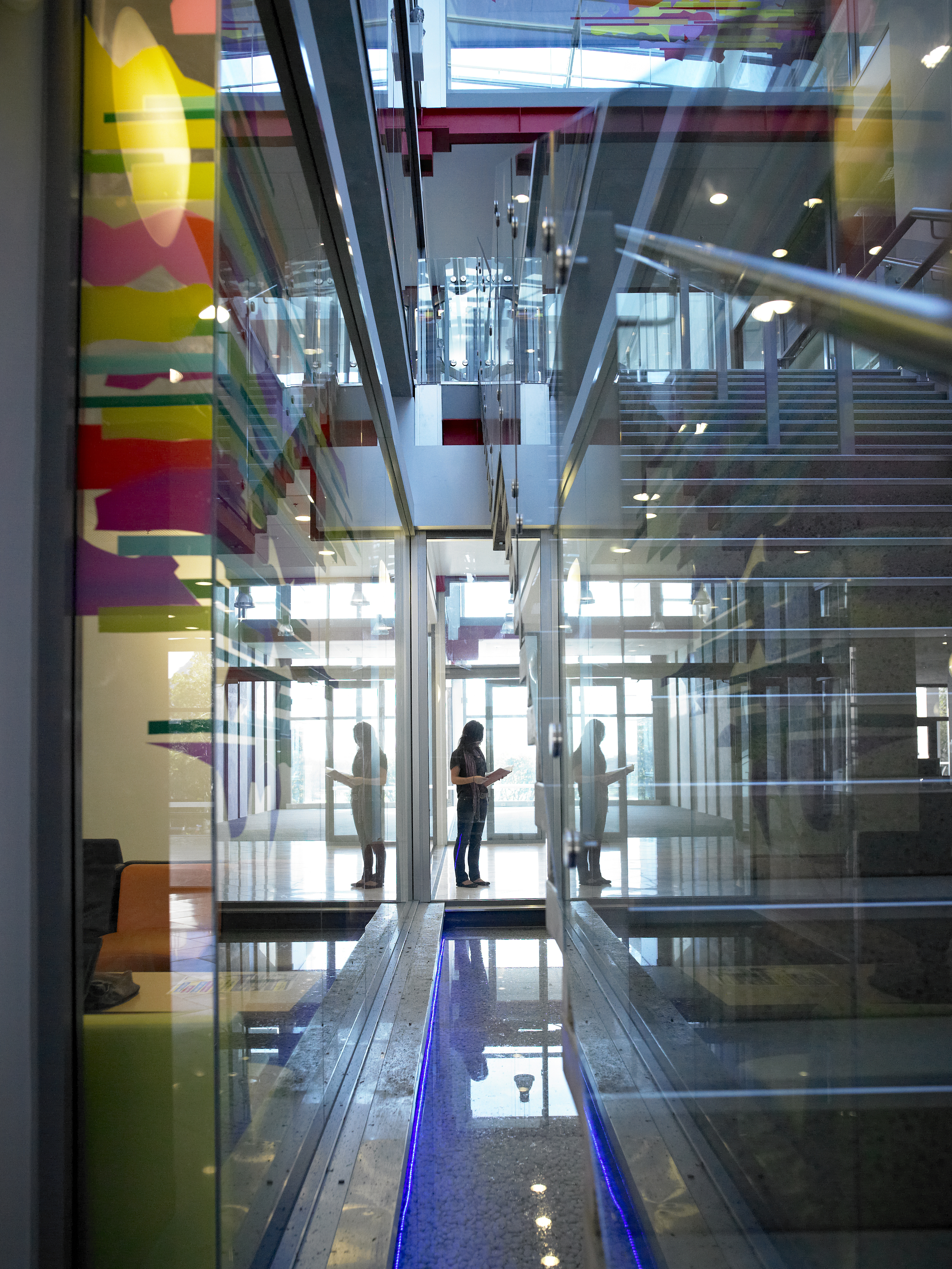
Water feature inside the Waikato University Student Centre.

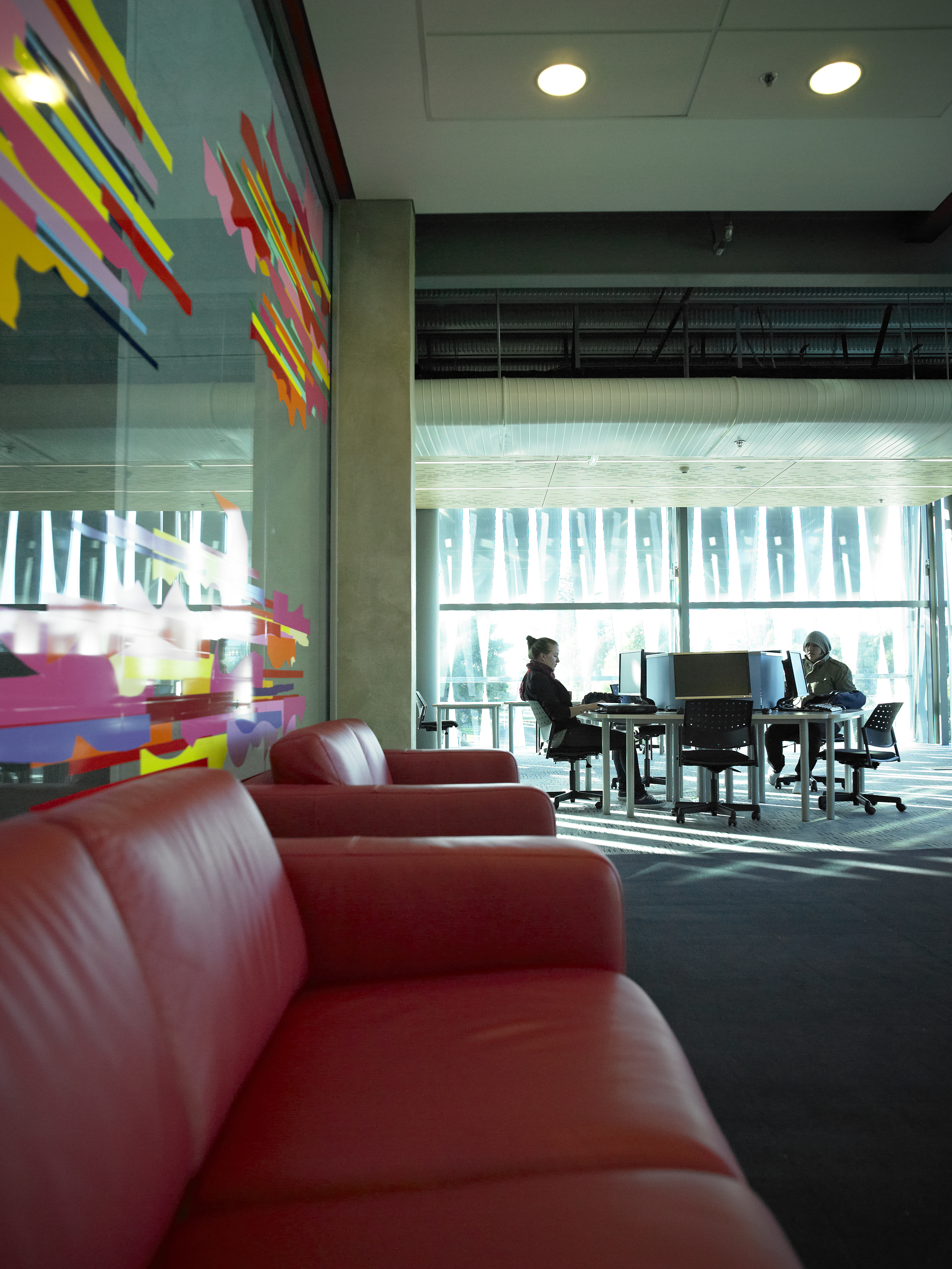
Computer lab inside the Waikato University Student Centre.

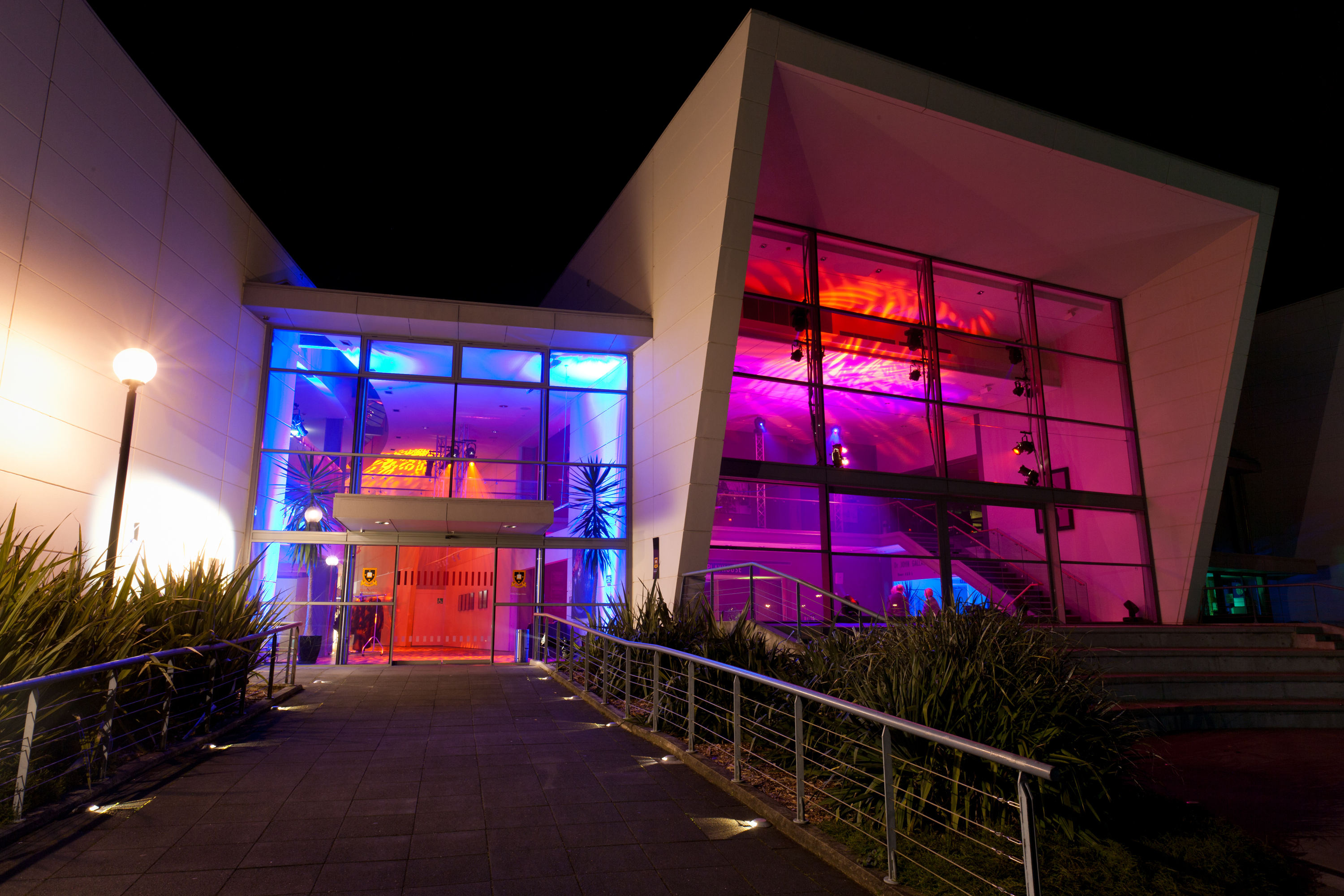
The Gallagher Academy of Performing Arts.

The Student Centre officially opened in 2011 by Waikato alumnus Governor-General Jerry Mateparae.

== Administration and organisation ==
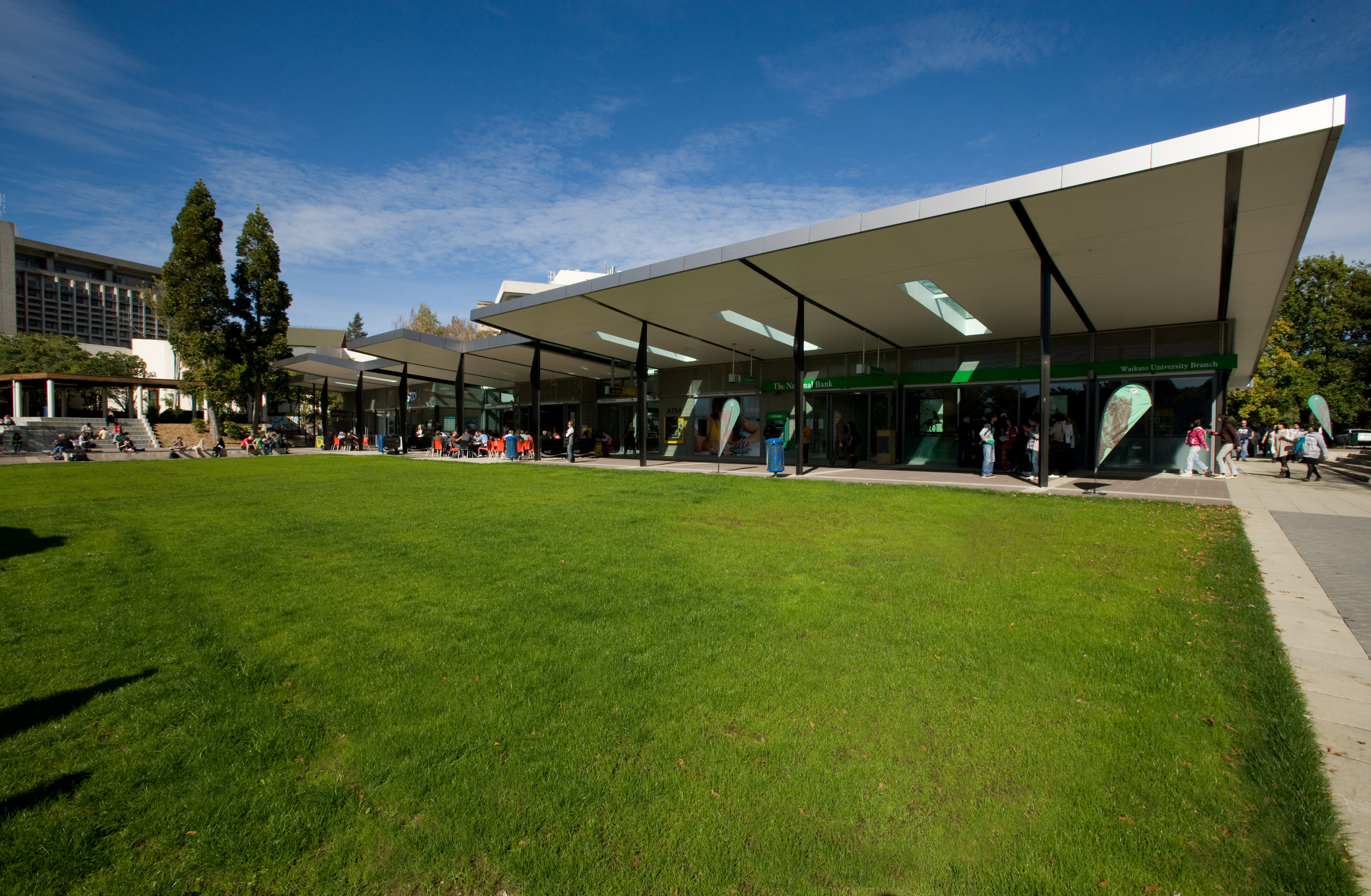
The village green is the social hub of the University of Waikato's Hamilton campus

The university is organised around faculties and schools, grouped in divisions; as of 2024:

=== Te Wānanga o Ngā Kete Division of Arts, Law, Psychology and Social Sciences ===
- Te Kura Toi School of Arts
- School of Law, Politics and Philosophy
- Te Kura Whatu Oho Mauri – School of Psychological and Social Sciences

=== Division of STEM ===
- Te Kura Mata-Ao School of Engineering
- Au Reikura School of Computing and Mathematical Sciences
- Te Aka Mātuatua School of Science
- Te Ipu o Te Mahara – Artificial Intelligence Institute
- Te Tumu Whakaora Taiao – The Environmental Research Institute (ERI)

=== Division of Education ===
- Te Kura Toi Tangata School of Education

=== Division of Management ===
- Te Raupapa Waikato Management School

=== Not part of a division ===
- Te Mata Kairangi School of Graduate Research
- Te Pua Wānanga ki te Ao Māori and Indigenous Studies
- University of Waikato College: The college primarily supports international students and pre-masters studies and diplomas.

=== Executive leadership ===
The chief executive of the University of Waikato is the vice-chancellor, currently Professor Neil Quigley, who was appointed to a five-year term in 2014 and another in 2019. Previous vice-chancellors of the university are:

	Name	Portrait	Term
1	Don Llewellyn		1964–1984
2	Wilf Malcolm		1985–1994
3	Bryan Gould		1994–2004
4	Roy Crawford		2005–2014
5	Neil Quigley		2015–present

The university is governed by a council, headed by the university's chancellor, who is currently Dame Susan Hassall. Te Rōpū Manukura was formed in 1991 as a consultative body to the university council. Te Rōpū Manukura is currently made up of members from over 20 different iwi within the catchment area of the university.

The following list shows the university's chancellors:

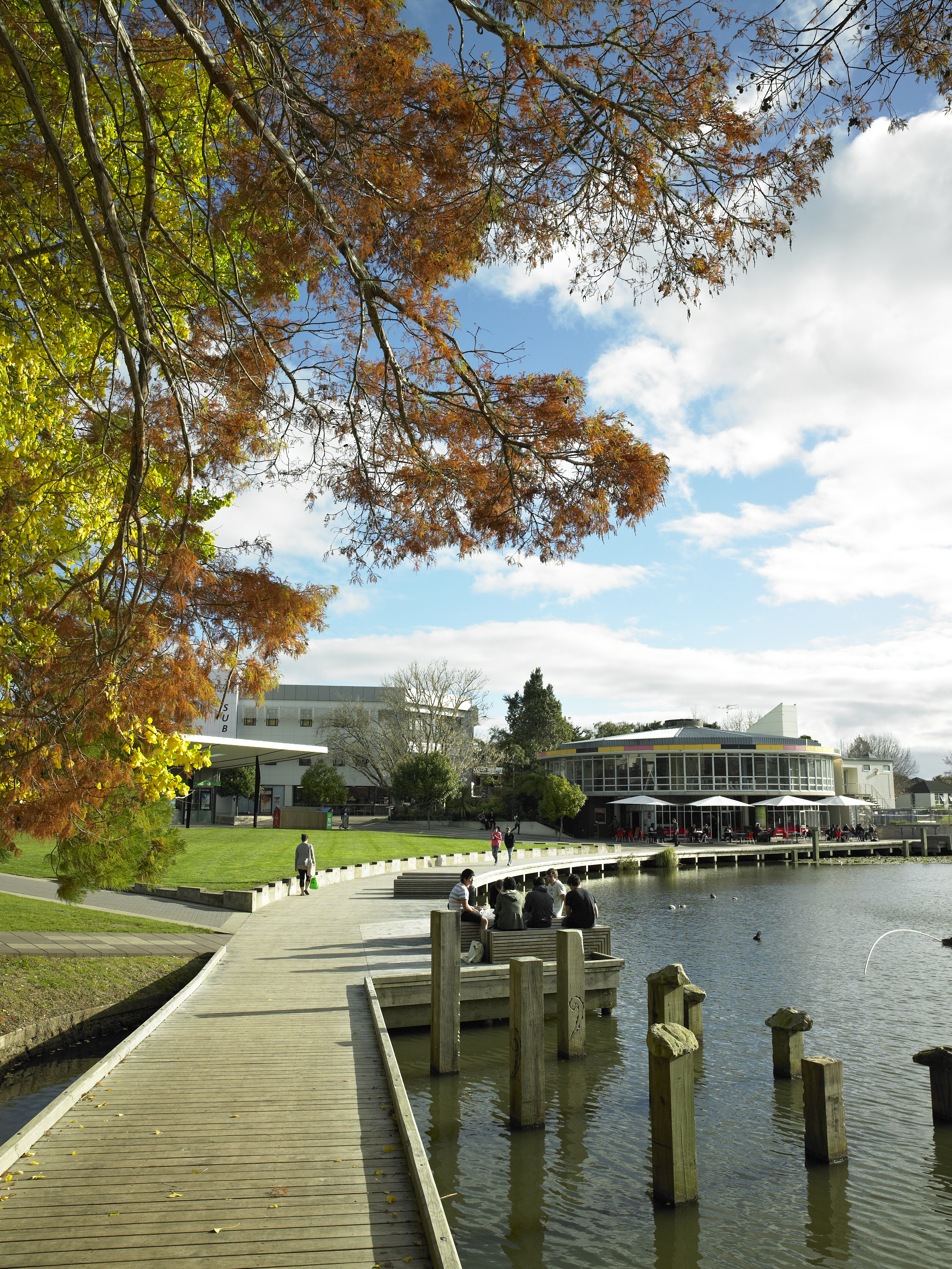
One of three lakes on the University of Waikato's Hamilton campus

	Name	Portrait	Term
1	Denis Rogers		1964–1969
2	Bruce McKenzie		1970–1972
3	Henry Bennett		1973–1978
4	Douglas Arcus		1979–1980
5	David Tompkins		1981–1985
(3)	Henry Bennett		1986–1987
6	Joy Drayton		1988–1991
7	Gerald Bailey		1992–1997
8	Caroline Bennett		1998–2002
9	John Gallagher		2003–2005
10	John Jackman		2006–2007
11	Jim Bolger		2007–2019
12	Anand Satyanand		2019–2025
13	Susan Hassall		2025–present

=== Research institutes and centres ===
The university has several research institutes and research centres, as well as numerous other research groups and projects; as of 2024:

Research institutes

- Te Ipu o Te Mahara – Artificial Intelligence Institute
- Te Mata Punenga o Te Kotahi – Te Kotahi Research Institute (TKRI)
- Te Ngira – Institute for Population Research
- Te Puna Haumaru – New Zealand Institute for Security and Crime Science
- Te Tumu Whakaora Taiao – The Environmental Research Institute (ERI)
- The New Zealand Institute for Business Research – Te Pūtahi Rangahau O Umanga o Aotearoa (NZIBR)

Research centres

- Ahuora Centre for Smart Energy Systems
- Centre for Environmental Biomonitoring Solutions
- Centre for Environmental, Resources and Energy Law: Te Pūtahi o te Ture Taiāo (CEREL)
- Centre for Global Studies in Education: Te Pūtahi Mātauranga ki te Ao (CGSE)
- Coastal Marine Field Station
- Early Years Research Centre: He Kōhanga Toi Tangata
- Medical Research Centre
- Radiocarbon Dating
- Technology, Environmental, Mathematics and Science Education Research Centre: He Rangahau Toi Tangata
- The Māori and Indigenous Governance Centre: Te Mata Hautū Taketake (MIGC)
- Waikato Centre for Advanced Materials and Manufacturing (WaiCAMM)

== Academic profile ==
=== Academic reputation ===
University rankings

Global – Overall
- ARWU World: 701–800 (2025)
- CWTS World: 1100 (Note: The CWTS Leiden Ranking is based on P (top 10%).) (2024)
- QS World: =281 (2026)
- THE World: 401–500 (2026)
- USNWR Global: =722 (25/26)

National – Overall
- ARWU National: 5 (2025)
- CWTS National: 6 (2024)
- QS National: 6 (2026)
- THE National: 3–4 (2026)
- USNWR National: 7 (25/26)

In the 2024 Aggregate Ranking of Top Universities, which measures aggregate performance across the QS, THE and ARWU rankings, the university attained a position of #391 (5th nationally).

In the 2026 Quacquarelli Symonds World University Rankings (published 2025), the university attained a tied position of #281 (6th nationally).

In the Times Higher Education World University Rankings 2026 (published 2025), the university attained a position of #401–500 (tied 3–4th nationally).

In the 2025 Academic Ranking of World Universities, the university attained a position of #701–800 (5th nationally).

In the 2025–2026 U.S. News & World Report Best Global Universities, the university attained a tied position of #722 (7th nationally).

In the CWTS Leiden Ranking 2024, the university attained a position of #1100 (6th nationally).

== Notable people ==
=== Notable alumni ===
Nga wai hono i te po, 8th Māori monarch

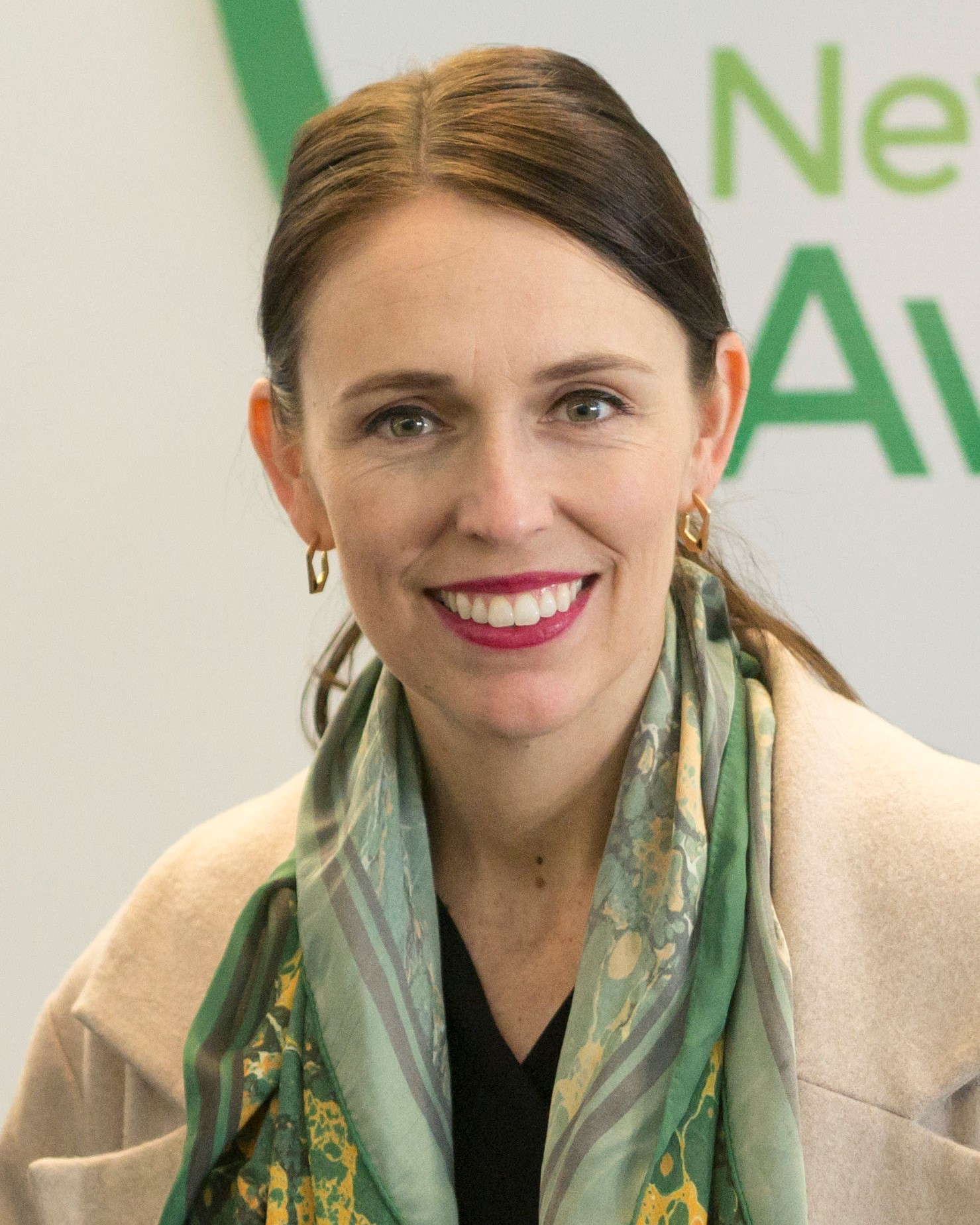
Jacinda Ardern, 40th Prime Minister of New Zealand

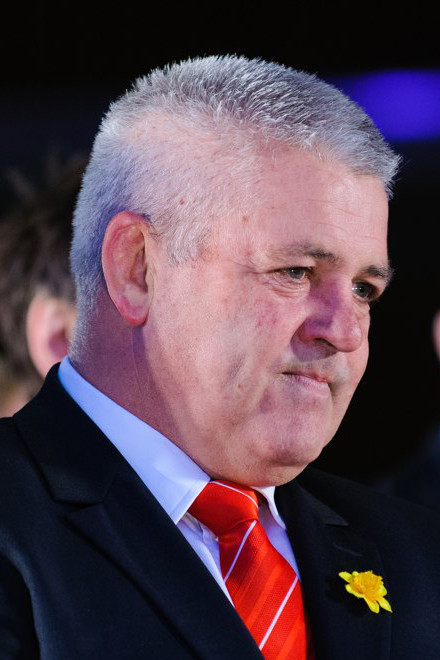
Warren Gatland, international rugby union player and coach

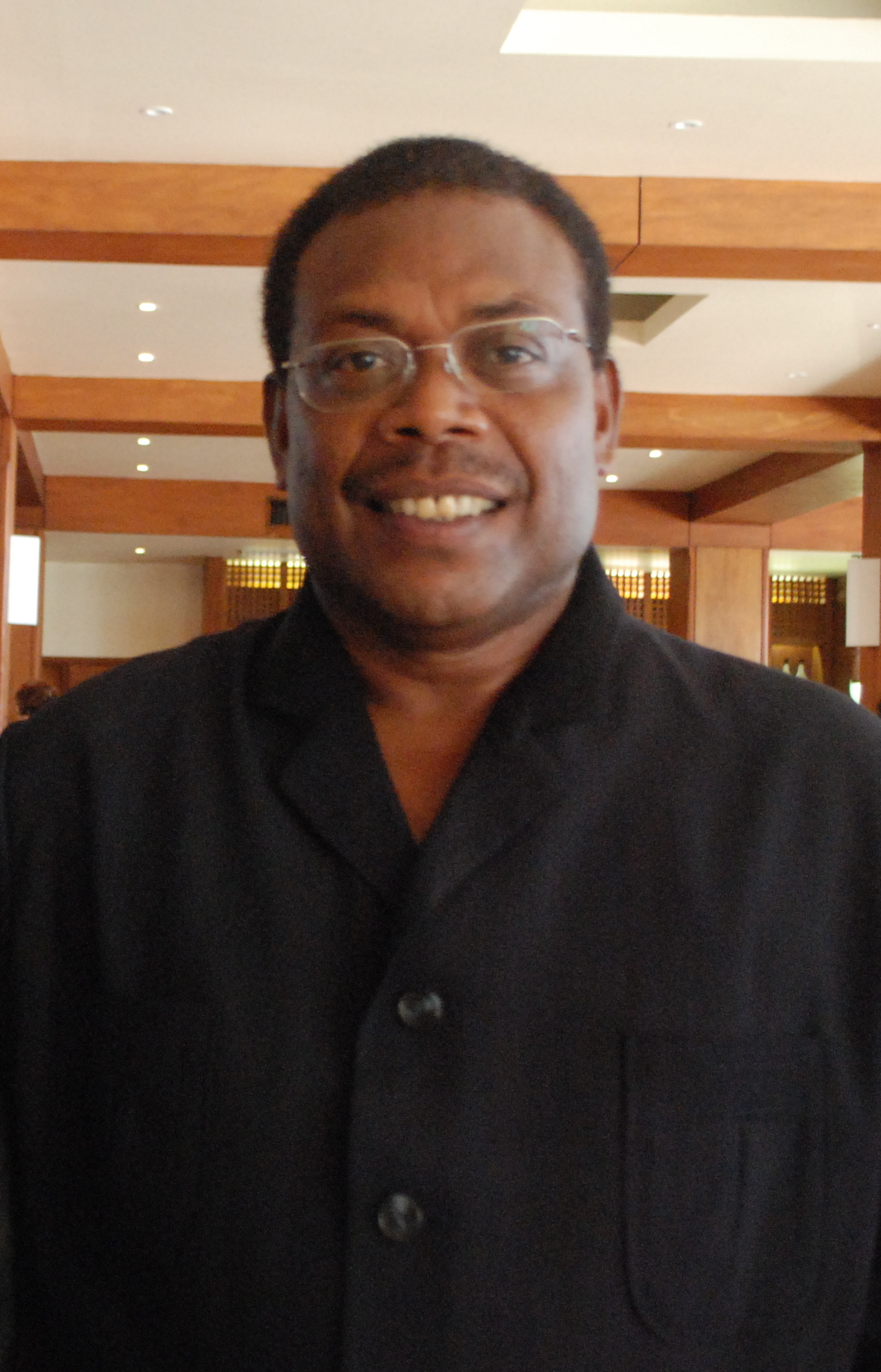
Derek Sikua, 9th Prime Minister of the Solomon Islands

Waikato Management School

- Dame Jacinda Ardern GNZM, 40th Prime Minister of New Zealand
- Ned Kock, professor of Information Systems, Texas A&M International University
- Mark Wilson, former CEO of AXA, AIA (Asia) and CEO of Aviva (UK), entrepreneur
- Jan Zijderveld, former CEO of Avon, Unilever President (Europe)
- Vittoria Shortt, CEO of ASB Bank
- Kevin Bowler, CEO of My Food Bag

Division of Arts, Law and Social Sciences

- Judge Craig Coxhead, Māori Land Court Judge and Chief Justice of Niue
- Tania Te Rangingangana Simpson, Deputy Chair and Director Reserve Bank of New Zealand
- The Honourable Dame Annette King, Former Member of Parliament
- Wayne Smith, CNZM previous All Blacks player and 2011 All Blacks coach

Division of STEM

- Shane Legg, Co-founder and Chief Scientist Google DeepMind
- Craig Nevill-Manning, Founder and Director of Google's first remote engineering centre, key developer of Google Maps and Froogle
- Andrew Smith, CEO Profile Foods
- Professor Tom Higham, Professor of Archaeological Science, Deputy Director of the Oxford Radiocarbon Accelerator Unit
- Ian Graham, former Dean, founder of Endace, and New Zealand's Engineering Entrepreneur of 2011.

Division of Education

- Professor Fui Le'api Tu'ua 'Īlaoa Asofou So'o, Vice-Chancellor and President of the National University of Samoa
- Warren Gatland OBE, Head Coach, Chiefs, British and Irish Lions
- Alyn Ware, International Representative of the Peace Foundation, International Coordinator for the Parliamentary Network for Nuclear Disarmament and Consultant for the International Association of Lawyers Against Nuclear Arms
- Honourable Derek Sikua, ninth Prime Minister of the Solomon Islands

Faculty of Maori and Indigenous Studies

- Hinewehi Mohi MNZM, Managing Director, Raukatauri Productions Ltd, singer and songwriter, co-founder and trustee of the Raukatauri Music Therapy Centre
- Tania Te Rangingangana Simpson, Deputy Chair and Director Reserve Bank of New Zealand
- Turanga Hoturoa Barclay-Kerr CNZM, master voyager and co-chair of the national coordinating committee for the Tuia 250 – Encounters programme
- Willow-Jean Prime, Member of Parliament

The University of Waikato's official website lists other notable alumni, referred as "Distinguished Alumni" by the university.

=== Notable academic staff and honorary doctorates ===
- Academic staff of the University of Waikato
- List of honorary doctors of the University of Waikato

== See also ==
- Waikato Students' Union
- Nexus, the free on-campus student magazine
