= List of Department of Health and Human Services appointments by Joe Biden =

Political appointments by President Joe Biden

Below is a list of nominations and appointments to the Department of Health and Human Services by Joe Biden, the 46th president of the United States. As of May 10, 2024, according to tracking by The Washington Post and Partnership for Public Service, 15 nominees have been confirmed, 1 nominee is being considered by the Senate, 3 positions do not have nominees, and 22 appointments have been made to positions that do not require Senate confirmation.

== Color key ==
Denotes appointees awaiting Senate confirmation.

Denotes appointees serving in an acting capacity.

Denotes appointees who have left office or offices which have been disbanded.

== Leadership ==
Office	Nominee	Assumed office	Left office
— Secretary of Health and Human Services	Xavier Becerra	March 19, 2021 (Confirmed March 18, 2021, 50–49)	—
— Deputy Secretary of Health and Human Services	Andrea Palm	May 12, 2021 (Confirmed May 11, 2021, 61–37)	—

== Office of the Secretary ==
Office	Nominee	Assumed office	Left office
— Assistant Secretary of Health and Human Services (Administration)	Cheryl Campbell	June 8, 2021	—
— Assistant Secretary of Health and Human Services (Financial Resources)	Robert Gordon	October 11, 2022 (Confirmed September 29, 2022 by voice vote)	October 2023
— Assistant Secretary of Health and Human Services (Global Affairs)	Loyce Pace	March 1, 2021	—
— Assistant Secretary of Health and Human Services (Health)	Dr. Rachel Levine	March 26, 2021 (Confirmed March 24, 2021, 52–48) October 19, 2021 (as admiral, PHSCC)	—
— Surgeon General	Dr. Vivek Murthy	March 25, 2021 (Confirmed March 23, 2021, 57–43)	—
— Director of the Agency for Healthcare Research and Quality	Robert Otto Valdez	February 27, 2022	—
— Assistant Secretary of Health and Human Services (Legislation)	Melanie Egorin	October 7, 2021 (Confirmed September 30, 2021 by voice vote)	—
— Assistant Secretary of Health and Human Services (Preparedness and Response)	Dawn O'Connell	June 28, 2021 (Confirmed June 24, 2021 by voice vote)	—
— Assistant Secretary of Health and Human Services (Public Affairs)	Jeff Nesbit	August 21, 2023	—
— Assistant Secretary of Health and Human Services (Public Affairs)	Sarah Lovenheim	March 22, 2021	December 30, 2022
— General Counsel of Health and Human Services	Sam Bagenstos	June 15, 2022 (Confirmed June 9, 2022, 49–43)	—
— Inspector General of the Department of Health and Human Services	Christi Grimm	February 22, 2022 (Confirmed February 17, 2022 by voice vote)	—

== Operating Divisions ==
Office	Nominee	Assumed office	Left office
Administration for Children and Families
— Assistant Secretary of Health and Human Services (Children & Families)	January Contreras	March 31, 2022 (Confirmed March 30, 2022, 54–44)	August 12, 2023
— Commissioner of the Administration for Children, Youth and Families	Rebecca Jones Gaston	January 11, 2023 (Confirmed December 22, 2022 by voice vote)	—
— Commissioner of the Administration for Native Americans	Patrice Kunesh	March 8, 2023 (Confirmed March 8, 2023, 57–35)	—
— Director of the Office of Refugee Resettlement	Robin Dunn Marcos	September 2022	—
— Director of the Office of Refugee Resettlement	Cindy Huang	March 2, 2021	April 2022
Centers for Disease Control and Prevention
— Director of the Centers for Disease Control and Prevention	Dr. Mandy Cohen	July 10, 2023	—
— Director of the Centers for Disease Control and Prevention	Dr. Rochelle Walensky	January 20, 2021	June 30, 2023
Centers for Medicare and Medicaid Services
— Administrator of the Centers for Medicare and Medicaid Services	Chiquita Brooks-LaSure	May 27, 2021 (Confirmed May 25, 2021, 55–44)	—
— Deputy Administrator and Director of Medicaid and CHIP Services	Daniel Tsai	July 6, 2021	—
— Deputy Administrator and Director of Center for Medicare	Meena Seshamani	July 6, 2021	—
Food and Drug Administration
— Commissioner of Food and Drugs	Dr. Robert Califf	February 17, 2022 (Confirmed February 15, 2022, 50–46)	—
Health Resources and Services Administration
— Administrator of the Health Resources and Services Administration	Carole Johnson	January 6, 2022	—
Indian Health Service
— Director of the Indian Health Service	Roselyn Tso	September 27, 2022 (Confirmed September 21, 2022 by voice vote)	—
National Institutes of Health
— Director of the National Institutes of Health	Dr. Monica Bertagnolli	November 9, 2023 (Confirmed November 7, 2023, 62–36)	—
— Director of the Advanced Research Projects Agency for Health	Dr. Renee Wegrzyn	October 11, 2022	—
— Director of the National Cancer Institute	Dr. Kimryn Rathmell	December 18, 2023	—
— Director of the National Cancer Institute	Dr. Monica Bertagnolli	October 3, 2022	November 9, 2023
— Chair of the National Cancer Advisory Board	Dr. John Carpten	September 15, 2021	—
— Member of the National Cancer Advisory Board	Dr. Nilofer S. Azad	September 15, 2021	—
— Member of the National Cancer Advisory Board	Dr. Luis Alberto Diaz Jr.	September 15, 2021	—
— Member of the National Cancer Advisory Board	Dr. Christopher R. Friese	September 15, 2021	—
— Member of the National Cancer Advisory Board	Dr. Amy B. Heimberger	September 15, 2021	—
— Member of the National Cancer Advisory Board	Dr. Ashani Weeraratna	September 15, 2021	—
— Member of the National Cancer Advisory Board	Dr. Karen Winkfield	September 15, 2021	—
— Member of the National Cancer Advisory Board	Dr. Callisia Clarke	May 10, 2024	—
— Member of the National Cancer Advisory Board	Karen Emmons	May 10, 2024	—
— Member of the National Cancer Advisory Board	Tamika Felder	May 10, 2024	—
— Member of the National Cancer Advisory Board	Dr. Edjah Nduom	May 10, 2024	—
— Member of the National Cancer Advisory Board	Dr. Kimberly Stegmaier	October 15, 2024	—
Substance Abuse and Mental Health Services Administration (SAMHSA)
— Assistant Secretary of Health and Human Services (Mental Health and Substance Use) & Administrator for SAMHSA	Miriam Delphin-Rittmon	July 14, 2021 (Confirmed June 24, 2021 by voice vote)	—

== Withdrawn nominations ==
Office	Nominee	Announced	Withdrawn	Notes
— Assistant Secretary of Health and Human Services (Planning and Evaluation)	Robert Otto Valdez	September 16, 2021	January 7, 2022	
— Assistant Secretary of Health and Human Services (Planning and Evaluation)	Rebecca Haffajee	April 15, 2022	January 3, 2025	
— Assistant Secretary of Health and Human Services (Aging) & Administrator for Community Living	Rita Landgraf	March 9, 2022	January 3, 2023	

== See also ==
- Cabinet of Joe Biden, for the vetting process undergone by top-level roles including advice and consent by the Senate
- List of executive branch 'czars' e.g. Special Advisor to the President

== Notes ==
Confirmation votes

Confirmations by roll call vote

Confirmations by voice vote
