= Heimberger =

Heimberger is a surname. Notable people with the surname include:

- Amy B. Heimberger, American neurosurgeon
- Emil Heimberger (1889–1978), American violinist and bandleader
