= Joanne Chiedi =

American administrator and government official

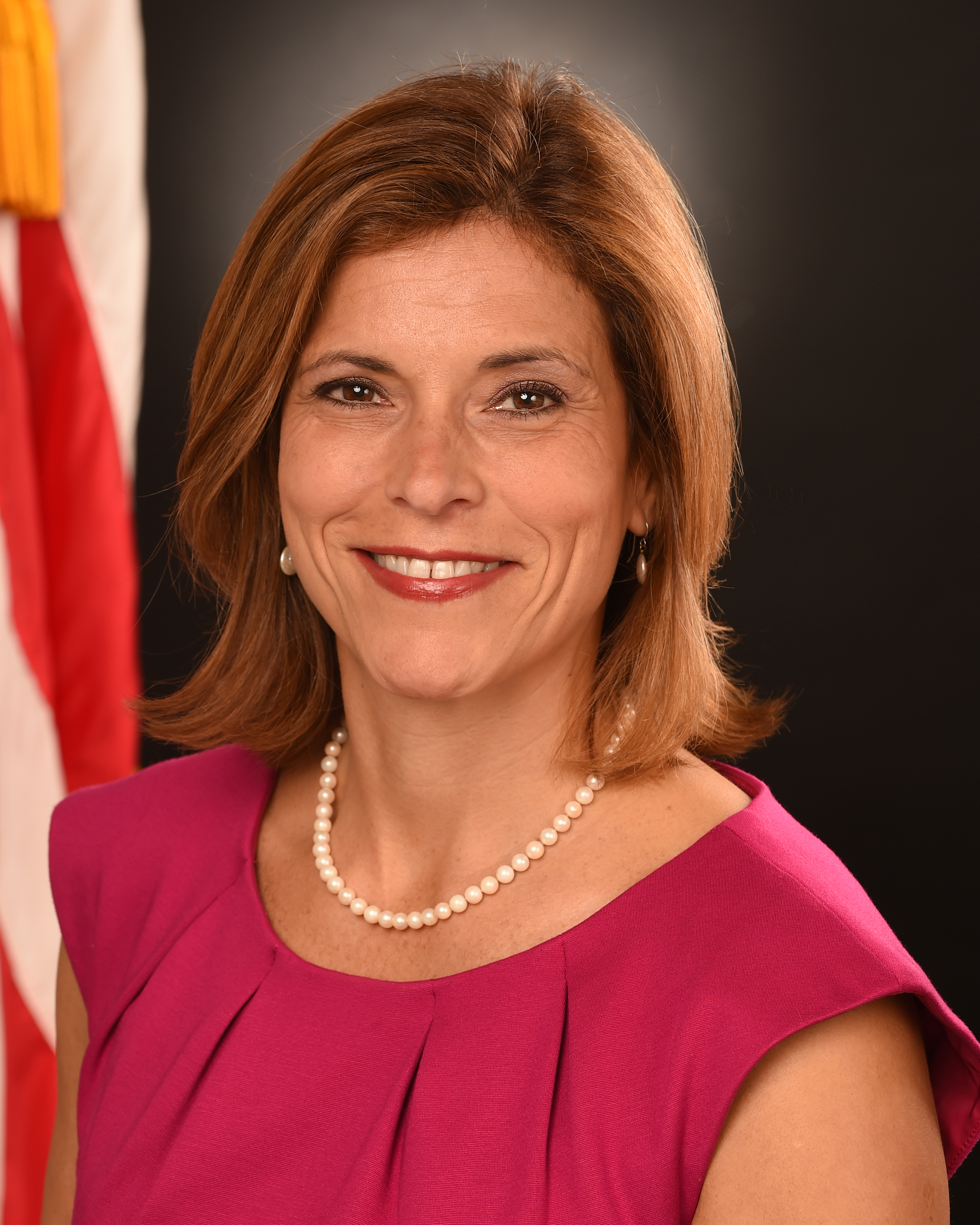
- Chiedi in 2015

Inspector General of the Department of Health and Human Services Acting
- In office June 1, 2019 – December 31, 2019
- President: Donald Trump
- Preceded by: Daniel R. Levinson
- Succeeded by: Christi Grimm

Personal details
- Education: Mount St. Mary's University (BA)
- Occupation: Administrator, government official

Joanne Chiedi is an American administrator and former government official working as the chief administrative officer of law firm DLA Piper since January 2020. Prior to this, Chiedi was the principal deputy inspector general and acting inspector general of the United States Department of Health and Human Services (HHS).

== Career ==
Chiedi was the deputy administrator for the Office of Redress Administration, which provided payments to survivors of the internment of Japanese Americans, as authorized by the Civil Liberties Act of 1988. She then became the Deputy Executive Officer for the Civil Rights Division of the Department of Justice. Afterwards, from 2005 to 2010, she was the deputy director for management in the HHS Office for Civil Rights. Chiedi was then the deputy inspector general for management and policy at HHS from 2010 to 2013, before being promoted to HHS principal deputy inspector general. Upon her retirement in December 2019, HHS Secretary Alex Azar praised her service, stating, "From work to revise the Anti-Kickback Statute's regulations to promote value-based arrangements and care coordination, to the creation of the first Chief Data Office in the IG community, the agency has made significant strides on many fronts under her watch."
