= Connable =

Connable is a surname. Notable people with the surname include:

- Ben Connable, American military strategist
- Joel Connable (1973–2012), American television host, news anchor, and reporter
