= Princeton School of Public and International Affairs =

Public policy school of Princeton University

Coordinates: 40.34835°N 74.65467°W

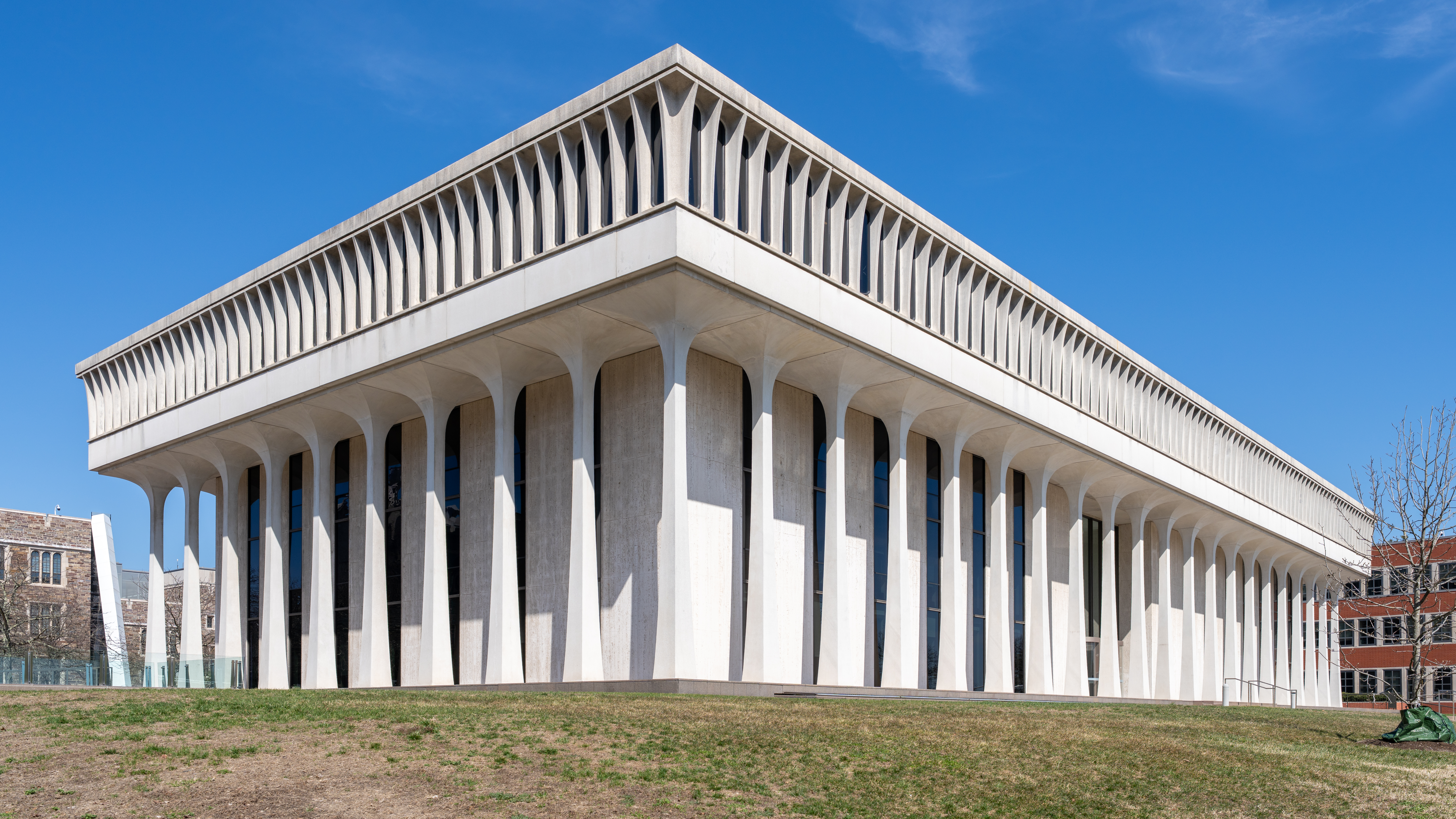
- Robertson Hall, home to the Princeton School of Public and International Affairs
- Type: Private
- Established: 1930
- Parent institution: Princeton University
- Affiliations: APSIA
- Dean: Amaney Jamal
- Faculty: 85 full-time faculty members and approximately 45 visiting professors, lecturers, and practitioners
- Students: Approximately 300 undergraduate students and approximately 190 graduate students
- Location: Princeton, New Jersey, U.S.
- Website: spia.princeton.edu

The Princeton School of Public and International Affairs (abbrev. SPIA; formerly the Woodrow Wilson School of Public and International Affairs) is a professional public policy school at Princeton University. The school provides an array of comprehensive coursework in the fields of international development, foreign policy, science and technology, and economics and finance through its undergraduate (AB) degrees, graduate Master of Public Affairs (MPA), Master of Public Policy (MPP), and PhD degrees.

== History ==
In 1930, Princeton University established the School of Public and International Affairs, which was originally meant to serve as an interdisciplinary program for undergraduate students in Princeton's liberal arts college. On February 23, 1930, the front page of The Sunday New York Times announced:

Princeton Founds Statesmen's School – Institution Will Train Youths for Public Life and Will Stress Internationalism – Hoover Hails The Project. De W.C. Poole Quits Diplomatic Service to Be Its Liaison Officer With World Affairs. The establishment of a school of public and international affairs at Princeton University was announced today by President John Grier Hibben in his annual message to the National Alumni Association. The school's primary purpose is to train young men for public life and to equip them—and others—with a broad sense of "the fundamentals of citizenship."

President Hibben made the announcement in Nassau Hall, "where in 1783 George Washington received the thanks of the Continental Congress for his conduct of the Revolutionary War." DeWitt Clinton Poole, a noted foreign service officer and "until recently counselor of the United States Embassy in Berlin" had been the prime advocate for the creation of the school. The next year, in August 1931, the Fédération Interalliée Des Anciens Combattants (FIDAC), the most influential international veterans association of the interwar period (representing nine million Allied veterans), chose Princeton to receive its educational medal for promoting world peace and understanding.

In 1948, the school added a graduate professional program and was renamed to honor Woodrow Wilson, who was the 13th president of the university, governor of New Jersey and the 28th president of the United States. In two of Wilson's speeches at the university – first during its 150th anniversary celebration in 1896 and again at his inauguration as the university's president in 1902 – he mentioned "Princeton in the nation's service." This phrase serves as the basis for the university's unofficial motto, which was amended in 2016 to "Princeton in the nation's service and in the service of humanity."

In 2015, student protesters forced Princeton to reconsider having the school named after Wilson due to his racist views, of which they disapproved. The protesting efforts were largely due to the organizational efforts of the Black Justice League. Despite the group no longer existing, faculty and new student activists pled for the university to apologize to the original members to recognize the BJL's perseverance. The Wilson Legacy Review Committee ultimately decided to keep his name attached to the school, observing that, as other notable men and women, Wilson had a "complex legacy of both positive and negative repercussions".

But on June 26, 2020, following the eruption of George Floyd protests and the resurgence of the Black Lives Matter movement, the Princeton University board of trustees decided to rename the Woodrow Wilson School the "Princeton School of Public and International Affairs," citing Wilson's "racist thinking and policies [that] make him an inappropriate namesake for a school or college whose scholars, students, and alumni must stand firmly against racism in all its forms." It was also announced that Wilson College, the first of Princeton's six undergraduate residential colleges, would be renamed First College. Woodrow Wilson opposed admitting African-American students to Princeton, and introduced racial segregation into the United States federal civil service as president.

From 2012 to 2021, Cecilia Rouse served as dean of the Princeton School until her confirmation as Chair of the Council of Economic Advisors under the Biden Administration.

== Academics ==
=== Undergraduate program ===
The school stresses a multidisciplinary approach to policy studies with undergraduate students at the Princeton School taking courses in at least four disciplines including economics, history, politics, psychology, sociology, and science policy. In their junior year, students must enroll in and complete a Policy Task Force, which addresses a specific public policy issue. Students conduct research, propose recommendations, and issue final reports. Students are also allowed to work towards certificates in an array of fields, including Global Health and Health Policy, Urban Studies, and the History and the Practice of Diplomacy.

=== Master's degrees ===
The two-year MPA program prepares students for international and domestic policy careers. All second-year MPA students must complete a Policy Workshop, which emphasizes policy implementation. Through the graduate policy workshops, students conduct field-based research and present their research and recommendations to clients. Students also develop analytical and quantitative skills through coursework emphasizing the political, economic, and behavioral aspects of complex policy issues. MPA candidates may select one of four fields of concentration:

- International Relations
- International Development
- Domestic Policy
- Economics and Public Policy

The one-year MPP program is designed for mid-career professionals, PhD research scientists, lawyers, and physicians who are involved in international and domestic public policy.

=== Doctoral degrees ===
The PhD in public affairs focuses on two research areas: security studies; and science, technology and environmental policy. The school works with other departments at the university to offer a joint degree program that combines work in a social science with a multidisciplinary perspective on economics problems. Graduate students also have the opportunity to pursue certificates in demography; health and health policy; science, technology and environmental policy; and urban policy/urban policy and planning. In addition to the MPA, MPP and PhD degrees, the school offers a four-year MPA/J.D. program, and has formal joint degree arrangements with law schools at Columbia University, New York University and Stanford University. Students often refer to the Princeton School by its colloquial abbreviation, "SPIA". The school also offers a joint degree program (JDP) in social policy, allowing students to take courses in the departments of politics, psychology, sociology, and economics.

=== Reputation and rankings ===
SPIA undergraduate programs were ranked 1st by IR faculty, 3rd by policymakers and think tank staffers in Foreign Policy's 2024 rankings. Its master's programs were ranked within the Top 6 while its PhD programs were ranked within the Top 3 across all groups of survey respondents.

Princeton SPIA rankings

Global
Foreign Policy – PhD	2-3
Foreign Policy – Master's	5-6
Foreign Policy – Bachelor's	1-3
QS – Politics	4
ARWU – Political Sciences	3

United States
Niche – Public Policy	1
U.S. News & World Report – Global Policy and Administration	2

== Robertson Hall ==
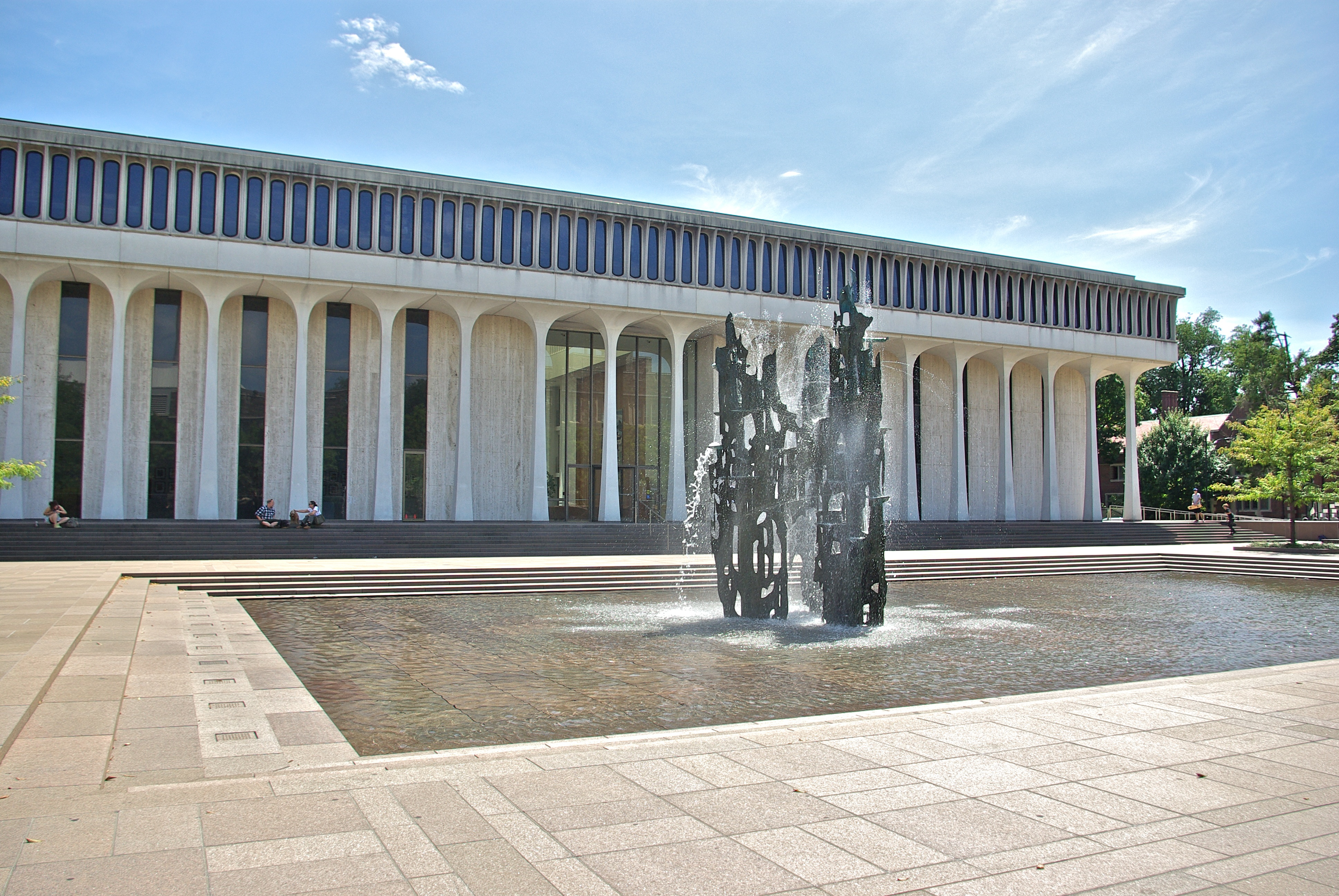
Robertson Hall with James FitzGerald's Fountain of Freedom in the foreground

In 1961, Charles '26 and Marie Robertson provided a gift to expand the graduate school. Their gift funded the construction of the School's current home, designed by Minoru Yamasaki, who also designed New York's original World Trade Center. To the north of the building is James FitzGerald's Fountain of Freedom (1966), colloquially the "SPIA fountain". "Before construction could begin [on Robertson], the building that had housed the School since 1952, then called Woodrow Wilson School Annex, had to be relocated." In May after two months of preparation, "the 3-story, L-shaped, 7,000,000-pound building was moved 296 feet in 12 hours by 38 men and 9 hydraulic jacks..." The Annex, renamed Corwin Hall, subsequently housed the department of political science and Center of International Studies. The new structure, completed in the fall of 1965, was originally named Woodrow Wilson Hall, but was "renamed Robertson Hall in 1988 to honor its benefactors" and as President Goheen characterized upon its completion, was "a fit embodiment and expression of the high aspiration we hold for the [SPIA]."

In approximately 2005, the SPIA established the Bernstein Gallery in Robertson Hall. The gallery "presents art exhibitions to stimulate thinking about contemporary policy issues and to enable understanding the world beyond the power of words. Each year, six curated shows are presented ... and ... are complemented by ... panel discussions with experts from Princeton University, the School and outside organizations." The exhibits are "...Integrated with the School's multidisciplinary approach ... to enhance the impact of the course curriculum and to deepen people's commitment to the ideals of public service." A retrospective of political art was held in 2017. The lower level lobby and gallery are named for Marver Bernstein, SPIA's first dean and his wife, Sheva. Bernstein participated in Robertson's architectural selection process and his wife, an interior designer, participated in its mid-century modern interior.

In 2012, the Princeton University Art Museum announced the installation of the "Circle of Animals/Zodiac Heads" exhibit by Chinese artist Ai Weiwei on Scudder Plaza.

In 2019–2020 Robertson Hall underwent a major renovation of its "offices, work areas, and gathering spaces" to provide more open, collaborative spaces. The exterior, auditorium, and lower-level classrooms were largely unchanged.

On October 5, 2019, the university dedicated a memorial marker, named Double Sights, on the west side of the Fountain of Freedom. Designed by 2019 MacArthur Fellow and Gish Prize winner Walter Hood, the memorial was meant to catalyze “stimulus to reflection and an invitation to dialogue" about the controversial legacy of Woodrow Wilson. The marker is a 39-foot statue consisting of a white column and a black column, coated in stone-like glass engraved with quotes displaying both the honorable and racist aspects of Wilson's legacy. The marker was the product of a recommendation by a 2015 University committee to create a “permanent marker” that “educates the campus community and others about the positive and negative dimensions of Wilson’s legacy.”

== Centers and programs ==
The Princeton School of Public and International Affairs has 19 unique centers and programs:

- Bendheim-Thoman Center for Research on Child Wellbeing (CRCW)
- Center for Arts and Cultural Policy Studies (CACPS)
- Center for Health and Wellbeing (CHW)
- Center for Information Technology Policy (CITP)
- Center for International Security Studies (CISS)
- Center for Policy Research on Energy and the Environment (C-PREE)
- Center for the Study of Democratic Politics (CSDP)
- China and the World Program (CWP)
- Education Research Section (ERS)
- Innovations for Successful Societies (Institutions for Fragile States)
- Julis-Rabinowitz Center for Public Policy and Finance (JRC)
- Liechtenstein Institute on Self-Determination (LISD)
- Niehaus Center for Globalization and Governance (NCGG)
- Office of Population Research (OPR)
- Princeton Survey Research Center (SRC)
- Program in Law and Public Policy (P•LAW)
- Program on Science and Global Security (SGS)
- Research Program in Development Economics (RPDE)
- Research Program in Political Economy (RPPE)

PolicyNet is a network of prominent public policy schools around the world, founded in 2005 as a joint venture between the Woodrow Wilson School of Public and International Affairs and the Centre for International Governance Innovation for interaction and collaboration on issues of common interest, curricular programs, joint research projects and other activities.

The school is a full member of the Association of Professional Schools of International Affairs (APSIA), a group of schools of public policy, public administration, and international studies.

== Notable alumni ==
- Bob Abernethy, television journalist
- Steve Adler, Mayor of Austin, Texas
- Samuel Alito, associate justice of the Supreme Court of the United States
- Nicholas Allard, dean and president of Brooklyn Law School
- Hady Amr, deputy assistant administrator, Bureau for the Middle East, U.S. Agency for International Development, former director, Brookings Doha Center, Brookings Institution
- Eduardo Bhatia, former Senate President in Puerto Rico
- Kristina Baehr, lawyer
- Jeremy Ben-Ami, former domestic policy adviser to President Bill Clinton and president of the Pro-Israel, Pro-Peace lobby, J Street
- Joshua B. Bolten, former White House Chief of Staff; former director of the Office of Management and Budget under George W. Bush
- Kit Bond, former U.S. Senator from Missouri, former Governor of Missouri
- Brendan Byrne, former Governor of New Jersey
- Simon Carcagno, professional rower for the U.S. National team
- Frank Carlucci, former Secretary of Defense
- Dick Cass (1968), president of the Baltimore Ravens from 2004 to 2022
- Barbara Cassani, founder of Go Fly and leader of London's successful bid for the 2012 Summer Olympics
- Steven Colloton, judge of the United States Court of Appeals for the Eighth Circuit
- Edward F. Cox, lawyer
- Ted Cruz, U.S. Senator from Texas, former Solicitor General of Texas
- Shai Davidai, Israeli assistant professor at Columbia Business School, advocate against antisemitism
- Mitch Daniels, former Governor of Indiana, former director of the Office of Management and Budget under George W. Bush
- Joseph Fichera, founder and CEO of Saber Partners, auction rate securities expert.
- Bill Frist, former U.S. Senator from Tennessee, former Senate Majority Leader
- Nellie Gorbea, Secretary of State of Rhode Island
- Robert L. Gordon III, former U.S. Deputy Under Secretary of Defense for Military Community and Family Policy
- Mohsin Hamid, author of The Reluctant Fundamentalist
- Michael Huerta, administrator of the Federal Aviation Administration, former managing director of the 2002 Winter Olympics held in Salt Lake City, Utah
- Timothy Hwang, founder and CEO of FiscalNote
- James A. Johnson, former chairman of Fannie Mae and Democratic "wise man"
- Robert L. Johnson, founder of BET
- Nicholas Katzenbach, former United States Attorney General
- Wendy Kopp, founder of Teach for America
- Pedro Pablo Kuczynski, former president of Peru
- Anthony Lake, executive director of UNICEF, former National Security Advisor (1993–1997)
- Leonard Lance, U.S. Representative for New Jersey's 7th District
- David J. Lane, U.S. Ambassador and former philanthropy executive
- William Lynn, former U.S. Deputy Secretary of Defense
- Susan L. Marquis, Frank and Marcia Carlucci Dean of the Frederick S. Pardee RAND Graduate School and vice president, innovation, RAND Corporation; chair of the PSPIA Advisory Council
- David McCormick, former Under Secretary of the Treasury for International Affairs
- Mike McCurry, former White House Press Secretary under Bill Clinton
- Jeff Merkley, U.S. Senator from Oregon, former Speaker of the Oregon House of Representatives
- Judith Miller, former reporter for The New York Times, covered the Plame affair
- Nate Morris, American Entrepreneur
- Raj Mukherji, senator representing New Jersey's 32nd district and tech entrepreneur
- Ralph Nader, consumer protection lawyer, author and political activist
- Joseph S. Nye, Jr., former dean of the John F. Kennedy School of Government at Harvard University
- Michael E. O'Hanlon, senior fellow at The Brookings Institution
- Robert C. Orr, United Nations Assistant Secretary-General for Policy Coordination and Strategic Planning
- David H. Petraeus, United States Army General Commander, International Security Assistance Force (ISAF) and commander, U.S. Forces Afghanistan (USFOR-A), and former director of the Central Intelligence Agency
- Natalie Quillian, White House deputy chief of staff (2023–present), White House deputy Coronavirus response coordinator (2021–2022)
- Stuart J. Rabner, Chief Justice of the New Jersey Supreme Court
- Asha Rangappa, director of admissions and a senior lecturer at Yale University's Jackson Institute for Global Affairs
- Chuck Reed, mayor of San Jose, California
- Chip Reid, national correspondent, CBS News
- Graham Richard, mayor of Fort Wayne, Indiana
- Anthony Romero, executive director of the American Civil Liberties Union
- William Rusher, publisher, National Review
- John P. Sarbanes, U.S. Representative for Maryland's 3rd District
- Paul Sarbanes, former U.S. Senator from Maryland
- Michael H. Schill, president of the University of Oregon, and former dean of UCLA School of Law and the University of Chicago Law School
- Terri A. Sewell, U.S. Representative for Alabama's 7th District
- Jesse Singal, American journalist
- Janmejaya Sinha, chairman, Asia-Pacific, Boston Consulting Group
- George P. Shultz, former Secretary of State, former Secretary of the Treasury, former Secretary of Labor
- P. W. Singer, senior fellow, director, 21st Century Defense Initiative, Brookings Institution
- Anne-Marie Slaughter, former director of policy planning, United States Department of State, former dean of the Princeton School of Public and International Affairs
- Bob Taft, former Governor of Ohio
- John Turitzin, vice president of Marvel Entertainment
- Paul Volcker, former Chairman of the Federal Reserve
- Brady Walkinshaw, former State Representative representing Washington’s 43rd district
- Sanjay Malhotra, 26th Governor of Reserve Bank of India

== Faculty ==
Nearly all full-time Princeton School faculty members have dual appointments with other departments at the university. The school also has visiting professors, lecturers, and practitioners from the world of public and international affairs that teach. Faculty members at the school include Nobel Laureates, Pulitzer Prize winners, a university president, and former ambassadors. Nobel Laureates include Angus Deaton, Daniel Kahneman, Paul Krugman, and Arthur Lewis.

== Controversy ==
In July 2002, dissenting family members of the Robertson Foundation board, which was established initially by a $35 million gift in 1961, filed suit seeking to more narrowly focus the SPIA curriculum on training for careers in government and public service vs. Princeton's broader conception of "public affairs" which "embraces some non-government activities, for example, certain types of work in journalism, in private foundations, and in business, labor and consumer organizations." A settlement was reached in 2008.
