= Nancy Staudt =

American legal scholar (born 1963)

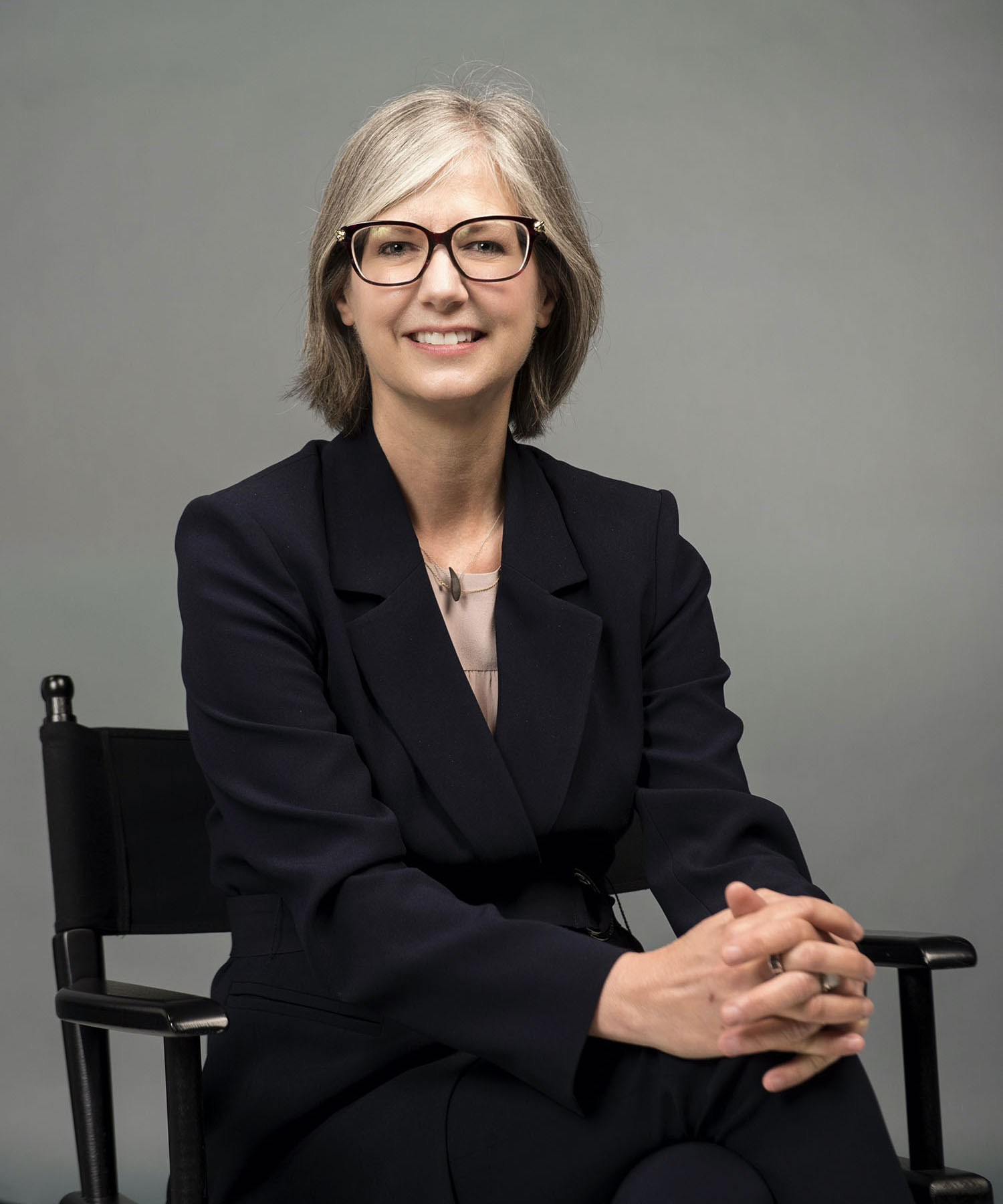

Vice President of Innovation, RAND Corporation; Frank and Marcia Carlucci Dean, RAND School of Public Policy
- Incumbent
- Assumed office October 2021
- Preceded by: Susan L. Marquis

Personal details
- Born: August 4, 1963 (age 62)
- Education: Ohio State University (BA); University of Minnesota (JD); University of Chicago (PhD)
- Profession: Dean; Lawyer
- Website: www.rand.org/about/people/s/staudt_nancy.html

Nancy Christine Staudt (born August 4, 1963) is the Frank and Marcia Carlucci Dean of the RAND School of Public Policy and the Vice President of Innovation at RAND Corporation. She is a scholar in tax, tax policy, and empirical legal studies.

== Early life and education ==
Born in Akron, Ohio, Nancy Staudt grew up in a large family. She attended St. Vincent-St. Mary Elementary and High School. She had a paper route for many years, delivering the Akron Beacon Journal to families in her small West Akron neighborhood. She worked her way through College and Law School. Staudt received her B.A. from Ohio State University, her J.D. from the University of Minnesota School of Law, and her Ph.D. from the University of Chicago Harris School of Public Policy.

== Career ==
Staudt began her tenure as Vice President of Innovation at RAND Corporation and Frank and Marcia Carlucci Dean of RAND School of Public Policy on October 11, 2021.

Previously, she was dean of Washington University School of Law from May 2014 through September 2021, having returned to the school after serving as professor from 2000 to 2006. At Washington University in St. Louis, she chaired the university-Wide Steering Committee on Diversity and Inclusion (2015), tasked with putting together a two-year action plan for the university. Under her leadership, the School of Law rose in ranking to No. 16 among U.S. law schools, according to U.S. News & World Report, and Staudt also led a capital campaign that raised funds to expand the scope of the school's clinical education program, enhance the number of faculty members with named professorships, and increase scholarships for students by millions of dollars.

Prior to returning to St. Louis in 2014, Staudt was vice dean for faculty and academic affairs at the USC Gould School of Law and was the inaugural holder of the Edward G. Lewis Chair in Law and Public Policy. She also served as the founding co-director of USC's Schwarzenegger Institute of State and Global Policy.

From 2006 to 2011, Staudt was the Class of 1940 Research Professor of Law at Northwestern University Pritzker School of Law. She previously served as associate professor and then professor at University at Buffalo Law School.

Staudt has held visiting professorships at Vanderbilt University, Boston University, and the Interdisciplinary Center in Herzliya, Israel, and she has been a visiting scholar at Stanford University. She has taught classes in Federal Income Taxation, Corporate Taxation, Estate and Gift Taxation, Property Taxation, State and Local Taxation, and Law & Public Policy.

== Grants, honors and awards ==
- Zumberge Interdisciplinary Grant, 2013–2014, University of Southern California
- National Science Foundation Grant (Methodology, Measurement, and Statistics Program & Law and Social Science Program), 2005–2006
- Grant (Law and Social Science Program), 2003

== Selected bibliography ==
- The Crisis of Race in Higher Education (Emerald Press, 2017) (edited with William Tate & Ashley Macrander)
- The Judicial Power of the Purse: How Courts Fund National Defense in Times of Crisis (University of Chicago Press, 2011) (Reviewed in 125 Harvard Law Review 378 (2011))
- The Major Acts of Congress (Macmillan Press 2003) (edited with Brian Landsberg, Al Brophy, & Tom Sargentich)
- "The Supercharged IPO," 67 Vanderbilt Law Review (2014) (with Victor Fleischer)
- Avoidance Transactions in the United States (Oxford University Press, 2013) (book chapter with Joshua Blank)
- "Corporate Shams," 87 NYU Law Rev. 1641 (2012) (with Joshua Blank)
- "What Have We Learned About Women's Economic Lives Since 1975?," 13 Georgetown Journal of Gender and the Law 59 (2012) (with April Wu and Chao Wang)
- "Causal Diagrams for Empirical Legal Research: Methodology for Identifying Causation, Avoiding Bias, and Interpreting Results," 10 Journal of Law, Probability & Risk 329 (2011) (with Tyler VanderWeele)
- "The Macroeconomic Court: Rhetoric and Implications of New Deal Decision Making," 5 Northwestern Journal of Law and Social Policy 87-117 (2010) (with Yilie He)
- "Methodological Advances and Empirical Legal Scholarship: A Note on Cox and Miles' Voting Rights Act Study," 109 Columbia Law Review Sidebar 42-54 (2009) (with Tyler VanderWeele)
- "Economic Trends and Judicial Outcomes: A Macro-Theory of the Court," 58 Duke Law Review 1191 (2009) (with Tom Brennan and Lee Epstein)
- "The Political Economy of Judging," 93 Univ. of Minnesota Law Review 1503–1534 (2009) (with Tom Brennan and Lee Epstein)
- "On the Capacity of the Roberts Court to Generate Consequential Precedent," 86 Univ. North Carolina Law Review 1299–1332 (2008) (with Barry Friedman and Lee Epstein)
- "On the Role of Ideological Homogeneity in Generating Consequential Constitutional Decisions," 10 Penn. Journal of Constitutional Law 361-386 (2008) (with Barry Friedman and Lee Epstein)
- "Judicial Decisions as Legislation: Congressional Oversight of Supreme Court Tax Cases, 1954-2005," 82 NYU Law Review 1340 (2007) (with René Lindstädt and Jason O'Connor)
- "The Ideological Component of Judging in the Taxation Context," 84 Washington University Law Review 1797 (2007) (with Lee Epstein and Peter Wiedenbeck)
- "Redundant Tax and Spending Programs," 100 Northwestern Law Review 1197 (2006)
- "Judging Statutes: Interpretive Regimes," 38 Loyola of Los Angeles Law Review 1909 (2005) (with Peter Wiedenbeck, Lee Epstein, René Lindstädt, & Ryan J. Vander Wielen)
- "Foreword: Interdisciplinary Theories of Statutory Interpretation," 38 Loyola Law Review 1899(2005) (with Ellen Aprill)
- "Agenda Setting in Supreme Court Tax Cases: Lessons from the Blackmun Papers," 52 Buffalo Law Review 889-922 (2005)
- "The Role of Qualifications in the Confirmation of Nominees to the U.S. Supreme Court," 32 Florida State Univ. Law Review 1145 (2005) (with Lee Epstein, Jeffery A. Segal, and René Lindstädt)
- "On Tournaments for Appointing Great Justices to the U.S. Supreme Court," 78 S. Cal. Law Review 157-80 (2004) (with WERL members)
- "Modeling Standing," 79 NYU Law Review 612-84 (2004)
- "Tax Talk," 51 Canadian Tax Review 1931–52 (2003) (book review)
- "Judging Statutes: Thoughts on Statutory Interpretation and Notes for a Project on the Internal Revenue Code," 13 Washington University Journal of Law and Policy 305-33 (2003) (with Lee Epstein & Peter Wiedenbeck)
- "Foreword: Empirical Taxation," 13 Washington University Journal of Law & Policy 1-8 (2003)
- "Taxpayers in Court: A Systematic Study of a (Misunderstood) Standing Doctrine," 52 Emory Law Journal 771- 848 (2003)
- "Taxation Without Representation," 55 NYU Tax Law Review 554-600 (2002)
- "Women's Economic Security in Old Age: The Importance of Private Savings," 16 New York Law School Journal of Human Rights 232-38 (1999) (symposium comments)
- "Constitutional Politics and Balanced Budgets," 1998 University of Illinois Law Review 1105–74 (1998)
- "The Theory and Practice of Taxing Difference," 65 University of Chicago Law Review 653-83 (1998) (book review)
- "Tax Theory and "Mere Critique": A Reply to Professor Zelenak," 76 North Carolina Law Review 1581–95 (1998)
- "The Hidden Costs of the Progressivity Debate," 50 Vanderbilt Law Review 919-91 (1997) reprinted in Critical Tax Theory: An Introduction (Cambridge University Press 2009)
- "Taxation and Gendered Citizenship," 6 S. Cal. Review of Law & Women's Studies 533-50 (1997)
- "Taxing Housework," 84 Georgetown Law Journal 1571–1647 (1996) reprinted in Critical Tax Theory: An Introduction (Cambridge University Press 2009)
- "The Political Economy of Taxation: A Critical Review of a Classic," 30 Law & Society Review 651-66 (1996) (book review)
- "Note: "Controlling' Securities Fraud: Proposed Liability Standards for Controlling Persons Under the 1933 and 1934 Securities Acts," 72 Minnesota Law Review 930 (1988)
