= Amy B. Heimberger =

American neurosurgeon and physician-scientist

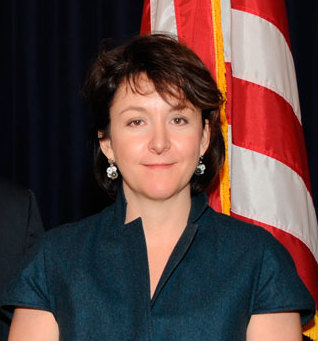
- Heimberger in 2007

Member of the Advisory Board of the National Cancer Institute
- Incumbent
- Assumed office September 15, 2021 Serving with Nilofer S. Azad, Luis Alberto Diaz, Jr., Christopher R. Friese, Ashani Weeraratna and Karen Winkfield
- President: Joe Biden
- Director: Norman Sharpless
- Scientific career
- Education: University of Missouri; Washington University School of Medicine
- Awards: PECASE (2007)
- Fields: Neurosurgery
- Workplaces: University of Texas; Northwestern University

Amy B. Heimberger is an American neurosurgeon and physician-scientist. She is the Jean Malnati Miller Professor of Neurological Surgery, vice-chair for research in the department of Neurological Surgery at Feinberg School of Medicine and scientific director of The Malnati Brain Tumor Institute at the Robert H. Lurie Comprehensive Cancer Center.

Heimberger completed a B.A. in biology at University of Missouri during 1989. She earned a M.D. from Washington University School of Medicine in 1995. She finished her internship in surgery (1996) and residency in neurosurgery (1970) at Duke University Hospital. In 2022, Heimberger earned her PhD from the University of Missouri and received an honorary degree. She won a Presidential Early Career Award for Scientists and Engineers for her research on central nervous system immune biology while working at the University of Texas.

In September 2021, Heimberger was appointed by U.S. president Joe Biden to the National Cancer Institute's National Cancer Advisory.

In May 2024, Heimberger was a contributor to a study that discovered new behaviors in the central nervous system tumor meningioma. The study demonstrated a large amount of variety between cells, making it more resistant to an unspecialized treatment.

Heimberger is a Project Co-Leader for the Brain Tumor Specialized Program of Research Excellence (SPORE) grant from the National Cancer Institute awarded to the department of neurosurgery at Northwestern. The SPORE is one of just six brain tumor programs nationwide to receive the designation and recognizes Northwestern as a premier institution for innovative, translational research. The NCI’s SPORE grants fund interdisciplinary, collaborative research projects in specific cancer types and are intended to rapidly move research discoveries from the laboratory into the clinic.
