= Martin C. Libicki =

- Education: Massachusetts Institute of Technology; University of California, Berkeley
- Occupation: Scholar

Martin C. Libicki is an American scholar and Professor at the Frederick S. Pardee RAND Graduate School in Santa Monica, California.

== Early life ==
Martin C. Libicki graduated from the Massachusetts Institute of Technology (MIT) in Cambridge, Massachusetts, where he received a Bachelor of Science degree in Mathematics. He went on to receive a master's degree in City and Regional Planning as well as a PhD in Economics from the University of California, Berkeley.

== Career ==
He worked for the National Defense University for twelve years. He then served on staff for the United States Navy for three years. He went on to work for the U.S. General Accounting Office's Energy and Minerals Division.

He joined the RAND Corporation in 1998, where he served as Senior Management Scientist and Professor at the Frederick S. Pardee RAND Graduate School in Santa Monica, California. He has also worked as a consultant for the United States Department of Justice, the Defense Advanced Research Projects Agency (DARPA) and the Federal Bureau of Investigation (FBI).

He has participated in Track II diplomacy with regards to negotiations between the United States and China on cybersecurity. On the United States response to possible cyberattacks, he has argued for a conservative approach, suggesting that overreacting may hurt US national security interests more.

He currently holds the Maryellen and Richard L. Keyser Distinguished Visiting Professorship in Cyber Security Studies at the U.S. Naval Academy, where in addition to teaching, carries out research in cyber war, and the general impact of information technology on domestic and national security.

== Bibliography ==
=== Books ===
- Information Technology Standards: Quest for the Common Byte (Digital Press, 1995).
- Who Runs What in the Global Information Grid (2000).
- Conquest in Cyberspace: National Security and Information Warfare (Cambridge University Press, 2007).
- Exploring Terrorist Targeting Preferences (with Peter Chalk and Melanie W. Sisson, 2007).
- How Terrorist Groups End: Lessons for Countering al Qa'ida (with Seth G. Jones, 2008).
- Cyberdeterrence and Cyberwar (2009).
- How Insurgencies End (with Ben Connable, 2010).
- Hackers Wanted: An Examination of the Cybersecurity Labor Market (with David Senty and Julia Pollak, 2014)
- Cyberspace in peace and war. Annapolis, Md.: Naval Institute Press. 2016.

=== Critical studies and reviews of Libicki's work ===
Cyberspace in peace and war

- Tangredi, Sam J. (Autumn 2019). "Full-bodied cyber without the hype". Naval War College Review. 72 (4): 160–163.
