= Yılmaz Argüden =

Turkish stratejist and governance expert

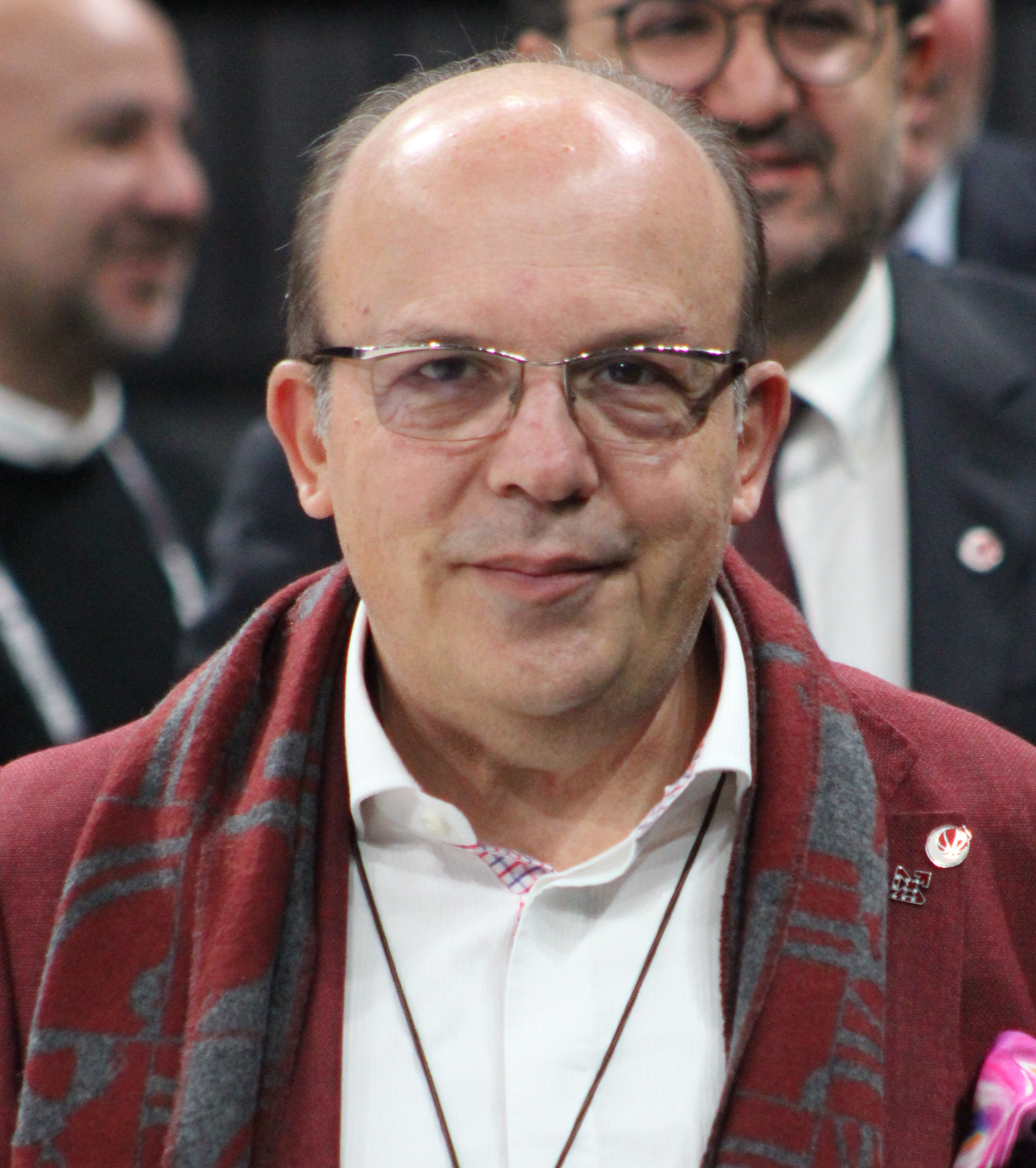

Academic background
- Education: Frederick S. Pardee RAND Graduate School (PhD); Boğaziçi University, Industrial engineering (BS); Tarsus American College

Academic work
- Discipline: Management consulting, business, strategy, governance, sustainability
- Website: arguden.net

Yılmaz Argüden is a Turkish strategist, governance expert, and author. He is the founder and Chairman of ARGE Consulting, an Istanbul-based management consulting firm. Argüden has served as the Chairman of the Turkish office of Rothschild & Co, Turkish steel producer Erdemir, Governance Committee of Business at OECD, and United Nations Global Compact Local Networks. He also served as the Vice-Chair of the Turkish Basketball Federation.

== Education ==
Argüden received his Bachelors of Science degree in Industrial engineering from the Boğaziçi University with top Academic Achievement Award and Rector's Prize for student leadership. He received his PhD in policy analysis from the Frederick S. Pardee RAND Graduate School.

== Career ==
Argüden started his career in Koç Holding in 1977. From 1980 to 1985, he worked as a policy analyst for RAND Corporation. He has worked at the World Bank as a senior officer between 1985 and 1988 before returning to Ankara upon Turkish government's invitation. In 1991, he served as the Chief Economic Advisor to the Prime Minister Mesut Yılmaz. In the same year, he founded ARGE Consulting. He served as an independent director on over 70 boards in different countries and as the Chairman of Turkish steel producer Erdemir (1997–99).

In 2005, Argüden was initially selected as the Senior Advisor of Rothschild & Co investment bank. In 2006, he became the Country Representative of Rothschild, and in 2007, he was appointed as the Founding Chairman of the Turkish office of Rothschild & Co. Argüden served as the Chairman of the Governance Committee of the Business at OECD and as a member of the IFC’s Corporate Governance Advisory Board. He is also the Chairman of the Trustees of the Argüden Governance Academy and has authored numerous books, articles, and columns focusing on business, strategy, and governance issues.

He initiated the National Quality Movement in 1998 as the chairman of National Quality Association, KalDer, and served on the board of UN Global Compact as the elected Chair of Local Networks between 2013 and 2015.

Argüden was named a Global Leader for Tomorrow by the World Economic Forum (1999), received the Distinguished Citizenship Award for his efforts in the development of Turkish-American relations (2008), and the Distinguished Industry Leadership Award from the International Industrial Engineering Society (IEOM) (2022).

== Selected publications ==
- Argüden, Yılmaz (2011). Keys to Governance: Strategic Leadership for Quality of Life. Palgrave Macmillan. doi:10.1057/9780230348714. ISBN 978-0-230-34871-4.
- Argüden, Yılmaz (2009). Boardroom Secrets: Corporate Governance for Quality of Life. Palgrave Macmillan. doi:10.1057/9780230248298. ISBN 978-0-230-24829-8.
- "Measuring the effectiveness of corporate governance". Insead Knowledge. 2010.
- "Attitude is everything". Insead Knowledge. 2011.
- Arguden, Yilmaz (2011). "Global Boards Help Make Companies Global". Harvard Business Review.
- Arguden, Yilmaz (2012). "Why Boards Need More Women". Harvard Business Review.
- Raman, Anand (2009). "Obama and the Power of Inclusion". Harvard Business Review.
- "Europe's Dilemma: Values vs Interests and Protectionism vs Leadership" (PDF). Europe@Risk: A Report by the Global Risk Network. 2006.
- "A Corporate Governance Model" (PDF). International Finance Corporation Private Sector Opinion. 17. 2010.
- "Responsible Boards–Action Plan for a Sustainable Future" (PDF). International Finance Corporation Private Sector Opinion. 19. 2010.
- "Diversity at the Head Table" (PDF). International Finance Corporation Private Sector Opinion. 36. 2010.
- "Rio+20 Was a Bust". The Globalist. 2012.
- "Consensual Delegation of Sovereignty". The Globalist. 2009.
- "From Global Crises to Global Governance". The Globalist. 2009.
- Sustainable Success Model (PDF). ARGE Consulting Publications. 2021. ISBN 978-605-2288-14-6.
