= Charles Wolf Jr. =

American economic advisor (1924–2016)

- Born: August 1, 1924; Forest Hills, New York, U.S.
- Died: October 24, 2016 (aged 92); Los Angeles, California, U.S.
- Occupation: Economist
- Years active: 1955–2015

Charles Wolf Jr. (August 1, 1924 – October 24, 2016) was a senior economic advisor at the RAND Corporation (June 23, 1955 – October 24, 2016). He was also a senior research fellow at the Hoover Institution at Stanford University and was on the advisory board of the Center for International Business and Economic Research at the UCLA Anderson School of Management. He was a board member of Capital Income Builder and of Capital World Growth and Income, Inc., and a member of the American Economic Association, the Econometric Society, the Council on Foreign Relations, and the International Institute for Strategic Studies in London. He is noted for predicting the economic collapse of the Soviet Union in the 1980s, for downplaying fears that Japan would overtake the United States, and for unsuccessfully demanding the resignation of Daniel Ellsberg two years before Ellsberg leaked the Pentagon Papers.

Wolf’s research focused on how economic forces shape the international political environment and how economic instruments can advance U.S. and Western interests. This way of thinking has been a complement to the political and military analyses that typically dominate these discussions. His research also contributed to the respective competencies of market forces and governments.

== Career ==
Wolf served as a Foreign Service Officer with the United States Department of State (1945–1947, 1949–1953). In the early 1950s, he was a visiting professor of economics and Asian studies at Cornell University and an assistant professor of economics and Far East studies at the University of California, Berkeley. He joined the RAND Corporation in 1955 and headed the Economics Department from 1967 to 1981. In 1965 his name appeared on a list of academics involved with Project Camelot. He served as founding dean of the Frederick S. Pardee RAND Graduate School from 1970 to 1997; he taught at the school until his death. He died a heart failure on October 24, 2016 in Los Angeles, California, United States

== Awards ==
In 2007, Wolf received the Order of the Rising Sun, Gold Rays with Neck Ribbon, from the government of Japan. He was recognized for helping to nurture U.S. public opinion that was favorable to Japan.

== Education ==
Wolf received BS, Masters, and PhD degrees in economics from Harvard University. BS was earned before service in WWII, the latter two degrees after his foreign service immediately after the War in the Pacific.
