= Joel Connable =

American television news anchor (1973–2012)

Joel Connable (February 5, 1973 – November 6, 2012) was an American television host, news anchor, and reporter for KOMO-TV in Seattle, Washington. He also worked as a travel journalist, running a travel website and a company called Travel TV Inc. He was a former evening news anchor at NBC6 in Miami. He was named "Best News Anchor," by the New Times Magazine in 2009. Connable made regular appearances as a travel expert on Fox News, CBS television stations, KTLA, the BBC, and other television networks. Connable also anchored and reported the news for CBS in Los Angeles and South Carolina as well as for MSNBC and Early Today, on NBC. Connable was also a former private pilot and former paramedic from Long Island, New York. He was also a writer for the Huffington Post and had a weekly travel radio show on Cox Radio Stations.

== Early life and education ==
Connable was adopted in 1973 in New Orleans, Louisiana, by his parents who lived on Long Island, New York. He grew up in Roslyn Estates and attended the Roslyn Public Schools. His father is a writer and former speechwriter for the president of Columbia University in New York. Connable's mother is a writer, and is involved in politics. His parents met at the University of Michigan, where they were both students. Joel Connable's brother, Ben Connable, retired from his position in the US Marine Corps as an Arabic linguist and a Major who served several tours of duty in Iraq and Afghanistan.

Connable was an editor on his high school newspaper, The Hilltop Beacon. He was almost suspended during his senior year for publishing a story about the lack of fire extinguishers in the high school. He was known for fighting censorship by the school's administration to make sure stories made the front page for students. While at high school, he won second prize in the Martin Luther King Jr. Heritage Project Essay Contest at Sagamore Hill National Historic Site. Joel attended University of Southern California, studying broadcast journalism at the Annenberg School for Communication. He also studied at Tulane University in New Orleans and Columbia University in New York.

Prior to entering journalism, Connable worked as a paramedic for the Nassau County Police Department. He received his paramedic license from the State of New York and New York City Medical Advisory Council certification in 1992. He was trained at St. Vincent's Hospital Institute of Emergency Care in Paramedic Class #12. Connable worked alone on a one-person ambulance where he was assisted by police officers on emergency calls. The Nassau County Police Department operates the only full-time EMS service in Nassau County. He also volunteered as a Captain/Paramedic in Nassau County, New York for a local ambulance corps.

== Broadcasting career ==
Connable's first broadcasting job was as a newscaster with CBS affiliate WLTX in Columbia, South Carolina, doing a segment called the Restaurant Report Card in South Carolina, where he reported the state health inspection scores of restaurants across the state. He handed out one Golden Spatula every week to the one restaurant that received the highest grade. Today there are over 200 Golden Spatulas hanging in restaurants around the Midlands of South Carolina. Connable also did a segment called "Big Money Monday" where he traveled with State Treasurer Grady Patterson to notify people that they were owned money (unclaimed property) by the State. In the weekly segment, Connable brought the 82-year-old State Treasurer with him to surprise people at their homes. Connable worked in a special consumer unit called "The On Your Side Team," where he and another reporter, Adam Murphy, answered calls about rip-offs and scams, and helped people get their money back or notified the public about bad businesses. The On Your Side Team turned News19's ratings around after years of being in second and third place.

After three and a half years at News19, Connable was hired at CBS2/KCAL-TV in Los Angeles, California. He spent three years there as a reporter and then in 2005, Connable moved to WTVJ, the NBC affiliate in Miami as the evening news anchor. He also worked as a consumer and investigative reporter, as a fill-in anchor for Early Today on NBC News in New York and as an anchor for MSNBC.

== Honors and awards ==
Connable earned several Emmy awards for reporting. He was honored by the Los Angeles Press Club and the Associated Press for his breaking news and feature reporting.

== Death ==
Connable had Type 1 diabetes since he was 13 years old. He carried an insulin pump with him 24 hours a day. He was named as Volunteer of the Year by the Juvenile Diabetes Research Foundation in 2005 for his work to help find a cure to the disease.

On November 6, 2012, it was reported that Connable had died, supposedly due to a seizure brought on by a malfunctioning diabetes pump machine.

== Movie and Television Appearances ==
- Paparazzi 2004
- Threat Matrix 2002

== Awards ==
- Los Angeles Press Club - 2004 - Best Feature Story
- Nominated for 2010 Emmy Award - Best Human Interest Story - The Ladder Shop - story about San Francisco firefighters and how the department builds their own wooden ladders.
- Los Angeles Area Emmys - News Feature Reporting - 2004
- Emmy Award - 2003 - Outstanding Feature Reporting - Los Angeles
- Emmy Award - 2004 - Best Breaking News Coverage - Los Angeles
- Emmy Award - 2002 - Best Spot News Reporting
- Emmy Award - 2000 - Best Series Reporting
- Emmy Award - 2001 - Best Feature Reporting
- Emmy Award - 2001 - Best Breaking News Report
- Associated Press Award - 2000 - 2nd Place - Investigative Reporting
- Associated Press Award - 2005 - 2nd Place Investigative Reporting
- Edward R Murrow Award - 2004 - Best Feature Report
- Commendation from the State of South Carolina - 2000 - Consumer Advocacy
- Volunteer of the Year - Juvenile Diabetes Research Foundation - 2004
- World Travel Awards - 1st Place Travel Reporting
