= Mark Albrecht =

American executive

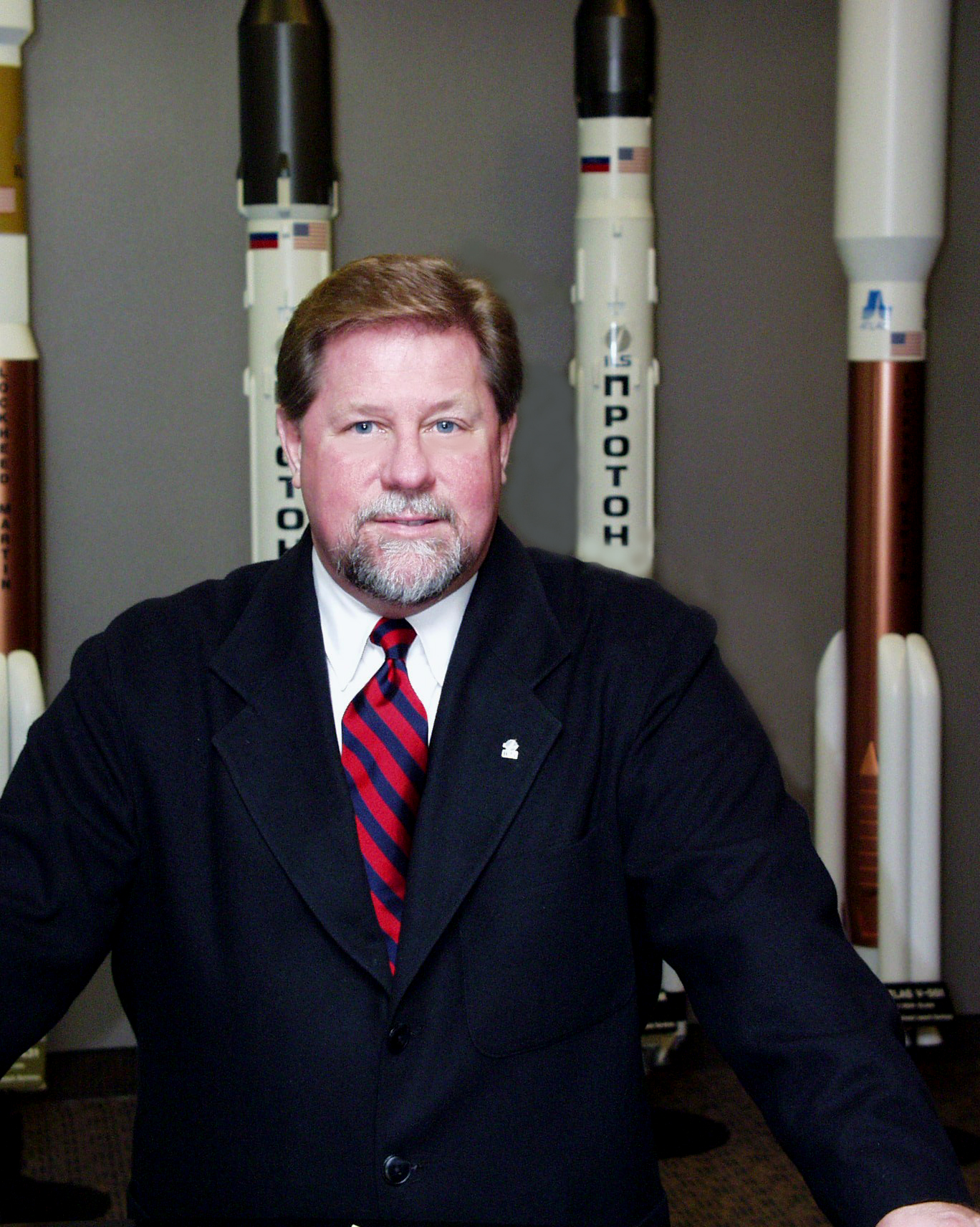
- Mark Albrecht – 2004

Personal details
- Born: 1950 (age 75–76) St. Louis, Missouri, U.S.
- Party: Republican
- Education: University of California, Los; Angeles (BA, MA); Pardee Rand Graduate School (PhD)

Mark J. Albrecht is an American aerospace and telecommunications executive. He is credited in government with reform of NASA and implementation of the "faster, cheaper, better" approach to space development and in the space launch business is credited for inventing and implementing the concept of "mutual backup" that revolutionized commercial space launch.

== Early life and education ==
Albrecht was born in St. Louis, Missouri. He completed his BA and MA in history from UCLA (Phi Beta Kappa) and PhD from the Pardee RAND Graduate School.

== Career ==
Albrecht was the Legislative Assistant for National Security Affairs to United States Senator Pete Wilson of California from 1983–1989. He was the executive secretary of the National Space Council from 1989–1992 and was the principal advisor to President George H. W. Bush on space. He was a senior executive at SAIC from 1992–1997 and was President of Lockheed Martin's International Launch Services from 1999–2006. Albrecht is the author of best selling Falling Back To Earth : A Firsthand Account Of The Great Space Race And The End Of The Cold War.

Albrecht has collaborated to Project 2025; he is listed among the contributors.

== Awards ==
Albrecht was awarded the NASA Distinguished Service Medal and the DOD distinguished civilian service medal and is the recipient of the Space Pioneer award of the National Space Society.

== Personal life ==
He has three children, one of them is Alexander "Alex" Albrecht.
