= Office of Inspector General of the United States Department of Health and Human Services =

Counsel with oversight of portfolio of programs

Inspector General of the United States Department of Health and Human Services
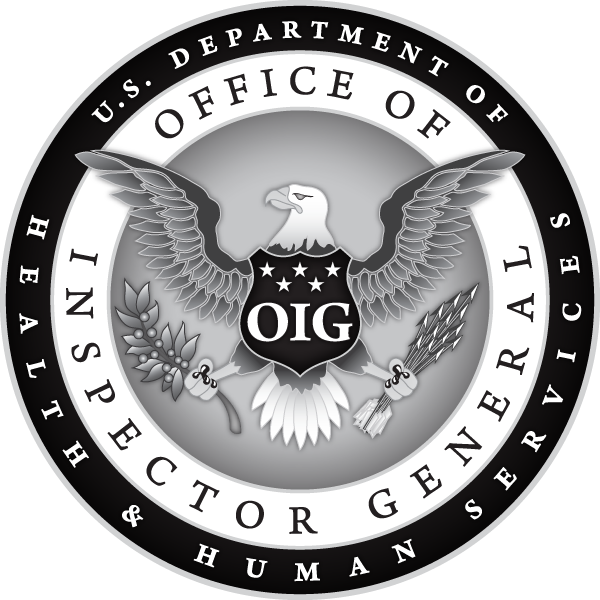
- Logo of the HHS Office of Inspector General

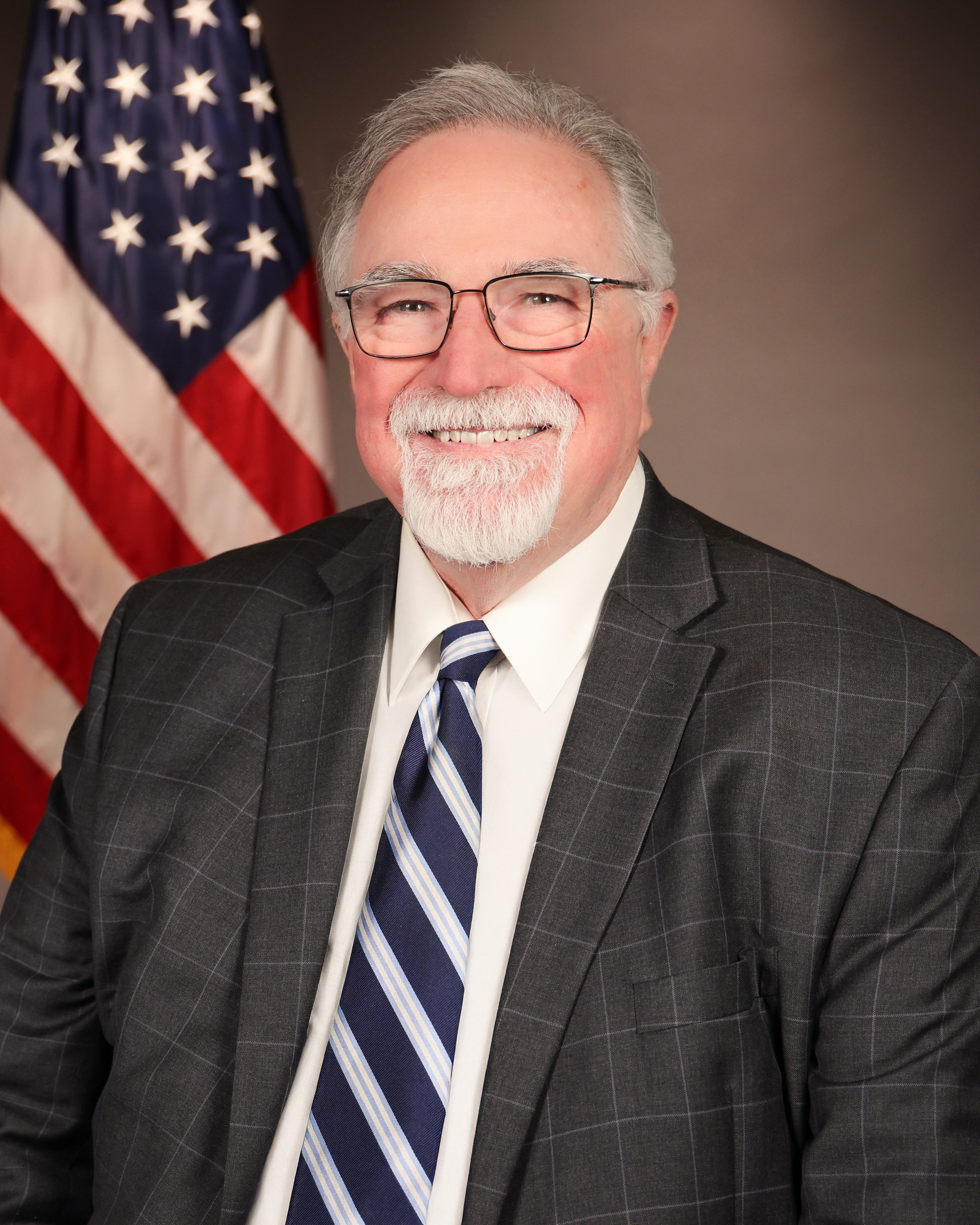
- Incumbent; Thomas March Bell since December 22, 2025
- United States Department of Health and Human Services
- Reports to: Secretary of Health and Human Services
- Appointer: The president with Senate advice and consent
- Term length: No fixed term
- Website: oig.hhs.gov

The Office of Inspector General of the United States Department of Health and Human Services (HHS-OIG) is the internal oversight office for the United States Department of Health and Human Services. It is responsible for oversight of the department's approximately $2.4 trillion portfolio of programs. Approximately 1,650 auditors, investigators, and evaluators, supplemented by staff with expertise in law, technology, cybersecurity, data analytics, statistics, medicine, economics, health policy, and management and administration. Based on Federal Employee Viewpoint Survey scores, OIG has been ranked the best place to work (number 1) in HHS for 5 consecutive years by the Partnership for Public Service.

== Mission ==
Since its 1976 establishment, the mission of the OIG as mandated by the Inspector General Act (Public Law 95-452, as amended), is to protect the integrity of HHS’s programs as well as the well-being of the beneficiaries of those programs.

As appropriate, OIG works with HHS staff and operating divisions, the Department of Justice (DOJ), other executive branch agencies, Congress, States, and private sector representatives to achieve systemic improvements, improved compliance, successful enforcement actions, and recovery of misspent funds. OIG work is conducted in accordance with the Council of the Inspectors General on Integrity and Efficiency (CIGIE) Quality Standards for Inspection and Evaluation, the U.S. Government Accountability Office (GAO) Government Auditing Standards, and the CIGIE Quality Standards for Investigations.

OIG work includes: advanced data analytics and modeling; criminal, civil, and administrative investigations; compliance guidance and education; technical expertise on program integrity issues; cyber security oversight.

OIG holds accountable those who bill HHS programs but do not meet Federal health program requirements or who violate Federal laws regarding the use of Federal health care funds. OIG also identifies opportunities to improve the economy, efficiency, and effectiveness of HHS programs.

OIG reports both to the Secretary of HHS and to the United States Congress about program and management problems and recommendations to correct them. OIG's work is carried out by regional offices nationwide that perform audits, investigations, inspections and other mission-related functions.

The special agents who work for OIG have the same title series "1811" as other federal criminal investigators, such as the FBI, HSI, ATF, DEA and Secret Service. They receive their law enforcement training at the US Department of Homeland Security's Federal Law Enforcement Training Center in Glynco, Georgia. OIG Special Agents have special skills in investigating white collar crime related to Medicare and Medicaid fraud and abuse. Organized crime has dominated the criminal activity relative to this type of fraud.

HHS-OIG investigates tens of millions of dollars in Medicare fraud each year. In addition, OIG will continue its coverage of all 50 states and the District of Columbia by its multi-agency task forces (PSOC Task Forces) that identify, investigate, and prosecute individuals who wilfully avoid payment of their child support obligations under the Child Support Recovery Act.

HHS-OIG agents also provide protective services to the Secretary of HHS, and other department executives as necessary.

== OIG organization ==
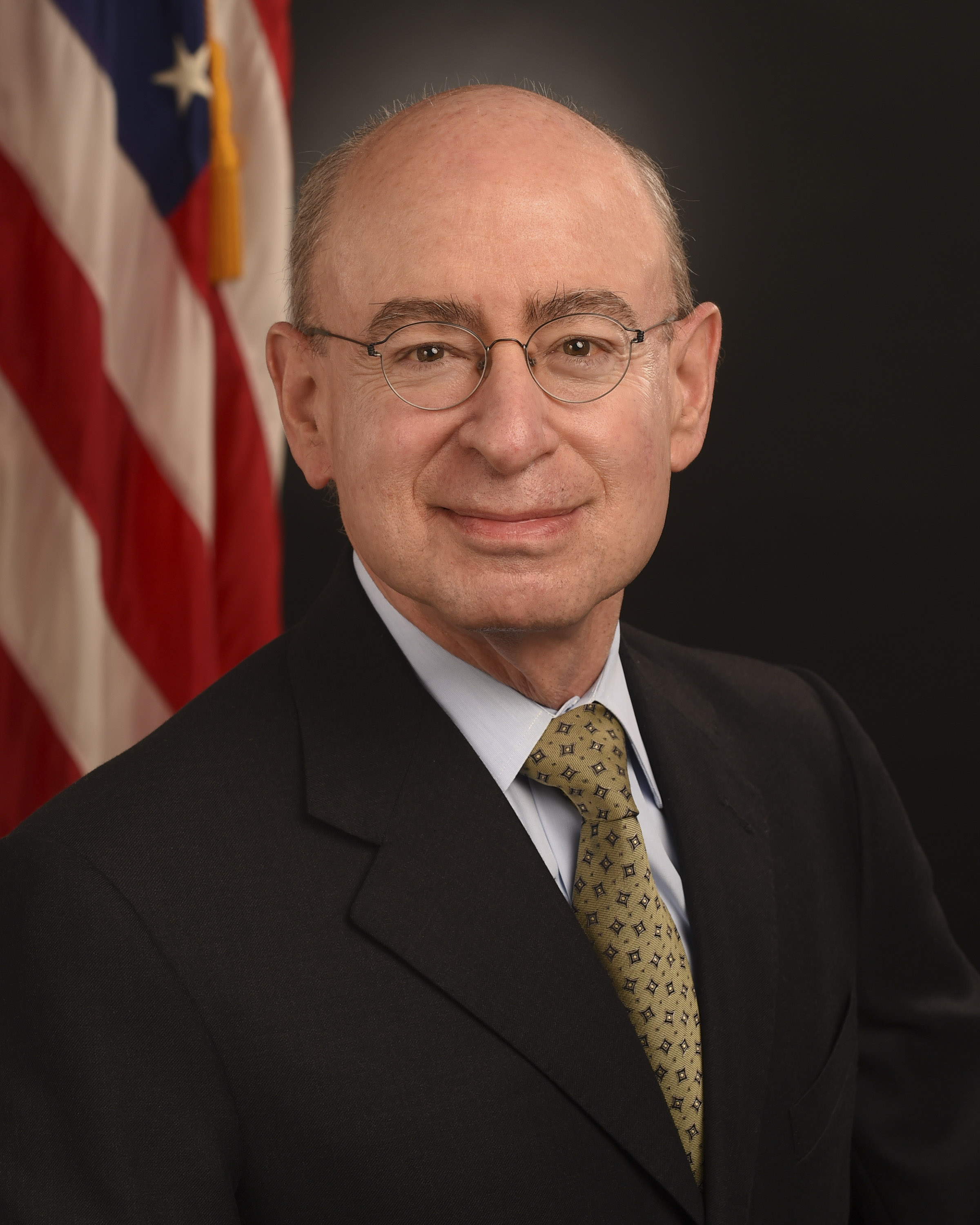
Daniel R. Levinson was the longest-serving HHS Inspector General from 2004 to 2019

The OIG consists of the following components:

Office of Audit Services (OAS). OAS conducts audits that assess HHS programs and operations and examine the performance of HHS programs and grantees. In FY 2020, OIG produced 178 audits. OIG uses data analytics and risk assessments to identify emerging issues and target high-risk areas to ensure the best use of audit resources.

Office of Evaluation and Inspections (OEI). OEI conducts national evaluations to provide HHS, Congress, and the public with timely and reliable information on significant issues. In FY 2020, OIG produced 44 evaluations.

Office of Investigations (OI). OI conducts criminal, civil, and administrative investigations of fraud and misconduct related to HHS programs, operations, and beneficiaries. With investigators working in almost every State, OI coordinates with DOJ and other Federal, State, and local law enforcement authorities. OI also coordinates with OAS and OEI when audits and evaluations uncover potential fraud.

Office of Counsel to the Inspector General (OCIG). OCIG is an in-house, full-service law office, providing legal advice to OIG and compliance guidance to the healthcare industry. OCIG also provides enforcement and compliance measures, working with DOJ on False Claims Act cases and independently on OIG administrative civil monetary penalty and exclusion actions.

Mission Support and Infrastructure (MSI). MSI is composed of the Immediate Office of the Inspector General and the Office of Management and Policy. MSI is responsible for coordinating OIG activities and providing mission support, including setting vision and direction for OIG’s priorities and strategic planning; ensuring effective management of budget, finance, human resource management, and other operations; and serving as a liaison with HHS, Congress, and other stakeholders.

== History ==
With the passage of the Fraud Enforcement and Recovery Act of 2009, and the Affordable Care Act of 2010, the Office of the Inspector General has taken an emboldened stance against healthcare-related non-compliance, most notably for violations of Law and the Anti-Kickback Statute.

In 2015, the OIG issued a fraud alert as a warning to hospitals and healthcare systems to monitor and comply with their physician compensation arrangements.

Recent years have seen dramatic increases in both the number and the amounts of Stark Law violation settlements, prompting healthcare experts to identify a need for automated solutions that manage physician arrangements by centralizing necessary information concerning physician–hospital integration. Contract management software companies such as Meditract provide options for health systems to organize and store physician contracts. Ludi Inc introduced DocTime Log®, an SaaS solution that specifically addresses this growing concern, automating physician time logging in compliance with contract terms to eliminate Stark Law and Anti-Kickback Statute violations.

According to a report released by the OIG in July 2019, more than 80 percent of the 4,563 US hospice centers that provide care to Medicare beneficiaries surveyed from 2012 to 2016 have at least one deficiency and 20 percent have at least one "serious deficiency".

From January 2020, Christi Grimm became the principal deputy inspector general. She assumed the duties of an acting inspector general because the inspector general post was empty. In April 2020, Grimm released a report which surveyed the state of hospitals in late March during the COVID-19 pandemic in the United States. The hospitals reported "severe shortages of testing supplies", "frequently waiting 7 days or longer for test results", which extended the length of patient stays and strained resources, and "widespread shortages of PPE". President Trump called the report "wrong" and questioned Grimm's motives. Later he called the report "Another Fake Dossier!" In May 2020, Trump nominated Jason Weida to be the permanent inspector general, pending confirmation by the US Senate. According to a department spokeswoman, Grimm will remain as principal deputy inspector general.

In January 2025, Grimm was fired by Trump along with sixteen other inspectors general; the legality of the firing is in question.

== List of inspectors general ==
Inspectors general of the U.S. Department of Health and Human Services
Inspectors General	Senate confirmation	Sworn in	Departure
Thomas D. Morris	February 19, 1977		
Richard B. Lowe III (acting)	N/A	September 1, 1979	
Brian B. Mitchell (acting)	N/A	January 1, 1981	
Richard P. Kusserow	June 1, 1981		
Brian B. Mitchell (acting)	N/A	July 1, 1992	
June Gibbs Brown	November 5, 1993		
Michael Mangano (acting)	N/A	January 4, 2001	
Janet Rehnquist	August 8, 2001		June 1, 2003
Dara Corrigan (acting)	N/A	June 2, 2003	
Daniel R. Levinson	June 9, 2005	September 13, 2004 (acting)	May 31, 2019
Joanne Chiedi (acting)	N/A	June 1, 2019	December 31, 2019
Christi Grimm (acting)	N/A	January 1, 2020	February 22, 2022
Christi Grimm	February 17, 2022	February 22, 2022	January 24, 2025
Juliet T. Hodgkins (Acting)	N/A	January 24, 2025	December 22, 2025
Thomas March Bell	December 18, 2025	December 22, 2025	Present
