= Robert Klitgaard =

American academic

Robert Klitgaard is an American academic, former president of Claremont Graduate University and former dean of the Frederick S. Pardee RAND Graduate School, where he was also the Ford Distinguished Professor of International Development and Security. He currently serves as university professor at Claremont Graduate University.

Klitgaard is the author of twelve books, most recently Prevail: How to Face Upheavals and Make Big Choices with the Help of Heroes (2022) and The Culture and Development Manifesto (2021). His books Controlling Corruption (1988) and Tropical Gangsters (1990) contributed to a worldwide movement against corruption.

== Early life ==
Klitgaard received A.B., M.P.P., and Ph.D. degrees from Harvard University.

== Career ==
Klitgaard served as Professor of Economics at the University of Natal (Durban), Lester Crown Professor of Economics at Yale School of Management, and Associate Professor of Public Policy at Harvard's John F. Kennedy School of Government, where he also served half-time as Special Assistant to Harvard's President Derek Bok. He was also dean and professor of international development and security at Frederick S. Pardee RAND Graduate School. From 2005 to 2009, he served as president of Claremont Graduate University.

Klitgaard has been an advisor to many governments on economic strategy and institutional reform, and his consulting work and research have taken him to more than thirty countries in Latin America, Asia, and Africa. He has been called “the world’s leading expert on corruption” (The Christian Science Monitor). He has served on the faculty of the World Economic Forum, the editorial boards of the Journal of Economic Literature and Theoria, and the Board of the International Development Evaluation Association. He has been a consultant to the Asia Foundation, the Asian Development Bank, the Development Bank of Southern Africa, the Interamerican Development Bank, the IMF, the OECD, the Organization of American States, the White House, the United Nations, USAID, the World Bank, and the Rockefeller and Ford Foundations, as well as to many governments around the world.

In 1980 Klitgaard wrote an internal report on the admissions process at Harvard University. It included a statement that standardized test scores were more likely to overestimate the future academic performance of female and minority students, which elicited a negative response from President Derek Bok. In 1985 he published Choosing Elites which discussed the admissions process in higher education and the predictive qualities of high school grades to predict academic performance in college and success later in life. Test scores do the best of the bunch, but he shows how difficult it is to predict “success” however the researcher may define it."

His book Tropical Gangsters is a biographical tale detailing his time spent as an economic advisor in Equatorial Guinea, as well as some surfing on the island of Bioko. It was a bestseller in the US, and is still read by many college students studying African life and politics.

== Personal life ==
Klitgaard met his wife Elaine when, as a visiting professor at the University of Natal, he asked her to assist in installing a math coprocessor. Klitgaard and Elaine have four children.

== Bibliography ==
- The Culture and Development Manifesto (Oxford University Press, 2021). Drawing on examples from around the world, this book describes how to take account of cultural diversity in the reshaping of economic and political development.
- Tropical Gangsters II: Adventures in Development in the World's Poorest Places (Amazon Digital Services, 2013). A set of non-fiction short stories. Stories about corrupt states and cynical cultures, but also about idealism and practical choices that matter.
- High-Performance Government: Structure, Leadership, Incentives (RAND, 2005) (edited with Paul C. Light). How to make government work better through deep reforms.
- Corrupt Cities: A Practical Guide to Cure and Prevention (ICS Press and World Bank Institute, 2000; translated into Indonesian, Chinese, French, Georgian, Romanian, and Spanish) (with Ronald MacLean-Abaroa and H. Lindsey Parris), including examples from around the world.
- Adjusting to Reality: Beyond “State versus Market” in Economic Development (ICS Press and International Center for Economic Growth, 1991; translated into Spanish and French), a study of policies to make markets work better, make governments work better, and close the economic gaps among ethnic groups.
- Tropical Gangsters (Basic Books, 1990; I. B. Tauris, 1991), a first-hand account of economic reform in Africa. Named by the editors of the New York Times Book Review as one of the six best non-fiction books of 1990. Included in New York Times’ Books of the Century.
- Controlling Corruption (University of California Press, 1988; translated into Spanish [2 editions], Portuguese, Russian, Arabic, French, Chinese, and Indonesian), a study of corruption and how to reduce it in developing countries.
- Elitism and Meritocracy in Developing Countries (Johns Hopkins University Press, 1986), a comparative and analytical study of selection policies (including affirmative action) around the globe.
- Data Analysis for Development (Oxford University Press, 1985), how to apply statistics and econometrics to policy problems in poor countries.
- Choosing Elites (Basic Books, 1985), how educational elites are and should be selected in the United States. Listed in The Harvard Guide to Influential Books. Named one of “900 Great Books of the Western World” as compiled in 2000 by Prof. Alexander H. McIntire Jr., of the University of Miami.
