= Christi Grimm =

American government official

Christi A. Grimm
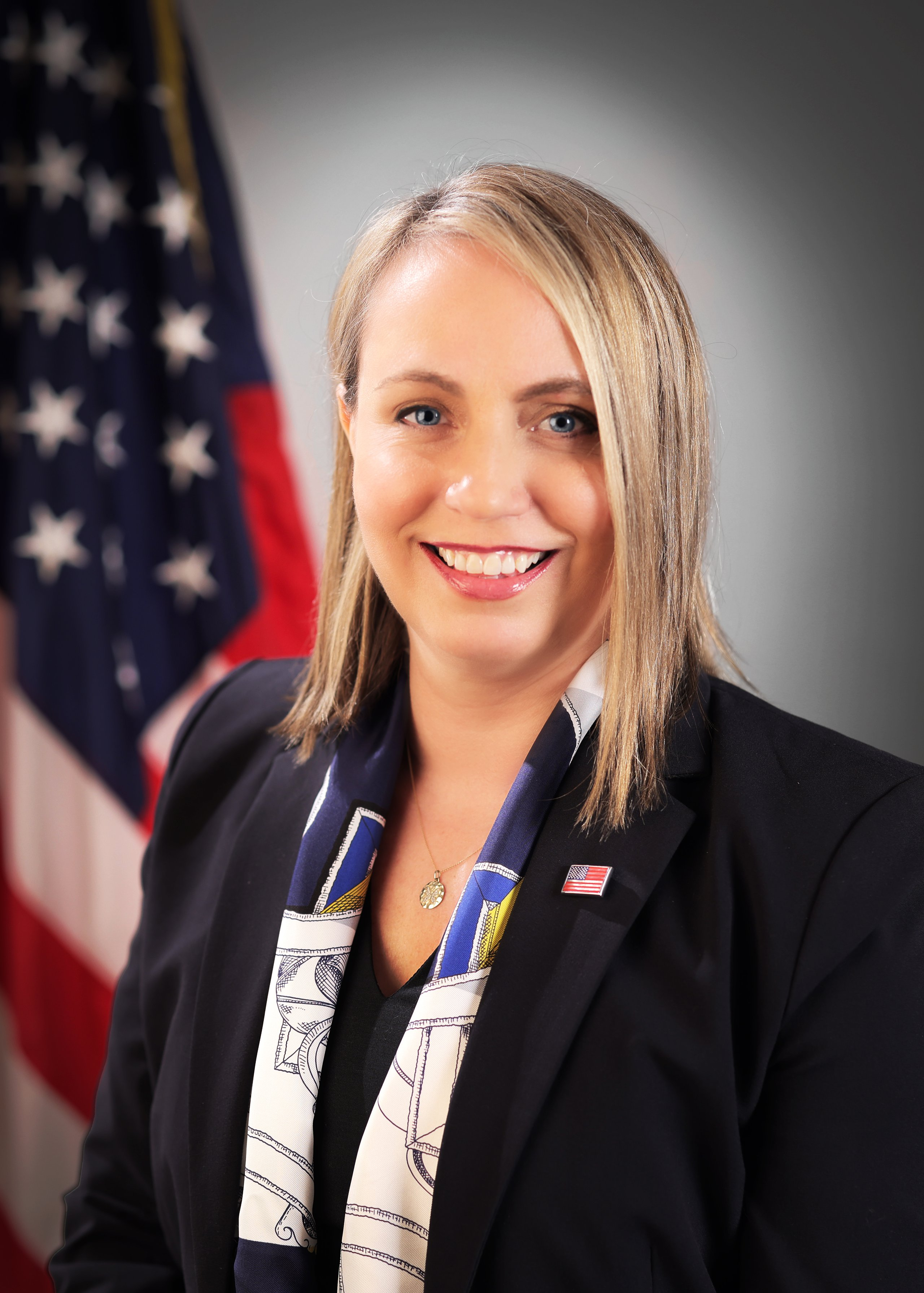

Inspector General of the United States Department of Health and Human Services
- In office February 22, 2022 – January 24, 2025
- President: Joe Biden; Donald Trump
- Preceded by: Daniel R. Levinson (2019)
- Succeeded by: T. March Bell

Personal details
- Education: University of Colorado Denver (BA); New York University (MPA)

Christi Anne Grimm is a former American government official who had served as the Inspector General in the United States Department of Health and Human Services.

== Early life and education ==
Grimm holds a Bachelor of Arts from the University of Colorado, Denver and a Master of Public Administration from New York University. She is also a graduate of the Kennedy School of Senior Managers in Government at Harvard University.

== Career ==
Grimm began her career at the HHS Office of the Inspector General (OIG) in 1999 as an evaluator and later served as a Senior Program Analyst in OIG's Office of Evaluation and Inspections. Grimm was the Chief of Staff and Deputy Inspector General for the Immediate Office of HHS from 2014 to 2019.

=== Principal deputy inspector general ===
Grimm was promoted to the principal deputy inspector general role and began performing the duties of an inspector general in January 2020 after the Acting IG and former PDIG, Joanne Chiedi, retired.

Grimm represented HHS OIG as a statutory member of the Pandemic Response Accountability Committee, created in March 2020 to oversee funds released by the CARES Act and similar legislation. On April 6, 2020, Grimm issued an OIG report surveying the experience of hospitals from March 23 to 27 during the COVID-19 pandemic in the United States. The report conveyed hospitals' experiences of "severe shortages" of COVID-19 testing supplies and "widespread shortages" of medical personal protective equipment, among other challenges. When asked about these findings at a White House Coronavirus Task Force press briefing, President Donald Trump responded, "It's just wrong. Did I hear the word ‘inspector general’? Really? It's wrong. And they'll talk to you about it. It's wrong." He then asked reporters to tell him the name of the HHS IG, "Where did he come from — the inspector general? What's his name? ... No, what's his name? What's his name? ... If you find me his name, I’d appreciate it." Trump subsequently attacked the credibility of Grimm on Twitter on April 7, demanding, "Why didn't the I.G., who spent 8 years with the Obama administration (Did she Report on the failed H1N1 Swine Flu debacle where 17,000 people died?), want to talk to the Admirals, Generals, V.P. & others in charge, before doing her report. Another Fake Dossier!"

On May 1, 2020, President Trump nominated Jason Weida to be the permanent HHS Inspector General to replace Grimm. Grimm continued to serve as Principal Deputy Inspector General performing the duties of the IG pending Weida's confirmation by the Senate. His nomination ultimately stalled, and Grimm continued to serve in this role through the rest of the Trump administration and into the Biden administration.

=== Inspector general ===
On June 18, 2021, President Joe Biden nominated Grimm to serve permanently as Inspector General. Hearings on her nomination were held by the Senate Finance Committee on September 22, 2021. The committee favorably reported her nomination on November 17, 2021; the Senate Homeland Security Committee also reported the nomination favorably on December 9, 2021. Grimm's nomination was confirmed by the entire United States Senate on February 17, 2022. Grimm was sworn in as the sixth Inspector General of the US Department of Health and Human Services (HHS) on February 22, 2022. On January 24, 2025, she was fired by President Donald Trump along with sixteen other inspectors general; however, the legality of the firing remains in question.

== Awards and recognitions ==
Grimm has received the Secretary's Award for Excellence in Management and the Council of the Inspectors General on Integrity and Efficiency Award for Excellence in Management.

== See also ==
- Department of Health and Human Services appointments by Joe Biden
