= Robert Otto Valdez =

American public health official

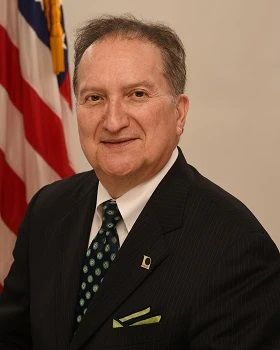

Director of the Agency for Healthcare Research and Quality
- In office February 27, 2022 – January 20, 2025
- President: Joe Biden
- Preceded by: Gopal Khanna
- Succeeded by: TBD

Personal details
- Education: Harvard University (AB, MA); University of Michigan (MHSA); RAND Graduate School (PhD)

Robert Otto Burciaga Valdez is an American academic and public health official who served as the director of the Agency for Healthcare Research and Quality from 2022 to 2025.

== Education ==
Valdez earned a Bachelor of Arts degree and Master of Arts in history and biochemistry from Harvard University, followed by a Master's in Health Services Administration from the University of Michigan and a PhD in policy analysis from the Frederick S. Pardee RAND Graduate School.

== Career ==
Valdez began his career working as a researcher for the RAND Health Insurance Experiment. He later served as a senior advisor to the White House Initiative on Educational Excellence for Hispanics during the Clinton administration. He served as a senior advisor to President Bill Clinton, and as deputy assistant secretary for health, and director of interagency health policy in the United States Department of Health and Human Services. He was the founding dean of the Drexel University School of Public Health before joining the RWJF Center for Health Policy at the University of New Mexico.

In 2021, Valdez was nominated by President Joe Biden to serve as assistant secretary of health and human services for planning and evaluation. His nomination was withdrawn on January 7, 2022. On February 27, 2022, Valdez was instead appointed as the director of the Agency for Healthcare Research and Quality.
