= Susan L. Marquis =

- Born: February 14, 1960 (age 66); Brevard County, Florida
- Education: BA from Rutgers University; MPA and PhD from Princeton School of Public and International Affairs
- Employer: Princeton School of Public and International Affairs
- Title: Charles and Marie Robertson Visiting Professor

Susan L. Marquis is the Charles and Marie Robertson Visiting Professor at the Princeton School of Public and International Affairs. According to her biography on the Princeton University website, “She teaches and writes on new approaches to public policy and policy analysis with the intent of affecting change in our communities through the combined efforts of the government, nonprofit, philanthropic, and private sectors.”

Marquis was previously the Frank and Marcia Carlucci Dean of the Frederick S. Pardee RAND Graduate School. She held this position from January 1, 2009, to September 30, 2021. She was also the vice president for innovation at RAND Corporation from 2012 to 2021. While at RAND, she was also chair of the advisory council for the Princeton School of Public and International Affairs.

Marquis received her Master’s in Public and International Affairs and PhD. from the Princeton School of Public and International Affairs (formerly the Woodrow Wilson School). She served as Assistant Deputy Chief of Naval Operations for Resources, Requirements, and Assessment for the U.S. Navy and also worked for the Office of the Secretary of Defense. Marquis was later vice president and corporate officer at LMI, a not-for-profit government consulting firm. She was a visiting fellow at the University of Cambridge, and a non-resident senior fellow at the Fox Leadership Institution, University of Pennsylvania. She is a member of the Council on Foreign Relations and the Pacific Council on International Policy. Marquis is a founding member of the Board of Directors, Economics of National Security Association and served on the U.S. Navy’s Board of Advisors to the Naval Postgraduate School and the Naval War College.

Since 2014, she has focused research on the Fair Food Program and the Coalition of Immokalee Workers. She is the author of Unconventional Warfare: Rebuilding U.S. Special Operations Forces (1997) and a book on the CIW, I Am Not a Tractor! How Florida Farmworkers Took On the Fast Food Giants and Won, published by Cornell University Press in December 2017. She discussed her book and the CIW at the Aspen Institute in February 2018 and at the L.A Times Festival of Books in April 2018. She has also penned commentaries relating the topic to other current news, such as the #MeToo movement.

Early in her career, Marquis was active in the Washington, D.C, music scene, managing The Slickee Boys, DJing at the original 9:30 Club, and promoting straight-edge punk concerts.
