= Karen Emmons =

American behavioral scientist

- Education: University of Illinois; State University of New York; Warren Alpert Medical School
- Scientific career
- Workplaces: Harvard T.H. Chan School of Public Health
- Thesis: Smoking cessation and change in physiological functioning (1988)

Karen Emmons is an American behavioral scientist who is Professor of Social and Behavioral Science at the Harvard T.H. Chan School of Public Health. Her research uses community based approaches to cancer prevention for underserved communities.

== Early life and education ==
Emmons was an undergraduate at the University of Illinois. She was a doctoral researcher in clinical psychology at the State University of New York, where she studied smoking cessation. She was an intern in behavioral medicine at the Warren Alpert Medical School.

== Research and career ==
Emmons works on cancer prevention in under-resourced communities. She focuses on risk factors for cancer, such as sun exposure, tobacco and second-hand smoke, nutrition and physical activity. She has advocated for increased policy training amongst implementation scientists to eliminate barriers to implementing evidence-based recommendations (e.g. increased screenings for certain cancers). During the COVID-19 pandemic Emmons worked to raise awareness of inhalation hazards.

Alongside her academic research, Emmons has advocated for women in science at Harvard. She was honored for her efforts at the Alice Hamilton Award lecture in 2020.

== Selected publications ==
- Russell E Glasgow; Karen M Emmons (1 January 2007). "How can we increase translation of research into practice? Types of evidence needed". Annual Review of Public Health. 28: 413–433. doi:10.1146/annurev.publhealth.28.021406.144145. ISSN 0163-7525. PMID 17150029. Wikidata Q36675475.
- C. M. McBride; K. M. Emmons; I. M. Lipkus (1 April 2003). "Understanding the potential of teachable moments: the case of smoking cessation" (PDF). Health Education Research. 18 (2): 156–170. doi:10.1093/her/18.2.156. ISSN 0268-1153. PMID 12729175. Wikidata Q48596554.
- Karen M Emmons; Stephen Rollnick (1 January 2001). "Motivational interviewing in health care settings. Opportunities and limitations". American Journal of Preventive Medicine. 20 (1): 68–74. doi:10.1016/s0749-3797(00)00254-3. ISSN 0749-3797. PMID 11137778. Wikidata Q34118132.
