= Emil Heimberger =

American bandleader and violinist

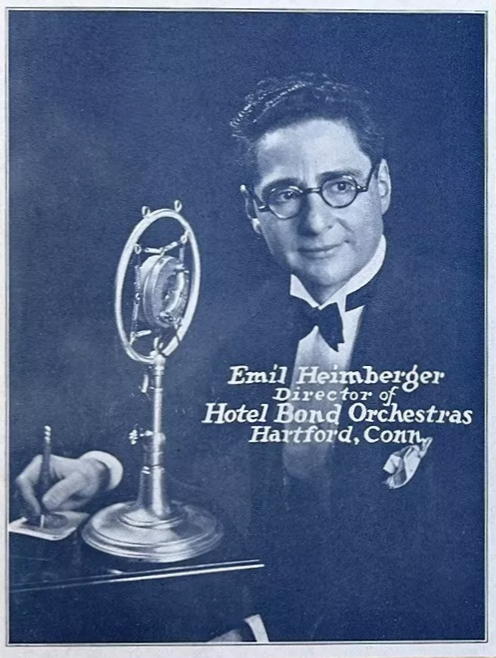
Emil Heimberger with radio mic. portrait circa 1926

Emil Heimberger (July 13, 1889 – 1978) was an American bandleader, violinist and radio personality. He was the leader of the Hotel Bond Orchestras of Hartford, Connecticut from 1922 to 1930, and led the first instrumental ensemble to be broadcast over radio station WTIC. He was a former violinist in the People's Symphony Orchestra led by Franz Xavier Arens, the Russian Symphony Orchestra Society and the New York Symphony Orchestra. He was also a founding member of the Commonwealth Symphony Orchestra of New York City.

== Early life ==
Emil Heimberger was born on July 13, 1889, in New York City, and was raised in the Melrose neighborhood of the Bronx by German-American parents Jacob and Elsie Heimberger. His father, Jacob, was a cigar salesman. Heimberger's early musical training took place in New York, where he was taught by violin instructors Giacomo Quintano and Bernard Sinsheimer. Heimberger was active there as a violinist and private instructor for some time and was second violinist in the Max Jacobs Quartet of New York before 1911.

== Career ==
Before moving to Connecticut, Emil Heimberger was engaged at numerous hotel and classical orchestras in New York City. Heimberger was the musical director of the Ansonia Hotel from 1912 to 1917. In 1915, he played violin in the Russian Symphony Orchestra under guest conductor Sergei Rachmaninoff. He also led various ensembles for high society events, including the weddings of Marjorie A. Vreeland in 1916, and Florence Trumbull in 1929. Between 1917 and 1918, he was the concertmaster and assistant conductor for music during the production of D. W. Griffith's film, Hearts of the World. After World War I, Heimberger led the Shelburne Hotel Orchestra in Atlantic City. He later led ensembles at the Crystal Room of the Ritz-Carlton Hotel, Delmonico's, and was the musical director of the Cascades ballroom and Grill Room of the Hotel Biltmore by 1920.

At the urging of hotelier Harry S. Bond, Heimberger was appointed the director of music for the completed ballroom of the Hotel Bond in Hartford in 1921. The earliest concerts and music arranged by Heimberger for the hotel consisted of primarily Art music, which would later include popular music and jazz by the late 1920s. The opening 1922 program included Meditation from Thais by Jules Massenet, arrangements of "Madama Butterfly" by Puccini, Parade of the Wooden Soldiers by Leon Jessel, The World is Waiting for the Sunrise by Ernest Seitz and By the Waters of Minnetonka by Thurlow Lieurance.

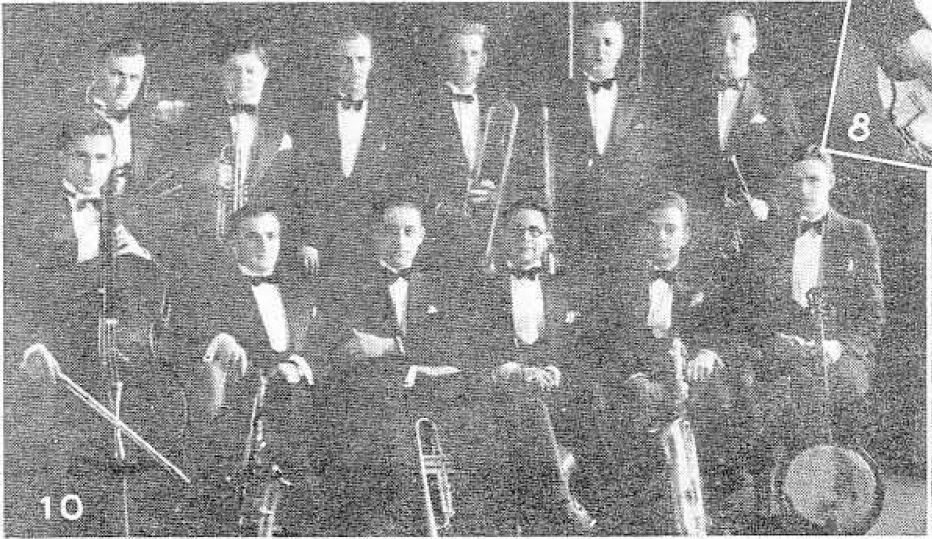
Members of Emil Heimberger's Hotel Bond Orchestra, group portrait circa 1927

Heimberger's Hotel Bond Orchestras included trumpeters Louis I. Perlmutter, Johnny Mendel and Harry Goldfield, percussionists "Buck" Cannon and Hervé "Harvey" Belair, saxophonist Lionel J. Kennedy and banjoist Ray W. Grinold. Heimberger's Bond Trio, which were featured on WTIC radio, included Heimberger on violin, cellist Lee Josseffer and pianist Philip Moss. Later trio members included cellist Sol Rubin and pianist Herbert E. Holtz. Hemberger was succeeded in leading the Bond Trio by Ralph Mixer, a fellow WTIC station orchestra leader.

The Heimberger Trio was well known in Hartford outside of the Hotel Bond, performing at special events such as an Aeolian Company sponsored Duo-Art demonstration of David Pesetzki piano rolls in 1923 with vocalist Edith Aab.

In December 1924, Heimberger's Orchestra appeared alongside Paul Whiteman's Orchestra for an engagement at the Hotel Bond. In 1927, Harry Bond and Emil Hemberger planned an engagement featuring Roger Wolfe Kahn and Julie Wintz's orchestras, after which members of Kahn's ensemble were engaged to play at the hotel indefinitely under the direction of Wintz.

Emil Heimberger led the 1st Company Governor's Foot Guard Band of Connecticut from 1925 to mid-1926. He was succeeded by Hartford bandleader, William B. Tasillo.

== Radio ==
Emil Heimberger was engaged by the newly founded radio station WTIC in 1925 to perform for their first official broadcast. The broadcast took place on February 10, 1925, featuring the Heimberger Trio, followed by a performance by members of the Mendelssohn Glee Club. The trio's performance was broadcast live from the Hotel Bond ballroom. Their first broadcast was heard in many Northeastern states and in Nova Scotia, and was highly acclaimed. Heimberger's latter broadcast performances were heard and received well from listeners in various states and in Canada. Heimberger's ensembles were featured in 1926 for WTIC's first anniversary program and for the final broadcast of the station from the Travelers building in July 1929. Heimberger's trio performed Charles G. Dawes' "Melodie" that same year in one of its first radio performances.

Heimberger's Trio and Hotel Bond Orchestras were regularly broadcast at WTIC from 1925 to 1930, heard nationally from 1926 onward through the National Broadcasting Company Red Network. Heimberger was the host of "The Enchanted Hour" and "Musical Memory" on WTIC. In 1926, Heimberger and his orchestra was noted by The Hartford Courant for accomplishing one of the first synchronized musical performances via radio whereas a live broadcast of an orchestra playing "Lonesome And Sorry" at Colt Park, was faded out and synchronized to Heimberger's ensemble playing the same music through listening on headphones at the Hotel Bond.

== L.A. and later years ==
Emil Heimberger resigned from his positions at WTIC and the Hotel Bond in 1930, removing to Los Angeles with his family that year noting his intention to "enter the synchronization field of music in tone pictures". He resided in the West Adams neighborhood of Los Angeles.

Heimberger continued to perform for radio orchestras throughout the 1930s, including as a violinist for Wilbur Hatch and Lud Gluskin's orchestras on KNX. He was also the assistant musical director of Grauman's Chinese Theatre in 1930. Heimberger largely retired from music by 1942, and was employed by the Plomb Tool Company during WWII. He died in Los Angeles in 1978.
