= Ben Connable =

American scholar

- Education: University of Colorado Boulder; American Military University; Naval Postgraduate School; King's College London
- Occupations: Marine, scholar

Ben Connable is an American retired Marine Major, military strategist and Professor at the Frederick S. Pardee RAND Graduate School in Santa Monica, California.

== Early life ==
Ben Connable graduated from the University of Colorado Boulder in Boulder, Colorado. He received a master's degree in Strategic Intelligence from the American Military University and a master's degree in National Security Affairs from the Naval Postgraduate School in Monterey, California. He also attended the War Studies program at King's College London, where he earned a PhD.

== Career ==
He is a retired Major of the United States Marine Corps, having served in Iraq with the United States Marine Corps. He now serves as Professor at the Frederick S. Pardee RAND Graduate School in Santa Monica, California. He has been published in Foreign Affairs, The Washington Post, CNN, USA Today, etc.

On the United States's defeat of Islamic State of Iraq and the Levant, he has suggested looking at the broader picture, by focusing on a national reconciliation between Sunnis, Shias and Kurds.

== Bibliography ==
- How Insurgencies End (with Martin C. Libicki, RAND Corporation, 2010).
- Military Intelligence Fusion for Complex Operations: A New Paradigm (RAND Corporation, 2012).
- Embracing the Fog of War: Assessment and Metrics in Counterinsurgency (RAND Corporation, 2012).
- Assessing Freedom of Movement for Counterinsurgency Campaigns (RAND Corporation, 2012).
- Leveraging Development Aid to Address Root Causes in Counterinsurgency: Balancing Theory and Practice in"Hold" and "Build". (RAND Corporation, 2013).
- Modeling, Simulation, and Operations Analysis in Afghanistan and Iraq (RAND Corporation, 2014).
- Defeating the Islamic State in Iraq (RAND Corporation, 2014).
- The Future of the Iraqi Popular Mobilization Forces (with Daniel Egel, Trevor Johnston, RAND Corporation, 2023)
