= Daniel R. Levinson =

American lawyer (born 1949)

Daniel Levinson
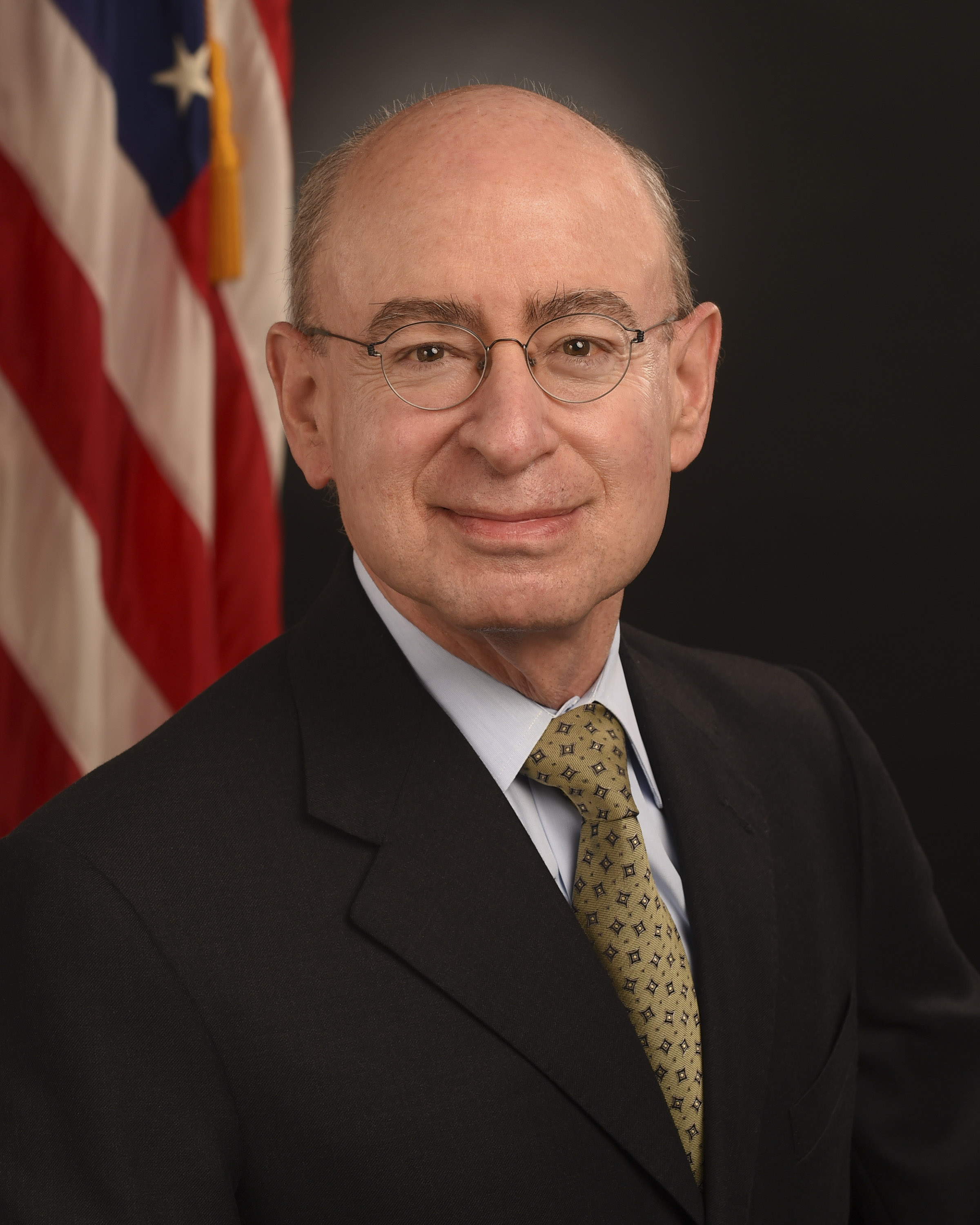

Inspector General of the Department of Health and Human Services
- In office September 13, 2004 – May 31, 2019; Acting: September 13, 2004 – June 9, 2005
- President: George W. Bush; Barack Obama; Donald Trump
- Preceded by: Dara Corrigan (Acting)
- Succeeded by: Christi Grimm (2022)

Inspector General of the General Services Administration
- In office August 9, 2001 – June 9, 2005
- President: George W. Bush
- Preceded by: Joel Gallay (Acting)
- Succeeded by: Brian Miller

Personal details
- Born: Daniel Ronald Levinson; March 24, 1949 (age 77) New York City, New York, U.S.
- Education: University of Southern California (BA); Georgetown University (JD); George Washington University (LLM)

Daniel Ronald Levinson is an American attorney who served as Inspector General for the U.S. Department of Health and Human Services (HHS) from September 8, 2004, to May 31, 2019. HHS is among the largest departments in the federal government, encompassing Medicare, Medicaid, public health, medical research, food and drug safety, welfare, child and family services, disease prevention, Indian health, and mental health services. It also exercises leadership responsibilities in public health emergency preparedness and combating bio-terrorism.

== Early life and education ==
Levinson was born on March 24, 1949, in New York City. Levinson earned an A.B. from the University of Southern California, where he was a member of Tau Kappa Epsilon fraternity, and a Juris Doctor from the Georgetown University Law Center. He then earned a LL.M from George Washington University Law School. He is a member of the American Bar Association, the American Evaluation Association and the Association of Certified Fraud Examiners.

== Career ==
Prior to his appointment at HHS, he served for four years as Inspector General of the U. S. General Services Administration, where he oversaw the integrity of the federal civilian procurement process. He earlier served a seven-year term as Chairman of the United States Merit Systems Protection Board, where he oversaw the integrity of the federal civilian personnel system and adjudicated a wide range of personnel appeals pursuant to the Civil Service Reform Act. He is also a former General Counsel of the U.S. Consumer Product Safety Commission.

As Inspector General, Levinson was the senior official responsible for audits, evaluations, investigations, and law enforcement efforts, relating to HHS programs and operations. He managed an independent and objective nationwide organization of over 1500 professional staff members dedicated to promoting economy, efficiency, and effectiveness in HHS programs and addressing fraud, waste, and abuse.

Levinson served on the Executive Council of the Council of Inspectors General on Integrity and Efficiency, where he chaired the Committee on Inspection and Evaluation. He also was a member of the Recovery Accountability and Transparency Board. He previously served as Editor-in-Chief of The Journal of Public Inquiry. Earlier in his career, he was a Government Member of the Administrative Conference of the United States.

In April, 2019, Levinson announced his retirement. On May 31, 2019, Levinson left his position at HHS. Principal Deputy Inspector General Joanne Chiedi, who had worked alongside Levinson for nine years, was appointed acting inspector general on June 1, 2019. In January 2020, Christi Grimm became the Principal Deputy Inspector General of the Department of Health and Human Services (HHS).
