= Karen Winkfield =

American oncologist and physician-scientist (born 1970)

- Born: 1970 (age 55–56)
- Education: Binghamton University; Duke University School of Medicine
- Scientific career
- Fields: Radiation oncology, health equity
- Workplaces: Atrium Health Wake Forest Baptist; Vanderbilt University
- Website: drkarenwinkfield.com

Karen Marie Winkfield (born 1970) is an American radiation oncologist, physician-scientist, and implementation scientist. She is the Ingram Professor of Cancer Research at Vanderbilt University School of Medicine.

== Early life and education ==
Winkfield was born in 1970 to a family of Jehovah's Witnesses who were opposed to formal education.

Winkfield completed a B.S. in biochemistry at Binghamton University. She earned a Ph.D. (2004) in pathology and M.D. (2005) from Duke University School of Medicine. Winkfield was the second black woman to complete the medical scientist training program at Duke University. She completed a radiation oncology residency at Harvard University.

== Career ==
Winfield was an associate director for community outreach and engagement and director of the office of cancer health equity at Atrium Health Wake Forest Baptist. In 2020, Winkfield joined Vanderbilt University. She is the executive director of the Meharry-Vanderbilt Alliance, Ingram Professor of Cancer Research, and a professor of radiation oncology at Vanderbilt University Medical Center.

Winkfield is the cofounder and director of the Association of Black Radiation Oncologists. She is an implementation scientist focused on using her experience with community engagement to improve health equity. Winkfield co-leads the Inclusive Participation Workgroup of the NIH CEAL teams against COVID-19 disparities.

In September 2021, Winkfield was appointed by U.S. president Joe Biden to a six-year term on the National Cancer Advisory Board. She was also recognized as one of the 100 Influential Women in Oncology by OncoDaily.

== Personal life ==
Winkfield was married to Jeffrey Walker. Walker was diagnosed with type 2 diabetes in 2003 and died in 2018 from complications of the disease. His medical journey influenced Winkfield to pursue patient advocacy.

== See also ==
- List of African-American women in medicine
