= Anti-Kickback Statute =

US federal law

The Anti-Kickback Statute (AKS) is an American federal law prohibiting financial payments or incentives for referring patients or generating federal healthcare business. The law, codified at 42 U.S. Code § 1320a–7b(b), imposes criminal and, particularly in association with the federal False Claims Act, civil liability on those who knowingly and willfully offer, solicit, receive, or pay any form of remuneration in exchange for the referral of services or products covered by any federal healthcare program (e.g., the referral of a Medicare patient for an MRI), subject to certain narrow exceptions. In other words, the statute covers both those who provide (or offer) kickbacks and those who receive (or solicit) kickbacks. The statute is among the most important healthcare fraud and abuse laws in the United States. Violation of the AKS is a felony.

The AKS was "enacted to ensure that clinical decisions and medical services are provided to patients based on their medical needs and not on the improper financial considerations of providers". The illegal remuneration covered by the AKS includes "anything of value" and is therefore not limited to cash. Thus, the sorts remuneration barred by the AKS may be, for example, in the form of consulting fees, gifts (e.g., sports tickets), discounted rent, research grants, and bonuses. The AKS is a separate law from the Stark Law; however, the AKS may, in many instances, cover conduct within the scope of the Stark Law (and vice versa).

A claim made to the federal government (e.g., a claim to Medicare for a patient visit) that results from a violation of the Anti-Kickback Statute is, by its by nature, a "false claim" under the False Claims Act and thus may result in liability under the False Claims Act (including the False Claims Act's treble damages and civil monetary penalty provisions). Given this interplay between the AKS and the False Claims Act, violations of the AKS have formed the basis of a great number of high value civil recoveries in favor of the federal government (and whistleblowers) under the False Claims Act.
