= Nilofer Azad =

American oncologist and physician-scientist

Nilofer Saba Azad
- Education: Baylor College of Medicine
- Scientific career
- Fields: Oncology
- Workplaces: Johns Hopkins University

Nilofer Saba Azad is an American oncologist and physician-scientist specialized in the development of novel therapies for gastrointestinal cancers. She is a professor at the Johns Hopkins School of Medicine and a member of the Sidney Kimmel Comprehensive Cancer Center (SKCCC), where she directs several clinical research programs.

== Education and Career ==
Azad earned a M.D. at Baylor College of Medicine in 2001. She completed a residency in internal medicine at Baylor in 2004, followed by a fellowship in medical oncology and hematology at the National Cancer Institute (NCI) in 2008. After completing her training, Dr. Azad joined the Sidney Kimmel Comprehensive Cancer Center (SKCCC) at Johns Hopkins School of Medicine, where she is currently a professor of oncology. She serves as co-director of the Developmental Therapeutics Clinical Research Program and the Cancer Genetic and Epigenetic Core Research Program at SKCCC.

== Research ==
Azad’s research centers on the clinical development of new treatments for gastrointestinal malignancies, including colorectal, pancreatic, and biliary tract cancers. She leads and participates in early-phase clinical trials investigating epigenetic therapy, immunotherapies, and other targeted approaches. Her work includes studies of KRAS-directed immunotherapy in collaboration with Dr. Elizabeth Jaffee.

== Honors ==
Azad is a member of the Stand Up To Cancer (SU2C) Epigenetics Dream Team and a Principal Investigator on the SU2C Colon Cancer Dream Team. She has held leadership roles in national and international cancer research organizations and has served on scientific advisory boards and review committees.

In September 2021, Azad was appointed by U.S. president Joe Biden to serve on the NCI National Cancer Advisory Board, which provides guidance to the National Cancer Institute.
