= Christopher Friese =

American scientist (born 1975)

Christopher R. Friese
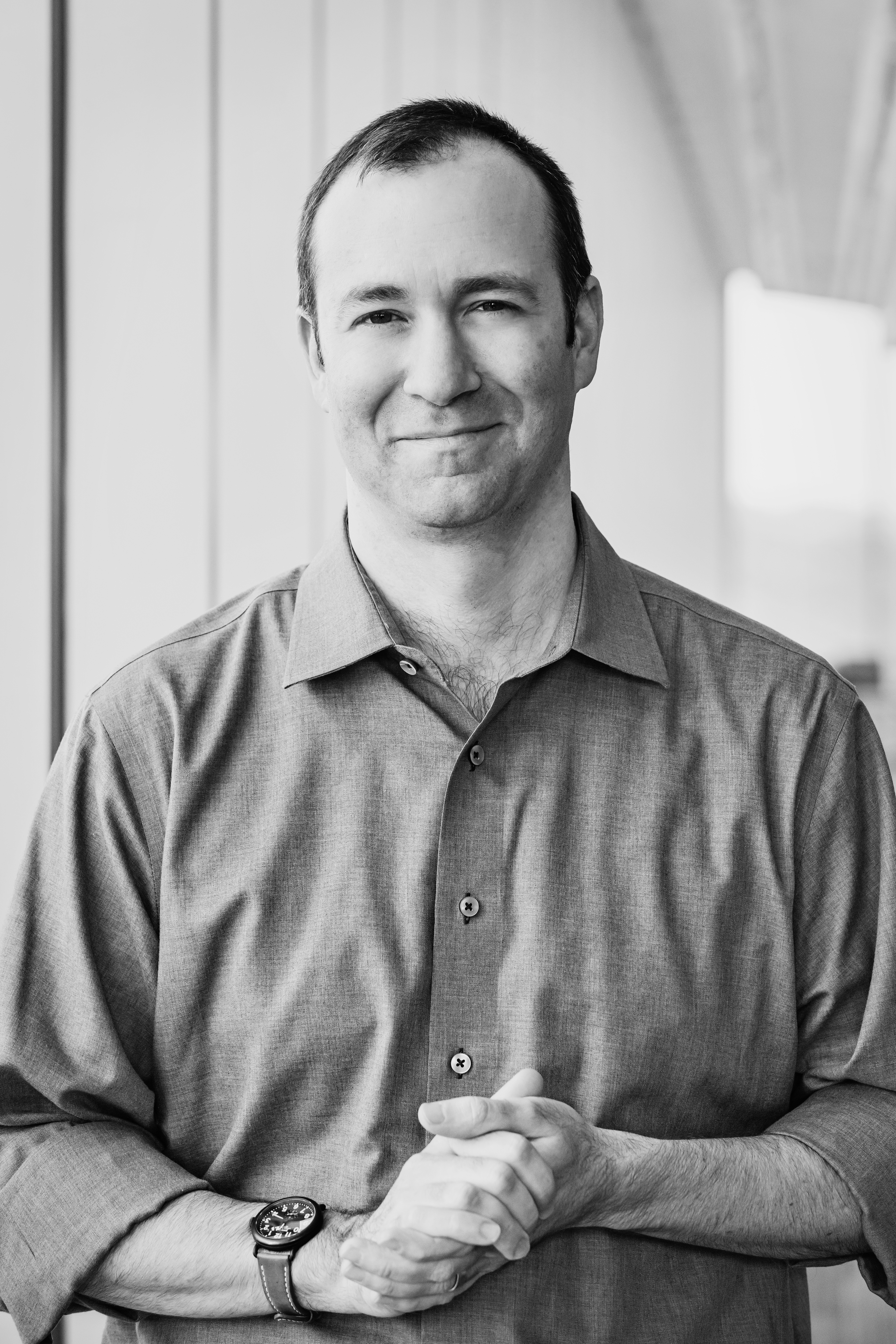
- Born: 1975 (age 50–51); Bridgeport, Connecticut

Academic background
- Education: University of Pennsylvania (Ph.D. 2005, M.S. 2001, B.S.N. 1997)
- Thesis: Hospital nursing organization and outcomes for surgical oncology patients (2005)

Academic work
- Institutions: University of Michigan (2008–)

Christopher Ryan Friese (born 1975) is an American nurse scientist, the Elizabeth Tone Hosmer Professor of Nursing, and Vice Provost for Academic and Faculty Affairs at the University of Michigan. In 2020, he was elected to membership in the National Academy of Medicine and in 2021, was appointed to the National Cancer Advisory Board.

== Early life and education ==
Born and raised in Connecticut, Friese graduated from Fairfield College Preparatory School. Friese completed his Bachelor of Nursing, Master's degree, and PhD from the University of Pennsylvania in Philadelphia, mentored by Linda Aiken. Following this, Friese worked as a staff nurse on the leukemia intensive care unit at Johns Hopkins Hospital and completed a 3-year postdoctoral fellowship at the Dana–Farber Cancer Institute and Harvard University. Upon completing his fellowship, Friese received a Young Investigator award from the Multinational Association of Supportive Care in Cancer in 2005 and a Merit Award from the American Society of Clinical Oncology in 2006.

== Career ==
Friese was recruited to join the faculty at the University of Michigan's School of Nursing in 2008. As an assistant professor, he became the first nurse scientist to receive a Pathway to Independence K99/R00 research grant to study outcomes of care for patients with cancer from the National Institute of Nursing Research. Friese also wrote a research paper which was cited by the IOM Future of Nursing 2008 report in their recommendation to increase the proportion of registered nurses who hold a BSN. He was part of a national research team to study breast cancer treatment decisions in 2012 and as a member of the Governing Board of the Patient-Centered Outcomes Research Institute in 2018. From 2016 to 2017, with support from a grant from the Robert Wood Johnson Foundation, Friese completed a one-year health policy fellowship at the National Academy of Medicine and the Office of United States Senator Robert P. Casey, Jr.

In 2017, Friese was appointed the inaugural Elizabeth Tone Hosmer Professor of Nursing. During the COVID-19 pandemic, Friese and colleague Bhramar Mukherjee were named the new associate directors for cancer control and population sciences and cancer data sciences, respectively, at the Rogel Cancer Center. As the pandemic grew across the world, he participated in the Utilization of COVID-19 treatments and clinical outcomes among patients with cancer: A COVID-19 and Cancer Consortium (CCC19) cohort study. Friese also published findings of another study which highlighted the need to improve reporting and training, and for additional research into the underlying causes of hazardous spills. In October 2020, Friese was elected to membership in the National Academy of Medicine. In 2021, the Oncology Nursing Society named Friese as the recipient of the organization's distinguished researcher award. President Biden appointed Friese to a six-year term on the National Cancer Advisory Board, which advises the federal government on national cancer research policy. In 2022, Friese was inducted into the Sigma Theta Tau International Nurse Researcher Hall of Fame. Friese assumed the role of Vice Provost for Academic and Faculty Affairs at the University of Michigan on June 1, 2024, while also maintaining his faculty appointment.
