= RAND School of Public Policy =

Private graduate school in the US

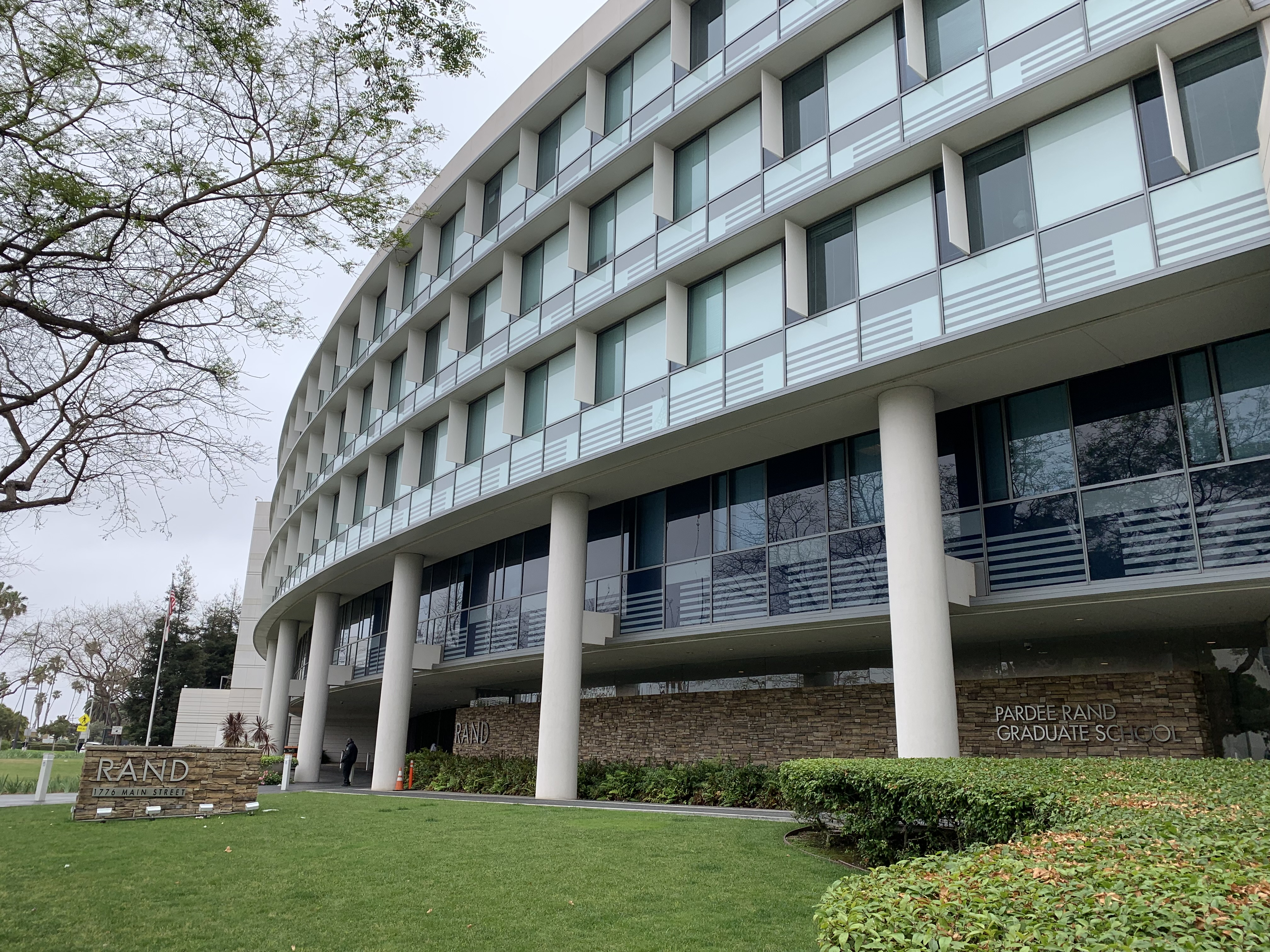
- Former names: RAND Graduate Institute (1970–1987); RAND Graduate School (1987–2004); Frederick S. Pardee RAND Graduate School (2004–2025)
- Motto: Be the Answer
- Type: Private graduate school
- Established: 1970; 56 years ago
- Accreditation: WSCUC
- Affiliations: RAND Corporation
- Endowment: $313.05 million (2024)
- Dean: Nancy Staudt
- Academic staff: 5
- Postgraduates: 126
- Location: Santa Monica, California, United States; 34°0′35″N 118°29′27″W
- Campus: Small city
- Colors: Purple and gold
- Website: www.rand.edu

The RAND School of Public Policy (formerly the Frederick S. Pardee RAND Graduate School) is a private graduate school associated with the RAND Corporation in Santa Monica, California, and Arlington, Virginia. The school offers doctoral studies in policy analysis and practical experience working on RAND research projects to solve current public policy problems. Its campus is co-located with the RAND Corporation and most of the faculty is drawn from the 950 researchers at RAND.

== History ==
The school was founded in 1970 as the RAND Graduate Institute (RGI). The name of the school has been changed twice. In 1987, RGI became the RAND Graduate School. In 2004, the school's name was changed to honor the contributions of Frederick S. Pardee, a former RAND researcher and philanthropist. Charles Wolf Jr. served as founding dean from 1970 to 1997 and remained a professor at the school until his death in 2016.

In 2013, the RAND School launched the Pardee Initiative for Global Human Progress focusing on international development. The John and Carol Cazier Environmental and Energy Sustainability Initiative was started in 2014. The RAND School has developed partnerships with UCLA.

RAND graduate students voted to unionize in 2023, and have been bargaining a contract since then. Following approval to offer the Master of Technology Policy and to offer all programs on the Washington campus, the school was renamed to the RAND School of Public Policy.

== Academics ==
The RAND School of Public Policy offers the Doctor of Philosophy (Ph.D.) degree in policy analysis. The Master of Philosophy (M.Phil.) degree is awarded to students after two years of coursework and partial completion of the Ph.D. requirements. The first doctorate was awarded in 1974. As of August 2018, the RAND School has awarded 400 Ph.D. degrees and is the largest policy Ph.D. program in the United States.

The curriculum includes courses in economics, statistics, operations research, political science, and the behavioral and social sciences. Public policy courses focus on issues such as social determinants of health, education, civil and criminal justice, national security, population and demographics, and international development.

Separate from the Ph.D. and M.Phil programs, the RAND School offers three additional graduate programs:

- Master of Policy Analysis
- Master of National Security Policy
- Master of Technology Policy

== On-the-job training ==
RAND graduate students gain practical experience and earn their fellowships through on-the-job training as members of RAND's interdisciplinary research teams, initially as apprentices and later in roles of increasing responsibility and independence. Students can apply to work on current projects with clients in the public, private, and non-profit sectors. RAND's research areas include children and families, education and the arts, energy and environment, health and health care, infrastructure and transportation, international affairs, law and business, national security, population and aging, public safety, science and technology, and terrorism and homeland security.

RAND argued in 2023 that students aren't employees under the National Labor Relations Act. However, they also argued that students were indistinguishable from other employees. The National Labor Relations Board disagreed with both arguments, stating that "Students have significant functional integration with the Employer’s research staff... students actively contribute to the research that underlies the Employer’s analysis and the presentation of this analysis to clients."

== Accreditation ==
The RAND School is accredited by the Western Association of Schools and Colleges (WASC). The school received its first accreditation in 1975 and was reaccredited in 2021 for 10 years (until 2030).

== Noted people ==
=== Deans ===
- Charles Wolf Jr. (1970–1998)
- Robert Klitgaard (1998–2005)
- Rae Archibald (2005–2006, interim dean)
- John Graham (2006–2008)
- Molly Selvin (2008, interim dean)
- Susan L. Marquis (2009–2021)
- Nancy Staudt (2021–present)

=== Notable alumni ===
- Mark Albrecht – Former executive secretary of the National Space Council, former president, Lockheed Martin International Launch Services
- Tatiana Andreyeva - Associate Professor in the Department of Agricultural and Resource Economics and Director of economic initiatives at the University of Connecticut Rudd Center for Food Policy and Health
- Yilmaz Arguden – Founder and chair, ARGE Consulting; founder, Argüden Governance Academy
- Bruce Bennett - International/Defense Researcher, RAND Corporation Professor, Pardee RAND Graduate School, and noted authority on North Korea.
- Gordon Bitko – Executive vice president of policy, Information Technology Industry Council (ITIC) Former Chief Information Officer, United States Federal Bureau of Investigation
- Arthur C. Brooks – President Emeritus, American Enterprise Institute. William Henry Bloomberg Professor of the Practice of Public Leadership, Harvard Kennedy School.
- Matthew Dixon – Director, Joint Reserve Directorate, Office of the Under Secretary of Defense for Research and Engineering.
- Richard Fallon – Former Senior Vice-President and Chief Financial Officer, RAND Corporation
- Myong-Hyun Go - Senior Research Fellow at the Asan Institute for Policy Studies in Seoul, Korea. Adjunct Professor at the Korea University School of Cybersecurity.
- Jay Griffin – Former chair, Hawaii Public Utilities Commission.
- Jeremy Ghez - Associate Professor of Economics and International Affairs, HEC Paris. Academic director of the HEC Paris Center for Geopolitics.
- Yong Sup Han – Former vice president and director of the Korea National Defense University (KNDU)
- Angela Hawken – Professor of public policy at the Marron Institute of Urban Management at New York University
- Owen Hill – Former legislator, Colorado State Senate
- Yong Sup Han – Former vice president and director of the Korea National Defense University (KNDU)
- Xiaoyan (Shawn) Li, group director, Worldwide Health Economics and Outcomes Research, Bristol-Myers Squibb
- Elizabeth McGlynn - Vice President for Kaiser Permanente Research and Executive Director Kaiser Permanente Center for Effectiveness and Safety Research (CESR):
- Silvia Montoya - Director, UNESCO Institute for Statistics
- Arnab Mukherjee - Professor, Center for Public Policy, Indian Institute of Management Bangalore, Founding Program Director, Mahatma Gandhi National Fellowship Program
- Joseph Nation – former legislator, California State Assembly, professor of the Practice of Public Policy at Stanford University.
- Athar Osama – founder and CEO, Pakistan Innovation Foundation
- Scott Pace – Executive Secretary of the National Space Council, former director of the Space Policy Institute at the Elliott School of International Affairs at George Washington University
- Jeffrey Peterson – Chair for the Study of Officership, Simon Center for the Professional Military Ethic, United States Military Academy.
- Samantha Ravitch - Chairman of the Foundation for Defense of Democracies’ Center on Cyber and Technology Innovation and its Transformative Cyber Innovation Law, National Security Institute, George Mason University.
- Jack Riley -Vice president and director, Homeland Security Research Division (HSRD) RAND Corporation.
- Philip Romero – Former Dean and Professor of Finance, Charles H. Lundquist College of Business, University of Oregon, Former Dean, College of Business and Economics, California State University Los Angeles, Chief Economist and Deputy Cabinet Secretary for former California Gov. Pete Wilson
- Mark Schuster - Founding Dean and CEO, Kaiser Permanente Bernard J. Tyson School of Medicine
- Neeraj Sood - Professor and vice dean for Faculty Affairs & Research at the USC Price School of Public Policy, founding member of the USC Schaeffer Center, a National Associate of the National Academies of Sciences, Engineering, and Medicine, and an editorial board member of the Journal of Health Economics, Journal of Policy Analysis and Management, and Health Services Research.
- Connor Spreng – Former Senior Economist, World Bank
- Kenneth E. Thorpe - Robert W. Woodruff Professor and Chair of the Department of Health Policy and Management, Emory University former Deputy Assistant Secretary for Health Policy in the United States Department of Health and Human Services from 1993 to 1995.
- Anna-Marie Vilamovska – Former Secretary for Innovation Policy, Republic of Bulgaria. Awarded the Commander Cross of the Order of Merit of the Republic of Poland for outstanding contributions to the development of Polish-Bulgarian cooperation.
- Robert Otto Valdez - Director of the Agency for Healthcare Research and Quality and Robert Wood Johnson Foundation Professor Emeritus of Family & Community Medicine and Economics at the University of New Mexico.
- Zhen Wang - Professor of Health Services Research, Mayo Clinic
- Casey Wardynski - Former Assistant Secretary of the Army (Manpower and Reserve Affairs).
- C. Jason Wang - Professor of Pediatrics and Health Policy, director of the Center for Policy, Outcomes, and Prevention, Stanford University.
- Jeffrey Wasserman – Former vice-president and director of RAND Health, RAND Corporation
