= Soldier's heart =

Soldier's heart may refer to:

== Media ==
- "Soldier's Heart" (song), a 2003 song by R. Kelly
- Soldier's Heart (novel), a 1998 historical novella by Gary Paulsen
- Soldier's Heart (play), a Canadian play by David French
- Soldier's Heart (Ames novel), a 1996 novel by John Edward Ames
- Soldier's Heart: The Campaign to Understand My WWII Veteran Father: A Daughter's Memoir, a 2015 graphic novel by Carol Tyler
- "Soldier's Heart", an episode of the New Amsterdam TV series

== Health ==
- Da Costa's syndrome, several distinct disorders that were historically known collectively as soldier's heart
- Postural orthostatic tachycardia syndrome (POTS) and other related forms of dysautonomia; still in use in some areas
- Posttraumatic stress disorder, historically known as soldier's heart in veterans of the American Civil War
