= Stanton N. Smullens =

American vascular surgeon

Stanton N. Smullens MD, FACS
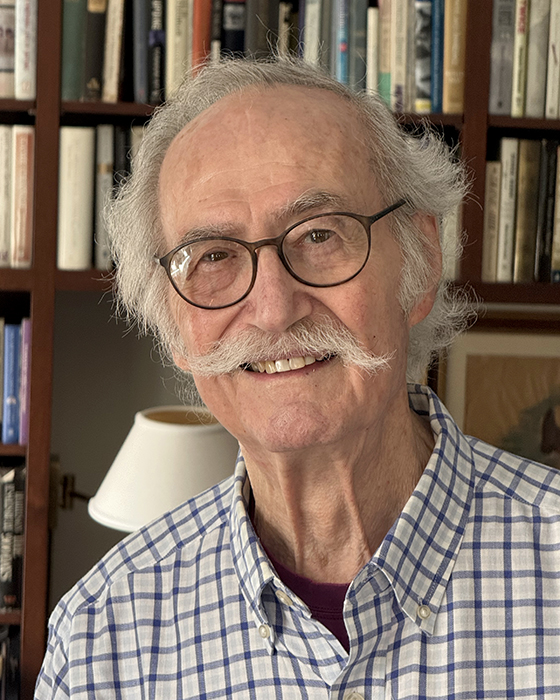
- Smullens in 2026
- Born: Stanton N. Smullens
- Education: Harvard College (AB); Jefferson Medical College (MD)
- Occupations: Vascular surgeon; medical executive; academic
- Known for: Founding CEO of JeffCare; chairmanship of the Pennsylvania Patient Safety Authority

Stanton N. Smullens is an American vascular surgeon, medical executive, and academic. He practiced surgery at Thomas Jefferson University Hospital in Philadelphia for nearly three decades and later held senior administrative roles in the Jefferson Health System, where he served as chief medical officer. He was the founding president and chief executive officer of JeffCare, the physician hospital organization of Thomas Jefferson University, and chaired the Pennsylvania Patient Safety Authority.

== Early life and education ==
Smullens received an Artium Baccalaureus degree from Harvard College in 1957 and earned his Doctor of Medicine from Jefferson Medical College (now Sidney Kimmel Medical College at Thomas Jefferson University) in 1961, where he was elected to Alpha Omega Alpha.

He completed a rotating internship at the Presbyterian Hospital of the University of Pennsylvania from 1961 to 1962. From 1962 to 1964 he served as a captain in the U.S. Army Medical Corps. Returning to Philadelphia, he completed general surgical residencies at Jefferson and at Pennsylvania Hospital between 1964 and 1968, followed by a fellowship in cardiovascular surgery at Jefferson, where he was an American Cancer Society trainee in cardiovascular surgery of the National Heart Institute, from 1968 to 1969. He is board certified in general, thoracic, and vascular surgery.

== Surgical career ==
Smullens practiced surgery at Thomas Jefferson University Hospital from 1969 until 1997. Earlier in his career he was a member of a cardiovascular and thoracic surgery group at Jefferson alongside John Y. Templeton III and Benjamin Bacharach. Over the course of his career his work focused increasingly on vascular surgery.

He held a long faculty appointment at Jefferson Medical College, rising to clinical professor of surgery, and in June 2023 was named an emeritus professor of surgery by the board of Thomas Jefferson University. He published widely in the medical literature on cardiac, vascular, and surgical topics, including the surgical management of acute myocardial infarction, carotid surgery, and outcomes following sympathectomy.

== Health-system leadership ==
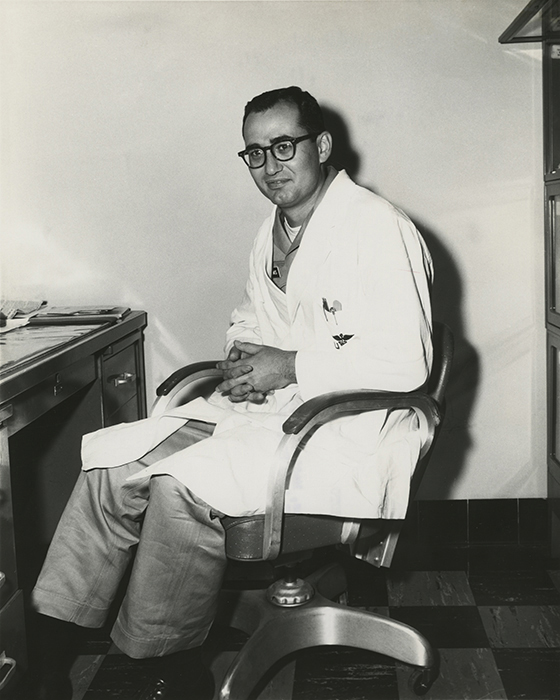
Smullens in 1962

In 1996 Smullens founded JeffCare, the physician hospital organization of Thomas Jefferson University Hospital, and served as its president and chief executive officer until 2004. Under his leadership the organization grew to include several hundred physicians from Philadelphia and southern New Jersey and became a component of the Jefferson Health System.

Smullens served as chief medical officer of the Jefferson Health System for about fifteen years, stepping down in 2014. During his tenure the system was named one of the top 15 health systems in the United States by Thomson Reuters. After the Jefferson Health System was dissolved, he became chief medical officer of the Delaware Valley Accountable Care Organization (DVACO), jointly owned by Jefferson Health and Main Line Health, from 2013 to 2015, and then medical director of network performance and quality until January 2016. He has served on the DVACO board of directors since 2019. He is also a lecturer at the Jefferson College of Population Health, where he has taught courses in healthcare quality and patient safety. He also serves on the advisory board of the Health Law Program at Drexel University's Thomas R. Kline School of Law.

== Patient safety ==
Following the 1999 publication of the Institute of Medicine report To Err Is Human, Smullens testified on medical errors before a subcommittee of the U.S. Senate Committee on Appropriations, chaired by Senator Arlen Specter, at a hearing held on January 25, 2000, appearing as chief medical officer of the Jefferson Health System.

In 2002 he was appointed by Governor Mark Schweiker to the eleven-member Pennsylvania Patient Safety Authority board, established under the Medical Care Availability and Reduction of Error (Mcare) Act. He was elected vice chairman that year and completed his initial term in 2004. He was reappointed in 2005, served as acting chair from 2011 to 2013, and was appointed chairman by Governor Tom Wolf in 2018. His service on the authority ended in 2021.

== Awards and honors ==
Smullens received the Leon A. Peris Memorial Award from Jefferson for clinical teaching and patient care, and in 2019 was named an Influencer of Healthcare for Excellence in Patient Care by The Philadelphia Inquirer. He has served as president of the medical staff of Thomas Jefferson University Hospital and as president of the Jefferson Alumni Association. A portrait of Smullens has been presented to the university.

== Selected publications ==
- Smullens, S. N.; Wiener, L.; Kasparian, H.; Brest, A. N.; Bacharach, B.; Noble, P. H.; Templeton, J. Y. (1972). "Evaluation and surgical management of acute evolving myocardial infarction." The Journal of Thoracic and Cardiovascular Surgery. 64 (4): 495–502. doi:10.1016/S0022-5223(19)39706-5.
- Dillavou, E. D.; Kahn, M. B.; Carabasi, R. A.; Smullens, S. N.; DiMuzio, P. J. (1999). "Long-term follow-up of reoperative carotid surgery." The American Journal of Surgery. 178 (3): 197–200. doi:10.1016/S0002-9610(99)00139-7. PMID 10527438.
- Kahn, M. B.; Patterson, H. K.; Seltzer, J.; Fitzpatrick, M.; Smullens, S.; Bell, R.; DiMuzio, P.; Carabasi, R. A. (1999). "Early carotid endarterectomy in selected stroke patients." Annals of Vascular Surgery. 13 (5): 463–467. doi:10.1007/s100169900282. PMID 10452331.
- Lenow, J. L.; Bales, R.; Smullens, S. N. (2003). "The JeffCare preceptor model for asthma: a primary care physician tutorial training model." Disease Management. 6 (1): 35–42. doi:10.1089/109350703321530864. PMID 12899566.
