= Jacob C. Gutman =

American businessman and philanthropist

Jacob C. Gutman in 1926 (Gutman family)

Jacob Charles Gutman (March 19, 1890 – October 10, 1981) was an American businessman and philanthropist. With a group of businessmen he co-founded Philadelphia's Albert Einstein Medical Center in 1953; was president of Philadelphia's Federation of Jewish Agencies and its successor, the Allied Jewish Appeal; and in 1951 became the first Jewish vice-chairman of Philadelphia's United Way not born in the United States or Germany. He was president of Pressman-Gutman Corporation of New York City and Philadelphia, a textile manufacturing concern still in existence.

Gutman's son, Alvin C. "Vene" Gutman (1919–2011), subsequently president of Pressman-Gutman, and Alvin's wife, Mary Bert Gutman, built the Paul J. Gutman Library, the central library at Philadelphia University, in memory of their son, Paul J. Gutman, Jacob's grandson, a textile manufacturer affiliated with his grandfather's company. Paul J. Gutman died in an airplane accident in 1990.

== Early life ==
Jacob C. Gutman was born in Kyiv, Ukraine, in 1890. He was the second of seven children of Ukrainian-Jewish immigrants Joseph Barnet Gutman (1861–1934) and Henrietta Atlas (Eideles) Gutman (1862–1931). After emigrating to the United States in 1883, Barnet Gutman apprenticed with a Philadelphia tailor before in 1889 founding the Peerless Manufacturing Company, manufacturers of women's underwear and, later, leather belts and handbags. Peerless went bankrupt in 1901 before sustaining year-to-year profits immediately preceding World War I, when the company was renamed E. Gutman and Sons to reflect management of the company under Barnet and Etta Gutman's sons.

Along with brothers David, Joseph, Harry, and Ted Gutman, principals of E. Gutman and Sons, Jacob Gutman was educated at Philadelphia's Central High School and Philadelphia University, then called Philadelphia Textile College. He married Ida Pressman (1893–1962) in 1912 and joined his father-in-law, Harry Pressman, in Pressman's clothing manufacturing business. The company was soon renamed Pressman-Gutman Company.

== Business and philanthropic activities ==
By the mid-1920s he had begun devoting most of his spare time to philanthropic causes. He was the first president of the Association for Jewish Children. He was a trustee and member of the advisory council of the YMHA/YWHA branch of the Jewish Ys and Centers. In 1927 he became the youngest president of Congregation Beth El, a synagogue in West Philadelphia. He was the first vice-president of the Federation of Jewish Charities, which would merge after World War II to become Philadelphia's Allied Jewish Appeal (AJA), descended from an eastern European family, and he was elected its president in 1949. He was a trustee of the Jewish Hospital and in 1953 oversaw its merger with Northern Liberties Hospital to become the Albert Einstein Medical Center, which he served as trustee and finance committee member. He was active in Philadelphia's Congregation Rodeph Shalom and helped found and contributed to the holdings of the Philadelphia Museum of Jewish Art there.

Gutman became known in Philadelphia for bridging the social, financial, and educational divide between Jews whose families had emigrated to the United States from Germany and Austria prior to America's Civil War and those who, like Gutman's father, came from nations comprising the former Jewish Pale of Settlement—the present countries of Latvia, Lithuania, Belarus, Ukraine, Poland, and westernmost Russia—in the deluge of immigration associated with pogroms against Jews following the assassination of Czar Alexander II of Russia in 1881. He was considered expert on the subject of German-Russian Jewish relations in America.

== Later life ==
Gutman retired from active management of Pressman-Gutman in 1962 after the death of his wife and spent the next twenty years devoting his energies to improving the lives of Jews in Philadelphia, in Israel, and around the world. He was married a second time to the former Diane Ravitch in 1965.

Gutman was a trustee and honorary fellow of the Jewish Theological Seminary of America and served as its secretary and treasurer. He was also a trustee of Dropsie University, which awarded him an honorary doctor of humane letters degree in 1965. Also in 1965 he received the Louis Marshall Society Award and the Federation Allied Jewish Appeal Humanitarian Award.

Jacob C. Gutman died in Philadelphia of natural causes on October 10, 1981, at the age of 91.
