= ECRI Institute =

American healthcare research nonprofit

ECRI
- Formation: 1968
- Founded: 1968
- Founder: Joel J. Nobel
- Purpose: Patient safety and healthcare solutions
- Location: Fort Washington, Pennsylvania
- Region served: Worldwide
- President/CEO: Marcus Schabacker
- Website: ecri.org

ECRI (originally founded as Emergency Care Research Institute) is an American independent healthcare research nonprofit organization originally located in Plymouth Meeting, Pennsylvania, now in Fort Washington, Pennsylvania. It is tasked with "advancing evidence-based healthcare globally for the benefit of patients everywhere."

== History ==
In the early 1960s, Joel J. Nobel, a surgeon and inventor, founded the institute after a four-year-old boy died when a resuscitator failed to work. Nobel utilized the institute to focus on improving cardiopulmonary resuscitation technology, design, and deployment.

Among Nobel's inventions was the MAX Cart, a mobile resuscitation system. Designed and patented in 1965 during Nobel's residency at Pennsylvania Hospital, the cart carries instruments for cardiopulmonary resuscitation and other medical supplies while functioning as a support litter. A prototype is in the permanent collection of the Medicine and Science Division of the Smithsonian National Museum of American History. In 1966, Life profiled the invention in a feature called "MAX, the Lifesaver."

ECRI began comparative evaluations of medical device brands and models in 1971. Since its designation in 1997 as an Evidence-based Practice Center with the Agency for Healthcare Research and Quality (AHRQ), it has undertaken reviews of clinical procedures using meta-analysis for the Medicare program, other federal and state agencies, and clinical specialty organizations.

In 2001, Jeffrey C. Lerner became the second president and CEO. The organization rebranded as ECRI Institute in 2007. On March 8, 2020, the organization rebranded as ECRI. In 2018, Marcus Schabacker became ECRI's third president and CEO.

The Institute for Safe Medication Practices became an ECRI affiliate in 2020. In 2024 ECRI acquired The Just Culture Company to help transform healthcare workplaces through just culture. In April 2026, ECRI spun off its Spend Management and Recall Management solutions in a new, independent company: Staritas, powered by a growth investment from Accel-KKR.

== Designations ==
ECRI Patient Safety Organization was listed as a federal patient safety organization by the U.S. Department of Health and Human Services under the Patient Safety and Quality Improvement Act of 2005.

ECRI entered into a licensing agreement to adapt the Pennsylvania Patient Safety Reporting System (PA-PSRS), to meet Pennsylvania-specific reporting requirements. The resulting PA-PSRS system is fully owned by the Pennsylvania Patient Safety Authority.

== Services ==
The organization was the sole prime contractor for developing and maintaining AHRQ's National Guideline Clearinghouse, a database of clinical practice guidelines, since its inception in 1998 and the National Quality Measures Clearinghouse, a database of evidence-based healthcare quality measures, since its inception in 2001. Both contracts ended in July 2018 due to the lack of federal funding through AHRQ to continue their operation.

ECRI created and maintains the Universal Medical Device Nomenclature System (UMDNS).
