= Crash cart =

Wheeled cupboard containing emergency medication and equipment

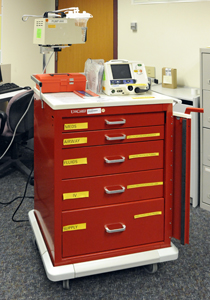
A crash cart at the John D. Dingell VA Medical Center in Detroit, Michigan.

A crash cart, code cart, crash trolley or "MAX cart" is a set of trays/drawers/shelves on wheels used in hospitals for transportation and dispensing of emergency medication/equipment at site of medical/surgical emergency for life support protocols (ACLS/ALS) to potentially save someone's life. The cart carries instruments for cardiopulmonary resuscitation and other medical supplies while also functioning as a support litter for the patient.

The crash cart was originally designed and patented by ECRI Institute founder, Joel J. Nobel, M.D., while a surgical resident at Philadelphia's Pennsylvania Hospital in 1965. MAX helped enhance hospital's efficiency in emergencies by enabling doctors and nurses to save time, thereby increasing the chances of saving a life.

The contents and organization of a crash cart vary from hospital to hospital, country to country, and specialty to specialty, but typically contain the tools and drugs needed to treat a person in or near cardiac arrest or another life-threatening condition. These include but are not limited to:

- Monitor/defibrillators, suction devices, and bag valve masks (BVMs) of different sizes
- Advanced cardiac life support (ACLS) drugs such as adrenaline (epinephrine), amiodarone, atropine, dopamine, lidocaine, phentolamine, sodium bicarbonate, and vasopressin
- First line drugs for treatment of common problems such as: adenosine, dextrose, epinephrine for IM use, naloxone, nitroglycerin, and others
- Drugs for rapid sequence intubation: succinylcholine or another paralytic, and a sedative such as etomidate, propofol or midazolam; endotracheal tubes and other intubating equipment
- Drugs for peripheral and central venous access
- Electronic metronome to provide standardized auditory cadence cues during CPR
- Pediatric equipment (common pediatric drugs, intubation equipment, etc.)
- Other drugs and equipment as chosen by the facility

Hospitals typically have internal intercom codes used for situations when someone has suffered a cardiac arrest or a similar potentially fatal condition outside of the emergency department or intensive care unit (where such conditions already happen frequently and do not require special announcements). When such codes are given, hospital staff and volunteers are expected to clear the corridors, and to direct visitors to stand aside as the crash cart and a team of physicians, pharmacists and nurses may come through at any moment. (See Code Blue.)

== History in the United States ==
Another version of the cardiac crash cart was created in 1962 at Bethany Medical Center in Kansas City, Kansas, home to the first cardiac care unit in the country. The version of the crash cart was designed by a nurse and fabricated by the father of one of the doctors. It contained an Ambu bag, defibrillator paddles, a bed board and endotracheal tubes.

An emergency department nurse, Anita Dorr, developed a prototype of a crash cart in 1967 that looked and worked like crash carts used today. Dorr was supervising the Emergency Department of Meyer Memorial Hospital (now Erie County Medical Center) in Buffalo, New York. She found it took too long to gather supplies for cardiac and respiratory arrests. Dorr, with her fellow nurses, put together a list of emergency response supplies, meds and equipment, and built an "Emergency Nursing Crisis Cart" with her spouse in their garage in 1967. Dorr was not able to patent her cart design but she went on to co-found the Emergency Department Nurses Association (now the Emergency Nurses Association) in 1968.

Before Dorr invented her crash cart prototype there was a doctor, Joel Noble MD, who invented a cart called the Max cart which was actually a table for patients to lie on. The Max crash cart had drawers for medical supplies and other equipment such as a cardiac compressor and an electrocardiograph machine. The table had equipment to record ECG readouts. Dorr's crash cart looked and functioned like the crash carts that we use today. Dr Nobel's version was more of a table for patients to lie on with drawers of supplies and equipment.

== In computing ==
In the computer industry, the term crash cart is used, by analogy to its original meaning in medicine, to mean a cart that can be connected to a server that is malfunctioning such that that remote access to it is impossible, the intention being to "resuscitate" the server to the point where remote administration works again. Crash carts most commonly include a keyboard, mouse, and monitor, because most servers in a modern high-density environment do not have user input/output devices.

Crash carts are a method of last resort in data centers which employ various forms of out-of-band management. In those cases it is used for equipment which does not support the requisite out-of-band infrastructure (OOBI) features or in cases where the OOBI devices (concentrators, switches, terminal servers, etc.) or services themselves have failed.

The term "crash cart" can also refer to a bootable removable medium containing an operating system and any relevant software used to recover computer equipment (such as a server or PC) from a state of failure. This is done when such recovery is not possible using the computer's existing operating system and software. Crash carts in this sense are historically tape cartridges ("carts") or more recently, external or removable hard drives.
