= Your Candidates-Your Health =

Your Candidates–Your Health is an initiative launched by Research!America and partner organizations to inform voters of their presidential and congressional candidates’ views on health and research. The resource is a free, online voter education tool featuring candidates’ responses to questions about health and research.

== History ==
In 2006, all candidates for the United States House of Representatives and Senate were invited to respond to a 10-question survey on several health and research issues, including stem cell research, research funding and global competitiveness in innovation. Candidates' responses, along with the public's view on the same questions, were posted on the Your Candidates–Your Health website and were available to educate voters’ decisions in the 2006 congressional elections.

The initiative continued in 2007 with attention shifted to the 2008 United States presidential election. Presidential candidates from both parties were asked 17 questions in a survey on health, research and other related issues. The questionnaire covered topics such as the American health care system and its costs; health care coverage; electronic health records; global health; stem cell research; global competitiveness in innovation; and funding for the National Institutes of Health (NIH), the Centers for Disease Control and Prevention (CDC), the Agency for Healthcare Research and Quality (AHRQ) and the Food and Drug Administration (FDA).

The nonpartisan initiative was advertised in key primary states in early 2008. As part of its promotion, voters were asked to contact candidates and encourage them to respond to the survey. Presidential candidate Senator Barack Obama and Senator John McCain responded.

The initiative is now collecting responses from the 2012 presidential and congressional candidates. As March 2012, responses from President Barack Obama and presidential candidate Newton Gingrich are available.
