= Joel J. Nobel =

American anesthesiologist

Joel Judovich Nobel (December 8, 1934 – August 13, 2014) was an American anesthesiologist and patient safety advocate best known for founding the crash cart and ECRI Institute.

== Early life and education ==
Nobel was born in Pennsylvania, one of three children born to Philadelphia doctors Dr. Golda R. Nobel and Dr. Bernard D. Judovich. His mother was a psychiatrist who lived to age 107, while his father was a general practitioner.

Nobel graduated from Friends Select School in 1952. He earned an undergraduate degree in English from Haverford College in 1956, followed by a master's in international relations from the University of Pennsylvania in 1958 and a medical degree from Jefferson Medical College in 1963. His residency was interrupted by the Vietnam War, when he served in the Navy.

== Career ==
In 1968, a four-year-old patient of his at the Presbyterian Hospital at University of Pittsburgh Medical Center died due to a faulty bag valve mask. Nobel, who had alerted others on the staff several times that it was not working properly, was deeply affected by the child's death. "Anger is a great source of energy," he later wrote of the reaction to the incident.

Nobel tested others of those devices on the market and found many to be ineffective. After failing to find anyone to publish his findings, he set up the Emergency Care Research Institute in the 1960s (now ECRI Institute) to publish the Health Devices Journal, which shared information about medical devices.

Nobel invented the MAX cart, which was a new type of crash cart.

== Personal life ==
He was married first to Bonnie Sue Goldberg, and later to Qingqing Lu. He died at his Gladwyne, Pennsylvania home from complications of cancer and diabetes, at age 79. He was survived by his sons Joshua and Adam, and daughter Erika.
