= Harvey Rosenberg Bauman =

Christian medical missionary (1897–1970)

Harvey Rosenberger Bauman (February 26, 1897 – October 4, 1970) was an American medical missionary, who with his wife Ella Gerber-Bauman (1895–1989), established the first general hospital in Champa, India of the General Conference of Mennonite Mission. Later both served as directors of cancer detection at the Allentown General Hospital in Pennsylvania.

== Early life and education ==
Bauman was born in Congo, Montgomery County, Pennsylvania, to farmer parents Samuel W. and Clara Rosenberger Bauman. Bauman grew up in a religious household.

=== Education ===
Bauman attended primary school in Milford Township Buck County, PA. Bauman went to Quakertown High School (1911–14), where he graduated, and began to briefly pursue studies at Perkiomen Seminary (1914–15). He then pursued higher education at Bluffton College in Ohio (1916–19). In summer of 1919, Bauman attended Muhlenberg College. Afterward, Bauman returned to Pennsylvania, where he attended Jefferson Medical College (1919–23) and interned at Allentown General Hospital (1923–24) the year following his completion. While his wife was interning at AGH, Bauman worked as a physician at Phoenix Utility Company, Hawley, PA.

=== Family ===
On June 11, 1924, Bauman married Ella Gerber. The marriage produced five children: Kenneth, Clara Ann, Albert Samuel, Mary Harvella, and Elizabeth Ruth. Albert and Elizabeth went on to become medical missionaries. Son Kenneth became a religious missionary in India.

== Mission ==
The Baumans received their missionary "call" and went to India 3 October 1925. They studied language for their first year while raising funds for the new hospital. Bauman supervised the construction by F.J. Isaac of the Christian General Hospital in Champa. In addition, he led the clinical staff including medicine compounders(a form of pharmacist), nurses, and the paramedics. construction of the hospital started in 1927 and 1931. By 1928 the partially completed General hospital at Chamapa was serving more than 3500 patients with outpatient, inpatient, and surgical services. In 1930 there were 3857 pateients served.

While in India, Bauman served as the Chief Medical Officer at Bethesda Leper Home and Christian (General) Hospital, which he and his wife established, beginning in 1926. The general hospital was started separately from the Leper Home to serve patients who did not have Leprosy. Bauman also served in other capacity in India outside of the hospital, such as being a pastor.

== Return to the US and death ==
Bauman and his wife concluded their work in India in 1961. They returned to Pennsylvania and were named co-directors of the cancer detection department of Allentown General Hospital (AGH). In retirement, Bauman maintained his membership in the West Swamp Mennonite Church, in Quakertown, PA.

Bauman died in 1970 of a heart attack at his home in Coopersburg, Pennsylvania.

== Legacy ==
Bauman and his wife founded Christian Hospital in Champa, India. The hospital now operates as the Emmanuel Hospital Association Champa Christian Hospital. EHA Champa Christian Hospital focuses on those who are poor and marginalized.
