= Benjamin Starnes =

American physician and vascular surgeon

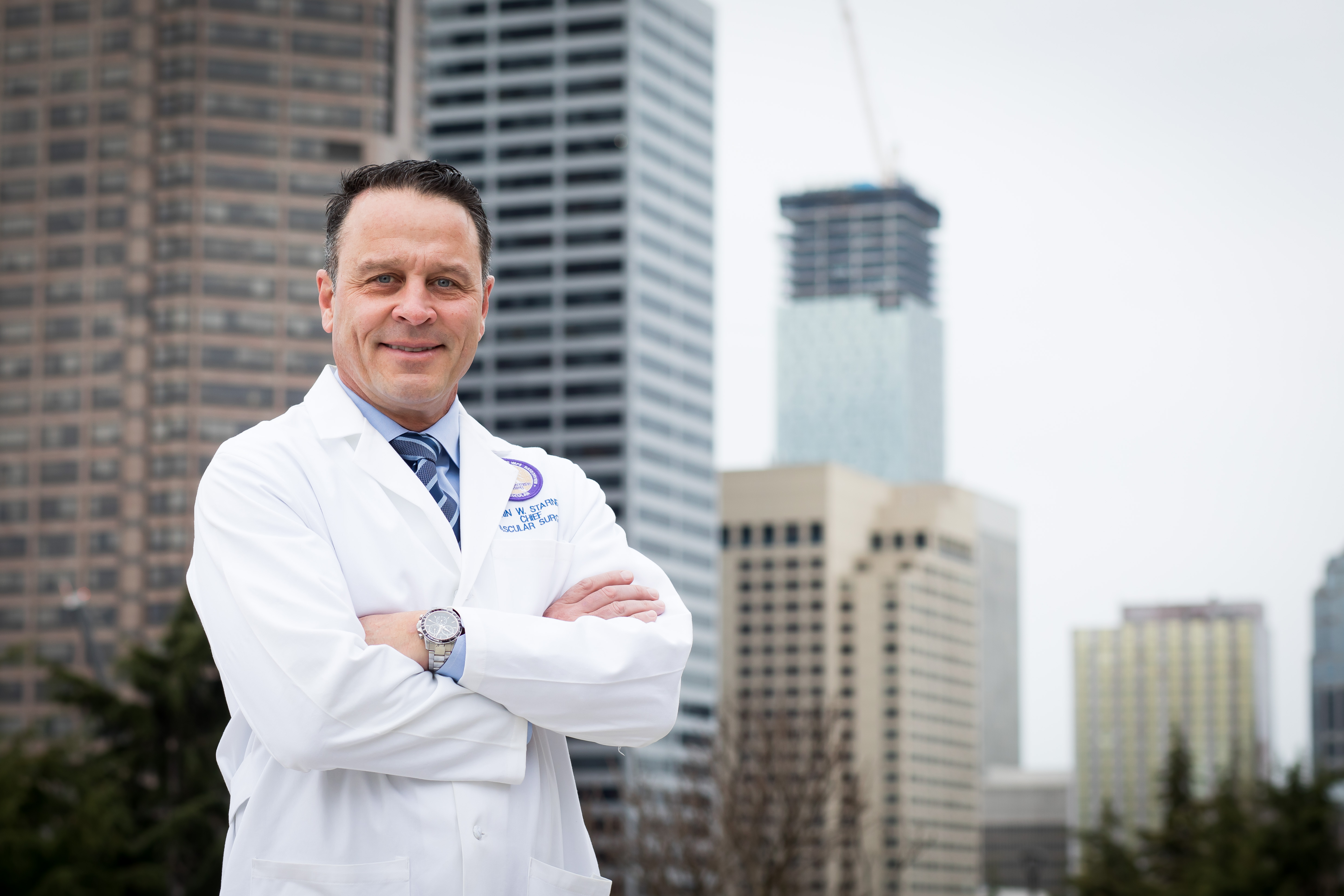

Personal details
- Born: Delaware
- Spouse: Marjorie Starnes
- Children: Cara Elise, Jessica Nicole
- Education: Albright College; Jefferson Medical College
- Occupation: Physician

Military service
- Branch/service: US Army Medical Corps
- Rank: Lieutenant Colonel
- Unit: 250th Forward Surgical Team
- Battles/wars: Kosovo War, Iraq War

Benjamin Starnes (born 1966) is a vascular surgeon and medical researcher. He holds the Alexander Whitehill Clowes Endowed Chair in Vascular surgery at the University of Washington. He served as a U.S. Army surgeon for 15 years, doing three tours of duty, including in the last M.A.S.H. unit. On the day of the September 11 attacks he was at the Pentagon rendering medical aid to victims, and his experience was later recounted in the book American Phoenix: Heroes of the Pentagon on 9/11. He is among the primary authors of the official guidelines for diagnosis and management of aortic disease adopted by the American College of Cardiology and the American Heart Association.

== Early life and education ==
Starnes was raised in Odessa, DE by his father Ronald, a Methodist minister who taught philosophy and religion at Wesley College (Delaware), and his mother Martha, an elementary school teacher. In 1985 he earned the rank of Eagle Scout in the Boy Scouts of America. Starnes graduated with a BS from Albright College and received his MD from Jefferson Medical College in 1992.

== Career ==
After medical school, Starnes joined the U.S. Army. In 1998 and 1999, he was part of Task Force Hawk, supporting the NATO and U.S. involvement in the Kosovo War. Starnes, who became a captain, was stationed in Albania in the U.S. Army's last M.A.S.H. unit.

Starnes served as a vascular surgery fellow at Walter Reed Army Medical Center during the September 11 attacks. When American Airlines Flight 77 crashed into the Pentagon, Starnes provided medical care to the injured. Soon after, Starnes encouraged his brother to write a book about the events. Starnes recounts his experience in the book.

In 2003, Starnes deployed to Iraq as a major and vascular surgeon. He was in the 250th Forward Surgical Team stationed at the Bashur Air Base in Northern Iraq. Starnes became a lieutenant colonel.

Starnes completed 15 years of service as an army surgeon and served three tours of duty, including two in Iraq.

Starnes later became chief of vascular surgery and professor of surgery at the University of Washington in Seattle. He holds the Alexander Whitehill Clowes Endowed Chair in Vascular Surgery.

Starnes founded the company Aortica in 2014, which produced technology for treating complex abdominal aortic aneurysm disease. In 2017, he led clinical trials of Aortica's technology at Seattle's Harborview Medical Center.

== Research ==
In 2010, Starnes and his colleagues published a study on outcomes of different treatment regimens for hospital patients with ruptured abdominal aortic aneurysm, an injury with short-term survival rate of less than 58% in one hospital study. The study found that the survivability rate increases when patients with different injury characterics are placed into corresponding treatment regimens such as endovascular aneurysm repair, open surgery, or palliative care.

In 2012, Starnes was an author of research providing a classification system for patients with blunt thoracic aortic injuries. The system is intended to guide therapy based on probable patient outcomes given the type of injuries.

In 2017, Starnes published clinical trial results for an emerging type of treatment for patients with juxtarenal aortic aneurysms. Starnes tested the efficacy of endovascular grafts made by a physician specifically for the patient, instead of grafts manufactured beforehand. The research found that physician-modified grafts were successful long-term for 94% of patients in the trial of 59 people.

To develop further guidelines for medical decisions on vascular surgery, Starnes and colleagues in 2018 studied mortality rates of ruptured abdominal aortic aneurysm hospital patients, examining which factors before surgery predict mortality. He and his colleagues developed a scoring system based on age, systolic blood pressure, and creatinine concentration values. They found that higher scores predicted low survival rates and thus low benefits of surgery.

Starnes is among the primary authors of the official guidelines for diagnosis and management of aortic disease adopted by the American College of Cardiology and American Heart Association

== Personal life ==
Starnes is married to Marjorie Starnes. They have two daughters.
