= National Guideline Clearinghouse =

Organization (1998–2018)

National Guideline Clearinghouse

National Guideline Clearinghouse (NGC) was a database of evidence-based clinical practice guidelines and related documents started in 1998. It ended July 18, 2018 due to loss of federal funding (as well as for the National Quality Measures Clearinghouse [NQMC]). The entire content of the NGC was available free of charge at The Alliance for the Implementation of Clinical Practice Guidelines. This site will begin uploading more current references in April 2020.

Historically, it had been maintained as a public resource by the Agency for Healthcare Research and Quality (AHRQ) of the U.S. Department of Health and Human Services. The NGC aimed to provide physicians, nurses, and other health professionals, health care providers, health plans, integrated delivery systems, purchasers and others an accessible mechanism for obtaining objective, detailed information on clinical practice guidelines and to further their dissemination, implementation and use. The database was updated weekly with new and revised guidelines. The currency of all guidelines was verified annually through NGC's Annual Verification process.

The site featured:

- A Guideline Comparison utility that gives users the ability to generate side-by-side comparisons for any combination of two or more guidelines
- Guideline Syntheses prepared by NGC staff, comparing guidelines covering similar topics, highlighting areas of similarity and difference. NGC Guideline Syntheses often provide a comparison of guidelines developed in different countries, providing insight into commonalities and differences in international health practices.
- An electronic forum, NGC-L for exchanging information on clinical practice guidelines, their development, implementation and use
- An Annotated Bibliography database where users can search for citations for publications and resources about guidelines, including guideline development and methodology, structure, evaluation, and implementation.

== See also ==
- ECRI Institute
- U.S. Food and Drug Administration (FDA)
