= Jacob Mendes Da Costa =

American physician

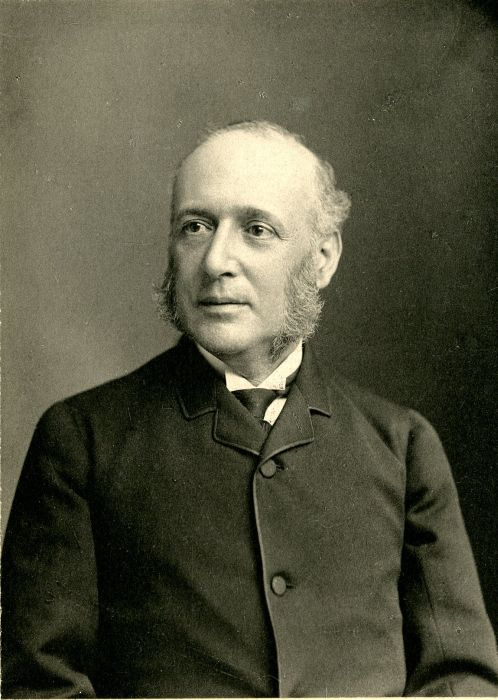
- Born: February 7, 1833; Saint Thomas, Danish Virgin Islands
- Died: September 12, 1900 (aged 67); Villanova, Pennsylvania, U.S.
- Burial place: Woodlands Cemetery
- Education: Jefferson Medical College, M.D. (1852)
- Known for: Da Costa's syndrome
- Relatives: John H. Brinton (brother-in-law)

Jacob Mendes Da Costa, or Jacob Mendez Da Costa (February 7, 1833, Saint Thomas, Danish Virgin Islands, Caribbean – September 12, 1900) was an American physician.

He is particularly known for discovering Da Costa's syndrome (also known as soldier's heart), an anxiety disorder combining effort fatigue, dyspnea, a sighing respiration, palpitation and sweating that he first observed in soldiers in the American Civil War and documented in an 1871 study.

He was born into the small community of Sephardi Jews on St. Thomas, then still a Danish colony. At the age of four, Da Costa left the island for mainland Europe, where he attended gymnasium. As a result of his childhood travel and international education, Da Costa originally wanted to enter the foreign service. However, his mother encouraged him to attend medical school. He applied to enter Jefferson Medical College (now Thomas Jefferson University) and earned his medical degree in 1852. During the Civil War he served as a physician at the Military Hospital as well as Turner's Lane Hospital, Philadelphia. It was during this period that he gathered much of the evidence that used in his 1871 study of anxiety disorders.

He later taught at the Jefferson Medical College (now Thomas Jefferson University), where he became a respected and sought after lecturer.

Da Costa's interest in the humanities remained with him throughout his life. He believed that a truly gifted physician required a knowledge of both science and art. In 1883, he told the graduating class of Jefferson Medical College that,

I think that the cultivation of the humane letters has the most distinct bearing on the cultivation and appreciation of science. Science is nothing without imagination; and imagination is most readily kept fresh by literature. What little good there is a mere descriptive person, and in the small facts which with painful toil he accumulates. But let these facts be welded together by thought, their bearing traced by imagination, experiments devised by the mind projecting itself in advance of them, and the plodder is likely to become the great discoverer.

In 1860 he married Sarah Frederica Brinton, the sister of his friend and colleague, Professor John Hill Brinton. Their only son who survived infancy, Charles Frederick, became a lawyer. Another son, John M. Da Costa, died two months old in 1865.

He was elected as a member to the American Philosophical Society in 1866.

He died on September 12, 1900, and was buried at Woodlands Cemetery.

== Irritable Heart ==
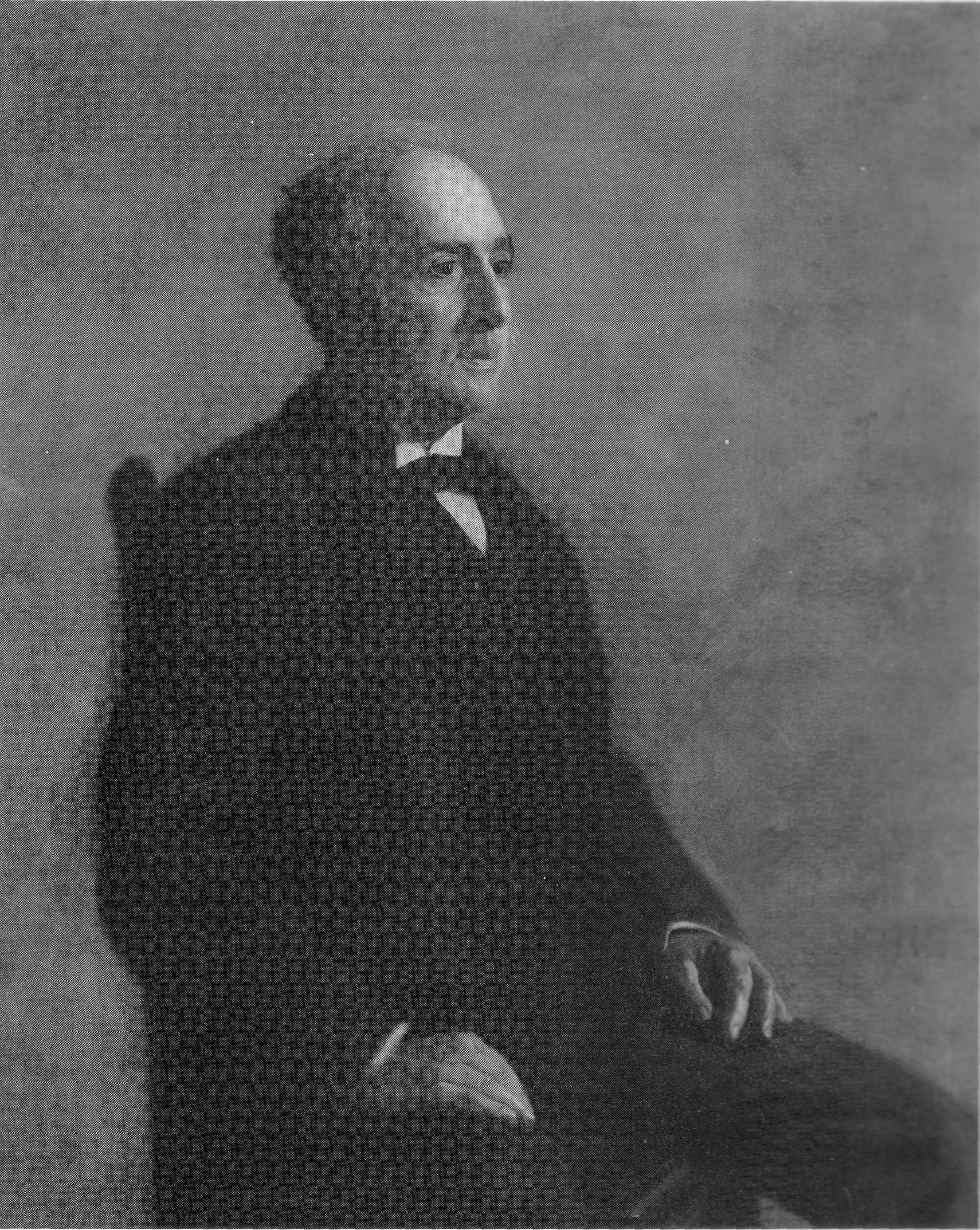
Portrait of Da Costa by Thomas Eakins

Jacob Da Costa worked at Satterlee General Hospital in Philadelphia during the American Civil War. While there, he studied over 400 patients with non-specific cardiac complaints. As a result of these studies, he identified a new condition he termed "irritable heart" (sometimes called Da Costa Syndrome) in 1862. By 1871 he published his landmark study of the condition.

== Literary works ==
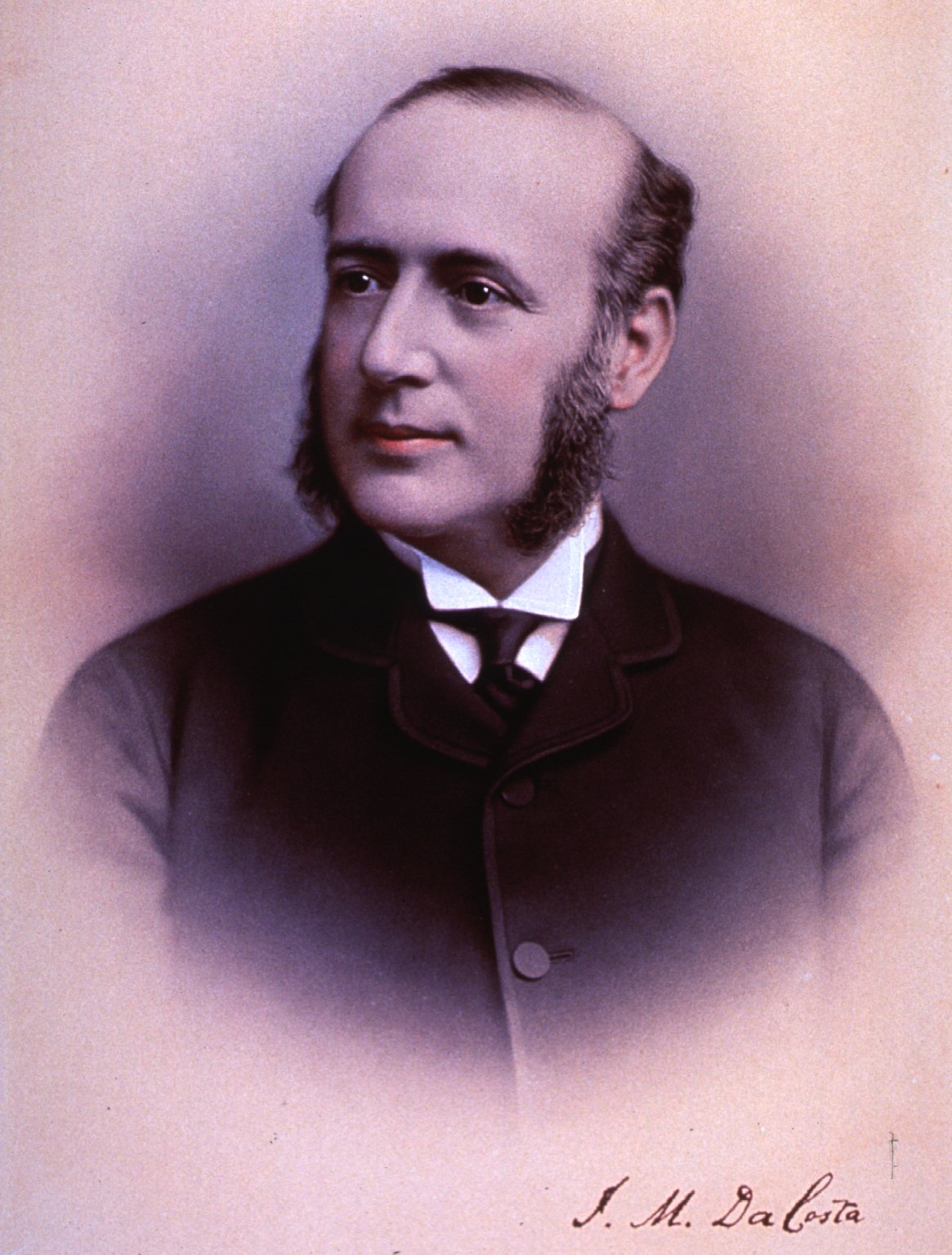

- Medical Diagnosis, 1864
- "Observations on the diseases of the heart noticed among soldiers, particularly the organic diseases" in Contributions relating to the Causation and Prevention of Disease, and to Camp Diseases; together with a Report of the Diseases, etc., Among the Prisoners at Andersonville, GA (New York: United States Sanitary Commission by Hurd and Houghton, 1867).
