= Richard Smeyne =

American neuroscientist

Richard Jay Smeyne is a neuroscientist who is currently Professor and Chair of the Department of Neuroscience at Thomas Jefferson University, where he is also Director of the Jefferson Comprehensive Parkinson's Disease and Movement Disorder Center at the Vickie and Jack Farber Institute for Neuroscience. His research is focused on the cell biology of Parkinson's disease, as well as neuroprotection.

He received his doctorate in neuroanatomy from Thomas Jefferson University in 1989, and undertook postdoctoral training at the Roche Institute of Molecular Biology studying with Dr. Jim Morgan and Tom Curran. As a postdoctoral fellow, Dr. Smeyne, along with colleagues in the Morgan and Curran lab were one of the first to generate a transgenic mouse that expressed the transgene under the control of its cognate promoter. In 1992, following his postdoctoral work, he started his own lab at the Bristol Myers Squibb Pharmaceutical Research Center in Princeton NJ. At BMS, he collaborated with the lab of Dr. Mariano Barbacid to generate and analyze mice carrying mutations of the neurotrophin receptors TrkA, TrkB and TrkC. In 1994, Dr. Smeyne left BMS and was named the Head of the Neurogenetics Program in the Division of CNS Research at Hoffmann-La Roche. In 1996 following the closure of the Roche Institute of Molecular Biology, Dr. Smeyne was recruited to the faculty at Saint Jude Children's Research Hospital, where he joined, as an Associate Member rising to Full Member, in the Department of Developmental Neurobiology. It was at SJCRH that Dr. Smeyne started his research program examining the cellular and molecular underpinnings of Parkinson's disease. In 2016, after 20 years at SJCRH, Dr. Smeyne was recruited to Thomas Jefferson University as a Full Professor and to be Head of the Comprehensive Parkinson's Disease Center. Under his leadership, the JCPDC was named a Center of Excellence by the Parkinson's Foundation.

Dr. Smeyne has had a long-standing interest in the cell biology of Parkinson’s disease, with studies examining both environmental and genetic causation. His lab was one the first to show, in animal models of PD, that exercise could modify disease progression, and more recently has been examining the underlying molecular programs responsible for this neuroprotection . He is also recognized for his work examining interactions of the peripheral immune system with that of the brain’s innate immune system immune as well as the role of viruses in the etiology of Parkinson’s disease. Dr. Smeyne has a long history of service to the community. He has previously served as the Chair of the Clinical and Scientific Advisory Board for the Parkinson’s Foundation. as well as continued service on numerous review panels for the NIH, MJFF foundation and Parkinson's' UK. His lab is currently funded by the NIH, Aligning Science Across Parkinson's (Team Tansey) and the Vickie and Jack Farber Foundation for Neuroscience.

According to PubMed, Dr. Smeyne has published 125 papers and has an H-Index of 70. He was recently named by research.com to the list of top 1,000 neuroscientists in the USA.
