= Paul J. Gutman Library =

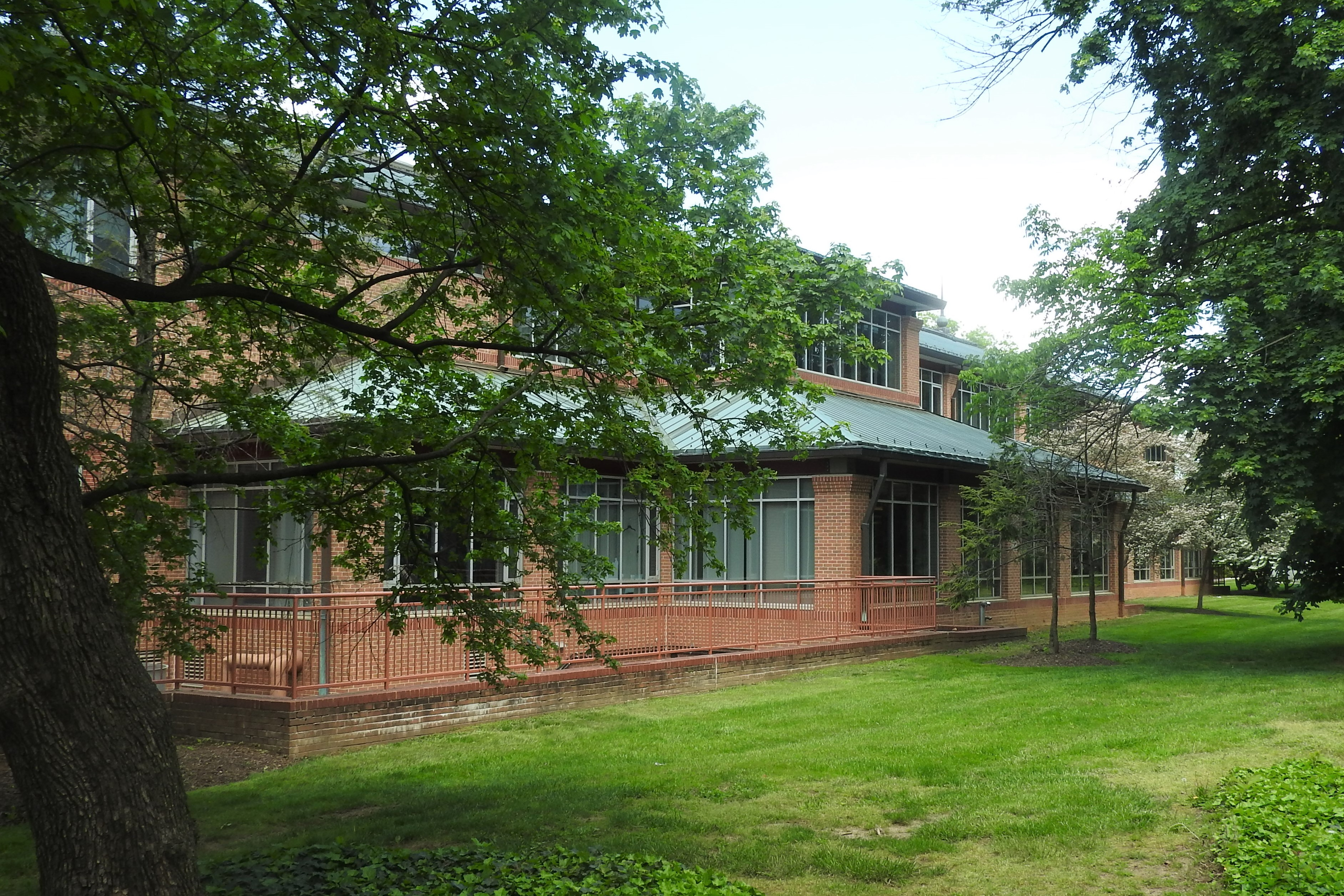
- 40°1′20″N 75°11′28″W
- Location: East Falls, Philadelphia, Pennsylvania, United States
- Type: University Library
- Established: October 10, 1992

Collection
- Size: 150,000

Other information
- Director: Karen Albert
- Website: http://www.philau.edu/library/

The Paul J. Gutman Library is the main library of Thomas Jefferson University, which is located in the East Falls section of Philadelphia, Pennsylvania. The Gutman Library opened in 1992 to replace the university's Pastore Library (now the Architecture & Design School). The architectural firm of Shepley Bulfinch was responsible for the building's design. In 1993, the library won the Louis I. Kahn Award for best-designed academic building from American School and University, a national publication for educational institutions.

== Historical background ==
Construction of the library, which opened October 10, 1992, was made possible by a donation by Alvin C. and Mary Bert Gutman in memory of their son, Paul J. Gutman. Paul J. Gutman died on September 25, 1990, in an airplane accident while on a business trip for Pressman-Gutman, the Bala-Cynwyd, Pennsylvania, textile converting company founded by his great-grandfather, Harry J. Pressman.

Paul's grandfather, Jacob C. Gutman (1890-1981), president of Pressman-Gutman, and four of his Gutman granduncles graduated from the university at the turn of the 20th century when it was Philadelphia Textile School. His granduncles were members of E. Gutman and Sons, the textile firm founded in 1889 by their father, J. Barnett Gutman (1861-1934).

Karen Albert is currently director of the Paul J. Gutman Library at Thomas Jefferson University. She succeeded the library's inaugural director, Stephen J. Bell, in 2007.

== Resources ==
The 54,000-square-foot Paul J. Gutman Library seats 400 people. Its design combines a traditional book-and-journal collection with an extensive electronic environment. Through its website, the library delivers a wide range of information resources to members of the University community on and off campus. Electronic resources include: Avery Index to Architectural Periodicals, Art Index, EBSCO, S&P’s NetLibrary, Hoover's, LexisNexis, ProQuest, MD Consult, JSTOR Stylesight, and many more.

The availability of electronic resources, including 42,000 online journals, supplements a book collection of more than 150,000 volumes, with special emphasis in the areas of art and architecture, design, textiles, sciences, and business. The Gutman Library Special Collections Department maintains one of the largest collections in the United States devoted to the history of the textile industry. A contemporary reading collection of best-sellers and popular materials is also available. Other print publications include 450 current journal, trade, and newspapers subscriptions. Materials not available in the Gutman Library collection can be obtained through an interlibrary loan network linking more than 14,000 libraries around the world, or through EZBorrow, a self-service loan system for books from over 50 of Pennsylvania's largest academic libraries.

== Building features ==
The Paul J. Gutman Library building contains individual study carrels, seven group study rooms, and student lounge areas. The library also has rooms for quiet study and group discussion.
