= Richard Kronick =

American health policy researcher

Richard Gray Kronick is an American health policy researcher and professor of family and preventive medicine at the University of California, San Diego (UCSD), where he is also an adjunct professor of political science.

== Biography ==
Kronick received his Ph.D. from the University of Rochester in political science in 1990. He first joined the UCSD faculty in 1991, and worked as a policy advisor to the Clinton administration in the early 1990s. He joined the Department of Health and Human Services (HHS) in 2010 as Deputy Assistant Secretary for Planning and Evaluation. He was the director of the HHS's Agency for Healthcare Research and Quality from August 2013 until March 2016, when he stepped down to return to his position at UCSD. When his resignation was first announced, Sylvia Burwell, the then-United States Secretary of Health and Human Services, said that "The value of AHRQ's work, and his leadership in developing that work, was never more important than it was in the past year when AHRQ's funding was at risk."

== Honors and awards ==
Kronick was named one of Modern Healthcare's 100 Most Influential People in 2014; that same year, he was elected to the National Academy of Medicine.

== Personal life ==
Kronick married Amy Beth Bridges in 1981, while he was studying for his Ph.D. at the University of Rochester.
