= Bluffton University =

Mennonite university in Bluffton, Ohio, US

- Former names: Central Mennonite College (1899–1913); Bluffton College (1913–2004)
- Motto: The Truth Makes Free
- Type: Private university
- Established: 1899; 127 years ago
- Religious affiliation: Mennonite Church USA
- Endowment: $23,521,163
- President: Alex Sider
- Faculty: 55 (45 part-time)
- Students: 745 (fall 2022)
- Location: Bluffton, Ohio, United States; 40.896°N 83.898°W
- Campus: 234 acres (Rural)
- Colors: Bluffton purple and white
- Nickname: Beavers
- Mascots: J. Denny and Jenny Beaver
- Website: bluffton.edu

Bluffton University is a private Mennonite university in Bluffton, Ohio, United States. It is accredited by the Higher Learning Commission, with three programs that have earned programmatic accreditation: education, nursing and social work. The university has more than ninety majors, minors, and interdisciplinary programs, and eighteen NCAA Division III athletic teams and a co-ed esports team.

== History ==
The university was founded as Central Mennonite College by the General Conference Mennonite Church in 1899. When the first president, Noah Hirschy, resigned in 1908, the college had only one building.

In 1913, under President Samuel Mosiman (1910–1935), the college reorganized as Bluffton College with support from five Mennonite groups. The first baccalaureate degrees were confirmed in 1915.

By 1930 enrollment had increased to 371 students, but it fell to 185 by 1936 as the college was battered by the Great Depression and by charges from some of its Mennonite constituency that it promoted theological liberalism. In 1929, the college had a seemingly successful fundraising drive in an effort to increase its endowment to $500,000 and qualify for accreditation from the North Central Association. However, donors were unable to make good on their pledges after the stock market crash; the college failed to gain accreditation and fell into financial crisis.

In 1931, Witmarsum Theological Seminary, which had been affiliated with the college, closed its doors for good.

Musselman Library was completed in 1930, joining College Hall (1900) and Science Hall (1913, later renamed Berky Hall) as the primary academic buildings.

After the brief presidency of Arthur Rosenberger (1935–1938), Lloyd Ramseyer assumed the Bluffton College presidency in 1938 and served until 1965. Although enrollment plummeted to as low as 77 students during World War II, Ramseyer's tenure was marked by growth and expansion. Enrollment surpassed 300 in 1957 and 400 in 1960. The college finally received NCA accreditation in 1953.

Under presidents Ramseyer and Robert Kreider (1965–1972) the college also underwent a building boom. Since 1924, Bluffton had had just two residence halls, Ropp Hall (1914) for women and Lincoln Hall (1924) for men. Ropp Annex was completed in 1958 followed by four others (Bren-Dell Hall, Hirschy Hall, Hirschy Annex and Ropp Addition) by 1967.

Other new buildings during this period included Founders Hall (1951) and an addition Burcky gymnasium (1971), a sports facility with a 2,000-seat auditorium; Mosiman Hall (1960), the music building; a four-story expansion to the library (1966); Marbeck Center (1968), a student union with dining facilities, book store and other student facilities; and Riley Court (1969), a five-building complex that now house administrative offices.

There were plans for future expansion and growth, but the 1970s instead were a time of retrenchment and conflict. Enrollment peaked at 789 in 1969 but dropped below 700 by 1972 and below 600 by 1975. The college fell deep into debt and made significant cut-backs.

Bluffton's sixth president, Ben Sprunger (1972–1977), proposed increasing enrollment by transforming Bluffton into an evangelical college. This proposal was resisted by faculty, leading to Sprunger's resignation. However, during Sprunger's term, the college managed to balance the budget, conduct a successful capital campaign and construct Shoker Science Center (1978).

Enrollment at Bluffton was below 600 for most of the 1980s, but the college experienced another era of growth and expansion in the 1990s under presidents Elmer Neufeld (1978–1996) and Lee F. Snyder (1996–2006), the first female president at Bluffton or any other Mennonite college. By 1995, the enrollment surpassed 1,000 for the first time.

The college built two new residence halls, Ramseyer Hall (1994) and Neufeld Hall (2003), to meet housing demand. Other building projects included Sauder Visual Arts Center (1991), which houses an art gallery and studios for painting, drawing, sculpture and other arts; Yoder Recital Hall (1994), a 300-seat, state-of-the-art performance facility; Centennial Hall (2000), a new academic building; Sommer Center for Health and Wellness (2013), with basketball and volleyball competition courts and a weights center; and the Austin E. Knowlton Science Center (2023), featuring labs for biology, chemistry, pre-medicine, pre-physical therapy, medical laboratory science and dietetics.

Another major addition was the Emery Sears Athletic Complex, which includes 2,600-seat Dwight Salzman Stadium (1993) plus a baseball diamond, all-weather track, and soccer field.

In 1995, Bluffton began a masters program in education, the first of its graduate programs.

In 2004, the college, which now had three graduate programs, became Bluffton University.

In 2006, James Harder became Bluffton's ninth president. He was succeeded in 2018 by Jane Wood.

Bluffton and the nearby University of Findlay announced a merger in March 2024, which was to be completed by fall 2025. However, in February 2025, the merger was announced to have been canceled.

== Beliefs ==
It is affiliated with the Mennonite Education Agency of the Mennonite Church USA.

The university added sexual orientation to its anti-discrimination policy in December 2015, allowing the hiring of openly LGBT employees.

Historian Perry Bush, in his centennial history of the college, argues that Bluffton's distinctive religious orientation has been to avoid both secularization and generic American evangelicalism. While many other denominational colleges adopted the latter, Bluffton leaders "refused to separate Mennonite ethical principles from the doctrines they held in common with other evangelicals. They refused to treat peace and service as if they were add-ons, 'nonessentials,' extra-chrome options. Christ's theological and ethical teachings were all of one piece, Mennonites have insisted, and a proper Christian college would be built on the firm integration of the two."

Evidence of this focus can be found in the high percentage of Bluffton graduates "devoting lives to service occupations: teaching, medicine, social work, church ministry, and the like."

== 2007 bus crash ==
On March 2, 2007, a bus carrying the Bluffton baseball team fell off the Northside Drive overpass on Interstate 75 in Atlanta, Georgia, after the driver apparently mistook a southbound left-side exit ramp for a high-occupancy vehicle lane. The bus crashed into and flipped over a concrete barrier on the overpass and fell 30 feet back onto the interstate.

Four members of the Bluffton baseball team were killed in the accident, along with the bus driver and his wife. A fifth player died a week later from injuries caused by the crash. On March 12, 2008, a memorial titled the "Circle of Remembrance" located near the baseball field was dedicated prior to a Service of Remembrance to mark the one year anniversary of the event.

== Academics ==
Bluffton offers academic study in more than 90 majors, minors and interdisciplinary programs; and master's degrees in organizational management, business administration, social work, and nutrition and dietetics. Graduate courses in education are offered leading to a master's degree, licensure and endorsements.

Bluffton University holds a certificate of authorization from the Ohio Board of Regents to confer the degrees of Bachelor of Arts, Bachelor of Science, Bachelor of Science in Nursing, Master of Arts in Education, Master of Arts in Organizational Management, Master of Business Administration, Master of Social Work. Bluffton University is accredited by The Higher Learning Commission, a member of the North Central Association.

Students at Bluffton are not proctored during exams. Instead, students are on their honor not to cheat and to report any students who do to the instructor. Students are expected to write the honor pledge (“I am unaware of any inappropriate aid having been given or received during this exam") on their exams and sign their names.

The honor system was created in 1918 by chemistry professor H.W. Berky, who borrowed the idea from his undergraduate education at Princeton University.

== Campus ==
The Bluffton University campus is located on 234 wooded acres in the northwest Ohio village of Bluffton. The village of Bluffton, a Swiss-German community founded in 1861, is a rural community with a population of approximately 4,000. Toledo is an hour north and Dayton is 90 minutes south.

=== Buildings ===
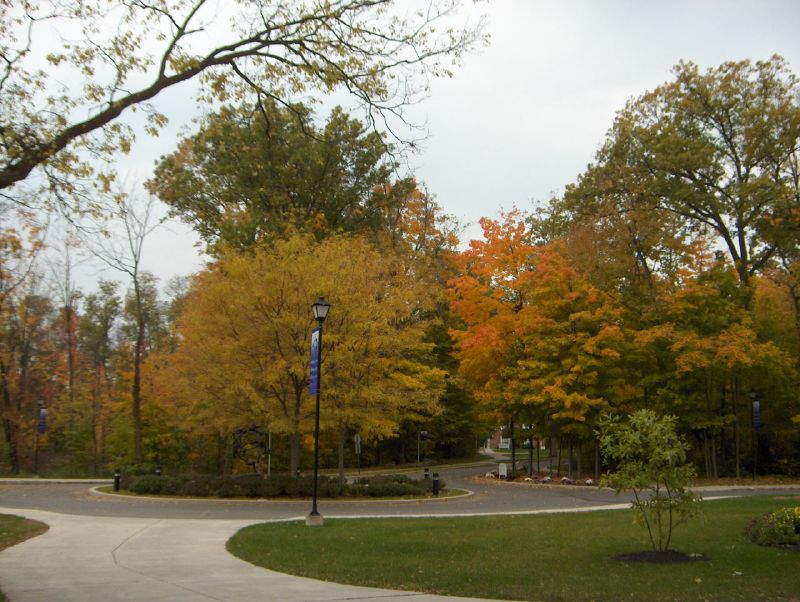
Bluffton University campus

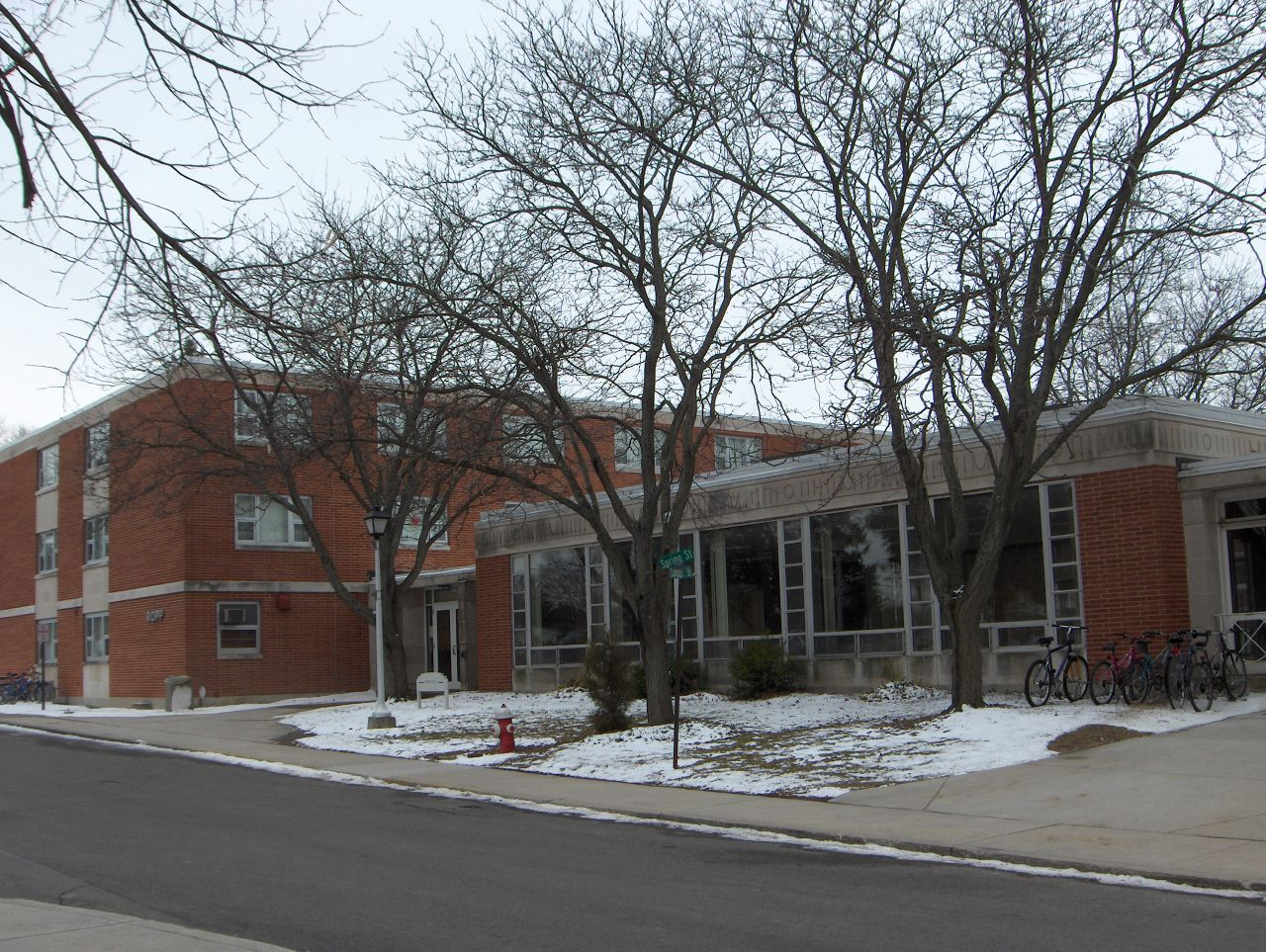
Ropp Hall

- Riley Court
- Sauder Visual Arts Center
- Public Relations House
- Houshower House
- Musselman Library
- College Hall
- Centennial Hall
- Shoker Science Center
- Berky Hall
- Mosiman Hall
- Yoder Recital Hall
- Buildings and Grounds Center
- Founders Hall/Burcky Gym
- Marbeck Center
- Sommer Center

=== Residence halls ===
- Bren-Dell Hall
- Ropp Hall (Old Ropp, Ropp Addition, Ropp Annex)
- Hirschy Hall
- Hirschy Annex
- Ramseyer Hall
- Neufeld Hall
- Riley Court Apartments

== Athletics ==
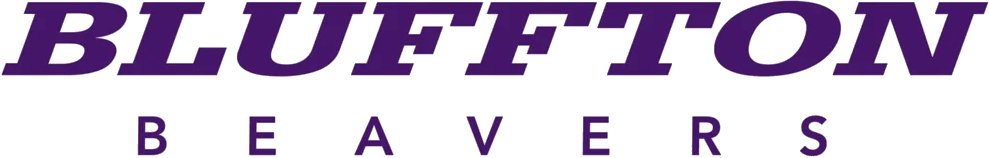
Bluffton Beavers wordmark

The Bluffton athletics team are nicknamed the Beavers. The university is a member of NCAA Division III and the Heartland Collegiate Athletic Conference. Its sports teams are nicknamed the Beavers, and the school colors are Bluffton purple and white. The school fields 16 athletic teams: eight men's teams and eight women's teams.

Men's teams: baseball, basketball, cross country, football, golf, soccer, indoor and outdoor track & field

Women's teams: basketball, cross country, golf, soccer, softball, indoor and outdoor track & field, volleyball

The Bluffton University mascots are a male and female beaver named J Denny and Jenny Beaver. J Denny was introduced in 2010 to honor Dr. J Denny Weaver, a professor of religion and a longtime faculty athletics representative at Bluffton. In the fall of 2014, Jenny joined the campus to help spread school spirit. Each year the university hosts a "Who's in the Suit" event to reveal the identities of the mascots.

== Notable alumni ==
- Harvey Bauman, medical missionary and founder of Champa Christian Hospital, Champa, India
- Tobias Buckell, author.
- Seth Burkholder, professional football player.
- Phyllis Diller, comedian.
- Hugh Downs, broadcaster.
- Elbert Dubenion, professional football player.
- Judson Laipply, comedian whose Evolution of Dance video is one of the most viewed videos on YouTube.
- Paul Soldner, ceramic artist.
- Jeff Timmons, member of the boy band 98 Degrees, attended Bluffton during the fall 1991 quarter and was a member of the football team.
- Baldemar Velasquez, founder and president of the Farm Labor Organizing Committee and a 1989 MacArthur Fellow, received a BA in sociology from Bluffton in 1969 and an honorary doctorate in 1999.
