= William S. Forbes =

American physician

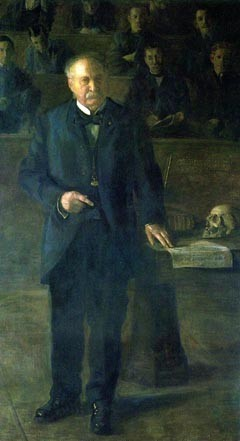
Portrait of William S. Forbes by Thomas Eakins

William Smith Forbes (10 February 1831 – 17 December 1905) was an American physician who served as demonstrator of anatomy at Jefferson Medical College. He is known as the "Father of the Anatomical Act" in Pennsylvania.

== Biography ==
Forbes was born in Falmouth, Stafford County, Virginia, on February 10, 1831. He attended Jefferson Medical College in Philadelphia, Pennsylvania, graduating in 1852. After graduation he was a resident physician at Pennsylvania Hospital from 1853 to 1855. By then the Crimean War was raging, and after completing his residency he promptly sailed for Ottoman Turkey to assist the British and to expand his medical knowledge. He served as a volunteer surgeon at the English Military Hospital in Scutari, Constantinople, and among his colleagues was the famous nurse Florence Nightingale. By Sept. 1856, he was back in Philadelphia, where he settled permanently and in 1857, opened the College Avenue Anatomical School. He married Celanire Bournidi Sims (July 24, 1837 – May 18, 1909) in Havertown, Delaware County, Pennsylvania, on November 3, 1859.

In 1862 he joined the Union army as a surgeon, and early in 1863 he was appointed Surgeon of Volunteers with the rank of major. He reported for duty at General Grant's headquarters at Young's Point, La., on April 5, 1863, as the Vicksburg campaign was entering a critical phase. Forbes was promptly assigned the post of medical director of the 13th Army Corps commanded by Major General John A. McClernand. For the next five months, he had frequent contacts with General Grant, all of which became material for the valuable article which he later published, Recollections of General Grant During the Siege of Vicksburg.

Looking back on the service of Forbes as a surgeon in the Union army, we may contrast the service of his older brothers Francis and James in the Confederate army. This marks an extremely rare example of Washington-descended brothers fighting on opposing sides in the Civil War. His older brother, James Fitzgerald Forbes, while serving as an aide to General A. P. Hill, CSA, was mortally wounded at Chancellorsville in the same volley of friendly fire that mortally wounded General Thomas J. Stonewall Jackson. His younger brother, Alfred Thornton Forbes, was twice wounded but survived the war. Both served in the 9th Virginia Cavalry Regiment.

After the war, Forbes resumed his career as an eminent physician in Philadelphia, where he was demonstrator of anatomy at Jefferson Medical College and senior surgeon at Episcopal Hospital. He achieved a certain notoriety from a strange chain of events. During the dead of night on December 4, 1882, the superintendent of the Lebanon Cemetery in Philadelphia, together with three accomplices, was arrested by police as they were furtively digging up a corpse in the cemetery. On December 5, they were arraigned and formally charged with grave-robbing. Public feelings ran so high on that occasion that a large mob assembled and threatened to lynch the graveyard ghouls. A subsequent police investigation led to charges that the miscreants now under arrest were actually working for none other than Dr. Forbes. He was arrested circa December 15, 1882, and bail was set at $5,000.

On March 13, 1883, Forbes went on trial for conspiracy in the grave-robbing charge. He explained that the public demanded that physicians have a thorough knowledge of anatomy and through public laws the courts used malpractice charges to punish those physicians who were deficient. At the same time, strict laws made it impossible for medical students in anatomy courses to obtain legal cadavers in the numbers required. This inevitably gave rise to medical schools paying professional grave robbers or resurrectionists to provide bodies to medical schools under a kind of don't ask/don't tell policy.

Forbes, who never had any direct dealing with the resurrectionists, was acquitted of conspiracy, and the unpleasant controversy had a salutary effect. A new law, incorporating amendments authored by Forbes, was finally passed by the Pennsylvania legislature in June 1883. The result was a state board to regulate and deal with the problem. Within four years, Forbes was promoted to the post of professor of anatomy and placed in charge of the General Surgical Clinic at Jefferson College. There he continued to teach anatomy and surgery for more than fifteen years. He died in Philadelphia, Pennsylvania, December 17, 1905.

Forbes also brought suit against the executors of the estate of Robert Lenox Kennedy to recover $5,000 after he accompanied Kennedy to Europe as his physician, where the family said it was as a friend. The New York Supreme court sided with the Kennedy family.

Forbes is the subject of the 1905 painting Portrait of Professor William S. Forbes by Thomas Eakins.
