= Pennsylvania Patient Safety Authority =

Government agency

The Pennsylvania Patient Safety Authority is an independent state agency located in Harrisburg, Pennsylvania, United States. Its mission is to improve the quality of healthcare in Pennsylvania by collecting and analyzing patient safety information, developing solutions to patient safety issues, and sharing this information through education and collaboration. Its vision is safe healthcare for all patients. The Authority was established under Act 13 of 2002, the Medical Care Availability and Reduction of Error (MCARE) Act. The Authority began collecting Serious Events (events that harm the patient) and Incidents (near misses) in June 2004, making Pennsylvania the only state in the United States to require reporting of both of the aforementioned event types. Acute healthcare facilities that report events through the Authority include hospitals, ambulatory surgical facilities, birthing centers, and abortion facilities. In June 2009, the Authority began collecting infection reports from nursing homes.

From 2004 through 2017, acute healthcare facilities have reported more than 3 million events; and from 2009 through 2017, nursing homes have reported more than 259,000 events.

The Authority is charged to take steps to reduce and eliminate such events through the identification of problems evident in the collected data and recommendation of solutions that promote patient safety. Efforts to improve patient safety in Pennsylvania include patient safety liaisons providing education on a facility-by-facility basis, in-depth education programs, collaborative improvement projects with Pennsylvania healthcare facilities, and the Pennsylvania Patient Safety Advisory. The Advisory, a quarterly publication, chronicles events reported to the Authority, “especially those associated with a high combination of frequency, severity, and possibility of solution; novel problems and solutions; and problems in which urgent communication of information could have a significant impact on patient outcomes.”

The Authority received the 2006 John M. Eisenberg Award for advancing patient safety and quality in the Commonwealth, presented by both the Joint Commission and the National Quality Forum. In addition, the Authority received a Cheers Award in 2010 from the Institute for Safe Medication Practices for its educational efforts in preventing medication errors and adverse drug events.
