= Institute for Safe Medication Practices =

Nonprofit organization

- Company type: 501(c)(3) nonprofit organization
- Founded: 1975
- Founder: Michael R. Cohen
- Headquarters: United States
- Website: www.ismp.org

The Institute for Safe Medication Practices (ISMP) is an American 501(c)(3) organization focusing on the prevention of medication errors and promoting safe medication practices. It is affiliated with ECRI.

== Activities ==
Among others, ISMP maintains and disseminates a list of "do not crush" medications, as well as clinical best practices. The ISMP's Medication Safety Self-Assessment tool has been used in surveys of medication safety in hospitals in the United States and elsewhere.

The ISMP frequently investigates and reports on medication errors that have occurred in practice. These investigations are often published in the peer-reviewed journal Hospital Pharmacy.
