= Soldier's Heart (novel) =

1998 novella by Gary Paulsen

- Author: Gary Paulsen
- Language: English
- Genre: Historical War novel Civil War novel
- Publisher: Delacorte Books
- Publication date: September 8, 1998
- Publication place: United States
- Media type: Print
- Pages: 128 (hardback); 106 (paperback)
- ISBN: 0-385-32498-7
- OCLC: 38249375
- LC Class: PZ7.P2843 So 1998

Soldier's Heart: Being the Story of the Enlistment and Due Service of the Boy Charley Goddard in the First Minnesota Volunteers is a historical war novella by Gary Paulsen aimed at the teenage market. It was published September 8, 1998 by Delacorte Books.

Soldier's Heart is a fictionalization of the true story of a Minnesotan farm boy, Charley Goddard, who at the age of 15 enlisted in the Union Army during the American Civil War. Charley lied about his age to join the First Volunteers of Minnesota and was involved in combat at Bull Run and Gettysburg. He returned home traumatized and suffering from "soldier's heart" (Da Costa's syndrome). Although some events and time sequences are not completely factual, the essential elements of the book's story are true. Charley did not fight in the “Bull Run” in reality.

== Plot ==
It begins with a 15-year-old named Charley Goddard's Minnesota hometown. Residents are talking about what they think will be a "shooting war." The atmosphere at the town meetings is festive with flags, drums, and patriotic speeches. Everyone assumes that the North will win easily and that the fighting is unlikely to last more than a month or two. As a volunteer army is beginning to form, Charley decides to join, despite his mother's objections. Charley lies about his age and joins the Minnesota Volunteers in what he thinks will be a fun experience that will make him a man. The pay is eleven dollars a month, much more than he makes working on the farms.

Charley trains and learns to be a soldier, finding the experience much different from what he had imagined. Upon leaving the camp, the men are treated as heroes even before they leave town, accompanied by cheering and flag-waving. On the train ride to their new camp, Charley meets a slave, who thanks him for what he is doing for the southern slaves.

In Charley's first battle, near Manassas Junction, Virginia, in 1861, he is caught in the middle of violent suffering and death. When the battle is over, hundreds of Charley's comrades have been killed in what came to be called the Battle of Bull Run after the name of the creek that ran nearby, or the Battle of Manassas for the junction nearby.

A camp of 90,000 men is created near Washington, D.C. Charley becomes part of the day-to-day routine of the camp. He and the others forage for food at local farms and eventually build log houses to live in during the approaching winter. However, many men get diseases such as dysentery and die in the camp. Charlie also gets dysentery, but recovers. During this period, Charley participates in the battle against the Confederate Army. The Union wins, but with heavy casualties, one of whom is Nelson, a man whom Charley had befriended only hours before. Nelson, shot in the stomach, knows that the surgeons do not have the skills or time to mend his wound, so he shoots himself with his own rifle on the battlefield.

Charley takes part in a winter battle near Richmond, Virginia, in which nearly one hundred Confederate Army cavalry charge the six hundred infantrymen of Charley's regiment. Charley and the others are told to shoot the horses in order to defeat the cavalry, and they do so, killing every horse and man. He then fights a large army of Confederate soldiers. After the fighting is over, he is told that he has been shot in the shoulder; when he arrives at the temporary hospital, he is told that the blood on his uniform is not his and that he has not been shot.

Next, Charley participates in the Battle of Gettysburg, in July 1863. In this battle, he has the protection of rocks and logs and a large force of artillery behind him. Most of the charging Confederate soldiers are killed as they attack, but some eventually get close. The officers send the First Minnesota Volunteers forward. They rush at the soldiers, killing many. Charley is knocked out by enemy blows, seeing a red veil come down over his eyes and believing that he is about to die.

The story skips ahead a few years in Charley's life. At age 21, Charley claims that he has become old at heart, waiting for death, his only escape. The violent killings have numbed him. He says that he should marry and raise children, but he knows that he is not well enough to do so. He limps down to the river for a picnic of roast beef and cold coffee near the river. He admires a Confederate pistol, imagining committing suicide with it. He takes out cheese and bread and admires the river, thinking of all the pretty things in his life.

=== Author's note ===
In an author's note, Paulsen explains that in the Battle of Gettysburg, the First Minnesota Volunteers' 262 men charged down Cemetery Ridge toward a force several times larger, after which only 47 men were left standing of the initial 1,000 in the regiment. Charley was hit severely, was found, and was treated by the army surgeons. He fought at later actions, but neither his wounds nor his mental anguish healed properly. After the war, he tried in vain to hold jobs. He ran for county clerk based on his war record and was elected, but before he could serve, he died from his wounds in December 1868; he was only 23 years old when he died.

== Reception ==
Soldier's Heart was well received by critics, including starred reviews from Booklist, Kirkus Reviews, and Publishers Weekly.

Booklist named Soldier's Heart the best youth nonfiction book of 1998. The following year, the Young Adult Library Services Association included Soldier's Heart on their list of Quick Picks for Reluctant Young Adult Readers, as well as their list of Best Books for Young Adults.
