= Thomas Jefferson University =

Private university in Philadelphia, Pennsylvania, US

- Former names: Medical Department of Jefferson College in Philadelphia (1824–1838); Jefferson Medical College (1838–1969); Philadelphia Textile School (1884–1942); Philadelphia Textile Institute (1942–1961); Philadelphia College of Textiles & Science (1961–1999); Philadelphia University (1999–2017)
- Motto: "Redefining humanly possible"
- Type: Private research university
- Established: 1824; 202 years ago
- Accreditation: MSCHE
- Endowment: $1.533 billion (2021)
- President: Susan C. Aldridge
- Provost: Matt Dane Baker
- Students: 7,831
- Undergraduates: 3,665
- Postgraduates: 4,361
- Location: Philadelphia, Pennsylvania, United States; 40°1′21″N 75°11′33″W
- Campus: 104 acres (0.42 km^{2}); Large city
- Colors: Deep blue and bright blue
- Nickname: Rams
- Sporting affiliations: NCAA Division II – CACC
- Mascot: Phil the Ram
- Website: jefferson.edu

Thomas Jefferson University is a private research university in Philadelphia, Pennsylvania, United States. Established in its earliest form in 1824, the university officially combined with Philadelphia University in 2017. The university is named for U.S. Founding Father and president Thomas Jefferson. It is classified among "R2: Doctoral Universities – High research activity".

To signify its heritage, the university sometimes carries the nomenclature Jefferson (Philadelphia University + Thomas Jefferson University) in its branding.

== History ==
=== Philadelphia University ===
Philadelphia University was originally known as "Philadelphia Textile School" when it was founded in 1884, and then "Philadelphia Textile Institute" for 20 years (1942–1961), "Philadelphia College of Textiles & Science" for 38 years (1962–1999), and Philadelphia University for 18 years (1999–2017), its final name before merging with Thomas Jefferson University. At the 1876 Centennial Exposition, local textile manufacturers noticed that Philadelphia's textile industry was falling behind its rivals' capacity, technology, and ability. In 1880, they formed the Philadelphia Association of Manufacturers of Textile Fabrics, with Theodore C. Search as its president, to fight for higher tariffs on imported textiles and to educate local textile leaders. Search joined the board of directors of the Philadelphia Museum and School of Industrial Art (now the Philadelphia Museum of Art and formerly the University of the Arts which has since dissolved), thinking it the perfect partner for his plans for a school, and began fundraising in 1882.

In early 1884, Search himself taught the first classes of the Philadelphia Textile School to five students at 1336 Spring Garden Street. The school was officially opened on November 5, 1884. The school moved to 1303-1307 Buttonwood Street in 1891, then moved again in 1893.

Enrollment had been growing steadily and the school was turning away "bright young fellows" for lack of space. The school acquired the former Philadelphia Institute of the Deaf and Dumb on the corner of Broad and Spruce Streets, which allowed rapid expansion of academic offerings and capacity of students.

In 1942, the school was granted the right to award baccalaureate degrees and changed its name to the Philadelphia Textile Institute (PTI). In 1949, having decided to break its ties with the museum, PTI moved to its present site in the East Falls section of Philadelphia.

In 1961, the school changed its name again, to Philadelphia College of Textiles & Science, but was still known as Philadelphia Textile for short. The university's student population doubled between 1954 and 1964, and doubled again by 1978, with programs in the arts, sciences, and business administration being introduced. The college purchased an adjoining property in 1972, doubling the size of its campus. In 1976, it offered its first graduate degree, the Master of Business Administration. The purchase of additional properties in East Falls in 1980 and 1988 nearly doubled the campus again, adding classrooms, research laboratories, student residences, and athletic facilities. In 1992, the 54,000-square-foot (5,000 m^{2}) Paul J. Gutman Library opened.

During the 1990s, the college began to offer undergraduate majors in a wider range of fields, resulting in the college being granted university status by the Commonwealth of Pennsylvania in 1999. The board of trustees voted to change the college's name to Philadelphia University, on July 13, 1999. The school preferred the longer abbreviation of "PhilaU", rather than the simple two-letter abbreviation of "PU", due to the latter's oft-mocked connection with other "PU"-abbreviated schools as an onomatopoetic term for body odor.

=== Thomas Jefferson University ===
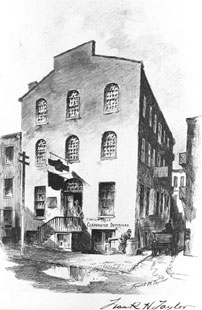
The Tivoli Theater in Philadelphia, the first home of the Jefferson Medical College, c. 1824–28

Thomas Jefferson University began as a medical school. During the early 19th century, several attempts to create a second medical school in Philadelphia had been stymied, largely by University of Pennsylvania School of Medicine alumni. In an attempt to circumvent that opposition, a group of Philadelphia physicians led by George McClellan sent an 1824 letter to the trustees of Jefferson College (now Washington & Jefferson College) in Canonsburg, Pennsylvania, asking them to establish a medical department in Philadelphia. The trustees agreed, establishing the "Medical Department of Jefferson College in Philadelphia" in 1825. In response to a second request, the Pennsylvania General Assembly granted an expansion of Jefferson College's charter in 1826, endorsing the creation of the new department and allowing it to grant medical degrees. An additional 10 Jefferson College trustees, including Joel Barlow Sutherland, were appointed to supervise the new facility from Philadelphia, owing to the difficulty of managing a medical department on the other side of the state. Two years later, this second board was granted authority to manage the Medical Department, while the Jefferson College trustees maintained veto power for major decisions.

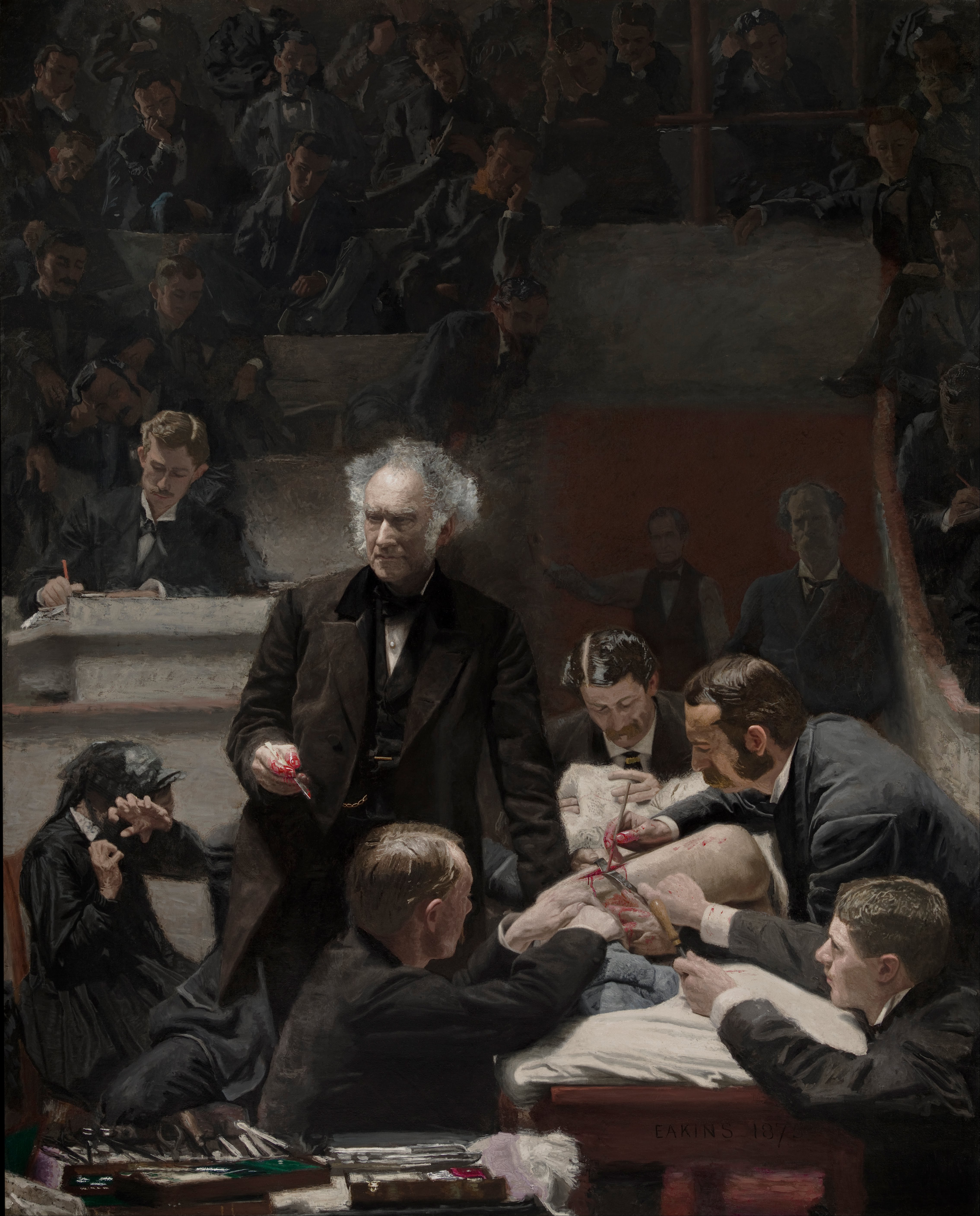
Thomas Eakins' painting The Gross Clinic, housed at Jefferson University from 1876 to 2006

The first class was graduated in 1826, receiving their degrees only after the disposition of a lawsuit seeking to close the school. The first classes were held in the Tivoli Theater on Prune Street in Philadelphia, which had the first medical clinic attached to a medical school. Owing to the teaching philosophy of Dr. McClellan, classes focused on clinical practice. In 1828, the Medical Department moved to the Ely Building, which allowed for a large lecture space and the "Pit," a 700-seat amphitheater to allow students to view surgeries. This building had an attached hospital, the second such medical school/hospital arrangement in the nation, servicing 441 inpatients and 4,659 outpatients in its first year of operation. The relationship with Jefferson College survived until 1838, when the Medical Department received a separate charter, allowing it to operate separately as the "Jefferson Medical College". At this time, all instructors, including McClellan, were vacated from the school and the trustees hired all new individuals to teach. This has been considered the time at which the school came to be considered a "legitimate" medical school.

In 1841, Jefferson Medical College hired what would be dubbed "The Faculty of '41", an influential collection of professors including Charles Delucena Meigs and Mütter Museum founder Thomas Dent Mütter. This collection of professors would institute numerous changes to Jefferson—including providing patient beds over a shop at 10th and Sansom Streets in 1844—and the staff would remain unchanged for 15 years. The graduating class of 1849 included a son of college founder Joel Barlow Sutherland, Charles Sutherland, who went on to serve as Surgeon General of the United States Army.

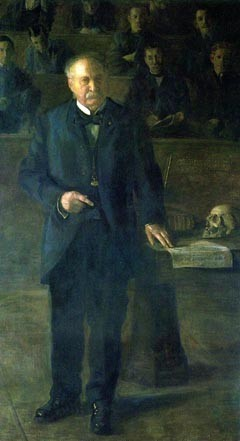
Portrait of William S. Forbes by Thomas Eakins

In 1882, a Philadelphia Press newspaper story sparked a sensational trial after a journalist caught body snatchers stealing corpses and providing them to Jefferson Medical College for use as cadavers by medical students. Four grave robbers were arrested and sentenced to Moyamensing Prison for stealing bodies and selling them to Jefferson Medical College at the rate of $8 a body. After the arrests, it was determined that the body snatching had been going on for nine years and several hundred corpses had been sold to Jefferson Medical College.

The renowned surgeon and Jefferson Medical College anatomy professor, William S. Forbes, was arrested for his role in the grave robbery but was acquitted Forbes helped write the 1867 Pennsylvania Law named the "Anatomy Act" which called for hospitals, prisons and mental health wards to provide the bodies of those that had no family or funds for burial to medical schools for anatomical research.

Due in part to the Lebanon Cemetery grave robbery scandal, the Pennsylvania Anatomy Act of 1883 was passed which provided for legal means by which medical colleges could obtain cadavers without having to buy them from grave robbers.

A 125-bed hospital, one of the first in the nation affiliated with a medical school, opened in 1877, and a school for nurses began in 1891. The Medical College became Thomas Jefferson University on July 1, 1969. As an academic health care center, Jefferson is currently involved in education, medical research, and patient care. Jefferson Medical College is the 9th oldest American medical school that is in existence today.

In January 2007, the university sold Thomas Eakins' painting The Gross Clinic, which depicts a surgery that took place at the school, for $68 million, to the Pennsylvania Academy of the Fine Arts, in association with the Philadelphia Museum of Art. A reproduction hangs in its place at Jefferson University.

On June 17, 2014, Sidney Kimmel Foundation donated $110 million to Jefferson Medical College, prompting the announcement that Jefferson Medical College would be renamed Sidney Kimmel Medical College. It was the largest donation received in its history.

=== Merger ===
In May 2017, Thomas Jefferson University and Philadelphia University announced that they would merge under the name Thomas Jefferson University.

=== Affiliations ===
Latrobe Hospital, as well as other hospitals, are affiliated with the Jefferson Medical College.

== Academics ==
Academic rankings

National
- U.S. News & World Report: 127
- Washington Monthly: 88
- WSJ/College Pulse: 135

Global
- ARWU: 501–600
- U.S. News & World Report: 390

National Program Rankings
Program	Ranking
Biological Sciences	130
Engineering	Unranked
Medicine: Primary Care	59
Medicine: Research	55
Nursing: Anesthesia	100
Nursing: Midwifery	17
Nursing: Master's	90
Nursing: Doctor of Nursing Practice	100
Occupational Therapy	6
Pharmacy	53
Physical Therapy	49
Physician Assistant	74
Public Health	82

Global Program Rankings
Program	Ranking
Biology and Biochemistry	372
Cardiac and Cardiovascular Systems	110
Cell Biology	106
Clinical Medicine	128
Molecular Biology and Genetics	221
Neuroscience and Behavior	173
Oncology	74
Radiology, Nuclear Medicine and Medical Imaging	124
Surgery	48

Jefferson offers 160+ undergraduate and graduate programs, including the Sidney Kimmel Medical College and former Philadelphia University's flagship colleges:

- College of Architecture and the Built Environment
- Kanbar College of Design, Engineering and Commerce
- School of Continuing and Professional Studies

== Campus ==
There are two campuses and a research center.

=== East Falls ===
The university's East Falls 100-acre (40 ha) wooded campus is located about eight miles northwest of Center City, Philadelphia, accessible by two of SEPTA's Regional Rail lines. The campus consists of 52 buildings, including classrooms, laboratories, studios, the Paul J. Gutman Library, student resident facilities, an exhibition gallery, and some major additions early in the 21st Century, the 72,000-square-foot (6,700 m^{2}) Kanbar Campus Center for students, faculty and staff; the Gallagher Athletic, Recreation and Convocation Center; the SEED Center (certified LEED Gold Center for Sustainability, Energy Efficiency and Design), and the innovative DEC Center. A subsidiary campus is located in Bucks County.

=== Center City ===
The university's Center City Philadelphia campus, medical offices, and hospital (called Jefferson Health) are headquartered at 130 South Ninth Street and surrounding city blocks.

=== Manayunk Research Center ===
In addition to its major properties, Jefferson runs the Philadelphia University Research Center, which is housed in a restored textile mill (originally opened in 1864) in the Manayunk section of Philadelphia, just south of the main campus. The research center contains both the Engineering and Design Institute and the Laboratory for Engineered Human Protection.

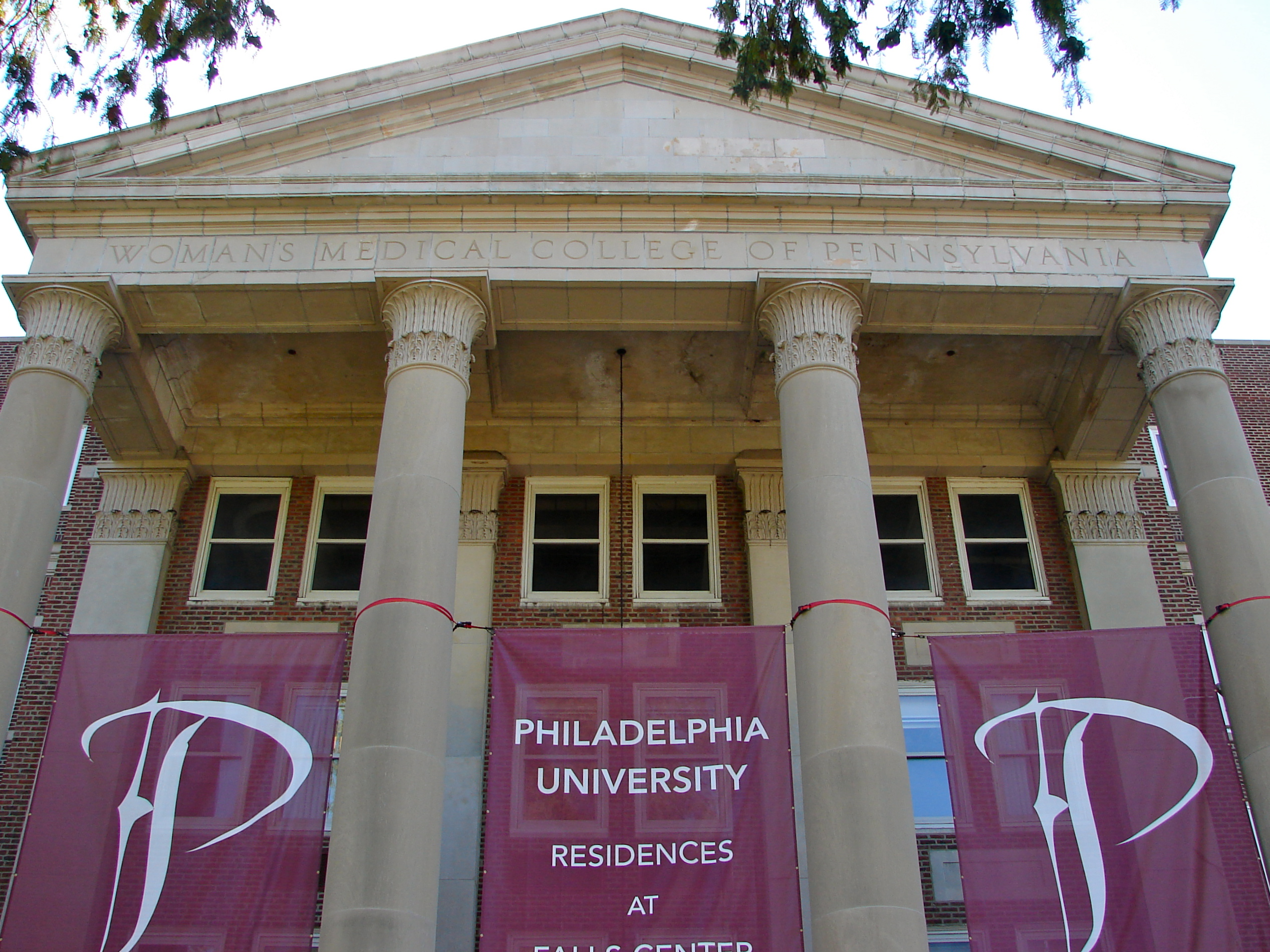
Woman's Medical College of Pennsylvania

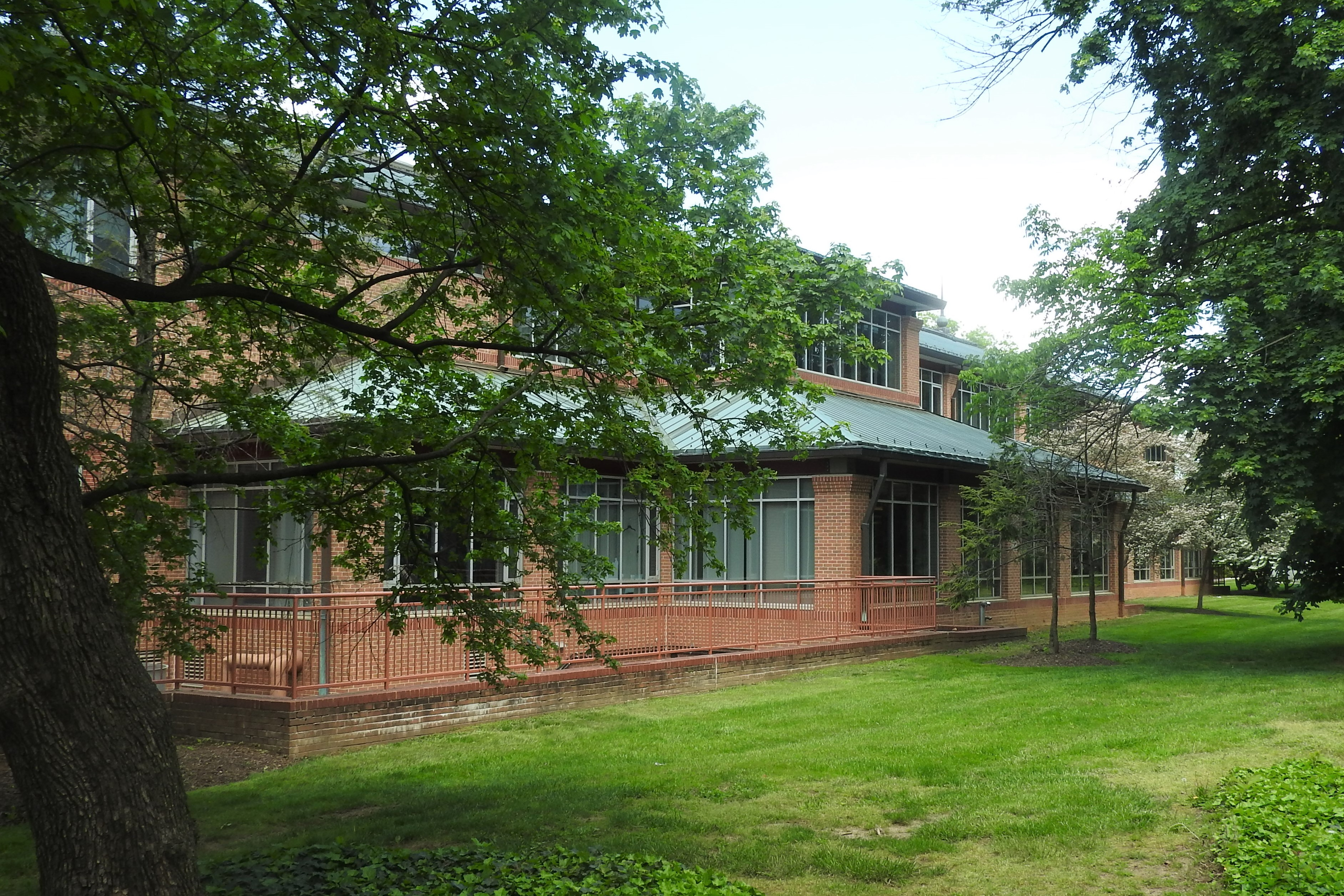
Paul J. Gutman Library

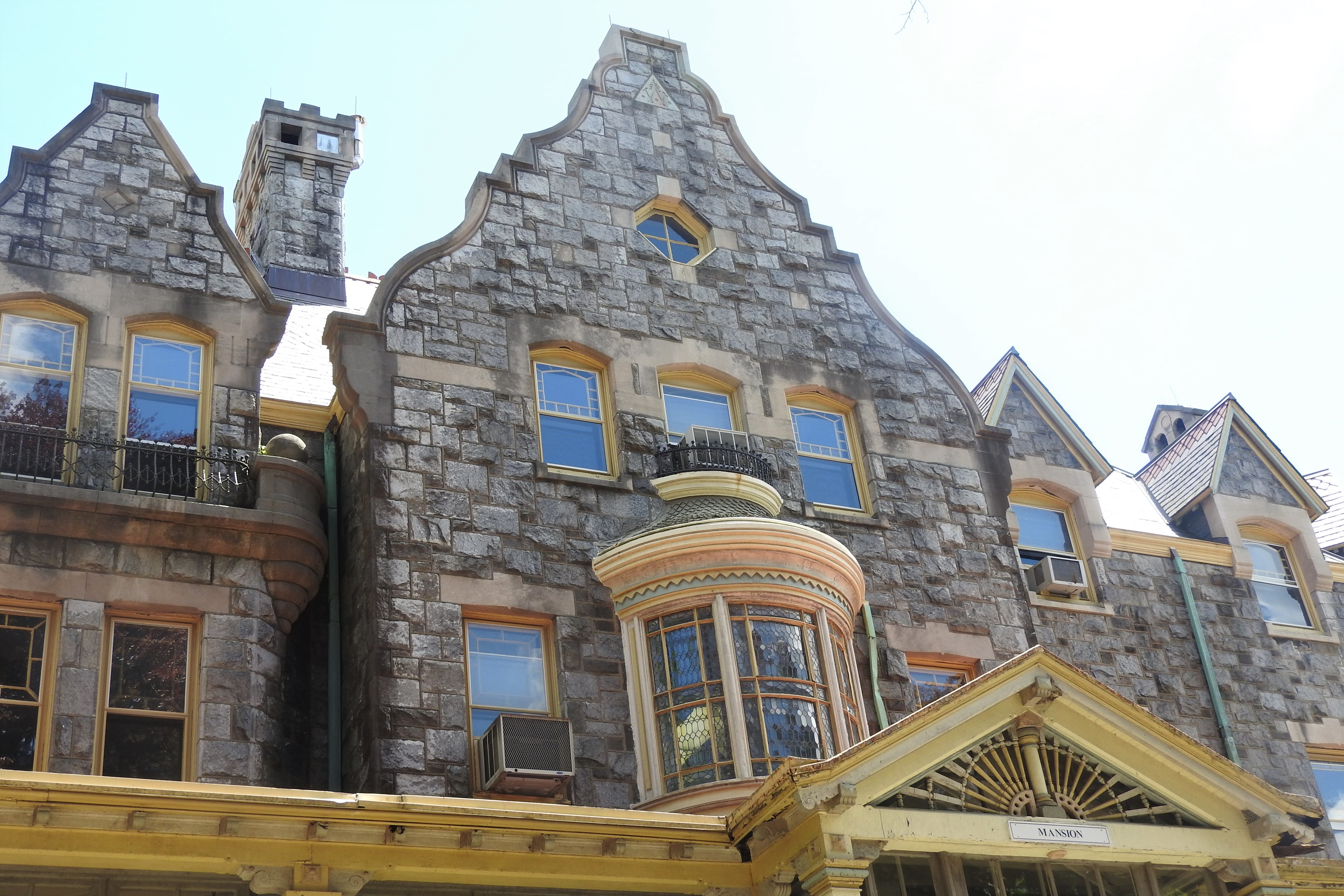
The Mansion on the East Falls

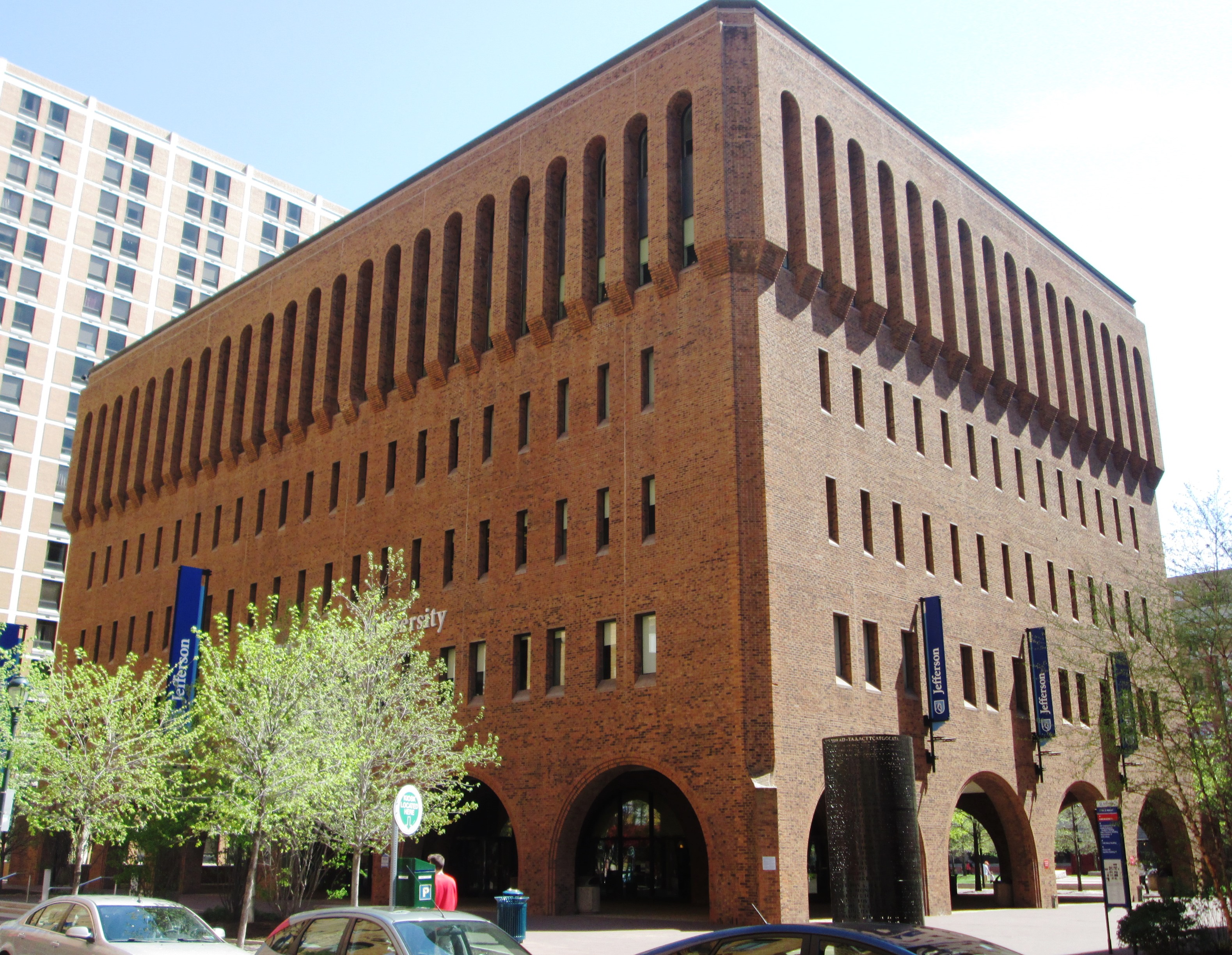
Scott Memorial Library

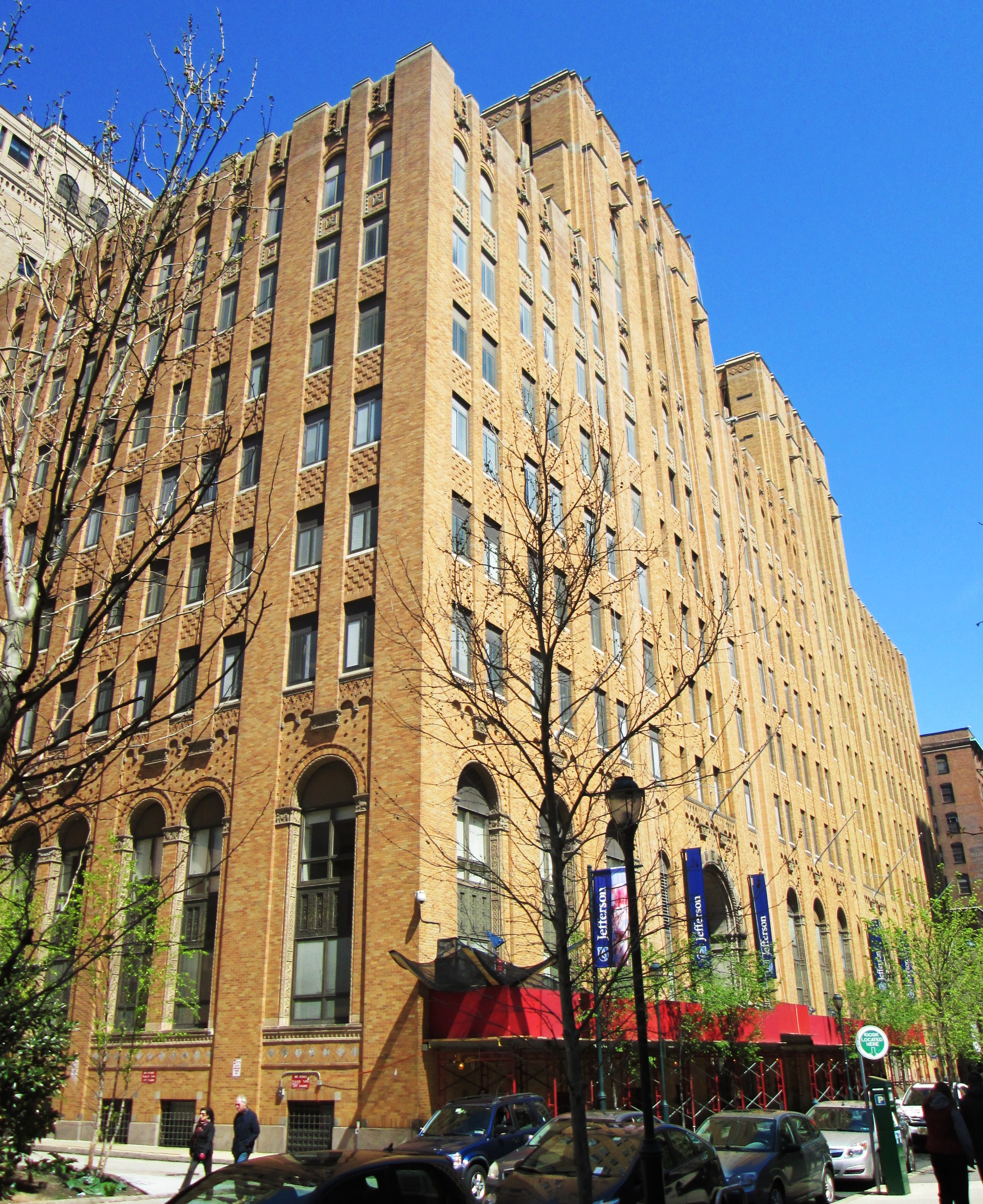
The College and Curtis Buildings

== Athletics ==
Jefferson athletics wordmark

Jefferson's athletic teams are called the Rams. The merged university inherited Philadelphia University's athletic legacy.

Jefferson is a member of NCAA Division II, primarily competing as a member of the Central Atlantic Collegiate Conference (CACC) since the 2005–06 academic year; while its women's golf and women's rowing teams compete as Independents. The Rams previously competed in the East Coast Conference (originally known as the New York Collegiate Athletic Conference until 2006) from 1991–92 to 2004–05.

Jefferson sponsors 17 varsity intercollegiate teams: Men's sports include baseball, basketball, cross country, golf, soccer, tennis and track & field; while women's sports include basketball, cross country, golf, lacrosse, rowing, soccer, softball, tennis, track & field and volleyball.

The merged school chose to retain PhilaU's nickname, and the athletic program follows the overall institution in using the branding of "Jefferson" when describing the university as a whole.

== Notable alumni ==
- James P. Bagian (M.D. 1977), physician, engineer, and former NASA astronaut.
- Harvey Bauman (M.D. 1923), physician, medical missionary, founder of Champa General Hospital (1826), Champa, India
- David Bernstein, architect
- Adrian Brooks (BSBA 1978, Philadelphia Textile), former professional soccer player.
- Pat Chambers, Florida Gulf Coast University men's basketball coach.
- Shahzada Dawood (M.S. 2000), Pakistani businessman and philanthropist, who disappeared aboard the Titan submersible in 2023.
- Jacob Mendes Da Costa (M.D. 1852), discoverer of Da Costa's syndrome.
- Anthony F. DePalma (M.D. 1929), orthopedic surgeon and Jefferson professor
- Joseph T. English (M.D. 1958), chief psychiatrist of the United States Peace Corps, administrator of the Health Services and Mental Health Administration in the United States Department of Health, Education, and Welfare, and the founding president of the New York City Health and Hospitals Corporation (HHC)
- Bob File, ex-Major League Baseball player, Toronto Blue Jays.
- Carlos Finlay (M.D. 1855), pioneer in the research of yellow fever, determining that it was transmitted through Aedes aegypti.
- William S. Forbes, professor of anatomy.
- John Heysham Gibbon, inventor of the heart-lung machine; awarded the Lasker Prize.
- Robert Gallo, discoverer of the Human Immunodeficiency Virus; awarded the Lasker Prize twice.
- Kermit Gosnell, abortion provider and convicted murderer.
- Samuel D. Gross (M.D. 1828), academic trauma surgeon; referred to as "The Emperor of American Surgery".
- Malcolm C. Grow, first Surgeon General of the United States Air Force.
- Frederick W. Hatch (M.D. 1873), psychiatrist, General Superintendent of State Hospitals in California
- Chevalier Jackson, physician and pioneer in laryngology
- Sumner Jackson, medical doctor and member of the French Resistance in World War II
- Maurice Kanbar (1952, H 2003), inventor and philanthropist
- Herbert Kleber, psychiatrist and substance abuse researcher
- William Williams Keen, first neurosurgeon to successfully remove a brain tumor
- Curtis King, ex-Major League Baseball player, St. Louis Cardinals
- Howard Krein, physician, surgeon, venture capitalist
- Robert G. Lahita, physician, internist and rheumatologist, best known for research into systemic lupus erythematosus and other autoimmune diseases
- Fred D. Lublin, neurologist, medical researcher and multiple sclerosis expert
- Herb Magee, head coach of the Jefferson men's basketball team.
- Marty Makary, surgeon, professor, and author.
- Silas Weir Mitchell, father of medical neurology.
- Jay McCarroll, winner of Bravo's inaugural season of Project Runway.
- Robert Charles Moon, ophthalmologist and publisher of books for the blind using Moon type
- David L. Reich (1982), academic anesthesiologist and professor; president and COO of the Mount Sinai Hospital, and president of Mount Sinai Queens
- Charles E. de M. Sajous (1878), pioneer of endocrinology
- Richard Smeyne, neuroscientist
- Jacob da Silva Solis-Cohen, performed the first laryngotomy for vocal cord cancer.
- Stanton N. Smullens – vascular surgeon, former Chief Medical Officer of the Jefferson Health System, and founding CEO of JeffCare.
- Benjamin Starnes, vascular surgeon, medical researcher, and Alexander Whitehill Clowes Endowed Chair in Vascular surgery at the University of Washington
- John P. Turner, surgeon, hospital administrator, and educator
- Edward John Wherry III (Ph.D. 2000) immunologist and professor
- Greg Wilson, former coach of Rams' men's soccer, and professional player.
- Charles E. Woodruff, (arts degree, circa 1880s), surgeon, environmental health official, writer
- Vincent Wolanin, athlete, businessman, philanthropist
- Anthony Zacchei, ophthalmologist
