= Agency for Healthcare Research and Quality =

United States government agency

- ARK
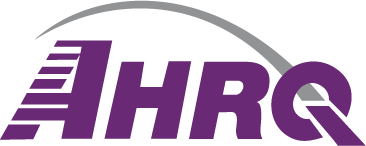
- AHRQ Logo

Agency overview
- Formed: 1989; 37 years ago
- Preceding agencies: National Center for Health Services Research and Development (1968–1973); Bureau of Health Services Research (1973–1975); National Center for Health Services Research (1975–1985); National Center for Health Services Research and Health Care Technology Assessment (1985–1989); Agency for Health Care Policy and Research (1989–1999)
- Jurisdiction: Federal government of the United States
- Headquarters: 5600 Fishers Lane, Rockville, Maryland, U.S.
- Employees: 1,996
- Annual budget: US$ $487 million (2024)
- Agency executives: Roger D. Klein, Director; Mamatha S. Pancholi, Deputy Director for Programs
- Parent department: United States Department of Health and Human Services
- Parent agency: United States Public Health Service
- Website: www.ahrq.gov

The Agency for Healthcare Research and Quality (AHRQ; pronounced "ark" or "A-H-R-Q") is one of twelve agencies within the United States Department of Health and Human Services (HHS). The agency is headquartered in North Bethesda, Maryland, a suburb of Washington, D.C. (with a Rockville mailing address).

AHRQ's earliest predecessor was established in 1968. It was expanded and promoted to an operating agency of the Public Health Service in 1989 as the Agency for Health Care Policy and Research (AHCPR) to enhance the quality, appropriateness, and effectiveness of health care services and access to care by conducting and supporting research, demonstration projects, and evaluations; developing guidelines; and disseminating information on health care services and delivery systems.

== History ==
AHRQ's earliest predecessor was the National Center for Health Services Research and Development, established in 1968 within the short-lived PHS Health Services and Mental Health Administration (HSMHA) during the 1966–1973 PHS reorganizations. It was established largely through the efforts of members of the NIH Division of Research Grants Health Services Study Section. The new center quickly absorbed the PHS Division of Chronic Diseases, which dated back to 1949, in order to access the latter's larger budget.

When HSMHA was split up in 1973, the center was included in one of its successors, the Health Resources Administration. It was renamed the Bureau of Health Services Research that year, and then the National Center for Health Services Research in 1975.

In 1978 it was transferred to the Office of the Assistant Secretary for Health. In 1985 it was renamed the National Center for Health Services Research and Health Care Technology Assessment.

In 1989, the agency became its own operating agency within PHS, and was renamed Agency for Health Care Policy and Research (AHCPR) by the Omnibus Budget Reconciliation Act of 1989 (103 Stat. 2159). However, AHCPR became controversial when it produced several guidelines that some thought would reduce medical drugs and procedures. This included concern from ophthalmologists on a cataract guideline and concern by the pharmaceutical industry over a reduction in the use of new drugs. When the agency produced a guideline that concluded that back pain surgery was unnecessary and potentially harmful, a lobbying campaign aided by Congressmen whose backs had been operated on changed the name of the agency and scaled back the guidelines program, which existed as the National Guideline Clearinghouse, until it was defunded in 2018.

AHCPR was reauthorized December 6, 1999, as the Agency for Healthcare Research and Quality (AHRQ) under the Healthcare Research and Quality Act of 1999, which amended Title IX of the Public Health Service Act (42 U.S.C. 299 et seq).

AHRQ's staff was cut by 75% following cuts by the second Trump administration. Over 100 research grants totaling over $250 million were cancelled by the administration.

== Funding ==
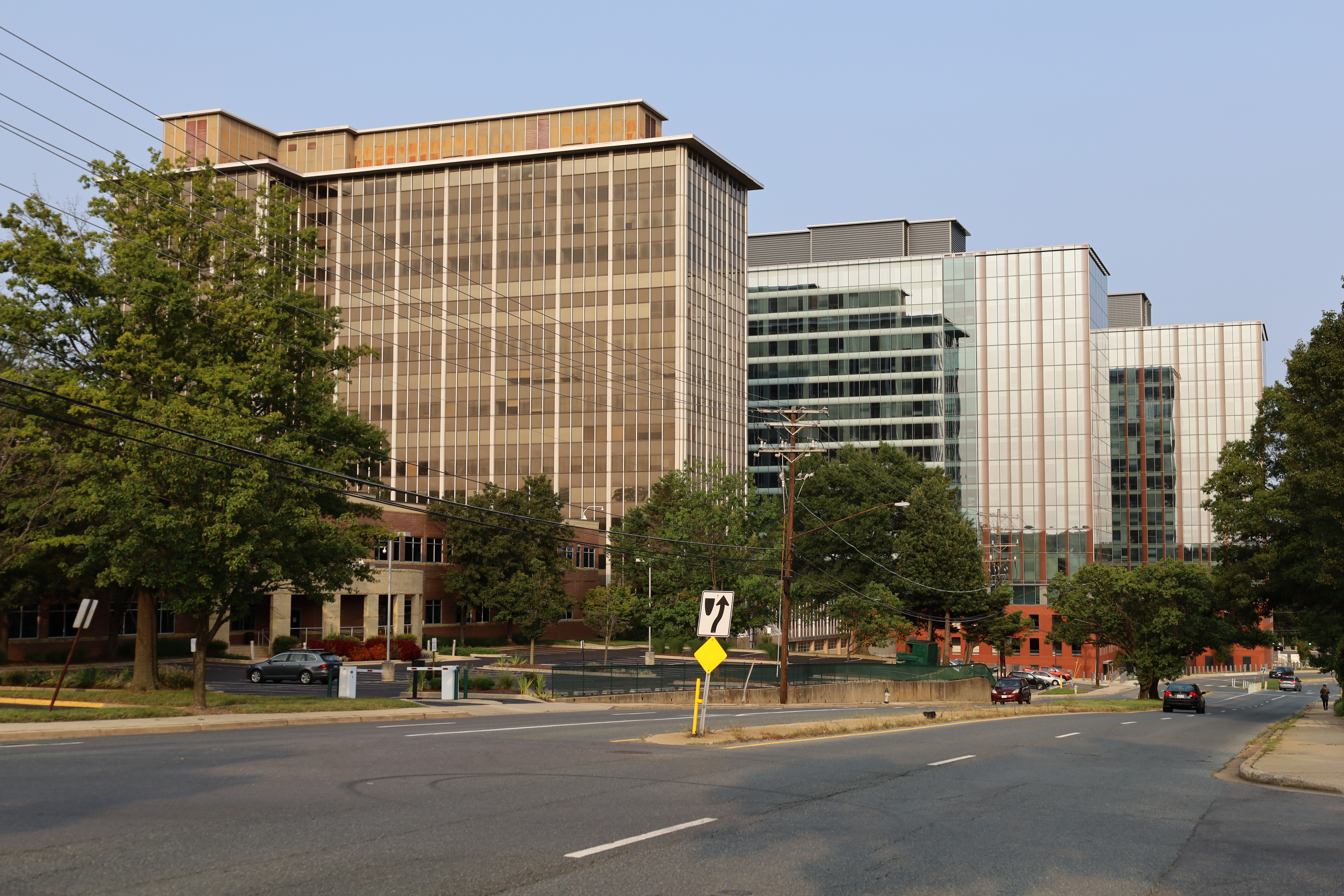
AHRQ headquarters at 5600 Fishers Lane in Rockville, Maryland

The 2015 budget for AHRQ was US$440 million, $24 million less than FY 2014. The budget includes $334 million in Public Health Service (PHS) Evaluation Funds, a decrease of $30 million from FY 2014, and $106 million from the Patient-Centered Outcomes Research Trust Fund, an increase of $13 million above FY 2014.

The FY 2015 budget is intended to ensure the Agency continues its progress on health services research to improve outcomes, affordability, and quality. The budget also supports the collection of information on health care spending and use through the Healthcare Cost and Utilization Project (HCUP) and Medical Expenditure Panel Survey (MEPS).

In July 2018, the National Guideline Clearinghouse (NGC) and the National Quality Measures Clearinghouse (NQMC), two longtime online resources from the AHRQ, were shut down because federal funding ceased to be available to them. Other stakeholders were exploring options for hosting the NGC; should that happen, it will return to the web.

On a continuing resolution, AHRQ’s fiscal year 2025 operating budget is $487 million, the same as fiscal year 2024. AHRQ was appropriated $345 million for the 2026 fiscal year, however as of August 2026, only $15 million in grants had been spent.

== Leadership ==
The following persons served as AHRQ director:

No.	Portrait	Director	Term started	Term ended	Refs.
1		John M. Eisenberg	April 1997	March 10, 2002 (Note: Died in office.)	
acting		Carolyn M. Clancy	March 2002	February 5, 2003	
2		Carolyn M. Clancy	February 5, 2003	August 2013	
3		Richard Kronick	August 2013	March 18, 2016	
acting		Sharon Arnold	March 19, 2016	May 1, 2016	
4		Andrew Bindman	May 2, 2016	January 13, 2017	
acting		Sharon Arnold	January 14, 2017	May 10, 2017	
5		Gopal Khanna	May 11, 2017	January 11, 2021	
acting		David Meyers	January 2021	February 2022	
6		Robert Otto Valdez	February 27, 2022	January 2025	
acting		Mamatha S. Pancholi	January 2025	July 2025	
7		Roger D. Klein	July 2025	present	

Table notes:

== Divisions ==
The Agency has multiple offices and centers including the Center for Evidence and Practice Improvement (CEPI), the Center for Financing, Access and Trends, the Center for Delivery, Organization and Markets, the Center for Quality and Patient Safety, the Office of Management Services, the Office of Extramural Research and Priority Populations, and the Office of Communications. The Office of Communications was previously known as the Office of Communications and Knowledge Transfer.

Within CEPI, the Evidence-Based Practice Centers (EPCs) develop evidence reports and technology assessments on topics relevant to clinical and other health care organization and delivery issues—specifically those that are common, expensive, and/or significant for the Medicare and Medicaid populations. With this program, AHRQ serves as a "science partner" with private and public organizations in their efforts to improve the quality, effectiveness, and appropriateness of health care by synthesizing the evidence and facilitating the translation of evidence-based research findings. Topics are nominated by Federal and non-Federal partners such as professional societies, health plans, insurers, employers, and patient groups.
