= Da Costa's syndrome =

- Other names: Soldier's heart, irritable heart syndrome, neurocirculatory asthenia, cardiac neurosis, chronic asthenia, effort syndrome, functional cardiovascular disease, primary neurasthenia, subacute asthenia
- Specialty: Psychiatry, Cardiology
- Symptoms: fatigue upon exertion, shortness of breath, palpitations, sweating, chest pain

Da Costa's syndrome, also known as soldier's heart among other names, was a syndrome or a set of symptoms similar to those of heart disease. These include fatigue upon exertion, shortness of breath, palpitations, sweating, chest pain, and sometimes orthostatic intolerance. It was originally thought to be a cardiac condition, and treated with a predecessor to modern cardiac drugs. In modern times, it is believed to represent several unrelated disorders, some of which have a known medical basis.

Historically, similar forms of this disorder have been noticed in various wars, like the American Civil War and Crimean war, and among British troops who colonized India. The condition was named after Jacob Mendes Da Costa who investigated and described the disorder in 1871.

== Signs and symptoms ==
Symptoms of Da Costa's syndrome include fatigue upon exertion, weakness induced by minor activity, shortness of breath, palpitations, sweating, and chest pain.

== Causes ==
Da Costa's syndrome was originally considered to be heart failure or other cardiac condition; by the 1970s, when the ICD-9 was published, it had been recategorized as psychiatric. The term is no longer in common use by any medical agencies and has generally been superseded by more specific diagnoses, some of which have a medical basis.

== Diagnosis ==
Although it is listed in the ICD-9 (306.2) and ICD-10 (F45.3) under "somatoform autonomic dysfunction", the term is no longer in common use by any medical agencies and has generally been superseded by more specific diagnoses.

The orthostatic intolerance observed by Da Costa has since also been found in patients diagnosed with myalgic encephalomyelitis/chronic fatigue syndrome, postural orthostatic tachycardia syndrome (POTS) and mitral valve prolapse syndrome. In the 21st century, this orthostatic intolerance is classified as a neurological condition. Exercise intolerance has since been found in many organic diseases.

=== Classification ===
There are many names for the syndrome, which has variously been called soldier's heart, cardiac neurosis, chronic asthenia, effort syndrome, functional cardiovascular disease, neurocirculatory asthenia, primary neurasthenia, and subacute asthenia. Da Costa himself called it irritable heart and the term soldier's heart was in common use both before and after his paper. Most authors use these terms interchangeably, but some authors draw a distinction between the different manifestations of this condition, preferring to use different labels to highlight the predominance of psychiatric or non-psychiatric complaints. For example, Oglesby Paul writes that "Not all patients with neurocirculatory asthenia have a cardiac neurosis, and not all patients with cardiac neurosis have neurocirculatory asthenia." None of these terms have widespread use.

== Treatment ==
The report of Da Costa shows that patients recovered from the more severe symptoms when removed from the strenuous activity or sustained lifestyle that caused them. A reclined position and forced bed rest were the most beneficial.

Other treatments evident from the previous studies were improving physique and posture, appropriate levels of exercise where possible, wearing loose clothing about the waist, and avoiding postural changes such as stooping, or lying on the left or right side, or the back in some cases, which relieved some of the palpitations and chest pains, and standing up slowly can prevent the faintness associated with postural or orthostatic hypotension in some cases.

Pharmacological intervention came in the form of digitalis, a group of glycoside drugs derived from the foxglove (Digitalis purpurea), which is now known to act as a sodium-potassium ATPase inhibitor, increasing stroke volume and decreasing heart rate; at the time it was used for the latter effect in patients with palpitations.

== History ==
Da Costa's syndrome is named for the surgeon Jacob Mendes Da Costa, who first observed it in soldiers during the American Civil War. At the time it was proposed, Da Costa's syndrome was seen as a very desirable physiological explanation for "soldier's heart". Use of the term "Da Costa's syndrome" peaked in the early 20th century. Towards the mid-century, the condition was generally re-characterized as a form of neurosis. It was initially classified as "F45.3" (under somatoform disorder of the heart and cardiovascular system) in ICD-10, and is now classified under "somatoform autonomic dysfunction".

Da Costa's syndrome involves a set of symptoms that include left-sided chest pains, palpitations, breathlessness, and fatigue in response to exertion. Earl de Grey who presented four reports on British soldiers with these symptoms between 1864 and 1868, and attributed them to the heavy weight of military equipment being carried in knapsacks that were tightly strapped to the chest in a manner that constricted the action of the heart. Also in 1864, Henry Harthorme observed soldiers in the American Civil War who had similar symptoms that were attributed to "long-continued overexertion, with deficiency of rest and often nourishment", and indefinite heart complaints were attributed to lack of sleep and bad food. In 1870 Arthur Bowen Myers of the Coldstream Guards also regarded the accoutrements as the cause of the trouble, which he called neurocirculatory asthenia and cardiovascular neurosis.

J. M. Da Costa's study of 300 soldiers reported similar findings in 1871 and added that the condition often developed and persisted after a bout of fever or diarrhoea. He also noted that the pulse was always greatly and rapidly influenced by position, such as stooping or reclining. A typical case involved a man who was on active duty for several months or more and contracted an annoying bout of diarrhoea or fever, and then, after a short stay in hospital, returned to active service. The soldier soon found that he could not keep up with his comrades in the exertions of a soldier's life as previously, because he would get out of breath, and would get dizzy, and have palpitations and pains in his chest, yet upon examination some time later he appeared generally healthy. In 1876 surgeon Arthur Davy attributed the symptoms to military foot drill where "over-expanding the chest, caused dilatation of the heart, and so induced irritability".

During World War I, Sir Thomas Lewis (who had been a member of staff of the Medical Research Committee) studied many soldiers who had been referred to the Military Heart Hospitals in Hampstead and Colchester with 'disordered action of the heart' or 'valvular disease of the heart'. In 1918 he published a monograph summarizing his findings, which showed that the vast majority did not have structural heart disease, as evidenced by the diagnostic methods available at the time. In it, he reviewed the difference in symptoms between 'effort syndrome' and structural heart disease, examined possible causes of 'effort syndrome', the diagnosis of structural heart disease in soldiers, its outlook and treatment, and lessons learned by the Army.

Since then, a variety of similar or partly similar conditions named above have been described.

== See also ==
- Shell shock
- Combat fatigue
- Takotsubo cardiomyopathy
- Postural orthostatic tachycardia syndrome
- Soldier's Heart (novel)
