= Dunedin Writers & Readers Festival =

Literary festival in New Zealand

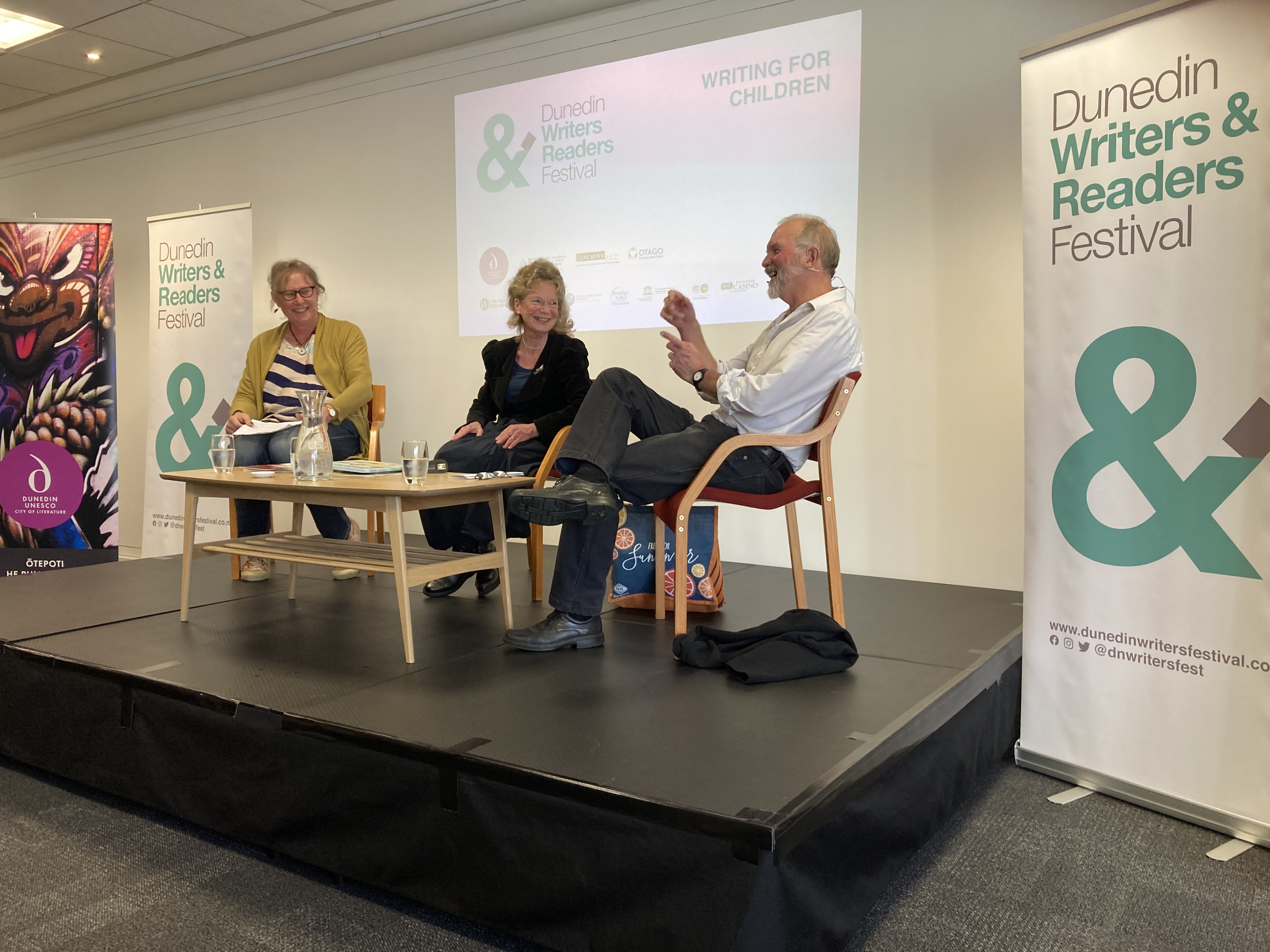
- Kyle Mewburn, Robyn Belton and David Elliot during the 2021 festival session "Writing for Children"
- Genre: literary festival
- Country: New Zealand
- Established: 2014
- Patron: Lynley Hood
- Website: https://www.dunedinwritersfestival.co.nz/

The Dunedin Writers & Readers Festival (abbreviated as DWRF) is a literary festival held in Dunedin, in the South Island of New Zealand. Since its inception in 2014, there have been in total six festivals, including a special Celtic Noir event in 2019. The event is based mainly at the Dunedin Public Art Gallery but utilises Toitū Otago Settlers Museum, the Otago Pioneer Women's Memorial Hall, the Dunedin Central Library and in 2021 the central live music venue Dog with Two Tails. Festival events include talks, book launches, workshops, a storytrain or storybus, and in some years the unveiling of a new plaque on the Dunedin Writers' Walk.

In 2020 Hannah Molloy replaced Claire Finlayson as director of the festival.

== Event history ==
The inaugural festival was held in May 2014, with events following in 2015, 2017, two in 2019, and then 2021. Previous to the establishment of the festival, there was a writers' event in Dunedin called Wordstruck!. Wordstruck! began as a writers' week initiated by playwright Roger Hall in 1989, and then ran biennially for almost 15 years; it may have been New Zealand's first writers' week.

== 2014 Dunedin Writers & Readers Festival ==
The inaugural festival ran from Friday 9 May to Sunday 11 May 2014, and had a line-up including Alexander McCall Smith, Huw Lewis-Jones, Janice Galloway, Nigel Leask, Eleanor Catton, Majella Cullinane, Kate de Goldi and Julie Le Clerc. Almost every event sold out. The first Dunedin Writers & Readers Festival in 2014 coincided with Dunedin's bid to become a UNESCO City of Literature.

== 2015 Dunedin Writers & Readers Festival ==
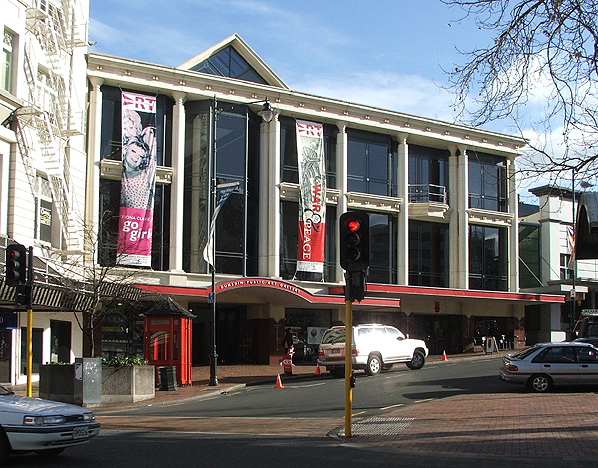
Dunedin Public Art Gallery, venue for many of the festival events

The success of Dunedin's bid to become a City of Literature was announced in November 2014. The 2015 festival ran 5–10 May, and included a series of literary lunches, workshops on romance, intellectual property, and writing for young adults, a "speed date an author" event, a centenary lecture recital for W.B Yeats, and a Janet Frame memorial lecture given by Daphne Clair de Jong. A plaque to writer Dan Davin was unveiled on the Dunedin Writers' Walk. The Fortune Theatre hosted a stage adaptation of Mrs Dalloway, performed by Rebecca Vaughan. Guests included Damian Barr, Liam McIlvanney, Anna Smaill, Majella Cullinane, Nick Davies and Patricia Grace.

== 2017 Dunedin Writers & Readers Festival ==
The 2017 event ran from 9 May to 14 May. It included, according to Grant Smithies, "more laureates than you could shake a stick at", with over 80 writers, illustrators, performers and other guests. International speakers included Ian Rankin, Stella Duffy, Hannah Kent, Miranda Carter and John Lanchester, alongside Bill Manhire, Victor Rodger, and Catherine Chidgey. British actress Rebecca Vaughan performed the one-woman play Jane Eyre: An Autobiography, written by Elton Townend Jones.

There were 36 events, including workshops, panel sessions, poetry readings, theatrical performances, and book launches.

== 2019 Dunedin Writers & Readers Festival ==
The 2019 event ran from 9 May to 12 May and included more than 60 writers. International guests included John Boyne; UK hip-hop artist and author Akala, French picture-book author-illustrators Eric Veillé and Clotilde Perrin, novelist Markus Zusak, feminist author Clementine Ford and Australian Children's Laureate Morris Gleitzman.

== 2019 Celtic Noir Festival ==
The 10–13 October inaugural Celtic Noir Festival featured a workshop on how to plot a thriller by Liam McIlvanney, Fiona Kidman talking about her true crime novel This Mortal Boy, Adrian McKinty, Liz Nugent and Vanda Symon, and Val McDermid, who was the Visiting Professor of Scottish Studies and Crime Fiction at the University of Otago.

== 2021 Dunedin Writers & Readers Festival ==
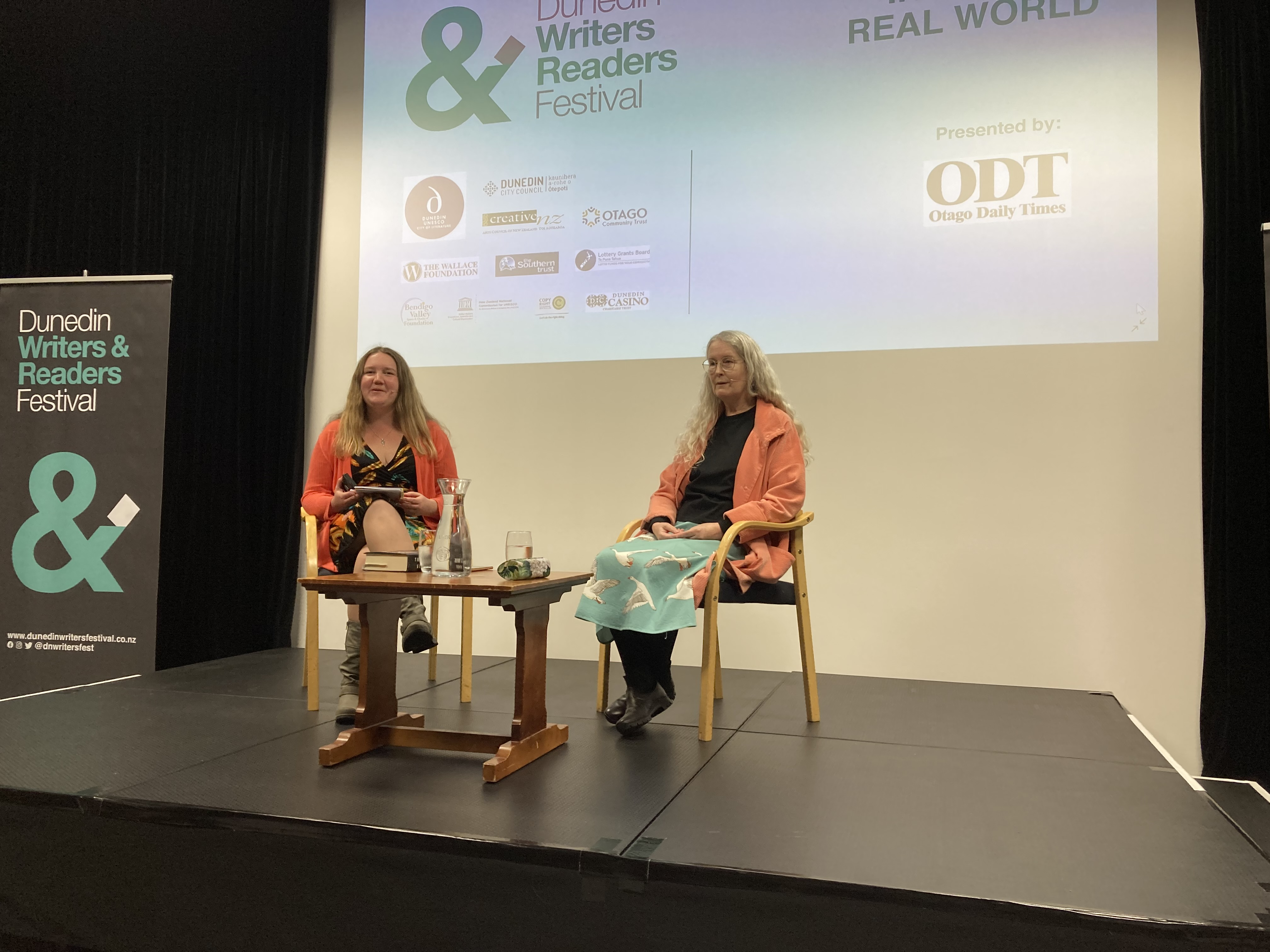
H. G. Parry and Elizabeth Knox during the 2021 festival session "Placing Fantasy Inside the Real World"

Due to the closure of New Zealand's borders for COVID-19, the 2021 festival featured only New Zealand-based speakers, with 55 guests over 35 events and five venues, Toitū Otago Settlers Museum, Dunedin Public Art Gallery, Dunedin Central Library, Otago Pioneer Women's Memorial Hall, and cafe bar Dog with Two Tails. The story train that had featured at previous festivals was replaced with a story bus, departing from Dunedin Botanic Garden. Speakers included Witi Ihimaera, Elizabeth Knox, Nalini Singh, Vincent O'Sullivan, and Liz Breslin. During the festival, a new plaque on the Dunedin Writers' Walk was unveiled, honouring romance writer Essie Summers.

== 2023 Dunedin Writers & Readers Festival ==
The theme for the 2023 event, which ran 13–15 October, was “Te Pūao - the place where the river meets the sea”. It marked fifty years of publishing by Witi Ihimaera, and 145 years since Katherine Mansfield's birth. The festival director was Kitty Brown (Kāi Tahu, Kāti Mamoe). The development of the programme involved two Māori curators for the first time, law professor Jacinta Ruru and history professor Angela Wanhalla. The opening event was a pōwhiri at Ōtākou Marae, followed by a conversation between Ihimaera, Linda Tuhiwai Smith and Monty Soutar. Other events included a 'soapbox poetry' event on election day, themed around politics. Featured writers and speakers included Coco Solid, Chris Tse, Emma Espiner, David Eggleton, Emily Writes, Fiona Farrell, Leonie Pihama, and Ihumātao activist Qiane Matata-Sipu, speaking alongside researcher Karen Nairn.

== 2025 Dunedin Writers & Readers Festival ==
No festival was held in 2024. The theme for the 2025 festival, which ran from 16 to 18 October, was "Ahi ka – keeping the home fires burning". The opening event and pōwhiri were held at the Ōtākou Marae, and the festival included a fashion history talk at Toitū Otago Settlers Museum, focused on Eden Hore, a poetry evening at WOOF! bar, and panels and talks by Tāme Iti, Victor Rodger, Talia Marshall, Becky Manawatu, Louise Wallace, Susie Ferguson and Laurence Fearnley. Jane Austen's 250th birthday was marked with a Regency costume high tea at Tūhura Otago Museum, and the 250th issue of the literary magazine Landfall was marked with a symposium at the museum and an exhibition in Special Collections at the University of Otago central library.
