= Dunedin Writers' Walk =

Series of plaques in Dunedin, New Zealand

The Dunedin Writers' Walk is a series of 29 commemorative plaques in the upper Octagon area of the city of Dunedin, New Zealand.

The plaques were installed to honour and celebrate the lives and works of writers with a Dunedin connection, many of whom were Robert Burns Fellows at the University of Otago. Each plaque includes a quote from the writer's work and brief biographical details.

The walk was the idea of local writer Lynley Hood, and was installed in 1993, with an initial eleven plaques. Only writers who had mentioned Dunedin in their work were considered in the initial list. There is a time capsule buried underneath the plaque for Jean de Hamel.

A plaque to Dan Davin was added in during the 2015 Dunedin Writers and Readers Festival. The twenty-fourth plaque, for playwright Robert Lord, was unveiled during the 2017 festival. During the 2021 festival, a plaque was added for romance writer Essie Summers. In February 2022, two plaques were added for poet Peter Olds and short story writer O.E. Middleton. Further plaques were added in 2023 (Angus Cameron Robertson) and 2025 (Vincent O'Sullivan).

Janet Frame has two plaques in the Writers' Walk, one in the Octagon and a second at the "unofficial extension" of the walk at the railway station.

== List ==
Plaque	Writer	Dates on plaque	Quotation	Source	Other plaque text
	Alexander Gaskell Pickard (A. P. Gaskell)	1913–2006	The football match at Carisbrook was over .... Inside the dressing-room there was a strong human smell of sweaty togs, muddy boots and warm bodies as the men came prancing back naked from the showers and stood on the seats drying themselves.	The Big Game and Other Stories (1947)	"Alexander Gaskell Pickard – writer, sportsman, teacher, watercolourist – graduated from the University of Otago and its rugby team in 1936."
	Alfred Hamish Reed	1875–1975	Otago was believed to be bleak and cold.... This amusing mistaken notion is still held by a few people in the northern sub-tropical parts of New Zealand.	The Story of New Zealand (1975)	"Writer and benefactor Sir Alfred Reed and his nephew Wyclif founded the N.Z. – Australian publishing house of A.H. and A.W. Reed in Dunedin."
	Brian Turner	born 1944	And soon across the bay, a white sail leaned on the burnished sea and the morning billowed becoming bluer.	Portobello Bay (1992)	"The work of poet Brian Turner reflects the landscapes and moods of his native Otago."
	Charles Brasch	1909–1973	I grew to know most of the country about Dunedin, in all its variousness. It impressed itself on me so strongly that it seemed to accompany me always, becoming an interior landscape of my mind, or imagination, unchanging, archetypal.....	Indirections (1980)	"Dunedin-born poet, editor and philanthropist Charles Brasch founded Landfall literary magazine in this city in 1947."
	Christine Johnston	born 1950	...a city built in stone on half a century of gold from the hinterland, a wealthy little city where the rich inhabited the hills and looked out to sea and the poor inhabited the flat and looked at each other.	Blessed Are Thou Among Women (1991)	"Christine Johnston's first novel is set in her home town, Dunedin."
	Cilla McQueen	born 1949	At this hour, Dunedin is asleep The cat is asleep in the valley of bedclothes The chrysalis on the kowhai tree is silvery with frost.	Berlin Diary (1990)	"English-born poet Cilla McQueen spent her formative years in Dunedin. Images of this city – its life and its landscapes – are woven through her award-winning work."
	Dan Davin	1913–1990	... the blue of the hills and the Scotch mist were more beautiful than I had remembered them. I shall regret not having come here sooner and stayed longer.	Personal diary entry on return to Dunedin (1948)	"University of Otago Rhodes scholar, novelist, short-story writer, soldier and war historian. Literary critic and publisher at Oxford University Press. Remembered for his legendary hospitality to visiting NZ writers."
	Denis Glover	1912–1980	Over the harbour waters A slow-gonged clock Floats the hours and the quarters.	Dunedin Revisited (1950)	"In this poem Dunedin-born Denis Glover – poet, printer & humorist – describes the chimes of the Dunedin town hall clock."
	Hone Tuwhare	born 1922	It didn't make a grand entrance and I nearly missed it – tip-toeing up on me as it did when I was half asleep and suddenly they're there before my eyes – white pointillist flakes on a Hotere canvas – swirling about untethered.	Snowfall (1982)	"Northland-born poet Hone Tuwhare came to Dunedin in 1969 to take up the Robert Burns Fellowship, and stayed 23 years."
	James K. Baxter	1926–1972	King Robert, on your anvil stone Above the lumbering Octagon, To you I raise a brother's horn.	Letter to Robert Burns (1967)	"The gifted, bawdy & religious poet, Dunedin-born James K. Baxter, was Robert Burns Fellow at the University of Otago in 1967."
	Janet Frame	born 1924	Having been to church the people are good, quiet, with sober drops at the end of their cold Dunedin noses, with polite, old-fashioned sentences like, Pass the Cruet, and, later, attentive glorying in each other's roses.	Sunday Afternoon at Two O'Clock (1967)	"Internationally acclaimed novelist Janet Frame wrote poetry during her term as 1965 Robert Burns Fellow at the University of Otago."
	Joan de Hamel	born 1924	What more could anyone want than their own land down to the shoreline and the whole Pacific Ocean as a boundary fence?	Hideaway (1992)	"Joan de Hamel's first book, "X Marks the Spot", was a landmark in New Zealand's children's literature. She came to Dunedin in 1963 and has lived on the Otago Peninsula ever since."
	John A. Lee	1891–1982	...although Dunedin was one of the most prosperous and God-fearing cities in the new and rich country of New Zealand, there was poverty in the land and ... we were poor even amid poverty.	Children of the Poor (1934)	"John A. Lee's harsh childhood in Dunedin inspired his later contributions to N.Z. literature, politics and social reform."
	John Barr	1809–1889	Hurrah for Otago! we're now on our way, Where there's plenty of work, and plenty to pay; Hurrah for Otago! our friends are before, But the land of the heather we'll never see more.	Hurrah for Otago! (1860)	"Dunedin's first poet, John Barr, left Scotland for Otago in 1852. His verse celebrates the freedom and hard work of life in the new colony."
	John Hamilton	1827–1893	Poor Robbie Burns, we all are much your debtor, And while you lived we should have used you better; For though you lived and died in poverty; You left to use a priceless legacy	(1892)	"Written and read by the Burns Club Founder John Hamilton at the first anniversary meeting 1892."
	Lauris Edmond	born 1924	...we rather enjoyed the cold climate, our austere circumstances, and that sense of living in a superior outpost that Dunedin seems to confer on its citizens.	Bonfires in the Rain (1991)	"Poet Lauris Edmond spent 1946, the first year of her marriage, in Dunedin."
	Robin Hyde	1906–1939	It was a Sunday afternoon, and there seemed little in Dunedin but the echo of morning chimes, like lazy bees in a stone foxglove, and little trams bouncing along to the suburbs.	Nor the Years Condemned (1938)	"The journalism, poetry & novels of Robin Hyde were largely forgotten until the 1950s. She is now regarded as a major N.Z. writer."
	Roger Hall	born 1939	In Dunedin it rains in the summer only when a national sporting event held in the city is being televised live.	A Dunedin View (1989)	"Roger Hall, New Zealand's most successful playwright, lived in Dunedin from 1977 to 1995. He was a major contributor to the city's cultural life and a loyal defender of the local weather."
	Ruth Dallas	born 1919	Some of them found time to be photographed, With bearded husband And twelve or thirteen children.	Pioneer Women (1987)	"Internationally published poet and children's author Ruth Dallas was Robert Burns Fellow at the University of Otago in 1968."
	Thomas Bracken	1843–1898	Behold the noble city towering high Above the silver mirror framed in green!	James MacAndrew (1890)	"Thomas Bracken, N.Z.'s most popular 19th century poet & author of "God Defend New Zealand", praised Dunedin extravagantly in his verse."
	Witi Ihimaera	born 1944	We are in another country/Scotitanga/Where brass bands play People fling to Scottish music in Moray Place, ladies of the Salvation Army palm ribboned tambourines, and smiles shiver and snap in the cold.	Deep South/Impressions of Another Country (1975)	"Witi Ihimaera, the first Maori novelist to be published, was 1975 Robert Burns Fellow at the University of Otago."
	Robert Lord	1945–1992	The house is taking shape. Have planted a kaka beak in the barrel ... also have a cabbage tree I might put there.	From a letter to Bebe Lord, Robert's mother, written in his Dunedin cottage (8 February 1991)	"Playwright and co-founder of Playmarket" "The Robert Lord cottage is now a residence for writers to come to Dunedin to contribute to the city's literary life."
	Frank Sargeson	1903–1982	... they behaved in a manner similar to what I was shortly afterwards to encounter in Dunedin – that is to say they had the time, with as well plenty to spare without grudge or impatience.	Never Enough! (1977)	"Short-story writer Frank Sargeson, pioneer of the literary use of colloquial N.Z. speech, visited Dunedin in 1951."
	Essie Summers	1912–1998	My heart is in Dunedin ... Apart from its own charm, with its Scots atmosphere, its hills, its air of being a university town ... it is the gateway to our glorious Central Otago countryside...	The Essie Summers Story (1974)	"Queen of Romance" "56 novels in 25 languages; sales of 19 million. Her books brought readers to New Zealand."
	Dennis McEldowney	born 1926	Dunedin is a place where it is front page headline news if someone has a fire in their wardrobe.	Full of the Warm South (1983)	Author and editor Dennis McEldowney spent four years in Dunedin during the 1960s.
	Peter Olds	born 1944	This is where I came to write my songs when they first twitched in the mind.	In the Dragon Cafe (2006)	Robert Burns Fellow at the University of Otago 1978 "has been called the 'Laureate of the Marginalised', many of his Dunedin poems are stories of his walks 'street after salt-wind street'"
	O E (Ted) Middleton	1925–2010	Flagstaff - swampy. Pig-rooting velvety patches of Andreaea moss, snow berries, stunted flax, tussock, gorse (sweet-scented). The hare that started up, with a flash of white tail, from a hide of basalt hummocks in front of me. The lovely soft shades of the gently-sloping countryside...	Notebooks (1970)	"O.E. Middleton wrote short stories and novellas.Robert Burns Fellow at the University of Otago 1970–1971."
	Angus Cameron Robertson	1867–1945	Advance, Dunedin! Eden of the South... Of all the Southern Cities thou art Queen — Fair as the dawn when wreathed in rosy red And gold and ruby mingle in the sky, And blushing hues adorn the eastern wave	Dunedin: The City Beautiful (1925))	"Hon. Bard of the Gaelic Society of New Zealand, mariner and author. Arrived in Dunedin as extra master mariner, 1899. Well known for his popular poems about Dunedin and for Salt Sea Tang (1927, a collection of poetry and prose in Gaelic and English."
	Sir Vincent O'Sullivan	1937–2024	At the Chinese Gardens where the rocks made pictures in the water and it was always very quiet Tommo said you were meant to sit still so th quiet came inside you until you and everything else were like part of each other.	"The Walkers" (2022)	"Poet, short story writer, novelist, playwright, critic, editor, biographer, librettist and academic. New Zealand Poet Laureate (2013–2015). Dunedin was Vincent O'Sullivan's home from 2011 – 2024. Kua Hinga He Tōtara."
