= Vivienne Anderson (academic) =

New Zealand professor of education

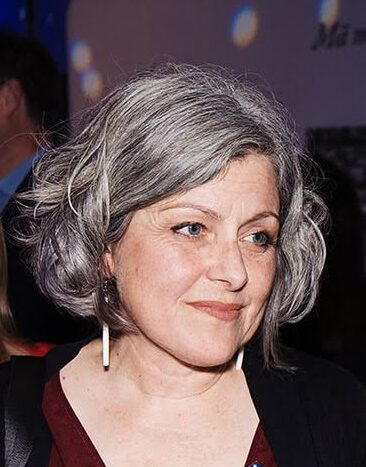

Academic background
- Education: University of Otago
- Thesis: The experiences of international and New Zealand women in New Zealand higher education (2009)
- Doctoral advisor: Karen Nairn, Jacqueline Leckie

Vivienne Ruth Anderson is a New Zealand academic, and is a full professor at the University of Otago, specialising in the interface of education policy and practice, and issues around accessibility of education.

== Academic career ==
Anderson is a qualified teacher, and worked in primary schools in Christchurch and Palmerston North before moving to Dunedin in 2002. Her experience accessing education as a parent led her to postgraduate study in education. She completed a PhD titled The experiences of international and New Zealand women in New Zealand higher education at the University of Otago in 2009, supervised by Karen Nairn and Jacqueline Leckie. Anderson worked as a research fellow in the university's dental school, before being appointed as a lecturer in the College of Education at Otago, rising to associate professor in 2021 and full professor in 2024. Since 2021, she has been the dean of the university's College of Education.

Anderson's research covers the accessibility to children and young people of quality education, focusing on issues such as educational mobility, education pathways and equity and access. She is interested in educational policy and practice across varied settings including school, university, vocational education and health profession education. She has a particular interest in the education experiences of migrants and refugees, and has a three-year research project with young people with refugee backgrounds, exploring their transition from secondary to tertiary education.

Anderson works internationally and supervises doctoral students in Japan, Fiji, Malaysia and Cambodia.

== Selected works ==
- Wendy Green; Anderson, Vivienne Ruth; Kathleen Tait; Ly Thi Tran (2020). "Precarity, fear and hope: reflecting and imagining in higher education during a global pandemic". Higher Education Research and Development. 39 (7): 1309–1312. doi:10.1080/07294360.2020.1826029. Wikidata Q125619151.
- Lee Adam; Anderson, Vivienne Ruth; Rachel Spronken-Smith (2016). "'It's not fair': policy discourses and students' understandings of plagiarism in a New Zealand university". Higher Education. 74 (1): 17–32. doi:10.1007/s10734-016-0025-9. Wikidata Q124303994.
- J Subramanian; Anderson, Vivienne Ruth; Morgaine, Kate C.; Thomson, Murray William (2012). "The importance of 'student voice' in dental education". European Journal of Dental Education. 17 (1): e136-41. doi:10.1111/j.1600-0579.2012.00773.x. PMID 23279401. Wikidata Q38070876.
- Karla Gambetta-Tessini; Rodrigo Mariño; Mike Morgan; Wendell Evans; Anderson, Vivienne Ruth (2013). "Stress and health-promoting attributes in Australian, New Zealand, and Chilean dental students". Journal of Dental Education. 77 (6): 801–809. PMID 23740917. Wikidata Q47881579.
- Lyndie Foster Page; M Kang; Anderson, Vivienne Ruth; Thomson, Murray William (2011). "Appraisal of the Dundee Ready Educational Environment Measure in the New Zealand dental educational environment". European Journal of Dental Education. 16 (2): 78–85. doi:10.1111/j.1600-0579.2011.00725.x. PMID 22494305. Wikidata Q51794614.
- Rob Wass; Anderson, Vivienne Ruth; Rafaela Rabello; Clinton Golding; Ana Rangi; Esmay Eteuati (2019). "Photovoice as a research method for higher education research". Higher Education Research and Development. 39 (4): 834–850. doi:10.1080/07294360.2019.1692791. Wikidata Q125185721.
- Anderson, Vivienne Ruth (2014). "'World-travelling': a framework for re-thinking teaching and learning in internationalised higher education". Higher Education. 68 (5): 637–652. doi:10.1007/s10734-014-9736-y. Wikidata Q125185728.
- Anderson, Vivienne Ruth; Rafaela Rabello; Rob Wass; Clinton Golding; Ana Rangi; Esmay Eteuati; Zoe Bristowe; Arianna Waller (2019). "Good teaching as care in higher education". Higher Education. 79 (1): 1–19. doi:10.1007/s10734-019-00392-6. Wikidata Q125619152.
