= Anne Smith (academic) =

New Zealand children's rights researcher

Anne Briar Smith CNZM FRSNZ
- Born: Anne Briar Riddall; 13 August 1940; Porthcawl, Wales
- Died: 22 May 2016 (aged 75); Dunedin, New Zealand
- Spouse: John Smith

Academic background
- Education: University of Alberta
- Thesis: Verbalization and selective attention in discrimination shift problems (1971)

Academic work
- Discipline: Children's rights; violence against children; gender stereotyping
- Institutions: University of Otago
- Doctoral students: Nicola Taylor

Anne Briar Smith CNZM FRSNZ (née Riddall, 13 August 1940 – 22 May 2016) was a New Zealand professor at the University of Otago, and was a pioneering children's rights researcher.

== Early life and education ==
Smith was born on 13 August 1940 in Porthcawl, Wales, to Dora and Geoff Riddall. Her father worked for the Iraq Petroleum Company, and when that necessitated the family move to Syria, Smith boarded at the Welsh Girls' School in England, aged nine. The family moved to New Zealand in 1954, and Smith attended Te Aroha College, where she was dux in both 1956 and 1957.

== Academic career ==
Smith completed a BHSc in Home Science at the University of Otago in 1963, and then completed a BA in Education at both Otago and Auckland Universities in 1965. She then undertook an MEd at the University of Alberta in 1969, and then completed a PhD titled Verbalization and selective attention in discrimination shift problems there in 1971. She was supported during her PhD by a Commonwealth Scholarship and an Izaack Walton Killam Memorial Fellowship. After Smith finished her PhD, she and her husband spent two years working for an experimental tertiary education institution in Halifax, Nova Scotia.

In 1974, Smith was appointed as a lecturer in education and human development at the University of Otago. By this time she had two young girls, making her research on quality early childhood education especially relevant. She was instrumental in getting the Dunedin Community Childcare Association established. She also made four films, including Blue for a Girl, about gender stereotyping.

Smith became the inaugural director of the Children's Issues Centre at the University of Otago in 1995. Her work focused in ways to improve children's lives, especially in times of stress such as when parents divorce. She worked to ban physical punishment of children. Notable doctoral students of Smith's include Nicola Taylor, who succeeded her as director of the Centre.

Her book Understanding Children's Development was first published in 1982, became a standard text, and is in its fifth edition (now titled Understanding children and childhood).

== Family ==
Smith married Dr John Smith in Edmonton, Canada, in May 1967. They had two daughters. Smith died on 22 May 2016 in Dunedin.

== Honours and legacy ==
Smith was elected a Fellow of the Royal Society Te Apārangi in 1995, and appointed a Companion of the New Zealand Order of Merit, for services to children, in the 2007 New Year Honours. Smith was awarded an honorary doctorate by the University of Oulu in Finland in 1998. In 2013 Smith was awarded a New Zealand–UK Link Foundation visiting professorship, enabling her to give a series of public lectures in London on children’s rights and the links between government policy and research on children’s issues. On the same trip, she spoke to a House of Lords select committee and the Welsh Assembly against physical violence towards children.

After Smith's death, her colleagues were inspired to write a book honouring her achievements, entitled Research, policy and advocacy in the early years: Writing inspired by the achievements of Professor Anne Smith, edited by Carmen Dalli and Anne Meade. Smith was selected as one of the Royal Society Te Apārangi's 150 women in 150 words in 2017.

== Selected works ==
- Smith, Briar Anne (2016). Children's rights: towards social justice. Dunedin: Otago University Press. ISBN 978-1-60650-778-0. OCLC 936210024. OL 38374355M. Wikidata Q105069869.
- Smith, Briar Anne; Nicola Taylor (1996). Supporting children and parents through family changes: Children's Issues Centre, National Seminar proceedings, November 1995. Dunedin: Otago University Press. ISBN 978-1-877133-07-7. LCCN 97157960. OCLC 37595073. OL 761051M. Wikidata Q105069870.
- Smith, Briar Anne; Nicola J Taylor; Childwatch International Research Network; Citizenship Study Group (2009). Children as citizens?: international voices. Dunedin: Otago University Press. ISBN 978-1-877372-62-9. LCCN 2009397834. OCLC 318875007. OL 23625025M. Wikidata Q105069871.
- Smith, Briar Anne (2015), Enhancing children's rights: connecting research, policy and practice (in undetermined language), Basingstoke, New York City: Palgrave Macmillan, OCLC 904609640, Wikidata Q105069872
- Smith, Briar Anne (2001). Children whose parents live apart: family & legal concepts. Dunedin: University of Otago. ISBN 978-0-9583595-9-7. OCLC 155257984. OL 55727639M. Wikidata Q105069873.
- Smith, Briar Anne (2013). Understanding children and childhood: a New Zealand perspective. Wellington: Bridget Williams Books. ISBN 978-1-927131-76-3. OCLC 864002845. Wikidata Q105069874.
- Smith, Briar Anne (2016). "Achieving social justice for children: How can children's rights thinking make a difference?". American Journal of Orthopsychiatry. 86 (5): 500–507. doi:10.1037/ort0000191. PMID 27617741. Wikidata Q47660861.
- Smith, Briar Anne; Gaffney, Michael; Nairn, Karen Marie (2004). "Health rights in secondary schools: student and staff perspectives". Health Education Research. 19 (1): 85–97. doi:10.1093/her/cyg007. PMID 15020548. Wikidata Q51942459.
- Smith, Briar Anne (2010). "Children as citizens and partners in strengthening communities". American Journal of Orthopsychiatry. 80 (1): 103–8. doi:10.1111/j.1939-0025.2010.01012.x. PMID 20397994. Wikidata Q56895872.
