= Nicola Taylor =

New Zealand socio-legal scholar

Academic background
- Education: Waitaki Girls' High School, University of Otago
- Thesis: Care of children : families, dispute resolution and the Family Court (2006)
- Doctoral advisors: Anne Smith; Mark Henaghan

Nicola Joy Taylor is a New Zealand academic, and a barrister and solicitor of the High Court of New Zealand. She is a full professor at the University of Otago, holding the Alexander McMillan Leading Thinkers Chair in Childhood Studies, where she researches child and family law.

== Academic career ==
Taylor earned a Bachelor of Social Work degree with honours from Massey University, and graduated with a Bachelor of Laws degree with first-class honours from the University of Otago in 1998. From 2001, she undertook doctoral research at the University of Otago's Children's Issues Centre, supervised by Anne Smith and Mark Henaghan, with her 2006 PhD thesis titled Care of children: families, dispute resolution and the Family Court at the University of Otago.

Taylor is a barrister and solicitor of the High Court of New Zealand, and an accredited family mediator. She joined the faculty of the University of Otago, rising to associate professor in 2012, and full professor in 2021. Taylor holds the Alexander McMillan Leading Thinker Chair in Childhood Studies, and is the director of the Children's Issues Centre within the Otago Faculty of Law.

Taylor's research on socio-legal matters covers child and family law. She is interested in topics such as post-separation care arrangements, relationship property division, international child abduction, and family dispute resolution. She was funded by the New Zealand Law Foundation to assess the family law reforms of 2014. The reforms focused on moving work into out-of-court processes. The research showed "high levels of dissatisfaction" with the reforms amongst professionals, and that parents and caregivers wanted greater account taken of children's wishes. Taylor was appointed to the Expert Reference Group formed in 2018 to assessing the reforms, and her research findings contributed to Andrew Little's 2020 Family Court Legislation Bill.

== Selected works ==
- Mary Ann Powell; Anne Graham; Antonia Canosa; Donnah Anderson; Tim Moore; Sally Robinson; Nigel P. Thomas; Nicola Taylor (2020). "Child safety in policy: Who is being kept safe and from what?". Social Policy and Administration. 54 (7): 1160–1178. doi:10.1111/spol.12591. Wikidata Q105070719.
- Marilyn Freeman; Nicola Taylor (2020). "Domestic violence and child participation: contemporary challenges for the 1980 hague child abduction convention". Journal of Social Welfare and Family Law. 42 (2): 154–175. doi:10.1080/09649069.2020.1751938. Wikidata Q105070720.
- Theodore, Reremoana Farquharson; Karen Tustin; Jesse Kokaua; Megan Gollop; Kiro, Cynthia Alcyion; Nicola Taylor; Poulton, Richie Graham (2019). "Occupations and industries of employment of Māori university graduates: early career aspirations and destinations". Kotuitui: New Zealand Journal Of Social Sciences Online. 15 (1): 140–153. doi:10.1080/1177083x.2019.1669671. Wikidata Q105070721.
- Smith, Briar Anne; Nicola J. Taylor (28 February 2017), Children’s Rights in Early Childhood Education, Oxford Bibliographies, doi:10.1093/obo/9780199756810-0178, Wikidata Q105070722
- Megan Gollop; Nicola Taylor (8 March 2012), "New Zealand Children and Young People's Perspectives on Relocation Following Parental Separation", Law and Childhood Studies: Current Legal Issues Volume 14 Law and Childhood Studies: Current Legal Issues Volume 14, pp. 219–242, doi:10.1093/acprof:oso/9780199652501.003.0015, Wikidata Q105070724
- Graham, Anne; Canosa, Antonia; Tess Boyle; Moore, Tim P.; Nicola Taylor; Donnah L Anderson; Robinson, Sally (2022). "Promoting students' safety and wellbeing: ethical practice in schools". Australian Educational Researcher. doi:10.1007/s13384-022-00567-8. Wikidata Q113899245.
- Nicola Taylor; Smith, Briar Anne (2015), "Thinking About Children: How Does It Influence Policy and Practice?", Handbook of Children and Youth Studies, pp. 49–62, doi:10.1007/978-981-4451-15-4_53, Wikidata Q105070723
