= Vivian Anderson =

Vivian Anderson may also refer to:

- Vivian Anderson (baseball) (1921–2012), All-American Girls Professional Baseball League player
- Viv Anderson (Vivian Alexander Anderson, born 1956), English football player and coach
- Vivien Oakland (Vivian Ruth Anderson, 1895–1958), twentieth century American actress
- Vivienne Anderson, New Zealand professor of education

== See also ==
- Anderson (surname)
