= John Dickson (New Zealand poet) =

New Zealand poet (1944–2017)

- Born: 8 August 1944; Milton, New Zealand
- Died: 4 February 2017 (aged 72)
- Education: University of Otago
- Writing career
- Genre: Poetry
- Notable awards: Robert Burns Fellowship

John David Dickson (8 August 1944 – 4 February 2017) was a New Zealand poet. A 1988 recipient of the Robert Burns Fellowship, he published three books of poetry and was the 2000 writer in residence at the University of Waikato.

== Background ==
Dickson was born in Milton in South Otago in 1944. His father, Walter Dickson, was a farm worker. His mother, Margaret Dickson, was a music teacher; she died when her son was 14. Dickson had one brother, 15 years his senior. He received his education at Southland Boys' High School in Invercargill and graduated from the University of Otago in Dunedin with a Bachelor of Arts with a major in English. He then trained as a librarian in Wellington and worked at Otago Polytechnic's The Bill Robertson Library until he was made redundant in 2007. He then followed his partner, Jen Uren, whom he had known since their teenage years, to Christchurch where she had moved to in 1990. In Christchurch, Dickson worked at the Millennium Hotel as a kitchen hand and as an undertaker for Heritage Funeral Services. He developed bowel cancer and died on 4 February 2017.

== Career ==
Dickson started writing poetry as a teenager, initially influenced by Vladimir Mayakovsky and T. S. Eliot, and later Carlos Drummond de Andrade, Blaise Cendrars, and Francis Ponge. In the late 1960s, he was a co-editor of the literary journal Morepork. It was only in 1986 that he published his first collection of poems, What Happened on the Way to Oamaru. He was awarded the Robert Burns Fellowship by his alma mater in 1988. His next publication, Butan, was an audio cassette in 1991. His next collection of poems, Sleeper, was published by Auckland University Press in 1998. Most of the poems in Sleeper were written or started during his Robert Burns Fellowship. Dickson was the writer in residence at the University of Waikato in 2000. In 2009, Dickson published a CD entitled Plain Song. His final collection of poetry, Mister Hamilton (2016), was named after his cat. Dickson's Mister Hamilton was discussed on 3 December 2016 by poet Gregory O'Brien with Kim Hill on Radio New Zealand's Saturday Morning show.

== Works ==
=== Poetry ===
- What Happened on the Way to Oamaru (Untold Books, 1986)
- Sleeper (Auckland University Press, 1997)
- Mister Hamilton (Auckland University Press, 2016)

=== Audio recordings ===
- butan (1991)
- Plain Song (2009)
