= Dennis McEldowney =

New Zealand writer and editor

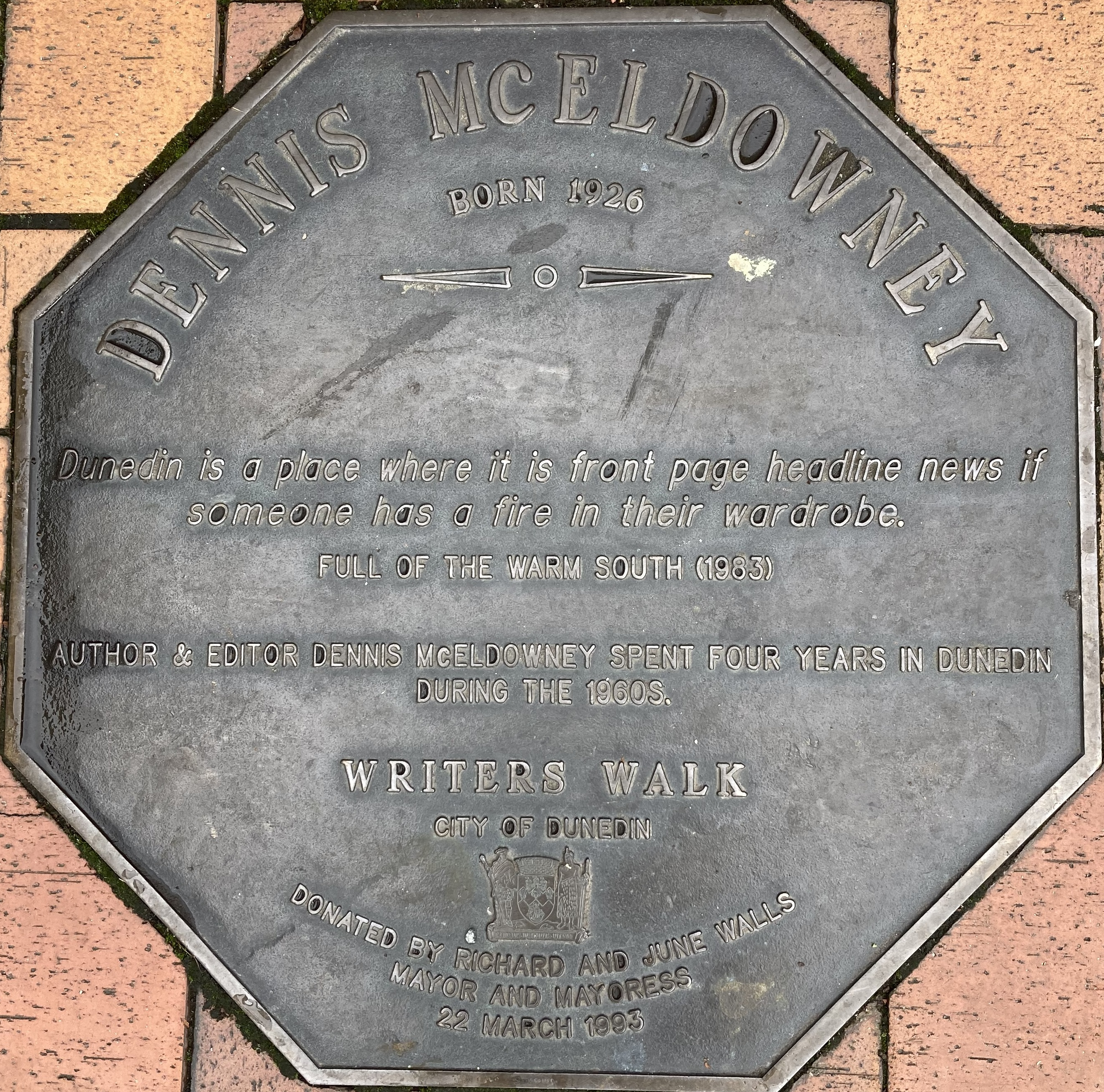
Plaque commemorating McEldowney on the Dunedin Writers' Walk

Richard Dennis McEldowney (29 January 1926 – 23 September 2003) was a New Zealand author and publisher. His best known work was The World Regained. Auto-biographical in nature, it described how he dealt with being an invalid due to having a Tetralogy of Fallot. This book won McEldowney the 1958 Hubert Church Memorial Prize.

== Early life ==
McEldowney was born on 29 January 1926 in Wanganui, and grew up in Christchurch. He was born with a congenital heart defect, Tetralogy of Fallot. Owing to this heart condition, McEldowney was an invalid until the age of 24. In 1950, he was operated on at Green Lane Hospital in Auckland.

== Education and career ==
Because of his medical condition, McEldowney was educated through a correspondence school. Eventually he took a clerical job at the School of Physical Education at the University of Otago in Dunedin. In 1966, he became the first editor of Auckland University Press and remained there until his retirement in 1986. Also in 1986, he was conferred an honorary LittD by the University of Auckland.

McEldowney died in Auckland in 2003. He is recognised with a plaque on the Dunedin Writers' Walk.

== Books ==
- The World Regained (1957)
- Donald Anderson: a Memoir (1966)
- Arguing With My Grandmother (1973)
- Frank Sargeson in His Time (1976)
- Full of the Warm South (1983)
- Shaking the Bee Tree (1992) - describes his marriage to Zoë Greenhough (1912-1990), who was also a "blue baby"
- Then and There: a 1970s diary (1995)
- A Press Achieved : the emergence of Auckland University Press, 1927–1972, with a brief epilogue to 1986 and a list of Auckland University College, University of Auckland, and Auckland University Press publications (2002)

== Articles ==
- "Publishing, Patronage, Literary Magazines", in: Terry Sturm, ed., The Oxford History of New Zealand Literature in English, Oxford University Press, 1991.
