= Kathryn van Beek =

New Zealand writer

- Born: Kathryn Elizabeth van Beek; 1980 (age 45–46); Christchurch, New Zealand
- Education: Victoria University of Wellington (MA)
- Occupations: Short story writer; playwright; children's writer; illustrator; musician
- Awards: Robert Burns Fellowship (2023)

Kathryn Elizabeth van Beek (born 1980) is a New Zealand short story writer, playwright, children's writer, illustrator and musician. Following an early career as a playwright, van Beek has since written and illustrated two children's books about her kitten Bruce and published a number of short stories for adults. She has also advocated for women who have experienced miscarriage and written on this topic. In 2023 she received the Robert Burns Fellowship.

== Life and career ==
Van Beek was born in Christchurch in 1980. She holds a bachelor's degree in writing for theatre from Unitec and a master's degree in scriptwriting from the International Institute of Modern Letters at Victoria University of Wellington, completed in 2002. In 2001 she won the Playmarket Young Playwrights Award and received a Mercury Theatre Trust scholarship.

In 2002, her play French Toast was the winner of the central region prize at the Playmarket Young Playwrights' Competition, and won Best Theatre at the New Zealand Fringe Festival. That year she established the production company 3girls6legs together with Natalie Hitchcock and Pia Midgley, and in 2003 they presented her play For Georgie. She was the bassist and singer-songwriter for the band Peachy Keen until it disbanded in 2005.

In 2018, she wrote and illustrated Bruce Finds a Home, a children's book based on her experience finding and adopting a one-day old kitten. She had originally set up a Facebook page to relate Bruce's activities. The book sold well and a sequel, Bruce Goes Outside, was published in 2020.

Van Beek also writes short stories for adults. She received the 2015 Headland journal prize for her short story "Frangipani". Her short story "Emotional Support Animal" won third place in the Sunday Star-Times short story competition in 2018. In 2020, she published a collection of short stories for adults, Pet. A review in The New Zealand Herald called it "both charming and brutal".

In 2020, van Beek wrote Misconceptions, a 10-part web documentary series for The New Zealand Herald about miscarriage. In 2023, she was awarded the Robert Burns Fellowship. She said she intended to use her time on the residency to write a second collection of short stories. During her residency she judged the University of Otago's annual creative writing competition. She is one of three editors of the 2024 essay collection Otherhood, featuring essays by people who are not mothers.

== Personal life ==
In 2021, as a direct result of van Beek writing to her local MP and starting a petition that attracted 7,000 signatures, New Zealand's law was changed to entitle women and their partners to bereavement leave after experiencing miscarriage.

She is a cousin of playwright and actress Jackie van Beek.
