= Holly Walker =

New Zealand politician

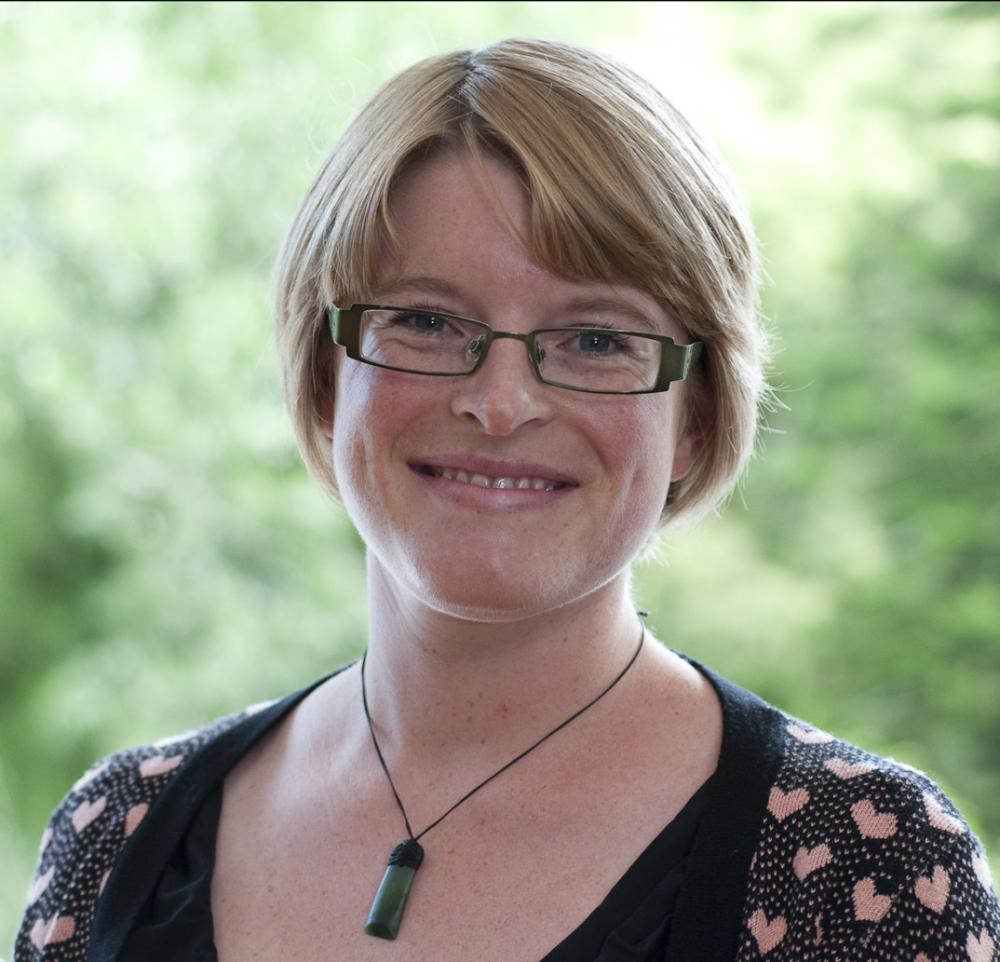
- Walker in 2011

Member of the New Zealand Parliament for Green party list
- In office 2011 – 2014
- Succeeded by: James Shaw

Personal details
- Born: 15 November 1982 (age 44)
- Party: Green
- Spouse: David Haines
- Children: 2
- Education: University of Otago; Oxford University
- Website: Official website

Holly Ruth Walker (born 15 November 1982) is a New Zealand writer, public servant, and former politician.

Walker was elected to the New Zealand House of Representatives from 2011 to 2014, as a Green Party list MP. After leaving Parliament, she has worked in the public service, as deputy director of The Helen Clark Foundation, and as a writer and book reviewer.

== Early life and family ==
Walker was born in Lower Hutt in 1982. She was raised by a mother on the Domestic Purposes Benefit and attended Waterloo School, Hutt Intermediate School and Hutt Valley High School, where she was deputy head girl.

Walker is in a civil union with David Haines. They have two daughters.

== University and early political work ==
From 2001 she studied at the University of Otago, graduating with a BA (Hons) in English and Politics, as well as winning a Blue for her achievements with the Otago University Debating Society. In 2005 she was the editor of student magazine Critic Te Ārohi, the year's winner of the Aotearoa Student Press Association's award for Best Student Publication. In September 2005 Critic's annual "Offensive Issue" included a fictional diary of a man who used drugs to stupefy and rape women. The Office of Film and Literature Classification banned the issue in early 2006, after Walker's tenure as editor had ended. At the time of the ban she said the article was "defendable in that it highlights a very important issue", but when Critic interviewed her in 2012 she called it "a mistake to publish that particular article the way that we did".

She moved from Dunedin to Wellington and in 2006 began working as a media adviser to the Green Party. The next year she moved to the Office of Treaty Settlements, working as an analyst. 2007 also saw her named a Rhodes scholar, leading to a master's degree in Developmental Studies from the University of Oxford, awarded in 2009.

After two years in Oxford, Walker returned to New Zealand and the Green Party. She spent 2009–11 as a Political and Media Adviser to the party's MPs, leading a poverty research project for the party, and she co-convened the Young Greens of Aotearoa in 2010.

== Member of Parliament ==
New Zealand Parliament
Years	Term	Electorate	List	Party
2011–2014	50th	List	12	Green

Placed twelfth on the Green Party list for the 2011 election, and selected as the party's Hutt South candidate Walker was elected to Parliament as a list MP when the Greens won 14 seats. She gave her maiden speech on 15 February 2012. In that speech, she acknowledged former co-leader Rod Donald as inspiring her early political activism when she viewed, at high school, a documentary about the 1981 Springbok Tour protests.

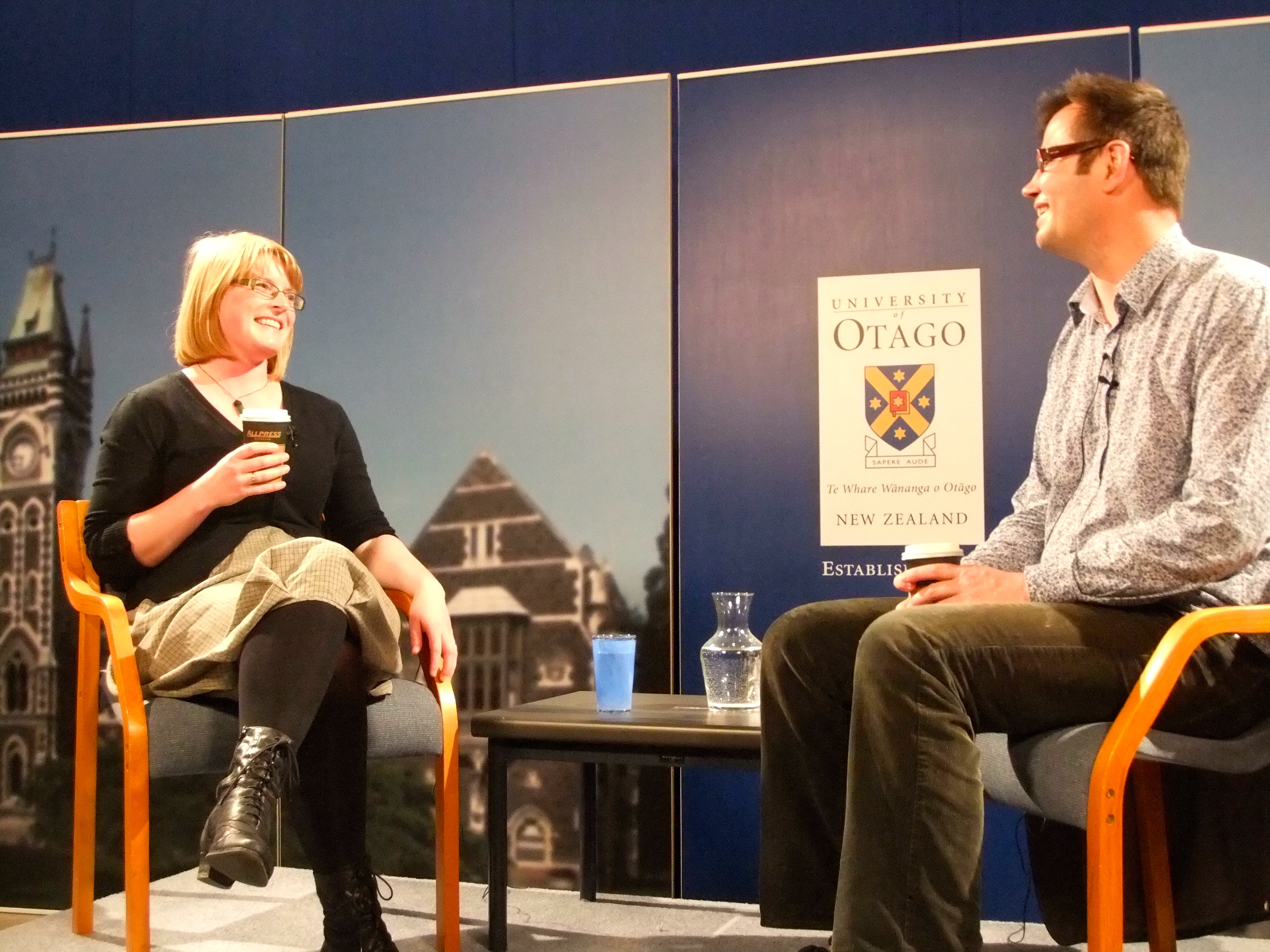
Walker talking to Bryce Edwards at University of Otago Vote Chat in 2011

From 2011 to 2014, Walker was the Green Party spokesperson for housing, electoral reform, children, open government, arts culture and heritage, and students. She promoted the Lobbying Disclosure Bill, which was drawn from the ballot of private members' bills on 5 April 2012 and introduced to Parliament. The bill had originally been written by Sue Kedgley, but was narrowed in scope under Walker. The bill was modelled on a Canadian law, with similar legislation in Australia and America also being an influence. Its intention was to make interactions between MPs and lobbyists more transparent. It passed its first reading but was rejected by a parliamentary select committee in August 2013.

In January 2013 Walker unveiled the Green Party's Home for Life scheme, aimed at getting low income earners into their own homes. Her first child was born while she was a member of parliament in late 2013.

Three months before the 2014 general election, Walker withdrew from the Green Party list, citing "a recent unexpected change in my family life". She had been placed twelfth – high enough to be returned to Parliament. She remained the party's (unsuccessful) candidate for Hutt South, campaigning only for the party vote, and did not rule out a return to politics. Her final parliamentary speech lamented the difficulties in juggling two "24-hours-a-day, 7-days-a-week job[s]" of being a member of Parliament and being a parent. Walker's memoir, The Whole Intimate Mess: Motherhood, Politics, and Women's Writing, published in 2017 revealed that the reasons for her retirement were "post-natal anxiety, a chronically ill husband, and domestic unrest."

== Later career ==
After stepping down as a Green MP, Walker worked at the Office of the Children's Commissioner, and began a blog reviewing books written by women. She has written that she wishes to return to public life when family commitments allow her to:

One day – when time and family permits – I hope to step back onto a public stage, whether in politics or in some other sphere, if for no other reason than I’m an A-type personality, and I like it. Until then, I’ll fiercely support and encourage other women to combine parenting and politics if they want to and think they can. More representative parliaments make better decisions, so we need as many mothers in there as we can get. But I’ll also tell them straight: it’s damn hard. And if it’s too hard, it’s ok. The world’s fight is being fought on many fronts, and front and centre is only one of them.

In 2015 she first contributed to website The Spinoff, reviewing books, interviewing authors, and writing other articles. In 2016 she launched a parenting podcast, Dear Mamas, co-hosted with Emily Writes, and contributed book reviews to Radio New Zealand's Nine to Noon programme. She completed a Doctor of Philosophy at the Victoria University of Wellington International Institute of Modern Letters in 2022.

Walker was deputy executive director of The Helen Clark Foundation from 2020 to 2022. After leaving that role she returned to work in the public service.

== Books ==
Walker's first book, The Whole Intimate Mess: Motherhood, Politics, and Women's Writing, was published by Bridget Williams Books (BWB) in June 2017. It describes Walker's experiences while trying to combine motherhood and her career as an MP, including post-natal depression and instances of intentional self-injury.

With Kathy Errington, the former executive director of The Helen Clark Foundation, Walker edited a collection of essays, Reconnecting Aotearoa: Loneliness and Connection in the Age of Social Distance, which was released by BWB in November 2023.
