= Robert Lord (playwright) =

New Zealand playwright

- Born: Robert Lord; 18 July 1945; Rotorua, New Zealand
- Died: 7 January 1992 (aged 46); Dunedin, New Zealand
- Occupation: Playwright

Robert Lord (18 July 1945 – 7 January 1992) was the first New Zealand professional playwright. He was one of the first New Zealand playwrights to have plays produced abroad since Merton Hodge in the 1930s (following Bruce Mason and James K. Baxter).

== Biography ==
Lord was born in Rotorua in 1945, to parents Richard and Bebe Lord, and had an older brother. His father's job took the family around the country and they lived in various cities in New Zealand while he was growing up, including Auckland, Hamilton, Wellington, Christchurch and Invercargill. Lord attended schools in Auckland, Hamilton and Southland Boys' High School in Invercargill.

Lord was educated at three tertiary institutions, first the University of Otago, then Victoria University of Wellington (1965–68) and after that, to gain his teaching qualification, Wellington Teachers College. In 1969, he won the Katherine Mansfield Young Writers Award. At this time in New Zealand, professional theatre was just beginning, and in Wellington where Lord was, Downstage Theatre had opened in 1964 and Unity Theatre was active.

Victoria University started a Drama Department in 1970 which Lord attended at age 25, and his lecturer recounts meeting Lord for the first time:

"an imposingly tall man - well over six feet, with light brown hair, a slight stoop and a manner that could switch from being serious and earnest to riotously funny in the course of a single sentence." Philip Mann

For a period of time Lord worked backstage at Downstage Theatre, while teaching school and also studying drama and writing plays at night. Lord's first full-length play was It Isn’t Cricket (1971) and it was selected for the inaugural Australian National Playwrights Conference in 1973 which he attended. Following up from that event alongside Nonnita Rees, Judy Russell and Ian Fraser he formed Playmarket to increase the number of plays by New Zealand writers available for New Zealand theatres.

In 1974 Lord travelled to New York City on an Arts Council travel bursary, and stayed there for several years. He signed with the New York agent Gilbert Parker from the William Morris Agency. Plays from the 1980s include High As a Kite (premiered at Downstage, a.k.a. The Kite Play), Country Cops, this is a revision of Well Hung (1985) and was presented at Trinity Square Repertory in New York. Unfamiliar Steps (1983) was later called Bert and Maisy and was adapted for television in 1988. Robert Lord directed the premiere co-operative production of The Affair at the Globe Theatre, Dunedin, in 1987.Glorious Ruins was presented at Circa Theatre in Wellington in April 1991 and at the Fortune Theatre, Dunedin, in June of that year. His play The Travelling Squirrel is based in New York and was written in 1987 although not performed in a New Zealand mainstage theatre until 2015. China Wars was presented in a co-operative production staged at the Globe Theatre in Dunedin in 1988 and at Bats Theatre in Wellington in 2002. Broken Circle, a one-act play, received its world premiere at Studio 77 in Wellington in 2004.

In 1987 he returned to New Zealand to take up the Robert Burns Fellowship in Dunedin. He was involved with several New Zealand theatres during his career: Mercury Theatre, Auckland (writer-in-residence, 1974); Circa Theatre and Downstage Theatre, Wellington; and Fortune Theatre, Dunedin (writer-in-residence, 1990).

The play Joyful and Triumphant was commissioned by Circa Theatre and premiered there as part of the New Zealand Festival programme in 1992, following which it toured Australia. Lord died just before it opened so never got to see it on stage. In 1992 Joyful and Triumphant received the following Chapman Tripp Theatre Awards: Production of the Year, Director of the Year, and New Zealand Playwright of the Year. The play tells a story about a small-town New Zealand family over 40 years in a series of Christmas Day scenes. Circa Theatre chose Joyful and Triumpant as part of their 40th anniversary celebrations.

He also wrote one-act plays, radio plays and screenplays. His plays have been produced or published in New Zealand, Australia and the United States. He is the only New Zealand dramatist to have had works programmed by major off-Broadway and regional American repertory companies. He is also the only New Zealand dramatist to have had a production of their work in a major Toronto theatre.

Lord died in 1992, aged 46, from cancer and HIV/AIDS complications.

== Plays ==
- 1971: It Isn’t Cricket
- 1972: Balance of Payments
- 1972: Meeting Place
- 1974: Well Hung
- 1974: Heroes and Butterflies
- 1975: Glitter and Spit
- 1978: High as a Kite
- 1983: Unfamiliar Steps (was later called Bert and Maisy, and was adapted for television in 1988)
- 1985: Country Cops (a revision of Well Hung, 1985)
- 1987: The Affair
- 1992: Joyful and Triumphant

== Film and television ==
- 1971: Survey - The Day We Landed on The Most Perfect Planet In the Universe - Writer of Narration - Television
- 1981: Pictures - Writer - Film
- 1987: Peppermint Twist - Writer - Television
- 1988: Bert and Maisy - Writer, Creator - Television
- 1993: Joyful and Triumphant - Original Writer, Writer - Television

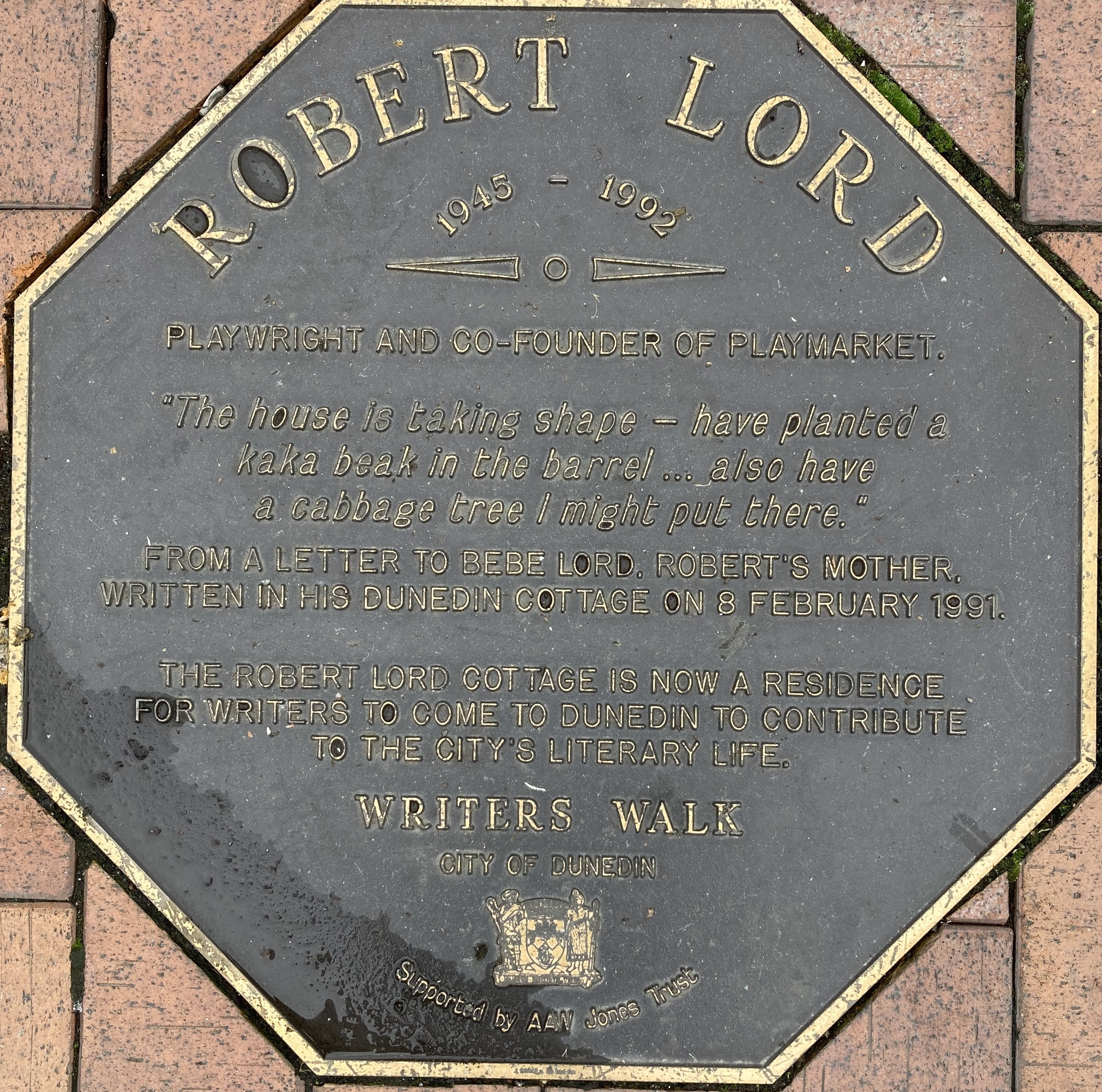
Lord's plaque on the Dunedin Writers' Walk

== Awards and honours ==
- 1969: Katherine Mansfield Young Writers Award
- 1987: Robert Burns Fellowship

== Legacy ==
Lord's home in Titan Street, Dunedin, was left in trust as a rent-free writer’s residence. Administered by the Robert Lord Writers Cottage Trust, it hosted its first writers in residence in 2003. Lord has a plaque on the Dunedin Writers' Walk, featuring a quote from a letter to his mother.
