= Dianne Ruth Pettis =

- Born: 1955; Waipawa, Hawke’s Bay, New Zealand
- Died: 13 May 2008 (aged 52–53); Otago Peninsula
- Writing career
- Genres: fiction, journalist
- Notable works: ‘’Like Small Bones’’, The First Touch of Light

Dianne Ruth Pettis (1955 – 13 May 2008) was a novelist and journalist from New Zealand.

== Background ==
Pettis was born in Waipawa, Hawke's Bay, New Zealand. In addition to her novels, poetry, and short stories, she worked as a journalist, a script writer for the Natural History Unit and a communications manager.

== Works ==
=== Novels ===
- Like Small Bones (2004)
- The First Touch of Light (2009)

=== Poetry ===
Pettis' poetry and short fiction have been included in Landfall, Sport and Takahe, and broadcast on Radio New Zealand. Her work was also included in:

- Under Flagstaff: and Anthology of Dunedin Poetry (2004), edited by Robin Law
- Swings and Roundabouts (2008), edited by Emma Neale

== Awards ==
Like Small Bones, was shortlisted for the Best First Book section in the Asia Pacific region for the Commonwealth Writers’ Prize. In 2006 she was awarded the Robert Burns Fellowship, a literary residency at the University of Otago in Dunedin, New Zealand.
