= O. E. Middleton =

New Zealand short-story writer

O.E. Middleton
- Born: 25 March 1925; Christchurch, New Zealand
- Died: 14 August 2010 (aged 85)
- Writing career
- Genre: Short Stories
- Notable awards: Robert Burns Fellowship

Osman Edward Middleton (born 25 March 1925 in Christchurch, died 14 August 2010 in Dunedin) was a New Zealand writer of short stories, described as belonging to the vernacular critical realist tradition of Frank Sargeson. He was the brother of noted New Zealand novelist Ian Middleton, and like him also blind from middle age. Mentored by Frank Sargeson in Auckland in the late 1950s, he moved to Dunedin to take up the Robert Burns Fellowship (1970) at the University of Otago.

Prominent New Zealand author Janet Frame once said, "O. E. Middleton is a fine writer ... He's the only NZ writer who has made me weep over a story — one called The Stone in a volume of that title." Middleton was the recipient of several awards, including the Hubert Church Award and the 2006 Janet Frame Literary Award. His Selected Stories shared first prize for Fiction in the New Zealand Book Awards in 1976.

A plaque featuring a quote from Middleton's 1970 Notebook was unveiled in February 2022 as part of the Dunedin Writer's Walk.

== Works ==
- Six Poems (Wellington: Handcraft Press, 1951)
- Short Stories (Wellington: Handcraft Press, 1954)
- The Stone and Other Stories (Auckland: Pilgrim Press, 1959)
- A Walk on the Beach (London: Joseph, 1964)
- The Loners (Wellington: Square & Circle, 1972)
- Selected Stories (Dunedin: McIndoe, 1975)
- Confessions of an Ocelot; and Not for a Seagull (Dunedin: McIndoe, 1979).
- The Big Room and Other Stories (Wellington: Steele Roberts, 1998)
- Beyond The Breakwater - Stories 1948-1998 (Dunedin: Otago University Press, 2008)
