= Queenstown suppressed indecency case =

Sexual assault case by a New Zealand celebrity, 2011–2014

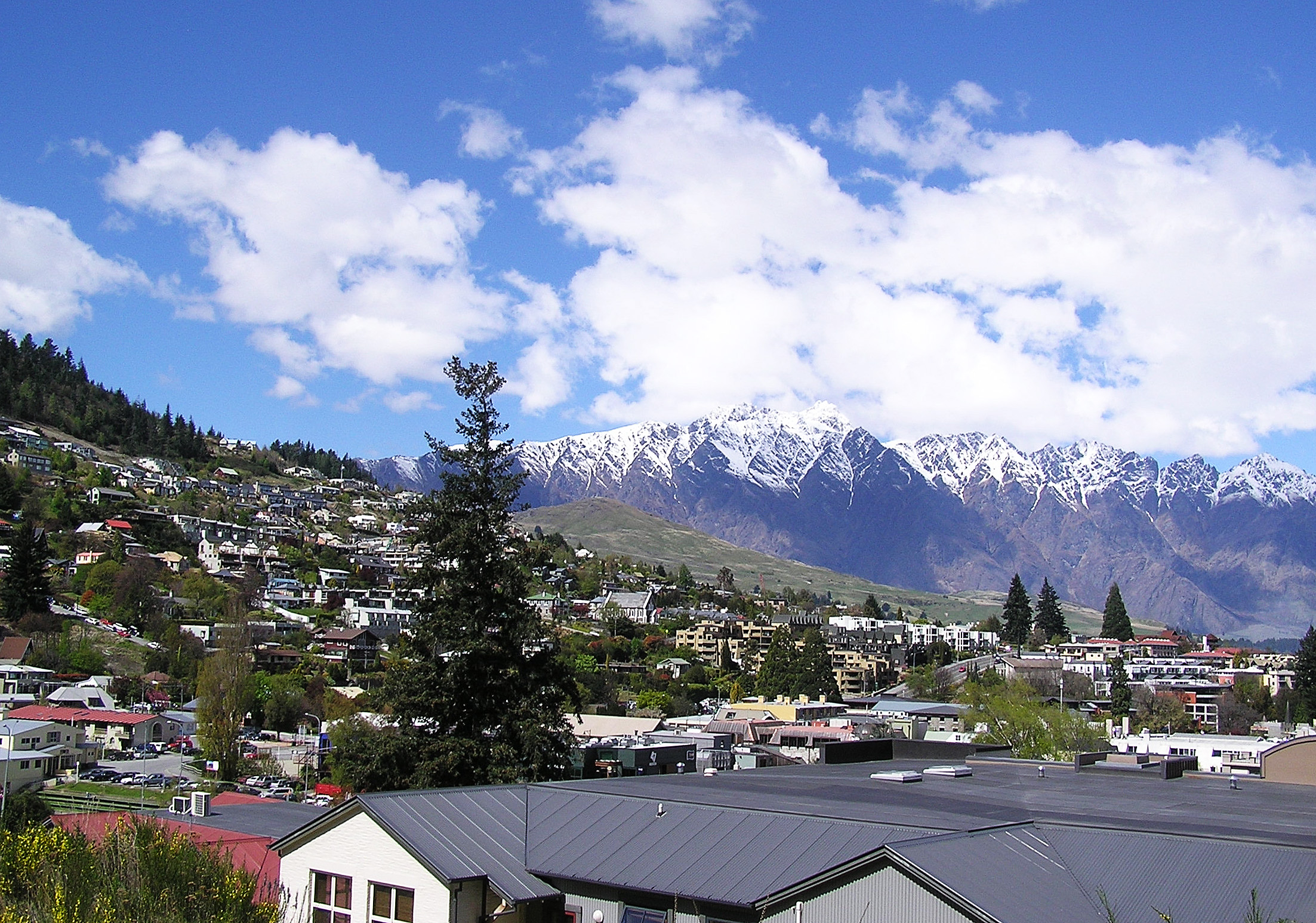
Queenstown

The Queenstown suppressed indecency case was a police investigation and court case in New Zealand from 2011 to 2014 in which a celebrity was accused of, pleaded guilty to and was convicted of "performing an indecent act intended to insult or offend" against a woman in Queenstown and later discharged without conviction and given permanent name suppression. The case fuelled discussion and controversy in New Zealand over the use by courts of suppression orders to protect the identity of perpetrators of higher social status.

== Alleged event ==
The female complainant (later named as Louise Hemsley) said the man was a friend of her husband, and visited their home over a three-year period. She said the offence took place in her own home, in November 2011. On this visit, the man grabbed her, groping and tongue kissing her, and placed his hand inside her underwear, then as she pushed him away, he placed her hand on to his penis. She said her husband then arrived home, and she left as the man made a non-verbal mimicry of an oral sex act at her.

== Complaint and committal for trial ==
The complainant said she was interviewed by police a few days later and on their advice telephoned the defendant. The defendant was originally going to be referred to a diversion programme. The man appeared in the Alexandra court in May 2012 where he was committed for trial at the Dunedin District Court for indecent assault.

== Trial and guilty plea ==
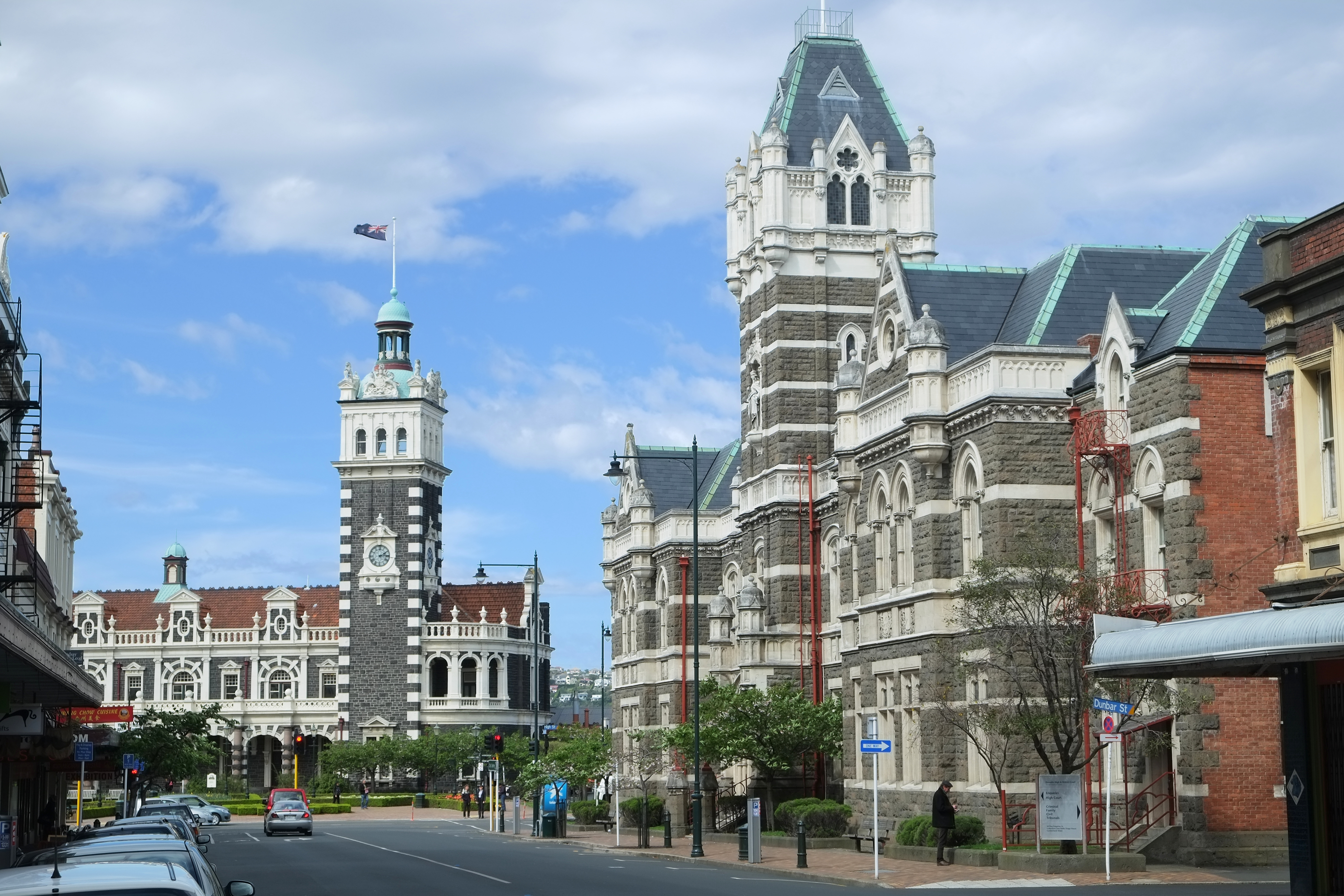
Dunedin courthouse (right)

In August 2012, the accused appeared in the Dunedin District Court and pleaded guilty to a charge of performing an indecent act intended to insult or offend, a charge under Section 126 the Crimes Act 1961. The man was convicted and ordered to pay $5000 emotional harm reparation and $1500 in counselling costs.

== Appeal ==
In September 2013, the defendant appealed to the New Zealand Court of Appeal in Wellington against the conviction and for permanent name suppression. The defendant's lawyer argued that his client had pleaded guilty to avoid a public trial assuming he would be offered diversion or a discharge without conviction. The appeal court referred the case back to the Dunedin District Court.

== Discharge ==
The man re-appeared in Dunedin District Court in March 2014 where he was ordered to pay $6500 to the complainant and discharged without conviction with a permanent suppression order preventing the publication (in New Zealand) of the man's name, occupation and former occupations, anything likely to lead to his identity, or cast speculation on any other person of a similar class or type.

== Name suppression controversy ==
The complainant felt that the verdict was "not really a win" and that the defendant was "a dirty bastard and people should know."

There was public disquiet in Otago after the verdict.

Following news of Operation Yewtree in Britain and the subsequent trial of Australian entertainer Rolf Harris, a member of the New Zealand Parliament, Maggie Barry, described a groping by Harris during a studio interview she conducted in her previous broadcasting career. Retired parliamentarian Rodney Hide taunted her in a newspaper column, urging her to use her parliamentary privilege to breach the name suppression order.

== Naming of the defendant on Internet ==
Fuelled by the Harris case, people in New Zealand began distributing the defendant's name on Internet sites including Facebook. The man was also named in Australia by an Australian blogger. New Zealand law professor Mark Henaghan said New Zealanders would not be breaching the suppression by reading such information, but that the situation showed the difficulty of enforcing suppression orders in the modern age and across borders.

== Legal threat over suppression breaches ==
In July 2014, the defendant said that everyone in his home town knew he was the "prominent man" described in the media and that he had been fired from a job by an employer who had heard that he was the defendant. He said his lawyer was "on the warpath" for those who had published his name online.

== Defendant meets Leader of the Opposition ==
While campaigning for the 2014 New Zealand general election, New Zealand Labour Party leader David Cunliffe met the defendant. Cunliffe said he had arranged for the person to meet a Labour candidate but that he had no idea about the person's controversial background and that had he known, no such meeting would have taken place.

== Complainant's waiver of her own name suppression ==
The complainant waived her right to automatic name suppression in October 2014, enabling her to tell her story, and her name (Louise Hemsley) became public.

== Naming of the defendant by former MP ==
Tau Henare, a retired member of the New Zealand Parliament, appeared in Henderson District Court in December 2014 charged with knowingly breaching suppression orders under the Criminal Procedure Act. The charge related to an alleged posting on social media in 2014 of the name of the defendant in the Queenstown suppressed indecency case, when the defendant's identity was subject to a suppression order.

== See also ==
- PJS v News Group Newspapers Ltd, a similar case in the UK
