= Warren Dibble =

New Zealand poet and playwright (1930–2014)

- Born: Warren Ambrose Dibble; 21 February 1931; Palmerston North, New Zealand
- Died: 27 July 2014 (aged 83); Sydney, NSW, Australia
- Occupations: Playwright, poet

Warren Ambrose Dibble (21 February 1931 – 27 July 2014) was a New Zealand poet and playwright.

== Early life and family ==
Dibble was born in Palmerston North on 21 February 1931, the son of Victor Thomas Dibble and Alma Dibble (née Edgecombe). His father was secretary of the Manawatu Racing Club, and committed suicide by gunshot in December 1932, having suffered from depression and what would now be understood as post-traumatic stress disorder following his service in World War I.

== Writing career ==
Dibble was awarded the Robert Burns Fellowship from the University of Otago in 1969. Ralph Hotere, who was the Frances Hodgkins Fellow at Otago also in 1969, incorporated some of Dibble's poems into his artwork. Dibble wrote plays for television, theatre and radio, including Killing of Kane, based on the deeds of Tītokowaru in Taranaki in the 1860s, the anti-Vietnam war theatrical cartoon Operation Pigstick, the one-off tele-drama Double Exposure, Lord, Dismiss Us… and Lines to M.

Dibble moved to Sydney in the 1970s and died there in 2014.
