= Karen Nairn =

New Zealand geographer

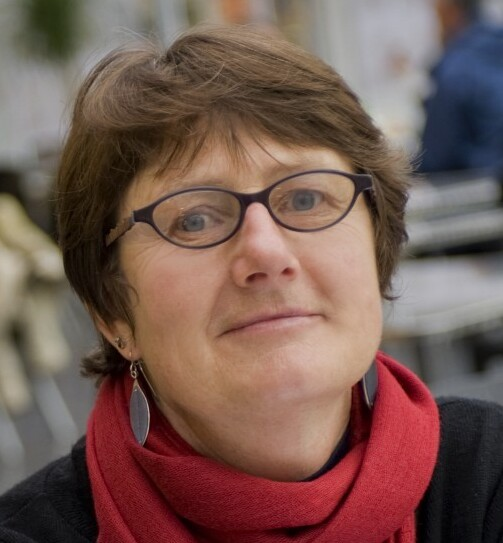
- Nairn in 2008

Academic background
- Education: University of Canterbury, University of Waikato
- Theses: Quiet students in geography classrooms (1994); Disciplining identities: gender, geography and the culture of fieldtrips (1998)
- Doctoral advisor: Robyn Longhurst, Lex Chalmers, Richard Bedford
- Other advisors: Adrienne Alton-Lee, Robert Garth Cant

Karen Marie Nairn is a New Zealand academic, and is a full professor of education at the University of Otago, specialising in youth-centred research.

== Academic career ==
Nairn was a high school geography teacher interested in environmental issues, before entering academia. Nairn completed a Master of Arts in geography at the University of Canterbury in 1994, and then went on to do a PhD titled Disciplining identities: gender, geography and the culture of fieldtrips at the University of Waikato. Nairn then joined the faculty of the University of Otago, rising to associate professor in 2014 and full professor in 2022.

Nairn's research focus is young people and social movements. Nairn was the lead researcher on a 2017 Marsden grant about young people's engagement in social movements, with collaborators Joanna Kidman, Judith Sligo, Carisa R. Showden, and Kyle R. Matthews. This work led to the publication of the book Fierce Hope: Youth Activism in Aotearoa in 2022, which covers youth-led groups working in areas such as indigenous land rights, sexual violence and social inequality. This was the second Marsden grant Nairn has received, having published Children of Rogernomics: A Neoliberal Generation Leaves School in 2012 from an earlier Marsden-funded research project on the impact of neoliberal reform in New Zealand. Nairn has also researched the impact of a Year 12 (last year of high school) leadership programme for young women.

Nairn spoke about youth activism and Ihumātao alongside Qiane Matata-Sipu at the 2023 Dunedin Writers and Readers Festival.

== Selected works ==
=== Books ===
- Nairn, Karen; Higgins, Jane; Sligo, Judith, eds. (2012). Children of Rogernomics: A Neoliberal Generation Leaves School. Otago University Press. ISBN 978-1-877578-18-2.
- Nairn, Karen; Sligo, Judith; Showden, Carisa R.; Matthews, Kyle R.; Kidman, Joanna, eds. (December 2022). Fierce Hope. Youth Activism in Aotearoa. Bridget Williams Books. ISBN 9781990046681.

=== Journal articles ===
- Nairn, K., Showden, C. R., Matthews, K. R., Kidman, J., & Sligo, J. (2025). Scaffolding Collective Hope and Agency in Youth Activist Groups: ‘I get hope through action’. The Sociological Review, 73(2), 431-448. https://doi.org/10.1177/00380261241245546
- Showden, C. R., Nairn, K., & Matthews, K. R. (2022). ‘So people wake up, what are we gonna do?’: From paralysis to action in decolonizing activism. Ethnicities, 22(5), 663–684. https://doi.org/10.1177/14687968211062916
- Nairn, K., Kidman, J., Matthews, K. R., Showden, C. R., & Parker, A. (2021). Living In and Out of Time: Youth-led activism in Aotearoa New Zealand. Time & Society, 30(2), 247-269. https://doi.org/10.1177/0961463x21989858
- Nairn, K., Showden, C. R., Sligo, J., Matthews, K. R., & Kidman, J. (2020). Consent Requires a Relationship: Rethinking group consent and its timing in ethnographic research. International Journal of Social Research Methodology, 23(6), 719-731. https://doi.org/10.1080/13645579.2020.1760562
- Jenny Cameron; Nairn, Karen Marie; Jane Higgins (2009). "Demystifying Academic Writing: Reflections on Emotions, Know-How and Academic Identity". Journal of Geography in Higher Education. 33 (2): 269–284. doi:10.1080/03098260902734943. Wikidata Q124816256.
- Nairn, Karen Marie; Jenny Munro; Smith, Briar Anne (2005). "A counter-narrative of a 'failed' interview". Qualitative Research. 5 (2): 221–244. doi:10.1177/1468794105050836. Wikidata Q124816257.
- Nairn, Karen Marie; Jenny Cameron; Anakin, Megan; Adisorn Juntrasook; Rob Wass; Sligo, Judith Louise; Catherine Morrison (2014). "Negotiating the challenge of collaborative writing: learning from one writing group's mutiny". Higher Education Research and Development. 34 (3): 596–608. doi:10.1080/07294360.2014.973383. Wikidata Q124816056.
- Nairn, Karen Marie; Ruth Panelli; Jaleh McCormack (2003). "Destabilizing Dualisms: Young People's Experiences of Rural and Urban Environments". Childhood. 10 (1): 9–42. doi:10.1177/0907568203010001002. Wikidata Q124816252.
- Nairn, Karen Marie; Jane Higgins; Brigid Thompson; Megan Anderson; Nedra Fu (2006). "'It's Just Like the Teenage Stereotype, You Go Out and Drink and Stuff': Hearing from Young People who Don't Drink". Journal of Youth Studies. 9 (3): 287–304. doi:10.1080/13676260600805655. Wikidata Q111222456.
- Nairn, Karen Marie (2005). "The Problems of Utilizing 'Direct Experience' in Geography Education". Journal of Geography in Higher Education. 29 (2): 293–309. doi:10.1080/03098260500130635. Wikidata Q124816250.
- Carisa R. Showden; Emma Barker-Clarke; Sligo, Judith Louise; Nairn, Karen Marie (2023). "The connective is communal: hybrid activism in online & offline spaces". Social Movement Studies: 1–20. doi:10.1080/14742837.2023.2171387. Wikidata Q124816043.
