= Health Education Research =

- Discipline: Health education
- Language: English
- Edited by: Michael Eriksen

Publication details
- History: 1986-present
- Publisher: Oxford University Press
- Frequency: Bimonthly
- Impact factor: 1.667 (2015)

Standard abbreviations
- ISO 4: Health Educ. Res.

Indexing
- CODEN: HERPE2
- ISSN: 0268-1153 (print); 1465-3648 (web)
- LCCN: sn87022130
- OCLC no.: 12824066

Links
- Journal homepage; Online access; Online archive

Health Education Research is a bimonthly peer-reviewed academic journal covering health education. It was established in 1986 and is published by Oxford University Press. It is associated with the International Union for Health Promotion and Education. The editor-in-chief is Michael Eriksen (Georgia State University). According to the Journal Citation Reports, the journal has a 2015 impact factor of 1.667.
