= Christine Johnston (writer) =

New Zealand writer

- Born: 4 January 1950 (age 76); Dunedin, New Zealand
- Writing career
- Genres: Fiction, young adult
- Notable work: Blessed Art Thou Among Women
- Notable awards: Heinemann Read Fiction Award

Christine Johnston (born 4 January 1950) is a novelist from New Zealand.

== Background ==
Johnston was born 4 January 1950 in Dunedin, New Zealand. She was educated at St Dominic's College and the University of Otago.

== Works ==
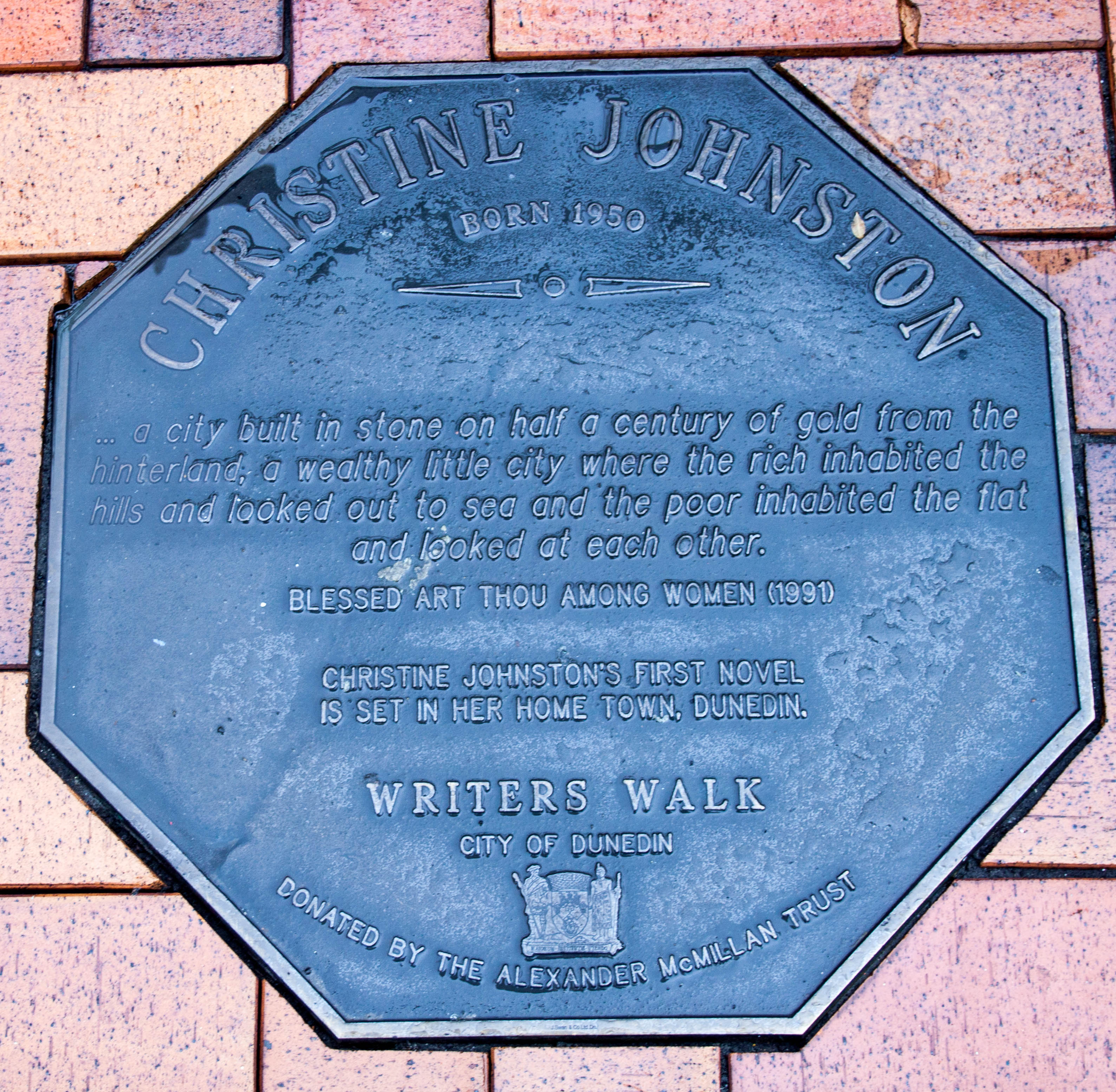
Christine Johnstone memorial plaque, part of Writers Walk in Dunedin

Johnston writes fiction for adults and young adults, both novels and short stories. Her fiction has been broadcast on national radio and appeared in journals, including Landfall, Metro, and Sport. Her writing is often set in the suburbs and towns of New Zealand and deals with everyday aspects of life and interactions, including the Themes also included childhood, adolescence and adulthood.

=== Novels ===
- Blessed Art Though Among Women (1991)
- Goodbye Molly McGuire (1994), young adult novel
- The Haunting of Lara Lawson (1995), young adult novel
- A Friend of Jack McGuire (1996), young adult novel
- The Shark Bell (2002)

=== Short stories ===
- The End of the Century (1999)

Her reflections on Catholisim are included in the book, The Source of the Song.

== Awards ==
Her novel, Blessed Art Though Among Women, won the Heinemann Reed Fiction Award in 1990. In 1994 she was awarded the Robert Burns Fellowship, a literary residency at the University of Otago in Dunedin, New Zealand. She was the winner of the Unity Books Very Short Story Collection in 2003.
