= Robert Burns Fellowship =

Literary award in New Zealand

- Genre: New Zealand literature
- Begins: 1958
- Frequency: Annual
- Venue: University of Otago
- Country: New Zealand
- Website: www.otago.ac.nz/humanities/about/otago-fellows/robert-burns-fellowship

The Robert Burns Fellowship is a New Zealand literary residency. Established in 1958 to coincide with bicentennial celebrations of the birth of Robert Burns, it is often claimed to be New Zealand's premier literary residency. The list of past fellows includes many of New Zealand's most notable 20th and 21st century writers.

== Overview and history ==
The fellowship was established in 1958 by an anonymous group of citizens of Dunedin, including notably Charles Brasch and his cousins Esmond, Dora and Mary de Beer. Its purpose is "to encourage and promote imaginative New Zealand literature, liberally interpreted to include writers of genres such as literary biography, autobiography and literary criticism". It marked 200 years since the birth of Robert Burns, and also the service provided by the Burns family to the development of the Otago region, including Thomas Burns who was a nephew of the poet. It was the first literary fellowship in New Zealand.

Michael King, who received the fellowship in 1998, said at the time: "If the Burns Fellowship did not exist, New Zealand literature might be a decade or so behind the place where it is now. Some things simply wouldn't have been written." As an example, he noted that Janet Frame, one of New Zealand's best-known authors, was only able to stay in New Zealand and continue to write because of the resources provided by the fellowship.

The fellowship is based at the University of Otago. It provides a stipend to recipients for between six months to a year, as well as an office on campus.

To commemorate the 50th anniversary of the fellowship, a collection titled Nurse to the Imagination: Fifty years of the Robert Burns Fellowship was launched in October 2008, along with commemorations to coincide with Dunedin's 2008 Arts Festival.

== Robert Burns Fellows ==
The writers to have held the fellowship are listed below:

- 1959 Ian Cross
- 1960 Maurice Duggan
- 1961 John Caselberg
- 1962 R. A. K. Mason
- 1963 Maurice Shadbolt
- 1964 Maurice Gee
- 1965 Janet Frame
- 1966–67 James K. Baxter
- 1968 Ruth Dallas
- 1969 Warren Dibble
- 1970 O. E. Middleton
- 1971 Noel Hilliard
- 1972 Ian Wedde
- 1973 Graham Billing
- 1974 Hone Tuwhare
- 1975 Witi Ihimaera
- 1976 Sam Hunt
- 1977 Keri Hulme
- 1977–78 Roger Hall
- 1978 Peter Olds
- 1979 Michael A. Noonan
- 1980 Philip Temple
- 1981–82 William Sewell
- 1983 Rawiri Paratene
- 1984 Brian Turner
- 1985–86 Cilla McQueen
- 1987 Robert Lord
- 1988 John Dickson
- 1989 Renée
- 1990 David Eggleton
- 1991 Lynley Hood
- 1992 Owen Marshall
- 1993 Stuart Hoar
- 1994 Christine Johnston
- 1995 Elspeth Sandys
- 1996 Bernadette Hall
- 1997 Paddy Richardson
- 1998–99 Michael King
- 1999 Paula Boock
- 2000 James Norcliffe
- 2001 Jo Randerson
- 2002 Alison Wong
- 2003 Nick Ascroft
- 2003 Sarah Quigley
- 2004 Katherine Duignan
- 2005–06 Catherine Chidgey
- 2006 Dianne Ruth Pettis
- 2007 Laurence Fearnley
- 2008 Sue Wootton
- 2009 Michael Harlow
- 2010 Michele Powles
- 2011 Fiona Farrell
- 2012 Emma Neale
- 2013 David Howard
- 2014 Majella Cullinane
- 2015 Louise Wallace
- 2016 Victor Rodger
- 2017 Craig Cliff
- 2018 Rhian Gallagher
- 2019 Emily Duncan
- 2020 John Newton
- 2021 Becky Manawatu
- 2022 Albert Belz
- 2023 Kathryn van Beek
- 2024 Mikaela Nyman
- 2025 Octavia Cade
- 2026 Rachel O'Neill (poet)

== See also ==
- University of Otago College of Education / Creative New Zealand Children's Writer in Residence
