= Susie Ferguson =

Radio presenter/journalist in New Zealand

Susie Ferguson is a Scottish radio presenter and journalist based in New Zealand.

== Early life and career ==
Ferguson was born and raised in Scotland, and at the age of 18 moved to Stratford-upon-Avon for a drama course. She later studied at London University's Royal Central School of Speech and Drama. She started her career in Britain with broadcasters such as Virgin Radio UK, BBC and ITN. She reported and presented from a range of international locations including Iraq, Afghanistan, Sierra Leone, Lebanon, Mozambique and the Balkans. From 2003, Ferguson was an embedded journalist with the British Forces Broadcasting Service in Kuwait during the Iraq War; in total, she spent six years reporting from war zones. She also reported on the 2005 earthquake in Pakistan and the Boxing Day Tsunami.

== Career in New Zealand ==
In 2009, Ferguson moved to New Zealand following a visit to meet her New Zealand relatives; her grandfather had emigrated to New Zealand in the 1930s, married a New Zealander and later returned to Scotland with his wife and two children, one of whom was Ferguson's father. Initially she presented Summer Report and Checkpoint on RNZ National. From 2014 to 2022, she presented Morning Report with Guyon Espiner.

In November 2017, Ferguson said that she was going into hospital for surgery to treat her endometriosis and would be off air for some weeks.

RNZ announced on 11 July 2022 that Ferguson was leaving her role on Morning Report to take up a new position as a senior presenter and journalist. Ferguson said she was "looking forward to switching off the early alarm, but more than that...thrilled to be given the time and opportunity to make more podcasts and programmes, as well as to connect further with listeners by presenting across a range of RNZ National's award-winning shows". From 2024 to 2026, she presented Saturday Morning on RNZ National, alongside Mihingarangi Forbes. In September 2026, after changes to Saturday Morning, Ferguson left RNZ after 16 years with the broadcaster.

In 2024, Ferguson published her memoir, Bloody Minded, in which she recounted her time as a war correspondent and living with endometriosis.
