= Higher Education (journal) =

- Discipline: Higher Education; Tertiary Education
- Language: English
- Edited by: J. Välimaa, S. Marginson

Publication details
- History: 1972-present
- Publisher: Springer Science+Business Media
- Frequency: Bimonthly
- Impact factor: 4.3 (2025)

Standard abbreviations
- ISO 4: High. Educ.

Indexing
- ISSN: 0018-1560 (print); 1573-174X (web)
- LCCN: 72624431
- OCLC no.: 709964767

Links
- Journal homepage; Online archive

Higher Education: The International Journal of Higher Education Research is a bimonthly peer-reviewed academic journal covering educational developments throughout the world in universities, polytechnics, colleges, and vocational and educational institutions. The journal reports on developments in both public and private higher education. It is published by Springer Science+Business Media. According to the Journal Citation Reports, the journal has a 2024 impact factor of 4.3.
