= Otago Pioneer Women's Memorial Hall =

Coordinates: 45°52′27″S 170°30′20″E

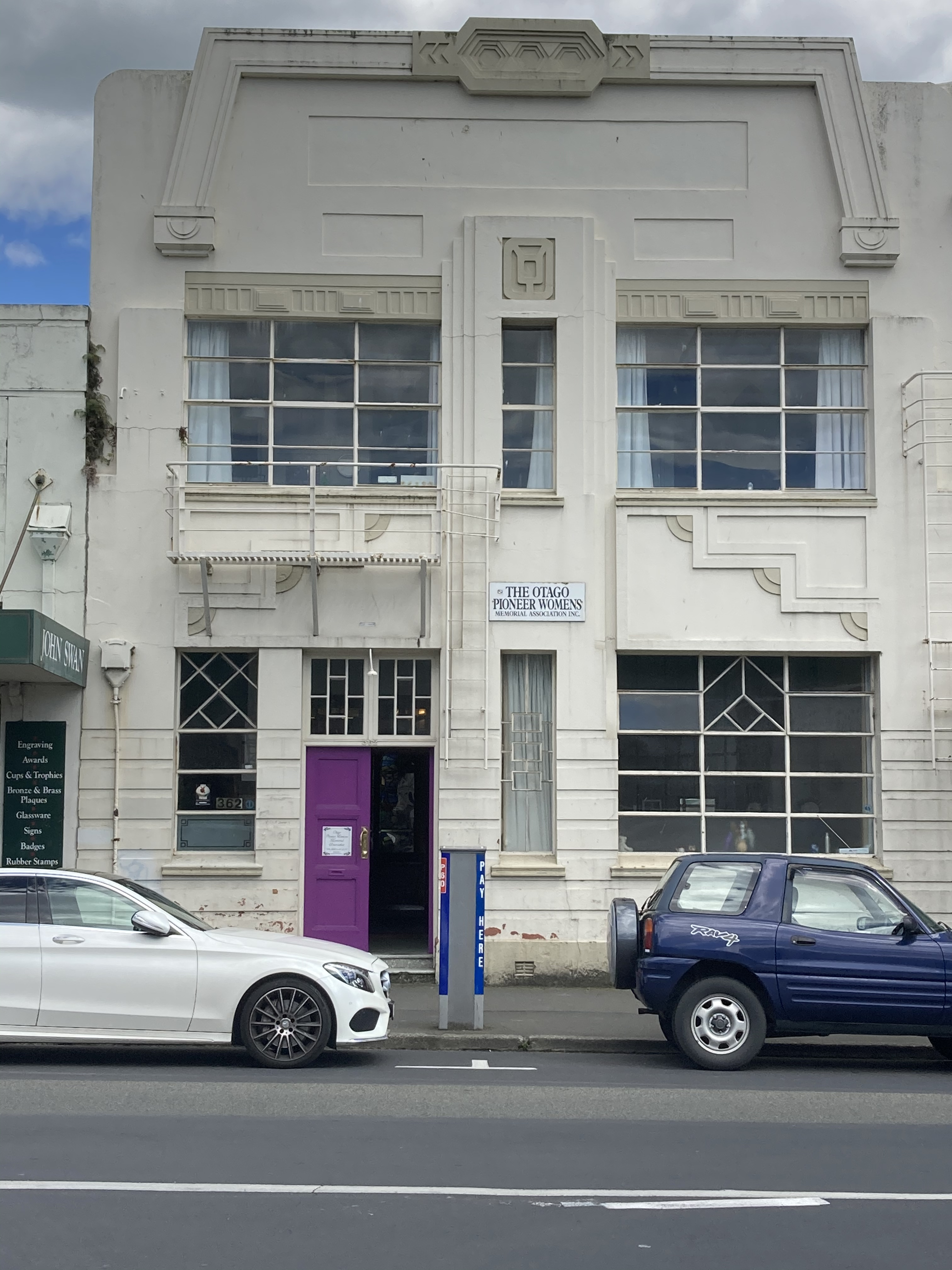
- The hall entrance in 2020. The original facade was likely boldly coloured to emphasise the Art Deco detailing.

General information
- Architectural style: Art Deco
- Location: 362 Moray Place, Dunedin, New Zealand
- Year built: 1909
- Owner: S. R. Burns and Co; Otago Pioneer Women's Memorial Association; Ōtepoti Futures Trust

Design and construction
- Architect: Cecil Gardner Dunning (1898–1962)

Heritage New Zealand – Category 1
- Official name: Otago Pioneer Women's Memorial Association Building
- Designated: 3 March 2020
- Reference no.: 9725

The Otago Pioneer Women's Memorial Hall (also known as the Otago Pioneer Women's Memorial Association Building) is a building in Dunedin, New Zealand, registered as a Category 1 historic place by Heritage New Zealand.

== History ==
The hall has been described as "one of Dunedin’s more jazzy and original expressions of the Art Deco style". The building began as a single-storey office and shop, built in 1909 for consulting engineer William James. The building was extended in 1913, and then a second storey was added in 1934–35. By this time the building was owned by Stanley Burns, who ran a tailoring business and a share-dealing company. Burns engaged South African-born architect Cecil Gardner Dunning for the extension, and had the second storey fitted out as a beauty salon. It is thought the front of the building was originally boldly coloured. The salon closed in 1937, and when Burns ran into financial difficulties, the hall was sold to the Otago Pioneer Women's Memorial Association in 1941.

== Otago Pioneer Women's Memorial Association ==
The Otago Pioneer Women's Memorial Association was formed after Emily Siedeberg-McKinnon visited the Women's Building in Vancouver, Canada, in 1928. More than 100 women's groups were using the Vancouver building, and Siedeberg-McKinnon thought Dunedin women would benefit from a similar facility. An opportunity to fund it arose in 1936 during the preparation for New Zealand's centennial celebrations. Government funding was made available for centennial projects, and a meeting chaired by Siedeberg-McKinnon and attended by representatives of 39 women's groups, voted to pursue the idea of a pioneer women's centennial memorial building. Funding for the project was initially approved by the provincial committee in 1938, but then later rescinded. The change was made after newly elected councillors decided women "had no business wanting to go to meetings and their place was in the home". Undeterred, Siedeberg-McKinnon formed, and became the inaugural president of, the Otago Pioneer Women's Memorial Association in March 1939. The building was bought and refurbished, and opened on 23 February 1942. The building was initially intended as a temporary home until a purpose-built building could be funded. To this end, in 1958, a property on York Place was purchased and fundraising was begun. However, the association remained on Moray Place.

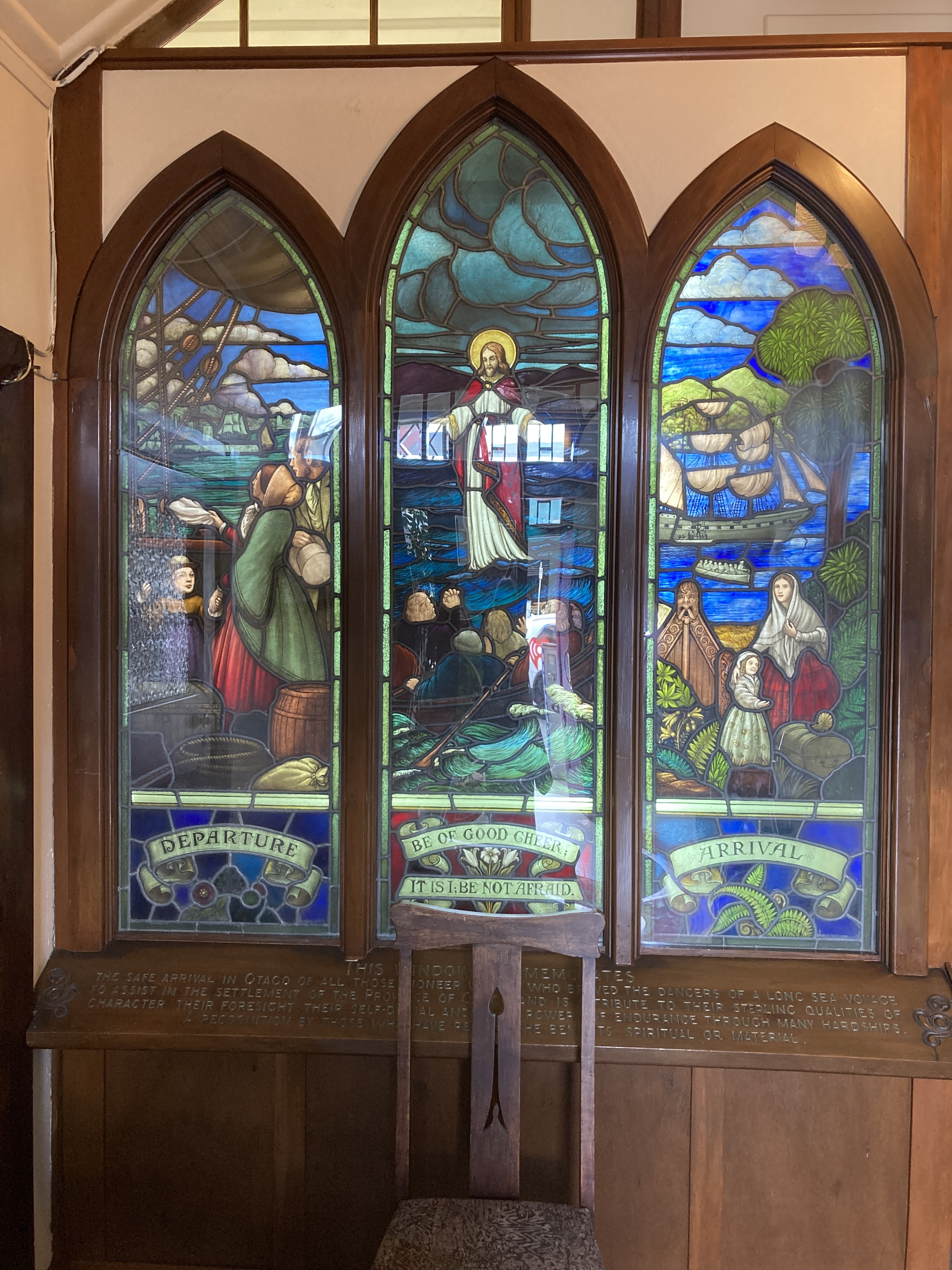
The stained glass from the Shrine of Remembrance is now in the foyer of the building. The left-hand panel shows migrants departing the Britain, and the right-hand panel shows their arrival in Dunedin, featuring the Philip Laing, native vegetation and a mother and daughter. The central panel depicts Christ walking on water, with his disciples in a rowing boat.

A small chapel, called the Shrine of Remembrance, was installed upstairs, designed by architect Frank Sturmer and with stained glass designed by Robert Fraser and made by John Brock. After the chapel was decommissioned, the stained glass was moved to the foyer. Other facilities included a hall, a boardroom, a large kitchen and a lounge.

Many organisations are recorded as having used the rooms, including the Dunedin Spiritualist Church, bridge and psychology clubs, the Dunedin Kindergarten Association, the Dunedin Burns Club, the Federation of University Women, the Musicians' Union, the Otago Women's Hockey Association, and the Registered Nurses' Association.

== Heritage listing ==
The building was listed as a Category 1 historic place by Heritage New Zealand in 2020. Heritage New Zealand assessment advisor Sarah Gallagher said: "What makes this place outstanding in New Zealand is its commemorative role of women as citizens with skills and talents to contribute to society. This was a departure from the other centennial memorials, most often Plunket or rest rooms, that were dedicated to women in their role of mother. Recognition for this significant place begins to address the lack of monuments to women in New Zealand."

In 2017, the Association celebrated its 76th anniversary and hosted a resident oral historian, Rachael Francis. Users of the building at this time included the Red Cross Choir, East Otago Federation Women's Institute, children's art classes, and a monthly creative market.

== Future use ==
In 2021, the Association called for expressions of interest in the future of the building. In 2023, the building was sold to the Ōtepoti Futures Trust for $1. The Trust intends to refurbish the building to improve access and soundproofing, undertake earthquake strengthening and make fire-protection improvements. There are also plans to extend the upper storey and reconfigure the ground floor
