= Emily Writes =

New Zealand parenting blogger and writer

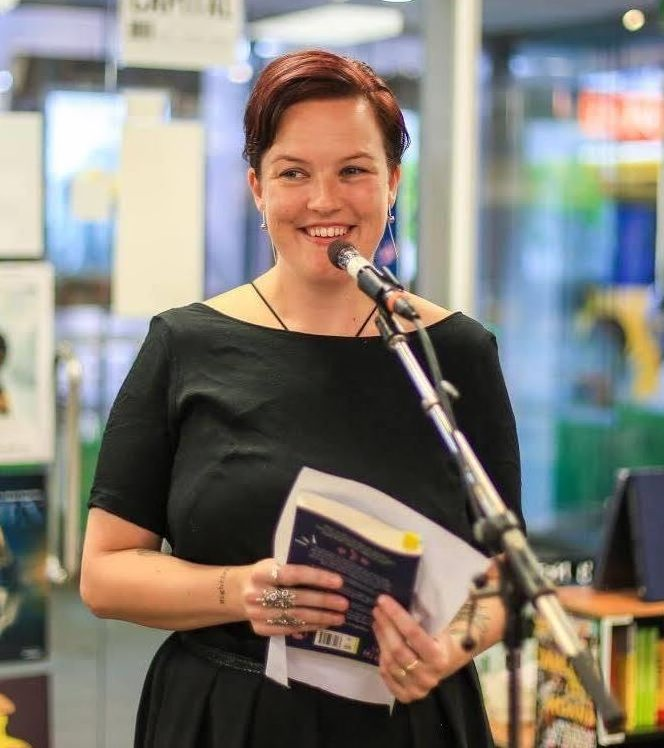
Emily Writes at the book launch for Rants in the Dark, Wellington, 2017

Emily Writes is the pen-name of a New Zealand parenting writer based in Wellington. She has published three books on parenting, one of which has been adapted as a play.

== Biography ==
Writes published her first piece of writing on her blog in March 2015; she wrote about the difficulties of settling her newborn baby to sleep at 3 a.m. The post was immediately successful and she began to write more pieces about the struggles of parenting. In 2017 she published her first book, Rants in the Dark, which was adapted as a play and has toured New Zealand. The following year, she published her second book, Is It Bedtime Yet?

In 2022, Writes published her third book Needs Adult Supervision.

In February 2016 Writes and Holly Walker started a parenting podcast called Dear Mamas.

Writes has written parenting columns for Metro magazine, The New Zealand Herald and the New Zealand Woman’s Weekly, and she was editor of The Spinoff Parents.

Writes has run a successful newsletter Emily Writes Weekly since 2020.
