= Rachel Spronken-Smith =

New Zealand professor of higher education and geography

Academic background
- Education: University of Otago, University of British Columbia, University of Otago
- Thesis: Energetics and cooling in urban parks (1994)

Rachel A. Spronken-Smith (born 1965) is a New Zealand professor of higher education and geographer at the University of Otago. She has won a number of awards for her teaching, and consults on curriculum design in higher education.

== Academic career ==
Spronken-Smith completed a PhD titled Energetics and cooling in urban parks at the University of British Columbia. Spronken-Smith then joined the faculty of the University of Canterbury, where she taught for nine years. She then transferred to the University of Otago, rising to full professor in 2013. Spronken-Smith completed a postgraduate diploma in higher education at Otago, and became more interested in higher education. She consults on curriculum design and inquiry learning in higher education, and has a special interest in doctoral education.

In 2013 the university launched a Graduate Research School, of which Spronken-Smith was dean for nearly ten years.

== Honours and awards ==
Spronken-Smith has won a number of awards for her teaching, including a University of Canterbury Teaching Award in 2002, an OUSA Supervision Award in 2012, and a University of Otago Teaching Excellence Award in 2013. In 2015 she was awarded one of ten New Zealand National Awards for Sustained Excellence in Tertiary Teaching (also known as Ako Aotearoa Tertiary Teaching Excellence Awards). In 2016 she won the TERNZ-HERDSA medal for Sustained Contribution to the Research Environment in New Zealand.

Spronken-Smith has received a Fulbright scholar award in 2017 to compare doctoral education in New Zealand and the US, by visiting the University of California, Berkeley.

== Selected works ==
- R. A. Spronken-Smith; T. R. Oke (1998). "The thermal regime of urban parks in two cities with different summer climates". International Journal of Remote Sensing. 19 (11): 2085–2104. doi:10.1080/014311698214884. Wikidata Q124304031.
- Rachel Spronken‐Smith; Rebecca Walker (2010). "Can inquiry‐based learning strengthen the links between teaching and disciplinary research?". Studies in Higher Education. 35 (6): 723–740. doi:10.1080/03075070903315502. Wikidata Q124304010.
- Oke, Timothy Richard; R.A. Spronken-Smith; E. Jáuregui; Grimmond, Sue (1999). "The energy balance of central Mexico City during the dry season". Atmospheric Environment. 33 (24–25): 3919–3930. Bibcode:1999AtmEn..33.3919O. doi:10.1016/s1352-2310(99)00134-x. Wikidata Q58319194.
- Rachel A. Spronken‐Smith; Timothy R. Oke; William P. Lowry (2000). "Advection and the surface energy balance across an irrigated urban park". International Journal of Climatology. 20 (9): 1033–1047. doi:10.1002/1097-0088(200007)20:9<1033::aid-joc508>3.3.co;2-l. Wikidata Q124304026.
- R. A. Spronken-Smith; T. R. Oke (1999). "Scale Modelling of Nocturnal Cooling in Urban Parks". Boundary-Layer Meteorology. 93 (2): 287–312. doi:10.1023/a:1002001408973. Wikidata Q124304030.
- RACHEL SPRONKEN-SMITH (2005). "Implementing a Problem-Based Learning Approach for Teaching Research Methods in Geography". Journal of Geography in Higher Education. 29 (2): 203–221. doi:10.1080/03098260500130403. Wikidata Q124304017.
- Rachel Spronken-Smith; JO Bullard; Waverly Ray; Carolyn Roberts; Artimus Keiffer (2008). "Where Might Sand Dunes be on Mars? Engaging Students through Inquiry-based Learning in Geography". Journal of Geography in Higher Education. 32 (1): 71–86. doi:10.1080/03098260701731520. Wikidata Q124304016.
