= Mark Henaghan =

New Zealand legal scholar

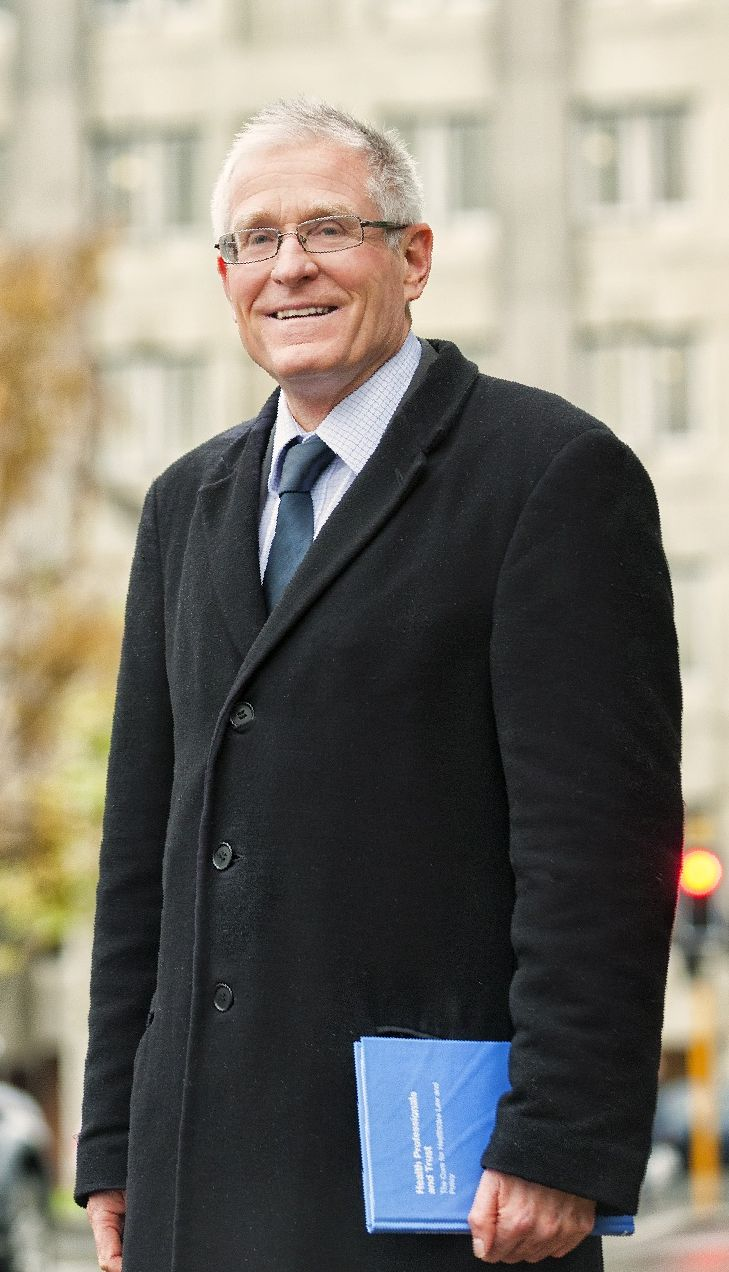
Henaghan in 2012

Raymond Mark Henaghan FRSNZ is a New Zealand law professor at the University of Auckland. Until April 2018 he was the Dean of the University of Otago Faculty of Law in Dunedin. His research interests include family law, especially law relating to children, law regarding the human genome, and judiciary law.

== Background ==
Henaghan attended school in Timaru and studied law at Otago University. On qualifying he became a teaching fellow, providing advice, helping with submissions, and training Family Court judges. He has never practised in a law firm. He is involved in the Pathways and Transitions Research Project as part of the New Zealand Government funded Resilience Research Project.

Henaghan is the second academic to be admitted as an Associate Fellow of the International Academy of Matrimonial Lawyers (IAML). The academy is a worldwide association of practising lawyers who were recognised by their peers as being among the most experienced and skilled family law specialists in their respective countries.

He is currently a Professor at the University of Auckland.

His interests have included surfing, cricket, rugby, biking, and skipping. He enjoys attending afternoon movie sessions and once had a cameo role in the New Zealand film Scarfies, as himself.

== Publications and papers ==
- Health professionals and trust: The cure for healthcare law and policy. New York: Routledge-Cavendish, 2011.
- Relocation cases: The rhetoric and the reality of a child's best interests: A view from the bottom of the world. Child & Family Law Quarterly, 23(2), pages 226–250 (2011)
- What does a child's right to be heard in legal proceedings really mean? ABA custody standards do not go far enough. Family Law Quarterly, 42(1), pages 117–129 (2008)
- Relationship property appeals in the New Zealand Court of Appeal 1958–2008: The elusiveness of equality. In R. Bigwood (Ed.), The permanent New Zealand Court of Appeal: Essays on the first 50 years (pages 99–151). Oxford: Henaghan, M., & Peart, N. (2009). Butterworths family law in New Zealand (15th ed.). Wellington, New Zealand: LexisNexis, (2011) Henaghan, M., Atkin, B., Clarkson, D., & Caldwell, J.
- Genes, society and the future (Vol. 2). Dunedin, New Zealand: Human Genome Research Project, University of Otago, Lawson, D., Henaghan, M., & McLean, S. (2007)
- Why judges need to know and understand childhood studies. In M. Freeman (Ed.), Law and childhood studies: Current legal issues 2011 (Vol. 14) (pages 39–54), Oxford University Press, (2012)
- Discretion, status and money: The essence of family law in New Zealand. In B. Atkin (Ed.), The international survey of family law: 2011 edition (pages 281–301). Bristol, UK: Family Law.
- New Zealand: How New Zealand family law deals with power imbalances. In B. Atkin (Ed.), International survey of family law: 2010 edition (pages 237–254). Bristol, UK: Family Law.
- The human genome. In I. Freckelton & H. Selby (Eds.), Appealing to the future: Michael Kirby and his legacy (pages 473–486). Sydney, Australia: Thomson Reuters (2011)
- Achieving economic equality at the end of marriage and other relationships: Not all is fair in love and war. In B. Verschraegen (Ed.), International family law (pages 695–708). Vienna, Austria: Jan Sramek Verlag. (2009)
- Bioethics and law in action: Mining the gaps: The Human Genome Research Project. In M. Freeman (Ed.), Law and bioethics: Current legal issues (Vol. II) (pages 225–237). Oxford University Press (2008).
- Preimplantation genetic diagnosis: Testing the legal boundaries. In N. Page (Ed.), Genes, society and the future (Vol. 1) (pp. 27–146). Dunedin, New Zealand: Human Genome Research Project, University of Otago. Snelling, J., Peart, N., & Henaghan, M. (2007)
- Part one: Main findings:. In N. Page (Ed.), Genes, society and the future (Vol. 1) (pp. 1–24). Dunedin, New Zealand: Human Genome Research Project, University of Otago. Henaghan, M. (2007).
- Legally rearranging families: Parents and children after break up. In M. Henaghan and B. Atkin (Ed.), Family law policy in New Zealand (3rd ed.) (pp. 269–360). Wellington, New Zealand: LexisNexis. Henaghan, M. (2007).
- Legally defining the family. In M. Henaghan and B. Atkin (Ed.), Family law policy in New Zealand (3rd ed.) (pp. 1–46). Wellington, New Zealand: LexisNexis. Henaghan, M. (2007).
- The 'Do no harm' principle and the genetic revolution in New Zealand. In McLean, S. A. M. (Ed.), First do no harm: Law, ethics and healthcare (pp. 511–526). Aldershot, UK: Ashgate. Henaghan, M. (2006).
- Family law policy in New Zealand (3rd ed.). Wellington, New Zealand: LexisNexis, 367p. Henaghan, M., & Atkin, B. (Eds.). (2007).
- Choosing genes for future children: Regulating preimplantation genetic diagnosis. Dunedin, New Zealand: Human Genome Research Project, University of Otago, 369p. Henaghan, M. (Ed.). (2006).
- The changes to final appeals in New Zealand since the creation of the New Zealand Supreme Court. Otago Law Review, 12(3), 579–604. Henaghan, M. (2011).
- Delays in the New Zealand civil justice system? Opinion v fact. Otago Law Review, 12(3), 455–471. Righarts, S., & Henaghan, M. (2011).
- Children: Heard but not listened to? An analysis of children's views under s 6 of the Care of Children's Act 2004. New Zealand Family Law Journal, 7(2), 39–52. Robinson, A., & Henaghan, M. (2011).
- Relocation cases: The rhetoric and the reality of a child's best interests: A view from the bottom of the world. Child & Family Law Quarterly, 23(2), 226–250. Henaghan, M. (2011).
- Relocation following parental separation in New Zealand: Complexity and diversity. International Family Law, (March), 97–105. Taylor, N., Gollop, M., & Henaghan, M. (2010).
- Public perceptions of the New Zealand court system: An empirical approach to law reform. Otago Law Review, 12(2), 329–344. Righarts, S., & Henaghan, M. (2010).
- Legal responses to violence in the home in New Zealand. University of New South Wales Law Journal, 33(3), 870–894. Henaghan, M., & Ballantyne, R. (2010).
- What does a child's right to be heard in legal proceedings really mean? ABA custody standards do not go far enough. Family Law Quarterly, 42(1), 117–129. Henaghan, M. (2008).
- Digital era subverts suppression, interviewed by Timothy Brown in Otago Daily Times about Queenstown suppressed indecency case (July 2014)
- Henaghan, Mark; Reynolds, Siobhan (2020). "The use of trusts and trust litigation as a form of financial abuse in Aotearoa/New Zealand and what to do about it" (PDF). Australian Journal of Family Law. 33: 303–325. Identifier: hdl.handle.net/2292/54954.
