= Toi Ohomai Institute of Technology =

New Zealand tertiary education institute

Coordinates: 37.7334°S 176.1497°E

- Established: May 2016
- Faculty: 1,036 (2016)
- Students: 14,000
- Location: New Zealand
- Campus: Rotorua, Taupō, Tauranga, Tokoroa, Whakatāne
- Website: https://www.toiohomai.ac.nz

Toi Ohomai Institute of Technology, also known simply as Toi Ohomai, is a New Zealand tertiary education institute. Toi Ohomai is a provider of vocational education for over 14,000 students, including more than 1,400 international students studying at over 86 different delivery sites across the Bay of Plenty and South Waikato region. Offering around 200 different programmes and study options ranging from certificate level to post-graduate level in courses such as Business, Forestry, Engineering, Hospitality, Tourism, Trades and many more. Toi Ohomai provides vocational education in order to make graduates employable and "work ready" with relative skills that employers need. New Zealand's vocational education system is an important part of the New Zealand tertiary education institute as it supplies employers and industry with the skilled employees they require while also ensuring vocational learners get consistent, effective and quality training.

Toi Ohomai has five main campuses in Tauranga, Rotorua, Taupō, Tokoroa and Whakatāne. It is the largest tertiary education provider in the Bay of Plenty and South Waikato regions. Toi Ohomai was formed on 1 May 2016, when Waiariki Institute of Technology and Bay of Plenty Polytechnic officially merged to become the Waiariki Bay of Plenty Polytechnic, later being renamed Toi Ohomai Institute of Technology on 7 October 2016. This merger ensured the employment and education needs of the region were met more effectively.

Toi Ohomai is the third-largest of New Zealand's 16 Institutes of Technology and Polytechnics (ITPs) which also includes The Wellington Institute of Technology or WelTec and Whitireia.

== Mission statement and values ==
Toi Ohomai has a set of values which are defined by the institute's vision to empower people and communities, in conjunction with their purpose of partnering with iwi, industry and communities to deliver innovative learning. The Toi Ohomai values were developed and launched in May 2018 following an extensive engagement and consultation with staff. The set of four values were named Toi Ohomaitanga, and include:

- Toitūtanga — defined by Toi Ohomai's staff and students courageous and humble pursuit of excellence
- Manaakitanga — dedication to upholding and strengthening the mana of others and communities
- Whanaungatanga — building and nurturing relationships and connections that enhance Toi Ohomai's purpose and vision
- Kotahitanga — being united in the shared purposes and responsibilities of Toi Ohomai

== History ==
Toi Ohomai Institute of Technology is the result of a merger between two high-performing polytechnics: the Waiariki Institute of Technology in Rotorua, and the Bay of Plenty Polytechnic in Tauranga.

=== Waiariki Institute of Technology ===
The Waiariki Institute of Technology has roots back to 1881, when the Rotorua College and Grammar School Endowments were established by the New Zealand Government. Early conceptions of tertiary education in Rotorua came in 1910, when locals suggested a technical school should be established. Technical education in Rotorua came to fruition when the Rotorua Boys' High School (founded in 1914) established their Technical Department in 1939. This focused on carpentry, electrical wiring, engineering, arts and crafts, home cookery, and secretarial work. Rotorua Boys' High School's technical division merged with Rotorua Girls' High School's Business college in 1972 to create the Senior Technical Division, which was placed under the Rotorua High School's Board of Governors in 1976. To accommodate this division, building on Mokoia Drive in Rotorua commenced, with the newly named Waiariki Community College being opened on 1 April 1978. An 'outpost' in Tokoroa, previously established by the Senior Technical Division in 1973, became the first regional campus for Waiariki, with additional campuses being opened in Whakatāne, Taupō, Tūrangi, and Kawerau in the 1980s. During this time, further courses such as tourism, hospitality, nursing, journalism, Māori studies, and forestry were added to Waiariki's curriculum. In 1987, the college's name was changed to Waiariki Polytechnic. It was changed again to The Waiariki Institute of Technology in 1998.

=== Bay of Plenty Polytechnic ===
The Bay of Plenty Polytechnic, initially named Bay of Plenty Community College, was established on 1 September 1982 as a local community college in Tauranga. It offered a mix of courses in secretarial and office administration, carpentry, automotive engineering, agriculture, and horticulture. Over one third of student admissions focused on horticulture, which reflected Tauranga's needs at the time. The college was built on Poike Road in Tauranga, and is now known as Windermere Campus. Poike Road is land significant to the Ngāti Ranginui hapū who inhabit it. "Poike" roughly translates to "arrive late at night" in Māori, indicative of the late night meetings characteristic of the hapū. In 1988 the organisation's name was officially changed to The Bay of Plenty Polytechnic. The same year saw the completion of the Rex Williams Student Amenities Centre and an atrium, part of a major horticulture complex within the Polytechnic. New training programmes were also developed in areas such as fashion, tourism, and hospitality. Three years later in 1991, the Polytechnic's second major campus, The Bongard Centre (named after Bill Bongard, the first community college council chairperson) was established in central Tauranga. This provided a space for office systems and various programmes. During the 1990s, Māori-centred programmes were added to acknowledge the Ngāti Ranginui hapū and local Māori communities, furthering the Polytechnic's relationship with local Māori. In 1997, Windermere's horticulture complex was repurposed into a hospitality studies centre, and the Bongard Centre opened a video conference space to facilitate long distance learning. From 2000 to 2003, two new learning centres were built: Te Aongahoro — The Student Learning Centre, which featured a library, cafe, and lecture theatres; and Te Pare a Ruahine — The Aquatic Centre for Pacific Coast Applied Research. In 2008, a partnership with the University of Waikato was formed to share facilities and resources to provide better pathways and enhance the skills of the region.

=== Merger into Toi Ohomai, 2016–2019 ===
On 1 May 2016, these two institutions merged to become the Waiariki Bay of Plenty Polytechnic. This became Toi Ohomai Institute of Technology on 7 October 2016. The name was gifted to the organisation by local iwi within the region, and means "to achieve great heights; to be awakened by learning". The name aims to inspire students to pursue excellence in their studies and focus their mindset on learning, while also acknowledging the mana whenua and significance of the land where Toi Ohomai conducts their education. Toi Ohomai was created in order to serve the region's education and employment needs more efficiently, ensuring better education and employment outcomes for young Māori by providing greater access for dispersed communities throughout the region.

=== Te Pūkenga, 2019–2025 ===
On 1 August 2019, then–Minister of Education Chris Hipkins announced a proposal to reform vocational education in New Zealand. Which aimed to create a unified vocational education system that responded to the needs of employees and students. This led to the creation of Te Pūkenga (New Zealand Institute of Skills and Technology) on 1 April 2020 which joined all 16 of the ITPs into a single, national, unified network of regionally accessible vocational education and training. This included Toi Ohomai, which became a subsidiary of Te Pūkenga on 1 April 2020.

On 31 May 2022, Toi Ohomai, along with Waikato Institute of Technology, announced they would directly become a part of the national vocational education provider in Te Pūkenga, instead of simply being a subsidiary institute.

On 7 December 2023, the newly-elected Sixth National Government, as a part of their 100-day plan, announced the disestablishment of Te Pukenga effective on 31 December 2026, moving away from a centralised model to establish a system of stand-alone polytechnics. The disestablishment of Te Pukenga has direct implications to Toi Ohomai, with the institute already facing a reduction of 21 full-time equivalent roles and 16 programmes ranging from youth work, health, forestry and hairdressing being discontinued as of 2025.

In mid-July 2025, the Vocational Education Minister Penny Simmonds announced that the Government would return Toi Ohomai and nine other polytechnics to regional governance by 1 January 2026.

=== Independence, 2026–present ===
On 1 January 2026, Toi Ohomai formally left Te Pukenga to become an independent entity again. In mid-February 2026, the Government allocated NZ$20 million to Toi Ohomai to support its transition.

== Courses ==
Toi Ohomai Institute of Technology offers an array of courses across various disciplines, including business, horticulture, construction, fashion, music, healthcare and teaching alongside a number of short, free and online courses. Their programs are designed to give students practical skills and knowledge that align with industry demands.

=== Subjects ===
The full list of subjects offered are as follow:

- Accounting
- Agriculture
- Animal care and veterinary nursing
- Architecture
- Automotive
- Beauty therapy
- Bridging and foundation skills
- Business
- Carpentry and construction
- Computing and IT
- Creative
- Culinary, baking and hospitality
- Educational Pathways
- Electrotechnology and Electrical
- Engineering and Welding
- English language
- Environmental management
- Fashion
- Forestry
- Graphic design
- Hairdressing and barbering
- Health and safety
- Health care
- Horticulture
- Kaupapa Maori
- Legal studies
- Maritime studies
- Maritime
- Massage therapy
- Music and performance
- Nursing
- Organics
- Police and defense force
- Real estate
- Social services
- Sport and recreation
- Surveying
- Te Reo Maori
- Teaching
- Tourism and travel

=== Undergraduate programs ===
Below are some of the available bachelor's degrees:

- Bachelor of Creative Industries (BCI) is one of the Bay of Plenty's most highly regarded creative degrees. Students can major in Visual Arts, Graphic Design or Fashion Design. The course emphasizes Sustainable, ethical and professional practice and guidance from experienced professionals.
- Bachelor of Applied Information Technology, a three-year degree focusing on areas like programming, web development and cyber security.
- Bachelor of Nursing, which combines theoretical knowledge with clinical practice, aims to create competent and compassionate nursing professionals.
- Bachelor of Applied Hospitality and Tourism Management. This degree offers practical experience and demonstrates how to create an incredible visitor experience. Students will perfect operational, managerial and business skills and learn to create their own services or products.

=== Post graduate programs ===
Below are some of the available master's degrees:

- Master of Management: Teaches advanced knowledge in strategic management, leadership and research, particularly in areas of business health and hospitality.
- Master of Applied Professional Studies (Adult Teaching): Focuses on adult learning theories and applied research, catering to professionals aiming to enhance their teaching capabilities. Assessments directly support employment.
- Master of Applied Science (Biodiversity Management): emphasizes environmental stewardship and research, delivered in partnership with Unitec, to address biodiversity challenges.

== Staff ==
Toi Ohomai Institute of Technology employs a team of educators across its faculties who emphasize practical and industry-aligned teaching. The institute has small class sizes that personalize learning.

The faculty comprises professionals with both academic qualifications and industry experience. For example, music educator Nick Ririrui brings over 20 years of experience with him when he teaches musical production and performance. Francisco De Abreu Roldao brings extensive qualifications and experience in the IT industry to his role in the faculty of business, design and service industries. In the faculty of health education and environment, Erin Kennedy, a senior academic staff member teaches courses on geology, terrestrial ecology and waste management using her experience in biology education.

Toi Ohomai emphasizes research-informed teaching. Staff like Dave Bishop take on roles as both educators and Research coordinators. The research office provides guidance and support to both staff and students and produces regular research publications.

The institute participated in the 2018 Performance-Based Research Fund Quality Evaluation which resulted in recognition across 28 different Quality categories, reflecting the quality of its teaching staff's research contributions.

== Facilities ==
Toi Ohomai has six campuses spread across the Bay of Plenty Region:

=== Taupō ===
Toi Ohomai's Taupō campus consists of two separate sections: The main campus, which includes a common room and study areas, and the Taupō automotive workshop, an off-site service and repairs shop at which students enrolled in automotive courses receive hands-on training from industry tutors. Along with carpentry, automotive engineering certificates are the most common courses offered at the Rotorua campus.

=== Tokoroa ===
Similarly to Taupō, Tokoroa campus is small, made up of a common room and study areas. It also most commonly offers carpentry and automotive courses, alongside healthcare and Kaupapa Māori.

=== Whakatāne ===
Whakatāne also has a smaller campus, geared towards forestry, fishing, and tourism courses. It includes an automotive workshop, a nail salon, and a common area.

=== Tauranga ===
Windermere campus in Tauranga is the most modern of Toi Ohomai's campuses. Situated on 24 hectares of gardens, it features laboratories, recording studios, a beauty salon, and a radio station, along with several cafes and a restaurant. Windermere offers a wide variety of courses, from veterinary nursing to accounting to fashion.

=== Rotorua ===
Toi Ohomai has two campuses in Rotorua. Mokoia, like Windermere, is a more modern campus, with lecture theatres and many specialised buildings, such as pottery studios and hair salons. The second campus, Waipā, is a one-of-a-kind wood manufacturing plant that acts as a training facility for students.

== Student life ==
Across its campuses, Toi Ohomai offers many leisure activities and events for students. This includes a wide variety of celebrations such as Māori language week, Diwali, and Halloween, along with market days, live music, and barbeques. Some campuses house amenities, including gyms and cafes. Vocational training centres, such as nail and beauty salons, are also available for students as clients. There also has a number of childcare options for parents who are studying. As is traditional with New Zealand tertiary education institutions, Toi Ohomai hosts an Orientation Week with themed events for new students to connect with one another and become acquainted with their campus.

== Research excellence ==
In 2018, Toi Ohomai participated in the Performance-Based Research Fund (PBRF) Quality Evaluation, where it achieved 28 quality categories over a wide range of academic disciplines, including business, science, creative arts, social sciences, and health education.

=== Sustainable transportation ===
Toi Ohomai is a leading tertiary institution with regards to innovation in sustainable transportation. In 2018, the institution was granted NZ$48,972 by the New Zealand Government to assist in creating a connection between its Tauranga and Rotorua campuses with two seven-seater electric vans for the use of staff in both cities. As part of Toi Ohomai's sustainability initiative, it has included research on cost-ownership models and strategies of maintenance for electric vehicles, contributing significantly on a national level to the advances in sustainable methods of transportation research and developments.

=== Māori and Indigenous research ===
Toi Ohomai boasts a strong commitment to the research of Māori values and ideas, the institution has an appointed Māori Research Advisor, Waitiahoaho Emery. Emery's role is to provide clear guidance on cultural projects and research through kaupapa, and ensure projects align with Māori cultural ideas and support Māori communities through the institution's work. Initiatives such as Te Manawa Reka Curiosity Symposium prove the institution's commitment to further incorporating kaupapa and other indigenous-inspired research and ideas.

=== Science and technology ===
Toi Ohomai focuses a large amount of its research abilities to technology and science fields, with a great shift towards digital transformation. When the institution implemented their ebs:ontrack portal, which is their online enrolment process, the average time of application processing was reduced from 65 days to one week. This implementation has helped Toi Ohomai increase its number of student enrolments, with an increase in 5%, which surpassed their initial goal of an enrolment increase of 2%.

== Involvement with Te Pūkenga (May 2022 – December 2023) ==
=== Induction ===
On 8 April 2022, it was announced that Toi Ohomai, along with 15 other learning institutions, would be assimilated into one singular overarching organisation called Te Pūkenga. This change stemmed from a 2018 government report commissioned by Chris Hipkins, Minister of Education for the Labour Government at the time. The report included a review of "a programme of change for the institute of technology and polytechnic (ITP) subsector and for vocational education more generally." The report found that changes were required to ensure that vocational studies—which make up the vast majority of Toi Ohomai's offered courses—had equitable access and provided relevant, meaningful skills for students.

It was decided that Toi Ohomai combining with other ITP's would be the most effective way of addressing the issues outlined in the report. The Labour Government at the time believed that the siloisation of the education system was leading to a lack of collaboration between sectors. By integrating with other ITP's, Toi Ohomai would be more closely aligned with institutions similar to itself. In theory, this would bring many positives, including more consistent vocational standards, more cross-institutional cooperation for research, and improved partnerships with Iwi and Māori communities.

On 31 May 2022, a month after the initial announcement, Toi Ohomai officially joined Te Pūkenga, becoming the first ITP to do so, alongside the Waikato Institute of Technology. Cathy Cooney, Toi Ohomai Board Chair, welcomed this move, saying: "Bringing Toi Ohomai and Wintec into Te Pūkenga whānau early will enable a low-risk phased approach, giving assurance and confidence as we move the rest of the sector by 1 January 2023." This was a significant event for Toi Ohomai. When talking about the transition of ITPs to Te Pūkenga, Christopher Hipkins admitted that "change on this scale will be disruptive." Te Pūkenga was a long-term plan, looking to fundamentally reform the way vocational study was offered in New Zealand.

=== Return to a regional model ===
In December of 2023, the newly elected National-led coalition government announced plans to disestablish Te Pūkenga within its first 100 days in power. Tertiary Education Minister Penny Simmonds expressed the government's intent to restore autonomy to regional polytechnics, giving them the freedom to operate independently or as part of a federation. The disestablishment is set to be completed by the end of 2026.

As a result of this policy change, the Toi Ohomai Institute of Technology has begun its transition back to a regional governance model. The institute has already seen a reduction of 21 full-time positions and the discontinuation of 16 programs across their campuses in areas. Specifically: apiculture, makeup and skincare, forestry, forest management, timber machining, hairdressing, health and rehabilitation studies, health and well-being, sterilizing technology, pest operations, social work, youth work, whanau ora, secondary tertiary exploration programs, primary industry skills and supply chain management. The loss of these programs would have a large impact on Industry and current and future New Zealand learners. Financial challenges since the disestablishment announcement mean that the institute will close its Waipā campus in Rotorua by the end of 2025. Senior academic staff member, Kerry Parker emphasized the uniqueness of the campus, saying that its closure would eliminate the only facility of its kind in the Southern Hemisphere and end timber machining and saw doctoring block courses in New Zealand. The Education Union has received 18 letters of support from forestry industry leaders advocating for the course offerings at Waipā to remain in place. Concerns have also been raised around rumors of a potential closure of the Taupō campus.

In response to the disestablishment, Te Pūkenga's 2025 Statement of Performance Expectations outlines a move towards empowering regional decision-making and rebuilding local capacity and capability. This includes reestablishing local communities of practice and advisory boards to ensure there is adequate responsiveness to regional needs. Academic management and delivery teams are also in the process of being rebuilt to monitor both quality and compliance at the local level.

== Disestablishment of Te Pūkenga ==
The disestablishment of Te Pūkenga was the result of a multitude of issues, including supposed financial instability, changes in governance, and a policy shift by a new government favouring regional autonomy in tertiary education.

=== Financial challenges ===
Consolidation had led to significant financial difficulties, Newshub had uncovered that by December 2022, none of the 16 polytechnics under Te Pūkenga were financially viable independently, with a combined deficit of NZ$185 million. Whitireia New Zealand and WelTec both reported a deficit of NZ$28 million each, with many other polytechnics experiencing similar problems. Much of this financial strain was led by internal staffing issues, high turnover rates and the resignation of Chief Executive Peter Winder in December 2023 only helped increase in the turmoil of Te Pūkenga.

=== Policy shift and government decisions ===
In December 2023, the National-led coalition government announced their plans to begin the process of disestablishing Te Pūkenga and to revert to an independent model of polytechnics. Tertiary Education Minister Penny Simmonds said that the centralisation of the polytechnics had not increased efficiency but had instead increased bureaucracy in the system. As an alternative, the government had revealed a plan to develop eight to ten regional institutions, with more autonomy to better cater to local and regional needs.

=== Process of disestablishment ===
The disestablishment began swiftly, with the government ordering Te Pūkenga to cease operations which were not complicit with the dissolution. A financial officer was appointed to oversee and manage the dissolution and transition, and the government vowed to quickly introduce legislation which would begin to formalise the process of dissolution. Remodeling of Te Pūkenga was planned to be finalised in January 2025, with plans for the future of polytechnics to be published by early 2024.

=== Relevancy to Toi Ohomai ===
The disestablishment of Te Pūkenga directly affects Toi Ohomai, which will have to return to being an autonomous institution, this process is set to be completed by 31 December 2026. Toi Ohomai under Te Pūkenga has been a significant period in the history of the institution, where the Toi Ohomai functioned as a centralised educational institution. The near future of Toi Ohomai will consist of decentralised operations as it begins to function again with more autonomy and independence.

=== Future of Toi Ohomai ===
With the announced disestablishment of Te Pukenga, the structure of vocational education will move away from a centralised approach, going towards a decentralised autonomous future. This has direct implications into the future of Toi Ohomai Institute of Technology.

Toi Ohomai will become an autonomous "stand alone" institution, no longer being a subsidiary of Te Pūkenga, along with the 15 other ITPs. However, there is also a possibility that Toi Ohomai will not remain a stand alone institution, instead merging with another ITP to create a brand-new organisation. Similar to the merger in 2016 which established Toi Ohomai. Reasons for a new merge mainly include financial viability, something that stand alone polytechnics especially in smaller communities such as Toi Ohomai struggle with. Sharing, collaborating and co-operating on resources increases financial viability.

Financial viability will be a major concern in Toi Ohomai's near future, resulting in courses, staff, campuses, and student services being cut due to decreased funding for standalone institutions under a regional model. Nearly all of the current ITPs, including Toi Ohomai, have already begun cutting courses, staff, and student services, which will only exacerbate when Te Pūkenga officially dissolves. Reduced funding and subsequent cuts within education organisations, correlates to a negative effect on the quality of education provided and student achievement.

In a decentralised education model, regional inequities between well and poorly endowed regions are increasingly more difficult to address compared to centralised models such as Te Pūkenga. Toi Ohomai, located in a considerably lesser endowed region then Wellington or Auckland City, will face further financial inequities effecting their students. In 2019 42.9% of Toi Ohomai's students were Māori. As of 2023, 32.9% of the population in the Bay of Plenty were Māori, the third-highest concentration in New Zealand. Māori will most likely be disproportionately affected by financial struggles and regional inequities facing Toi Ohomai after the disestablishment of Te Pūkenga.
