= Rona Woodgyer =

New Zealand netball player

Personal information
- Full name: Rona Olive Woodgyer (Née: Leask)
- Born: 19 December 1922 Palmerston North, New Zealand
- Died: 27 June 2009 (aged 86) Palmerston North, New Zealand
- Occupation: Cashier
- Height: 1.83 m (6 ft 0 in)
- Spouse: Reginald Cecil Woodgyer (died 2004)
- School: Palmerston North Technical School

Netball career
- Playing position: GK
Years	National team	Caps
1948	New Zealand	2

Rona Olive Woodgyer (née Leask; 19 December 1922 – 27 June 2009) was a New Zealand netball player. She played as goal keeper in the New Zealand team in two of the three Test matches against the touring Australian team in 1948.

== Early life ==
Woodgyer was born Rona Olive Leask in Palmerston North on 19 December 1922, and was educated at Palmerston North Technical School where she played in the school netball team. In 1946 or 1947, she married Reginald Cecil Woodgyer.

== Netball career ==
Leask played provincial representative netball for Manawatu from 1936.

In 1948, Woodgyer played for New Zealand national team in the second and third Tests against the touring Australian team. In the second Test at New Plymouth, the Australians were victorious, winning 44–13, although Woodgyer was reported to have been "outstanding in defence", and it was said that against strong opposition she "played a keen game". The third Test was also won by Australia, 44–22. Woodgyer did not play for the national team again, as they did not play another international game until 1960. However, she continued a successful basketball career as a player.

== Later life ==
Woodgyer worked as a cashier. She died in Palmerston North on 27 June 2009, and her ashes were buried in Kelvin Grove Cemetery with those of her husband who had predeceased her in 2004.
