= NMIT =

NMIT may refer to:

- Nelson Marlborough Institute of Technology, in New Zealand
- Northern Melbourne Institute of TAFE, now Melbourne Polytechnic, in Australia
