= Taima Moeke-Pickering =

New Zealand decolonisation academic

- Education: University of Waikato
- Scientific career
- Fields: Decolonisation
- Workplaces: Waikato Institute of Technology, Whare Wananga o Awanauirangi, Laurentian University
- Thesis: Decolonisation as a social change framework and its impact on the development of Indigenous-based curricula for Helping Professionals in mainstream Tertiary Education Organisations (2010)

Taima Moeke-Pickering is a Canadian-New Zealand academic, a Māori, of Ngāti Pūkeko and Tuhoe descent and as of 2019 is a full professor at the Laurentian University.

== Academic career ==
After years of working as a professor and administrator at the University of Waikato and years at Waikato Institute of Technology, Moeke-Pickering moved to Canada in 2006 to take up a position as an assistant professor in the School of Indigenous Relations at Laurentian University. She completed her PhD in 2010 titled 'Decolonisation as a social change framework and its impact on the development of Indigenous-based curricula for Helping Professionals in mainstream Tertiary Education Organisations'. At Laurentian University, Moeke-Pickering rose to full professor in 2019.

== Selected works ==
- Moeke-Pickering, Taima Materangatira. "Maori identity within whanau: A review of literature." (1996).
- Moeke-Pickering, Taima, Mate Heitia, Sonny Heitia, Rolinda Karapu, and Sheila Cote-Meek. "Understanding Maori food security and food sovereignty issues in Whakatane." Mai Journal 4, no. 1 (2015): 29–42.
- Moeke-Pickering, Taima M., Mahalia K. Paewai, Amelia Turangi-Joseph, and Averil ML Herbert. "Clinical psychology in Aotearoa/New Zealand: indigenous perspectives." (2017).
- Moeke-Pickering, Taima, Sheila Hardy, Susan Manitowabi, A. Mawhiney, Emily Faries, Kelly Gibson-van Marrewijk, Nancy Tobias, and Mikaere Taitoko. "Keeping our fire alive: Towards decolonising research in the academic setting." WINHEC (World Indigenous Higher Education Consortium) Journal (2006).
- Moeke-Pickering, T., Cote-Meek, S., & Pegoraro. "Critical Reflections and Politics on Advancing Women in the Academy" (2020) @IGI Global Books
- Cote-Meek, S. & Moeke-Pickering, T. "Decolonizing and Indigenizing Education in Canada" (2020) Canadian Scholar Books
- Moeke-Pickering, T. "Taking me home: The life of Mere Hiki" in Red Dresses on Bare Trees: Stories and Reflection on Missing and Murdered Indigenous Women and Girls (2021) J. Charlton Publishing
- Moeke-Pickering, T. "Honouring Papatuanuku: Honouring Mother Earth" in The Clean Place: Honouring Indigenous Spiritual Roots of Turtle Island (2019) J" Charlton Publishing
- Moeke-Pickering, T., Rowat, J., Cote-Meek, S. & Pegoraro, A. "Indigenous Social Activism Using Twitter: Amplifying Voices Using #MMIWG in Indigenous Peoples Rise Up: The Global Ascendency of Social Media Activism (2021) Rutgers University Press.
- Moeke-Pickering, T., Cote-Meek, S. & Pegoraro, A. "Understanding the ways missing and murdered Indigenous women are framed and handled by social media users (2018). IN @Sage Journals Media International Australia.
- Cote-Meek, S. & Moeke-Pickering, T. "Perspectives on Indigenous pedagogy in education: Learning from one another" (2023) @IGI Global Books
- Cote-Meek, S. & Moeke-Pickering, T. "Amplifying and centering Indigenous pedagogies in Post-Secondary education". In. Perspectives on Indigenous pedagogy in education: Learning from one another (2023) @IGI Global Books
