= The Open Polytechnic of New Zealand =

Educational institution in New Zealand

Coordinates: 41.21851°S 174.93127°E

The Open Polytechnic of New Zealand or Open Polytechnic (Māori: Kuratini Tuwhera) is a government-owned tertiary education institution operating as the specialist national provider of open and distance learning (ODL). Located in Waterloo , Lower Hutt near New Zealand's capital city Wellington, Open Polytechnic provides tertiary education at a national level for 30,000 students each year.

== History ==
The Open Polytechnic began life in Wellington as the Technical Correspondence School in 1946, providing resettlement training for returned servicemen and women following World War II. In 1963 it became the Technical Correspondence Institute offering mainly theory training in trades subjects.

The institution underwent a major transformation in 1990 when it was renamed The Open Polytechnic of New Zealand, going on to become a multi-faceted provider of ODL courses and services.

On 1 April 2020, The Open Polytechnic became a subsidiary of Te Pūkenga (the New Zealand Institute of Skills and Technology) alongside the 15 other institutes of technology and polytechnics (ITPs).

In July 2025, the Vocational Education Minister Penny Simmonds announced that The Open Polytechnic would leave Te Pūkenga and join a new federation of polytechnics consisting of Otago Polytechnic and the Universal College of Learning.

On 1 January 2026, the Open Polytechnic formally left Te Pukenga and became an independent entity again. In mid-February 2026, the Government allocated over NZ$27 million to the Open Polytechnic to support its transition. In late March 2026, Simmonds confirmed that Tai Poutini Polytechnic in Greymouth would be merged into the Open Polytechnic from 1 January 2027.

== Student Advisory Group ==
The Open Polytechnic student advisory group offers insights from learners regarding products and services. It serves as a consultation panel during the development of new initiatives that impact students.

Membership in the advisory group can include up to 12 learners. These individuals engage via online platform with occasional in-person meetings with relevant senior managers from Open Polytechnic and the Open Polytechnic Council.

Members serve an initial two-year term and may be reappointed for up to three terms. Selection criteria include:

- Demonstrated interest in distance education
- Current enrolment with a minimum of 24 weeks of study completed at the time of appointment
- Qualities and skills showcased in the nomination form that indicate their potential contributions to the Open Polytechnic Student Advisory Group.
