= Nelson Marlborough Institute of Technology =

Public tertiary education institution in Nelson, New Zealand

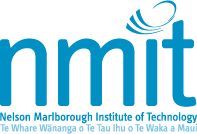
- Affiliations: Public NZ TEI
- Faculty: 243 FTE staff 2015
- Students: 3,179 EFTS (2015)
- Location: Nelson, New Zealand; 41.2746°S 173.2891°E
- Website: www.nmit.ac.nz

Nelson Marlborough Institute of Technology (NMIT) is a public tertiary education institution at the top of the South Island in New Zealand. NMIT's main campus is in Nelson with other campuses in Blenheim, Marlborough, Woodbourne and Richmond. It has been providing tertiary education in the Nelson-Marlborough region since 1904. NMIT offers 100 programmes at certificate, diploma or degree level across a broad range of areas and has a yearly enrolment of around 3,000 equivalent full-time students, locally, nationally and internationally.

== Curriculum and programmes ==
NMIT is an NZQA approved Category 1 tertiary education provider and ISO 9001 certified.

The region's economy includes New Zealand's largest concentration of fisheries, wine and aquaculture. It also has substantial forestry, horticulture, aviation, tourism and arts industries as well as a sizeable conservation estate, including three national parks. NMIT has developed programmes that sustain the region's infrastructure as well as specialised programmes in niche areas.

NMIT's programmes include Viticulture, Aquaculture, Nursing, Maritime, Adventure Tourism, Creative Industries, Business and Computing. It also delivers a wide range of trade qualifications.

== History ==
Nelson Marlborough Institute of Technology (NMIT) originated from the Nelson Technical School founded in 1905. Initially offering courses in various disciplines including cookery, engineering, and commerce. NMIT expanded its operations into Marlborough in the 1980s, establishing the Ballinger Horticulture Centre and later developing campuses in Richmond and Nelson. By 1992, NMIT began offering degree-level education, enhancing its focus on local industries such as horticulture, forestry, and viticulture. The institution's growth resulted in its renaming to Nelson Marlborough Institute of Technology in 2000, to reflect its regional influence. Today, NMIT remains a pivotal educational institution, offering a diverse range of over 100 qualifications from certificates to master's degrees, with specialties in aquaculture, maritime, viticulture, wine, and aviation engineering.

On 1 April 2020, NMIT was subsumed into New Zealand Institute of Skills & Technology alongside the 15 other Institutes of Technology and Polytechnics (ITPs).

In mid-July 2025, the Vocational Education Minister Penny Simmonds announced that the Government would return NMIT and nine other polytechnics to regional governance by 1 January 2026.

On 1 January 2026, NMIT left Te Pukenga and became an independent entity again. In mid-February 2026, the Government allocated NMIT NZ$22.6 million to assist with the transition phase.
