= Western Institute of Technology at Taranaki =

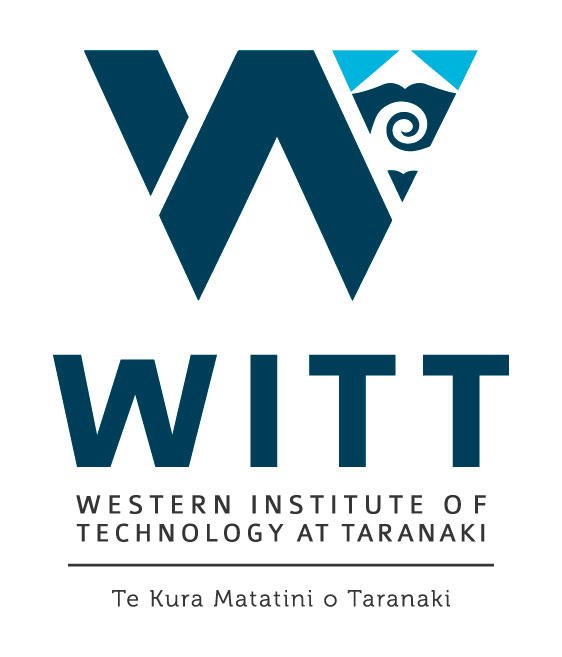
- Other names: Te Kura Matatini o Taranaki
- Established: 1972
- Affiliations: Public NZ TEI
- Students: 5,000
- Location: 20 Bell Street, New Plymouth, New Zealand
- Website: www.witt.ac.nz

Western Institute of Technology at Taranaki (WITT) is the largest tertiary education institution in Taranaki, New Zealand.

== History ==
On 1 April 2020, WITT became a subsidiary of Te Pūkenga (the New Zealand Institute of Skills & Technology) alongside the 15 other Institutes of Technology and Polytechnics (ITPs). WITT will remain a subsidiary of Te Pūkenga until early January 2023 when it is fully merged into the national entity.

In mid-July 2025, the Vocational Education Minister Penny Simmonds announced that WITT along with NorthTec, Whitireia New Zealand, the Wellington Institute of Technology (WelTEC) and Tai Poutini Polytechnic (TPP) would temporarily remain with Te Pūkenga until final decisions were made in early 2026. On 1 January 2026, it was confirmed that WITT would remain part of Te Pukenga until 1 January 2027.

== Campuses ==
The institute has two campuses around Taranaki; the main campus is situated in New Plymouth, and the other is located in Hawera. WITT is accredited by the New Zealand Qualifications Authority.

WITT also has a campus in Hamilton which is part of the New Zealand Institute Highway Technology, WITT's wholly owned subsidiary.

== Curriculum ==
WITT offers programmes from Levels 1 to 9, including degrees and diplomas, apprenticeships and short courses.
