= Te Pūkenga =

New Zealand vocational education provider

New Zealand Institute of Skills and Technology
- Established: 1 April 2020
- Affiliations: Public Tertiary Education Institution
- CEO: Gus Gilmore
- Students: Fulltime-students: 45,989 (2024); Apprentices: 60,515 (2024)
- Location: Cr Angelesa and Nisbet Streets, Hamilton, Hamilton, New Zealand, New Zealand
- Website: www.nzist.ac.nz

New Zealand Institute of Skills and Technology (formerly Te Pūkenga) is the largest vocational education provider in New Zealand. In February 2019, the Sixth Labour Government announced that the country's 16 Institutes of Technology and Polytechnics (ITPs) would merge to form the new organisation; the merger was effective on 1 April 2020. In addition to the polytechnics, Te Pūkenga also took over responsibility for industry training and apprenticeship training from nine industry training organisations (ITOs).

In early December 2023, the incoming Sixth National Government confirmed it would be dissolving Te Pūkenga and replacing the mega polytechnic with eight to ten institutions.

In July 2025, it was confirmed that Te Pūkenga would be replaced with 10 stand-alone polytechnics from 1 January 2026, and that Te Pūkenga would continue operating for another year until its disestablishment on 31 December 2026.

== Organisational description ==
NZIST has almost 13,000 staff, 240,000 students, and assets worth NZ$2 billion. The student body includes those studying at New Zealand's 16 ITPs, and nine apprentice and industry training programmes. The national polytechnic is led by Gus Gilmore.

NZIST legislative framework is the Education (Vocational Education and Training Reform) Amendment Act 2020. This bill amended the Education Act 1989 and repealed the Industry Training and Apprenticeships Act 1992 to create a unified and cohesive vocational education and training system. The bill passed its third reading on 19 February 2020 and received royal assent on 24 February 2020.

== History ==
=== Background ===
Chris Hipkins, the Minister of Education, announced in February 2018 that the education sector—from preschool to tertiary—was up for review. The details were outlined in a cabinet paper and this included "a programme of change for the institute of technology and polytechnic (ITP) subsector and for vocational education more generally". After consultation with the education sector, Hipkins released a proposal in February 2019 that went much further than the options discussed in consultation, with all 16 ITPs to merge into one organisation.

The 16 ITPs were:

- Ara Institute of Canterbury
- Eastern Institute of Technology
- Manukau Institute of Technology
- Nelson Marlborough Institute of Technology
- NorthTec
- Otago Polytechnic
- Southern Institute of Technology
- Tai Poutini Polytechnic
- The Open Polytechnic of New Zealand
- Toi Ohomai Institute of Technology
- Unitec Institute of Technology
- Universal College of Learning
- Waikato Institute of Technology
- Wellington Institute of Technology
- Western Institute of Technology at Taranaki
- Whitireia New Zealand

Hipkins admitted that "change on this scale will be disruptive". This merger was confirmed on 1 August 2019 alongside the working title "New Zealand Institute of Skills & Technology", and the following day, Hipkins announced the membership of an establishment ten-person-board based in the Christchurch suburb of Addington and starting work on 5 August 2019:

- Barry Jordan (chair) – Wellington
- Kim Ngārimu (deputy chair) – Gisborne
- Shane Culham
- Maryann Geddes
- Kathy Grant
- Dr Sandra Grey
- Tania Hodges
- Brett O'Riley
- Dr Linda Sissons
- Peter Winder

Regions were invited to submit proposals for the head office location. The Government Electronic Tendering Service (GETS) asked for registrations of interest from 6 December 2019 to 15 January 2020. The outcome was to be announced in March 2020 but when New Zealand went into lockdown due to the coronavirus pandemic, this process was put on hold.

The Minister of Education announced the first seven members of the governing council on 18 March 2020:

- Murray Strong (chair; 3-year term)
- Kim Ngārimu (deputy chair; 3-year term)
- Maryann Geddes (3-year term)
- Kathy Grant (3-year term)
- Tania Hodges (3-year term)
- Sam Huggard (4-year term)
- Peter Winder (3-year term)

Chris Collins, the chief executive of Eastern Institute of Technology, was appointed interim chief executive for NZIST. Stephen Town, former CEO of Auckland Council; was appointed chief executive for NZIST. He started his new role at the end of June 2020, with a salary of NZ$688,235.

=== Naming ===
Forty Māori language names were under consideration for the organisation, and by 2 March 2020, five of those had been shortlisted:

- Korowai Mātauranga (A journey under the guidance and protection of a cloak of expertise)
- Pūkenga Aotearoa (A skills-based Institute with Aotearoa at its heart)
- Takiura Aotearoa (Traditional learning places for knowledge of a higher level)
- Te Pū Mātauranga (A foundation or source of knowledge)
- Te Rau Mātangi (A supported journey to gain knowledge and understanding)

It was expected that the name would be decided before the start of NZIST but the Establishment Board asked for more time.

In September 2020, Chris Hipkins announced the institute's permanent name, Te Pūkenga – New Zealand Institute of Skills and Technology. The name describes the "gaining and mastery of valuable skills through passing knowledge down from person to person". The individual institutes of technology/polytechnics (ITPs) will retain their current trading names, while their legal names will change to reflect the fact that they are subsidiaries of Te Pūkenga.

=== Transition ===
==== Merger process ====
As part of the planned transition into a single mega polytechnic entity, all 16 Institutes of Technology and Polytechnics (ITPs) and most industry training organisations would be absorbed into Te Pūkenga on 1 January 2023; thus losing their individual identities and becoming one national mega polytechnic.

In late May 2022, Radio New Zealand reported that a March 2022 document indicated that independent reviewers had expressed concerns about the future of Te Pūkenga. The report highlighted tensions between the vocational education provider and the Tertiary Education Commission (TEC) over what Te Pūkenga would be providing when it takes over responsibility of the ITPs on 1 January 2023. The report also expressed concerns that the institutes of technology/polytechnics were not well prepared for the transition and lacked direction from Te Pūkenga on how to prepare for the transition. In addition, the report stated that Te Pūkenga had been slow to develop its information technology and financial back-office functions in anticipation for the transition. The report warned that the vocational provider might not be financially viable and that the consolidation process could take longer than planned and fail to meet its goals. Following the report's release, chief executive Town stated that Te Pūkenga had accepted all of the review's recommendations and was in the process of implementing them. By contrast, the opposition National Party tertiary education spokesperson Penny Simmonds urged the government to abandon its plan to merge the polytechnics into a national entity and instead invest in struggling institutions.

On 23 June 2022, Te Pūkenga released its first annual report, which covered the period between 1 January and 31 December 2021. According to Town, key achievements for the 2021 academic year included publishing world-leading academic research, producing 48,734 graduates (a 77.5% graduation rate), establishing Te Pūkenga Work Based Learning to facilitate the transition of former industry training organisations, and establishing interim staff, student and Māori committees to aid with the transition. That same day, the Tertiary Education Union described efforts to consolidate the education curricula of the various polytechnics into a new streamlined curriculum as "rushed and disrespectful." They claimed that consolidation process would do little to address the national shortage of nurses and social workers.

On 11 July, the National Party's tertiary education spokesperson Simmonds criticised the Te Pūkenga model for failing to improve struggling polytechnics while discouraging good performers. She also criticised the creation of 180 Hamilton head office jobs in the light of 600 projected redundancies resulting from the merger process. According to Simmonds, the Government had spent NZ$200 million on merging the polytechnics into Te Pūkenga. She also suggested that the NZ$110 million deficit was higher than reported. Simmonds claimed that Town's departure on "special leave" was a sign of trouble with the new entity. Similar issues about the centralisation of the polytechnics was also raised by an Otago Daily Times editorial in mid–July 2022 which expressed concerns about its impact on high-performing institutions such as Otago Polytechnic and Southern Institute of Technology. The editorial also described the creation of Te Pūkenga as part of the Labour Government's centralisation policies alongside the former district health boards and the Three Waters reform programme.

In mid-July 2022, the 16 polytechnics and four industrial training organisations commenced "combined branding" to raise awareness of their planned merger into Te Pūkenga in early January 2023. The rebrand was managed by marketing company Clemenger BBDO. Acting CEO Winder stated that the mega polytechnic would provide campus-based, online, and job-based training while reducing duplication of resources and competition between local institutions.

On 28 July, former Otago Polytechnic chief executive Phil Ker described the Education Minister Chris Hipkins's efforts to merge the polytechnics into a single entity as a "national disgrace," citing NZIST beleaguered financial situation and merger transition delays. Ker argued that the reforms failed to address the polytechnic sector's inadequate funding and stated that the merger transition process would lead to extensive staff redundancies across the entire sector. Ker suggested that Te Pūkenga could be revamped as a central agency that provided guidance and education support to the various polytechnics. Hipkins defended his Government's polytechnic merger policy, stating that the previous model had created unnecessary competition and was not delivering the skilled workers that employers and businesses needed. Hipkins stated that the new model would encourage local innovation and improve connections with local businesses to tackle skills shortages.

On 4 August, acting-chief executive Winder indicated that Te Pūkenga would be adopting a "unified fees approach" for all its campuses in the near future. While its subsidiary Southland Institute of Technology would maintain its zero fees policy for the 2023 academic year, this would be discontinued in 2024.

On 23 August, Te Pūkenga announced that three further transitional industry training organisations Careerforce, New Zealand Hair, Beauty and Barbering Industry Training Organisation (HITO), and Primary Industry Training Organisation (Primary ITO) would merge into the mega polytechnic between 1 September and 1 October 2022. These three entities would become business divisions of NZIST subsidiary Work Based Learning Limited (WBL). Other business divisions of WBL have included Competenz, Connexis, BCITO, MITO and ServiceIQ. By December 2023, Te Pūkenga consisted of 16 polytechnics and nine industry training organisations.

==== Leadership resignations ====
By mid–April 2021, Stuff reported that eight of the sixteen polytechnic chief executives had resigned since their institutions were merged into Te Pūkenga a year ago. The chief executive roles at NZIST ITP subsidiaries are expected to expire at the end of 2022 with management shifting to a central executive team headed by Chief Executive Town and six deputies. Former Otago Polytechnic CEO Phil Ker attributed the resignations to fears about impending job losses in the new vocational education provider. Former Southern Institute of Technology CEO and National Party tertiary education spokesperson Simmonds also expressed concern that the resignation of polytechnic CEOs was depriving the polytechnic sector of experienced senior managers. By contrast, TEC chief executive Tim Fowler expressed confidence in NZIST leadership while Tertiary Education Union national president Tina Smith opined that the new polytechnic system was preferable to the previous model of "competing fiefdoms."

On 20 April 2021 Merran Davis resigned from her position as NZIST deputy chief executive for transformation and transition. Davis had been appointed to the position in April 2020. Davis had previously been chief executive of the Waikato Institute of Technology until 2014. In response, the National Party's education spokesperson Simmonds suggested that Davis' resignation reflected problems with the polytechnic merger process.

On 8 July 2022, Chief Executive Stephen Town took "personal leave" for unspecified reasons with Te Pūkenga council member Peter Winder was acting chief executive in the interim. On 10 July, the Waikato Times reported that a memo by Tertiary Education Commission deputy chief executive Gillian Dudgeon to the Education Minister Hipkins identified several problems facing the national polytechnic provider including a lack of leadership, a deficit of NZ$110 million due to a 12% drop in enrolments compared with 2021 (which exceeded the organisation's budget of NZ$57.5 million), and inaction over improving NZIST financial state. The TEC memo also disclosed that chief executive Town was earning an annual salary over NZ$670,000; which exceeded Prime Minister Jacinda Ardern's annual salary of NZ$471,049. In response to media coverage, Hipkins defended the transition progress and attributed the low enrolment figures to record low unemployment and plentiful job opportunities.

On 27 July, Education Minister Hipkins ruled out calls by former Te Pūkenga senior executive Merran Davis to place a commissioner in charge of the entity at the time. However, he stated that he would reconsider appointing a commissioner to head the organisation.

On 16 August 2022, Town formally resigned his position as CEO of Te Pūkenga. His responsibilities and duties were assumed by Acting-CEO Peter Winder. In response to Town's resignation, Simmonds suggested that Town had been made a scapegoat by NZIST governing board and recommended that the Auditor-General investigate the circumstances behind Town's resignation.

On 14 September, NZIST chief financial officer Matthew Walker resigned. Walker had assumed the position in July 2022. Winder confirmed that an interim financial officer had been appointed in Walker's absence and that the organisation was working on improving its financial situation. In response, Simmonds claimed that Walker's resignation reflected systemic problems with an organisation that had trouble managing its finances. Simmonds also stated that a future National-led government would disestablish Te Pūkenga and transfer the polytechnics back to their communities.

==== Staff consultation and redundancies ====
On 3 August 2022, Chairperson Murray Strong apologised to Te Pūkenga staff members for not listening to their concerns, appreciating their expertise, and for delays in transitioning into a single institution. Strong and acting chief-executive Winder also appeared before Parliament's education select committee to answer questions about delays in the transition process, how it was dealing with its financial constraints, and working with staff members. Strong confirmed that Te Pūkenga was working to reduce its deficit to NZ$50 million and that Winder would oversee the transition process until the end of 2022. These cost-cutting measures have included reducing head office expenses by NZ$8 million.

On 15 August, Winder announced that Te Pūkenga had begun consulting its over 13,000 employees on its proposed leadership structure and business groups. The mega polytechnic proposes creating seven networks based around seven vocational pathways and creating four regional subdivisions.

On 26 August, Radio New Zealand reported that a Tertiary Education Commission report dated 9 June 2022 had proposed reducing staff numbers at NZIST subsidiary polytechnics in order to avert a forecast deficit of NZ$110 million. The report described NZIST efforts to combat the deficit such as requiring frequent financial reports from polytechnics and restricting the recruitment of new staff as insufficient. The briefing paper also forecast that the completion of NZIST merger process in January 2023 could save the institution NZ$52 million a year.

In early September 2022, Newsroom reported that the delayed public consultation on NZIST organisational structure had failed to allay staff concerns about job security. Newsroom also reported unusually high turnover rates across the subsidiary polytechnics. Te Pūkenga also revised its forecast annual deficit to NZ$63 million, which included staff resignations and "one-off" land sales which had not been finalised. Tertiary Education Union president Tina Smith reported that many staff were anxious about the uncertainty and lack of information about their job specifications within the organisation's operating structure. National Party tertiary education spokesperson Simmonds criticised NZIST efforts to reduce its deficit via redundancies and asset sales as an unsustainable financial model.

On 8 September, the Otago Polytechnic Branch of the Tertiary Education Union reported that the merger process had caused low morale and increased workload among staff members at Otago Polytechnic. The Union also expressed concerns about scant information about NZIST direction, staff's place in the new organisation, and insufficient funding, and the loss of operational knowledge caused by job redundancies.

On 21 October, Acting CEO Winder stated that Te Pūkenga would consider staff redundancies as a means of reducing the organisation's deficit by NZ$35 million. This amount includes NZ$10m across work-based learning, NZ$25m across former polytechnics and the national office. Polytechnic staff have expressed concerns about the impact of the proposed redundancies on teaching and staff morale. As part of the cost-cutting exercise, NZIST subsidiary Otago Polytechnic confirmed that it would undergo a NZ$2.7 million cost cut, which raised concerns about job security among staff.

In mid June 2023, Winder announced that Te Pūkenga was planning to lay off 404 staff members. As part of restructuring proposals, the national polytechnic would cut 960 roles, with affected staff members being encouraged to apply for 550 new positions. According to Tertiary Education Union organiser Daniel Benson-Guiu, these job cuts would affect 90% of Te Pūkenga, with most of the job cuts being in management. In response to the proposed job cuts, Tertiary Education Union Universal College of Learning (UCOL) branch co-president Dee Brough sought further clarity from Te Pūkenga on the impact of job cuts at UCOL. On 21 June 2023, The Spinoff reported there was a high turnover of tutors and cancelled classes at the mega polytechnic.

In late August 2023, Radio New Zealand reported that the Tertiary Education Commission had wanted more job cuts in back-office and managerial roles than the 400 previously announced. In a June 2023 briefing, the Commission also expressed concerns about NZIST long-term plans. In response, the Tertiary Education Union criticised the Commission for overstepping its brief and said that its statement about job losses had alarmed its members. On 20 September, Te Pūkenga confirmed that 200 full-time jobs would be cut as part of a restructuring process.

In early November 2023, Radio New Zealand reported that Te Pūkenga was consulting on a restructure of its information technology division. These included plans to hire 53 people in 2024 in various areas including digital platforms for courses and cyber-security. Staff criticised the timing of the decision in light of the mega polytechnic laying off 200 full-time staff and possible plans by the incoming National-led coalition government to disestablish Te Pūkenga.

==== Academic freedom ====
On 13 March 2023, Chief Executive Winder issued a statement telling Te Pūkenga staff including academics that they were "public servants" and had to remain "politically neutral" ahead of the 2023 New Zealand general election. Winder's statement was criticised by Prime Minister Chris Hipkins and National Party education spokesperson Simmonds who defended academic staff members' right to academic freedom. Similarly, Public Service Commissioner Peter Hughes stated that Te Pūkenga was a tertiary institute and was thus not subject to the Commission's code of conduct or general election guidance. Academic freedom (but not institutional autonomy) is granted to the Institute's academic staff and students under Section 318 of the Education and Training Act, 2020.

=== Quality issues ===
In mid October 2023, Radio New Zealand reported that plumbers, gasfitters and drainlayers were unhappy with the quality of training provided by Te Pūkenga for their apprentices. Other issues included the cancellation of apprentices' block courses, the poor quality of training facilities, and poor communication between the mega polytechnic and apprentices. In response, Te Pūkenga stated that it had run 445 block courses in 2023 and had only cancelled 16 due to Cyclone Gabrielle and rescheduled 11 due to low student numbers. Te Pūkenga stated that it would develop new training programmes after the construction sector's workforce development council, Waihanga Ara Rau, had finished reviewing unit standards and qualifications for the plumbing, drain-laying and gasfitting industry.

=== Dissolution ===
On 8 December 2023, Tertiary Education Minister Penny Simmonds confirmed that the National-led coalition government would be dissolving Te Pūkenga and replacing it with eight to ten institutions. Simmonds stated that the Government would no longer centralise vocational training and education and asked Te Pūkenga to halt its transformation efforts and review the number of jobs. The regional polytechnics would be supported by a central entity that would oversee the training organisations. While the polytechnics would be able to make their own decisions regarding education, staffing and budgets, Simmonds suggested that some services could be shared. Simmonds also said that the Government would introduce legislation entrenching the dissolution of Te Pūkenga into law over the next six to eight months. In addition, NZIST council chair Murray Strong resigned following the Government's announcement. Simmonds has aimed for this revamp of the tertiary and vocational sector to be completed by 1 January 2025. She said the dissolution of Te Pūkenga will allow individual polytechnics control over their own destiny.

In response, Tertiary Education Union national secretary Sandra Grey expressed concern that the National Government's planned restructuring could undermine staff morale and that a reversal back to a non-centralised model would lead to unnecessary competition within the polytechnic sector. By contrast, former Otago Polytechnic CEO Phil Kerr welcomed the process, stating that "it would be a relatively simple process for the institutions to re-establish their presence as regional providers." Kerr also opined that some services such as curriculum development and student learning support could remain centralised. In addition, NZIST council chair Murray Strong announced his resignation from the organisation.

On 18 December, Te Pūkenga announced the resignation of its Chief Executive Peter Winder, citing the new direction of the organisation announced by the National Government. That same day, Newshub obtained leaked documents showing that none of the 16 component polytechnics were financially viable on their own, with a deficit totalling NZ$185 million. The worst affected institutions were Whitireia New Zealand and WelTec, which are both NZ$28 million in deficit. In addition, Waikato Institute of Technology had a debt of NZ$22.5 million, Open Polytechnic had a debt of NZ$22 million, and Toi Ohomai had a debt of nearly NZ$21 million. By the end of 2023, three deputy chief executives Dr Megan Gibbons (academic centre and learning systems), Teresa Pollard (chief digital officer) and Steven Turnbull (acting chief digital officer) had resigned from Te Pūkenga.

In February 2024, Te Pūkenga confirmed that it was returning to its former structure prior to the confirmation of the previous Labour Government's "Creating Our Futures" decision in September 2023, which affected 7,000 employees with many receiving letters confirming they would get their former jobs back. On 7 March 2024, Simmonds indicated that the dissolution of the mega polytechnic would possibly see the elimination of its head office and several providers merged. In late April 2024, Tertiary Education Union organiser Daniel Benson-Guiu asked the Tertiary Education Minister to reveal her plans for New Zealand's polytechnics in the wake of staff concerns about their job security. In response, Simmonds told the Otago Daily Times that she did not have clear timeframe for disestablishing Te Pūkenga and establishing new polytechnics since that would require legislative change. The Minister proposed taking an initial plan to Cabinet in mid-2024 and commence consulting regional stakeholders, staff and industry leaders about the proposed changes.

In early May 2024, Te Pūkenga confirmed that the number of enrolled workplace learners had dropped by 21% from 62,930 in April 2023 to 60,515 April 2024. By contrast, the number of enrolled polytechnic students had risen by 6% from 43,541 in April 2023 to 45,989 in April 2024. The workplace learning division was profitable in comparison to the polytechnic division, which was running at a loss. On 3 May, Simmonds confirmed that design options and a new legislative framework for the Polytechnic sector were being developed. In addition, Te Pūkenga commenced decentralising operations, established regional leaders and delegated more decision-making powers to the regions. The mega polytechnic's head office was also being reduced with staff being redeployed to the regions.

In mid-July 2024, the Tertiary Education Commission ordered Te Pūkenga to hire eight consultants from four organisations Volte Consulting, PricewaterhouseCoopers (PwC), Calibre Partners, and Deloitte to facilitate the disestablishment of the mega polytechnic and consult on a proposed replacement model. These consultants will also be tasked with facilitating a major cost-cutting exercise after forecasts revealed that NZIST constituent polytechnics face four years of financial losses including an NZ$118 million deficit for 2024. Volte Consulting's Rob Heaney and Richmond Tait will work with the Open Polytechnic, Ara, Unitec/Manukau Institute of Technology, the Nelson Marlborough Institute of Technology and Tai Poutini Polytechnic. John Fisk and Richard Nacey of PwC will work with the Eastern Institute of Technology, Western Institute of Technology at Taranaki, Universal College of Learning, and Wellington Institute of Technology/Whitireia New Zealand. Neale Jackson and Daniel Stoneman of Calibre Partners will work with Waikato Institute of Technology, Toi Ohomai Institute of Technology and NorthTec. Richard Bailey and Nichola Bennett of Deloitte will work with the Southern Institute of Technology and Otago Polytechnic. A TEC spokesperson said that these consultants were picked "due to both their knowledge of the tertiary sector, their significant experience in restructuring and turning around underperforming businesses and ability to work within tight timeframes.

On 20 December 2024, Tertiary Education Minister Simmonds confirmed that the Government would proceed with plans to dismantle Te Pūkenga following consultation. She said that the Government would decide in 2025 which polytechnics could be independent and which would be part of a federation. Simmonds also indicated that the Government was considering selling some polytechnics. She also confirmed that the Government would replace Workforce Development Councils with government-funded Industry Skills Boards as the regulatory bodies for different industries. In response to the Government's announcement, Tertiary Education Union national secretary Sandra Grey criticised the lack of detail in the government announcement and said that polytechnic staff were uncertain about their future. Civil Contractors New Zealand chief executive Allan Pollard expressed disappointment at the Government's plans to dissolve the Workforce Development Councils, which he said allowed the industry to give input into the skills and training of workplace trainees.

In mid March 2025, The Spinoff reported that Te Pūkenga would cut 150 jobs, close Wintec's Hamilton Gardens campus and eliminate multiple courses across several campus. These cutbacks were part of the planned disestablishment of the mega polytechnic. In mid-May 2025, Simmonds introduced legislation into Parliament to facilitate the dissolution of mega polytechnic Te Pūkenga. In response, Tertiary Education Union general secretary Daniel Benson-Guiu expressed concern about the lack of detail in the proposed bill about which polytechnics would stand alone, which would merge and which would be federated.

By mid-June 2025, NZIST polytechnics had reduced their staff numbers by 8.9% on a headcount basis and 4.9% on a full-time equivalent basis. However, staff-to-student ratios remained lower than the 2016–2017 academic year. In late June 2025, NZIST annual report found that the mega polytechnic had finished 2024 with a $16.6-million surplus and $382 million in savings.

On 14 July 2025, Simmonds confirmed Te Pūkenga would be replaced with 10 regional stand-alone polytechnics (Note: Ara Institute of Canterbury (Ara); Eastern Institute of Technology (EIT); Nelson Marlborough Institute of Technology (NMIT); Southern Institute of Technology (SIT); Toi Ohomai Institute of Technology; Waikato Institute of Technology (Wintec); Unitec Institute of Technology (Unitec) and Manukau Institute of Technology (MIT), which will combine into a single entity; Otago Polytechnic; Universal College of Learning (UCOL); The Open Polytechnic of New Zealand) from 1 January 2026. Te Pūkenga would be continue to operate until its disestablishment on 31 December 2026, in order to provide courses not offered by the stand-alone institutions. Four other institutions (Note: NorthTec; Western Institute of Technology at Taranaki (WITT); Whitireia Community Polytechnic and Wellington Institute of Technology (Whitireia and WelTec); Tai Poutini Polytechnic (TPP)) would remain part of Te Pūkenga until early 2026, awaiting a decision on their viability. The Government also plans to establish a new federation consisting of the Open Polytechnic, Otago Polytechnic and UCOL. In response, Labour's tertiary education spokesperson Shanan Halbert said that the Government was reverting to an unsustainable polytechnic model while NZIST chief financial officer James Smith expressed concern that the Government would have to bail out several polytechnics.

On 16 July 2025, The Spinoff reported that the Government had cut NZ$810 million in funding to Te Pūkenga as part of its plan to disestablish the mega polytechnic. In addition, the mega polytechnic lost 855 staff between 2023 and 2024; amounting to the loss of ten percent of its workforce.

On 1 January 2026, ten of Te Pukenga's constituent polytechnics and all work-based learning organisations exited the mega polytechnic to become independent entities again. In mid-February 2026, the Government allocated NZ$325 million to the ten newly independent polytechnics formed from the planned disestablishment of Te Pūkenga and NZ$62.7 million to the five Industry Skill Boards replacing the mega polytechnic's seven work-based training divisions. Simmonds said that these funds would cover the newly reconstituent organisations' spending expenditures for three months and ring-fenced funding they took with them prior to joining Te Pūkenga. The four remaining polytechnics affiliated with Te Pukenga–NorthTec, Tai Poutini Polytechnic, the Western Institute of Technology at Taranaki and Whitireia New Zealand & Wellington Institute of Technology are expected to exit the mega polytechnic on 1 January 2027. Te Pukenga is expected to continue operating until late 2026 or March 2027.

In early May 2026, the Tertiary Education Union commenced negotiations to secure a single collective bargaining agreement for all polytechnics, including those that had left NZIST and those remaining with the mega polytechnic.

In the lead up to the 2026 election, the Labour Party's tertiary education spokesperson, Shanan Halbert, has said the Party did not intend to reestablish Te Pūkenga.
