= Unitec Institute of Technology =

University in New Zealand

Coordinates: 36°52′40″S 174°42′28″E

Unitec
- Established: 1976; 50 years ago
- Chief Executive: Professor Christina Hong
- Students: 15,420 EFTS (2015)
- Location: Auckland, New Zealand
- Website: www.unitec.ac.nz

Unitec (Māori: Te Whare Wānanga o Wairaka) is the largest institute of technology in Auckland, New Zealand. 16,844 students study programmes from certificate to postgraduate degree level (levels 1 to 9) across a range of subjects.

The main campus is situated in Mt Albert while a secondary Waitākere campus is situated in Henderson and there are various pop-ups throughout the North Shore. It also offers programs overseas.

== History ==
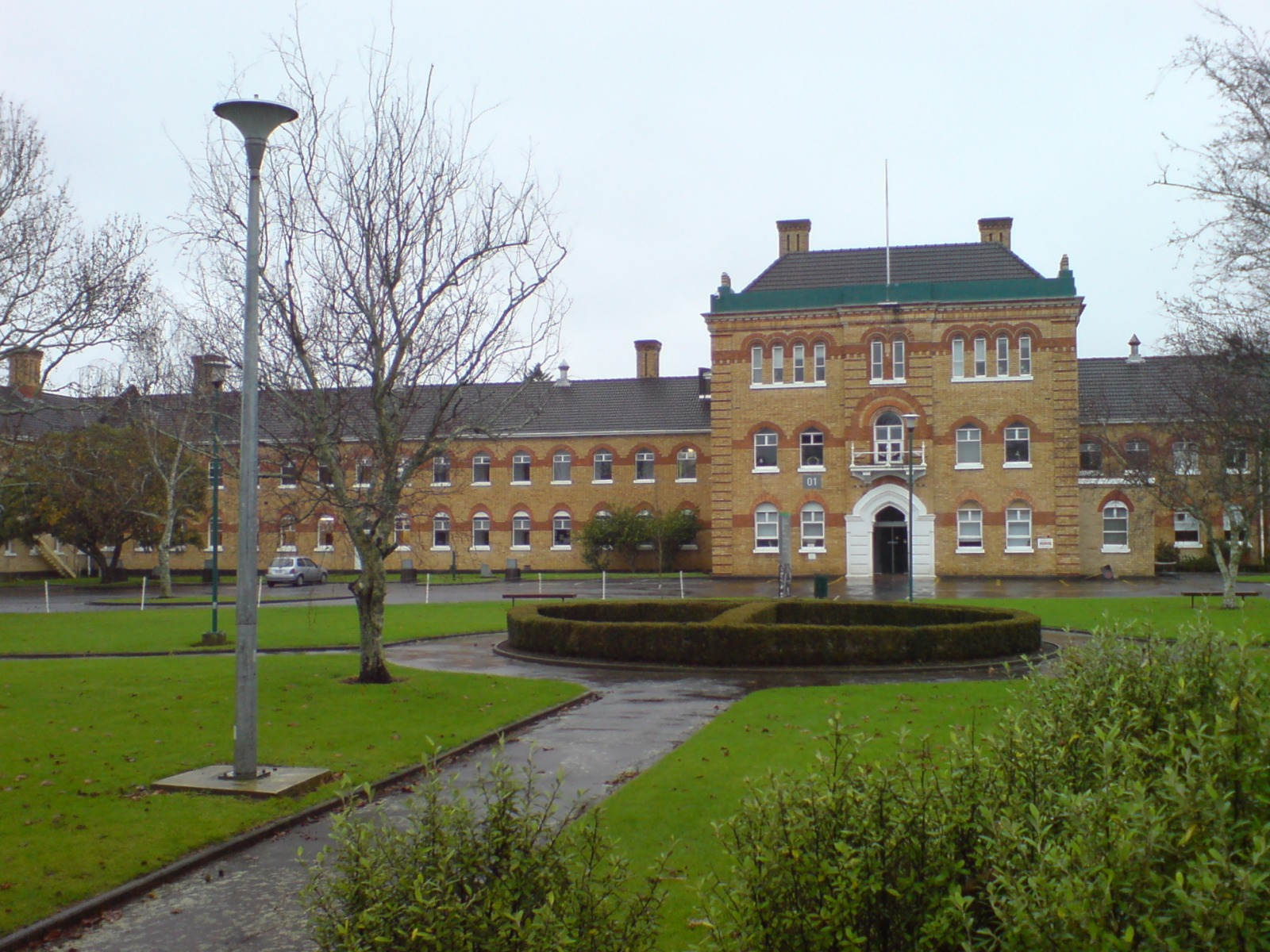
Unitec Mt Albert campus, Carrington Road

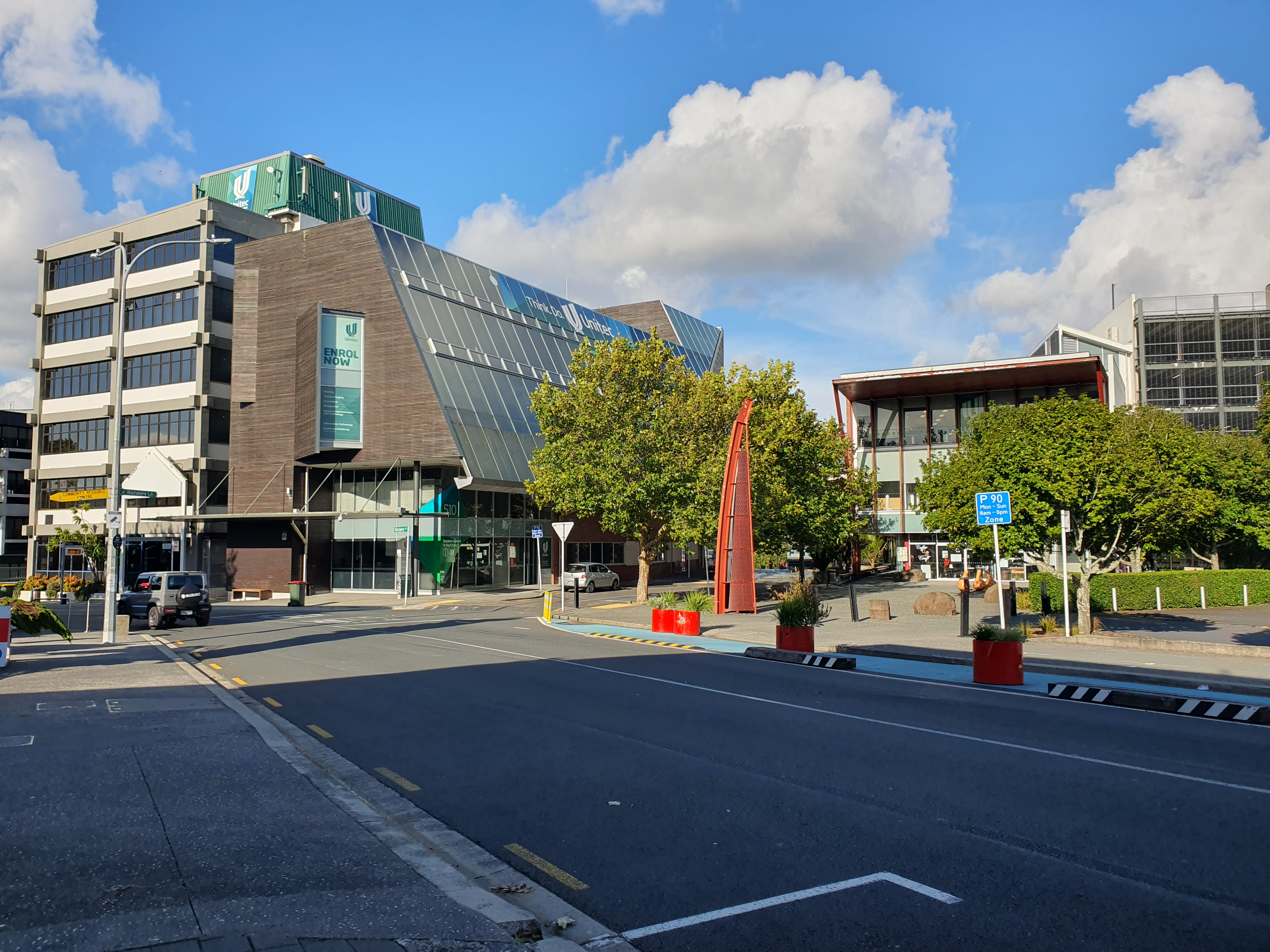
Unitec Waitākere campus in Henderson

=== Origins ===
Unitec was founded as Carrington Technical Institute in 1976 on the Mt Albert site on Carrington road, which has 55 hectares of grounds. The area on which Unitec's main campus is located was formerly home to the Whau Lunatic Asylum, later known as Carrington Hospital.

The name changed to Carrington Polytechnic in 1987 and then to "Unitec Institute of Technology" in 1994. Unitec applied for University status in 1999, but the Government ruled, somewhat controversially, in 2005 that Unitec did not meet the academic criteria of a university and would remain an Institute of Technology.

=== Expansion ===
In 2006, Unitec opened its Waitakere Campus in the centre of Henderson, West Auckland. The campus is a joint development with the former Waitakere City Council and includes the new Waitākere Central Library. Unitec's Waitakere campus offers introductory computing, community development, and nursing courses.

In August 2011, Unitec opened a campus in Albany, on Auckland's North Shore, but it was closed in December 2016. On 1 April 2020, Unitec Institute of Technology became a subsidiary of Te Pūkenga (the New Zealand Institute of Skills and Technology) alongside the 15 other institutes of technology and polytechnics (ITPs).

=== Merger into Te Pūkenga, 2020–2025 ===
In July 2018 Unitec made the news after revealing deficits totaling nearly $100 million over four years and prompting the Education Minister Chris Hipkins to consider interventions. It was not alone by September 2018 there were four of the country's polytechnics at a high financial risk with 10 making deficits and none were expected to make the surplus that the government required.

In 2019 a major restructure across the polytechnic sector was announced. On 1 April 2020, Unitec was subsumed into Te Pūkenga (the New Zealand Institution of Skills & Technology) alongside the 15 other Institutions of Technology and Polytechnics (ITPs).

In 2023, Unitec started charging parking fees.(Unitec,2023)

=== Merger with MIT ===
In July 2025, the Vocational Education Minister Penny Simmonds announced that Te Pūkenga would be disestablished. She also announced that Unitec and the Manukau Institute of Technology would be merged into a new polytechnic entity.

On 1 January 2026, the combined Unitec/MIT polytechnic entity formally exited Te Pukenga and became an independent entity. In mid-February 2026, the Government allocated NZ$52 million to the combined Unitec/MIT polytechnic to assist with the transition.

== Campus libraries ==
There are two libraries across the two campuses:

- Mt Albert, Te Puna Library
- Waitakere Campus Library

== Courses ==
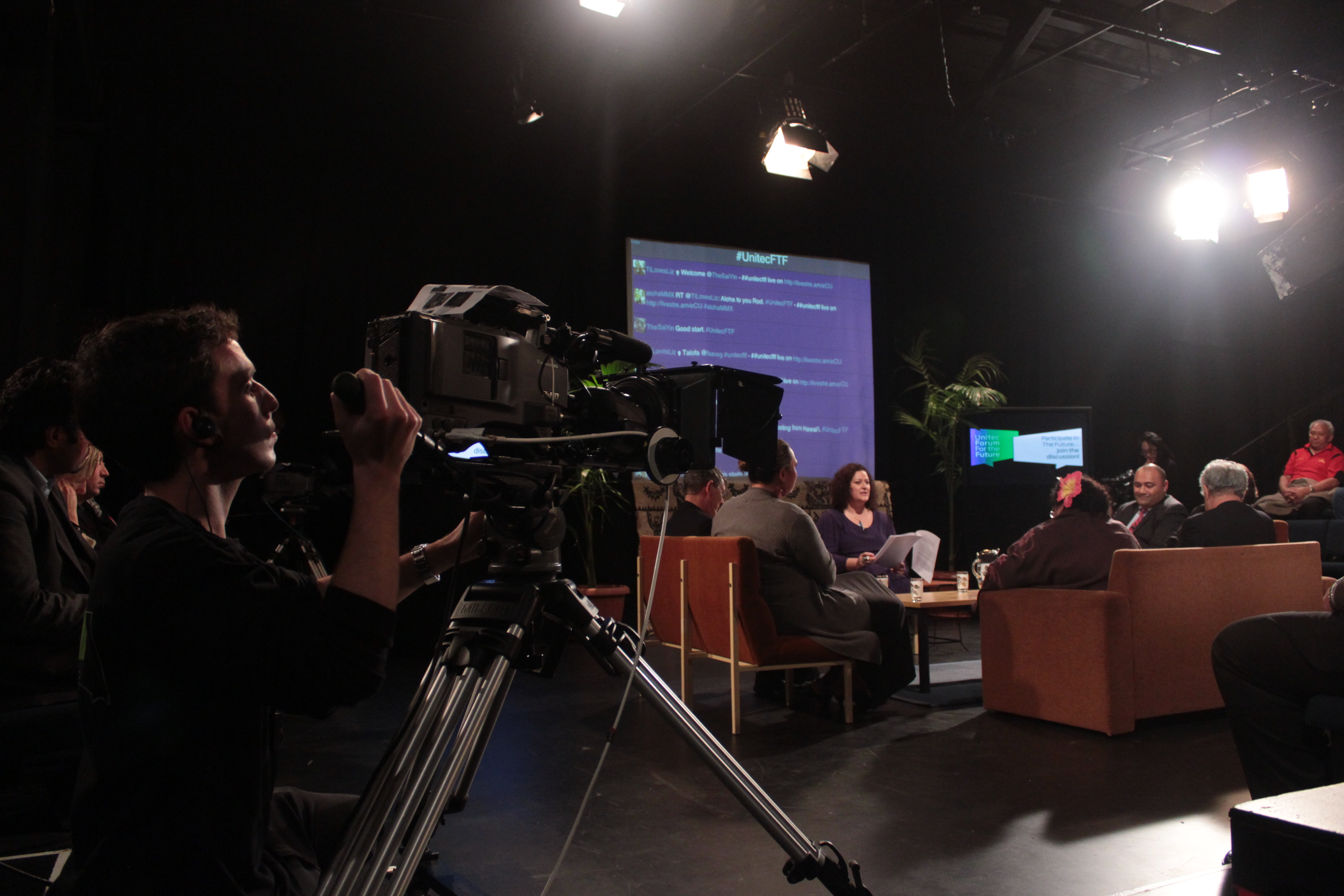
Unitec Forum of the Future 2011

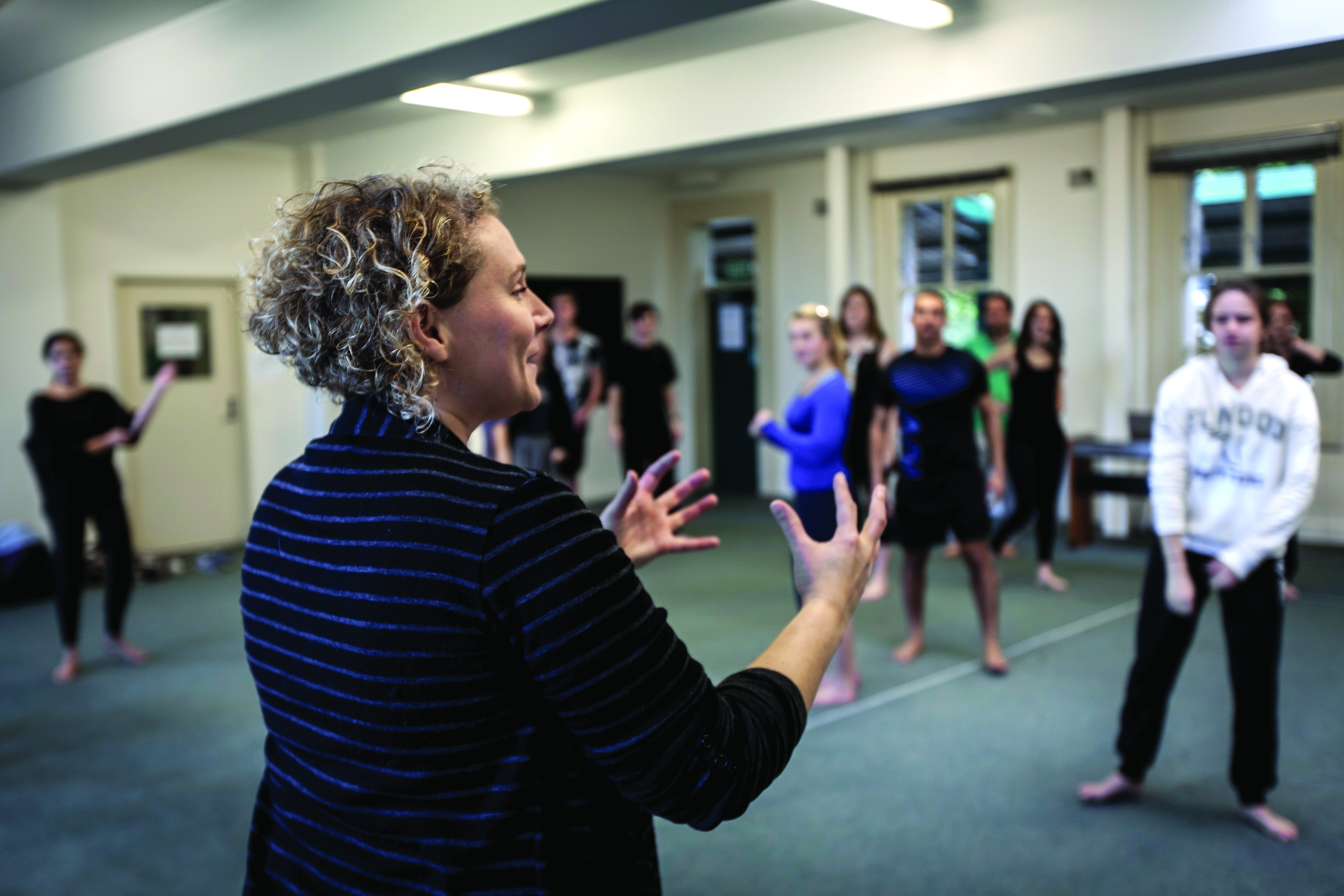
Voice class – Unitec 2015

=== Study areas ===
- Animal Health, Management and Welfare
- Architecture: Architecture, Landscape Architecture, Interior Design and Landscaping and Garden Design
- Arts: Art and Design (Graphic Design and Animation, Photography, Product and Furniture Design, Visual Arts), Performing Arts and Screen Arts (Acting, Contemporary Dance, Screen Arts)
- Bridging Education: Study and Career Preparation
- Business: Accounting and Finance, Digital Marketing, Management (Operations and Human Resources), Marketing.
- Computing and Information Technology: Business Intelligence, Computer Networks, Cloud Computing, Cyber security, Game Development, Internet of Things, Software Engineering
- Conservation, Ecology and Biodiversity Management
- Construction: Construction Management, Quantity Surveying, Property Development, Construction Supervision
- Early Childhood Education
- Education Studies
- Engineering: Automotive, Civil, Electrical and Electronics, and Land Surveying
- Healthcare: Nursing and Medical Imaging
- Language Studies – Teaching English, Interpreting, English (as an additional language), IELTS, and Māori
- Policing
- Social Work and Community Development
- Sport, Exercise and Recreation: Exercise, Sport Coaching, and Community Sport and Recreation
- Supported Learning
- Trades: Automotive Engineering, Building and Carpentry, Electrical, Fabrication, Welding, Mechanical, Plumbing, Gasfitting, and Drainlaying
- Veterinary Nursing

=== Qualifications ===
Unitec teaches over 128 courses ranging from Short Courses to master's degrees.

- 12 Postgraduate Diploma and Master's Degree programs
- 33 Bachelors Diplomas and Graduate Diploma programs
- 17 Diploma programs
- 44 Academic certificate programs
- 22 Short Course programs

The emphasis in all learning areas is for a lot of practical (hands-on) learning as well as theoretical learning. This differs from the traditional model of university-level tuition, which is predominantly theory. For example, the Introduction to Policing course is delivered in partnership with the New Zealand Police. Also, the School of Computing Science has an industry internship program with IBM, which includes the IBM Center at the Mt Albert (Carrington) Campus.
