= Waikato Institute of Technology =

New Zealand institute of technology

- Te Kuratini o Waikato
- Other name: Wintec
- Former names: Hamilton Technical College, Waikato Technical Institute
- Type: Vocational
- Established: 1968
- Students: 8,830 (2023)
- Location: Hamilton, Waikato, New Zealand
- Campus: Urban
- Colors: Yellow and black
- Website: http://www.wintec.ac.nz/

The Waikato Institute of Technology, also known as Wintec, is an institute of technology based in New Zealand's Waikato region. It was established in 1968 as the Waikato Technical Institute after the split of the Hamilton Technical College. Originally a small technical college, the Waikato Institute of Technology is now part of Te Pūkenga, one of the country's biggest tertiary education providers.

The institute reached a peak of enrolments in 2018, with 10,050 students. As of 2023, the figures currently sit at 8,830. Wintec has two main campuses, the City Campus and Rotokauri Campus. As well as the Ōtorohanga and Waikato Trades Academy regional facilities. The City Campus hosts the School of Media Arts and Te Kōpū Mānia o Kirikiriroa Marae. The facilities for animal care, cookery, engineering, hospitality, sports science, and the trades are located on the Rotokauri Campus.

The institute has a particular focus on tertiary training for nurses, social workers, midwives, graphic designers, performing artists, engineers, trades people, early-childhood teachers, horticulturists, arborists and sport scientists. In 2024, Wintec won the Global Operator Award in the Westpac Waikato Business Awards.

Currently, Waikato Institute of Technology is New Zealand's only tertiary institution which operates an international college in China.

== History ==
=== Origins, 1916–1968 ===
The Waikato Institute of Technology saw its humble beginnings back in 1916, with the Technical Advisory Committee at Hamilton West School establishing evening classes in a comprehensive range of practical subjects, such as Plumbing, Woodworking and Engineering. In 1920, these classes expanded into full-time day classes, with the Technical College then being known as the Hamilton Manual Training Centre and/or the Hamilton Technical Day School. These classes accommodated a small number of day pupils, as well as roughly 1000 primary school pupils.

As the school grew, the student population soon became too large to house in its original building, and so it moved to the building now known as Wintec House. The building was completed and opened in 1924, alongside the school being established as Hamilton Technical College, with a new board and governors to operate the institution. Of note amongst this governing body was the college's first principal Whampoa Fraser, a reputable educationalist, after whom the college was renamed to become Fraser High School in 1968.

=== Waikato Technical Institute, 1968–2021 ===
After several decades of operation, further courses for apprentice training, and technician training in courses such as Motor Engineering and Draughting were introduced over several years from 1949 to the mid-1950s. The pivotal point in history, however, came in 1968, where the college split into two different institutions: Waikato Technical Institute, and Fraser High School. Both institutions began operating on the same site, providing secondary and tertiary technical training, with a concrete wall dividing the two schools. Waikato Technical Institute's first classes began on 12 February that year, with a total staff of 40, including 30 full-time tutors working for the institute, and 2000 students enrolling in the first months of operation.

After two years of co-existence between the two institutions, government policy at the time led to Wintec House being allocated wholly to Waikato Technical Institute, with Fraser High School relocating to Ellicott Road in 1970, where it still operates to this day. As the years went by, the Institute saw continued growth, and expanded the range of courses it offered, such as the introduction of Horticulture courses at the Hamilton Gardens in 1985, and Business Management and Building Trades courses being offered around this same time. This expansion led to the Institute being renamed The Waikato Polytechnic in 1987, aligning it with other NZ tertiary institutions of the time.

Government reforms in the 1990s also saw the institute become a body corporate with a Chief Executive and Council, which changed the way in which property title ownership was handled by the institute. Perhaps unsurprisingly, this led to more campuses being established in the area, with satellite campuses opening in Te Kūiti and Thames, as well as land being purchased on Avalon Drive to establish Wintec Rotokauri (then known as the Avalon Campus) - a campus aimed at trades, sports, and hospitality training. Alongside the government reforms and campus expansion, changes in employment needs led to the development of multiple degrees by the institute, with the first of many – a Bachelor of Business – being offered in 1992. The first postgraduate qualification came later in 2000, with the offer of the Post Graduate Diploma in Nursing.

=== Wintec, 2001–2020 ===
In 2001, the institution changed its name to the currently known Waikato Institute of Technology, with the now known Wintec brand only appearing two years later in 2003.

Further building expansion and improvement occurred over the following decades, with the award-winning Gallagher Hub opening in 2007, and Wintec House undergoing a $17m refurbishment to reopen in 2010. The newly improved building housed the Waikato Chamber of Commerce, Opportunity Hamilton and other organizations, and provided important links between courses of study and local businesses. In 2013, the Media Arts complex was refurbished, alongside the PWC Centre, a multi-story office building, being constructed next to Wintec House.

Wintec also expanded internationally, with Jinhua Polytechnic Wintec International College opening in China in 2015, a second international college opening in Guizhou, China in 2018, and the Qindao Training Centre, a collaboration between Wintec and Qindao Training College opening that same year. In 2019, a physiotherapy school was established at Wintec.

=== Te Pūkenga, 2020–2025 ===
On 1 April 2020, the Sixth Labour Government established a new mega polytechnic called Te Pūkenga (the New Zealand Institute of Skills and Technology), which consisted of the country's 16 state-owned polytechnics including Wintec.

In May 2021, the Tertiary Education Commission reported that it had worked with Te Pūkenga and the Wintec division to boost learner success including a successful pilot project in June 2019 which became the basis for the Commission's Learner Success Framework."

On 31 May 2022, Wintec's operations were absorbed into Te Pūkenga. Before Waikato Institute of Technology (Wintec) moved into Te Pūkenga, a number of operational changes were made. This includes Wintec chief executive Dave Christiansen assuming the role of Te Pūkenga ITP transition lead." Following this move, Wintec redirected all references to Wintec and the Waikato Institute of Technology on its website to Te Pūkenga and its Wintec business division."

During the 2023 New Zealand general election, the New Zealand National Party campaigned on disestablishing Te Pūkenga in order to "restore local decision-making."

Following the formation of a National-led coalition government in November 2023, the Minister for Tertiary Education and Skills Penny Simmonds confirmed that the Government would begin disestablishing Te Pūkenga as part its "100-day plan." She told Radio New Zealand that "although a lot of money had been spent in terms of employing people at head office [and] Te Pūkenga was not delivering its promised efficiencies." Instead of having one organisation to manage all vocational institutions, the National-led coalition government indicated that they were "looking at keeping eight to 10 institutions across the country with some shared services where it made sense."

Since the government announced its intention to disestablish Te Pūkenga, "at least 154 roles, one campus and multiple courses across 10 institutes of technology and polytechnics (ITPs) have been cut". Wintec was reportedly the hardest it in the "first tranche of cuts between November 27, 2023 and December 19, 2024 … with 46 full-time equivalent roles (FTEs) cut, its Hamilton Gardens campus set to close and 12 courses scrapped". Wintec also froze new enrolments to its arts courses. Around the time of their 100-year anniversary celebrations in October 2024, Wintec released cost-saving proposals outlining staff and course cuts due to budget concerns. They noted that factors such as declining domestic roles, cost increases, changes to funding models, and COVID-19 related issues resulted in a hit to their cash reserves, resulting in the need to borrow operating funds from Te Pūkenga and implement these cost-saving measures.

As of 4 May 2025, an online statement by Wintec said that study and training programmes would continue while the Government implemented plans to disestablish Te Pūkenga. Furthermore, the same statement also reiterated their commitment "to ensuring that organisational changes that need to be made to meet the Government's expectations do not impact the delivery of our programmes and training for our learners and employers."

In July 2025, Simmonds announced that the Government would return Wintec and nine other polytechnics to regional governance by 1 January 2026.

=== Regaining independence, 2026–present ===
On 1 January 2026, Wintec formally left Te Pukenga to become an independent entity again. In mid-February 2026, the Government allocated over NZ$24 million to Wintec to support its transition. In mid-April 2026, Wintec chief executive Warwick Pitts reported that the polytechnic had posted a surplus of $1.65 million in 2025.

== Campuses and facilities ==
The Waikato Institute of Technology has two main campuses located in Hamilton, New Zealand. As well as two regional facilities located in Ōtorohanga and Thames in the Waikato region.

=== Hamilton City Campus ===
The City Campus in the Hamilton CBD hosts the majority of Wintec's students and facilities. The School of Media Arts, Te Kōpū Mānia o Kirikiriroa Marae, and the Gallagher Hub; an events centre, are focal points of the campus. There are a range of amenities including health services, the main library, eateries, and the Wintec apartments.

=== Rotokauri Campus ===
The Rotokauri Campus, established in 1995 as the Avalon Campus, is located in the semi-rural suburb of Rotokauri, Hamilton. The campus covers 56 hectares and hosts the facilities for sport science, trades, engineering, animal care, hospitality, and cookery. The Rotokauri Eco Village is on site as student accommodation.

=== Te Kōpū Mānia o Kirikiriroa Marae ===
Te Kōpū Mānia o Kirikiriroa Marae opened in 2012 on the City Campus in Hamilton. It was given its name in respect to the surrounding area, which was known to Māori for its fertile soil and gardens. Te Kōpū Mānia o Kirikiriroa translates to "smooth/fertile belly of Kirikiriroa (Hamilton)." Growing numbers of students have opted to have their graduation ceremonies held at the marae.

== Structure and governance ==
Prior to Wintec's integration into Te Pūkenga, Wintec had its own constitution, as other educational institutions do under the Education Act 1989. This constitution was last amended in 2019. Under the constitution, the Council of Wintec had ten members, four of whom were appointed by the Minister of Education and six of whom were appointed by the council. Of those six Wintec Council appointees, one needed to be a student elected by the student body, and one needed to be a permanent member of the general or teaching staff appointed by the permanent general and teaching staff.

In 2020, during the transition to becoming a subsidiary of Te Pūkenga, Te Pūkenga's establishment board appointed six directors to Wintec's board to help facilitate its transition. This board remained in place until 2022, when Wintec became one of the first Institutes of Skills and Technology or Polytechnics to be integrated into Te Pūkenga.

Within Te Pūkenga, Wintec retains some autonomy through its executive leadership team, which currently consists of eight members led by Warwick Pitts, who serves as Operational Lead and previously served as an executive director. What Wintec's leadership will look like when Te Pūkenga is due to be disestablished in 2026 is currently unclear.

== Faculties ==
- Centre for Beauty Therapy, Hairdressing & Hospitality
- Centre for Business & Enterprise
- Centre for Information Technology
- Centre for Engineering & Industrial Design
- Centre for Health & Social Practice
- Centre for Languages
- School of Media Arts
- Centre for Applied Science & Primary Industries
- Centre for Sport Science & Human Performance
- Centre for Trades
- Centre for Research & Applied Innovation
- Centre for Education & Foundation Pathways
- Design Factory NZ
