= Universal College of Learning =

Technical school in Palmerston North, New Zealand

Coordinates: 40.35256°S 175.61271°E

Universal College of Learning (UCOL)
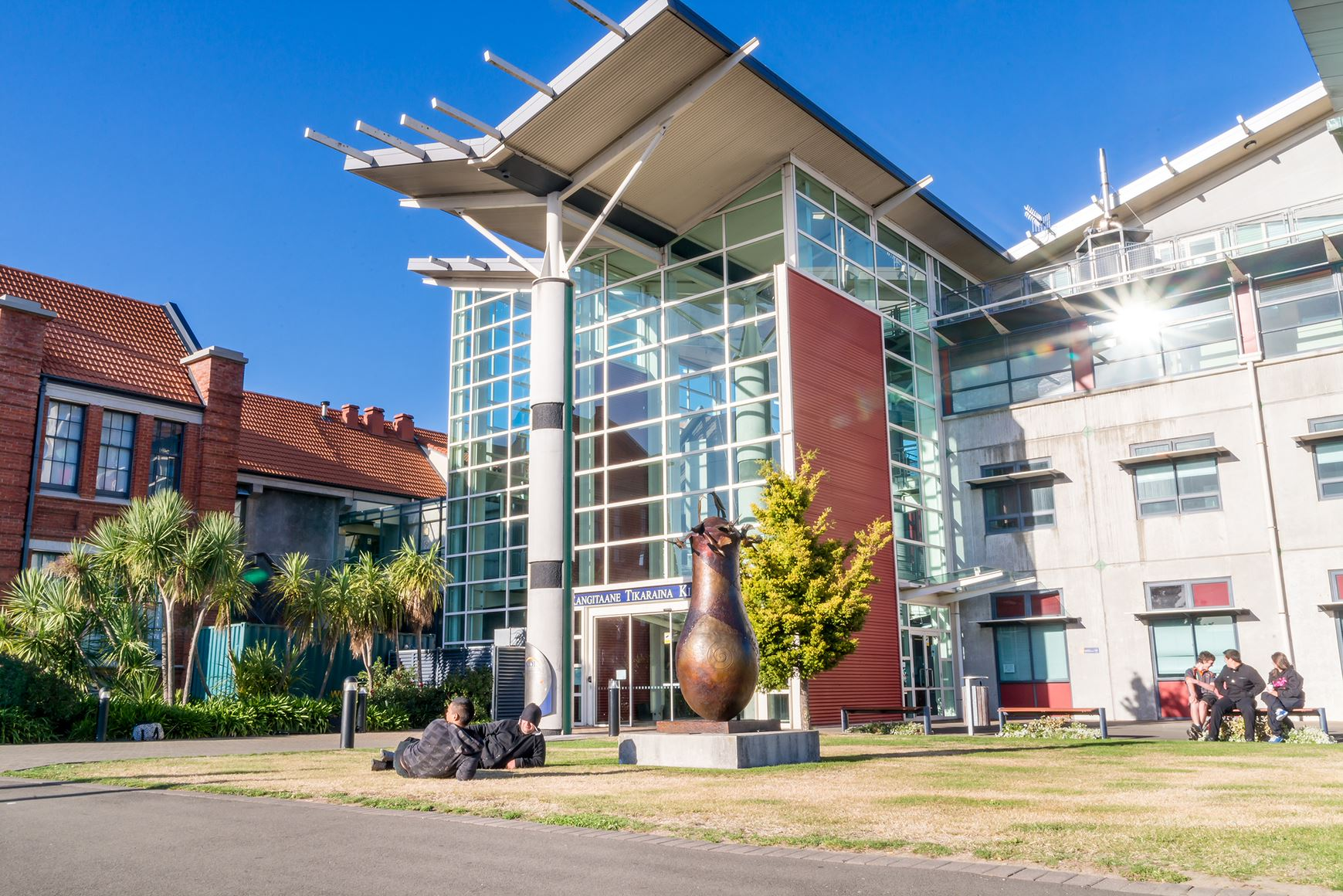
- UCOL Palmerston North campus building
- Motto: To inspire students, businesses and communities to succeed
- Established: 1892
- Academic staff: 460 (2020)
- Students: 5,786 students (2020) (Māori 30%, Pakeha 60%, others 10%)
- Location: Palmerston North, Whanganui, Masterton and Levin, New Zealand
- Affiliations: Public NZ TEI
- Website: www.ucol.ac.nz

The Universal College of Learning (UCOL) is a New Zealand Polytechnic with campuses located in Palmerston North, Whanganui, Masterton and Levin. Jasmine Groves is the Chief Executive.

== History ==
Founded in 1892 as the Palmerston North Technical School, it has seen several name changes over the years becoming the Palmerston North Technical Institute in 1971, the Manawatu Polytechnic in 1983, and Universal College of Learning (UCOL) in 1998. As part of government-ordered reforms, UCOL was part of Te Pūkenga New Zealand Institute of Skills and Technology from 2020-2025. Following the disbandment of Te Pūkenga, from 1 January 2026, UCOL is now a standalone autonomous entity. Initially specialising in trade apprenticeship courses, art/visual design classes, along with a range of night school programmes in business studies for working adults. As successive governments emphasised vocational education, the Polytechnic broadened the courses offered but retained a focus on core vocational programmes. It now delivers Foundation and Certificate programmes, Diplomas, Degrees, Post-Graduate, and Masters options in a range of subjects as well as community-based programmes.

In 1987, the then Manawatū Polytechnic opened a small campus in Horowhenua, Levin It focused on horticulture and business programmes between 1987 and 2006, however in 2006, the classes halted due to a nationwide downturn in and an upsurge in PTE (Private Training Establishment) competition.

UCOL expanded in January 2001 with the incorporation of the Masterton Regional Polytechnic. The Masterton Regional Polytechnic was founded in 1869 as the Masterton Technical School. In 1908 it was renamed the Seddon Memorial Technical School and in 1937 it amalgamated with Wairarapa High School to form New Zealand's first co-educational combined school, Wairarapa College. Initially, it specialised in teaching mainly chemistry, cookery, drawing, and dress-making classes. Later on, it offered day classes for high school students alongside its night classes for working adults. In 1988, it became the Wairarapa Community Polytechnic. During the 80's and 90's it followed a philosophy of being 'a polytechnic without walls.' One initiative in 1989 was their trail-blazing computer bus, which toured Wairarapa back roads and gave rural residents the chance to upgrade their computer skills.

UCOL expanded further with the integration of the Wanganui Regional Community Polytechnic on 1 April 2002. The Wanganui Regional Community Polytechnic, initially called the Wanganui Technical School of Design, had been launched in 1892. At the time it focused on evening classes in art, geometry, and machine/building construction. In 1911, the renamed Wanganui Technical College started teaching general secondary school courses. In 1964 it became Wanganui Boys' College, as female pupils shifted to the co-ed Wanganui High School. In 1984 the senior technical division of the Boys' College was turned into an organisation of its own right, the Wanganui Regional Community College. Its principal, John Scott, was the first person of Māori descent to head a New Zealand polytechnic. The college's popular summer art school programme was held each January from 1985 to 1994, and attracted up to 300 students. It was the largest programme of its kind in the country. In 1990 the name was changed to the Wanganui Regional Community Polytechnic. John's successor in 1994, Stephen Town, was the country's youngest polytechnic sector head, at age 34.

In mid-2017, UCOL relaunched in Levin, with a focus on helping develop in-demand skills for the local economy. Programmes include construction, carpentry, beauty therapy, health and wellbeing, business admin, early childhood education, and te reo.

On 1 April 2020, UCOL was subsumed into Te Pūkenga – New Zealand Institute of Skills and Technology alongside the 15 other Polytechnics (ITPs) and 11 Institutes of Technology (Industry Training Organisations or ITOs)

In July 2025, the Vocational Education Minister Penny Simmonds announced that UCOL would leave Te Pūkenga and be a stand-alone autonomous entity with the choice to join a new federation of polytechnics consisting of Otago Polytechnic and The Open Polytechnic of New Zealand.

On 1 January 2026, UCOL formally left Te Pukenga and became an independent entity again. In mid-February 2026, the Government allocated about NZ$11 million to UCOL to support its transition.

== Facilities ==
There are four campuses: Palmerston North, Whanganui, Masterton and Levin.

=== Palmerston North campus facilities ===
- TOEFL iBT Testing Centre
- Ambitions Training Restaurant
- Hair and Beauty Salon
- Palmerston North Weightlifting Club (affiliated with Olympic Weightlifting New Zealand)

=== Whanganui campus facilities ===
- Hair and Beauty Salon

=== Masterton campus facilities ===
- Hair and Beauty Salon

== Strategic priorities ==
UCOL is focused on delivering the six priorities of the Tertiary Education Strategy 2014–2019.

- Delivering skills for industry
- Getting at-risk young people into a career
- Boosting achievement of Māori and Pasifika
- Improving adult literacy and numeracy
- Strengthening researched-based institutions
- Growing international linkages

== Relationships-based teaching ==
UCOL is the first to employ a relationships-based teaching approach in a tertiary education setting. Called Te Atakura, the programme was developed with the support of education consultancy Cognition Education Limited and Emeritus Professor Russell Bishop. It is designed to enhance Māori success, develop high performing teaching teams and provide ongoing support services for learners.

== Study offerings ==
UCOL offers over 100 programmes of study at certificate, diploma, and degree levels in the following subject areas:

- Applied Science (medical imaging, laboratory science, foundation science)
- Automotive and Panel & Paint
- Beauty & Hairdressing
- Business (administration, management, project management, accounting, tourism, small business)
- Chef Training & Hospitality
- Construction & Built Environment (furniture design, carpentry & joinery, construction & architecture, infrastructure works, plumbing, gasfitting, & drainlaying)
- Creative (graphic design, motion pictures, animation, fashion design, printmaking, glassmaking, illustration, interior design, music, photography)
- Education (teaching adults, early childhood education)
- Exercise & Sport Science (physical conditioning, sports performance)
- Engineering (mechanical engineering, electrical engineering, fabrication engineering)
- Foundation skills (Māori language, sign language, computing skills, English language, literacy, numeracy)
- Health & Wellbeing (social service, mental health)
- Information Technology (computer networks, software development, business information systems, information & communications technology)
- Language & Culture (English language studies, sign language courses, Māori studies, Samoan language studies)
- Nursing & Enrolled Nursing (nursing)
- Vet Nursing & Animal Care
- In school programmes – part-time study options for high school students seeking to transition into tertiary study whilst attaining NCEA credits.
- Study Online (business, adult education, information technology)

In late 2016 UCOL secured funding from the Tertiary Education Commission's Refugee English Language Fund to give a limited number of eligible refugees the opportunity to study New Zealand Certificate in English at Level 3 or Level 4 free of charge.

== Council awards ==
Each year UCOL recognises people in the community who have made significant contributions to their local areas and society in general, with the UCOL Council Honours Awards. In 2019 UCOL recognised the contribution of their graduates with their inaugural UCOL Alumni Awards.
