= Wellington Institute of Technology =

Polytechnic in New Zealand

Coordinates: 41.2244°S 174.8847°E

- Te Whare Wānanga o te Awakairangi
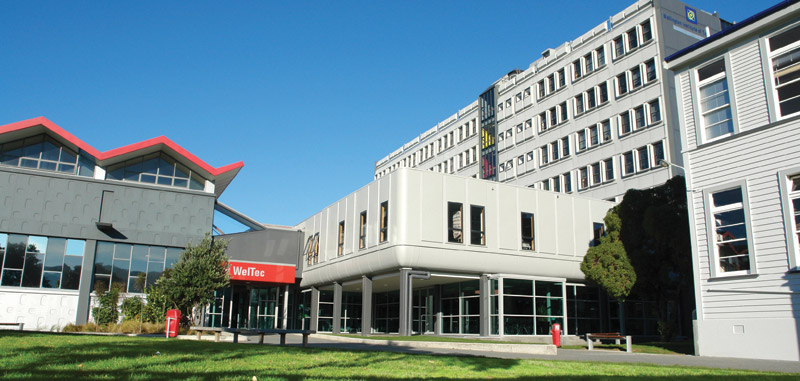
- View of the WelTec Petone student hub from the rear entrance.
- Other name: WelTec
- Motto: Māori: Te ako ngātahi. Te whakaahua kētanga o te tangata.
- Motto in English: Learning together. Transforming lives.
- Type: Public
- Established: 2001; 25 years ago (as WelTec)
- Affiliations: Public NZ TEI
- Chief Executive: Mark Oldershaw
- Academic staff: 229 (as of 2017)
- Administrative staff: 35 (as of 2017)
- Students: 3746 full-time students (as of 2017)
- Undergraduates: 2000 (as of 2017)
- Postgraduates: 325 (as of 2017)
- Location: Petone, Wellington, New Zealand
- Campus: Multiple
- Colours
- Website: www.whitireiaweltec.ac.nz
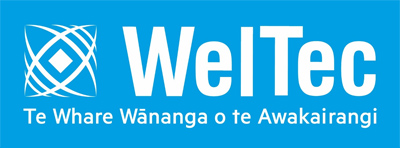

The Wellington Institute of Technology, also known as WelTec, is a New Zealand polytechnic based in Petone, Lower Hutt. WelTec was formed in 2001 by an amalgamation between the Central Institute of Technology (established in 1960) and the Hutt Valley Polytechnic (established in 1904) In 2020, WelTec, along with 15 other national polytechnics, became subsidiaries of Te Pūkenga – New Zealand Institute of Skills and Technology.

WelTec delivers vocational education to about 8,000 students every year.

WelTec offers over 130 courses in disciplines ranging from hospitality, business, information technology, visual arts, counselling, engineering, construction and creativity.

== History ==
=== Formation of Petone Technical School and name changes (1904–1960) ===
WelTec was formed in 1904 as the Petone Technical School at a different site in rented buildings. In 1908 the polytechnic moved to its current site in Petone on Kensington Avenue. The new technical school building (situated off Buick Street) was formally opened on 26 February 1909, by the Hon. G. Fowlds, the current Minister of Education at the time.

The polytechnic went through multiple name changes; including Petone Technical College, Hutt Valley Memorial Technical College, Petone Technical Institute and Hutt Valley Polytechnic.

=== Central Institute of Technology (1960–2000) ===
==== Formation ====
The Central Institute of Technology (or CIT) was a polytechnic formed in 1960, originally as the Central Technical College before its name change in 1963. The polytechnic was originally based in the Petone Technical College. Construction of the Heretaunga site began in 1970, with the site moving in stages to the new campus.

The first stage of pharmacy, science and engineering departments, consisting of three lecture theatres and a block of classrooms, was opened by the Prime Minister at the time, Norman Kirk, on 27 April 1973. The second stage, a halls of residence, consisted of a seven-storey tower block providing accommodation for up to 500 students, along with training facilities for the polytechnics hotel administration courses. The halls of residence opened in February 1978. The third stage added a library, a television production studio, computer-training facilities, areas for training in heating, ventilation, and aeronautics, along with buildings for the management school. The fourth and final stage implemented health science facilities. Courses were transferred from Petone as Heretaunga facilities were completed.

==== Transfer of health sciences and protests ====
In mid-1989, the Minister of Health Helen Clark announced that the polytechnics pharmacy training classes would be moved to the University of Otago, and that occupational-therapy training would move to Auckland. She was met with protesters while attending a polytechnic teachers' conference in Trentham in May.

On 31 October 1989, as a result of the Department of Education's Wellington Regional Polytechnic review, the school of health sciences would be relocated to Wellington Polytechnic, closer to the hospital and the School of Nursing.

==== Premise upgrades ====
After a failed proposal to start a casino school in 1992, the podiatry school was opened in 1992 by Associate Minister of Health at the time, Katherine O'Regan. An aerobics facility was opened to the public the same year, following the entrance of YMCA into receivership and the closure of five of their gymnasiums.

An upgrade to the podiatry school was announced in 1993, including top of the line resources; a surgical unit with two suites, examination rooms, X-ray facilities, recovery rooms and sterilisation facilities. The facility was built on top of the former orthotics and prosthetics site. The same year a lecture theatre was built containing full media facilities. This was located between the northern and western wings of the main group of buildings.

In 1994 the site was hosting courses for the Victoria University of Wellington, including the first stage of a Bachelor of Commerce and Administration.

==== Rise of students ====
CEO Mike Cooper announced in an interview with Upper Hutt newspaper "The Upper Hutt Leader" in 1995 the increase in students at the polytechnic. Since 1990, the average student age had risen from 19 to 31; females were now a majority, and Māori students had increased from 5 per cent to 14. The polytechnics roll had increased 26 per cent, while funding per student was down 23 per cent.

==== Introduction of a Wellington campus ====
The polytechnic announced on 30 August 1995 that they had leased 158 The Terrace to serve as their Wellington campus. The "CIT House" was on 26 October 1995 and ran the polytechnics computer science and business courses. It was later reported that these computer courses were being used over the Internet for staff training and personal development by NASA's Jet Propulsion laboratory and Portsmouth Naval Base in Virginia.

In 1996, bachelor's degrees in business information, tertiary teaching, tourism and services management were introduced.

==== Proposed mergers with other polytechnics ====
A merger between the Auckland Institute of Technology and Auckland College of Education was proposed on 27 November 1996. The merger would unify the courses and structure across the three polytechnics. CEO Mike Cooper however unexpectedly announced his resignation, leaving Trevor Boyle as acting CEO until the outcome of the merger was known. The merger was later abandoned in late 1998.

Another proposed merger was in talks with Waikato Polytechnic and was scheduled to be complete by 1 May 1998. A 'measure of agreement' was reached and on 1 July 1998 an article appeared stating the benefits of the merger. The polytechnic offered 11 degree courses at this time, and had campuses across the country, including Auckland, Hamilton, Wellington along with the main campus in Heretaunga, Upper Hutt. CIT later withdrew from this merger as a conclusion could not be met.

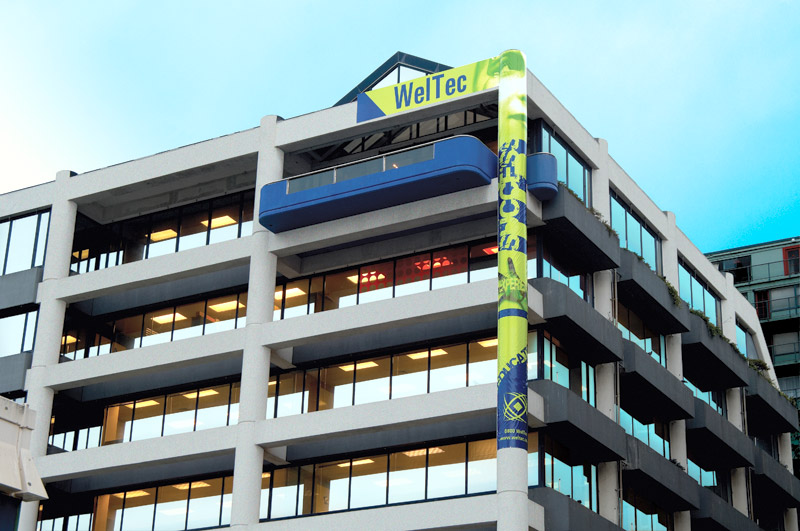
The Church St campus, which closed in 2017, as seen in 2008.

=== Merge of Hutt Valley Polytechnic and the Central Institute of Technology (2000–2010) ===
In 2000, a merger between Hutt Valley Polytechnic and the Central Institute of Technology was announced. The merger would see courses from both occurring at the Petone campus as most students lived closer to this campus. The agreed name of the merged polytechnic was the Wellington Institute of Technology. The Hutt Valley Polytechnic announced the closure of the Heretaunga campus on 18 April 2001. The reasoning for this was due to the decline in students at the Heretaunga campus. Courses ceased at the end of the first trimester in June 2001. Other tertiary providers did take up some of the CIT's courses; including the Auckland Institute of Technology taking up podiatry, and the University of Otago taking up dentistry. The Heretaunga campus was considered by a range of tenants, however was eventually sold to an investment group, who leased the building out to Aurora44, developers of video game Ashen.

In 2005, WelTec opened their Church St campus in a previous PricewaterhouseCoopers building, built in 1988.

=== Attempted merger with Whitireia Community Polytechnic (2011–2019) ===
On 23 November 2011, the merger of both WelTec and Whitireia Community Polytechnic was approved by the Minister for Tertiary Education Steven Joyce. Each polytechnic would retain its individual branding and identity however operate under a shared council. The new council commenced on 1 January 2012.

Discussion regarding a merger of the branding and identity of the two polytechnics followed for years after the merger of the council. Added financial pressure to both polytechnics helped fuel this discussion. In 2018, the Minister for Education Chris Hipkins announced a NZD$65 million cash injection for struggling polytechnics including WelTec and Whitireia. As part of this cash injection, a commissioner was issued to replace the combined council. In 2019, both WelTec and Whitireia announced 55 full-time equivalent jobs would be cut by the end of the year.

=== Merger into Te Pūkenga (2020–present) ===
On 1 April 2020, WelTec was subsumed into Te Pūkenga (New Zealand Institute of Skills & Technology) alongside 15 other national Institutes of Technology and Polytechnics (ITPs). The polytechnics will be considered subsidiaries of NZIST until the end of December 2022. The same day as the subsumption, Mark Oldershaw replaced Chris Gosling as CEO of both WelTec and Whitireia.

In mid-July 2025, the Vocational Education Minister Penny Simmonds announced that WelTec along with NorthTec, Western Institute of Technology at Taranaki (WITT), Whitireia New Zealand, and Tai Poutini Polytechnic (TPP) would temporarily remain with Te Pūkenga until final decisions were made in early 2026. On 16 July, WelTec & Whitireia confirmed that they would shut down their central Wellington creativity campus on 65 Dixon Street in late July 2025.

On 1 January 2026, it was confirmed that the combined WelTec & Whitireia would remain part of Te Pukenga until 1 January 2027.

== Campuses and facilities ==
=== Campuses ===
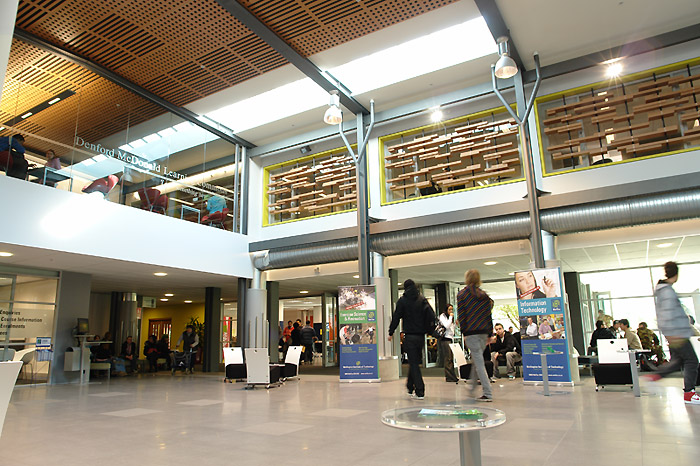
Petone "Student Hub" viewed from the campus entrance.

==== Petone ====
Petone is the main campus located on Kensington Ave. in Lower Hutt and includes the main administration departments, a learning commons with library, the Student Hub, and several blocks which serve different functions.

==== Wellington ====
The Wellington CBD campus is located on Dixon Street in the Wellington CBD. It is shared with Whitireia as part of their strategic partnership and the Wellington ICT Graduate School. The campus focuses on their business offerings. The campus was previously located on Church St in Wellington until 2017.

==== Wellington School of Construction ====
The Wellington School of Construction campus is located on State Highway 2 next to the Petone railway station. The campus was opened in 2015 and focuses on carpentry, painting and applied decorating. The campus covers 9,614m^{2} and therefore gives space for students to work on up to six houses.

==== Wellington School of Hospitality ====
The Wellington School of Hospitality campus is located on Cuba Street in the Wellington CBD. It was opened in 2015 and cost $11 million to build. The campus focusses of WelTec's hospitality offerings and has its own learning commons area, along with training restaurant Bistro 52 and training café Latte Lab, which are both open to the public.

==== Auckland ====
WelTec operated an Auckland campus, which was located on Queen Street in the Auckland CBD. It focused on social services including addictions and youth development,

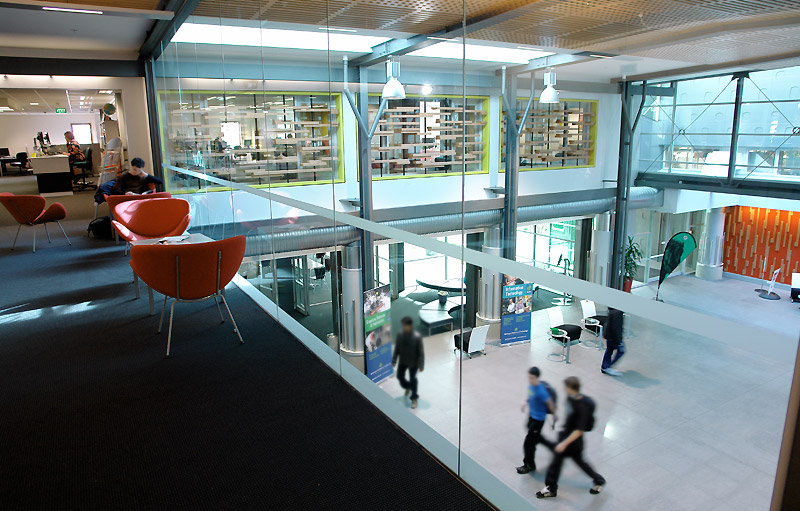
Petone "Student Hub" viewed from the learning commons.

=== Facilities ===
==== Cafes and restaurants ====
WelTec offers cafes and restaurants on most campuses. A cafeteria is available on the Petone campus for staff and students, while training restaurant Bistro 52 and café Latte Lab are available to the public at the Cuba St campus.

==== Childcare ====
WelTec offers an early childcare centre called Te Whare Ako. Parents can utilize this service while studying at the campus.

==== Free bus ====
In conjunction with Whitireia, WelTec runs a free bus service between the Petone and the Whitireia campus located in Porirua. The bus runs during weekdays and is free for staff and students.

==== Hair and beauty salons ====
WelTec offers professional salons where students can learn on public clients. These usually operate in the second trimester (June to October). Salons are available at both the Petone and Cuba St campuses.

==== Prayer rooms ====
WelTec offers prayer rooms at two of their campus: Petone and Cuba St. Students and staff can utilize these to pray in a safe and quiet environment.

==== Learning commons ====
WelTec has three learning commons spaces on the Auckland, Petone and Wellington Cuba Street campuses. Students can utilize these to complete assignments using provided IT services, get help from support staff and access other WelTec services and resources.

== Controversies ==
=== Podiatry course relocation ===
In 2001, 25 podiatry students sued WelTec for up to $350,000 to cover costs after their course was moved to Auckland. Many students had begun the course at the Upper Hutt CIT campus and were told they would have to move to Auckland University of Technology to complete the course.
