= Whitireia New Zealand =

Education institute in New Zealand

Coordinates: 41°7′33.76″S 174°50′17″E

- Te Kura Matatini o Whitireia
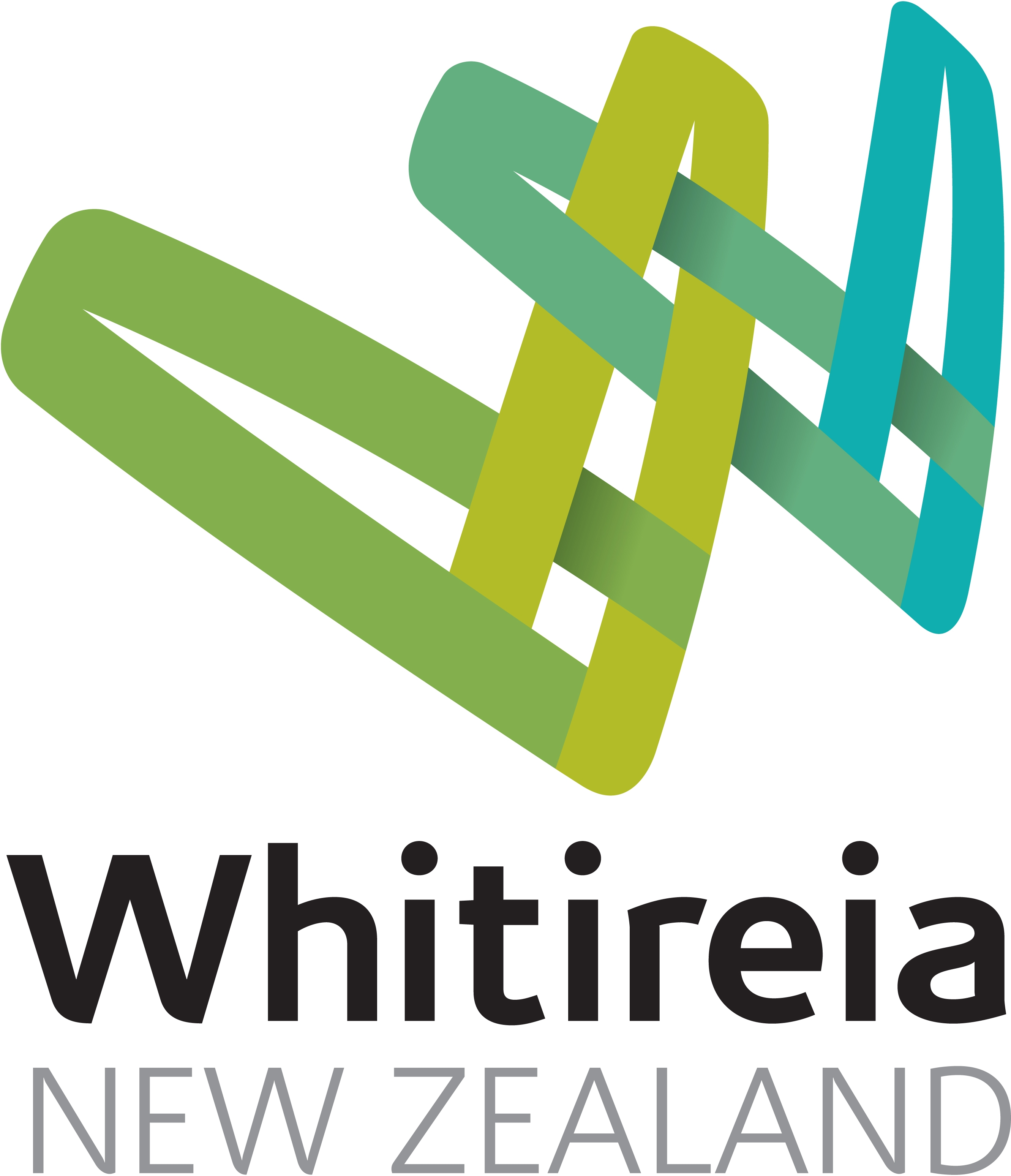
- Former names: Parumoana Community College; Whitireia Community Polytechnic
- Motto: Leading and Illuminating
- Established: 1986
- Affiliations: TEI
- Faculty: 302 FTE in 2020 (together with WelTec)
- Students: 7,703 in 2022 (together with WelTec
- Location: Wi Neera Drive, Takapuwahia, Porirua, New Zealand, Porirua, New Zealand
- Website: Official website

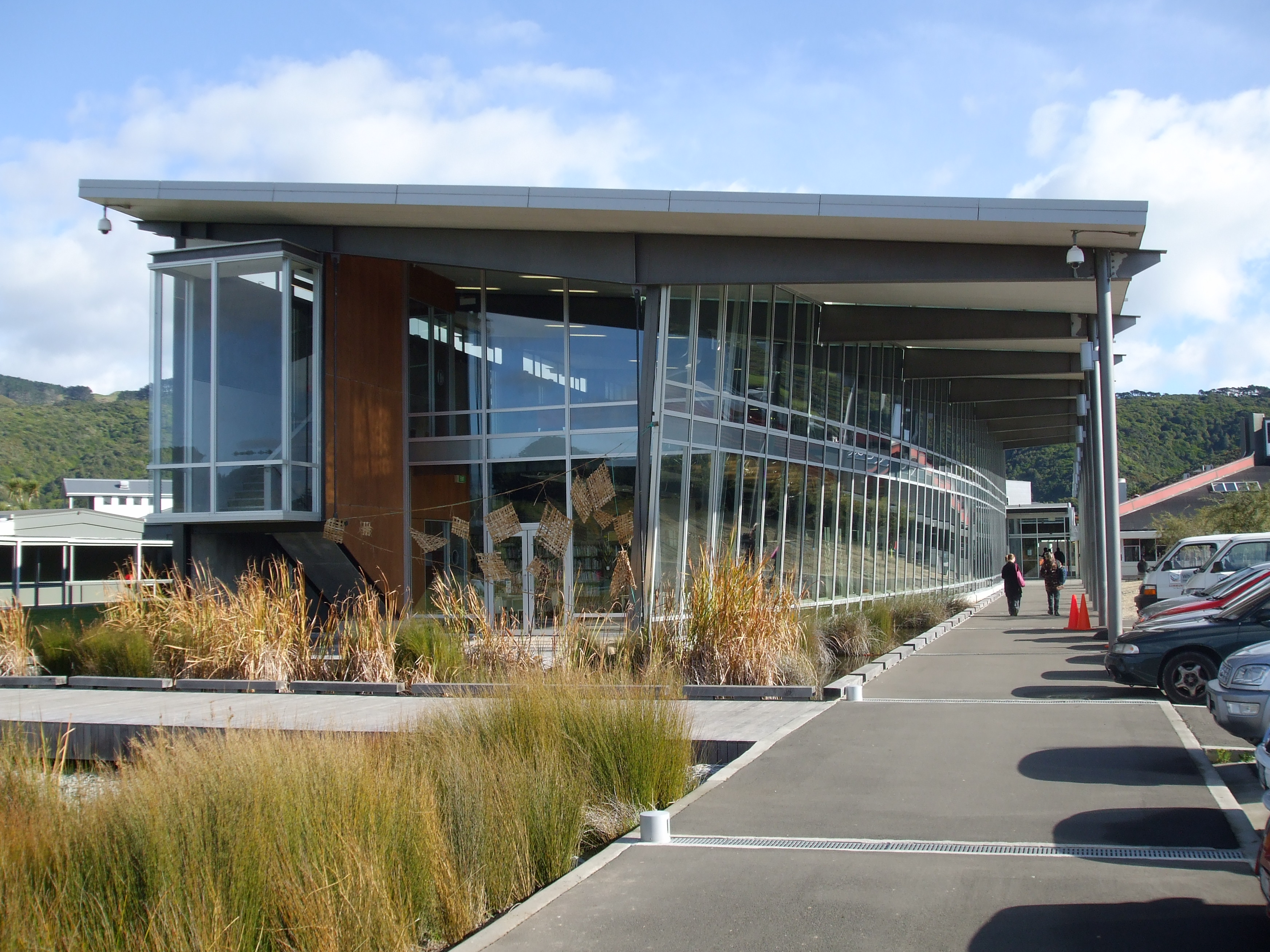
Te Kete Wānanga, Porirua Campus

Whitireia New Zealand, previously called Whitireia Community Polytechnic and Parumoana Community College (Māori: Te Kura Matatini o Whitireia) is a subsidiary of Te Pūkenga – New Zealand Institute of Skills and Technology, a government-owned and funded vocational education provider in New Zealand. Whitireia was established as an independent tertiary education institute in 1986 on the shores of Porirua Harbour. Since 2015 it has shared its leadership council and chief executive with WelTec (Wellington Institute of Technology). In 2020 it became a subsidiary of Te Pūkenga following a merger with 15 other New Zealand tertiary education institutes. As of 2022, Whitireia and WelTec share 7,700 students, with campuses in Wellington, Petone and Porirua.

== History ==
Whitireia was founded in 1986 in Porirua and was originally named Parumoana Community College. It was renamed Whitireia Community Polytechnic in 1989 and Whitireia New Zealand in 2010. It then partnered with WelTec, with the two organisations sharing a combined council. After running into financial difficulties, Whitireia was bailed out by the government with a NZ$15 million grant in 2018. Shortly afterwards, the combined board was sacked and replaced with a commissioner.

Whitireia, alongside all other Institutes of Technology and Polytechnics (ITPs) in New Zealand, was subsumed into Te Pūkenga (New Zealand Institute of Skills and Technology) on 1 April 2020.

In mid-July 2025, the Vocational Education Minister Penny Simmonds announced that Whitireia along with NorthTec, Western Institute of Technology at Taranaki (WITT), the Wellington Institute of Technology (WelTec) and Tai Poutini Polytechnic (TPP) would temporarily remain with Te Pūkenga until final decisions were made in early 2026. On 16 July, Whitireia & WelTec confirmed that they would shut down their central Wellington creativity campus on 65 Dixon Street in late July 2025.

On 1 January 2026, it was confirmed that Whitireia/WelTec would remain part of Te Pukenga until 1 January 2027.

== Management ==
Dr Tūroa Royal was the foundation principal and CEO of Whitireia Community Polytechnic from 1986 to 1996. He was succeeded by his deputy, Deirdre Dale, from 1996 to 2006. From 2006 to 2015, Don Campbell was CEO. When Chris Gosling, the current CEO, took over from Campbell in 2015, this was a combined role as chief executive for both Whitireia and WelTec.

Mark Oldershaw took over as chief executive from Gosling on 1 April 2020. The date coincided with Whitireia being subsumed into Te Pūkenga.

== Campuses ==
Whitireia operates five campuses in the North Island.

Campus locations:

- Porirua Campus, Wi Neera Drive, Porirua
- Te Kahui Auaha 65 Dixon Street Te Aro Wellington
- Hospitality 52 Cuba Street Te Aro Wellington
- Petone (Weltec) 21 Kensington Avenue Petone
- Auckland Campus, Queen Street, Auckland
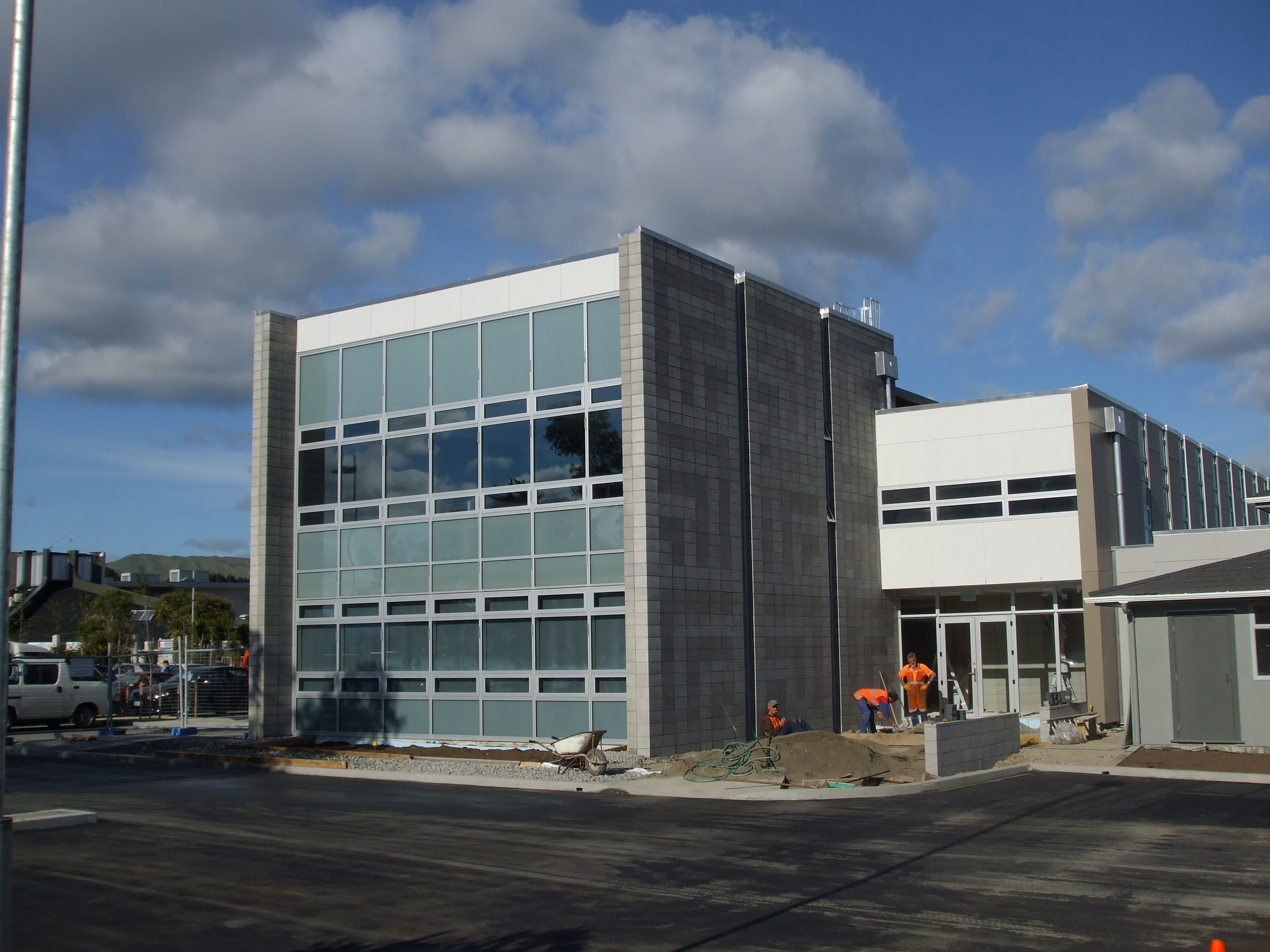
Wikitoria Katene, Porirua Campus

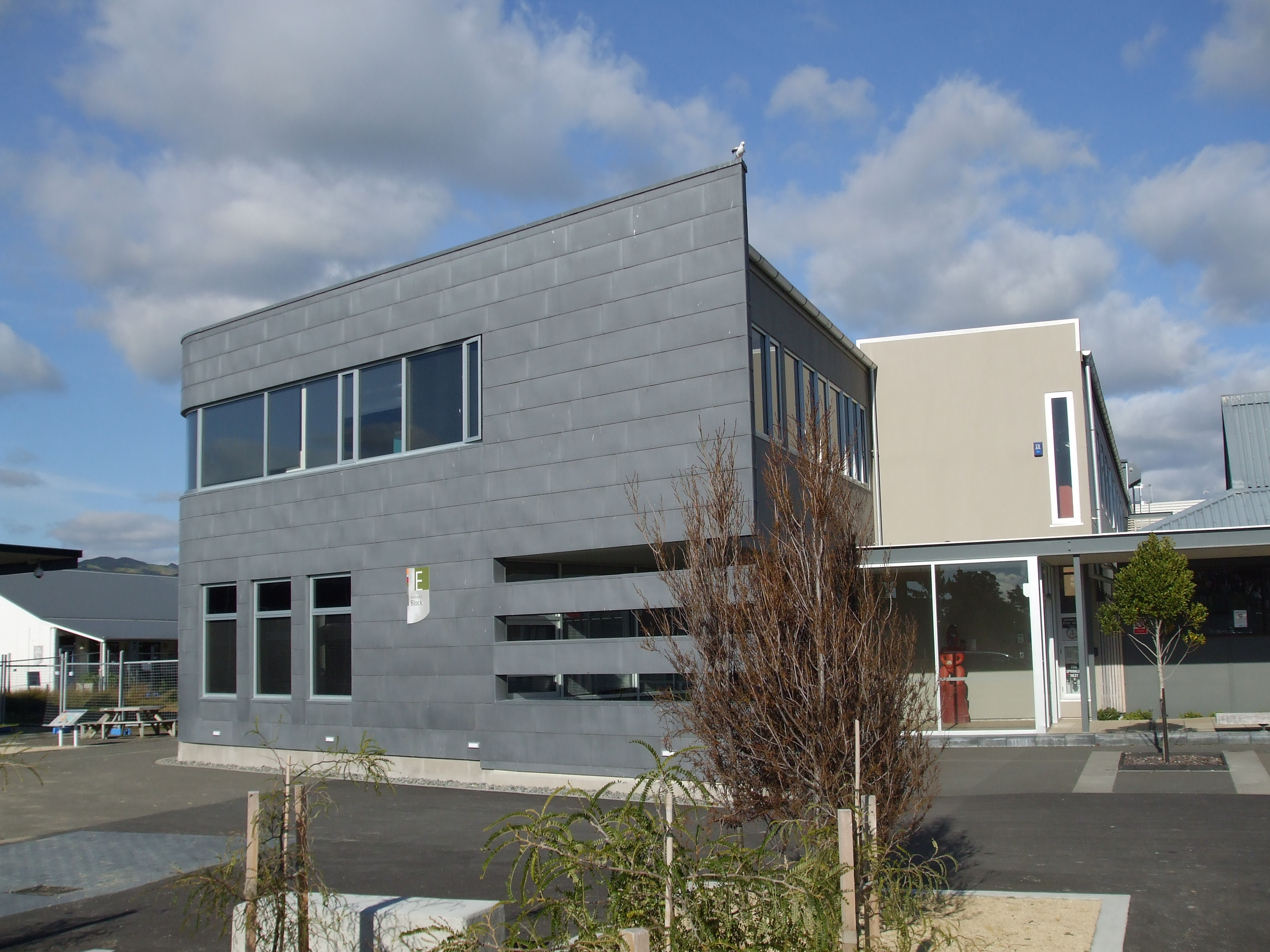
E-Block, Porirua Campus

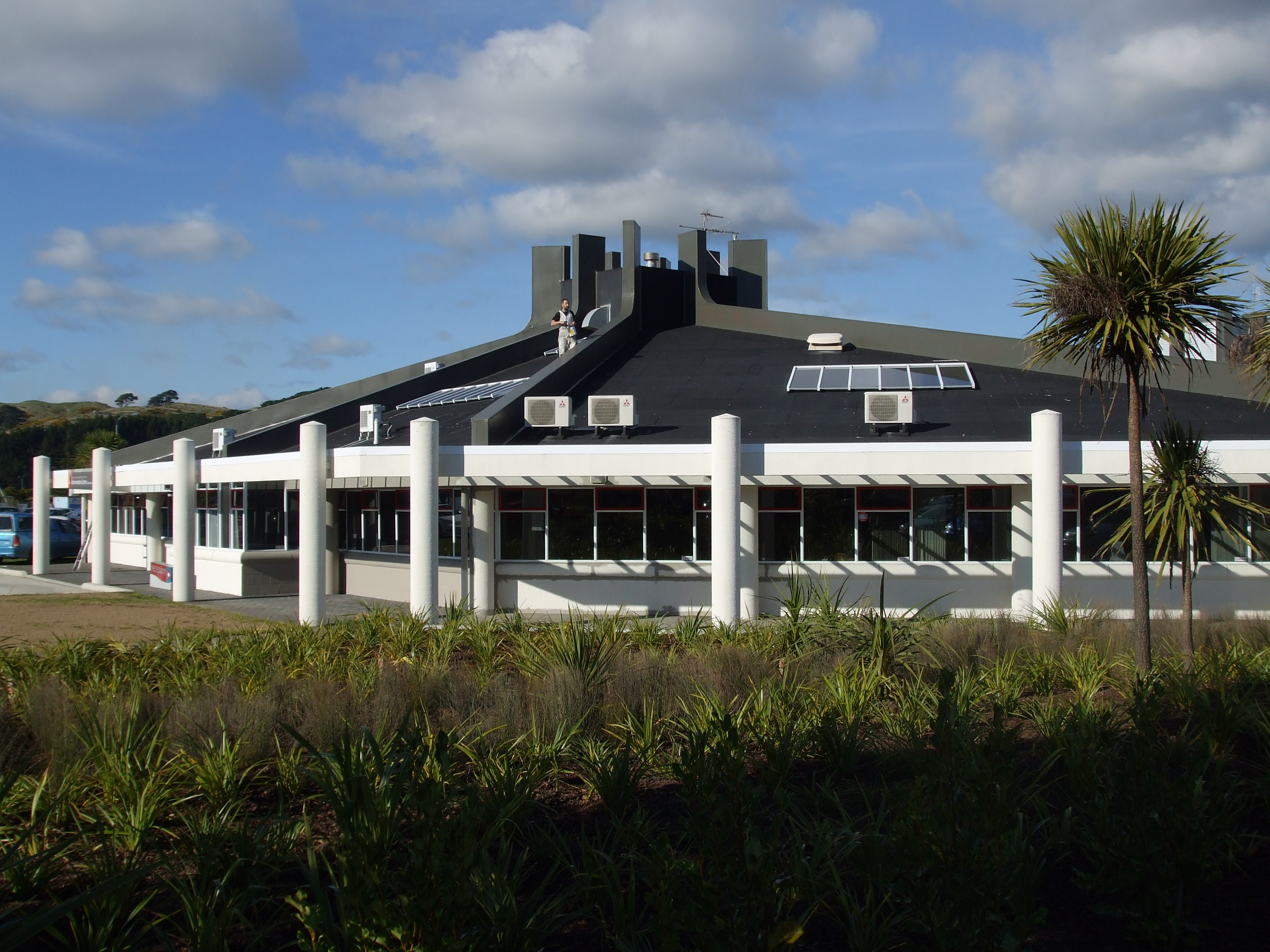
A-Block, Porirua Campus

Te Onepu, Porirua Campus

== Schools ==
- School of Creativity and Hospitality
- School of Business and Information Technology
- School of Health and Social Services
- School of Learner Journey
- School of Te Wānanga Māori
- School of Construction and Engineering
