= Penny Simmonds =

New Zealand politician (born 1959)

The Honourable Penny Simmonds CNZM MP
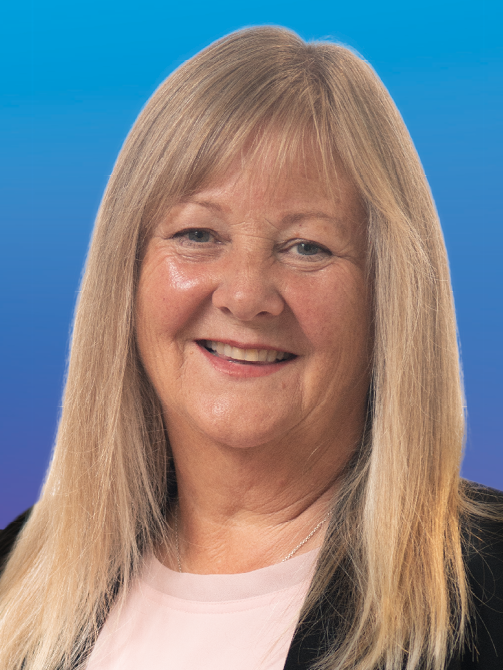
- Official portrait, 2023

Member of the New Zealand Parliament for Invercargill
- Incumbent
- Assumed office 17 October 2020
- Preceded by: Sarah Dowie
- Majority: 10,945

Minister for Tertiary Education
- Incumbent
- Assumed office 7 April 2026
- Prime Minister: Christopher Luxon
- Preceded by: Steven Joyce

29th Minister of Science, Innovation and Technology
- Incumbent
- Assumed office 7 April 2026
- Prime Minister: Christopher Luxon
- Preceded by: Shane Reti

17th Minister for the Environment
- In office 27 November 2023 – 7 April 2026
- Prime Minister: Christopher Luxon
- Preceded by: David Parker
- Succeeded by: Nicola Grigg

Personal details
- Born: September 1959 (age 67) Southland, New Zealand
- Party: National
- Spouse: Marty Irwin
- Children: 3
- Education: University of Otago

Penelope Elsie Simmonds CNZM MP (born September 1959) is a New Zealand politician, Member of Parliament and a Minister in the House of Representatives for the National Party. She previously served as the chief executive of the Southern Institute of Technology. Following the 2023 New Zealand general election, Simmonds assumed the disability issues, environmental, tertiary education and skills, and associate social development and employment portfolios in the Sixth National Government. In April 2026, Simmonds joined the New Zealand Cabinet and gained the tertiary education and science, innovation and technology portfolios.

== Early life and career ==
Simmonds was born in Southland and grew up in Riversdale and Te Tipua. She attended Gore High School and received a Bachelor of Science from the University of Otago. She served in the New Zealand Territorial Force for several years.

Simmonds was the chief executive of the Southern Institute of Technology (SIT) from 1997 to October 2020. During this time she implemented SIT's Zero Fees Scheme. She took leave from 29 June 2020 in order to focus on her political campaign, with deputy chief executive Maree Howden acting in her place. Upon her election to parliament she resigned her position with SIT.

Simmonds has had a close working relationship with Invercargill Mayor Tim Shadbolt, as evidenced by him consulting with her during the 2010 Invercargill mayoral election. Shadbolt attended her 2020 election night party, for which he received criticism from city councillor and former Labour MP Lesley Soper for listing it as an official mayoral engagement.

She has been a director of the Southland Museum and Art Gallery and a board member of the Southland District Health Board.

== Political career ==
New Zealand Parliament
Years	Term	Electorate	List	Party
2020–2023	53rd	Invercargill	63	National
2023–2026	54th	Invercargill	16	National
2026–present	55th	Invercargill	14	National

=== 2020 general election ===
Simmonds was selected as the National Party candidate for Invercargill in May 2020 following Sarah Dowie's decision to retire. Dowie had originally been selected to run again in September 2019. Simmonds had been rumoured as a potential candidate for about fifteen years prior.

Key points of Simmonds' campaign were opposing the merging of New Zealand's polytechnics and keeping the Tiwai Point Aluminium Smelter open. During the brief National Party leadership of Todd Muller, Simmonds felt so frustrated at the lack of communication that she began instead talking to Botany candidate Christopher Luxon, seen as a potential future party leader.

=== First term, 2020–2023 ===
Simmonds defeated Labour list MP Liz Craig in the 2020 election, retaining the Invercargill seat for National by a margin of 224 votes.

In mid-November 2021, Simmonds joined her party in expressing opposition to the Labour Government's COVID-19 Protection Framework ("traffic light system"), which she described as "confusing." She also voted against the Government's COVID-19 Response (Vaccinations) Legislation Act 2021, claiming that the vaccine mandate would hurt businesses and the disabled.

Simmonds also opposed the Contraception, Sterilisation, and Abortion (Safe Areas) Amendment Act 2022, which established "safe zones" around abortion providers. The bill passed its third reading on 16 March 2022.

In response to a leaked report obtained by Radio New Zealand in May 2022 which identified several financial and capacity problems with the merger of the various polytechnics and industrial training organisations into the new mega polytechnic network Te Pūkenga, Simmonds in her capacity as National's tertiary education spokesperson urged the Government to abandon its polytechnic merger plans and instead invest more money into struggling institutions. Following reports of inadequate leadership, low enrolments, and a NZ$110 million deficit at Te Pūkenga, Simmonds questioned the viability of the new educational provider. She also criticised the creation of 180 administrative jobs at Te Pūkenga's Hamilton headquarters in the light of 600 projected redundancies resulting from the polytechnic merger process. Simmonds also claimed that Te Pūkenga's CEO Stephen Town's departure on "special leave" signalled significant problems with the new education provider. In mid-August 2022, Simmonds alleged that Town had been "shoulder-tapped" for the position of CEO of Te Pūkenga and lodged an Official Information Act request to identify the person who recommended Town for the executive job.

On 19 January 2023, Simmonds became the National Party's Workforce Planning spokesperson during a reshuffle of Party leader Christopher Luxon's shadow cabinet.

=== Second term, 2023–present ===
During the 2023 New Zealand general election, Simmonds retained the Invercargill seat by a margin of 10,945 votes, defeating Labour's candidate Liz Craig.

Following the formation of the National-led coalition government in late November 2023, Simmonds was appointed as Minister for Disability Issues, Minister for the Environment, Minister for Tertiary Education and Skills, and Associate Minister for Social Development and Employment.

Following a cabinet reshuffle in early April 2026, Simmonds joined the New Zealand Cabinet and gained the tertiary education and science, innovation and technology portfolios.

==== Disability issues ====
On 19 March 2024, the Ministry for Disabled People abruptly announced that it would remove respite care funding in families with disabled children. As Disability Issues Minister, Simmonds announced the funding would run out within days. According to Stuff, Simmonds was first aware of funding issues back in December 2023. She said the Government was not going to increase funding to maintain support for disabled people and their families because "the Government's coffers are not an endless open pit". On 20 March, Simmonds said the Ministry had done an inadequate job in conveying changes to disabled people's funding. She also questioned how the money has been spent, and suggested some families were wasting their funding on “massages, overseas travel and pedicures”. The changes have caused widespread anguish within the disabled community and a petition opposing the changes has attracted more than 10,000 signatures in 24 hours. That same day, Finance Minister Nicola Willis called Disabilities officials and Simmonds in for an urgent briefing, after families were blindsided by news of cuts to respite care. Willis advised that news came as a surprise, and that she was unaware about how dire the situation was before news broke.

On 24 April 2024, Simmonds was stripped of her Disability Issues portfolio by Prime Minister Christopher Luxon due to criticism of her handling of changes to Government disability funding policies. She was replaced as Disability Issues Minister by Minister for Social Development Louise Upston, whose Ministry has oversight over the Ministry for Disabled People.

==== Tertiary education ====
In early December 2023 Simmonds, in her capacity as Tertiary Education Minister, confirmed that the Government would be dissolving the mega polytechnic Te Pūkenga and replacing it with eight to ten institutions. she stated that the Government would no longer centralise vocational training and education and that the polytechnics would regain their autonomy. Simmonds also said that the Government would introduce legislation entrenching the dissolution of Te Pūkenga into law over the next six to eight months. Simmonds has aimed for this revamp of the tertiary and vocational sector to be completed by 1 January 2025. While the Tertiary Education Union (TEU) national secretary Sandra Grey expressed concern that the dissolution of Te Pūkenga would undermine staff morale and foster unnecessary competition within the polytechnic sector, former Otago Polytechnic CEO Phil Kerr welcomed the re-establishment of autonomous polytechnics.

On 19 December 2024, Simmonds and Associate Education Minister David Seymour announced that the Government would amend the Education and Training Act 2020 to strengthen universities' free speech obligations.

On 20 December, Simmonds confirmed that the Government would proceed with plans to dismantle Te Pūkenga in 2024 and would decide which polytechnics could be independent by 2026 or would join a national federation of polytechnics. Simmond also indicated that the Government was considering selling some polytechnics. She also confirmed that the Government would replace Workforce Development Councils with government-funded Industry Skills Boards as the regulatory bodies for different industries. In response, TEU national secretary Sandra Grey criticised the lack of detail in the government announcement while Civil Contractors New Zealand chief executive Allan Pollard expressed disappointment at the Government's plans to dissolve the Workforce Development Councils, saying that they allowed the industry to give input into the skills and training of workplace trainees.

On 19 May 2025, the Otago Daily Times reported that Simmonds would be introducing the Education and Training (Vocational Education and Training System) Amendment Bill to Parliament. This bill would facilitate the dissolution of mega polytechnic Te Pūkenga. In response, Tertiary Education Union general secretary Daniel Benson-Guiu expressed concern about the lack of detail in the proposed bill about which polytechnics would stand alone, which would merge and which would be federated.

On 14 July 2025, Simmonds confirmed that the Government would dissolve Te Pūkenga by 31 December 2026 and restore the autonomous status of 10 polytechnics by 1 January 2026. Five polytechnics NorthTec, the Western Institute of Technology at Taranaki, Whitireia, the Wellington Institute of Technology and Tai Poutini Polytechnic would remain part of Te Pūkenga until the Government released a decision about their financial viability in early 2026. In addition, The Open Polytechnic of New Zealand, Otago Polytechnic and the Universal College of Learning would become part of a new federation. She also said that the Government would establish a new system for industry work-based training.

On 1 January 2026, ten of Te Pukenga's constituent polytechnics and all work-based learning organisations exited the mega polytechnic to become independent entities again. In mid-February 2026, the Government allocated NZ$325 million to the ten newly independent polytechnics formed from the planned disestablishment of Te Pūkenga and NZ$62.7 million to the five Industry Skill Boards replacing the mega polytechnic's seven work-based training divisions. Simmonds said that these funds would cover the newly reconstituent organisations' spending expenditures for three months and ring-fenced funding they took with them prior to joining Te Pūkenga. The four remaining polytechnics affiliated with Te Pukenga–NorthTec, Tai Poutini Polytechnic, the Western Institute of Technology at Taranaki and Whitireia New Zealand & Wellington Institute of Technology are expected to exit the mega polytechnic on 1 January 2027. Te Pukenga is expected to continue operating until late 2026 or March 2027.

==== 2026 general election ====
During the 2026 New Zealand general election, Simmonds contested the Invercargill electorate for National. She was ranked 14th on the National Party list. Based on preliminary results, Simmonds retained Invercargill by a comfortable margin of 9,615 votes.

== Personal life ==
Simmonds is married with three daughters, the youngest of whom has Down's syndrome. She received a Woolf Fisher Fellowship in 2000, and was appointed a Companion of the New Zealand Order of Merit, for services to education, sport and the community, in the 2016 New Year Honours.

New Zealand Parliament
Preceded by Sarah Dowie	Member of Parliament for Invercargill; 2020–present	Incumbent
