= Otago Polytechnic =

Public New Zealand tertiary education institute

Coordinates: 45.865927°S 170.518522°E

- Te Kura Matatini ki Otago
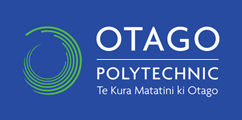
- Established: 1870 Dunedin School of Art, 1889 Dunedin Technical College, 1966 (Otago Polytechnic)
- Affiliations: Public Tertiary Education Institution
- Chief Executive: Andrew McSweeney
- Faculty: 759 full- and part-time staff (2018)
- Students: 6,835 EFTS (2024)
- Location: Forth St, Dunedin, Dunedin, New Zealand
- Campus: Dunedin, Auckland, Cromwell, Wānaka
- Website: www.op.ac.nz

Otago Polytechnic is a public New Zealand tertiary education institute, centred in Dunedin with additional campuses in Cromwell and Auckland. It provides career-focused education and training, offering a range of New Zealand-accredited postgraduate qualifications, degrees, diplomas and certificates at levels 2–10.

From 1 November 2022 until 31 December 2025, it operated as a business unit of Te Pūkenga (the New Zealand Institute of Skills and Technology). From 1 January 2026, Otago Polytechnic became a standalone organisation, delivering all programmes and training directly.

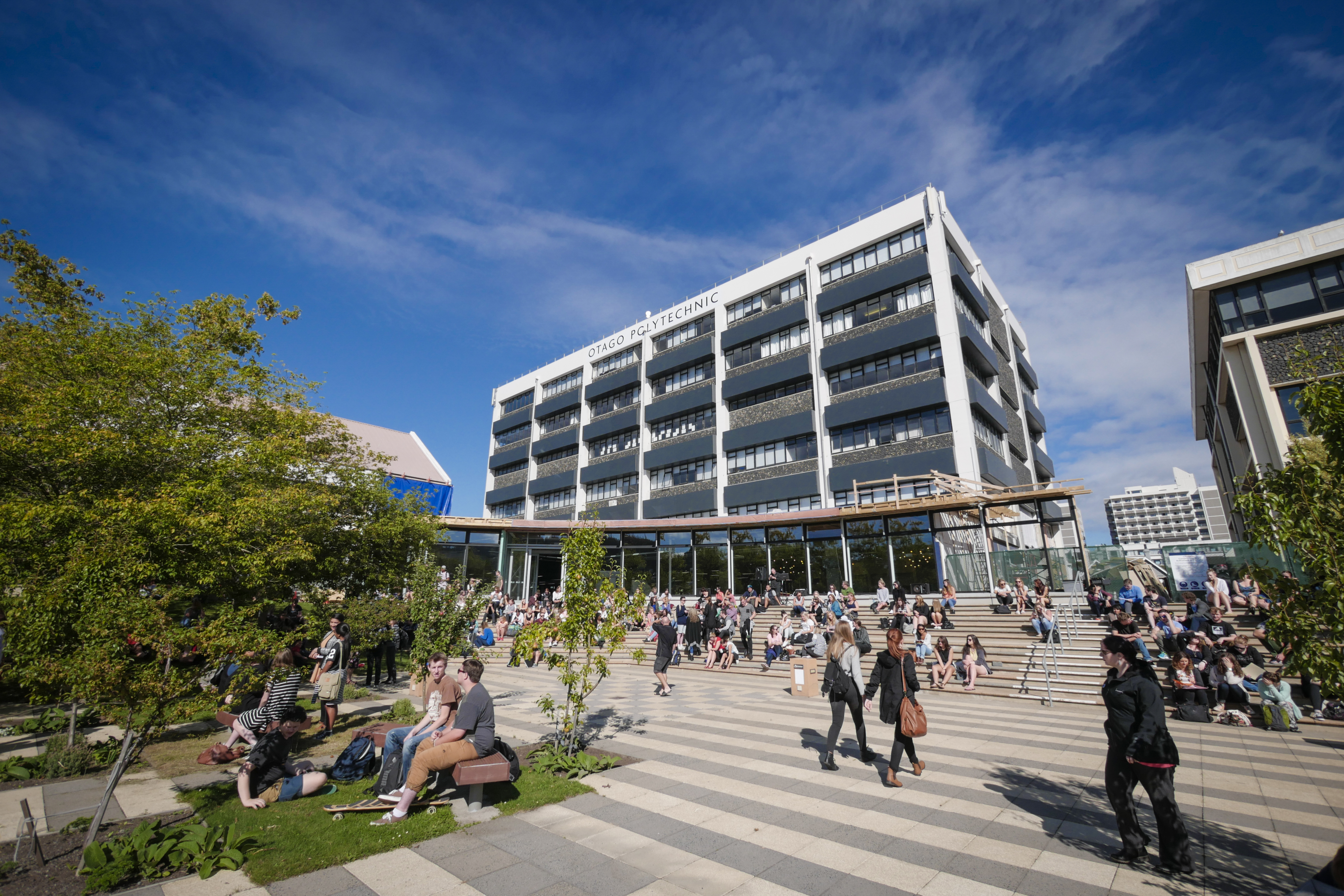
H Block of the Forth Street Campus

== History ==
=== Origins ===
==== Dunedin School of Art ====
Otago Polytechnic traces its ancestry back to 1870, when the Dunedin School of Art was established as New Zealand's first dedicated art school. Founded by Scottish art teacher David Hutton, who arrived in Port Chalmers that year equipped with plaster casts of classical sculptures, the school opened in February and became the oldest teaching department within the polytechnic sector. It quickly gained prominence, producing influential artists such as Frances Hodgkins and Colin McCahon.

Hutton was given two rooms in the former Post Office Building (now the current site of John Wickliffe House along Princes Street in Dunedin), and then a set of rooms in a newly completed school building administered by the former New Zealand Department of Education along Moray Pl in Dunedin.

When Hutton retired in 1908, the Otago Education Board wanted to transfer the art school to the technical school, but his successor, Robert Hawcridge, refused. Art classes were suspended after Hawcridge died suddenly in 1919.

==== Dunedin Technical School ====
The idea for a technical school came from George Thomson, a science teacher at Otago Boys' High School, who called a meeting in the Dunedin Town Hall on 16 October 1888 to discuss evening classes for young workers. A public meeting on 15 November 1888 formed the Technical Classes Association.

In 1889, the Dunedin Technical School opened to complement the art school's offerings, initially providing evening classes in subjects including English, Latin, literature, chemistry, mathematics, shorthand, and woodwork. These programs, organized by the Dunedin Technical Classes Association and housed alongside the Dunedin School of Art, targeted young men seeking further education amid the needs of early settler communities, and keep them off the streets.

The school opened on 1 May 1889 with 288 students from 55 occupations. Its teachers were unpaid and included Thomson and the Presbyterian minister Rutherford Waddell. It moved to the former Vulcan Foundry on the corner of Union and Great King streets in 1893, and in 1897 to a former brass foundry in Moray Place. At the end of 1902, the Otago Education Board took over the association's assets at the association's request, and a board of managers was set up with members from the association, the education board and the Dunedin City Council.

By 1909, the institution expanded to include technical classes specifically for secondary school pupils, broadening access to vocational training. Hutton taught evening classes in painting, clay modelling and freehand, geometric, mechanical and architectural drawing. The secondary classes formed a technical high school, which gave pupils a general education with a technical, commercial or domestic bias.

In 1914 the Dunedin Technical School relocated to the current site along Stuart Street, and was renamed to the King Edward Technical College, after the late British monarch, King Edward VII. The board of managers had decided in 1910 to build on the former Middle District School playground in Tennyson Street, with a frontage on Stuart Street. The building was officially opened in September 1914, and within a year it was free of debt, with Dunedin residents donating more than 40 per cent of the cost. Burt Hall, named after the foundry owner and long-serving board member Alexander Burt, was added in 1918, and the Thomson Wing, named after George Thomson, in 1923.

In 1920 the college took over the Dunedin School of Art. The art school moved into the college's Stuart Street building in 1924, and into a purpose-built building on the corner of Tennyson Street and York Place in 1937. The college expanded further by taking on the evening and daytime education of apprentices, technicians and professionals.

The roll grew after the government abolished the Proficiency examination in 1936 and raised the school leaving age to 15 in 1944. Following a 1944 commission of enquiry into apprenticeships, trades could make part-time study compulsory for their apprentices, and from the 1950s the college also trained technicians for New Zealand Certificates. By 1965, King Edward Technical College had a technical high school of 1,000 day pupils and a tertiary division of more than 2,500 students. Only about 70 of the tertiary students studied full-time.

==== Establishment of Otago Polytechnic ====
From 1960, the government split the large city technical colleges, each into a secondary school and a separate technical institute. At King Edward Technical College the tertiary courses were renamed the "King Edward Technical College polytechnic division" in 1963, and in 1964 the name "Otago Polytechnic" was chosen for the new institution. The college principal, Ian Scollay, had suggested the name. He had previously been principal of Singapore Polytechnic.

Otago Polytechnic was officially opened at the King Edward Technical College building on the 1 February 1966. Both the technical school and the new polytechnic shared the same Technical College building, but would eventually relocate to new sites. In 1974, the King Edward Technical College became the current Logan Park High School, and by 1980, Otago Polytechnic was looking into a new location.

=== Early years (1966–1989) ===
The polytechnic and King Edward Technical High School began as separate institutions, each with its own principal and governing body, but they shared the Stuart Street buildings. The polytechnic took the upper part of the site, and the art school moved into two houses in Cargill Street.

The first polytechnic council took office on 1 August 1966. Its members represented professional bodies, employers, unions, the Dunedin City Council and the University of Otago, and they were unpaid. An elected staff member and an elected student became full council members in 1976. The Department of Education still made most policy and spending decisions and approved all courses. Ian Scollay was the first principal. Ill health forced him to retire in 1974, and his deputy Ted Aitchison replaced him. Ian Hall followed Aitchison in 1985.

Otago and Auckland Technical Institute were the first institutions in New Zealand to offer tertiary catering courses, Otago starting with a part-time cookery course in 1966. In 1977, the catering school opened its training restaurant to the public, despite objections from eight city restaurants. It was named after Joseph William Mellor, a former pupil of the technical school who became a fellow of the Royal Society. Ladies' hairdressing courses began in 1969, and in 1985 the polytechnic started New Zealand's first full-time polytechnic tourism course. Scollay had set up a nautical department at Singapore Polytechnic, and Otago began marine and fishing courses in 1968. A former fisheries patrol boat, Clematis, was given to the polytechnic as a training vessel in 1975, but fishing cadet training stopped two years later.

Under a government policy of moving health training from hospital boards to polytechnics, the Otago Hospital Board's New Zealand School of Physiotherapy was transferred to the polytechnic in 1976. Teaching continued in the hospital board's Hanover Street building. The first three-year comprehensive nursing course began in 1984 with 48 students, and a one-year diploma in midwifery was added in 1989.

The art school extended its two-year diploma in fine arts to three years and later added an honours year. In 1973 it started New Zealand's first full-time ceramics course, and a craft design course followed in 1986. The polytechnic bought its first computer in 1982. In 1987, it introduced the National Certificate in Business Studies, which polytechnics around the country later adopted.

From 1978, the polytechnic ran courses for unemployed young people for the Department of Labour, and then a series of government training schemes. By 1986 this work made up more than 20 per cent of its teaching. A Māori and Polynesian Studies Centre opened in a house on Cargill Street in 1984. The following year it was split into separate Māori and Pacific Island centres.

=== Move to Forth Street ===
In 1963 the technical college board planned to build the polytechnic on the block across Stuart Street, bounded by Cargill Street, Haddon Place and York Place. The Department of Education bought about two-thirds of the houses there. By late 1966, the high school wanted to move to a new site instead, and the polytechnic agreed to redevelop the existing Stuart Street site. In 1969 the government decided to move the high school to Pelichet Bay. A 1973 report on technical education by the Australian P. Edwards called some of the polytechnic's buildings "very depressing". The high school moved at the end of 1974 and was renamed Logan Park High School, and the polytechnic took over the whole Stuart Street site.

The redevelopment was delayed again. In 1978, the Department of Education proposed moving the polytechnic to a block bounded by Forth Street, St David Street, Harbour Terrace and Union Street, next to the Dunedin Teachers College, which had surplus space. The Treasury considered redeveloping Stuart Street too expensive. The polytechnic council agreed to the move in October 1978. In 1981, the council chairman, Geoff Mason, sent the Minister of Education a telegram complaining of a 16-year delay in providing the buildings promised in 1966.

The Commerce Department moved first, in 1980, to the top floor of the teachers college tower block. In 1984, most of the art school moved to former teachers college buildings on the corner of Albany Street and Anzac Avenue. The artist Ralph Hotere, a former student of the art school, owned a cottage on the corner of Forth and St David streets and would not sell it, so a retaining wall was built between his property and the polytechnic site. A, D and E blocks opened in 1987, and F Block, the Geoff Mason Administration Building, in late 1988. H Block opened in 1989, when physiotherapy moved from Hanover Street. The teachers college library became a shared facility and reopened in 1989 as the Bill Robertson Library. Governor-General Paul Reeves formally opened the $20 million campus on 22 May 1989.

In 1989, 6,349 students enrolled at the polytechnic, 3,259 of them female.

=== Reforms and degrees (1990–2004) ===
The 1989–90 education reforms gave Otago Polytechnic a level of autonomy close to that of the universities. A new council was set up in 1990, and the principal became chief executive. The government now bulk-funded the polytechnic according to its number of equivalent full-time students. Ian Hall resigned in 1992 and was replaced by Nirwan Idrus, who was in turn replaced by Wanda Korndorffer in 1997. Polytechnics could now award degrees, but they also faced competition from private training establishments.

The polytechnic's first degree was a conjoint physiotherapy degree, taught with the University of Otago from 1991 and awarded by the university. The polytechnic withdrew in 1996 when physiotherapy training returned to the university, and 30 staff lost their jobs. In 1992, it converted its nursing diploma into a Bachelor of Nursing and introduced New Zealand's first midwifery degree. It added the country's first master's degrees in midwifery and nursing in 2000. Its first degree graduates were the nursing and midwifery students of 1994. Occupational therapy, which moved to Otago from the Central Institute of Technology in 1991, became a degree in 1995 and added a master's degree in 2002. A Bachelor of Fine Arts began in 1993 and a Master of Fine Arts in 1998. The art school also went back to its old name, the Dunedin School of Art. Later degrees included information technology in 1996, bought from Waikato Polytechnic, fashion and design in 2001, and hospitality and tourism management in 2004, based on a degree from Hong Kong Polytechnic University. From 1992, the polytechnic set aside money for research, and it published the journals Junctures and Scope.

In 1999 the polytechnic bought the Sports Institute of Otago, which had started at Taieri High School four years earlier, and moved it from Mosgiel to the former Dunedin Wool Exchange building on Union Street (S Block). Its early graduates included the All Black Carl Hayman. The same year the polytechnic set up the Centre for the Assessment of Prior Learning, which credited people's work and life experience towards formal qualifications. It ran free computer courses throughout Otago from 2000 until government funding cuts ended them in 2006. Plumbing, gasfitting and sheet metal engineering courses closed in 1993 for lack of students, and the marine and fishing courses also ended as other polytechnics took over that training. A dental hygiene course, started in 1995 at the request of the New Zealand Dental Association, was later transferred to the university.

In 1991 the polytechnic, the university and the college of education set up the Otago Language Centre for fee-paying overseas students. Control of the centre later passed to the university. In 2000, Otago joined Christchurch Polytechnic Institute of Technology, Manukau Institute of Technology and the Universal College of Learning in the Tertiary Accord of New Zealand, an alliance of polytechnics that had decided not to seek university status.

Building continued after 1989. A student centre shared with the college of education opened on Harbour Terrace in 1990. That year the students' association and the university also opened the Unipol recreation centre in a former warehouse on Anzac Avenue. G Block, for occupational therapy, opened in 1991. In 1992, a childcare centre (I Block) opened, and the polytechnic bought the former Rehabilitation League building on Anzac Avenue (L Block). This allowed it to leave the old Stuart Street building, which had housed technical education for 78 years.

From 1995 the polytechnic ran a mountain recreation course in Wānaka with Mount Aspiring College.

=== Campus redevelopment overrun (2001–2004) ===
In October 2001, the polytechnic announced it would close the Tennyson Street campus and move its remaining schools there to Forth Street by the end of 2002, in three stages costing $3.8 million. In May 2002, Korndorffer disclosed that the first stage was over budget. Its final cost was $4.215 million against a budget of $1.445 million. The council paid for the overrun from its own funds and went ahead with moving fashion and design, but shelved the move of hospitality and languages. Staff and students passed votes of no confidence in Korndorffer in June 2002. An Audit New Zealand review criticised the project's governance and procurement, including hiring the architect without a competitive process and deciding to engage contractors on a time-and-materials basis. Korndorffer resigned in December 2002, and the council chair, Shirley Jones, and deputy chair, Steven Rodgers, left the council soon after. Deputy chief executive Robin Day acted as chief executive for a year and a half until the council appointed Phil Ker of the Auckland University of Technology.

The polytechnic had recorded its first deficit in 1997. Facing another in 2003, it adopted a business recovery plan that cut 52 full-time-equivalent jobs, and it returned to a surplus of about $1 million in 2004.

=== 2005–2016 ===
In 2009, an annex containing the art school's first gallery opened beside P Block. A law change in 2010 reduced the council from 15 to eight members and ended direct staff and student representation on it. In 2013 the Institute of Sport and Adventure moved to the Sargood Centre at Logan Park, which it shares with Sport Otago.

When the University of Otago took over the Dunedin College of Education in 2007, the polytechnic transferred its half share of the Robertson Library to the university. A proposed joint Otago Institute of Design did not go ahead after the government withdrew its funding, saying the polytechnic would not accept a Crown manager for its finances. In 2008 the polytechnic transferred its hairdressing courses to Aoraki Polytechnic. It had proposed a merger with Telford Rural Polytechnic, which Telford rejected. In 2009 Otago and five other large institutes formed the Metro Group.

New qualifications included a bachelor's degree in product design in 2003, a master's degree in product design enterprise in 2006, a graduate diploma in physical conditioning in 2007 and a culinary arts degree in 2012. The polytechnic believed the last three to be the first of their kind in the world. The Central Otago campus began New Zealand's first tertiary stonemasonry course in 2005. The Centre for the Assessment of Prior Learning was renamed Capable NZ. In 2006, the polytechnic appointed its first professor, art school head Leoni Schmidt, and began competing for contestable research funding. It set up the Otago Polytechnic Education Foundation in 2014.

In 2015 the polytechnic had more than 7,200 students (4,333 equivalent full-time students) and 674 staff, and its revenue was just under $72 million.

=== Te Pūkenga ===
On 1 April 2020, the Minister of Education Chris Hipkins confirmed that Otago Polytechnic would be merged into New Zealand Institute of Skills & Technology (Te Pūkenga) alongside the 15 other Institutes of Technology and Polytechnics (ITPs). From that date, it operated as Otago Polytechnic Limited, a subsidiary of the new institute.

On 1 November 2022, Otago Polytechnic formally merged into Te Pūkenga, ending its existence as an independent entity. All its roles and structures were assumed by the new mega polytechnic.

On 13 September 2023, Prime Minister Hipkins opened a new trades and engineering school at Otago Polytechnic called He Toki Kai Te Rika. The Government had contributed NZ$28 million to the school's development as one of its "Shovel Ready" projects in 2020. The building was fully in use from the start of the first semester of 2024.

In July 2025, the Vocational Education Minister Penny Simmonds announced that Otago Polytechnic would leave Te Pūkenga and join a new federation of polytechnics consisting of The Open Polytechnic of New Zealand and the Universal College of Learning.

=== Return to independence ===
On 4 December 2025, Otago Polytechnic chief executive Megan Pōtiki resigned amid leadership restructuring associated with the organisation’s transition away from Te Pūkenga. In mid-December 2025, Andrew McSweeney was appointed as the Polytechnic’s new chief executive, assuming office in January 2026.

On 1 January 2026, Otago Polytechnic legally separated from Te Pūkenga and became a standalone organisation. All programmes, training, and student enrolments transferred automatically to Otago Polytechnic. The transition did not affect students’ study experiences, support services, or qualifications.

=== Financial challenges and restructuring (2024–2026) ===
During the transition period away from Te Pūkenga and in preparation for independence, Otago Polytechnic faced significant financial pressures that prompted internal restructuring and staffing changes. In 2025, the institution reported a financial deficit and developed a plan to make savings of more than NZ$10 million to improve viability, with the tertiary education regulator noting declining equivalent full‑time students and high personnel costs as contributing factors that could lead to further staff reductions.

In mid‑2025, the Polytechnic revealed that more than 20 staff were set to be made redundant as part of restructuring discussions, instigating tense meetings with affected employees and concerns among staff about morale.

In early 2025, Otago Polytechnic's Capable NZ division, a school that had historically delivered a range of professional and applied programmes, was proposed for major staff reductions after a significant fall in enrolments over several years. Management indicated that programme offerings would be reassigned within the Polytechnic under a new internal structure to address sustainability concerns.

These institutional challenges occurred against a backdrop of nationwide reform of vocational education: a Cabinet paper released in 2025 revealed that polytechnic restructuring across New Zealand was expected to result in reductions of hundreds of jobs and hundreds of programmes as providers prepared to operate independently of the former mega‑entity Te Pūkenga, under guidance from the Vocational Education Minister Penny Simmonds.

These financial and structural pressures were cited by Otago Polytechnic's leadership as part of the rationale for the institution's broader organisational changes leading up to its full separation from Te Pūkenga on 1 January 2026.

On 1 January 2026, Otago Polytechnic formally left Te Pukenga to become independent entity again. In mid-February 2026, the Government allocated over NZ$24 million to Otago Polytechnic to support its transition.

== Locations ==
Otago Polytechnic is spread over a large geographical area with campuses in Dunedin and Central Otago, as well as a campus for international students in Auckland. The Polytechnic also carries out distance-based learning in areas ranging from Veterinary Nursing to Midwifery, work-based and recognition of prior learning for mature students through Capable NZ and an online micro-credentialing service called EduBits.

=== Dunedin campuses ===
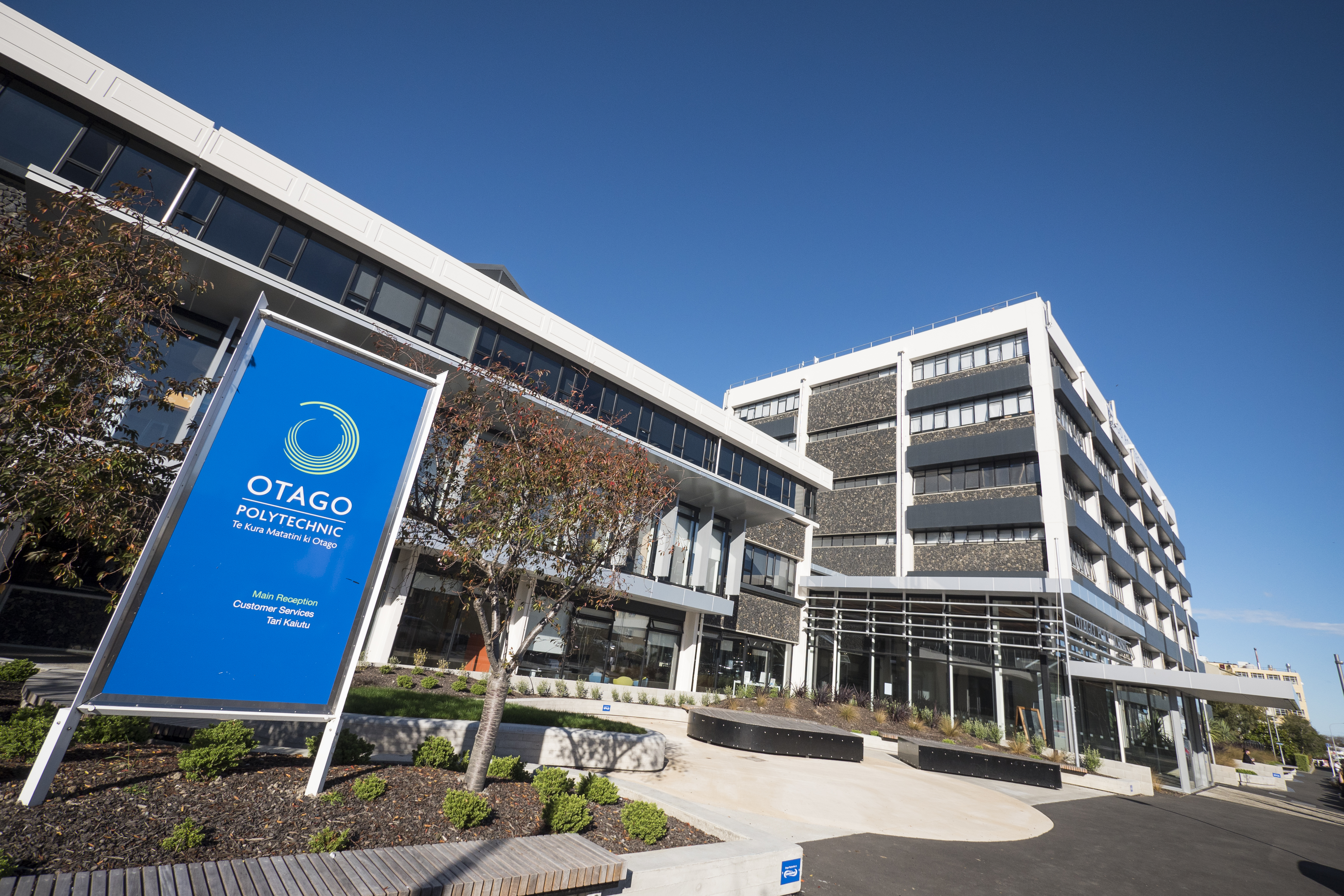
Dunedin campus

The Dunedin campus is situated on Forth Street, Union Street, Riego Street and Anzac Avenue in Dunedin North, and Cumberland Street in central Dunedin. The former Cumberland Street campus at 360 Cumberland Street was originally operated by Aoraki Polytechnic. Following Aoraki Polytechnic's merger with Christchurch Polytechnic Institute of Technology in 2016 to form Ara Institute of Canterbury, Otago Polytechnic took over Aoraki's Dunedin-based programmes and the Cumberland Street campus. The site was later acquired for the New Dunedin Hospital development, and the former campus has since been replaced by the hospital's outpatient building.

The Forth Street campus buildings are situated between the University of Otago campus and the Forsyth Barr Stadium, close to the edge of Logan Park. The Schools of Architecture, Building and Engineering and Natural Sciences are located on the old Rehabilitation League site on Anzac Avenue, and the Dunedin School of Art is located on Riego Street. Otago Polytechnic's library is the Robertson Library on Union Street, which it shares with the University of Otago College of Education.

In 2009, Otago Polytechnic vacated buildings and a large flat area used as a car park on Tennyson Street, close to Stuart Street in the central city. The buildings had previously housed the School of Hospitality, Languages and Fashion. In 2011 the Ministry of Education transferred this property to the Catholic Bishop of Dunedin to be added to the campus of Trinity Catholic College.

In 2014, a $12 million redevelopment of Otago Polytechnic's F and H Blocks began to transform the space into a contemporary learning environment and Hub. Mason and Wales were the architects for this project.

In 2016, Aoraki Polytechnic merged with Christchurch Polytechnic Institute of Technology to form Ara Institute of Canterbury, and Otago Polytechnic took over the teaching of Aoraki's Dunedin-based programmes. These included beauty therapy, hairdressing, early childhood education, journalism, photography, and film and television.

Technique Training Restaurant is located on Harbour Terrace and is an initiative established by Otago Polytechnic's School of Hospitality and its Food Design Institute, training future chefs, hotel managers and restaurant staff under the guidance of industry professionals. The restaurant uses produce from local suppliers and Otago Polytechnic's Living Campus gardens. The restaurant offers lunchtime and evening dining to members of the public and hosts a wide range of themed events throughout the year, including midwinter Christmas dining.

Otago Polytechnic previously operated a Community Learning Centre in Mosgiel which delivered introductory computer training to the public and hosted short computing courses, including the NZQF Level 3 "Introduction to Computing" programme. The course was offered free of charge and covered basic computing skills such as Windows, Microsoft Word, Excel, PowerPoint, internet use, and file management. In 2025, the Mosgiel Community Learning Centre was reported as closed in February due to unforeseen circumstances.

=== Central Otago campus ===
Otago Polytechnic's Central Otago campus is located in Cromwell at Bannockburn Road. The polytechnic set up its first Cromwell base in 1987, in the former Cromwell Primary School on Molyneux Avenue, where it taught horticulture and tourism and ran the Molyneux Restaurant as a training restaurant. It later leased a horticulture block on Bannockburn Road, and decided by 2016 to buy the Bannockburn site and consolidate its Central Otago operations there. Teaching at the former site on the corner of Molyneux Ave and Erris St ended in late 2025. Programmes on offer include long and short courses in Cookery, Business, and Horticulture. Cardrona Alpine Resort and Mount Aspiring College deliver qualifications in Ski and Snowboard Instruction and Avalanche Safety. Otago Polytechnic's Central campus launched a qualification in high country farming in 2014, which is the only one of its kind in New Zealand. There are two Community Learning Centres which hold computing courses as well as being able to provide career guidance and study assistance for Otago Polytechnic students – these are on the Central Otago Campus and in Queenstown. In 2009, the two Community Learning Centres in Wanaka and Alexandra were closed.

Otago Polytechnic also has a campus in Wānaka, on Cliff Wilson Street, which specialises in outdoor and adventure education, snow sports, avalanche safety and midwifery. Wānaka and Cromwell campuses make up the polytechnic's Central campus. Outdoor and adventure education moved to Wānaka in 2020.

=== Auckland International campus ===
The Auckland International Campus caters to international students and offers professional qualifications in Business and Management, Information Technology as well as National Diplomas in Construction Management and Quantity Surveying. Classes are taught in English. The Auckland International Campus is located on Queen Street in downtown Auckland. It opened in 2012 in partnership with the private Future Skills Academy, and was the polytechnic's first campus outside Otago. It initially offered English language courses and an applied management degree.

=== Former campuses ===
The polytechnic ran occasional courses in Oamaru from the late 1970s, and from the early 1980s used rented premises there. It opened a purpose-built campus on Humber Street in 1990, which offered courses in commerce, community studies, horticulture and hospitality and had a training restaurant, TechNique. The campus struggled to keep student numbers up, and the polytechnic sold it to Aoraki Polytechnic in 2006.

The polytechnic also taught in Queenstown, first in the Clocktower Building in the town centre and from 1996 partly at Wakatipu High School. It closed the Queenstown campus in 1998 and returned in 2000, teaching from various premises.

== Student accommodation ==
Otago Polytechnic began providing dedicated student accommodation in Dunedin in 1990, when it entered a joint venture with the Young Women's Christian Association (YWCA) to convert its boarding hostel at 97 Moray Place, known as Kinnaird House, into a 95-bed hall of residence primarily for polytechnic students. The following year, the polytechnic provided an interest-free advance of $500,000 to the University of Otago towards student accommodation, in return for places being reserved for its students in university halls of residence.

In 1992, the polytechnic established a 100-bed hall of residence known as the Chalets in Clyde, Central Otago, using former hostels built for workers on the Clyde Dam project. In Dunedin, it subsequently leased Santa Sabina, a former Dominican convent in North Dunedin, as an 18-bed hostel in 1998. Further accommodation arrangements included places at City College, a 190-bed apartment-style complex shared with students from the University of Otago and the Dunedin College of Education, which opened in 2000. From the same year, the polytechnic leased Station Apartments on Anzac Avenue and flats in Harbour Terrace, Forth Street and Dundas Street, which it sublet mainly to first-year students. The polytechnic also arranged accommodation at Reavers Lodge in Queenstown for hospitality staff and students.

In 2018, Otago Polytechnic officially opened its new 231-bed student accommodation complex, Te Pā Tauira – Otago Polytechnic Student Village, at its Dunedin campus. It features dorm rooms, studios and apartments. The $22 million building, designed by Mason & Wales architects, is the largest timber-framed construction in New Zealand at 6,000 square metres. The sustainable, cross-laminated timber structure won two awards at the Property Council New Zealand Rider Levett Bucknall Property Industry Awards 2018: Award of Excellence for Green Building and an Award of Merit for Multi-Unit Residential Property.

At its Central Otago campus in the same year, the Polytechnic opened its $3 million, 25-bed student housing complex of fully self-contained units.

== International students ==
Otago Polytechnic offers education and training to both New Zealand and international students. In 2024, Otago Polytechnic had 1,040 equivalent full-time international students.

Otago Polytechnic's English Language Centre offers academic and general English courses, aimed at international students or migrants to Dunedin. Otago Polytechnic's Central Otago and Auckland International campuses also offer English Language courses.

== Research and postgraduate ==
Its EPICentre is a multidisciplinary workshop studio, available to staff and students as a research facility.

In 2007, the polytechnic opened a rapid prototyping facility in A Block for design students. It became the centre of a commercial product design and research unit, later called workSpace, which took on projects for outside clients, including a single-blade domestic wind turbine for a Dunedin firm. The Upstart business incubator, set up in 2004 by the polytechnic, the University of Otago and the Dunedin City Council, moved from the city centre to the Forth Street campus in 2013. In 2015, 160 staff members were engaged in research.

=== Open education ===
In 2008, Otago Polytechnic adopted a Creative Commons intellectual property policy that let people copy, distribute and adapt its material if they credited the source. Its official history states that it was the first tertiary institution in the world to do so. In 2009, it set up the International Centre for Open Education and the Open Education Resource Foundation, a charitable company to support the centre. In 2013, the foundation coordinated the Open Education Resource universitas (OERu), an international network of tertiary institutions offering free online courses. Students pay only for assessment if they want the courses to count towards a qualification. UNESCO and the Commonwealth of Learning established a joint chair at the polytechnic, first held by Wayne Mackintosh, the founder of WikiEducator. It was later divided into two chairs, with Mackintosh as UNESCO chair and Robin Day as COL chair.

== Student exchange programmes and international partnerships ==
Otago Polytechnic offers a range of student exchange programmes, available to Otago Polytechnic and international students through its Study Abroad and Explore More initiatives.

International programmes include English language teaching internships, summer school scholarship programmes, winter school scholarship programmes, and partnerships with tertiary institutions in North America, South America, Europe and Asia. Otago Polytechnic also runs an education scholarship programme with its sister-city, Shanghai.

== Staff at Otago Polytechnic ==
The polytechnic began in 1966 with the equivalent of 40 full-time tutors and about half that number of allied staff. By 1989 it employed 190 full-time-equivalent tutors and 66 allied staff, and in 2015 it employed 674 staff, just over 500 of them on a full-time-equivalent basis. Staff first took industrial action in 1988, in a one-day national strike against changes to state sector employment law.

Otago Polytechnic has a workforce totalling 543 permanent staff as at the end of 2017. Its pay equity gap in 2017 sat at 4.8 per cent, considerably lower than the national average of 11 per cent.

== Sustainability ==
Otago Polytechnic has a sustainable campus. During the past three years, Otago Polytechnic has steadily increased the amount of cardboard, glass and plastic they recycle. Otago Polytechnic now recycles the following materials: paper; cardboard; glass; aluminium and steel cans; plastic types 1, 2, 3, 4, 5 and 6; cooking oil and organic waste. The Polytechnic has also managed to reduce its amount of general waste by over two hundred cubic metres.

Since 2012, Otago Polytechnic has implemented some significant changes to reduce its ecological footprint, including creating an internal offset scheme for staff air travel. Otago Polytechnic also recently replaced coal-fired boilers with local woodchip boilers. As well as utilising a renewable energy resource, the potash will be used on the Living Campus gardens.

In 2006 the polytechnic set itself the goal of becoming a sustainable organisation and of teaching sustainability in all its qualifications. Its Centre for Sustainable Practice, based at the Central Otago campus, ran courses in sustainable business and set up New Zealand's first biodiesel refuelling facility in Queenstown.

The Living Campus project is the first of its kind in Australasia and involves turning Otago Polytechnic's existing Dunedin campus into an open-air and interactive museum, a vibrant community garden and a sustainable model of urban agriculture.

In 2015 Otago Polytechnic became the first polytechnic in New Zealand to achieve fair trade status. The institution has been awarded the Fair Trade status in recognition of its commitment to sell only Fair Trade products such as tea, coffee, sugar and chocolate drinks in its cafes and other commercial outlets, and sourcing Fair Trade materials for its schools where appropriate. This is in line with the city of Dunedin's stance towards Fair Trade practice. Dunedin was formally recognised by the Fair Trade Association as New Zealand's first Free Trade city in 2009.

== Partnership with Kāi Tahu ==
In 2004, Otago Polytechnic signed a Memorandum of Understanding (MoU) with the four Araiteuru Papatipu Rūnaka, or local Māori councils: Te Rūnanga ō Moeraki, Kāti Huirapa Rūnaka ki Puketeraki, Te Runangaō Ōtākou, and Hokonui Rūnanga. It was reviewed, revised and re-signed by all parties in 2013. The Memorandum guides the Polytechnic's goals and activities, underpinning its Māori Strategic Framework. The MoU's principal objectives are to support and contribute to the achievement of Māori development aspirations, and work together to identify specific educational needs of Kāi Tahu.

Under the 2004 agreement the council set up a committee, Te Komiti Kawanataka, to advise it on Māori matters, and the polytechnic appointed Khyla Russell as kaitohutohu (Māori advisor). It adopted its Māori name, Te Kura Matatini ki Otago, at the same time. Russell later became the polytechnic's second professor.

== The Charity House Project ==
Before the project began, carpentry students had built full-size buildings for non-profit groups since 1975, such as the Youth Adventure Trust at Berwick and the Tapanui Bowling Club.

Otago Polytechnic’s Charity House project was a long-running initiative in which carpentry, electrical trades and He Toki students built residential houses on its Dunedin campus that were then auctioned for charity. The project began in 2007 and over its 18 years raised more than $1.7 million for local charities through the Catalytic Foundation, with the help of local businesses that donated materials, labour and expertise.

In 2025 the Polytechnic announced that the annual Charity House auction would be paused after the November sale because rising material and compliance costs and a difficult housing market made the initiative financially unsustainable and meant there was no surplus profit to donate to charity. The 2025 auction was intended to be the final Charity House sale for the time being, although offers on the student-built properties continued after the hammer fell with no bids during the event itself.

Although the traditional charity auction has been paused, Otago Polytechnic said it will continue to construct three houses each year on site for student learning, sell those at cost to the community, and explore other projects that benefit local organisations.

== Student services ==
Otago Polytechnic offers a range of student services, both itself and in conjunction with University of Otago and Otago Polytechnic Students' Association. These include internal services such as a Childcare Centre, Student Learning Centre, Student Health Centre, Student IT Services and Te Punaka Ōwheo, its dedicated Māori centre. In partnership with Otago University, Polytechnic students have access to UNIPOL Recreation Centre and the Robertson Library.

All enrolled Otago Polytechnic students may consider themselves members of the Otago Polytechnic Students' Association, an independent organisation run by the students and offers support, social events and clubs, access to facilities and services, and the free student magazine, Gyro.

== Students' association ==
The association was set up in 1964, two years before the polytechnic opened, as the Polytechnic Full Time Students' Association. Membership was compulsory for full-time students and was later extended to part-time students. The association joined a national body of technical institute students' associations in 1971 and published a student newspaper from 1974. The publication, initially called SAM (Students' Association Magazine), later became known as Gyro. Membership became voluntary under a 2011 law change, although the polytechnic continued to collect a student services fee and the association continued to provide most services.

The Otago Polytechnic Students' Association provides access to facilities and services, including student ID cards, the Clubs & Societies Centre, UNIPOL Sports Centre, social events and Student Job Search.

The students' association also provides support services like advocacy, campaigns, representation, financial assistance and advice. OPSA has also worked with local authorities representing student views, especially on transportation and housing issues.

The students' association has also campaigned for everyone's right to tertiary education, arguing that user-pays education creates a significant barrier to this right. It has sought a return to free tertiary education as it was before 1989.

In 2009 the Otago Polytechnic Students' Association warned members they faced expulsion if they participated in illegal activities at an underground Undie 500 event. In 2009 the students' association campaigned against the government's removal of student representation from polytechnic councils.
