= Robert Perks (musician) =

New Zealand musical educator

Robert Perks (December 1919 – July 2005) was a New Zealand music educator, conductor, composer and multi-instrumentalist. He founded the Christchurch School of Instrumental Music in 1955 and served as its musical director until 1975. Perks was appointed a Member of the Order of the British Empire for services to music education in 1985.

Robert Perks conducting at the Christchurch School of Music

== Biography ==
=== Early life ===
Robert Perks was born in St Clair Dunedin, New Zealand, in December 1919 to John Alfred Perks (a newsagent or delivery agent for the "Evening Star") and Mabel May Perks. He attended St Clair Primary School from 1925 to 1931. He entered Dunedin Technical High School (also known as King Edward Technical College) in 1932.

While at the Dunedin Technical College, he came under the influence of T Vernon Griffiths, and credits his musical career to Professor Griffiths: "He started me on my musical career. What a great man he is. I owe him more than any other man." Griffiths paid for his advanced piano tuition out of his "own meagre pay". According to Perks, it was the intervention of Griffiths and Perks' headmaster, that meant the young Perks did not become a butcher and was able to pursue a music education career.

He married Myrtle Wood of Roxburgh in 1942.

=== Education ===
In 1938, Perks began studying at Dunedin Teachers' Training College, specialising in music and received a University of Otago music bursary. He completed a Bachelor of Music degree in 1941.

Perks enlisted in the Army in 1941 and later transferred to the Navy and was able to continue his studies while a Petty Officer radio mechanic in the Navy. While at the Devonport Base he became the official organist and took lessons from the Auckland Cathedral organist, Edgar Randal. He gained the Licentiate of the Royal Schools of Music diploma in organ in 1944.

=== Career ===
In 1945, Perks became music master at Christchurch Technical College, where he worked for nine years before joining Christchurch Teachers’ College in 1954. He had broad experience teaching young people and wrote two school music publications that were widely used in New Zealand schools. In 1955, Perks began an experimental instrumental scheme for 140 primary-school pupils under a subcommittee of the Primary Schools’ Music Festival Association. The scheme aimed to provide affordable group tuition and practical experience of orchestral playing. This became the Christchurch School of Instrumental Music (later the Te Kura Puoro). The school reached about thousand students by 1967 and continued to grow each year while he was the Music Director of that organisation from 1955 to 1975.

Perks was also an award-winning composer, winning the composition competition run by the Canterbury Centennial Association in 1950, among other awards. An Allegro was performed by the Christchurch Chamber Music Players in 1952. He regularly composed music for young musicians to play.

== Published works ==
Robert Perks wrote a series of books for music teachers, learners and families. They were published by local publishers AH and AW Reed. The series was called Music in School, A modern approach in the classroom. Book 1 was the Teacher's Manual, book 2 was Short Score, and book 3 was The Main Progression (for beginners) Supplementary Parts. The series included scores for playing in groups for different instruments including recorder (descant), cello, bass, B Flat clarinet, percussion, melodica and autoharp, chime bar, and guitar. He also wrote Music Making in School and Home, also published by Reeds in 1965.

As an academic, Perks published a few accounts of his musical education endeavours, or as he termed them, "experiments". In the London journal, "Music in Education" he described his work in mass music education as, "an interesting New Zealand experiment." Similarly, a year earlier he published "Christchurch music experiment: schools instrumental scheme" in the New Zealand journal "National Education".

== Honours and legacy ==
Perks was awarded life membership of the Christchurch School of Instrumental Music in 1978. At the time the newspaper, The Press, commented, "The success attending Mr Perks' efforts has aroused interest abroad, and the numbers of players in orchestras from the New Zealand Symphony Orchestra downwards, who began their training in the C.S.I.M. orchestras, is sufficient tribute to the worth of the training. They and the many hundreds of others who owe their present love of music and attendant broadening of their experiences to Mr Perks and his work must be a constant satisfaction to him in his retirement."

He continued to conduct former pupils at the school’s 25th-anniversary celebrations in 1980, conducting the CSIM Alumnae Orchestra. He was appointed a Member of the Order of the British Empire for services to music education in the 1985, and his legacy is recognised through the Robert Perks Scholarship. He died in July 2005, aged 85.
