= Efts =

Efts, EFTS, or variants may refer to:

- Efts, juvenile newts
- EFTS (Equivalent Full Time Student), a measure of student numbers
- EF-Ts (elongation factor thermo stable), a prokaryotic elongation factor
- Elementary Flying Training School, a Royal Air Force school

== See also ==
- EFT (disambiguation), for the singular
