= FORMIND =

Simulation of a tropical mountain forest in Ecuador using Formind. The simulation includes also a landslide event. The colours represent different tree species groups.

FORMIND (forest model individual-based) is an individual based forest gap model that is able to simulate the growth of species-rich forests. It was developed in the late 1990s to simulate forest dynamics of tropical forests.

== Forest dynamics and classical forest gap models ==
Gaps in a forest arise from disturbances, often resulting from large dying trees, ranging from a large branch breaking off and dropping from a tree, to a tree falling over, to landslides bringing down large groups of trees. Once a gap has formed, light-demanding tree species can establish and a succession of different tree species occurs over time.

Gap models have been used to study forest succession and to investigate the mechanisms underlying the long-term dynamics of forest ecosystems (stand level modelling).

Forest Gap models share the following principles:

- Forests are represented as a collection of small patches. The forest successional stage and age vary across patches.
- Patches are independent of their neighborhoods and do not interact with other patches. Thus, dynamic processes such as tree recruitment, growth and mortality are calculated separately for each patch.
- All patches are assumed to be homogeneous regarding the resource conditions (i.e., light reaching the upper canopy). The size of one patch is usually chosen according to the extent of the largest possible tree crown (e.g., 20 m x 20 m). All trees in a patch are interacting whereby tree positions are not relevant.
- Trees standing within one patch compete for light due to asymmetric shading effects of larger tree canopies on smaller ones. Crown and stem shapes are modeled by different geometries (e.g. cylinder form).

Initially, forest gap models were applied to temperate forests. For more complex forests as found in the tropics, gap models have to account for higher species-richness. Additionally, natural forests normally consist of patches in different successional stages. Their dynamics are mainly governed by falling trees creating gaps. Moreover, human-induced disturbances (e.g., logging or fragmentation) affect the overall dynamics of forests worldwide. To include these processes, forest models needed to combine complexity and structural realism with efficient computing.

== FORMIND model development ==
FORMIND was developed in the late 1990s to simulate tropical forest dynamics more realistically than before. In FORMIND, physiological processes such as photosynthesis and respiration are simulated at the tree level (process-based model). Dying large trees can fall down and create gaps in the forest. Forest stands of several hundred hectares can be simulated over a time period of a few centuries on an annual time step. The simulation area is a composite of 20-m × 20-m patches typical for forest gap models. In FORMIND, these patches interact via seed dispersal and the falling of large trees. The basic model includes four main process groups: tree growth, tree mortality, recruitment of tree seedlings, and competition between trees.

Beside this, four important aspects are incorporated into FORMIND which are intended to be applicable to tropical forest sites. This distinguishes FORMIND from classical forest gap models:

1. The high tree species-richness in tropical forests is covered by the concept of plant functional types (PFTs), i.e., grouping of tree species.
2. Disturbances, both on small and large scale, caused by either natural reasons (e.g. tree falling, edge effects) or anthropogenic activities (e.g. tree logging) can be investigated in their effects on forest structure and dynamics.
3. The calculated carbon balance of individual trees is based on a detailed process-based approach that enables upscaling to estimate carbon fluxes for small or large forest areas. The current version of FORMIND uses dynamic global vegetation model approaches to simulate the carbon cycle of forests on a continental scale (e.g. for the whole Amazon,).
4. The model can be merged with remote sensing data (e.g. forest height from Lidar or Radar).
5. The model can be also applied at temperate and boreal sites.

== Modeled processes ==
Tree growth: Tree biomass growth is determined by a physiology-based tree carbon balance that includes leaf photosynthesis, maintenance and growth respiratory costs. An increase in tree biomass results in increments in height, stem diameter, stem volume and leaf area using allometric relationships.

Tree mortality: Background mortality is generally calculated from a mean annual mortality rate. Alternatively, the model also allows calculating mortality as a function of tree size or stem diameter growth. In addition, trees compete for space. In crowded stands mortality rate is increased if crowns of trees overlap. If large trees die, they have a certain probability of falling over into neighboring patches, in which their crowns damage smaller trees and create canopy gaps. Thus, trees might die for various reasons (age, growth rate, space competition, tree fall damage). All individual tree mortalities are simulated as stochastic events.

Recruitment: Trees emerge from seeds, which can originate either from a surrounding forest (constant seed rain) or from mother trees within the same forest stand. As seeds need a certain amount of light to germinate, their development might be hindered by shading of other trees. In that case, seeds are accumulated in the soil of a patch (seedbank) for a certain time until the light conditions are appropriate for germination. While waiting for better light conditions, a fraction of the seeds die (seed mortality). As soon as the light conditions change (e.g., through gap creation), seeds can receive sufficient light to germinate.

Tree competition: The competition between individual trees is threefold. First, tree growth is mainly driven by light. Large trees in a patch receive most of the incoming radiation and shade smaller trees (asymmetric light competition). Second, trees compete for space. Trees in crowded patches are reduced by increasing mortality. Third, between neighboring patches, the gap created by the falling of a large tree increases the local mortality rates. Furthermore, seed dispersal from mother trees leads to additional interactions among patches.

Each modeled process is flexible enough to be parameterized for a specific study site. It takes a site specific forest inventory and stem diameter increment measurements to obtain values for model parametrization. For site-specific adaptation of the model additional information is helpful. Missing parameter values can be determined by a calibration process using as reference inventory data of mature forests (e.g. in some studies this has been done for the recruitment rates). However, most parameters used in the model are known from literature (at least their typical ranges). For example, in tropical forests, approximately 1–2% of the standing trees die annually.

== Current and future applications ==
Forest factory approach: Forest gap models like FORMIND can be used to study the relationship between forest productivity and species diversity. Recent studies have shown that forest productivity often increases with increasing tree species diversity. However, several studies show unchanged or even inverse relationships between productivity and diversity. We studied a broader range of diversity-productivity relationships. Instead of long-term simulations, thousands of different forest stands have been generated, combining different species mixtures with various forest structures (e.g., different basal area values or heterogenic tree heights). This approach is called forest factory and introduce a fundamental new concept for using vegetation models. For each of these virtual forest stands, forest productivity can be calculated using forest gap models. The obtained diversity – productivity relationships can then be compared to field studies. This new way of using a forest gap model as an analysis tool of a large number of forest stands enables a much faster analysis of numerous forests compared with the classical method of simulating forest successions (forest factory approach).

Integration of forest inventory data for parameter calibration: Parameter estimation in forest gap models is a time-consuming process. Manual calibration and sensitivity analysis of these models require a large number of simulations, leading to a higher computational demand. Thus, for the automatic calibration of model parameters, when direct measurements are missing or made under specific conditions (e.g., climate, soil), a collection of rapid stochastic calibration methods have been developed and applied in FORMIND. These methods automatically minimize the difference between simulation results and field observations by running the model a thousand times. Additionally, for the assessment of parameter uncertainty, approximate Bayesian methods can be used in combination with a Markov chain Monte Carlo approach. These methods can also be used for forest sites where a limited number of observations in time and space are available. After careful examination of the model results and available observation data, a combination of manual and automatic calibrations leads to the successful parameterization of forest gap models.

Linking forest modelling and remote sensing: A very recent and promising application of forest models is in combination with remote sensing measurements. Techniques such as Radar (Radio detection and ranging, in the context of Tandem-X and Tandem-L satellite mission) and Lidar (Light detection and ranging) are capable of measuring the 3D-structures of forests. However, important attributes of the forests, such as biomass, can only be estimated indirectly with remote sensing using empirical relationships. The derivation of such relationships has long been limited by the availability of field data and the spatial resolution of remote sensing data. Virtual forests inventory data generated by forest models provide a novel approach to explore forest structures and develop new concepts for remote sensing measurements. FORMIND has served to investigate the relationship between canopy height and aboveground biomass as a function of spatial scale. These relationships have been analysed also for disturbed forest stand.

In the near future, FORMIND will also be used to improve the understanding of the relationship between forest structure and other ecosystem functions, e.g., forest productivity.

== See also ==
forest

tropical forest

stand level modelling

dynamic global vegetation model

carbon cycle
