= Cathy Andrew =

New Zealand nursing academic

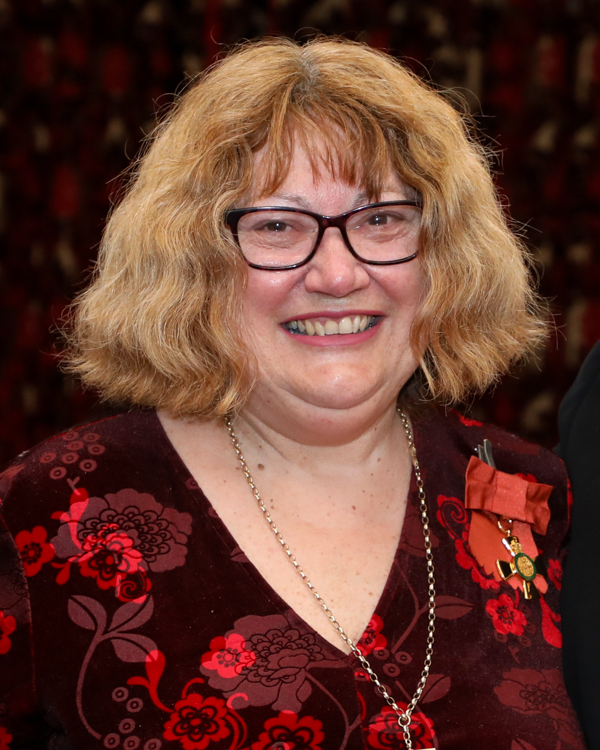
- Andrew in 2023
- Awards: Officer of the New Zealand Order of Merit

Academic background
- Education: Massey University, University of Newcastle
- Theses: Optimising the human experience: the lived world of nursing the families of people who die in intensive care (1997); The ICU legacy a phenomenological study of the impact of having a family member die in Intensive Care and how that is lived through in the months that follow (2005)
- Academic advisor: Judith Carol Christensen

Catherine Mary Andrew ONZM is a New Zealand nurse and nursing academic, and is an associate professor at the University of Canterbury. In 2023 Andrew was appointed an Officer of the New Zealand Order of Merit, for services to nursing education.

== Education and training ==
Andrew completed a Bachelor of Arts at Massey University, and a Diploma in Nursing at Nelson Polytechnic. She then earned a Master of Arts with Honours with a thesis titled Optimising the human experience: the lived world of nursing the families of people who die in intensive care at Massey University, and a PhD at the University of Newcastle in Australia.

== Career ==
Andrew then joined the faculty of the University of Canterbury, rising to associate professor. She was appointed to the position of Executive Dean of the Faculty of Health in 2022. Andrew has been a trustee of the Nurse Maude Association since 2013.

Andrew has worked as a nurse in the UK and New Zealand. Andrew was Head of Nursing at Ara Institute of Canterbury for twenty years from 2000, where she redeveloped the struggling nursing programme, creating New Zealand's first graduate entry pathway.

Andrew served as chair of the Nursing Education in the Tertiary Sector network for several years. She consults on nursing education nationally for the Nursing Council of New Zealand and throughout the Pacific.

== Honours and awards ==
In the 2023 King's Birthday and Coronation Honours, Andrew was appointed an Officer of the New Zealand Order of Merit, for services to nursing education.

== Selected works ==
- Jo Borren; Erik Brogt; Andrew, Catherine Mary; Kaye Milligan (2023). "A qualitative analysis investigating competence assessment of undergraduate nursing students". Contemporary Nurse. 59 (4–5): 392–401. doi:10.1080/10376178.2023.2242972. PMID 37559234. Wikidata Q127770202.
- Isabel Jamieson; Andrew, Catherine Mary; Jacinda King (December 2021), Keeping our borders Safe: The social stigma of nursing in managed isolation and quarantine border facilities during the COVID-19 pandemic, pp. 53–61, doi:10.36951/27034542.2021.035, Wikidata Q127770210
- Kai Ru Goh; Andrew, Catherine Mary (2021). "Promoting safety awareness and protection skills for people with disabilities: a literature review". The Journal of Adult Protection. 23 (4): 225–237. doi:10.1108/jap-11-2020-0049. Wikidata Q127770214.
- Isabel Jamieson; Kirk, Ray; Sarah Wright; Andrew, Catherine Mary (2015). "Generation Y New Zealand Registered Nurses' views about nursing work: a survey of motivation and maintenance factors". Nursing Open. 2 (2): 49–61. doi:10.1002/nop2.16. PMC 5047315. PMID 27708801. Wikidata Q37305296.
- Isabel Jamieson; Kirk, Ray; Andrew, Catherine Mary (2013). "Work-Life Balance: What Generation Y Nurses Want". Nurse Leader. 11 (3): 36–39. doi:10.1016/j.mnl.2013.01.010. Wikidata Q126951164.
