= Integrated Biosphere Simulator =

IBIS-2 is the version 2 of the land-surface model Integrated Biosphere Simulator (IBIS), which includes several major improvements and additions to the prototype model developed by Foley et al. [1996]. IBIS was designed to explicitly link land surface and hydrological processes, terrestrial biogeochemical cycles, and vegetation dynamics within a single physically consistent framework

== IBIS Functionality ==
The model considers transient changes in vegetation composition and structure in response to environmental change and is, therefore, classified as a Dynamic Global Vegetation Model (DGVM) This new version of IBIS has improved representations of land surface physics, plant physiology, canopy phenology, plant functional type (PFT) differences, and carbon allocation. Furthermore, IBIS-2 includes a new belowground biogeochemistry submodel, which is coupled to detritus production (litterfall and fine root turnover). All process are organized in a hierarchical framework and operate at different time steps, ranging from 60 min to 1 year. Such an approach allows for explicit coupling among ecological, biophysical, and physiological processes occurring on different timescales.

== IBIS Structure ==
The land surface module is based on the land surface transfer model (LSX) package of Thompson and Pollard, and simulates the energy, water, carbon, and momentum balance of the soil-vegetation-atmosphere system. The model represents two vegetation canopies (e.g., trees versus shrubs and grasses), eight soil layers, and three layers of snow (when required). The solar radiative transfer scheme of IBIS-2 has been simplified in comparison with LSX and IBIS-1; sunlit and shaded fractions of the canopies are no longer treated separately. The model now follows the approach of Sellers et al. [1986] and Bonan [1995]. Infrared radiation is simulated as if each vegetation layer is a semitransparent plane; canopy emissivity depends on foliage density. Another difference between IBIS-2 and IBIS-1 and LSX, is that IBIS-2 uses an empirical linear function of wind speed to estimate turbulent transfer between the soil surface and the lower vegetation canopy, and IBIS-1 and LSX use a logarithmic wind profile. The total evapotranspiration from the land surface is treated as the sum of three water vapor fluxes: evaporation from the soil surface, evaporation of water intercepted by vegetation canopies, and canopy transpiration.

IBIS simulates the variations of heat and moisture in the soil. The eight layers are described in terms of soil temperature, volumetric water content and ice content. All the process occurring in the soil are influenced by the soil texture and amount of organic matter within the soil. One difference from the physiological processes in the previous version of the model is that IBIS-1 calculates the maximum Rubisco carboxylation capacity (Vm) by optimizing the net assimilation of carbon by the leaf. IBIS-2 prescribes constant values of Vm for the plant functional typed (PFT). To scale photosynthesis and transpiration from the leaf level to canopy level, IBIS-2 assumes that the net photosynthesis within the canopy is proportional to the APAR within it.

== Soil Biogeochemistry ==
In the original version of IBIS there was no explicit below ground biogeochemistry model to complete flow of carbon between the vegetation, detritus, and soil organic matter pools. IBIS-2 includes a new soil biogeochemistry module.
