= UW Bothell Wetland Restoration Project =

The UW Bothell/Cascadia College Wetland Restoration Project is a 58-acre forested floodplain restoration site at the delta of North Creek in King County, Washington, USA. The State of Washington bought the site in 1994 from the Truly family, and dedicated the land to the construction of the Bothell regional campus of the University of Washington and Cascadia College. Construction began in 1998, as did the stream and floodplain restoration. Two years later, in 2000, classes opened for students, and in 2001 the main phase of the restoration was completed. Today the site is an ongoing area of restoration education.

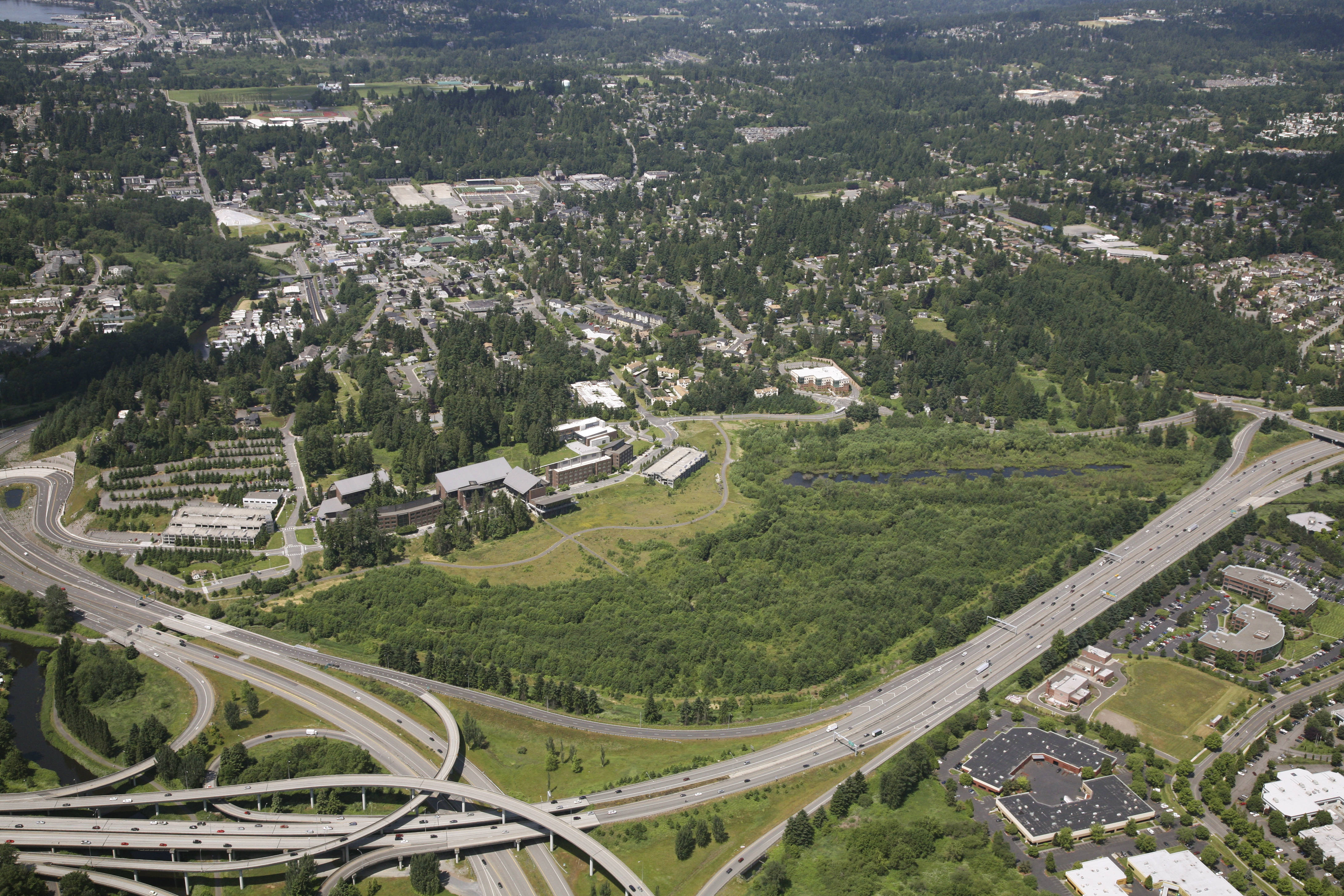
This photo, taken by George White in Summer 2011, shows the wetland nine years post restoration.

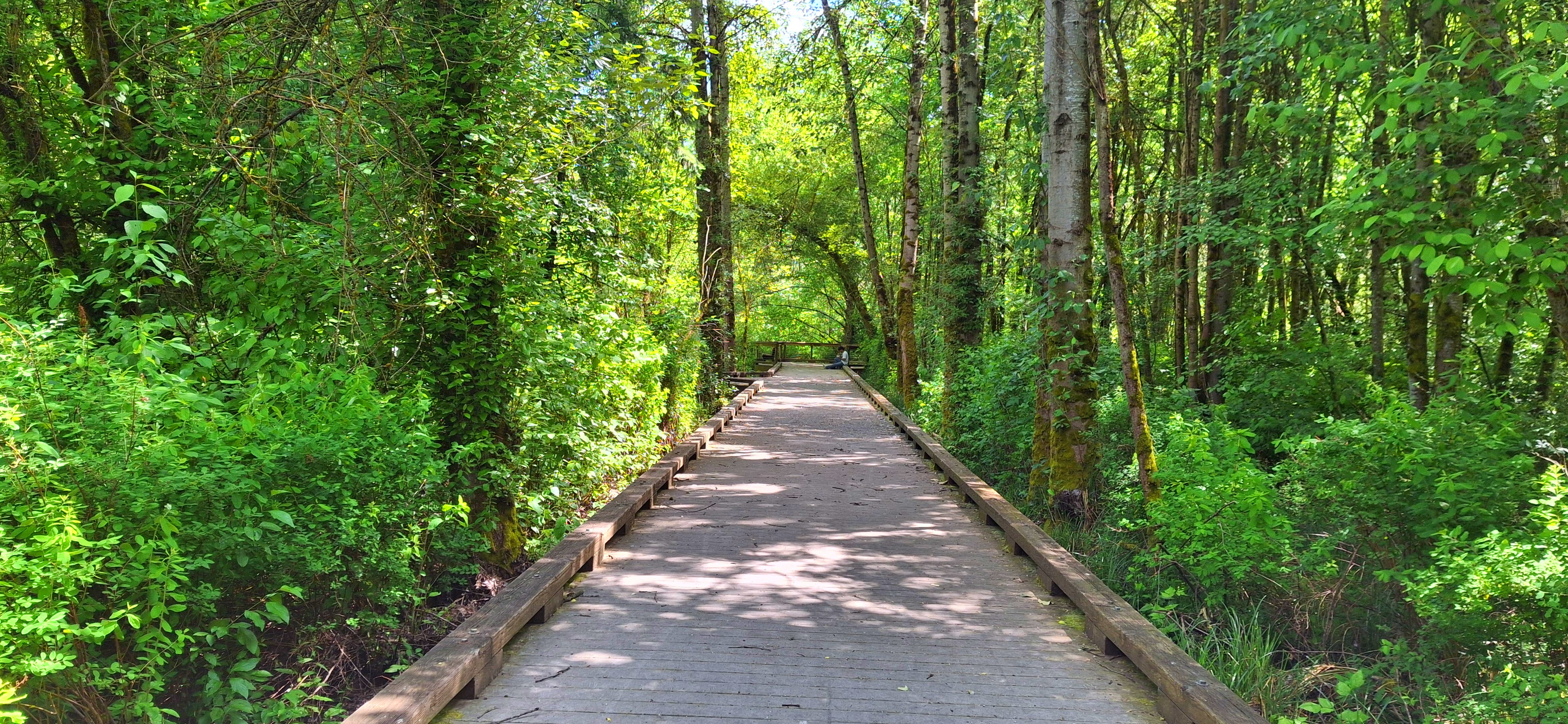
The wetland in 2026

== History ==
Before European settlement, the UW Bothell Wetlands site was composed of small lakes and complex runoff channels. North Creek's hydrology has been influenced by Lake Washington and water runoff from the surrounding watershed. Urbanization in recent decades has also influenced the hydrology of North Creek, as impervious surface cover increased the rate of flow of North Creek.

=== Historical hydrology and geology ===
Hydrologic modifications to North Creek prior to restoration included straightening, channeling and levee building. Modifying North Creek would allow for the delivery of logs easily downstream to the mills on Lake Washington. These modifications limited the creek's ability to reconnect to its historical floodplain, which resulted in poor water quality and reductions in fish populations. From 1913 to 1916, the opening of the Hiram Chittenden Locks dropped Lake Washington by 12 feet. This change in hydrology dried the historical floodplain, allowing this land to be developed and farmed. Invasive species, such as reed canary grass, once fed the grazing animals on the pastures, but now competes with native shrub and herbaceous plant species.

The soil mixes present in North Creek's floodplain consist of lake and marsh sediment, volcanic ash, floodplain alluvium, and organic deposits. The floodplain also contains stratified layers that suggest standing water and, “marsh to mixed marsh-forested wetland”.

=== Historical flora and fauna ===
Flora in the floodplain historically consisted of ‘scrub-shrub’ and early successional communities. Western Redcedar (Thuja plicata), Black Cottonwood (Populus trichocarpa), Douglas-fir (Pseudotsuga menziesii), Big Leaf Maple (Acer macrophyllum), and Red Alder (Alnus rubra) were the dominating tree species. These dominant species were first logged before 1895 and were shipped to sawmills around Lake Washington, using North Creek as a means of transport.

=== North Creek watershed ===
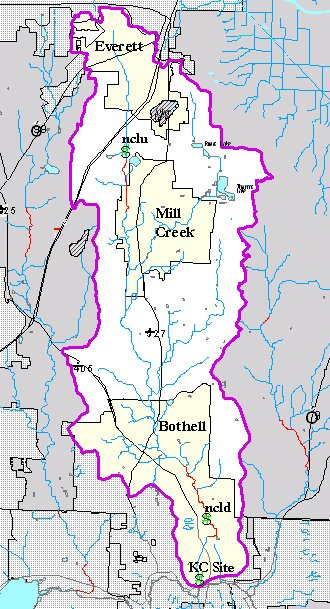
Outlined in pink, is the North Creek Watershed Boundary. This is the area of influence on the wetland restoration site.

The North Creek watershed is an area of approximately 30 square miles that discharges into the Sammamish River, and eventually Lake Washington. The predominant land type in North Creek's watershed is urban, but fragments of forest exist, including the 64 acre North Creek Forest. However, “Urbanization and land development activities greatly affect water quality in the basin through riparian corridor alteration, conversion of forests, inadequate retention/detention of stormwater from new and existing impervious surfaces, and poorly treated stormwater run-off”.

=== Truly homestead ===
Since the 1930s, the area now occupied by the North Creek Wetland was used for farming and grazing. Drainage systems were implemented by various owners of the property, including the Truly Family, to modify the existing groundwater and surface waters.

== Restoration design ==
Because the construction of the UWB/Cascadia campus caused the destruction of 6 acres of a hillslope wetland ecosystem, the State of Washington had to mitigate this loss under the 1989 Federal Wetlands Delineation Protocol of the Clean Water Act. The State chose to restore the degraded floodplain to a high standard of function, at a ratio of nearly 10:1 replacement of a distinct kind of wetland for the destroyed wetlands on the same site. The restoration project is an effort to restore ecosystem functions such as water purification, flood protection, groundwater recharge and streamflow maintenance. The Wetland was designed to support Fish and Wildlife, as well as plant species, by providing the proper habitat.

The restoration of the wetlands considered the chemical, physical, and hydrological processes that are present in healthy stream and floodplain ecosystems. Among these features is micro-topography; small variations in ground elevation that create a diversity of habitat for biota. Using reference sites in the Puget Sound Lowlands, the design for stream channel morphology was created. This design would facilitate the biogeochemical exchanges between land and water. For example, the careful placement of large woody debris was used to create diversity of stream bank habitat. The success of the wetland restoration is largely due to the establishment of these hydrogeological characteristics.

The first step of restoring the floodplain was to scrape the top 12 inches of soil off in the southern area of the site, and add up to 24 inches of fill soil to the northern half of the site. Creating this slope on the site helped deter invasive species.

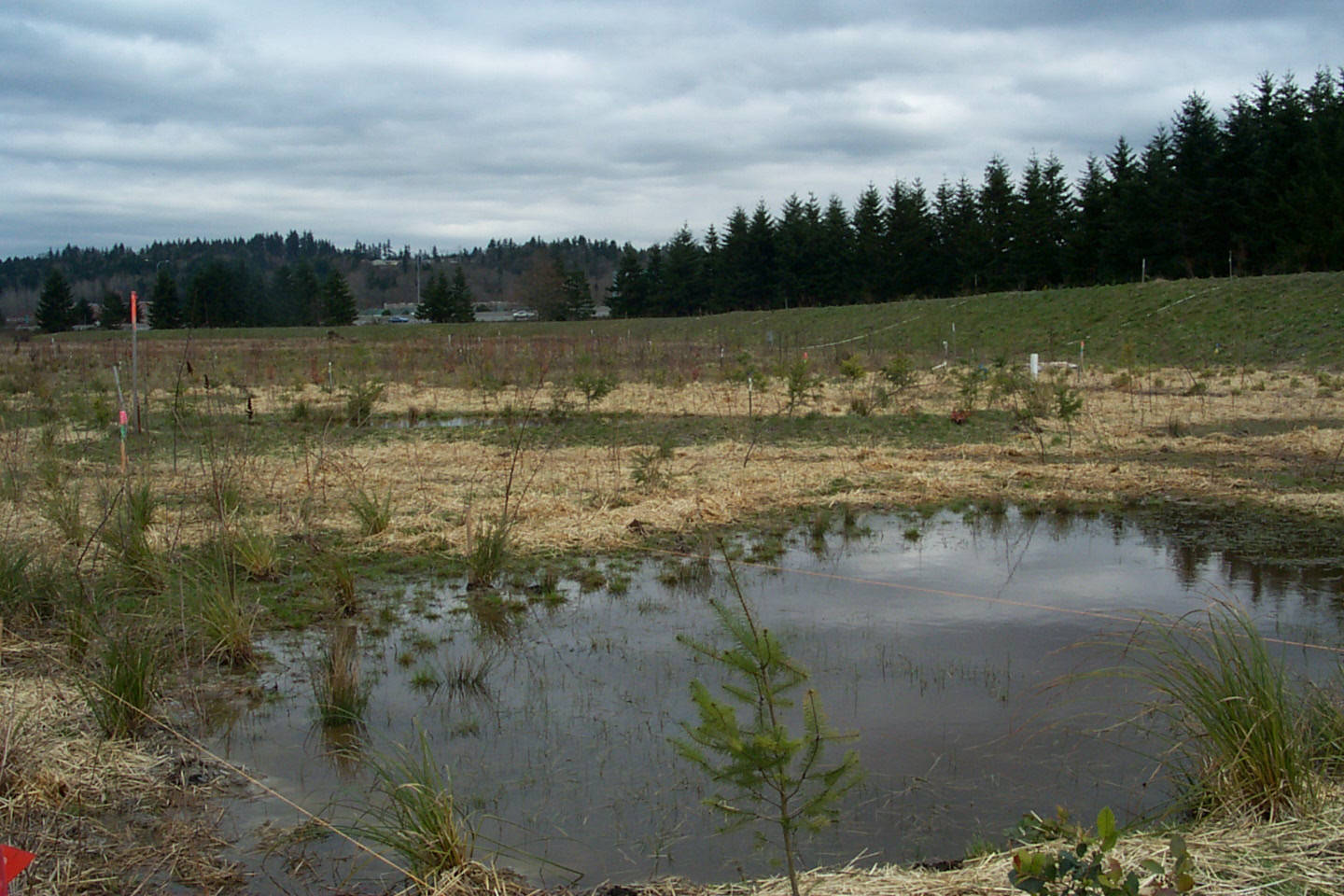
This photo, taken by Warren Gold in March 2001, shows planting work within the Floodplain of North Creek

Planting design considered 261 environmentally distinct areas, called polygons, within the wetland. Between 1998 and 2002, over 100,000 plants were planted. Seven years after initial planting, the Wetland restoration project met its 10-year objectives. The planting design also considered ecological succession in its initial design, expecting the initial plant communities to change through time. According to (UWB), the site will begin to fully function as an ecosystem in another 20 to 30 years.

The restoration design implemented information from the surrounding North Creek Basin hydrology, hydrologic modeling, and the ecological potential of the site. Sizing of the new North Creek channel was conducted by OTAK, with their use of hydrological analysis. The wetland ecological surveying and designing was conducted by L.C. Lee & Associates, Inc.

=== Design goals and objectives ===
The seven targets for channel design of the restoration effort were met:

1. Maximizing channel length
2. Maximizing contact time between water and wetlands
3. Creating secondary high flow channels
4. Placing large wood in-channel to guide channel alignment and morphology
5. Providing for increased peak flows as a result of urbanization of the North Creek watershed
6. Allowing lateral channel movement within design parameters
7. Providing visual access from both the campus and highway corridors.

The project met its environmental regulatory requirements by restoring the structure and functioning of two newly created channels in North Creek. This included reconnecting North Creek with its historical floodplain and restoring 58 acres of the wetland ecosystem.

== Current status ==
=== Current flora and fauna ===
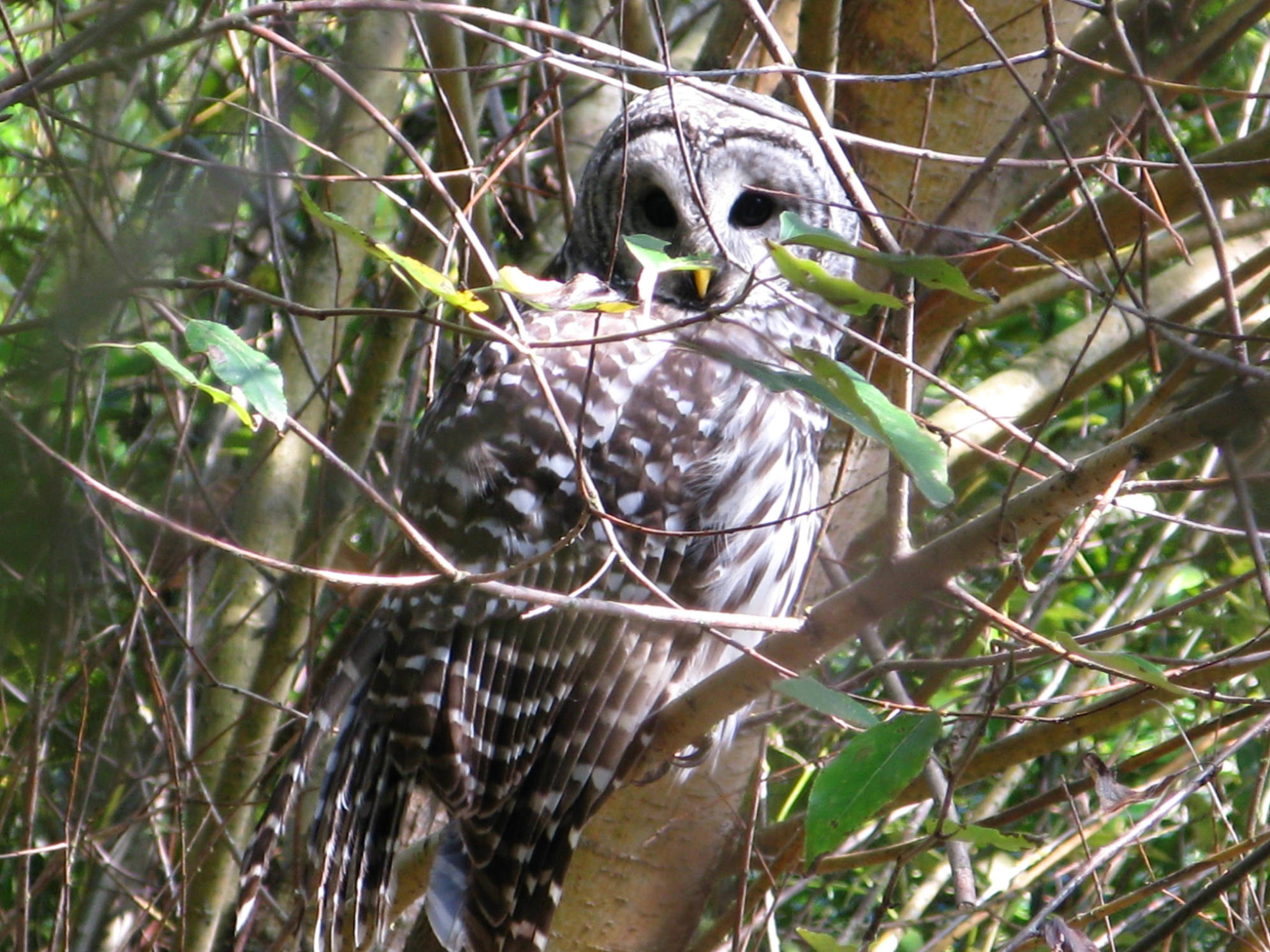
This Barred Owl was photographed in the North Creek Wetlands by UWB / Cascadia College Facilities Services.

Five distinct vegetation communities make up the ecological mosaic of the wetland today. These communities include (i) Evergreen forest types (ii) Floodplain and riparian forest types (iii) Floodplain Scrub-Shrub types (iv) Emergent marsh types and (v) The microdepression community.

Formal and informal monitoring suggests that the abundance and diversity of animal species is increasing. Some common wetland species seen today include the Beaver (Castor canadensis), River Otter (Lutra canadensis). Chinook, Coho, Sockeye and Kokanee salmon species have been observed, as well as Trout and Bass species. The wetland also hosts a variety of reptiles and amphibians, including the Pacific treefrog (Pseudacris regilla), Red-legged frog (Rana aurora), Bullfrog (Rana catesbeiana), Common garter snake (Thamnophis sirtalis), and the Northwestern garter snake (Thamnophis ordinoides).

Bird species are also prevalent in the wetland restoration, common species include Great blue heron (Ardea Herodias), Canada goose (Branta Canadensis), Mallard duck (Anas platyrhynchos), Osprey (Pandion haliaetus), Red-tailed hawk (Buteo jamaincensis), and the American crow (Corvus brachyrhynchos).

=== Maintenance and management ===
Maintenance in the early years of the restoration project involved invasive species removal, trail maintenance, and thinning of brush. Because of the continuous input of invasive plant seeds, as well as the activity of beavers that opens up portions of the site, on-going invasive species removal is still necessary.

To assess whether or not the wetland was reaching its various targets, monitoring plans as permitted by the Clean Water Act were designed. This monitoring also is used as a contingency measure. If unforeseen events impact the restoration function, those events can be measured and accounted for.

Because the UWB Wetland Restoration Project is isolated in an urbanized area, the manual planting of later succession species is required to develop the ecosystem succession through time.

The site design incorporated various ‘environmental features’ including small-scale topographic variation and woody debris (WD) to enhance site diversity. UWB has committed to maintain this biological diversity as site conditions change. According to the university, hydrological changes in North Creek will be managed, “only to the degree that we [UWB] need to do so in order to protect infrastructure”.

=== Education ===
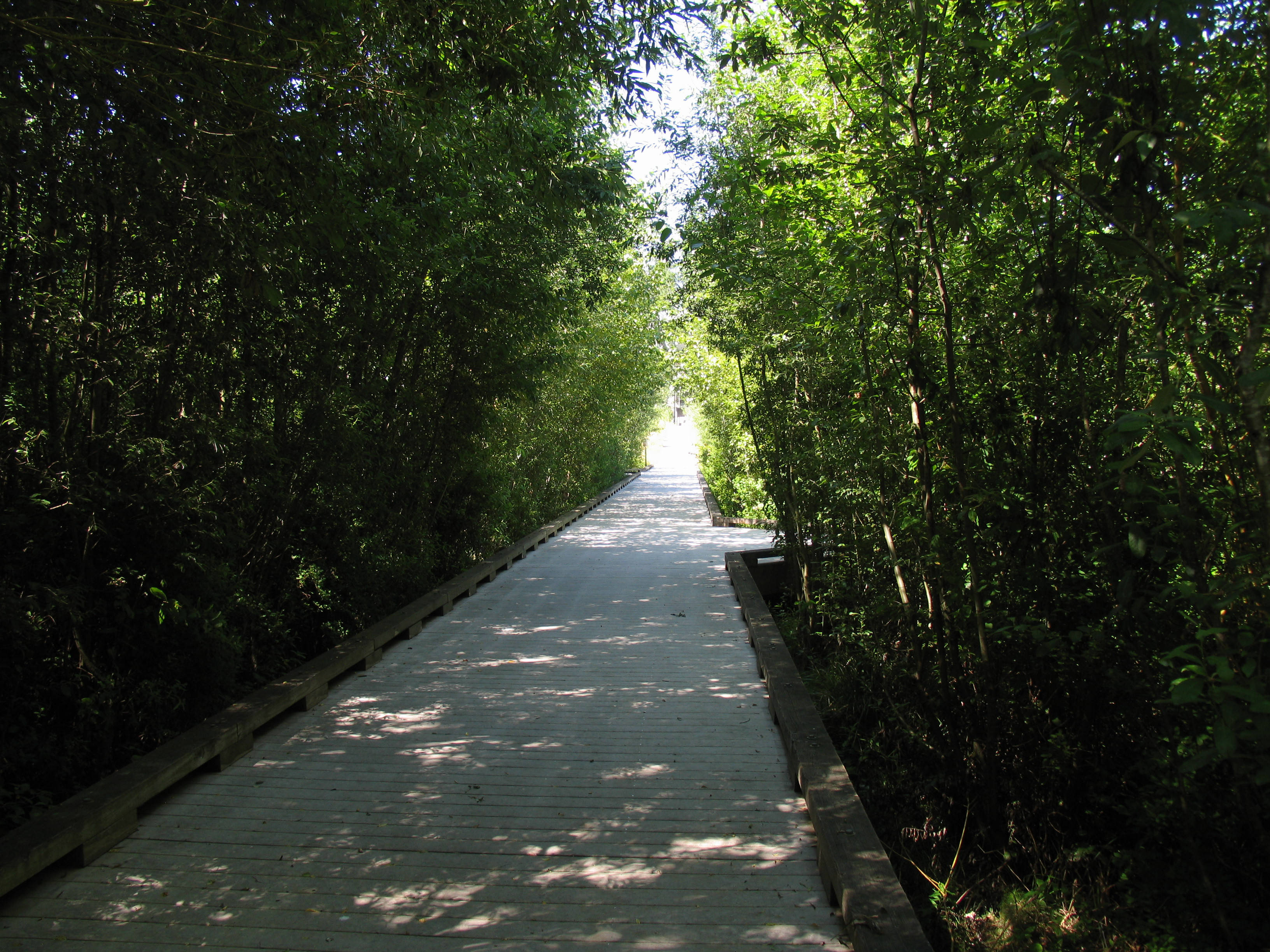
The Wetland boardwalk, photographed by Warren Gold, provides a space for viewing wetland wildlife and North Creek.

Because the Wetland Restoration Project at UWB was one of the largest floodplain restorations in the region, it is an educational resource to researchers and teachers. Over 30 classes, from the CUSP (Center for University Studies and Programs), Interdisciplinary Arts and Sciences, and STEM (Science, Technology, Engineering and Math) Programs at UWB visit the campus wetlands. Research projects have studied bats, crows, stream invertebrates, beaver-plant interaction, and others. Professional education, such as wetland mitigation regulation, is also taught in the wetland, using this restoration as a very successful example. The continued research in the UWB Wetland Restoration Project will afford a basis of information for future research in ecological restoration.

Research in the wetlands allows for the continual monitoring of the restoration growth. UWB encourages students, staff, and other scientists to research the restoration as long as it involves a minimal impact to the wetland ecosystems. Low-impact, observational studies are encouraged in the wetlands, but experimental proposals will be carefully considered, especially the potential impacts of the research. Some research projects that have been conducted in the wetland include:

1. The behavioral study of bats
2. Survey of terrestrial insects
3. Stream macroinvertebrates as measures of stream health in North Creek
4. The impacts of beaver activity on canopy development
5. The impacts of tent caterpillar outbreaks on the pace and trajectory of ecological restoration
6. Water quality of floodplain depressions thorough time and space – and links to the water quality of North Creek

Water quality

Fecal Coliform Bacteria (FCB), including E. coli, in North Creek tributaries has been monitored by the City of Bothell. In 2010, the City developed a ‘Bacteria Pollution Control Plan’ which involving picking up pet waste in effort to reduce Fecal Coliform Bacteria in surface waters. A study conducted later concluded that the source of Fecal Coliform Bacteria in North Creek tributaries is diffuse, or spread out. FCB that originates from sources within the wetland, such as waterfowl, are considered to be the ‘background’ levels and according to The DOE, “will not be addressed by water cleanup activities associated with [TMDL]”.

=== Challenges ===
Both point and non-point pollution affects North Creek. Combined Sewer Overflow events influence Fecal Coliform Bacteria and E. coli concentrations in North Creek. National Pollutant Discharge Elimination System (NPDES) permits are issued to deal with known point sources, while non-point sources including poor land management, leaky septic systems, exist undealt with. Urban stormwater likely contains FCB from pet waste as well. The high levels of FCB in North Creek limit its use for recreation, while low dissolved oxygen levels negatively affect salmonid spawning.
