= Miranda Easten =

New Zealand country musician

Miranda Easten is a country music singer-songwriter from New Zealand.

Easten was born and raised in Christchurch, New Zealand. Her first experience with singing and performing was at Christchurch School of Music before studying Contemporary Music & Performance at Ara Institute of Canterbury Music Arts in Christchurch. She also studied Artist & Development at SOLE Music Academy in Christchurch suburb of Addington, where she was mentored by Sacha Vee.

In 2014, Easten formed the band The Manuka Set with New Zealand singer-songwriter Vanessa Kelly. She later recorded her debut studio album at Neil Finn’s Roundhead Studios in Auckland, executive produced by Welsh producer Greg Haver and featuring New Zealand band Tiny Ruins to be released in late 2020. Easten's single, "Cowboy Lullaby", reached No. 16 on the Australian Official Top 40 Country Music Chart.

In addition to recording her own album, Easten has served as executive producer for L.A.-based musician Greg Johnson’s album Swing the Lantern. She was also a semi-finalist in the 2020 Unsigned Only Music Competition.
