= Gyro (magazine) =

Student magazine of Otago Polytechnic, New Zealand

- Editor: Mark Baxter (technical editor)
- Former editors: Dave Strydom
- Categories: Student magazine
- Frequency: Weekly
- Company: Otago Polytechnic Students' Association
- Country: New Zealand
- Language: English
- Website: http://opsa.org.nz/home/news/studentnews

Gyro was the official publication of its owners the Otago Polytechnic Students' Association (OPSA) at Otago Polytechnic in Otago, New Zealand. Gyro is a member of the Aotearoa Student Press Association (ASPA), and was the first polytechnic publication to fully join.

Gyro was replaced with a weekly digital news-letter style publication, StudentNews in 2014. Previously Gyro was printed fortnightly and covered news, features, regular columns, and reviews. Printed copies were available free of charge around the Dunedin North and Central Otago campus areas, and selected sites in Dunedin city. Archive copies are held at Dunedin's Hocken Collections, which is run by the University of Otago.

Gyro traces its history back to the 1960s photocopied SAM (Students' Association Magazine), and was known as Kram, and Student Informer during the '70s, Informer and Pinch in the '80s, and Tech Torque during the '90s, until its re-branding as "gYRo" in the late 1990s ("Gyro" as of 2007). Gyro was published as a newsprint magazine during the late 1990s and as a glossy magazine in the late 2000s. Since 2011 it was published in a Zine format for regular issues, and a glossy for special issues (e.g. Orientation).

Gyro won second "Best Headline" and second "Best Small Publication" at the 2009 ASPA National Awards, second "Best Headline", second "Best Reviewer" and third "Best Columnist" in the 2010 Awards, and first-equal "Best Review", third "Best Original Photography", fourth "Best editorial", and fourth "Best Unpaid News Reporter" in the 2012 awards.
