= OPSA =

OPSA or Opsa may refer to:

- Oklahoma Private School Association
- Otago Polytechnic Students' Association
- OPSA, a branch of the Italian Red Cross that includes some lifeguard duties
- Opsa, a dance from Serbia
