= EFT =

EFT, Eft, or variants may refer to:

== Science and technology ==
- Eft, a juvenile newt
- Ecosystem Functional Type, an ecological concept to characterize ecosystem functioning
- Effective field theory, in physics
- Electrical fast transient, in electrical engineering
- Embedded figures test, in cognitive psychology
- Emotionally focused therapy, in psychotherapy
- Ewing family of tumors, in medicine

== Other uses ==
- École Française de Téhéran, an international school in Iran
- Monroe Municipal Airport (FAA LID: EFT), in Wisconsin, United States
- Electronic funds transfer, in banking
- Emotional Freedom Techniques, in alternative medicine
- Escape from Tarkov, a video game released in 2025
- Evangelical Fellowship of Thailand, a national evangelical alliance

== See also ==
- EFTS (disambiguation)
- Exploration Flight Test-1, a 2014 NASA test flight
