= Polly Harding =

New Zealand radio and television personality

Polly 'PJ' Harding
- Born: 13 August 1990 (age 36); New Zealand
- Presenting career
- Show: The Hits Drive with Matty & PJ
- Station: The Hits
- Style: Host
- Country: New Zealand

Polly Harding (also known as PJ Harding) is a radio broadcaster from New Zealand.

== Biography ==
Harding attended the New Zealand Broadcasting School at Christchurch Polytechnic Institute of Technology (now Ara Institute of Canterbury) in 2009. She began working for radio station ZM in Auckland after graduation, and became a co-host with Matt Ward. In 2015 Harding became co-host of the station's drive show with Jason Hawkins.

In 2018 Harding and Hawkins moved to Melbourne, Australia to co-host the KIIS 101.1 breakfast show, Jase & PJ. In March 2021, she announced that she was leaving the show to return home to New Zealand.

Between 2019 and 2023, Harding hosted a weekly podcast called The PJ Podcast where she spread her knowledge and inspiration for us all to live a more intentional and fulfilled life.

=== Recognition ===
In 2016, Harding's and Hawkins' show was a finalist in the Best Music Non-Breakfast Host or Team category at the New Zealand Radio Awards.

=== Finishing radio ===
In June 2021, Harding resigned from KIIS 101.1 and Jase & PJ to return home to New Zealand.

=== Return to radio ===
In November 2023, it was announced Harding would return to the New Zealand airwaves in 2024. She would be pairing up with Matty McLean to join The Hits for a new-look Drive radio show.

== Personal life ==
In March 2024, Harding married farmer 'Beej' Campbell, the couple were married at their home in Wairarapa, New Zealand. The couple have two children, Charlie born in 2022, Frankie born in 2025.
