= Aoraki Polytechnic =

Coordinates: 44°23′59″S 171°14′49″E

- Academic staff: 158 FTEStaff 2005
- Students: 1910 EFTS (2012)
- Location: Timaru, New Zealand
- Affiliations: Public NZ TEI
- Website: http://www.aoraki.ac.nz/

Aoraki Polytechnic was a public New Zealand tertiary education institution. Aoraki Polytechnic's main campus was based in central Timaru, South Canterbury, South Island. It also had campuses offering a variety of programmes in Ashburton, Oamaru, Christchurch and Dunedin. In March 2016, Aoraki Polytechnic merged with the Christchurch Polytechnic Institute of Technology to form Ara Institute of Canterbury.

In 2015 Aoraki Polytechnic had 1,021 Equivalent Full Time students (EFTS) and approximately 93 Full Time Equivalent (FTE) Academic Staff and 44 FTE Support staff.

== Southern Upload ==
Southern Upload is a television show produced by Aoraki's Film and Television students, which started in 2011.

== Alumni ==
- Sinead Boucher - journalist and chief executive of Stuff Ltd
