= Mark Walton (musician) =

New Zealand clarinetist, saxophonist, composer, arranger, and musical educator

Mark Walton (born 1957) is a New Zealand clarinetist, saxophonist, composer, arranger, and musical educator.

== Early years ==
Walton was born in Christchurch, growing up in a household with no car, no television nor phone for a time. His early education was at Linwood North School before later attending the Christchurch School of Music. Walton continued clarinet studies in New York and London from 1975 to 1984, and, after a brief spell back in New Zealand, he left for Sydney, Australia, in 1985.

== Music career ==
Walton was chair of woodwind at the Sydney Conservatorium of Music for several years before being appointed chair of performance, outreach and communications there, posts he held for nearly 20 years until 2006.

By 2009, Walton was doing double duty between being the musical director of the Christchurch School of Music in New Zealand, and continuing to hold events and workshops for woodwind musicians across Australia.

In January 2012, he taught at the Afghanistan National Institute of Music Winter Academy in Kabul.

== Achievements ==
Walton has established a groundbreaking instrumental music teaching system using video conferencing for young musicians in remote areas of Australia and has set up music programmes in many country areas.

Walton has written, compiled or edited for several different publishers over 200 publications, many of which have become standard woodwind teaching repertoire. Recently Mark has devoted considerable time to the composition of children oriented musical productions, such as Bobby The Musical and Leonard and the Lottery Ticket. He has also recorded numerous solo albums, the most recent being High Spirits 2, a CD of his own compositions.

== Honours ==
In recognition of his work in improving accessibility to music training for remote communities, Walton was awarded the Order of Australia medal in 2005. In January 2021 he returned the OAM because he objected to another award recipient being honoured.
