= Christchurch Polytechnic Institute of Technology =

Tertiary education institute in New Zealand

- Te Mātāpuna o te Mātauraka
- Former name: Christchurch Technical College
- Type: Public
- Active: 1906–2016
- Students: 5,952 EFTS (2012)
- Location: Christchurch, New Zealand; 43.538259°S 172.643189°E
- Campus: Urban
- Website: www.cpit.ac.nz

The Christchurch Polytechnic Institute of Technology (CPIT), formerly the Christchurch Technical College, was an institute of technology in Christchurch, New Zealand. It merged with Aoraki Polytechnic and became Ara Institute of Canterbury in 2016.

CPIT provided full-time and part-time education in technologies and trades. It was the largest polytechnic and institute of technology in the South Island (25,000 students) and one of the leading institutions of its kind in the country.

In New Zealand's ranking, the Performance Based Research Fund, based on the scientific output of all employees, CPIT ranked 4th among all institutes of technology in New Zealand. It offered a comprehensive range of programmes, which covered almost all subject areas. CPIT specialised in Music Arts, Visual Art & Design, Nursing, Applied Management (Business), Engineering, Applied Science, Education, Information Technology, and Architecture. CPIT hosted New Zealand's only school for radio journalism and communication, the New Zealand School of Broadcasting. It had a student population from more than 50 countries.

== Campus ==
CPIT had a centrally located campus within the CBD on Madras Street (Madras Street Campus) just to the south of Cathedral Square in Christchurch, New Zealand. The city campus was located five minutes walk from the city centre. The majority of programmes were taught here. CPIT's Sullivan Avenue campus (CPIT Trades Campus) was on the corner of Sullivan Avenue and Ensors Road Opawa, in southeast Christchurch.

== Alumni ==
- Ben Boyce – television personality
- Clarke Gayford – broadcaster, husband of Jacinda Ardern, 40th Prime Minister of New Zealand
- Polly Harding – broadcaster
- Miriama Kamo – journalist, children's author and television presenter
- Euan Macleod – artist
- Megan Mansell – broadcaster
- Matty McLean – television presenter
- Mike McRoberts – broadcaster
- Deon Swiggs – politician
- Jack Tame – broadcaster
- Sam Wills – performing artist
