= Jase & PJ =

- Other names: Jase & PJ in the Morning
- Genre: Radio show
- Running time: 180 minutes Monday - Friday; 6:00am – 9:00am
- Country of origin: New Zealand
- Language: English
- Home station: KIIS 101.1 Melbourne
- Hosted by: Jason 'Jase' Hawkins; Polly 'PJ' Harding
- Executive producers: Alex Perigo & Caitlin McArthur
- Original release: 8 January 2015 – 23 July 2021
- Audio format: Stereo
- Podcast: Podcast

Jase & PJ also known as Jase & PJ in the Morning was an Australian breakfast radio show hosted by Jason Hawkins and Polly 'PJ' Harding on KIIS 1011 in Melbourne. The show was syndicated in the night-time slot on the KIIS Network following The Kyle and Jackie O Show. A daily podcast of the morning's show was also produced. The show ended in July 2021 when PJ relocated back to her home country, New Zealand.

== History ==
In October 2017, Australian Radio Network announced that Matt Tilley and Meshel Laurie will leave the station at the end of the year and will be replaced by Jason Hawkins and Polly 'PJ' Harding from ZM in New Zealand. The show commenced broadcasting on KIIS 101.1 on 8 January 2018.

Jason Hawkins and Polly 'PJ' Harding moved to Melbourne from New Zealand where they have hosted drive on ZM since 2015. PJ was called PJ rather than Polly on air because there was already a presenter called Polly on ZM's breakfast show (Polly Gillespie). Previously, Hawkins has hosted Labby, Stav & Abby on B105 in Brisbane, worked with Kyle and Jackie O at 2DAY FM and hosted the Hot30 Countdown.

During 2019, Jase & PJ hosted a weekend breakfast show on New Zealand's ZM, which was packaged content from their Melbourne breakfast show, having previously hosted a drive show on the network throughout 2018.

In February 2020, Australian Radio Network announced that they had extended Jason Hawkins and Polly 'PJ' Harding's contract until 2022.

In March 2020, Jase & PJ extended until 10am due to the COVID-19 pandemic for 2 months whilst the country was in lockdown. The show returned to 6am-9am in May.

In September 2020, Harding returned to New Zealand to co-host the show for the remainder of 2020 due to the ongoing COVID-19 pandemic, for family reasons. Harding returned in person on the 11 January 2021.

The show returned on air on the 11 January 2021. It was revealed retired Australian rules footballer Dane Swan would join the show as a regular commentator each Monday in 2021.

In a special podcast released on 15 January 2021 titled "Family Meeting: Someone's leaving" the shows executive producer Alex Perigo announced he would be leaving the show on 19 February and returning to his home country of New Zealand. Caitlin McArthur was announced as the shows executive producer replacing Alex Perigo in February 2021. Prior to joining Australian Radio Network, McArthur was a senior national show producer of Carrie & Tommy at Southern Cross Austereo.

Since the departure of Cameron D'Antone in November 2020, several other team members have made the decision to leave the show including Alex Perigo, Cameron Maurice, Jaxson McLennan, Toni Lodge and most recently co-host Polly Harding.

In March 2021, the Radio Today podcast begun speculating the future of the Jase & PJ radio show outlining its reasons the show may not be renewed at the end of the current contract. Lackluster survey ratings, PJ spending an extended period in New Zealand with her fiancée in 2020 and a recent high turnover of production staff.

On 24 March 2021, Polly Harding announced she has made the difficult decision to leave the Jase & PJ show and Australian Radio Network at the end of June 2021 and return home to New Zealand. Harding returned to New Zealand in April 2021 for the remaining few months and is broadcasting via a local radio station in Masterton.

Harding's final day on air had been scheduled for 25 June 2021. ARN has subsequently announced a delayed due to co-host Jase Hawkins family crisis, with his father Paul undergoing cancer treatment.

On 22 July 2021, Lauren Phillips was officially announced as Harding's replacement. Phillips will join Jase Hawkins to host Jase & Lauren from 9 August 2021. Harding finished on July 23 2021 marking the end of the Jase & PJ show.

== Marathon Broadcasts ==
Jase & PJ completed a number of on-air marathons, including:

- a 51-hour on-air marathon in April 2015 on ZM
- a 52-hour on-air marathon in August 2016 on ZM
- a 53-hour on-air marathon in May 2017 on ZM
- a 56-hour on-air marathon in June 2019 on KIIS 101.1

== Segments ==
- Riddly Diddly Doo: Callers are asked to solve the riddle posed by Jase & PJ.
- Words You Can't Say Friday: Callers attempt to pronounce words they find difficult, hilarity ensues.
- What Are You Cooking?: A caller lists 3 ingredients that feature in a meal that is being prepared, Jase and PJ will attempt to guess what it is.
- Birthday Balls: Jase or PJ will select a birthday month at random from a cage of ‘birthday balls’ in the studio. Listeners who have a birthday within the selected month are then invited to call into the show. Then if a listener has a birthday on the same date that has been drawn they will win the competition. The segment is currently being rested (October 2020).
- 6 o' Honk: The caller attempts to play a song via their car horn. Jase & PJ attempt to guess the song from the honks. If they guess correctly the callers song will be played on air.
- Free Airtime Friday: Every Friday they give callers exactly 9 seconds of free air to plug their business or whatever is going on
- $5K Word Play: A word association game. The caller selects Jase or PJ to play. If Jase or PJ match 5 words specified by the caller from a range of topics the caller wins $5,000.
- Yay or Nay?: Producer Regional Sam poses questions to Jase & PJ prompting a Yay or Nay response. Previously questions were asked by Producer Alex.
- Celeb HQ: PJ provides the morning's celebrity gossip and news throughout the show.
- Weekly Wrap: Every Friday, PJ takes the mic and wraps up the week.
- Epic Tales: Listeners share their epic tales with Jase & PJ, revealing moments that have changed their life.
- Give Us the Facts: The listener gives Jase & PJ a few facts about themselves and they will work out what job they do. e.g. What time do you knock off, what kind of car do you drive and what footwear do you wear at work.

== Podcast ==
The show used to upload four daily podcast episodes which included:

- 2 x Mini: Two segments broadcast from the day's show (usually 5 – 10 minutes in duration).
- Full Show: The full show omitting songs, news and advertisements.
- The Daily Wrap: (also known as the podcast intro). The team record audio after the show and is not broadcast. Each episode includes Jase, PJ and a rotation of on and off air team members. The episodes are routinely over 30 minutes and can be quite chaotic.

Other bonus episodes were released periodically, however they were suspended early 2021.

- Help Me, Rhonda (Sacha and Veggie Boy): Listeners submit questions on a range of topics with each question being asked anonymously by 'Rhonda'. With the announcement of Jaxson departing the team, the Help Me, Rhonda podcast went independent and no longer featured in the Jase and PJ feed from 13 March 2021.
- No Context (Narc and Tonarotti): Audio grabs from Jase and PJ are played without context and discussed, usually with hilarious responses.
- Banana Phone (Producer Alex and Regional Sam): Each episode is devoted to one or two listeners for the team get to know them better. Each guest is able to play Yay or Nay? with a set selection of questions at the end. Alex announced Banana Phone would continue after his resignation with content being provided remotely.

== Team members ==
| Name | Nickname | Role | Years | Notes |
|---|---|---|---|---|
| Jason Hawkins | Jase | Co-host | 2015 - 2021 | Anchor, panel operator of the show. Self appointed morale man. Hung-over Hank is his alter ego. |
| Polly Harding | PJ | Former Co-host | 2015 - 2021 | Has a fur child named Josephine and a fiancé named BJ who is a sheep farmer in New Zealand. PJ is a semi-regular contributor on The House of Wellness television show. Departed 23 July 2021. |
| Caitlin McArthur | Sk8lin | Executive Producer | 2021 | Previously a senior producer with Carrie & Tommy. Joined the team as executive producer on 29 March 2021. |
| Sacha Barbour Gatt | Swinging Sach | Newsreader | 2018 - 2021 | Previously was a field reporter and weekend newsreader for KIIS 106.5 and WSFM. Enjoys an occasional cheeky vape in the news booth. Wife to Shane. Co-host of the Can We Help You? podcast. Joined the team in October 2018. |
| Jane Mackinlay | The Narc | Creative Producer | 2019 - 2021 | Talent booker and an alleged spy for HR. |
| Samuel McGinn | Regional Sam | Producer | 2020 - 2021 | Previously known as "Hot Guy" and was a breakfast presenter at hit93.1 Riverina. Joined the team as a producer on 7 September 2020. |
| Dean Milhe | Dean van Dyke (DVD) | Video Producer | 2021 | Has 101k subscribers on his YouTube channel Twistie3 |
| Jonathan Skewes | Scudda/Scatman | Audio Producer | 2021 | Previously was a breakfast presenter at Magic 93.1. Joined the team in April 2021. |
| Amanda (Mandy) Catalano | Nonna | Audio Producer | 2021 | Previously a music announcer at Fox FM. Host of Inside the Group Chat podcast. Joined the team in May 2021. |
| Jaxson McLennan | Veggie Boy | Audio Producer | 2018 - 2021 | Past band member of Boyracer. Announced his departure on 17 February 2021 to move to the USA. Departed 1 April 2021. |
| Toni Lodge | Tonarotti | Audio Producer | 2018 - 2021 | Had a podcast One Trick Toni. Lady of Glencoe and a land owner in the Scottish highlands. Announced her departure on 17 March 2021. Departed 1 April 2021. |
| Liza Altarejos | Pingers/The Temp | Executive Producer | 2021 | Interim executive producer for 5 weeks. Notably previous EP for Chrissie, Sam & Browny |
| Cameron Maurice | Cam Helloooo | KIIS 101.1 Activations Manager | 2018 - 2021 | Infrequent podcast guest. Departed 19 March 2021. |
| Alex Perigo | Producer Alex | Executive Producer | 2015 - 2021 | Dad of the team. Departed 19 February 2021. |
| Paris Humphrey | Lil' P | Producer | 2019 - 2020 | Departed 28 August 2020 after moving back to Adelaide. |
| Cameron D'Antone | Franco | Video Producer | 2018 - 2020 | Departed 27 November 2020, after moving to Wollongong. |
| Rami Mustafa | Producer Salami | Senior Producer | 2018 - 2019 | Guest and Talent Booker. |
| David Rooney | Deviant Davo | Junior Producer | 2017 - 2019 | Moved internally to a sales position within ARN. |
| Jenna Benson | Je-Neigh | Digital Producer | 2018 - 2019 | Moved to Sydney and joined Jonesy & Amanda show on Gold 101.7. |
| Aleah Espanta | The Mute | Digital Producer | 2018 | Known for never speaking on air. |
| Clare Todhunter | | Newsreader | 2018 | |
| Mike Santos | | Audio Producer | 2018 | |
Guest members
| Ruby McHaffie | | KIIS 101.1 Activations Manager | 2021 | Previously a publicist at Network 10. Started 19 March 2021. |
| Dane Swan | | Commentator | 2021 | Guest commentator each Monday. |
| The Late Paul Hawkins | Jase's Dad | Jase's Dad | 2015 - 2021 | Rest in Peace. |
| Ange Harding | | PJ's Mum | 2015 - 2021 | Refers to PJ as Puddy. |
| Tony Aldridge | Chatty Tony, Teabag. | KIIS 101.1 Content Director | 2019 - 2021 | Occasional guest on the podcast. Known for his catchphrase 'Sweetheart, you got a second'. Loves a chat and a chart. Likely the main the reason for the shows demise. |
