= Nursing Open =

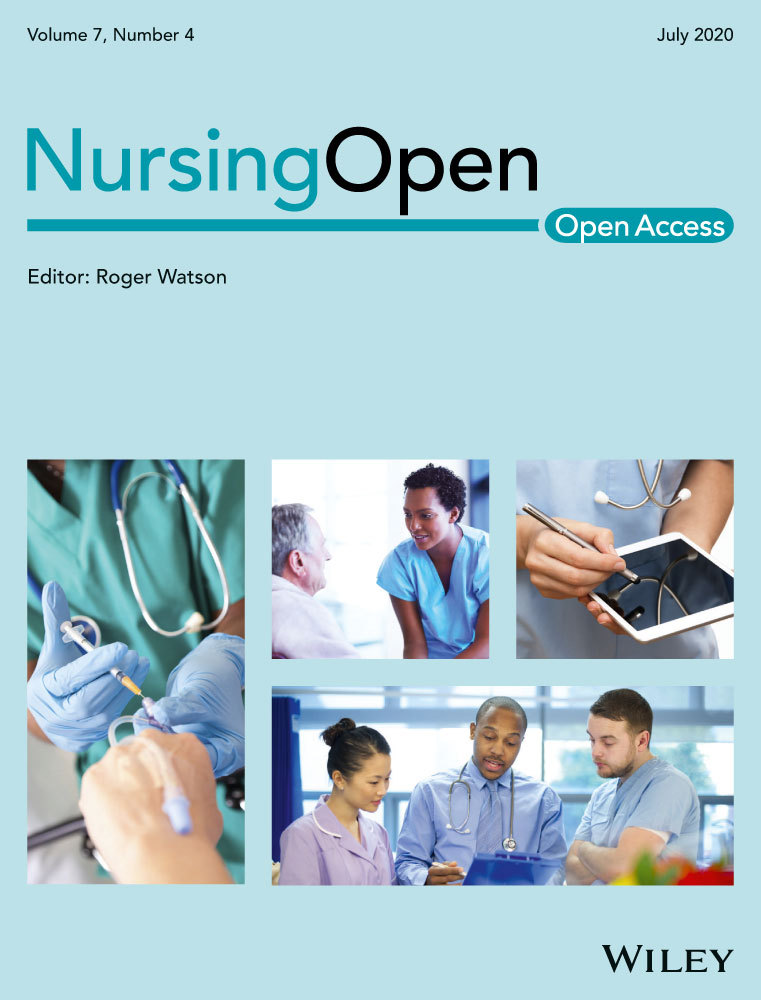
- Discipline: Nursing
- Language: English
- Edited by: Justin Fontenot

Publication details
- History: Since 2014
- Publisher: Wiley
- Frequency: monthly
- Open access: Yes
- License: CC BY
- Impact factor: 2.3 (2024)

Standard abbreviations
- ISO 4: Nurs. Open

Indexing
- ISSN: 2054-1058
- OCLC no.: 904429365

Links
- Journal homepage; Online access; Online archive

Nursing Open is a bimonthly open access peer-reviewed medical journal covering all aspects of nursing. It is published by Wiley.

== History ==
The journal was established in 2014 with Roger Watson as the founding editor-in-chief. The current editor is Justin Fontenot.

== Abstracting and indexing ==
The journal is abstracted and indexed in:

- CINAHL
- Current Contents/Clinical Medicine
- Current Contents/Social and Behavioral Sciences
- Embase
- Index Medicus/MEDLINE/PubMed
- Science Citation Index Expanded
- Scopus
- Social Sciences Citation Index

According to the Journal Citation Reports, the journal has a 2024 impact factor of 2.3.
