= Christchurch School of Music =

Music school in Christchurch, New Zealand

Coordinates: 43°32′16″S 172°38′46″E

The Christchurch School of Music | Te Kura Puoro (CSM) formerly the Christchurch School of Instrumental Music (CSIM), is a community music education organization based in Christchurch, New Zealand.

The school was founded in 1955 by Robert Perks to provide musical education to primary school children. The CSM now provides lessons for people of all ages, and for a large range of orchestral, electric and other instruments. The CSM provides musical education to the people of Christchurch, and the wider Canterbury province, through individual tuition and a range of performance groups. These groups include the Junior Symphony Orchestra, Intermediate Symphony Orchestra, Sinfonia Orchestra, and the CSM's top orchestra, the Christchurch Youth Orchestra. The School also offers performance groups such as concert bands, wind ensembles, recorder ensembles, rock and jazz bands, string ensembles and percussion ensembles. The ages served range from babies through to seniors and music lessons can be in groups or individually.

== History ==
CSM originated as an instrumental group of primary school children established under the auspices of the Christchurch Primary Schools’ Music Festival. The children received tuition in orchestral instruments and in playing together on Saturdays. They gave their first performance at the Festival in August 1955. The scheme continued through the Music Festival Association and then the Christchurch Schools’ Music Association, growing from about 400 enrolments by 1961.

In 1961, the scheme adopted the name, the School of Instrumental Music. By 26 August 1964 with enrolments at about 800, the Christchurch School of Instrumental Music Incorporated was registered (and later again in 2008). The organisation’s inaugural meeting as an incorporated school was held on 6 May 1965, when its first President, Dr Walter S Metcalf was elected along with Vice President, Mr M G L Loughnan, and honorary vice presidents, Dr Vernon Griffiths and the Chairman of the Canterbury Education Board.

The first Music Director, Robert Perks introduced a range of innovations from the beginning. Building on the work of Professor (then Dr) Vernon Griffiths, he established a strong Saturday morning programme which grew from 158 students in its first year of 1955, to over 1000 by 1968. The school started classes using the Suzuki method of instrumental instruction in 1966. These classes continue to the present, running continuously for at least 60 years.

The School announced it was introducing choral music to complement the core instrumental music in 1986, and in 1992, the organisation changed its name from the Christchurch School of Instrumental Music to the Christchurch School of Music, reflecting the addition of vocal and choral programmes and a wider range of activities beyond instrumental tuition. By 1994, press material described the school as including seven orchestras, the Christchurch Youth Orchestra, junior and senior symphonic bands, jazz, brass and wind ensembles, recorder groups, chamber music, theory and aural classes, junior and senior choirs, pre-school classes and adult classes.

=== Music Directors ===
The Music Directors of the Christchurch School of Music have provided the artistic, educational and organisational leadership that has carried the school from its founding as the Christchurch School of Instrumental Music through to its present-day role as a broad community music organisation. Each director has inherited both the practical demands of a large teaching programme and the deeper responsibility of sustaining CSM’s ensemble-based culture: encouraging beginners, supporting tutors, shaping orchestras and groups, and keeping the school connected to the musical life of Christchurch.

Music Directors of the CSM include Robert Perks MBE, Frank E. Dennis, Peter Zwartz, John Emeleus, Phillip Norman CNZM, Graeme Wallis, Mark Walton, Alastair Sands, Neville Forsythe, Stephen Nichols, and Celia Stewart MNZM.

=== Annual Demonstration Concerts ===
School ran large annual demonstration concerts for many years in which beginners, graded orchestras, recorder and wind ensembles, choirs, bands and the Christchurch Youth Orchestra appeared in a carefully staged progression from first-year players to the school’s most advanced musicians, often ending with a massed finale. The scale could be extraordinary: about 950 instrumentalists took part in 1967, almost all 1,100 pupils in 1969, more than 1,000 performers in 1985, and most of the school’s 1,200 students in 1988. The concerts demanded major logistical organisation but gave hundreds of young musicians public-performance experience and allowed families to see the school’s full teaching pathway in one evening.

== Christchurch Youth Orchestra ==
The Christchurch Youth Orchestra (CYO) is CSM’s senior or flagship orchestra. The ensemble developed from the school’s top-level graded orchestra, known at different times as Orchestra No. 1 and the [CSIM] Symphony Orchestra; the Christchurch Youth Orchestra name was in public use by 1960, and achieved some prominence in its own right by 1972. Conductors associated with the orchestra have included Robert Perks, Alan Foster, Louis Yffer, Vanco Cavdarski, Peter Zwartz, John Young, Paul Mayhew, Brian Buggy, Gemma New, Luke Di Somma, Helen Renaud, Naomi Hnat and Grant Bartley. Over the years, most of these Music Directors have had various roles with the city's professional orchestra, the Christchurch Symphony Orchestra.

Touring has long formed part of the orchestra’s programme. Documented trips include Timaru in 1974, an Australian tour in 1993, later Australian tours in 2007, 2010, and 2014. They also did New Zealand regional tours to the North Island of New Zealand, Stewart Island in 2008 and Mount Cook in 2009. The Stewart Island visit included a concert at the island’s Community Centre on 9 December 2008, reported as the first performance there by a full symphony orchestra.
