= Otago Polytechnic Students' Association =

Otago Polytechnic Students' Association is an independent organisation founded in the 1960s for Otago Polytechnic students.

== History ==
OPSA was created two years before the 1966 opening of Otago Polytechnic. King Edward Technical College set up the Polytechnic Full-time Students' Association in 1964 to organise social and sporting activities for full-time tertiary students in anticipation of King Edward Technical's split into Otago Polytechnic and Logan Park High School. Membership was initially compulsory for all full-time students.

The Association's name was changed to the Otago Polytechnic Students' Association in 1968. OPSA became an incorporated society in 1976, officially a not-profit making organisation in 1986, and was awarded charitable status in 1994.

OPSA was a founding member of NZTISA, the national student body of polytechnics and technical institutions, in 1971. During the 1970s OPSA expanded into the role of student representation and campaigning for student rights.

Since 2011 membership of New Zealand students' associations was made voluntary by the government, at Otago Polytechnic any enrolled OP student may consider themselves a member. OPSA's income is largely from a service contract with the Polytechnic.

OPSA campaigned against the Government's removal of student representation from polytechnic councils in 2009.

In 2008 and 2009 OPSA took the unusual move of threatening to expel any members involved in illegal violence at the Undie 500.

== Services ==
OPSA provides support services like advocacy, campaigns, representation, financial assistance, and advice. OPSA is often involved with local authorities representing a student view, especially in transportation and housing issues.
