= Ara Institute of Canterbury =

New Zealand tertiary organisation

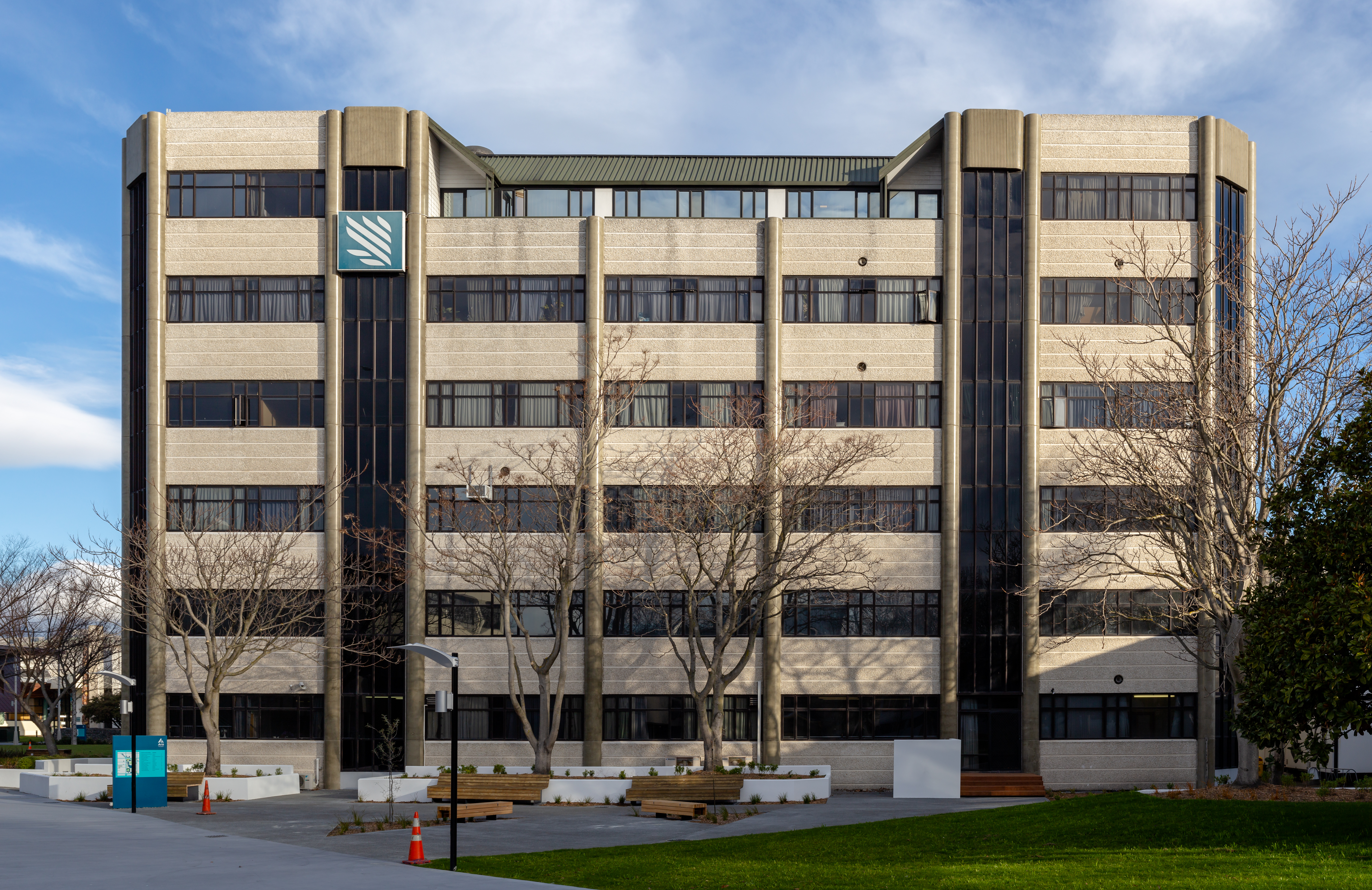
- Former names: Christchurch Polytechnic Institute of Technology, CPIT, Christchurch Technical College, Aoraki Polytechnic
- Motto: Ara rau, taumata rau
- Motto in English: Many pathways, many opportunities
- Type: Public
- Established: 2016
- Students: 6290 EFTS (2023)
- Location: Christchurch, New Zealand; 43.538259°S 172.643189°E
- Campus: Urban
- Website: www.ara.ac.nz

Ara Institute of Canterbury, often simply referred to as Ara, is an institute of technology in Canterbury, New Zealand. It was formed in 2016 from the merger of Christchurch Polytechnic Institute of Technology (CPIT) and Aoraki Polytechnic.

== Curriculum and programs ==
Ara specialises in applied tertiary training. Subject choices include business, engineering, architecture, nursing, creative arts, hospitality, sport, nutrition, health promotion, computing, science, languages, outdoor education, and broadcasting. Programmes range from Level 1 to Level 9. The institute works closely with industry to ensure students have relevant skills for employment, and have a wide range of work placement opportunities.

Each year around 14,000 students enrol at Ara, including many international students. Ara is internationally recognised and has one of the best English language training centres in New Zealand. Over 50 countries are represented among staff and students at Ara.

== History ==
Previously known as CPIT or Christchurch Polytech, Ara was created in 2016 when CPIT and Aoraki Polytechnic merged. Ara is the Māori word for path or journey.

On 1 April 2020, Ara became a subsidiary of Te Pūkenga (the New Zealand Institute of Skills and Technology) alongside the 15 other institutes of technology and polytechnics (ITPs) in the country.

In July 2025, the Vocational Education Minister Penny Simmonds announced that the Government would return Ara Institute and nine other polytechnics to regional governance by 1 January 2026.

On 1 January 2026, Ara Institute exited the mega polytechnic to become an independent entity again. In mid-February 2026, the Government allocated NZ$80.8 million to Te Ara to cover the polytechnic's spending expenditures for the first three months of the transition period.

== Campus ==
Ara has six campuses in Canterbury and North Otago (three in Christchurch and one each in Ashburton, Timaru and Oamaru), making it the largest tertiary institute in the South Island.

=== Buildings on the City campus, Madras Street, Christchurch ===
- Kahukura – This block built for architecture and engineering studies was completed in June 2017 and is named after the Māori for a chief's cloak.
- Te Kei – This two-storey building housing executive and administrative staff was completed in 2018 and is named after the Māori for the bow of the canoe.
- Te Puna Wānaka – This is the centre for Māori, Pacific and indigenous studies which was built in 1996. A year long refurbishment to address damage caused by the 2011 Christchurch earthquake was completed for its reopening on 7 July 2021.

== Faculty and alumni ==
- Miranda Easten – country music singer-songwriter
- Cathy Andrew - Nurse and Nursing Academic
- Amanda Murphy - Rugby Union Black Fern and Strength and Conditioning Coach
- James Sandilands - Olympic Sport Performance Coach (Athletics)
