= Plant functional type =

Plant functional types (PFTs) refer to a grouping or classification system often used by ecologists and climatologists to classify plant species based on their similar functions and performances in an ecosystem. It is a way to simplify the complexity of plant diversity and behaviour in ecological models by grouping plants into categories that share common functional characteristics. This simplification helps researchers model vegetation dynamics which can be used in land use studies and climate models.

PFTs provide a finer level of modeling than biomes, which represent gross areas such as desert, savannah, deciduous forest. In creating models with PFTs, areas as small as 1 km^{2} are modeled by defining the predominant plant type for that area, interpreted from satellite data or other means. For each plant functional type, a number of key parameters are defined, such as fecundity, competitiveness, resorption (rate at which plant decays and returns nutrients to the soil after death), etc. The value of each parameter is determined or inferred from observable characteristics such as plant height, leaf area, etc.

PFT models have some limitations and problems. For example, it is difficult for climatologists and ecologists to determine which minimal set of plant characteristics best models the actual responses of the biosphere in response to climate changes. Furthermore, by oversimplifying species to a few key traits, researchers may not capture the full diversity and variability of plant species within a given ecosystem or represent rare or unique species. As such, researchers are developing more sophisticated models, such as trait-based models, to address these problems.

== See also ==
- Ecotone
