= EFTS =

Equivalent Full Time Student

EFTS is an acronym for Equivalent Full Time Student. It is a definition used to measure student numbers at New Zealand educational institutions. One EFTS will be made up of more than one part-time students (e.g. two half time students).

== Uses in funding education ==
EFTS are primarily used within New Zealand's tertiary education sector to make funding decisions. Each course or paper that a student may enrol in is given an EFTS rating, indicating how much of a full-time course of study a particular course or paper is expected to require. The education institution is then funded based on the total number of EFTS that students enrol in.

An individual student's eligibility for student loans and allowances also depends on the number of EFTS that they have enrolled for, or previously passed. Students enrolling in courses that total more than 0.8 EFTS in any one year are generally considered to be full-time students. For full-time, part year courses there is corresponding lower full-time EFTS values. Full-time students are eligible for loans and allowances to pay for living costs. Part-time students enrolled in more than 0.25 EFTS in a year can qualify for loans for the tuition fees, though not living costs. Other criteria also apply sometimes, so students with EFTS less than these limits may also qualify in special circumstances.

== See also ==
- Full-time equivalent
