= Robert Logan Sr. =

Scottish boat builder (1837–1919)

Robert Logan Senior (1837–1919) was a boat builder and the founder of the Logan boat building and boat designing dynasty.

== Early life ==
He was born in Dumbarton, Scotland, in 1837, and was educated in Glasgow. By the early 1870s Robert was foreman of a boat-building firm of Robert Steele & Co in Greenock on the River Clyde. During this time he received a commission from his older brother James who had emigrated to New Zealand in 1864 and was now based in Auckland. He was to build a small steamer, named the Eclipse, for the service from Auckland to Riverhead at the head of the Waitematā Harbour and have it shipped there from Glasgow.

== Emigration to New Zealand ==
Subsequently, Robert Logan decided to join his brother and together with his family emigrated to New Zealand, arriving in Auckland on the Zealandia on 15 October 1874. The family settled in Devonport, where he obtained a position at the Niccol boat building firm.

In 1878 he set up in business as a boat builder in Devonport, close to what was then called the Flagstaff Wharf. Initially business was difficult, specially as he had a large family to support.

In 1879 he received a commission from Arch Buchanan for the 20 ft yacht Lala for his son. Later that year Buchanan also ordered a second yacht called Lala II for himself, with which he hoped to win the Second Class race in the Auckland Anniversary Regatta. Logan decided to simultaneously build a second yacht as a private venture to show what he could do. He named it Jessie Logan after one of his daughters. The performance of Lala II and in particular that of Jessie Logan which finished second and first respectively in the Auckland Anniversary Regatta following their launch established Logan's reputation. However orders were still slow due to the economic downturn at the time and Logan was forced to sell Jessie Logan via a raffle, known at the time as an Art Union. Eventually however more orders were placed and the business prospered. As his sons came of age many joined him in his business. In approximately 1890 Archibald and Robert left to set up in business as R. & A. Logan. In 1892 they were joined by their brother John, and the firm became known as Logan Brothers. By this time Logan, his sons and the Bailey boat building family were the dominant yacht building enterprises in New Zealand. This dominance was to last until the 1930s.

In 1895 Logan Senior transferred his boat-building business to the south side of Waitematā Harbour. By 1900 Logan had a shed 120 feet long by 50 feet wide which enabled him to build vessels under cover up to 120 feet long.

Based on his experiences in building lifeboats on the Clyde, he pioneered the use of frameless diagonally planked two and three-skinned boats in New Zealand. This method of construction consisted of two thinner layers of planks that were diagonal to each other (fastened with galvanised nails) and a third skin of planks (fastened with copper nails) running horizontally fore and aft along the yacht. When combined with the use of the locally grown kauri Agathis australis the resulting hulls were extraordinarily long-lived, being highly resistant to rot and damage.

Besides yachts he also designed and built the coastal steamers: P.S. Birkenhead, S.S. Kapanui (1908), S.S. Kawaii (1899), S.S. Kotiti, (1898), S.S. Neptune (1883), Taniwha' (1898) and Waimarie (1896).

An unusual project was the design and construction of the royal barge Vuna for the King of Tonga.

Logan died in 1919.

== Personal life ==
He married Margaret McLay. They had eight children, among them Archibald (known as Arch), Robert, John, Jim (who became a carpenter), Jack (who died young) and Jessie. His sons Archibald, Robert and John formed the very successful Logan Brothers boat building company while Archibald Logan was a very successful yacht designer.

== Notable boats ==
=== Jessie Logan ===
She was built in his Devonport waterfront yard by Robert Logan Senior in December 1879-January 1880 and was launched on 24 January 1880 to take part in the Auckland Anniversary Regatta Second Class race on 29 January 1880. Robert Logan Senior designed her and owned her during her first season. For the next nine seasons she proved to be unbeatable in her class except when the rules were changed to allow much bigger yachts into her class.

She was built as a radical for the time 28 ft 6in (12.34m) LOA. centreboarder of two skins of kauri, laminated in diagonal fashion and built without frames in a form of construction that became standard for New Zealand yacht builders for two generations after Jessie Logan.

=== Daisy ===
Built in 1880 for S. Holland.

=== Maggie ===
Built in 1881 for Walter Jones.

=== Christina ===
Built in 1881 for W. Williams.

=== Merry Duchess ===
Launched in February 1884. This yacht was designed and built by Logan for a Mr Brooke of Waiwera. This sailing yacht was unusual at the time in having a canoe stern. She was later converted into a launch.

=== Akarana ===
Launched in 1888, Akarana was a keel cutter with a LOA of 39 ft (11.88 m) was designed and built by Logan as a spec project with the hope of successfully completing in the Australian Centennial Regatta. The boat building market in New Zealand was in a downturn as the country was in the grip of a depression, and Logan hoped than success in completion would not only allow him to sell her in Australia, but would also lead to commissions from that country.

=== Laurina ===
Launched in November 1888. This keel fishing yacht was designed and built for Frank Williams. In 1893 she was renamed Mohican II by her new owner James Slator but later reverted to her original name.

=== Moana ===
This yacht was designed and built in late 1890 by Logan for W.R. Wilson and F.R. Wilson. The same individuals commissioned another yacht of the same name in 1895 from Logan Brothers.

=== Rona ===
Rona (1892) was designed by George Lennox Watson for Wellington merchant and benefactor Alexander Horsburgh Turnbull.

=== Aorere ===
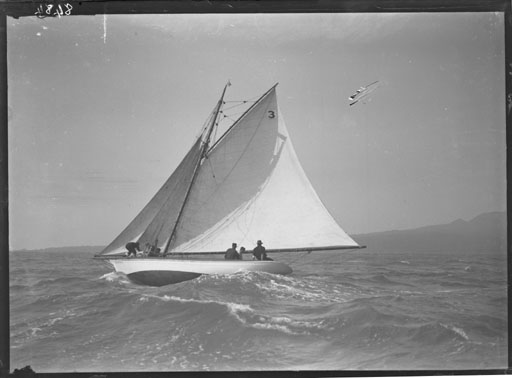
The Aorere photographed in 1911

Launched on 26 November 1892. This yacht was designed and built by Logan for Tom Kilfoyle.

=== Waitangi ===
This gaff rigged cutter was built using a frameless 3 directional kauri timber construction. 58 ft (17.67m) LOA. Ordered by a Wellington syndicate consisting of Sydney Winstanley, J David M Georgeson, James (Jas) Jamieson, William Waters and Thomas Kirker with the object of winning the New Zealand First class Championship. The contract which was signed on 21 April 1894 called for payment of £500. comprising £300 in cash and the rest in trade on the syndicates existing yacht. Payment would only be made upon the yacht being sailed down to Wellington and winning the coveted championship. Logan launched the yacht on 13 December 1894, sailed her from Auckland to Wellington in 6 days 18 hours. Not only did Logan subsequently win the championship but he also won the £100 prize money.

=== Vixen ===
Built 1895. Designed by R. J. Scott.

=== Rarere ===
Built 1895. This yacht was designed and built by Logan for the Harvey brothers.

=== Miru ===
Built 1895 Designed by William Fife. Sister to Ruru.

=== Ruru ===
Built 1895. Designed by William Fife. Sister to Miru.

== Bibliography ==
- Elliot, Robin; Kidd, Harold (2001). The Logans: New Zealand's Greatest Boat Building Family (Paperback). Auckland: David Ling Publishing Ltd. ISBN 978-0-90899-075-7.
- Elliot, Robin; Kidd, Harold; Pardon, David (1999). Southern Breeze - A History of Yachting in New Zealand (Hardback). Auckland: Penguin Books. ISBN 0-670-88650-5.
- Holmes, Noel (1971). Century of Sail - Official History of the Royal New Zealand Yacht Squadron (Hardback). Wellington: Whitcombe and Tombs. ISBN 0-7233-0305-3.
- Titchener, Paul (1978). Little Ships of New Zealand (Hardback). Wellington: A.H & A.W. Reed. ISBN 0-589-01068-9.
- Wilkins, Ivor (2010). Classic - The Revival of Classic Boating in New Zealand (Hardback). Auckland: Random House. ISBN 978-1-86962-162-9.
