= Henry Winkelmann =

New Zealand photographer (born 1860)

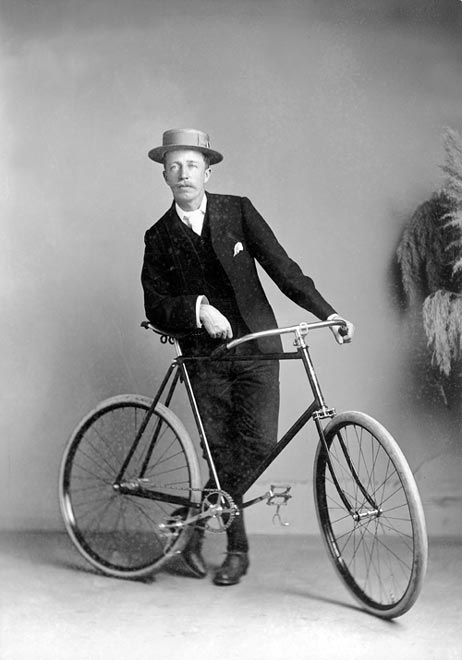
- Photograph of Winkelmann in 1896 taken by William Henry Macey
- Born: 26 September 1860; Bradford, England
- Died: 5 July 1931 (aged 70); Auckland, New Zealand
- Occupation: Photographer

Henry Winkelmann (26 September 1860 – 5 July 1931) was a New Zealand photographer. Winkelmann's photographs covered a wide range of topics, but he is best known for his yachting photographs.

== Early years ==
Henry Winkelmann was born at 8 Melbourne Place, Bradford, Yorkshire, England on 26 September 1860, one of eight children of Peter Winkelmann, a stuff and yarn merchant, and Louise Schüller, German immigrants to the United Kingdom. He grew up at Follingworth House in Gomersal, where his family moved to in 1865. He may have attended school in Doncaster and Neuwied, Germany. A musical child, Winkelmann learnt how to play the piano, organ and the zither.

His older brother, Charles, immigrated to New Zealand in 1875, where he first became a schoolteacher, then a chemist and later a photographer. After Charles had emigrated, Henry took over many family responsibilities. The family moved twice during this period, first to Carlton Hall in Bramley then to Selbourne Grove in Manningham, where Winkelmann's father died in 1877.

In July 1878, Henry left England aboard the Calypso, following his brother to New Zealand, arriving at Port Chalmers in Dunedin in October. His mother, Louise, and five sisters followed him to New Zealand in the mid-1880s.

== Jarvis Island ==
By 1881 after travelling the country, Winkelmann was living in a boarding house in Hobson Street, Auckland. He and fellow boarder Harold Willey Hudson, were hired by businessman Thomas Henderson to claim uninhabited Jarvis Island, a location valued for its guano, attempting to secure the island for a period of at least three months. Leaving on the schooner Sunbeam in June 1881, arriving in August, the pair spent a total of eight months stranded and isolated on the island, during which Winkelmann began sketching as a hobby.

== Bank clerk and Great Barrier Island farming ==
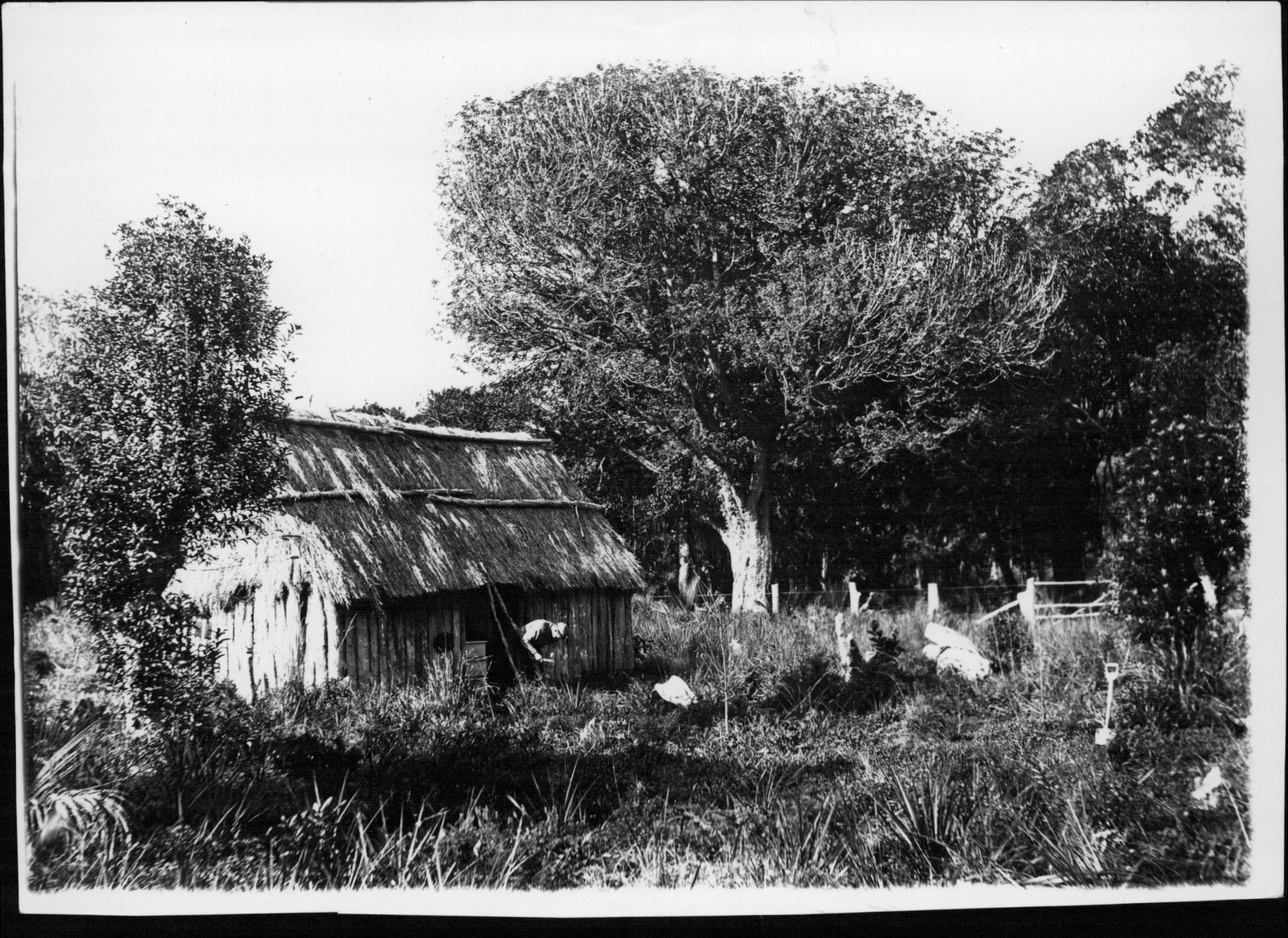
View of Winkelmann's property Ti Tree Flat near Medlands Beach on Great Barrier Island in July 1892.

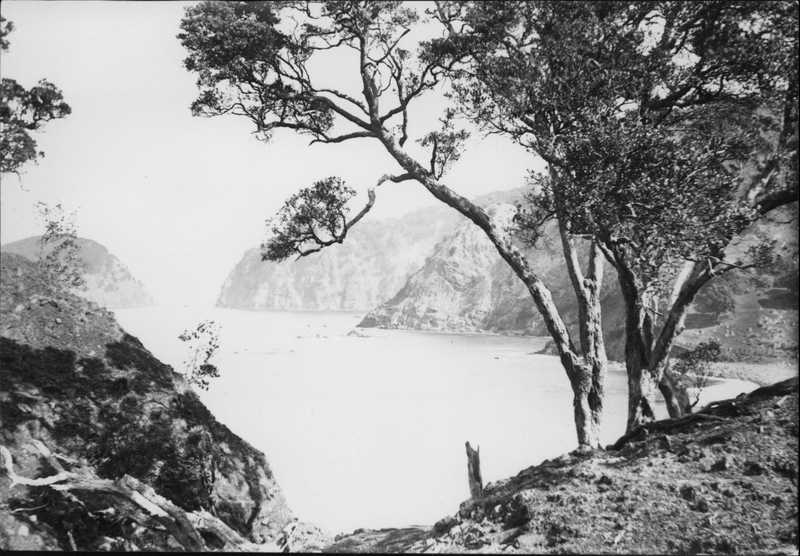
View of Rosalie Bay near Winkelmann's property on Great Barrier Island in 1895. This photograph won Winkelmann's first award in a photographic competition in the New Zealand Graphic.

In November 1882, Winkelmann joined the Bank of New Zealand. He began work at the Wellington branch, before moving to the Levuka, Fiji branch from November 1883, returning to New Zealand in July 1886, after which he worked at the Queen Street branch. While in Fiji, Winkelmann's mother and sisters migrated to New Zealand. Winkelmann was based in Christchurch from April 1887 to July 1888, and at Sydney from late 1889 to April 1891, and Wellington from November 1894.

Winkelmann first purchased property on Great Barrier Island in the early 1880s. In November 1888, he purchased 200 acres (81 ha) of land near Medlands Beach, which he called Ti Tree Flat, and established an orchard at the location. In January 1895, Winkelmann and his colleague Richard Cecil Moorsom Harrington resigned from the ban, purchasing 952 acres (385 ha) of land at Rosalie Bay, which they called the Rosalie Bay Estate. Later that year, Winkelmann decided to leave Great Barrier Island due to the financial disaster of the farming enterprise, with Harrington remaining to continue farming. Winkelmann asked to be reinstated at the bank, and was placed in Blenheim, where he worked until 1897, returning to Auckland after hearing of his mother's death.

Winkelmann supplemented his income by teaching the zither and performing in concerts; with Mrs. Buckland of Highwic being among his clients. Winkelmann also began making money from photography, after purchasing a Lancaster Instantograph camera in April 1892. He likely set up a darkroom in his mother's house called Claremont at 14 Dock Street (now Huia Street), Devonport, where the family moved to in 1892. In 1895, Winkelmann won a second prize in the New Zealand Graphic photographic competition, for a photograph Winkelmann took of Rosalie Bay. His interests in yachting began in 1893 after meeting the Horton brothers, who owned the yacht Tawera. Winkelmann would accompany the family on their cruises, and began taking photographs of watercraft during this period.

On return, Winkelmann worked as an agent for the S. S. Kawau, sold insurance for the Magdeberg Insurance Company, and in 1898 joined the Coastal Steamship Company, working as the secretary and managed the S. S. Kotiti. In early 1900, Winkelmann's brother-in-law Charles Fox had died, leaving Winkelmann's sister a widow, needing to take care of their three boys.

== Photography business ==
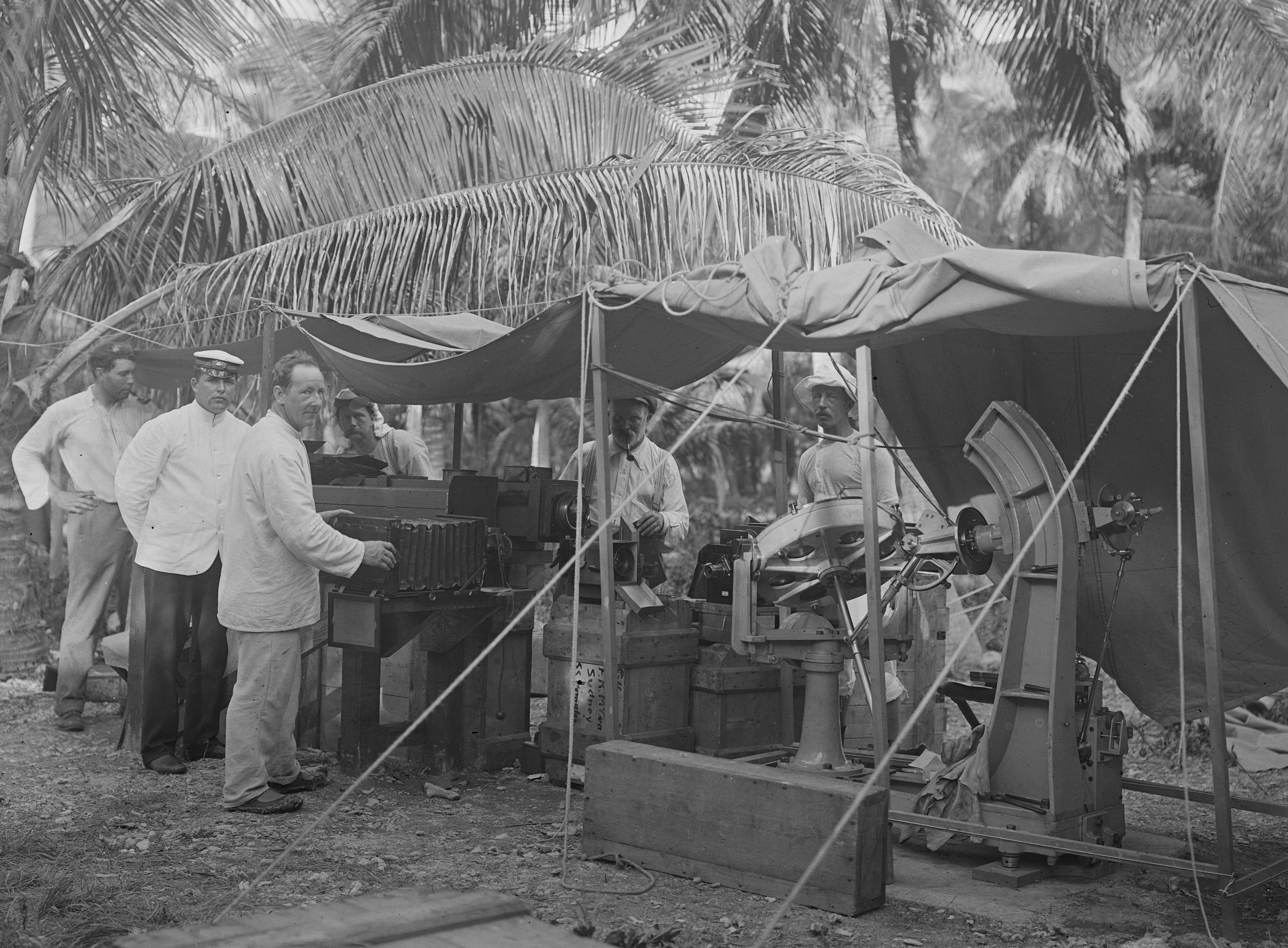
Winkelmann (right) surrounded by photography equipment during the expedition to view the 3 January 1908 solar eclipse at Flint Island

Winkelmann established his photography business in August 1901 at 31b Victoria Arcade, corner of Queen Street and Shortland Street in Auckland, with his work regularly being published in New Zealand and overseas publications, including being a contracted photojournalist for the Auckland Weekly News and the New Zealand Graphic (the latter of whom had been publishing his images since 1896.). In the same year, Winkelmann became an investor in the redevelopment of Mansion House on Kawau Island as a guest house, which he took extensive photographs of. In 1902, Winkelmann was commissioned to photograph a series advertising the Northern Steamship Company's Clansman, a steamship which travelled between Auckland and the Bay of Islands, and in August 1902 accompanied the government steamship Hinemoa, photographing the crew servicing lighthouses in the Auckland and Northland areas. From April to June 1903, Winkelmann as a photographer for the Auckland Weekly News took part in a government visit to Pacific Island nations and territories led by Charles H. Mills, which included visits to Pago Pago, Apia and Niue.

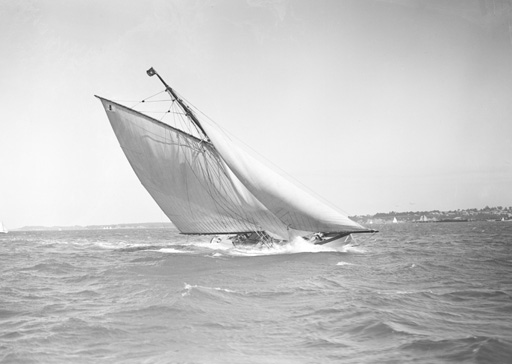
View of the Ariki in stormy weather near Auckland in 1923

Much of Winkelmann's work focused on maritime scenes, panoramic views, well-known families and residences, workplaces and significant events. A series of Winkelmann yacht photographs were later used as cigarette cards for Golden Floss and Blue Floss between 1923 and 1925. Winkelmann was an early adopter of the telephoto lens, using this to photograph cityscapes of Auckland in the 1900s. Among the events Winkelmann photographed were soldiers leaving Auckland during the Second Boer War in 1902, the 1904 visit of Lord Plunket to Auckland, the visit of the Great White Fleet in 1908, and the opening of the General Post Office Building in 1912. In 1906, he exhibited at the Christchurch International Exhibition, and in 1908 won the Auckland Weekly News photography competition. Winkelmann was an avid photographer of yachts and motorboats, climbing masts to photograph yacht race days in Auckland. Winkelmann's photographs of yachts were used for advertising campaigns for Ross Ltd Homocentric Lenses in 1907.

Winkelmann commissioned the Logan Brothers constructed and launched a motorboat for him. Named Tawaki, the boat was launched in November 1906, and the motorboat was upgraded with a more powerful engine in 1910. Winkelmann sold Tawaki in 1914, and commissioned another larger vessel in the same year, which he also named Tawaki. Winkelmann used Tawaki for leisure travel around New Zealand, often visiting the Bay of Islands.

Winkelmann took part in several scientific expeditions, beginning with the visit of the Union Steamship ship Taviuni to view the solar eclipse at Flint Island in 1907-1908. This was followed by an unsuccessful venture to photograph the Solar eclipse of May 9, 1910 at Port Davey, Tasmania which was hampered by rain, and the 1911 expedition to Vavaʻu to observe the Solar eclipse of April 28, 1911.

== Later life ==
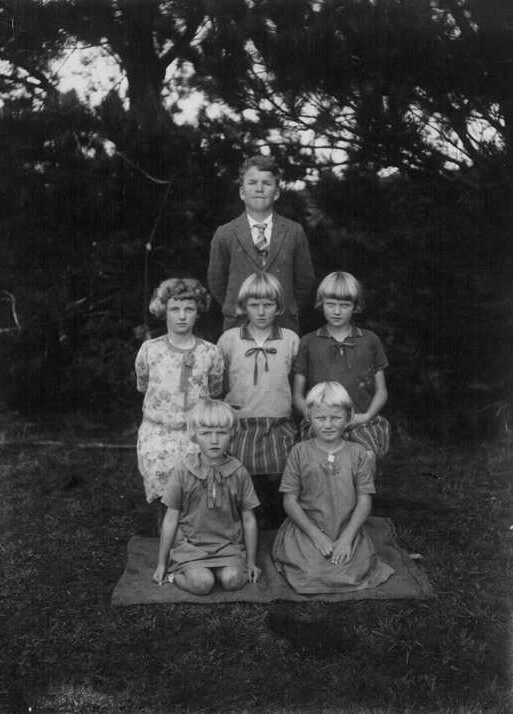
The Petersen family photographed at Swanson in the late 1920s

In late 1913 Winkelmann purchased a farm at Kaukapakapa and he spent much of World War I there, a period that saw him retreat from most social life except for yachting race days. Winkelmann was commissioned less as a photographer from 1914 onward, and was not able to recover his business after the war. Biographer Vivian Edwards suggests may have been due to Winkelmann's German surname and anti-German sentiment in New Zealand during World War I. Despite this, Winkelmann won his most prestigious award, the grand prix award at the 1915 Panama–Pacific International Exposition in San Francisco, during this period.

Winkelmann increasingly withdrew from Auckland social life, and by September 1917, had resigned from the Royal New Zealand Yacht Squadron. His withdrawal may have been in part due to grief, as two of his nephews and his friend Arthur Aitken had been killed during World War I, and his sister Emily dying of cancer in 1918. Winkelmann's loss of hearing intensified during the 1910s and 1920s, which may have also been a contributing factor.

Winkelmann settled in Swanson in 1917, establishing an orchard and fowl house. By 1927 he had accumulated 100 acres (40 ha) of land in the area. While living in Swanson, Winkelmann was asked to take family portraits of a local family, and was inspired to teach the family's son, Olaf Petersen, how to use a camera. Petersen later became a well-regarded nature photographer in his own right.

== Death and legacy ==
Upon his retirement in 1928, Winkelmann sold his collection of Auckland city negatives to the Old Colonists Museum, becoming part of the Auckland Public Library collections in 1957 after the closure of the museum. He spent his retirement in Swanson and Ponsonby. Winkelmann developed a heart problem after retiring, and died at a private hospital in Mount Eden on 5 July 1931. Winkelmann was buried at Purewa Cemetery.

New Zealand photography historian William Main cites Winkelmann as one of Auckland's most gifted pioneer photographers, highlighting his skill in marine photography. Much of Winkelmann's marine photography was taken from moving decks of vessels, or by holding onto the swaying masts of vessels.

In his will he left his collection of photographs and Glass-plate negatives were left to the Auckland War Memorial Museum, and his land to his nephew Eric Fox. In 1972, Fox gifted to the Auckland Museum more of Winkelmann's negatives, a large number of lantern slides, two photo albums, as well as a large number of original prints. To mark the 2003 America's Cup held in Auckland, an exhibition was held at Auckland War Memorial Museum over Summer 2002-2003 entitled On the Water, which featured Winkelmann's images of yachts and maritime racing.

Winkelmann's glass-plate negatives stored at the Auckland War Memorial Museum and Auckland Libraries were inscribed on the UNESCO Memory of the World Aotearoa New Zealand Ngā Mahara o te Ao register in 2023.

== Personal life ==
Winkelmann never married. Among Winkelmann's collection are photographs of him and friends bathing together in the hot pools on Great Barrier Island, sharing a bed, and kissing. Winkelmann also captured photographs of well-known cruising spots in Auckland. An image taken by Winkelmann of two men kissing aboard a yacht was used as the cover of the book Best Mates: Gay Writing in Aotearoa New Zealand (1997) by Peter Wells and Rex Pilgrim, something which at the time was against the wishes of the management of Auckland War Memorial Museum, who owned the photograph.

Winkelmann was a member of the Auckland Yacht Club from 1899, the Canterbury Freehold Land Association, the Victoria Cruising Club, the New Zealand Power Boat Association, the Sydney Mechanics' School of Arts, the Auckland Savage Club, and was a Freemason.

== Gallery ==
Photographs by Henry Winkelmann

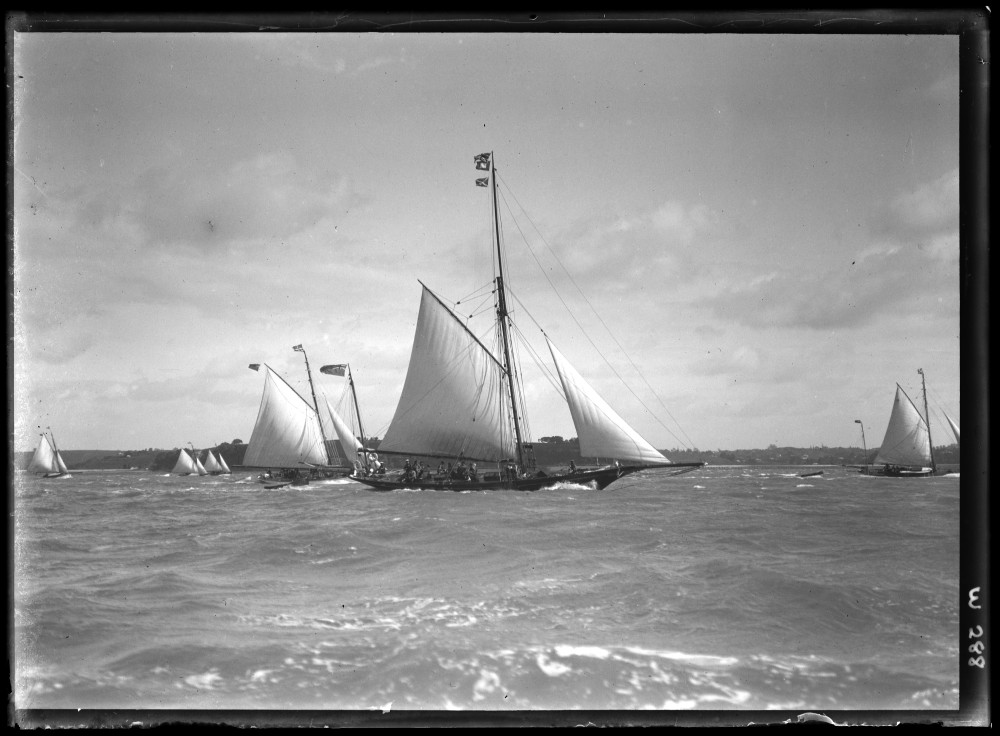
Showing the yacht Viking with the governor aboard, taken 30 November 1912

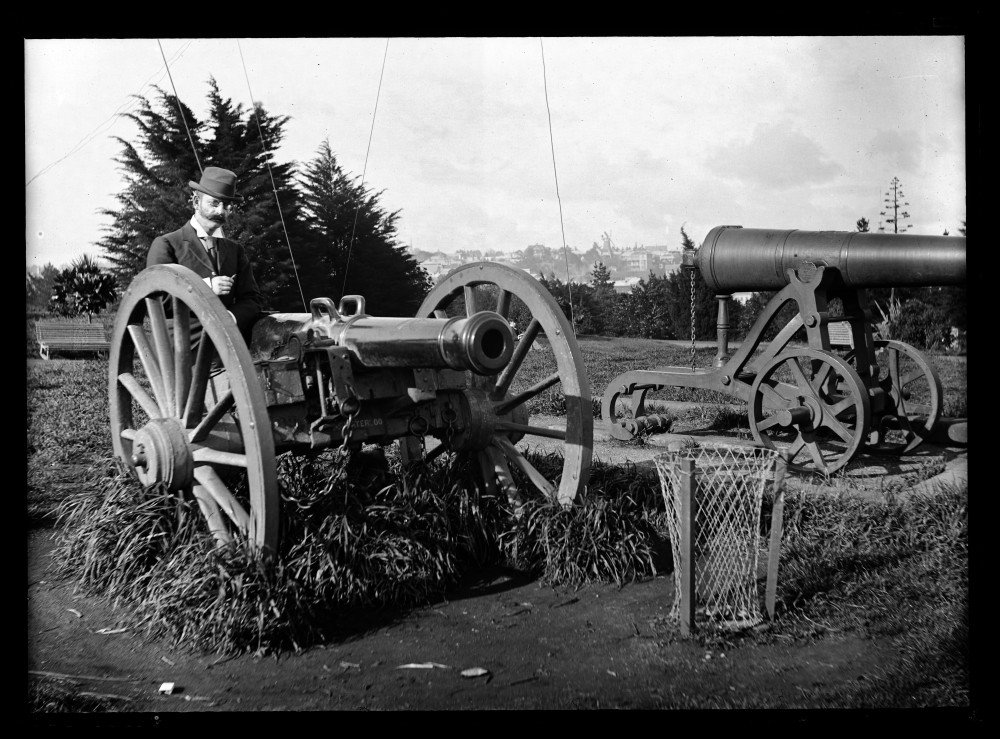
Showing two artillery guns in Albert Park, taken October 1898

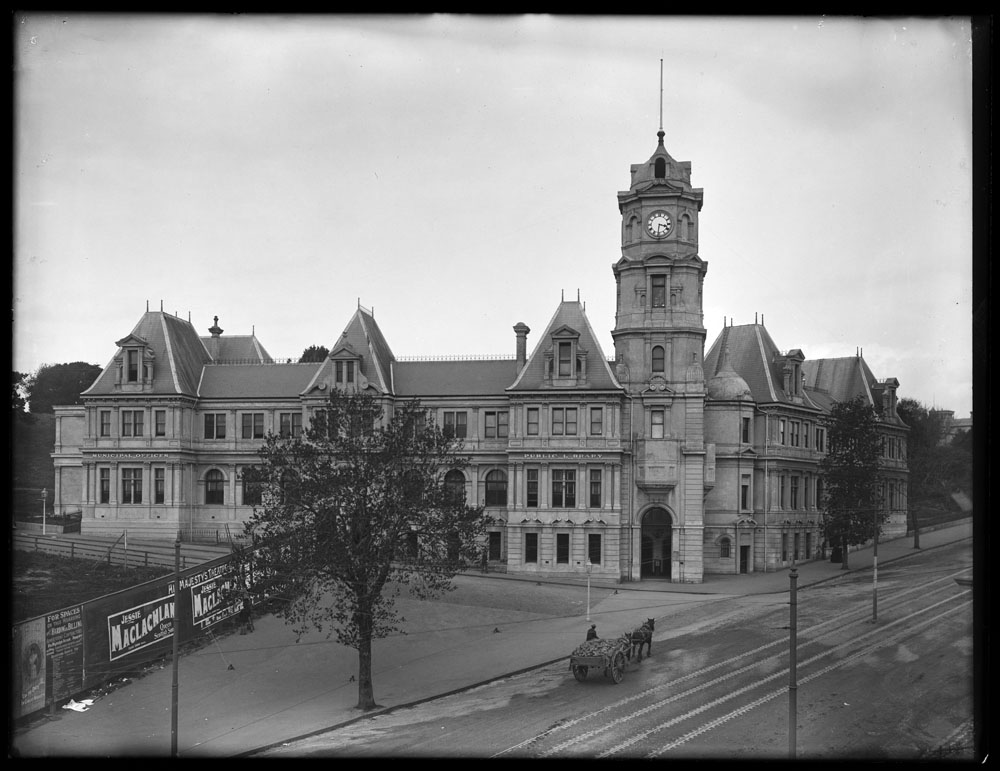
Looking east towards Albert Park showing the Auckland Public Library, taken 1905

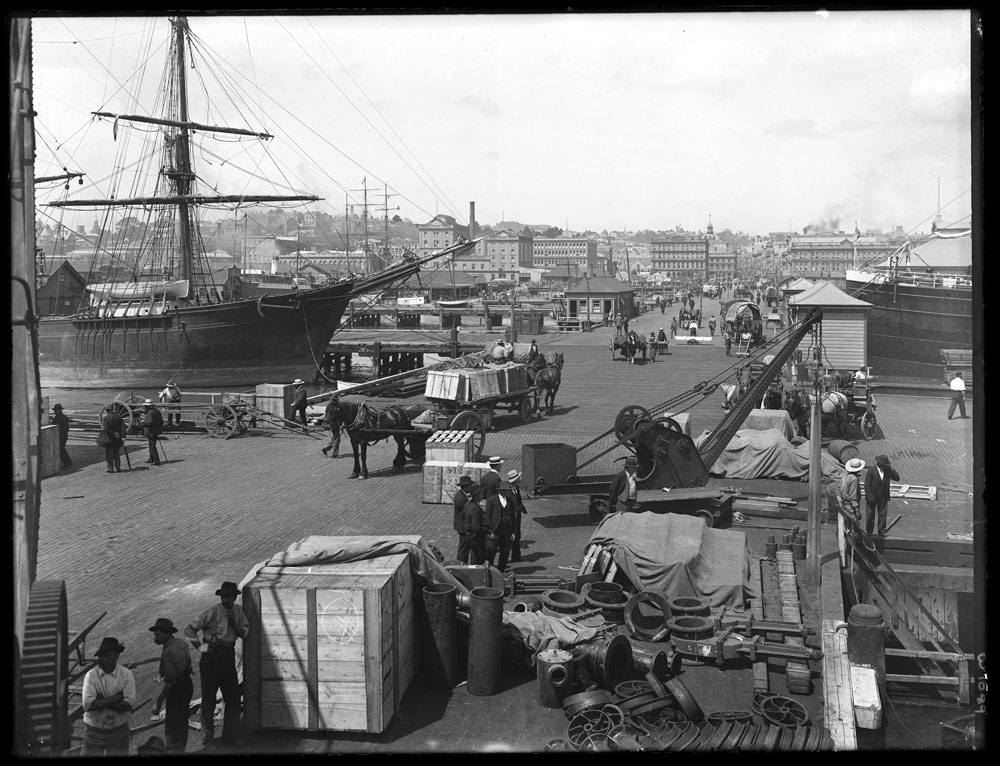
Looking south towards Queen Street showing general activity on Queen Street Wharf, taken 8 February 1904

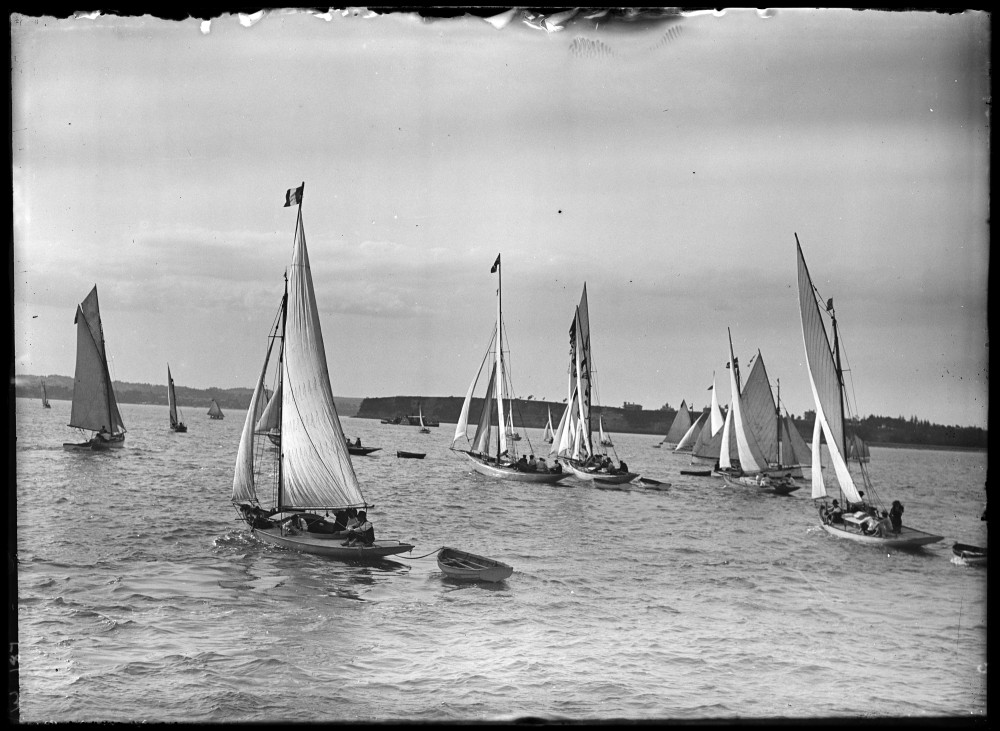
Showing a yachting demonstration on the departure of the eighth volunteer contingent for the Boer War, taken 1 February 1902

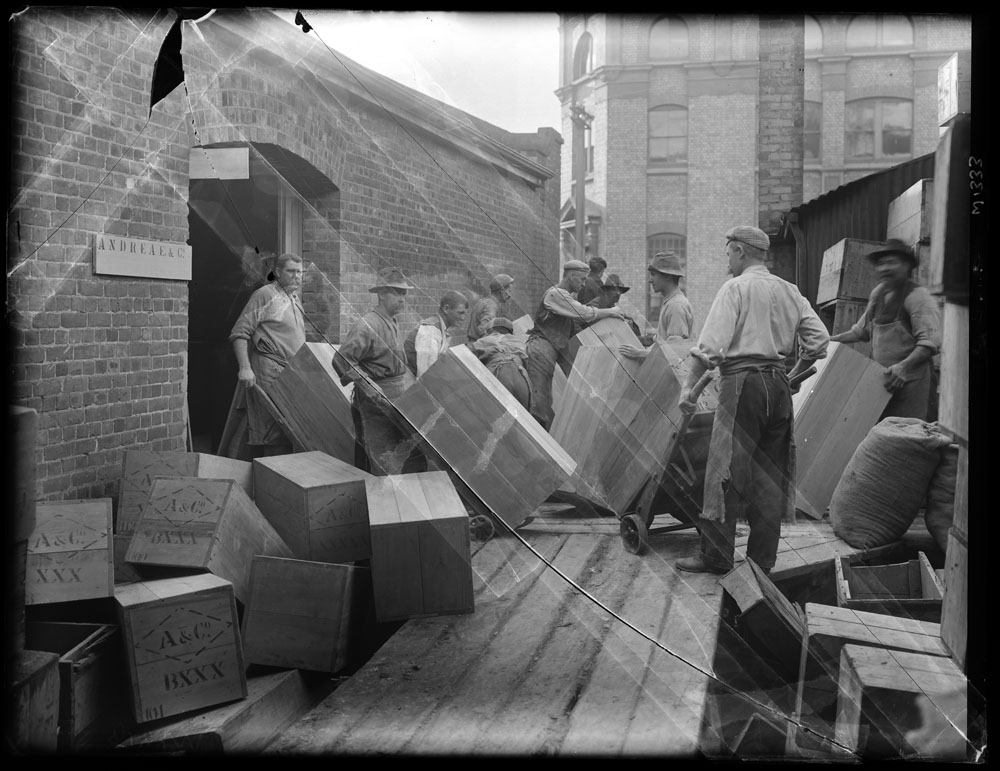
Showing cases of kauri gum being loaded on to a dray, taken July 1905

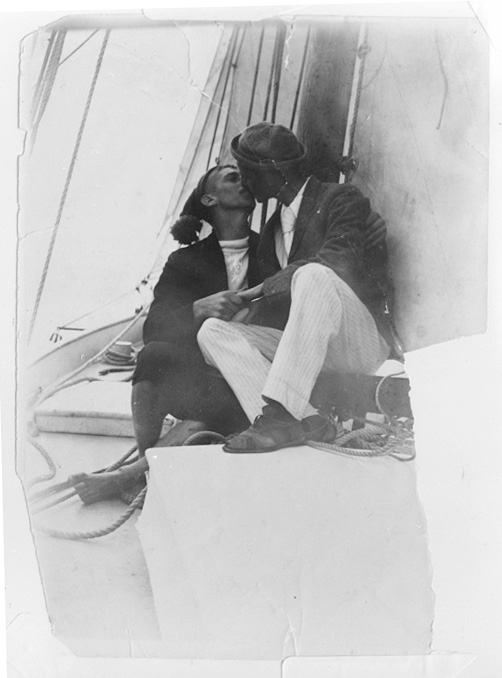
Two men, Walter Airey and Bob Horton, kissing on board the yacht Tawera c. 1900

== Bibliography ==
- Adam, Jack; Burgess, Vivien; Ellis, Dawn (2004). Rugged Determination: Historical Window on Swanson 1854-2004. Swanson Residents and Ratepayers Association Inc. ISBN 0-476-00544-2.
- Brickell, Chris (2008). Mates & Lovers: A History of Gay New Zealand. New Zealand: Godwit. ISBN 978-1-86962-134-6.
- Edwards, Vivian (1987). Winkelmann: images of early New Zealand. Illustrator: Henry Winkelmann. Auckland: Benton Ross Publishers Ltd. ISBN 978-0-908636-39-6. OCLC 19734367. OL 2237398M. Wikidata Q124381612.
- Elliott, Robin; Kidd, Harold; Wilson, T. L. Rodney (1998). Winkelmann's Waitemata: Classic Auckland Yachting. Birkenhead: David Ling Publishing. ISBN 0-908990-52-9. OCLC 45653567. Wikidata Q133827937.
- Main, William (1977). Auckland Through a Victorian Lens (Hardback). Wellington: William Main. ISBN 978-0-90858-205-1.
