= Aoma =

Aoma or AOMA may refer to

- Association of Algerian Muslim Ulema, cultural and religious organisation in Algeria
- Ivbiosakon language, also known as the Aoma language
- A boat built by the Logan Brothers
