= Ariki (yacht) =

New Zealand racing yacht

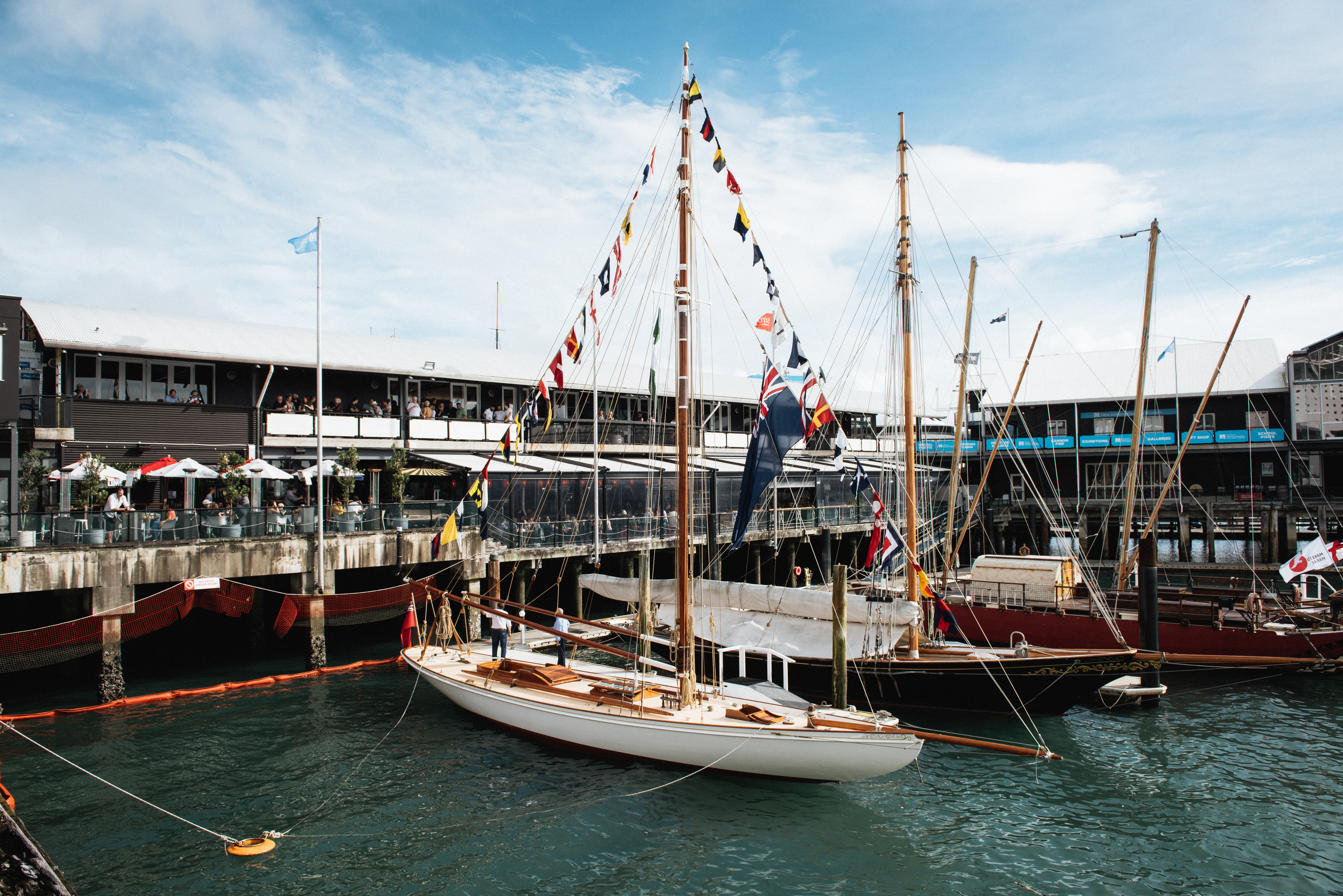
- The Ariki after restoration in April 2018

History

New Zealand
- Name: Ariki
- Builder: Logan Brothers
- Laid down: 1904
- Launched: October 1904
- Home port: Auckland, New Zealand
- Identification: A3
- Status: In service
- Yacht designer: Archibald Logan

General characteristics
- Class & type: New Zealand gaff-rigged cutter
- Type: Yacht
- Displacement: 9.35 tonnes
- Length: 54 ft 0 in (16.46 m) overall, 36 ft 6 in (11.13 m) waterline
- Beam: 10 ft 10 in (3.30 m)
- Draught: 7 ft 2 in (2.18 m)
- Propulsion: Sail
- Build: Three layers of kauri planking on the hull. Wooden frames. Oregon spars.

Ariki is a racing yacht which was built in Auckland, New Zealand in 1904 by Logan Brothers. She had a distinguished career as a racing and cruising yacht. From the time of her launch in October 1904, she dominated first class Auckland yacht racing until the appearance of the yacht Ranger in 1938. She has the sail number A3. Ariki is the Maori name for chief or leader.

== Development ==
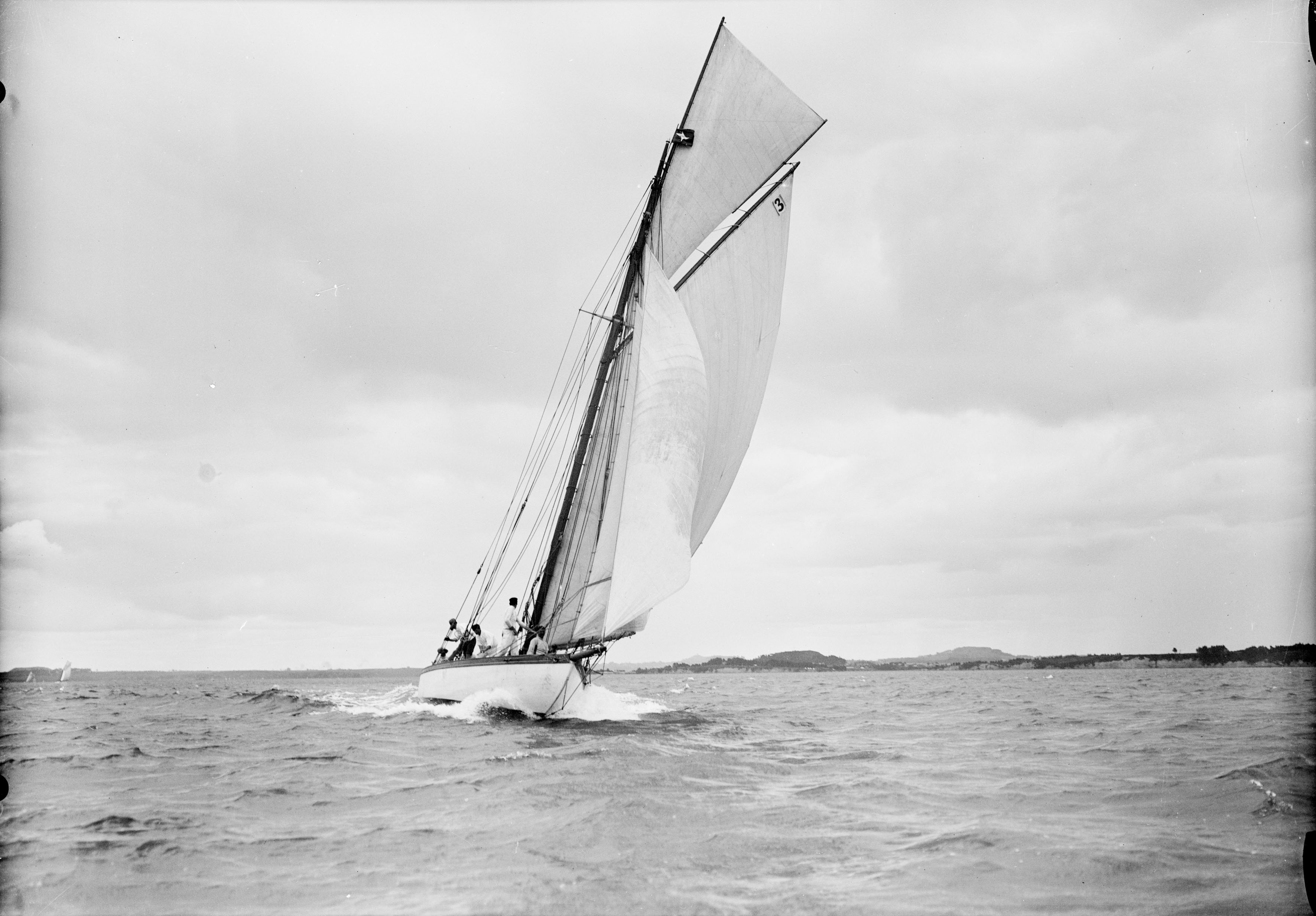
Ariki in the 1905 Auckland Anniversary Regatta

Ariki was designed by Archibald Logan and built by Logan Brothers for Charles Horton of the Horton publishing family as a combined racing and cruising yacht. Ariki's design was based on the Logan brother's highly successful Rainbow of 1898, which in turn had been inspired by the George Lennox Watson designed royal yacht Britannia of 1893. Ariki was a gaff-rigged cutter with a jackyard topsail. Featuring a spoon-bowed and counter-stern, her hull was planked in copper fastened kauri, consisting of two thinner layers of planks that were diagonal to each other and the third skin of planks running horizontally fore and aft along the yacht. She featured a flush deck with no cabin top visible above the deck.

Ariki features in the early New Zealand photographs of Henry Winkelmann.

In December 1907 she ran aground on a sandbar at Tolaga while sailing from Gisborne to Auckland. Horton owned Ariki until 1910 when he sold her to prominent lawyer E.C. Blomfield. In 1914, Blomfield sold her to businessman Alfred Nathan, a director of L.D Nathan. In 1917 she was washed ashore at Devonport by a storm. She was repaired by Chas Bailey, who was the Logan Brother's boatbuilding rival. In 1920 he was sold to W.R. 'Willie' Wilson, a partner in the publishing firm of Wilson & Horton.

The Goodfellow family then owned Ariki from 1934 onwards for many years. During this period she was mostly used for cruising, to assist in which the family installed an engine. In 1936 a new mast, taller than the original was installed. Consideration was given to converting her to a Bermudan configuration, but she retained her gaff rig, but with new main and headsails sourced from Ratsey & Lapthorn of the Isle of Wight.

The launching of the Lou Tercel designed and built Ranger in 1938 signaled the end of Ariki's dominance of Auckland first-class racing. Up until that time she had been the scratch boat of the first class (A-class) fleet.

After World War II the Goodfellow family sold Ariki to Arthur Angell and H.C. Cove Littler, later his son Hugh Littler, who continued to race her. After the Littler family bought another yacht, Ariki spent most of her time unused and sitting at her mooring.

== Restoration ==
A syndicate consisting of Warwick Jones, Rodger Duncan, and Peter Blundell purchased her on 30 March 1977. They found her deck and beams were in poor condition. Taken to a shed in Clevedon she emerged after four years with a replaced deck, restored skylight, cabin top, cabin interior and coamings, while the engine was shifted forward to improve her balance.

She was returned to the water in January 1981. As Duncan and Blundell had their own boats, the syndicate eventually broke up, with Jones becoming the sole owner.

Warwick Jones died in 2012 leaving Ariki's future unclear. In December 2016 Andrew Barnes and Charlotte Lockhart purchased her from Jones' widow and started a new restoration, led by the experienced wooden boat builder, Robin Kenyon in April 2017 at Okahu Bay in Auckland. She was relaunched at the National Maritime Museum in Auckland on 29 April 2018 and will be berthed there.

== Gallery ==
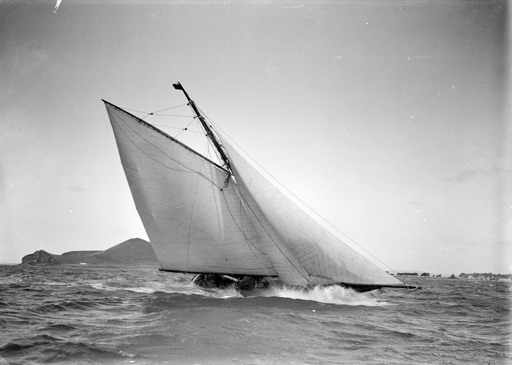
Ariki sailing in rough weather off the coast of Motukorea in 1912

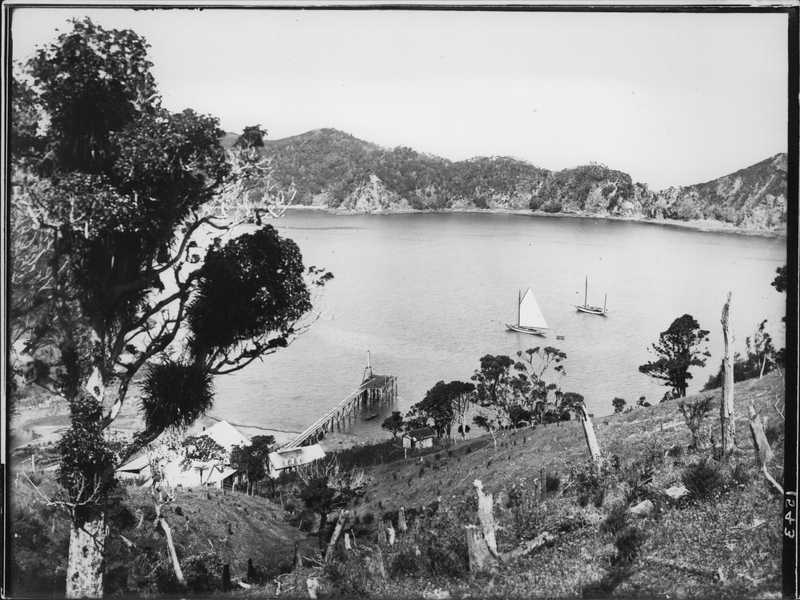
Ariki and Ilex anchored in the Whangamumu Harbour, Far North District in 1905

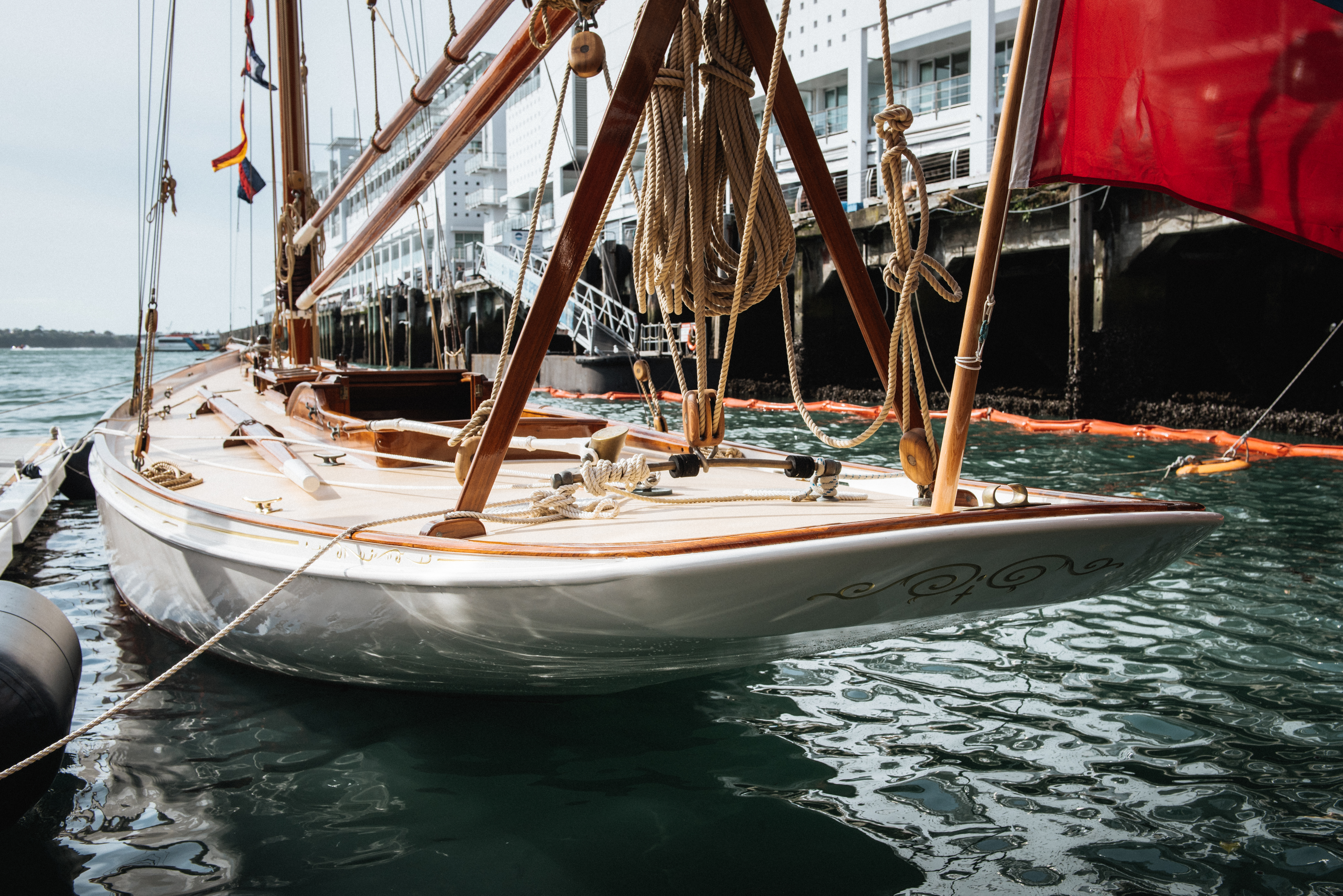
Ariki at the New Zealand Maritime Museum in 2018

== Bibliography ==
- Elliott, Robin; Kidd, Harold; Pardon, David (1999). Southern Breeze - A History of Yachting in New Zealand (Hardback). Auckland: Penguin Books. ISBN 0-670-88650-5.
- Elliott, Robin; Kidd, Harold; Wilson, T. L. Rodney (1998). Winkelmann's Waitemata: Classic Auckland Yachting. Birkenhead: David Ling Publishing. ISBN 0-908990-52-9. OCLC 45653567.
- Holmes, Noel (1971). Century of Sail - Official History of the Royal New Zealand Yacht Squadron (Hardback). Wellington: Whitcombe and Tombs. ISBN 0-7233-0305-3.
- Wilkins, Ivor (2010). Classic - The Revival of Classic Boating in New Zealand (Hardback). Auckland: Random House. ISBN 978-1-86962-162-9.
