= Archibald Logan =

Boat builder and designer

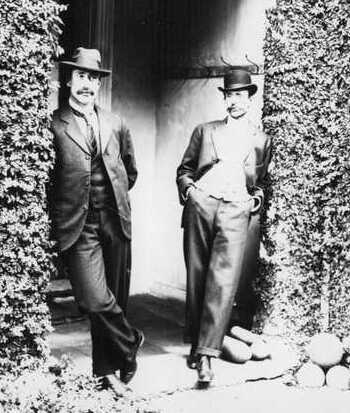
Archibald Logan (left) and Robert Logan Junior at Kawau Island in 1899

Archibald Arch Logan (28 November 1865 – 27 March 1940) was a New Zealand sailing yacht designer who was a leading figure in New Zealand yachting from approximately 1895 until his death. The Arch Logan Memorial Trophy named in his honour is the premier trophy of the New Zealand M class centreboard racing dinghy sailing completions.

== Early life ==
Archibald Logan was born on 28 November 1865 at Greenock, Renfrewshire, Scotland, the third of eight children of Robert Logan and Margaret McLay. Robert, who was a boat builder, and his family emigrated to New Zealand, arriving in Auckland on the Zealandia on 15 October 1874.

In 1878 Robert set up in business as a boat builder in Devonport. After attending school at Devonport Archibald Logan, together with four of his five brothers, was employed in his father's business.

== Logan brothers ==
In approximately 1890 Archibald and his brother Robert set up in business as R. & A. Logan on land reclaimed for the freezing works on the city side of Waitemata Harbour. In 1892 they were joined by their brother John, and the firm became known as Logan Brothers. Their business became very successful, and from 1898 they began exporting yachts to Australia, South Africa and the Pacific region. Their keel yachts were especially sought after but they also built a large number of centreboard craft, pleasure launches and commercial craft. By 1900 Archibald Logan was not only the principal designer for Logan Brothers, but also the pre-eminent yacht designer in the southern hemisphere.

Among his designs during this period were:

- Gloriana (1892), a keel cutter which was the first project by the firm of Logan Brothers.
- Moana (Launched 14 November 1895).
- Thelma (1897), a keel cutter which was Logan Brother's first large yacht.
- The prototype for the Patiki unballasted centreboard sailing dinghy. This was commissioned in 1898 by the newly formed Parnell Sailing Club.
- Kotiri (1897), a keel cutter built for Percy Dufaur.
- Rainbow (1898), a keel cutter built for A.T. Pittar.
- Iorangi (1901), a keel sloop built for A. H. Turnbull of Wellington.
- Erica (1903), a 25 ft stemhead sloop built for E.H. Webster.
- Ilex. (1903). This cutter after being renamed Tu'uakitau and then Tuaikaepau she was lost in dramatic circumstances in 1962.
- Ariki (1904), a keel cutter built for Charles Horton, which dominated Auckland yacht racing for the next 35 years.
- Rawhiti (1905), a keel cutter built for A.T. Pittar of Sydney.
- Frances (1906), a keel cutter built for Robert Shakespear.
- Mona (1908,) a 26 ft mullet boat built for F. Rickers.
- Celox (1908,) a 26 ft mullet boat built for Tom Percy.
- Rawene (1908), a keel cutter built for Alfred Gifford. This was the last large yacht built by the Logan Brothers.
- Ngaira (1909), a 22 ft mullet boat built for A & C Oxenham.
- Venus (1909), a 22 ft mullet boat built for Robert Rae.

== Establishes his own business ==
In 1910 Logan Brothers closed their business after accepting compensation from the Auckland Harbour Board for the surrender of their long lease on the Auckland waterfront so that construction of King's Wharf and the King's Wharf Power Station could proceed.

Archibald Logan, who was then living in Stanley Point Road, Devonport, with a boatshed on Ngataringa Bay continued to build boats, but at a slower pace and increasingly began concentrating on the design side. He designed and built the champion shallow-drafted mullet boats, and after the First World War designed many keel yachts, centreboard craft (in particular the 18-foot Patiki M class) and power craft. By 1930 Logan was mostly occupied in yacht designing.

Among his designs during this period were:

- Ngaio (1921), a motor launch. One of her owners in the 1960s was Sir Keith Park.
- Valeria (1913), a 22 ft mullet boat built by Logan for A. Nelson.
- Omatere (1913), a 26 ft mullet boat designed and built by Logan for the Oxenham brothers.
- Lily (1920), a 20 ft mullet boat built by Peter Ballantine for himself.
- Huia (1924), a 22 ft mullet boat built by Joe Slattery for Reuben Conley.
- Rakoa (1924), a 22 ft mullet boat built by Joe Slattery for G.F. Saunders.
- Marika (1934), a 22 ft mullet boat built by Percey Vos for Ralph Judd.
- Little Jim (1934), a keel cutter built by Arnold 'Bill' Couldrey for Jim Mitchelson.
- Tawera (1935), a 'A' class keeler built by Colin Wild for Scott Wilson.
- Waiomo (1935), a 'A' class keeler built by Arnold 'Bill' Couldrey for Neil Mains.
- Temeraire (1936), a 22 ft mullet boat built by Doug Rogers for F.S. Marshall. *Aramoana (1938).
- Spray II (1938), a 30ft keel cutter built by L C Coulthard. For most of her life, she has been owned by the Duder Family (1949-1973, 1997- ).
- Gypsy (1939).
- Matara (1939), 18 ft V class yacht designed and built with his sons Doug and Jack. She dominated her class in Auckland racing from 1940 to 1948. This was Archibald Logan's last design.

== Death ==
Logan died on 27 March 1940. 12 months after his death the Arch Memorial Trophy was established in his honour.

== Personal life ==
Logan married Emma Sarah Shortt at Mangere on 24 May 1905. They had four children, Margaret, Sadie (Doreen), Douglas and Marmion (Jack). Douglas was killed in Italy in 1944 while serving in World War II. After 1945 Jack became a prominent designer, builder and helmsman of 18-foot yachts in New Zealand. Jack had a successful yacht racing career from 1946 to 1955.

== Bibliography ==
- Elliot, Robin; Kidd, Harold (2001). The Logans: New Zealand's Greatest Boat Building Family (Paperback). Auckland: David Ling Publishing Ltd. ISBN 978-0-90899-075-7.
- Elliot, Harold Kidd Robin; Pardon, David (1999). Southern Breeze – A History of Yachting in New Zealand (Hardback). Auckland: Penguin Books. ISBN 0-670-88650-5.
- Titchener, Paul (1978). Little Ships of New Zealand (Hardback). Wellington: A.H & A.W. Reed. ISBN 0-589-01068-9.
- Wilkins, Ivor (2010). Classic – The Revival of Classic Boating in New Zealand (Hardback). Auckland: Random House. ISBN 978-1-86962-162-9.
