= Olaf Petersen =

Olaf Petersen may refer to:

- Olaf Petersen, a character from Red Dwarf
- Olaf Petersen (photographer) (1915–1994), New Zealand photographer
- Olaf Wilhelm Petersen (1841–1909), Norwegian military officer and sports official
