= Tuaikaepau =

Tongan cutter wrecked in 1962

Coordinates: 23°55′19″S 179°05′34″W

History
- Name: Ilex (1902–c.1942); Tu'uakitau (c.1942–1957); Tuaikaepau (1957–1962)
- Builder: Logan Brothers
- Launched: 1903
- Fate: Wrecked 1962

General characteristics
- Type: Cutter
- Tonnage: 20 tons
- Length: 51 ft (16 m)

Tuaikaepau was a twenty-ton cutter, 51 feet (16 m) length, clipper bow, keeler, designed by Archibald Logan and built by Logan Brothers of Auckland, New Zealand and launched in 1903.

In July 1962 the Tuaikaepau was under sail between Tonga and Auckland, carrying a crew and passengers totalling 17.

On 7 July 1962 the Tuaikaepau, under the command of captain David Fifita, hit the outer edge of the Southern Minerva Reef.

They all survived having spent the night clinging to the hull and at day break saw what would be their saviour: the hull of a Japanese fishing boat, Number 10, Noshemi Maru, K30, which had been wrecked in 1960, two years earlier. In the hull of the Japanese fishing boat they built a still from which they were able to make fresh water. They found a match and lit a fire to run the still. The fire was kept burning almost constantly with wood from the hull of the wreck in which they were living.

By the end of August it was decided that the only hope of rescue was to build a small boat and sail to Fiji, which they promptly did with tools found in the hull of the Japanese boat and from the wreck of Tuaikaepau. The makeshift outrigger canoe, with the captain and two others on board, reached Kadavu Island with the news that there were 13 survivors shipwrecked on the reef, although the captain's son, one of the two crewmembers, died just before arriving at Kadavu, drowning while swimming ashore.

On Monday 16 October, an RNZAF Sunderland flying boat from Laucala Bay, Fiji, flown by Group Captain J.D. Robbins, dropped supplies to them. The next day, Tuesday 16 October, the same Sunderland landed in the lagoon and rescued the ten survivors (of whom five were by now bedridden) and one body, departing Minerva at 3:30 p.m. and reaching Suva by dark. The Tongans were taken to Suva's Colonial War Memorial Hospital, but the only real health issues were dehydration and, for one, the onset of tuberculosis. They were then taken to Nuku'alofa, where they were welcomed and acclaimed by the population and Queen Sālote Tupou III.

== Bibliography ==
- Ruhen, Olaf (1963). Minerva Reef: Fourteen desperate weeks with the castaway Tongans. Sydney, Australia: Minerva Bookshop Ltd.
- Feuiaki, Fine (1992). Minerva reef = Hakau Minerva: the Tuaikaepau's tragic voyage. Nuku'alofa, Tonga: Friendly Islands Bookshop.
- Titchener, Paul (1978). Little Ships of New Zealand (Hardback). Wellington: A.H & A.W. Reed. ISBN 0-589-01068-9.
