= Flint Island =

Uninhabited Pacific coral island - Part of Kiribati

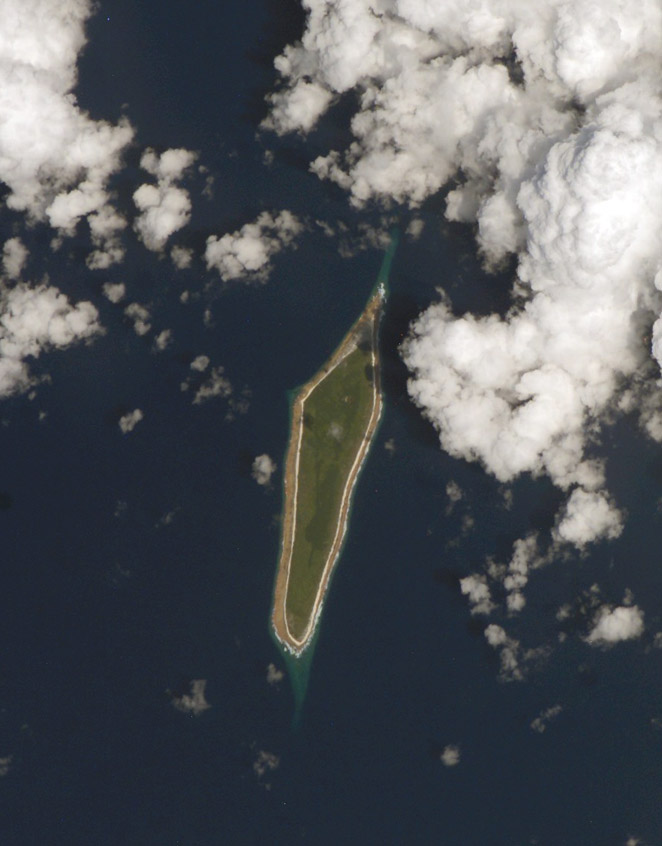
- NASA satellite image of Flint Island

- Location of Flint Island in Kiribati

Geography
- Location: Pacific Ocean
- Coordinates: 11°25′49″S 151°49′08″W
- Type: Low-Coral
- Archipelago: Line Islands
- Area: 2.6 km^{2} (1.0 sq mi)
- Length: 4,086 m (13406 ft)
- Highest elevation: 7.6 m (24.9 ft)

Administration
- Kiribati

Demographics
- Population: Uninhabited

Additional information
- Time zone: UTC+14

Flint Island is an uninhabited coral island in the central Pacific Ocean. It is one of several islands comprising the Southern Line Islands under the jurisdiction of Kiribati. In 2014, the I-Kiribati government established a twelve-nautical-mile (22-kilometre; 14-mile) exclusion zone around each of the southern Line Islands (Caroline, Flint, Vostok, Malden, and Starbuck), preventing fishing in the surrounding waters.

== Geography ==
Flint Island is located about 740 kilometres (400 nautical miles; 460 miles) northwest of Tahiti, 190 kilometres (100 nautical miles; 120 miles) south-southeast of Vostok Island, and 220 kilometres (120 nautical miles; 140 miles) southwest of Caroline Island. The island is about 2.5 miles (4.0 kilometres) long and 0.5 miles (0.8 kilometres) wide at its widest point (4 km × 0.8 km (2.5 mi × 0.5 mi)). It has a land area of 1 square mile (2.6 square kilometres) and rises to a height of 25 feet (7.6 metres) above sea level. The island is surrounded by a narrow fringing reef and with no safe anchorage, landing is difficult.

According to the U.S. Exploring Expedition (February 5, 1841), Flint had been thickly wooded with primeval forest, however, the island is now primarily covered with planted coconut palms.

There are four lakes of brackish water in the interior part of the island. The largest, Lake Arundel, is 168 meters across at its widest and theorised to be the remnant of a lagoon. The southernmost lake, Lake Chase, was created by an old well which had overflowed. The remaining two lakes, Lake Mago and Lake Bunya, were formed by guano mining. There is an abandoned network of tramways on the island that connects to Lake Mago and Lake Bunya, as the sites were once the largest guano mining areas on the island.

There is a small landing located in the north-west reef that had been blasted in, marked by a 9-meter-tall (30 ft) concrete obelisk on the beach.

Compared to the other Line Islands, Flint appears to experience greater quantities of rainfall, often experiencing weeks of rain at a time.

== History ==
Flint Island was discovered by the Spanish expedition of Ferdinand Magellan on 4 February 1521, and charted as Tiburones (Sharks in Spanish) because of the many sharks that sailors fished in it. Together with Puka-Puka (named San Pablo) they were named Islas Infortunadas (Unfortunate Islands in Spanish). Flint Island was rediscovered on April 8, 1809, by the American captain Obed Chase in ship Hope (belonging to Edmund Fanning). On the Island Chase had nailed an American coin to a tree, which would also make him the first known person to have set foot on it. This is likely where the modern name was coined. A now-discredited theory held that the island was named after Captain Keen, who visited in 1835, but an entry in Krusenstern's Hydrographie der grössern Ozeane, published in 1819, makes it clear the island already had this name. Flint Island was claimed under the 1856 U.S. Guano Act, but it was apparently never occupied.

It was leased by the British to Houlder Brothers and Co. of London who carried out guano digging in the central part of the island from 1875 to 1880 under field manager John T. Arundel. From 1881 John T. Arundel & Co. carried on the mining business. The excavated areas have since filled with brackish water, forming two of the four lakes. Coconut palms were planted on the island by Arundel in 1881 and copra was produced until 1891.

On 3 January 1908 a total eclipse of the sun was observed on the island by two expeditions, one from the Lick Observatory in California, and one from Australia and New Zealand which included Francis McClean and Henry Winkelmann. The observation point on the island was determined to be at 11°25′27″S 151°48′15″W latitude.

The island was leased in 1911 to S.R. Maxwell and Co., Ltd. who employed 30 men and one manager to harvest copra from the approximately 30,000 coconut palms. The settlement was abandoned in 1929. Today the coconut palms have taken over 96% of the island and have killed all but few pisonia trees.

On 11 August 1974 there were five Tahitian workers still mining guano, from a temporary camp, but the guano was of poor quality and rarely sold.

== Flora and Fauna ==
During the 1974 Line Islands expedition, Flint Island was reported to be covered by a dense wild jungle of palm trees. The jungle's moist environment is optimal habitat for Emoia impar, a type of skink that inhabits most of the island at a density of over 30 per square meter. The island is home to various birds, namely Sooty Terns, Red-Footed Boobies and Frigatebirds, which nest in the palm trees around Flint's beaches. Flint is also home to coconut crabs which live within the fallen trees of the jungle. Due to their reproductive success, these crabs cover the island, resulting in a high population density of approximately 1 crab per square meter. This density potentially makes Flint the site of the world's largest coconut crab population, with South Islet in Caroline Atoll being Flint Island's primary competitor.

== Photo gallery ==
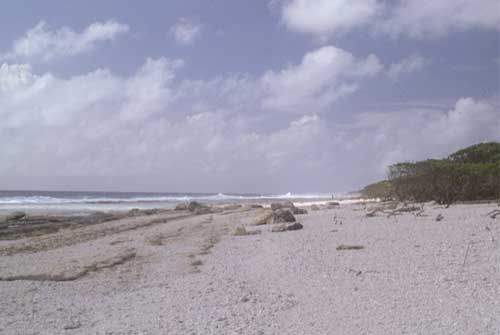
Beach on Flint Island

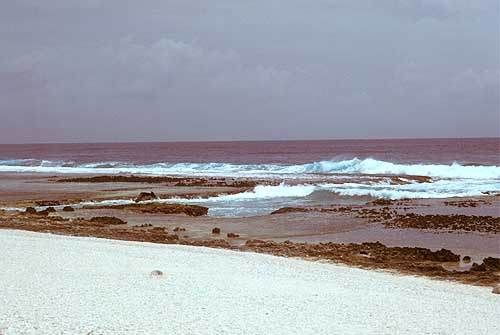
Fringing Reef on Flint Island

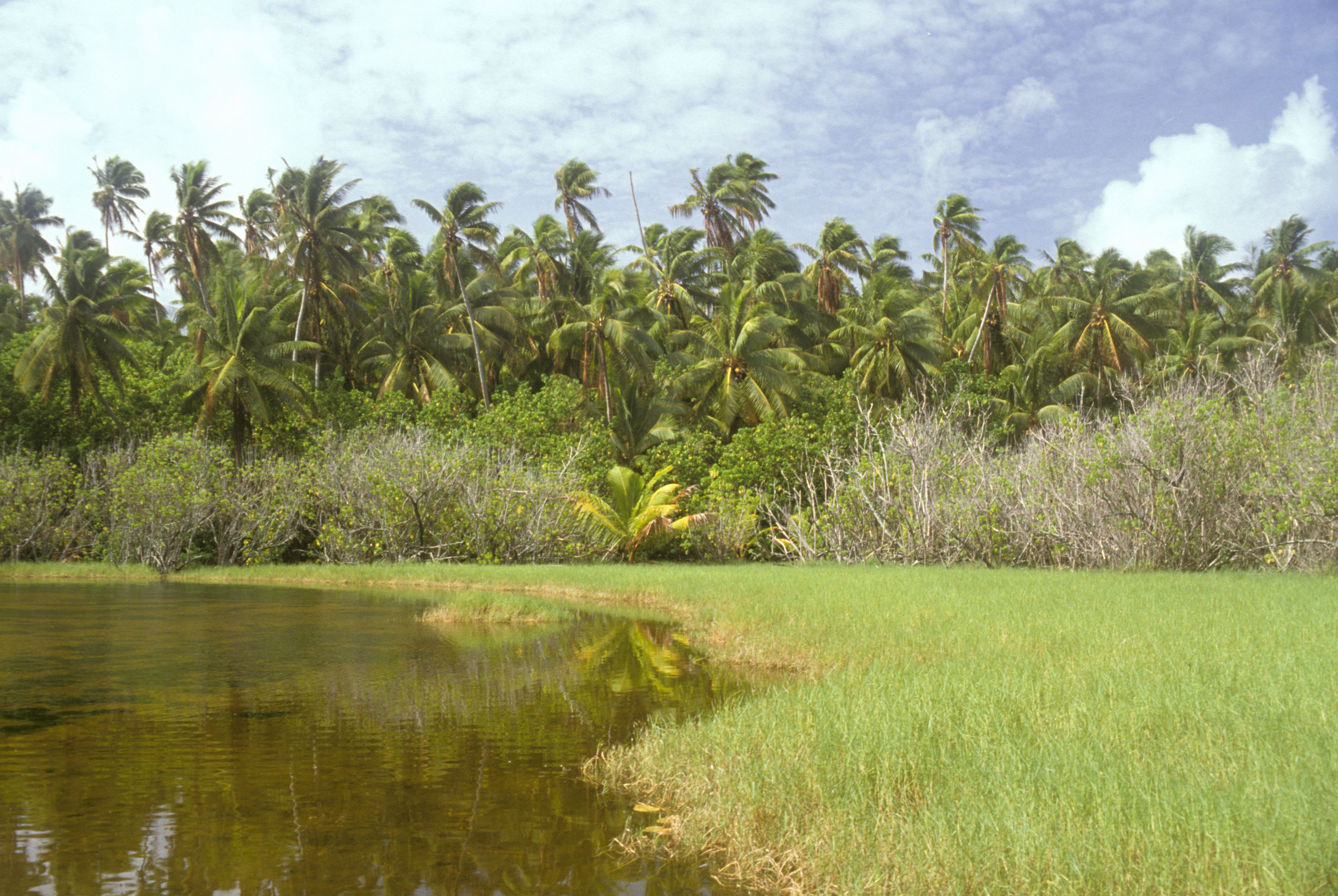
Lake Arundel in Flint Island's interior

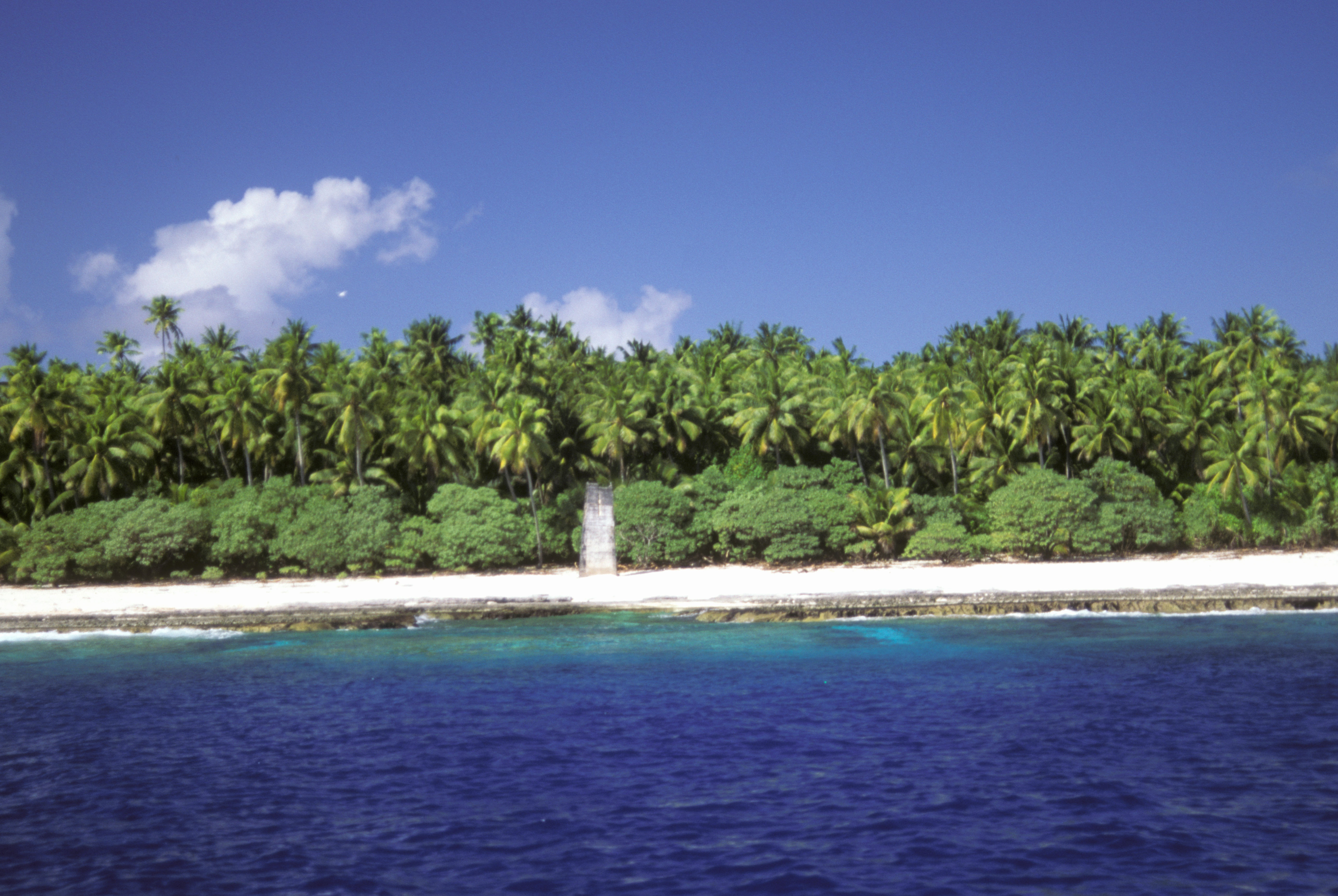
Heavy vegetation on Flint Island

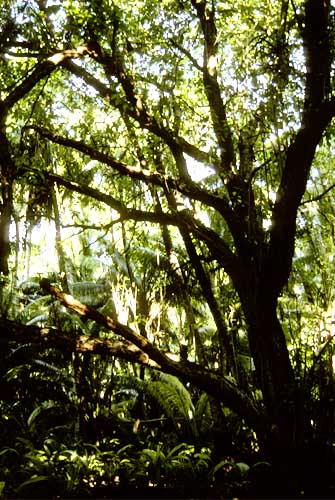
Stand of Pisonia on Flint Island

== See also ==
- List of Guano Island claims
- List of islands
- Desert island
