= Akarana =

New Zealand racing yacht

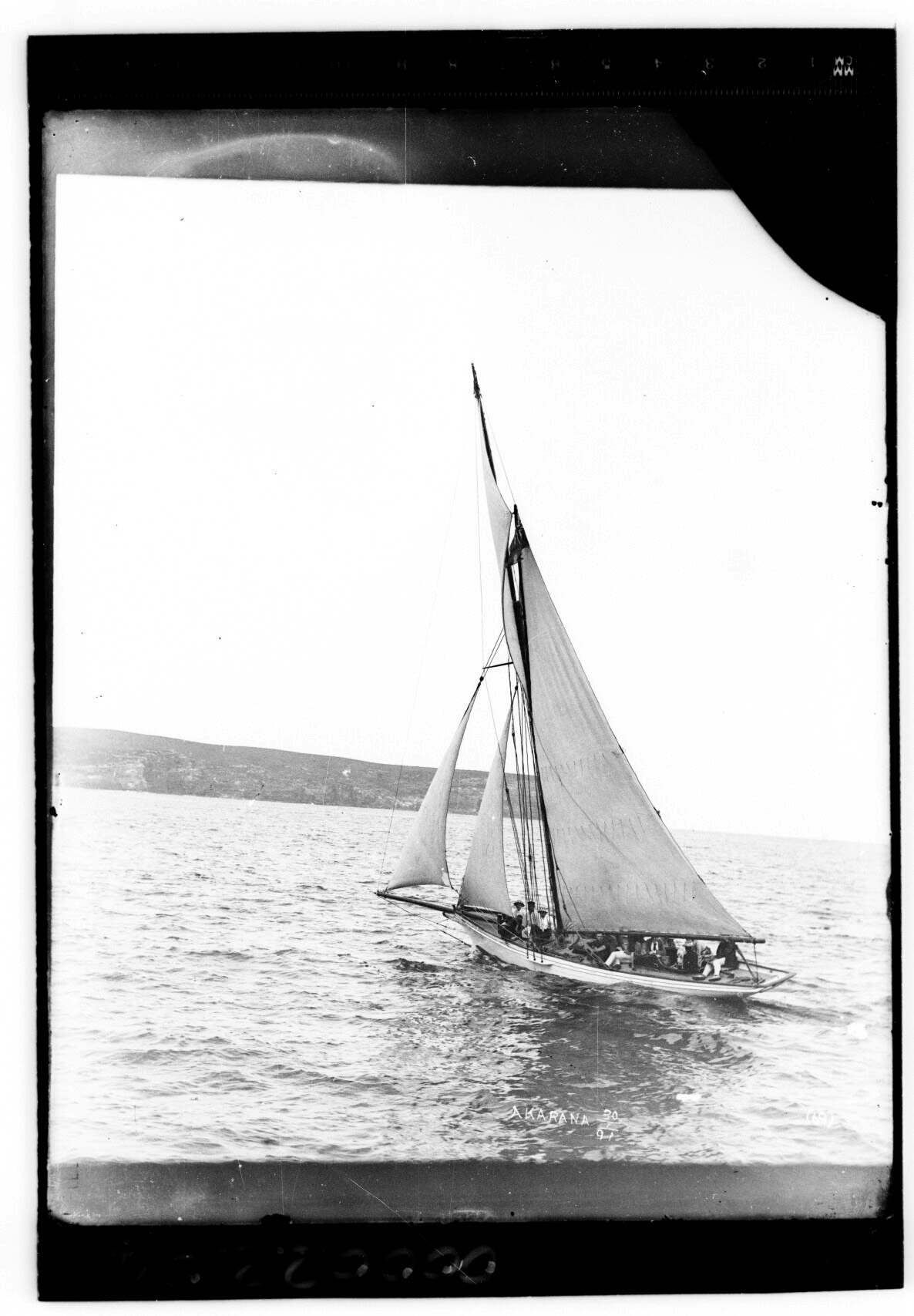
- Akarana sailing off North Head

History
- Name: Akarana
- Builder: Robert Logan Senior
- Laid down: 1888
- Launched: 5 October 1888
- Maiden voyage: 1888
- Status: Preserved at the Australian National Maritime Museum

General characteristics
- Type: cutter
- Displacement: 9.35 tonnes
- Length: 39 feet (12 m) overall; 29 feet (8.8 m) waterline
- Beam: 6 feet 8 inches (2.03 m)
- Draught: 6 feet 6 inches (1.98 m)
- Sail plan: Gaff-rigged; 79.9 square metres (860 sq ft) sail area; Egyptian cotton sails
- Build: Three layers of kauri planking on the hull. wooden frames. Oregon spars.

Akarana is a racing yacht which was built in Auckland, New Zealand, in 1888 by Robert Logan (Senior) to represent that country in the Australian Centennial Regatta held on Hobson's Bay, Victoria. She was restored as New Zealand's bicentenary gift to Australia and is today currently the oldest vessel in the collection of the Australian National Maritime Museum.

"Akarana" is the Māori name for Auckland. The yacht was presented with the burgee of the Auckland Yacht Club.

== Development ==
Akarana was designed and built by Robert Logan (Senior) as a spec project with the hope of successfully completing in the Australian Centennial Regatta which was being held over the summer of 1888–1889. The boat building market in New Zealand was in a downturn as the country was in the grip of a depression, and Logan hoped that success in completion would not only allow him to sell her in Australia, but would also lead to commissions from that country.

Akarana was launched at North Shore, Auckland, on 5 October 1888.

== Racing career ==
=== Melbourne ===
The day after being launched, Akarana, accompanied by Robert Logan, his skipper Jack Bell, and crew, was shipped on the SS Nemesis to Melbourne. Other New Zealand yachts had previously fared well in competition on Hobson's Bay, and Akarana's arrival created great interest in yachting circles. The first race which took place in Hobson's Bay was for the St. Kilda Yacht Club medal, which she won. Logan had designed Akarana to complete in the five-ton race. However the organising regatta's committee rated her at seven tons with a five-ton (5.1 tonne) lead keel. As a result, Akarana then completed in the first day's racing of the Australian Centennial Regatta in the 5-10 ton class race for keel and centreboard yachts. This race she won, beating the yachts Cooeeana, Madge, Galatea and Pert.

On the next day's racing, in the race for yachts with a waterline length of 20 to 30 feet (6.1 to 9.1 m), she was defeated by Galatea. As Assegai, which was also entered in this race, did not reach Melbourne from Sydney in time to compete because of heavy weather, a prize was offered by Sir W. Clark for a race for similar yachts; Galatea won again, with Akarana fourth behind Assegai and Madge in deteriorating conditions.

=== Sydney ===
Robert Logan then shipped Akarana on Burrumbeet to Sydney to compete in the National Regatta on Anniversary Day, January 1889. Logan was disappointed upon arrival to find out that nearly all the yacht racing was club racing, and that, as he was not a member, Akarana could not compete. Logan however entered Akarana in the race for all yachts under 10 tons at the Anniversary Regatta held on 26 January 1889. Before this race Logan had an extra half-ton of load added to her keel.

Skippered by Dick Hellings, Akarana won the principle event of the day, an open race for the first prize of £20 and three cases of Moet and Chandon champagne, beating Sydney yachts Assegai, Iolanthe and Sirocco.

In May 1889 Logan sold Akarana to Sydney chemist John Abraham, who sailed with the Royal Sydney Yacht Squadron.

The yacht remained in Sydney, passing through several owners. These owners made many changes, including progressive reduction of the rig and loss of 4 feet (1.2 m) off the stern. Modifications to the keel and rudder resulted in a shallower draft and reduced her ballast. The original lead keel was removed in the mid-1920s, and it was not until the 1950s that a smaller section of lead was restored.

== Restoration ==
The New Zealand government decided in 1987 to restore Akarana and give her to Australia as the county's gift to celebrate the Australian Bicentennial in 1988. The government purchased her from her existing owner, Andrew Bishop. Instead of the planned start date of 14 May 1987, delays meant she did not arrive back to New Zealand until 24 July 1987. Overseen by the Ministry of Transport in conjunction with the Ministry of Foreign Affairs, the restoration of the hull was undertaken by Salthouse Boatbuilders at Greenhithe, while the Navy Dockyard at Devonport were responsible for the masts, spars and rigging.

The outer skin and decking were replaced. Where possible, the configuration of the stern and above-water sections of the vessel were restored to the cutter's original appearance. The tight deadline meant that research into the vessel's configuration could not be completed, preventing full restoration of sections below the waterline. There was also no time for sailing trials.

Akarana was returned to Australia and ended up in the ownership of the Australian National Maritime Museum in Sydney.

== Australian National Maritime Museum ==
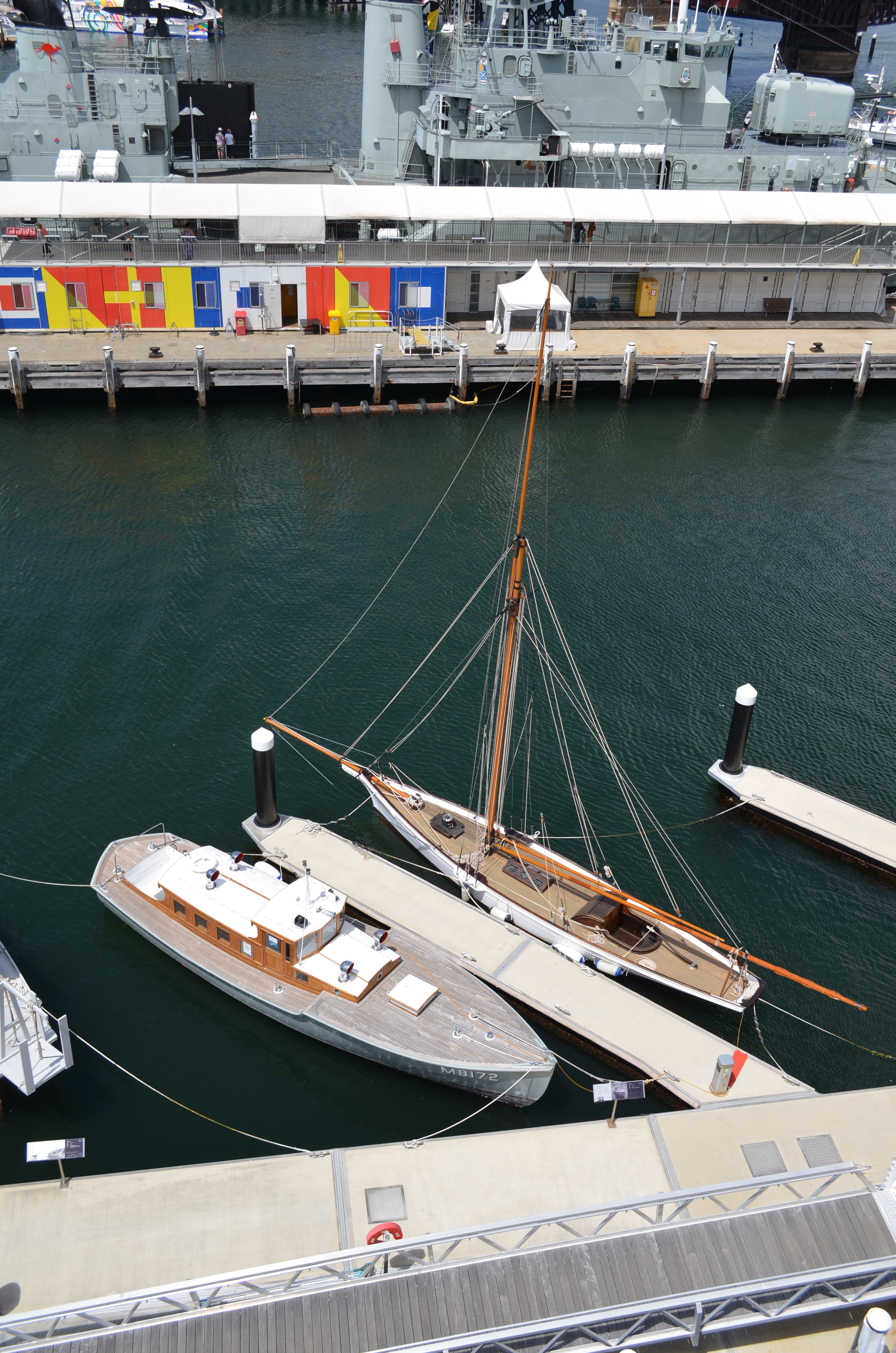
Akarana on display at the Australian National Maritime Museum, berthed beside the naval motor launch MB 172

Following the bicentennial restoration, the museum found the first time that she was sailed on Sydney Harbour that excessive heeling meant Akarana was unable to carry full sail. After intensive research, the keel, rudder, and other structures were rebuilt during 1997–98 to as close as possible to her original configuration. This research identified that the keel was light by two tonnes, and she was lacking some internal ballast. With a new five-tonne lead keel and the rudder rebuilt, Akarana obtained a deeper and more efficient profile. Combined with adjustments to the spars and sails, Akarana returned to service with an improved sailing performance.

Akarana is currently part of the permanent exhibition at the Australian National Maritime Museum.

== Bibliography ==
- Elliot, Robin; Kidd, Harold (2001). The Logans: New Zealand’s Greatest Boat Building Family (paperback). Auckland: David Ling Publishing Ltd. ISBN 978-0-90899-075-7.
- Elliot, Robin; Kidd, Harold; Pardon, David (1999). Southern Breeze - A History of Yachting in New Zealand (hardback). Auckland: Penguin Books. ISBN 0-670-88650-5.
- Holmes, Noel (1971). Century of Sail - Official History of the Royal New Zealand Yacht Squadron (hardback). Wellington: Whitcombe and Tombs. ISBN 0-7233-0305-3.
- Wilkins, Ivor (2010). Classic - The Revival of Classic Boating in New Zealand (hardback). Auckland: Random House. ISBN 978-1-86962-162-9.
