= Rona (1892) =

Sailing yacht

- Rona at ICY Regatta, Auckland 2003

History
- Owner: Alexander Horsburgh Turnbull (1892–); Harry Hardham and Huia Prince (1929–36); John W Roberts (Jack) (?-1942); Albert Ivan LeSueur 1942-1959 Purchased for 180 Pounds; John Palmer (–2006); Rona Preservation Trust (2006–)
- Builder: Robert Logan
- Launched: 1892

General characteristics
- Type: Sailing yacht
- Sail plan: gaff rigged cutter

Rona was a sailing yacht designed by George Lennox Watson. She was constructed in 1892 in Auckland, New Zealand, by master craftsman and designer Robert Logan Snr. for Wellington merchant and book collector Alexander Turnbull, and is the oldest continuously registered ship in New Zealand. The boat was sailed from Auckland to Wellington, leaving Auckland 14 February 1893 and Arrived Wellington Harbour on the 21 February 1893. An article in the Wellington Evening Post on the 22 February 1893 recounted its maiden voyage. The boat is one of the finest surviving examples of a six-beam cutter (her beam fits into her length six times; i.e., she has very slim lines), she is a gaff-rigged racing cutter, and she is one of the oldest yachts still sailing in New Zealand.

Rona is an example of 19th-century racing yacht design and construction. The boat was originally painted black, the colour used on New Zealand's America's Cup yachts.

Rona was restored to original condition by her last private owner, John Palmer, which took over nine years. That Rona was able to be maintained as a fully operational sailing vessel for over 110 years is due to her construction in kauri pine (Agathis australis), a fine-grained timber of excellent quality for boatbuilding.

The Rona Preservation Trust was set up to purchase Rona. This was accomplished in November 2006, with the assistance of grants from the Lotteries Foundation others, and the boat was made accessible to the community through sailing events, maintenance and training days and public open days.

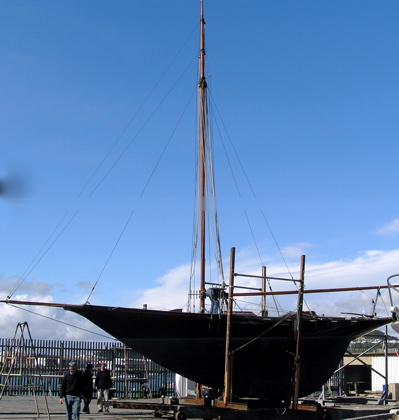
Rona on hard at Evans Bay, Wellington, in 2004

In May 2023 the yacht was transported to Peter Brookes Yard near Waimauku, Auckland for the next chapter. Andrew Barnes, Larry Paul and Peter were instrumental in making this happen.

She needs much remedial work. Garboards need to come off, deck beams, beam shelves, deck and gunnels need replacing.

A Give-a-little page is available to help raise the funds necessary to restore her. The end goal is to get her racing in Auckland harbour alongside other contemporary gaff yachts like Gloriana and Rogue.
