= Logan Brothers =

Australian shipbuilding firm

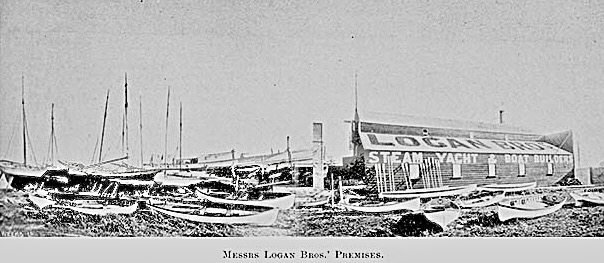
- Company type: Private
- Industry: Shipbuilding
- Founded: 1890
- Headquarters: Auckland
- Key people: Archibald Logan, Robert Logan, John Logan
- Products: Merchant ships Yachts
- Parent: Robert Logan Sr.

Logan Brothers was a firm of boat and yacht design and builders. Although their Auckland yard lasted only from 1890 to 1910, it was the most significant yacht- and boatbuilding business in the Southern Hemisphere during its time, dominating the New Zealand market and exporting vessels to Australia, South Africa and to the Pacific Islands.

== Establishment ==
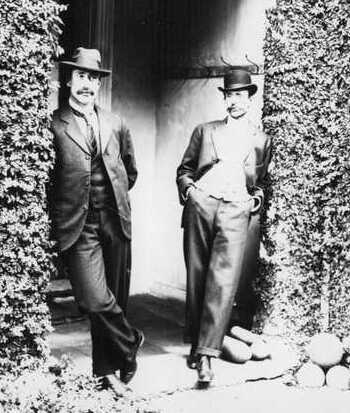
From left: Archibald Logan and Robert Logan Junior at Kawau Island in 1899

In approximately 1890 Archibald Logan and his brother Robert Logan (Junior), the sons of local boat builder Robert Logan (Senior), set up in a boatbuilding business as R. & A. Logan on land reclaimed for the freezing works on the city side of Waitemata Harbour. In 1892 they were joined by their brother John, and the firm became known as Logan Brothers. While Robert looked after the office, John and Archibald were the shipwrights, with 5 apprentices working under them.

Their business became very successful, and from 1898 they began exporting yachts to Australia, South Africa and the Pacific region. Their keel yachts were especially sought after but they built a large number of centreboard craft, pleasure launches and commercial craft as well.

The business was known for their use of frameless diagonally planked two and three-skinned boats made of kauri (Agathis australis). The resulting hulls were extraordinarily long-lived, being highly resistant to rot and damage.

== Closing of the Business ==
In 1910 Logan Brothers closed their business after accepting compensation (believed to be in the order of £8000) from the Auckland Harbour Board for the surrender of the remaining 8 years of their lease on the Auckland waterfront to allow the construction of King's Wharf and the King's Wharf Power Station.

The brothers went separate ways. Robert and John entered the house building industry. Archibald Logan continued to build boats, but at a slower pace and increasingly began concentrating on the design side.

== Notable vessels ==
=== Gloriana ===
Launched on 14 November 1892, Gloriana was built on spec by the three brothers in their spare time to be campaigned themselves. Gloriana dominated everything on the Waitemata Harbour and brought the new firm a lot of business. The 10.36-metre gaff cutter was a scaled down version of the Nat Herreschoff designed Gloriana and incorporated all the latest thinking of the brothers.

=== Thelma ===
Thelma was the Logan Brothers’ first really large yacht, was built for marine merchants William and Alfred Jagger. Designed by Arch Logan, then only 32, she was launched from the Logans’ yard on 30 October 1897. Thelma immediately became the scratch boat on the Waitemata, eclipsing the two former heavyweights Viking and the Sydney cutter/yawl Volunteer.

=== Rainbow ===
Rainbow is a 36-rater cruiser/racer launched on 7 November 1898 for Auckland dentist A.T. Pittar for racing in Australia where she won the 1900 Inter-Colonial Regatta, to become the first New Zealand Yacht to win an international regatta. Restored in 2007 she is now part of Auckland's Classic yacht Fleet and is currently owned by Brad Butterworth, Hamish Ross, Chris Bouzaid and David Glen.

=== Ariki ===
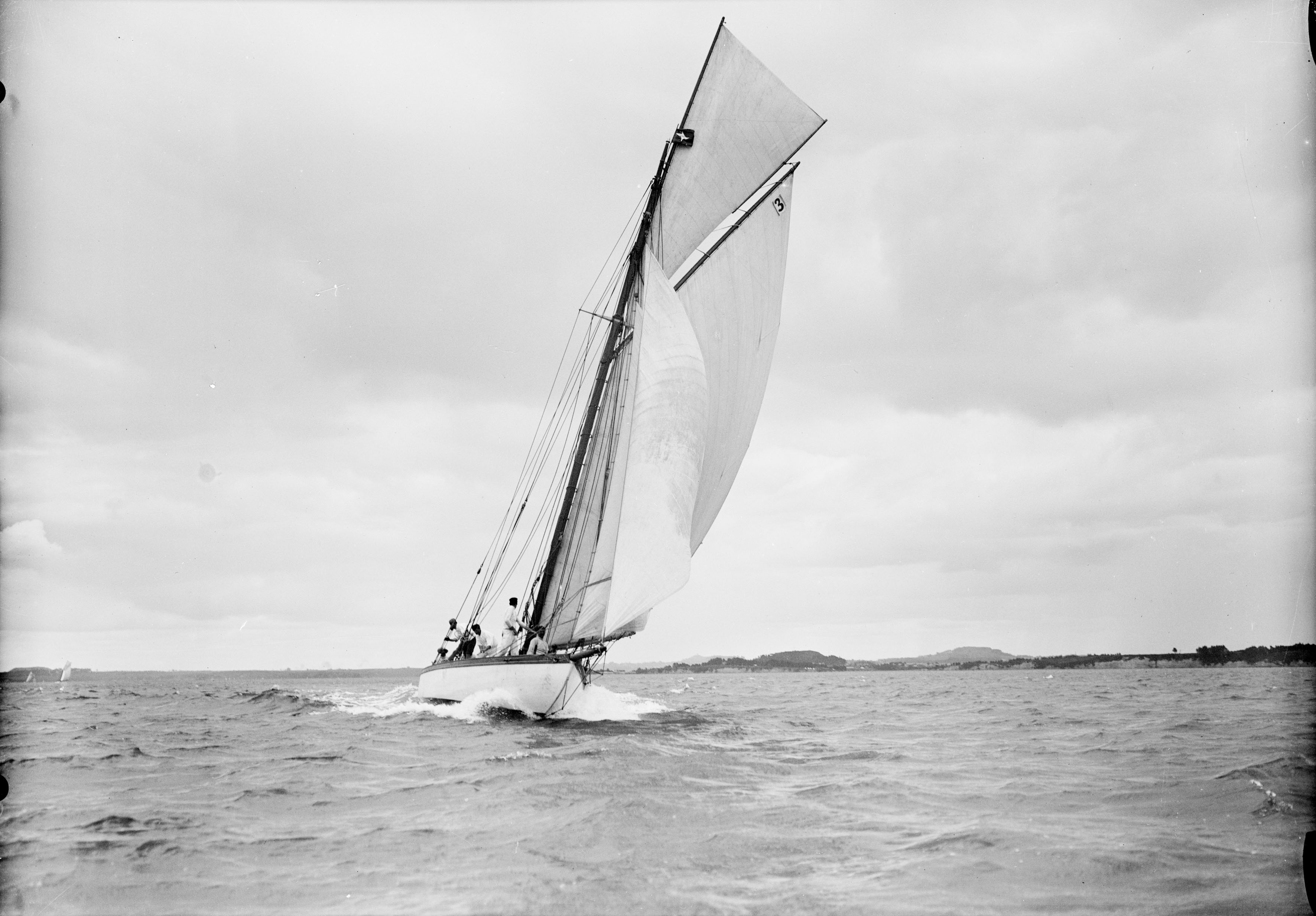
The Ariki sailing in the 1905 Auckland Anniversary Regatta, shortly after being launched

Launched on 20 October 1904, this keel cutter was built for Charles Horton and dominated Auckland yacht racing for the next 35 years. She is now owned by Andrew Barnes and Charlotte Lockhart who completed a full restoration from 2016 to 2018

=== Iorangi ===
Launched on 15 September 1901, this keel sloop was built for A. H. Turnbull of Wellington.

=== Rawhiti ===
Launched on 4 October 1905 this keel cutter with a LOA of 54 ft (16.45m) was built for A.T. Pittar of Sydney as a replacement for his yacht Rainbow.

=== Rawene ===
Launched on 24 December 1908 this keel cutter with an LOA of 42 ft 6in (12.95m) was built for Alfred Gifford. This was the last large yacht built by the Logan Brothers.

=== Other notable boats ===
- Corinna (1893)
- Moana (Launched 14 November 1895), a keel cutter built for W.R Wilson and F.R. Wilson.
- Mahaki (1895).
- Windward (1896).
- Kotiri (Launched 18 October 1897), a keel cutter built for Percy Dufaur.
- Mercia (1898) This yacht was very successful racing in Sydney, which attracted attention of South African yachtsmen. In October 1904 she exported her to Durban and sold to Dan Taylor who renamed her Ibis.
- Rainbow (Launched 7 November 1898) a keel cutter built for A.T. Pittar.
- Aoma (1899).
- Merlin (1899), a mullet boat designed by A.G. Buchanan.
- Heather (1901).
- Iorangi (1901).
- Iolanthe (1901).
- Culwulla (1901), built for prominent Sydney yachtsman, lawyer and parliamentarian, Walter Marks, the Vice Commodore of Royal Prince Alfred Yacht Club, in Sydney. Subsequently renamed Yeulba.
- Aoma II(1902).
- Ilex. (Launched May 1903). This cutter after being renamed Tu'uakitau and then Tuaikaepau was lost in dramatic circumstances in 1962.
- Frances(1906), a keel cutter built for Robert Shakespear.
- Victory (1906), a snapper boat built for fish merchants Jagger & Harvey.
- Maroondah (1907).
- Celox (Launched November 1908), a mullet boat built to Tom Percy.

Logan Brothers also designed and built motorised launches.

== Bibliography ==
- Elliot, Robin; Kidd, Harold (2001). The Logans: New Zealand's Greatest Boat Building Family (Paperback). Auckland: David Ling Publishing Ltd. ISBN 978-0-90899-075-7.
- Elliot, Robin; Kidd, Harold; Pardon, David (1999). Southern Breeze - A History of Yachting in New Zealand (Hardback). Auckland: Penguin Books. ISBN 0-670-88650-5.
- Holmes, Noel (1971). Century of Sail - Official History of the Royal New Zealand Yacht Squadron (Hardback). Wellington: Whitcombe and Tombs. ISBN 0-7233-0305-3.
- Titchener, Paul (1978). Little Ships of New Zealand (Hardback). Wellington: A.H & A.W. Reed. ISBN 0-589-01068-9.
- Wilkins, Ivor (2010). Classic - The Revival of Classic Boating in New Zealand (Hardback). Auckland: Random House. ISBN 978-1-86962-162-9.
