= Olaf Petersen (photographer) =

New Zealand photographer (1915–1994)

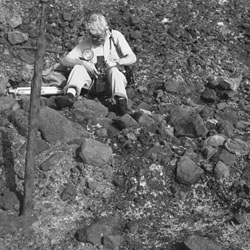
- Born: 13 February 1915; Swanson, Auckland, New Zealand
- Died: 12 September 1994 (aged 79); Auckland
- Occupation: Photographer

Olaf Petersen (13 February 1915 – 12 September 1994) was a New Zealand photographer who specialised in nature photography. The main subject of his photos are the islands of the Hauraki Gulf and the beaches of West Auckland.

== Biography ==
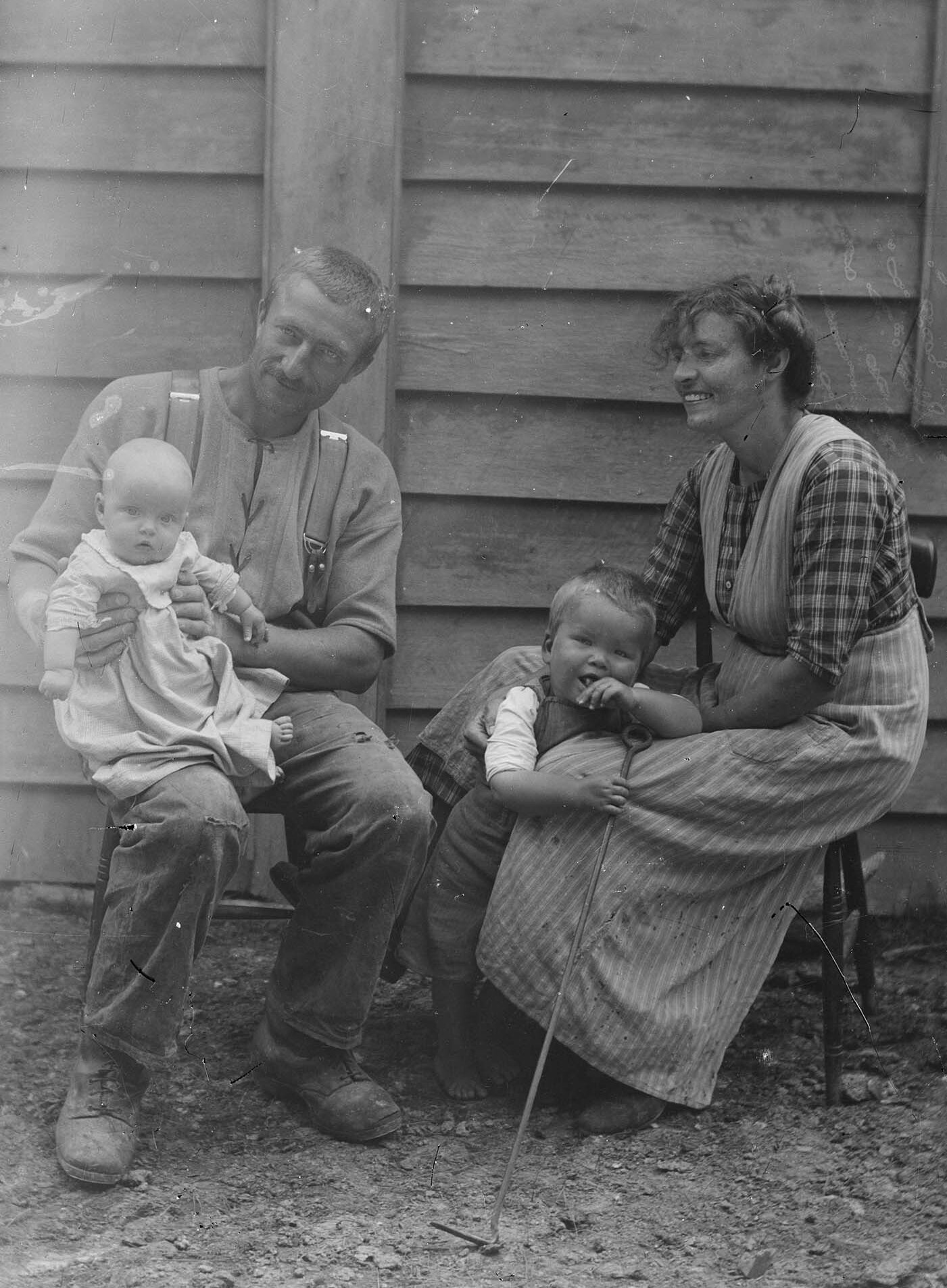
Petersen as a baby (left), with his parents George and Ester Petersen and sister Birgette. Photographed by Henry Winkelmann, c. 1917

Petersen was born on 13 February 1915 in Swanson in West Auckland. His mother Ester was Swedish, and his father Jorgen (commonly known as George in New Zealand) was Danish, and the pair had immigrated to New Zealand in 1913, settling on a farm. The family's dairy and poultry farm was successful, leading to the family buying more land and expanding the farm.

Petersen's main influence for becoming a photographer was his mother Ester, who he often saw developing glass slides at their family home. Ester had likely started photography due to family friend and fellow Swanson resident Henry Winkelmann, who photographed the family when Petersen was young. Petersen was also influenced by his teacher, William Neilson Ingram, the schoolmaster for Swanson School, who was a photographer for school events.

Petersen first started using cameras in 1933, and in 1935 he joined the Auckland Camera Club (later known as the Auckland Photographic Society), and in the following year began entering photography competitions at A&P shows. By 1937, Petersen was fully invested in photography as a serious hobby.

In 1953, Petersen became a professional photographer and captured the Queen's visit to Henderson for the Weekly News. He also continued to take photographs for the New Zealand Herald and Weekly News, and was a frequent contributor to many other New Zealand magazines.

Petersen shot one of his most memorable photographs in January 1952. Entitled I'm Late, the photograph depicted a running karoro (southern black-backed gull) at Muriwai, winning a prize in the William Davies Memorial Salon (Natural History) 1956. In 1961, Petersen, won joint first prize in the Teal 21st Anniversary Photographic Competition for Morning Calm, a shot taken of Milford Sound / Piopiotahi at dawn. By 1962, Petersen had become a judge for Photographic Society of New Zealand competitions. The success of Petersen's nature photography coincided with the rise of Tramping in New Zealand, as both a socially acceptable past-time and as a part of the national image of New Zealand.

While Petersen's works were well received in magazine publications, there were few opportunities for photographers to stage exhibitions of their works until the 1970s, as it was seen as a lesser art form in New Zealand. Petersen's photographs were exhibited during Expo '70 in Osaka. In 1972, Petersen won the New Zealand Photographic Society's Maadi Cup which is given to the 'best photograph of the year for his piece 'So Lonely'. In 1982 a short film was made for television about Olaf's work called Olaf's Coast. This was aired on Kaleidoscope in October 1982.

Petersen was a life member of the Auckland Photographic Society and a member of the University of Auckland Field Club. It was on these trips where Petersen took many of his nature photographs. Throughout his life, Petersen documented events for the Swanson community, such as school galas, birthdays and weddings. In 1988, Petersen gifted his photographic archive to the Auckland War Memorial Museum in 1988. He died in 1994. In Petersen's own words, photography was, 'painting with light' and 'being in the right place at the right time'.

== Legacy ==
In 2020, Olaf Petersen's photographic collection was added to the UNESCO Memory of the World Aotearoa New Zealand Ngā Mahara o te Ao register. In 2022, a survey exhibition was presented by Auckland War Memorial Museum, curated by Shaun Higgins, accompanied by a substantial book published by Auckland University Press with contributions from Higgins, Sandra Coney, Sarah Hillary, Andrew Clifford and Kirstie Ross.

== Personal life ==
Petersen lived in Swanson for his entire life. In the early 1970s, he married Clara Wylie at the age of 57.

== Bibliography ==
- Adam, Jack; Burgess, Vivien; Ellis, Dawn (2004). Rugged Determination: Historical Window on Swanson 1854–2004. Swanson Residents and Ratepayers Association Inc. ISBN 0-476-00544-2.
- Clifford, Andrew (2022). "Painting with Light". In Hammond, Catherine; Higgins, Shaun (eds.). Nature Boy: The Photography of Olaf Petersen. Auckland University Press. pp. 88–123. ISBN 978-1-86940-950-0.
- Higgins, Shaun (2022). "Nature Boy". In Hammond, Catherine; Higgins, Shaun (eds.). Nature Boy: The Photography of Olaf Petersen. Auckland University Press. pp. 14–87. ISBN 978-1-86940-950-0.
- Ross, Kirstie (2022). "Knowing Nature through a Viewfinder". In Hammond, Catherine; Higgins, Shaun (eds.). Nature Boy: The Photography of Olaf Petersen. Auckland University Press. pp. 124–161. ISBN 978-1-86940-950-0.
