= Andrew Barnes (businessman) =

New Zealand-based entrepreneur and philanthropist

Andrew Barnes ONZM
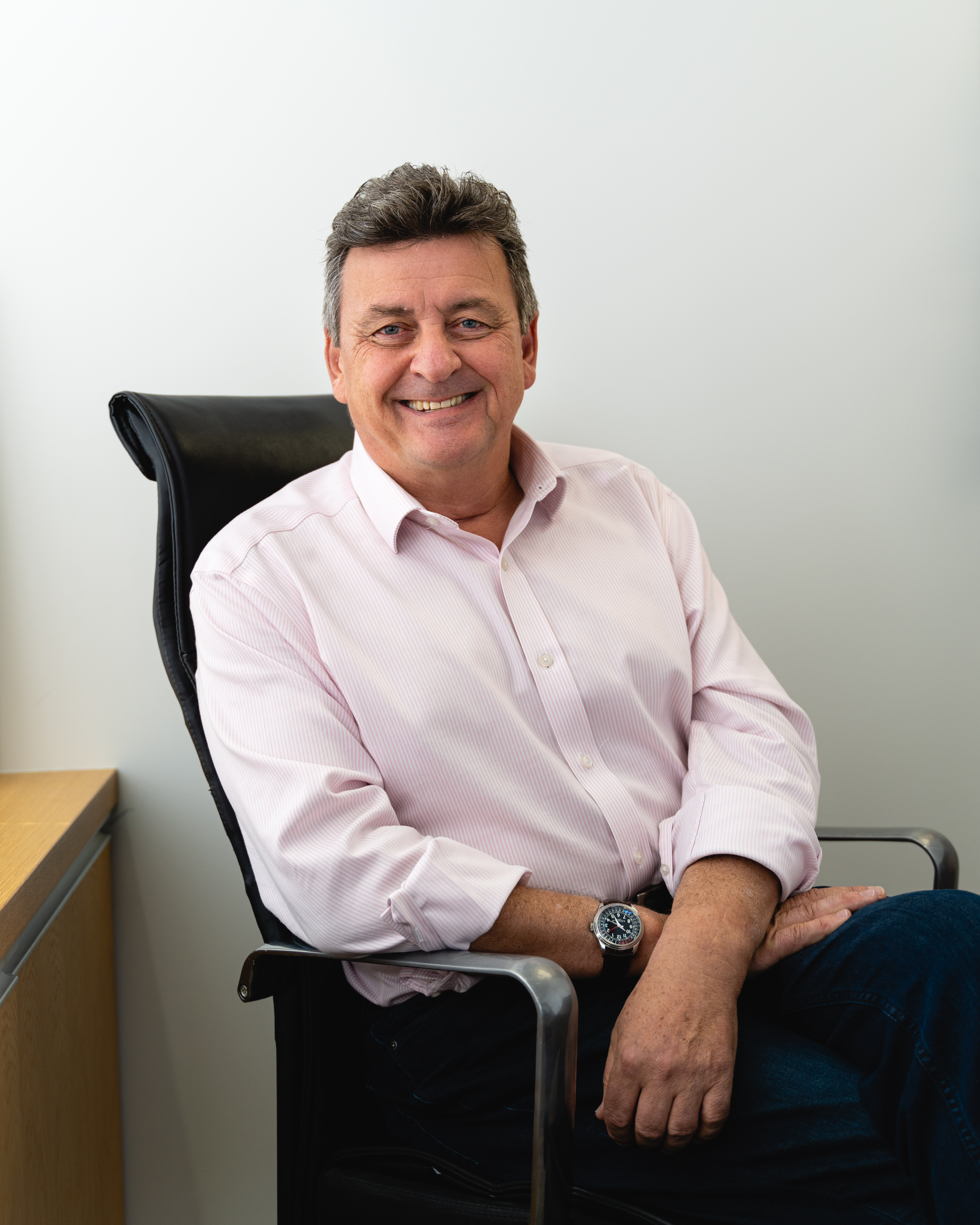
- Barnes at the 4 Day Week Global
- Born: Andrew Howard Barnes; 5 February 1960 (age 66); Carlisle, England
- Citizenship: New Zealand
- Education: Hutton Grammar School, University of Cambridge
- Occupation: Businessman
- Known for: Four-day workweek advocacy

Andrew Howard Barnes ONZM (born 5 February 1960) is a New Zealand-based businessman and workplace reform advocate. He is the founder of Perpetual Guardian and is known for promoting the four-day working week following a 2018 trial at the company.

Barnes is a co-founder of the organisation 4 Day Week Global, which promotes reduced working hours and flexible work practices. He has also contributed to public discussion on productivity and urban economic development in New Zealand.

In the 2024 King's Birthday Honours, Barnes was appointed an Officer of the New Zealand Order of Merit, for services to business and philanthropy. In 2024 he was appointed as a board member of The King’s Trust Aotearoa NZ.

== Education ==
Barnes attended Hutton Grammar School before studying at the University of Cambridge, where he was a member of Selwyn College and completed a Master of Arts degree in law and archaeology in 1981.

He is an Associate of the Chartered Institute of Bankers and attended the Program for Management Development at Harvard Business School in 1992.

== Career ==
Barnes began his career in financial services in the United Kingdom before moving to Australia in his late 20s.

He spent approximately two decades in Australia, where he held senior roles in financial services companies including Macquarie Bank, Citibank, Tower, and County NatWest. During this period, he was involved in the listing of realestate.com.au on the Australian Securities Exchange in 1999.

Barnes later returned to the United Kingdom, where he served as a director of Bestinvest.

=== New Zealand and Perpetual Guardian ===
In 2013, Barnes acquired Perpetual Trust in New Zealand. In 2014, he founded Complectus and acquired Guardian Trust, combining the businesses to form Perpetual Guardian.

In 2015, Complectus acquired the digital estate planning platform My Bucket List and later that year acquired Foundation Corporate Trust.

In 2020, Perpetual Guardian acquired the crowdfunding platform Givealittle from the Spark Foundation.

In 2021, Barnes oversaw the sale of Guardian Trust and Covenant to the Hong Kong-based firm Tricor.

In 2024, Perpetual Guardian Group acquired the private wealth division of Trustees Executors.

=== Governance roles ===
Barnes has held governance positions including chair of Regional Facilities Auckland and chair of the payroll software company PaySauce.

=== COVID-19 response ===
During the COVID-19 pandemic in New Zealand, Barnes advocated for legal changes to allow the use of digital signatures on wills during lockdown restrictions.

== Four-day week trial and advocacy ==
In 2018, Barnes announced that the New Zealand trust company Perpetual Guardian would trial a four-day working week, with employees receiving an additional day off on full pay without increasing working hours.

Following the trial, the company reported improvements in employee work–life balance and reductions in stress levels, alongside stable productivity. The policy was subsequently adopted on a permanent basis.

The trial attracted international media attention and contributed to wider discussion of the four-day week as a model for improving productivity and employee wellbeing.

Barnes later co-founded the advocacy organisation 4 Day Week Global, which promotes shorter working weeks internationally. The organisation runs pilot programmes enabling businesses worldwide to trial reduced working hours and was recognised by TIME magazine in its 2023 TIME100 list of the world’s most influential companies.

He has also written and spoken on the subject, including in his 2020 book The 4 Day Week.

== Philanthropy ==
Barnes has been involved in philanthropic initiatives in New Zealand. As chief executive of Perpetual Guardian, he established the Perpetual Guardian Foundation, which pools small donations for causes including food security, education, the arts, and environmental protection.

Perpetual Guardian has sponsored educational programs, including visits by 3,500 children from rural or low-decile schools to Otago Museum's planetarium. In 2018, the company provided financial support for the Auckland Primary Schools Music Festival.

Barnes has also contributed to research and historical preservation. He established the NZ Bomber Command Fund to support initiatives related to the legacy of the Bomber Command in New Zealand, and collaborated with MOTAT on related exhibitions and archival projects.

He has supported legislative initiatives, including assisting the Funeral Directors Association of NZ with advocacy to allow funeral directors to make final arrangements for individuals without wills.

Barnes has participated in cultural preservation initiatives, including the restoration of the 1904 Auckland-built racing yacht Ariki in 2017. During the COVID-19 pandemic, he provided funding for a virtual Poppy Appeal run by the RSA.

He has donated to Museum of New Zealand Te Papa Tongarewa, supporting improvements to accessibility along the Toi Art walkway. Barnes also commissioned a sculpture at the British High Commission in Wellington, created by Anton Forde in collaboration with Te Āti Awa.

Barnes is a trustee and benefactor of the New Zealand Memorial Museum Trust, which established the New Zealand Liberation Museum (Musée Néo-Zélandais de la Libération, Le Quesnoy, France; Māori: Te Arawhata) to preserve the history of New Zealand soldiers involved in the liberation of Le Quesnoy in 1918.

== Public commentary and media appearances ==
=== Future of work and productivity ===
Barnes has been an active commentator on productivity, flexible work, and the future of work. He has written and spoken extensively on the four-day week, including his 2020 book The 4 Day Week, keynote presentations at conferences, and international interviews.

He has appeared on international media, including the TED conference.

=== Auckland CBD and urban policy ===
Barnes has also publicly commented on Auckland's central business district (CBD), proposing strategies for revitalising the area, improving safety, and reimagining commercial space to attract residents and visitors.

His views have been reported in national media outlets, including discussions on stadium strategies and urban planning responses following COVID-19 lockdowns.

== Honours and awards ==
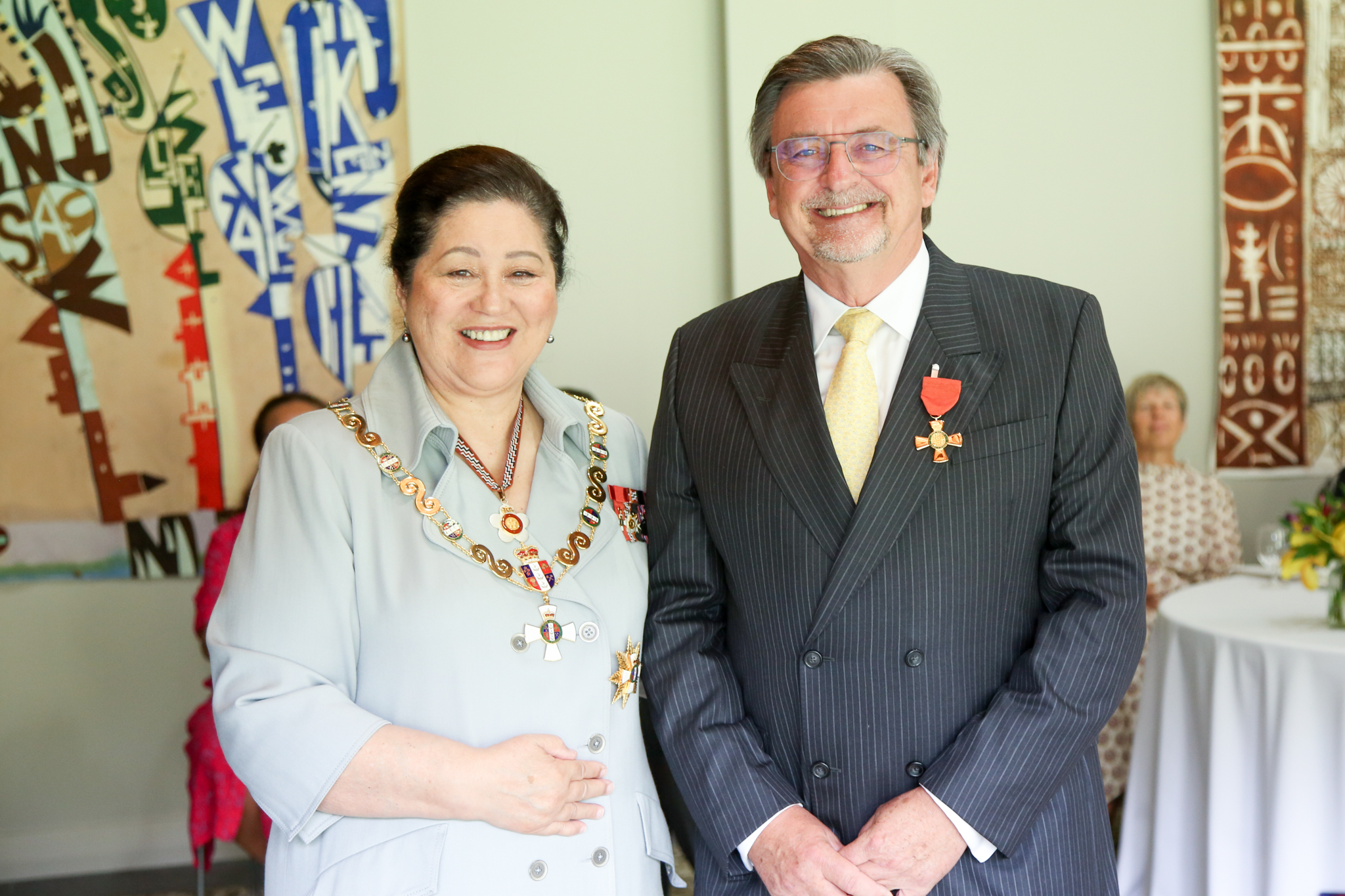
Barnes (right), after his investiture as an Officer of the New Zealand Order of Merit by the governor-general, Dame Cindy Kiro, at Government House, Auckland, on 26 September 2024

Barnes was a finalist in the New Zealand EY Entrepreneur of the Year awards in 2015 and 2016.

In the 2024 King's Birthday Honours, Barnes was appointed an Officer of the New Zealand Order of Merit (ONZM), for services to business and philanthropy.

=== Other recognition ===
In 2022, Barnes and 4 Day Week Global were featured in Forbes’ “Special Report: The Future of Work.”

Barnes serves on the advisory boards of several local 4 Day Week campaigns, as well as the advisory board of the Wellbeing Research Centre at University of Oxford.
