= Mullet boat =

Boat used to fish mullet

Mullet boats are small, basic fishing vessels often used by inshore fishers. The boats are often 20–25 ft in length and have flat bottoms allowing for shallow-water navigation. From the back of the boat, nets such as seines can be deployed and retrieved to haul in catch. Originally developed to support mullet fishers in the Auckland, New Zealand area in the late 1800s, the boats have expanded in purpose, and are now used to catch multiple species and even as pleasure craft.
