= Day and Night =

Day and Night and its variants may refer to:

== Film and TV ==
- Day and Night (1997 film) (Le jour et la nuit), a French drama directed by Bernard-Henri Lévy
- Day and Night (2004 Chinese film) (日日夜夜), directed by Wang Chao
- Day and Night (2004 Swedish film) (Dag och natt), directed by Simon Staho
- Day & Night (2010 film), an American animated short film produced by Pixar
- Day and Night (TV series), 2017, directed by Wang Wei

== Music ==
=== Albums ===
- Day and Night (Movietone album), 1997
- Day and Night (Gerd Dudek album), 2012
- Day and Night (Carly Rae Jepsen album), 2026
- Day & Night (Kara EP), 2014, by South Korean girl group Kara
- Day & Night (Fifty Fifty EP) 2025, by South Korean girl group Fifty Fifty
- The Day and the Night, 1997 jazz saxophone album by Roscoe Mitchell
- Day & Night, a Chinese pop album by Janice Vidal, 2005
- Day and Night, a 1985 EP by Scottish rock group Balaam and the Angel

=== Songs ===
- "Day & Night" (Billie Piper song), 2000
- "Day & Night" (Isyss song), 2002
- "Day & Night", by Basshunter from Bass Generation, 2009
- "Day and Night" (Alamat song), 2023
- "Day and Night", by The Drag Set, 1967
- "Day and Night", by The Wackers, 1973
- "Day and Night", by Loona from Hash, 2020
- "Day 'n' Nite", song by Kid Cudi, 2008

== Other uses ==
- Day and Night: Poems 1924-1934, a book by New Zealand poet Ursula Bethell
- Day and Night, a pair of nude sculptures by Jacob Epstein
- Day and Night (cellular automaton)
- Day and Night (M. C. Escher), a 1938 woodcut
- Day and Night (painting), by Rufino Tamayo

== See also ==
- Day for night (disambiguation)
- Le Jour et la Nuit (disambiguation), the French equivalent
- Night and Day (disambiguation)
- Tag und Nacht (disambiguation), the German equivalent
- Daylight
