= Lydia Myrtle Williams =

Teacher and signatory of the 1893 New Zealand Women's Suffrage Petition.

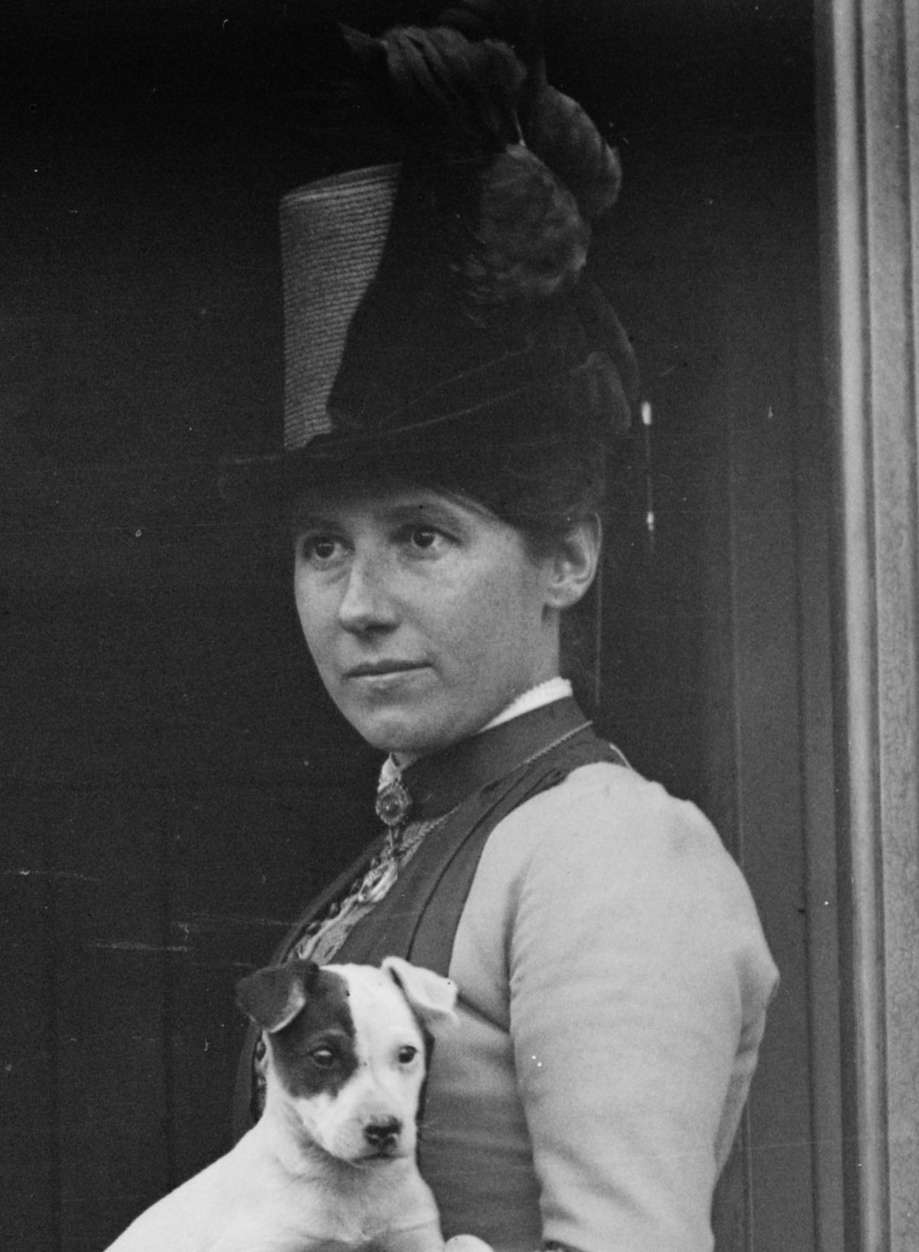
- Born: 1857
- Died: 6 April 1938 (aged 80–81)
- Occupation: Teacher

Lydia Myrtle Williams (née Devereux) was a teacher, and signatory of the 1893 New Zealand Women's Suffrage Petition. She frequently appears in photographs taken by her husband William Williams.

== Early life and family ==
Lydia Myrtle Devereux was the daughter of William Checkley Devereux and Ellen King, of Lower Hutt. William Devereux and Ellen King migrated to New Zealand onboard the ship Myrtle in 1855 and settled in Lower Hutt.

Lydia married William Williams, of Napier an amateur photographer on 1 August 1887 in Lower Hutt.

== Biography ==
Lydia Devereux was a teacher primarily based around the Wellington Region, she worked at a number of schools including Te Aro School. She also worked as a teacher at Mount Cook Girls School. In 1880 Lydia Devereux was appointed head mistress at the Infant School at Thorndon. It was noted that under her charge the school had been 'conducted with efficiency and success.'

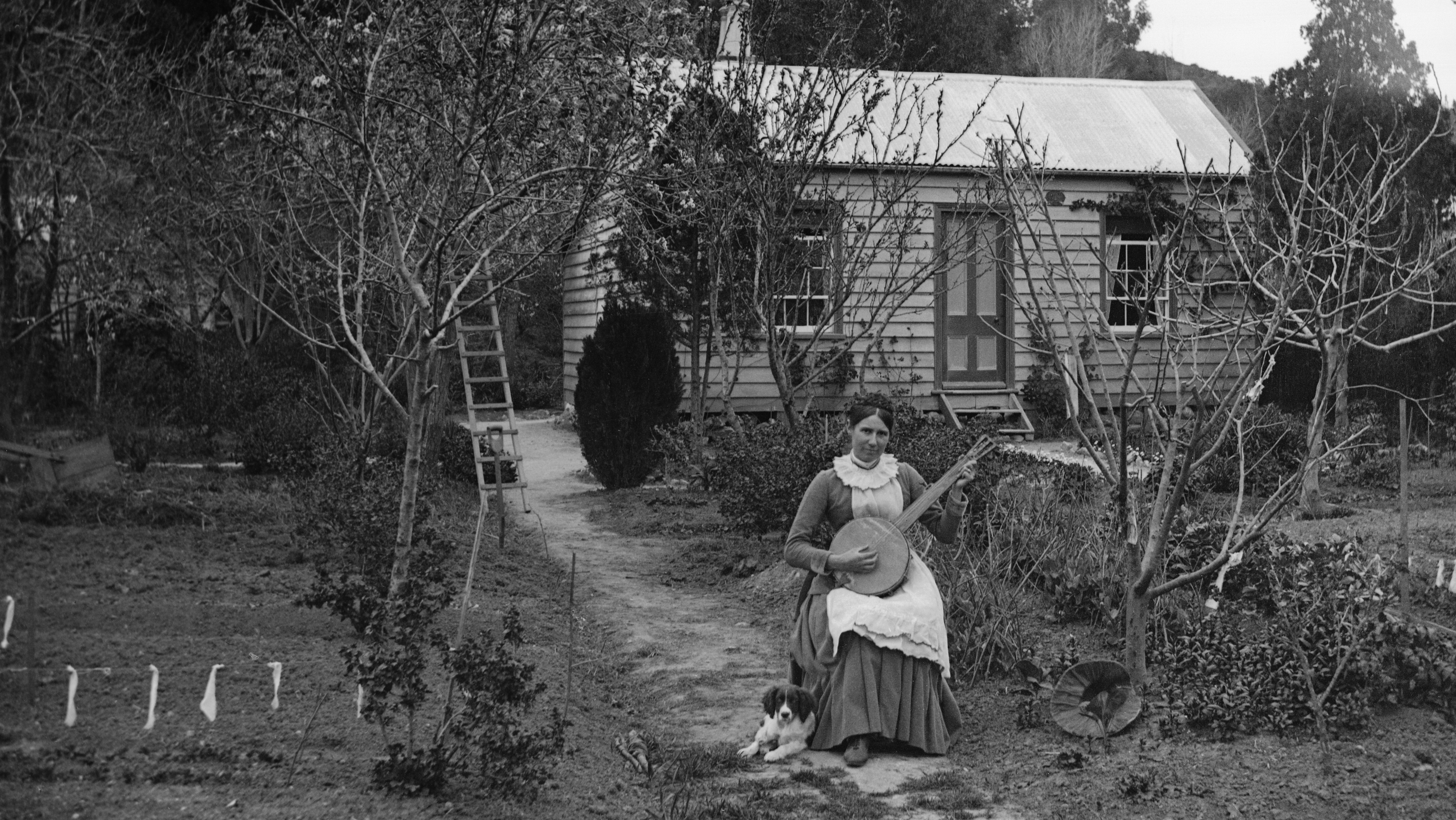
Lydia Williams holding her banjo in the garden outside her Carlyle Street house, Napier (1888)

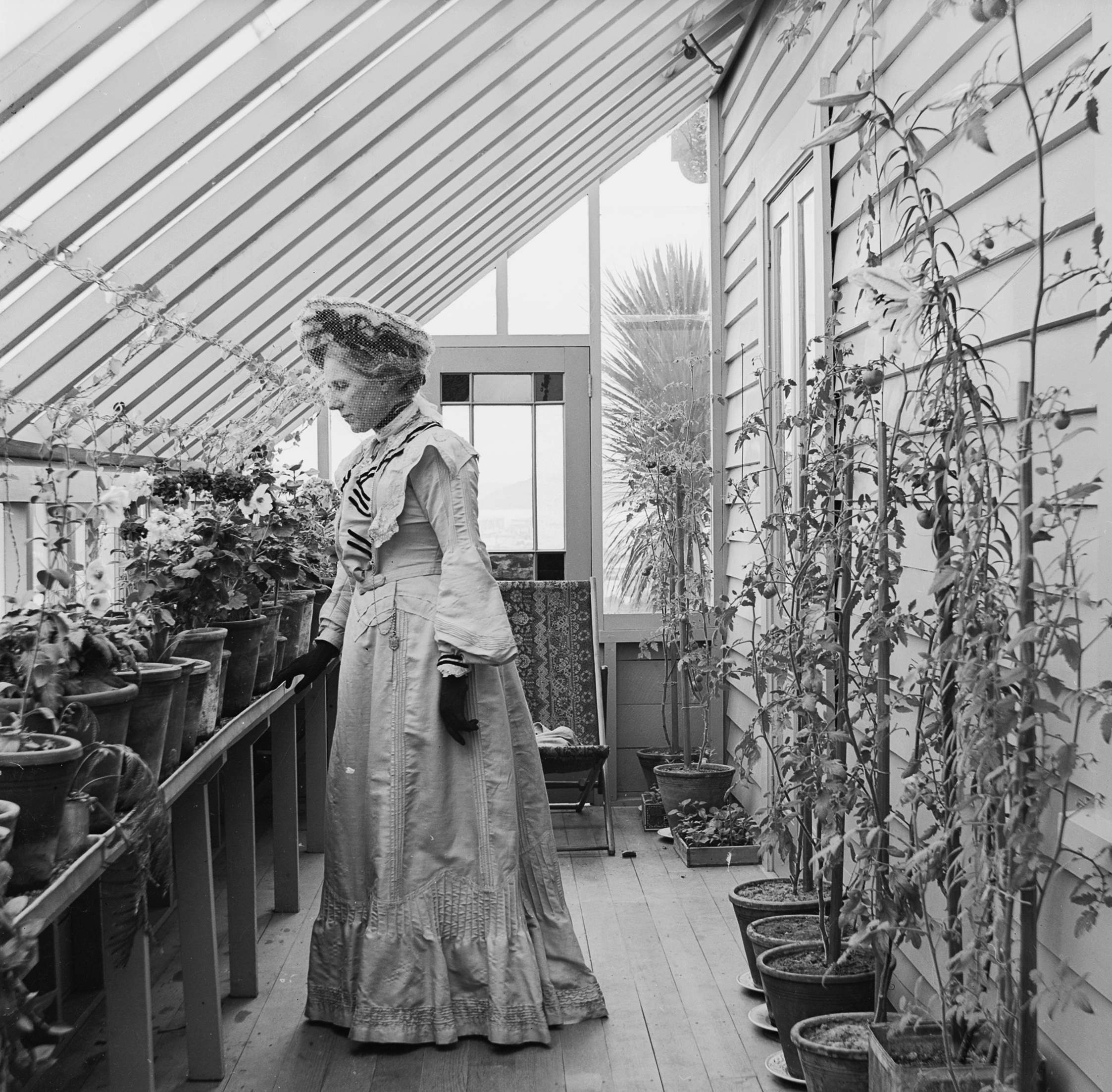
Lydia Williams in the conservatory of her house in Royal Terrace, Kew, Dunedin, 1905

In 1887 Lydia married William Williams of Napier.

Lydia Williams is a signatory of the 1893 New Zealand Women's Suffrage Petition, at the time her given address was Maitland Street, Central Dunedin. Her sister Mary Ellen Devereux also signed the suffrage petition.

Lydia and William Williams had two sons, Edgar Richard born in 1892 and Owen born in 1894. Their son Edgar was also an enthusiastic photographer and maintained his father's collection of photographs, this collection of photographs was donated to the National Library. The photographs feature Wellington in the 1880s, Napier in the late 1880s–1890s, Dunedin and The Catlins in the late 1890s to 1900s. Lydia Myrtle Williams also frequently appears in her husbands' photographs and has been described as his muse. Photographs of Lydia were featured in an exhibition at the Alexander Turnbull Library in the 1990s.

Lydia died on 6 April 1938, her ashes were scattered and a plaque was installed at Andersons Bay Cemetery, Dunedin.
