= New Zealand Memory of the World Register =

National register of documentary heritage

The New Zealand Memory of the World Register is a national register of New Zealand's documentary heritage as part of the Memory of the World Programme, maintained by UNESCO Aotearoa New Zealand Memory of the World Trust. As of 2024, it includes 55 different collections and archives.

Four of the heritage items on this list — The Treaty of Waitangi, the 1893 Women's Suffrage Petition, the Sir Edmund Hillary archive, and the Katherine Mansfield literary and personal papers and belongings — are also included on the Memory of the World international register, which highlights documentary heritage of global importance.

== History ==
The Memory of the World Aotearoa New Zealand register was established in 2010.

== List of inscriptions ==
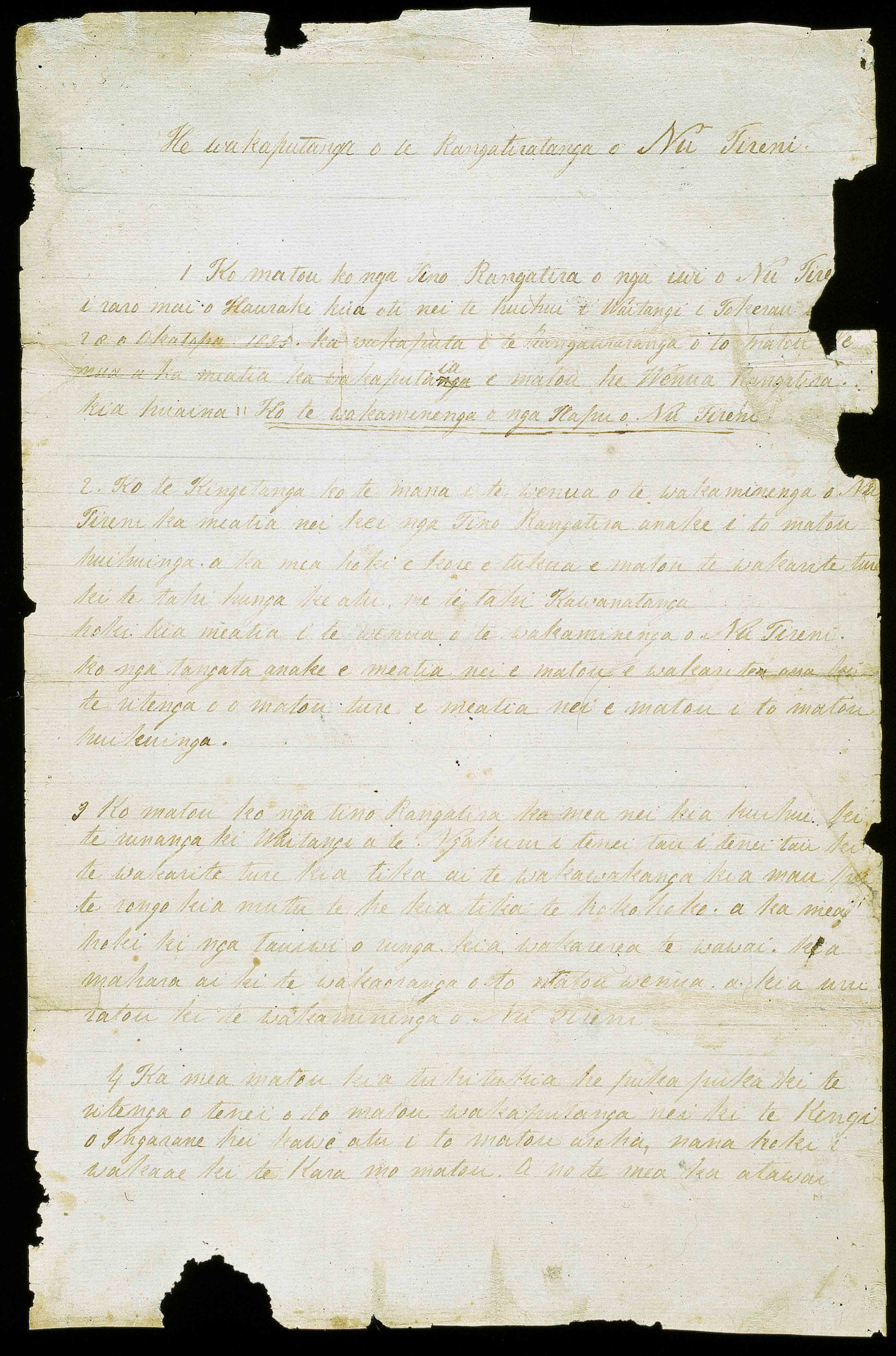
Page one of the He Whakaputanga o te Rangatiratanga o Nu Tireni The Declaration of Independence of the United Tribes of New Zealand

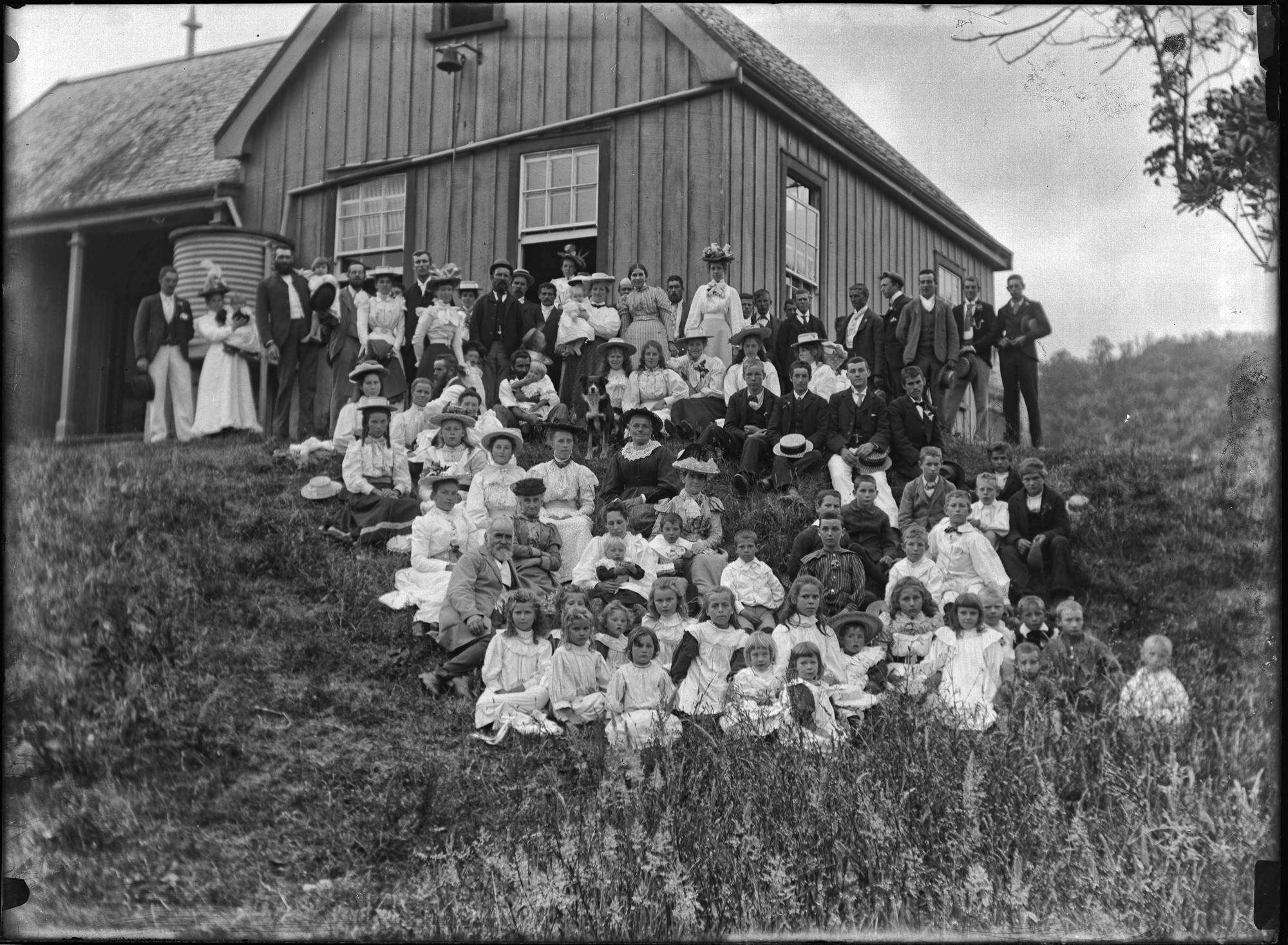
An image of the Waimamaku School picnic of 1900, from the Charles Peet Dawes collection

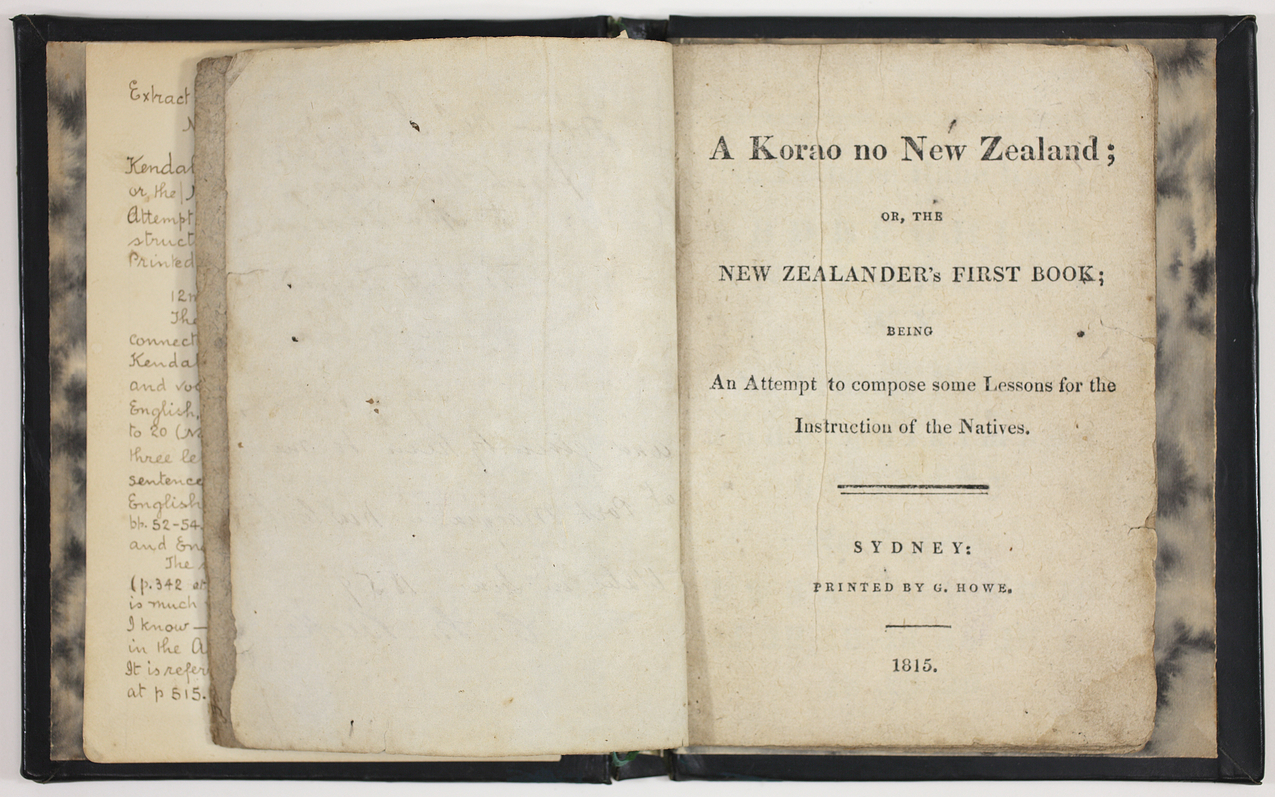
Title page of A korao no New Zealand (1815), the first known book written in Māori

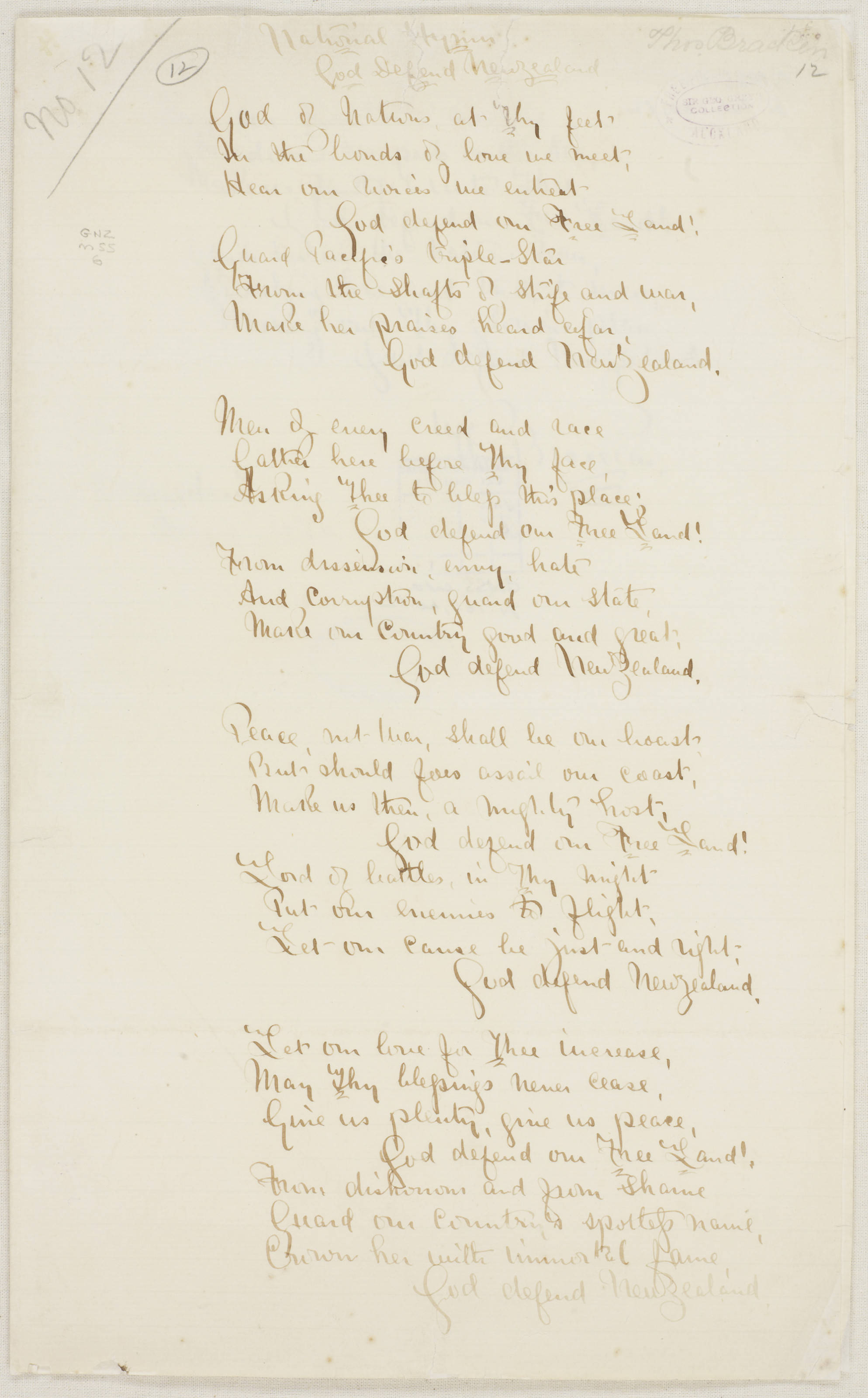
The first page of the original manuscript for God Defend New Zealand, the New Zealand National Anthem

| Documentary heritage^{[A]} | Custodian(s), Location(s) | Year inscribed | Reference |
|---|---|---|---|
| Treaty of Waitangi | Archives New Zealand, Wellington 41°16′37″S 174°46′48″E | 2011 | |
| 1893 Women's Suffrage Petition | Archives New Zealand, Wellington 41°16′37″S 174°46′48″E | 2011 | |
| Tokyo War Crimes | Macmillan Brown Library, University of Canterbury 43°31′24″S 172°35′10″E | 2011 | |
| Overture Aotearoa | Alexander Turnbull Library, Wellington 41°16′36″S 174°46′42″E | 2011 | |
| National Film Unit Weekly Review and Pictorial Parade | Archives New Zealand, Wellington 41°16′38″S 174°46′48″E | 2011 | |
| Grey New Zealand Māori Manuscript Collection | Central City Library, Auckland 36°51′06″S 174°45′55″E | 2011 | |
| Māori Land Court Minute Books | Archives New Zealand, Wellington 41°16′38″S 174°46′48″E | 2012 | |
| Patu! | Ngā Taonga Sound & Vision, Wellington 41°17′37″S 174°46′41″E | 2012 | |
| Sir Edmund Hillary Archive | Auckland War Memorial Museum, Auckland 36°51′37″S 174°46′40″E | 2013 | |
| "God Defend New Zealand" original score and lyrics | Central City Library, Auckland 36°51′06″S 174°45′55″E | 2013 | |
| Charles Brasch Literary and Personal Papers | Hocken Collections, Dunedin 45°52′11″S 170°31′04″E | 2013 | |
| A korao no New Zealand | Auckland War Memorial Museum, Auckland 36°51′37″S 174°46′40″E | 2013 | |
| Mobile Unit—New Zealand Oral History, 1946–48 | Ngā Taonga Sound & Vision, Wellington 41°17′37″S 174°46′41″E | 2014 | |
| Dr Hocken's Church Missionary Society Records | Hocken Collections, Dunedin 45°52′11″S 170°31′04″E | 2014 | |
| Pickerill Papers on Plastic Surgery | Hocken Collections, Dunedin 45°52′11″S 170°31′04″E | 2015 | |
| He Whakaputanga o te Rangatiratanga o Nu Tireni The Declaration of Independence of the United Tribes of New Zealand | Archives New Zealand, Wellington 41°16′38″S 174°46′48″E | 2015 | |
| Katherine Mansfield literary and personal papers and belongings | Alexander Turnbull Library, Wellington 41°16′36″S 174°46′42″E | 2016 | |
| Scottish Migration Collection | Waipu Scottish Migration Museum, Waipu 35°59′02″S 174°26′43″E | 2016 | |
| Lance Richdale Papers | Hocken Collections, Dunedin 45°52′11″S 170°31′04″E | 2016 | |
| Sir John Logan Campbell Papers | Auckland War Memorial Museum, Auckland 36°51′37″S 174°46′40″E | 2016 | |
| John A. Lee Papers | Central City Library, Auckland 36°51′06″S 174°45′55″E | 2017 | |
| The J. T. Diamond West Auckland History Collection | Central City Library, Auckland 36°51′06″S 174°45′55″E | 2017 | |
| New Zealand Official Photographs, World War 1914–1918 | Alexander Turnbull Library, Wellington 41°16′36″S 174°46′42″E | 2017 | |
| Kaleidoscope – a Weekly Television Arts Documentary Programme, 1976–1989 | Ngā Taonga Sound & Vision, Wellington 41°17′37″S 174°46′41″E | 2017 | |
| Salmond Anderson Architects Records | Hocken Collections, Dunedin 45°52′11″S 170°31′04″E | 2017 | |
| Ng New Zealand Chinese Heritage Collection | Presbyterian Research Centre, Knox College, Dunedin 45°51′20″S 170°31′27″E | 2017 | |
| Tyree Studio Collection | Nelson Provincial Museum, Nelson; 41°16′28″S 173°17′01″E: Alexander Turnbull Library, Wellington; 41°16′36″S 174°46′42″E | 2017 | |
| Jack Lovelock Papers | Alexander Turnbull Library, Wellington 41°16′36″S 174°46′42″E | 2018 | |
| Kerikeri Mission Te Reo Slates | Kerikeri Mission Station, Kerikeri 35°13′05″S 173°57′47″E | 2018 | |
| Armson Collins Architectural Drawing Collection | Macmillan Brown Library, University of Canterbury 43°31′24″S 172°35′10″E | 2018 | |
| Cambodian Women Oral History Project | Alexander Turnbull Library, Wellington 41°16′36″S 174°46′42″E | 2018 | |
| Marti Friedlander Archive | Auckland Art Gallery, Auckland 36°51′05″S 174°45′59″E | 2018 | |
| Journals and Papers of Reverend Charles Baker | Auckland War Memorial Museum, Auckland 36°51′37″S 174°46′40″E | 2018 | |
| Herries Beattie Papers (1848–1972) | Hocken Collections, Dunedin 45°52′11″S 170°31′04″E | 2018 | |
| PCANZ Deaconess Collection | Presbyterian Research Centre, Knox College, Dunedin 45°51′20″S 170°31′27″E | 2018 | |
| C P Dawes Collection | Central City Library, Auckland 36°51′06″S 174°45′55″E | 2019 | |
| Dr Muriel Bell Papers | Hocken Collections, Dunedin 45°52′11″S 170°31′04″E | 2019 | |
| Richard Davis Meteorological Records 1839–1851 | Central City Library, Auckland 36°51′06″S 174°45′55″E | 2019 | |
| Sir Julius von Haast Collection | Hocken Collections, Dunedin 45°52′11″S 170°31′04″E | 2019 | |
| World War II New Zealand Mobile Broadcasting Unit Recordings | Ngā Taonga Sound & Vision, Wellington 41°17′37″S 174°46′41″E | 2019 | |
| Crown Purchase Deeds | Archives New Zealand, Wellington 41°16′38″S 174°46′48″E | 2020 | |
| Robin Hyde literary and personal papers | Alexander Turnbull Library, Wellington 41°16′36″S 174°46′42″E | 2020 | |
| Olaf Petersen Collection | Auckland War Memorial Museum, Auckland 36°51′37″S 174°46′40″E | 2020 | |
| Colin and Anne McCahon Papers | Hocken Collections, Dunedin 45°52′11″S 170°31′04″E | 2020 | |
| Suzanne Aubert's 'Manuscript of Māori Conversation' | Nga Whaea Tapu Pūaroha Sisters of Compassion, Wellington 41°19′44″S 174°46′13″E | 2020 | |
| Ursula Bethell Collection | Macmillan Brown Library, University of Canterbury 43°31′24″S 172°35′10″E | 2021 | |
| This Is New Zealand | Archives New Zealand, Wellington 41°16′38″S 174°46′48″E | 2022 | |
| Clendon Papers | Heritage New Zealand, Wellington; 41°17′13″S 174°46′26″E: Central City Library, Auckland; 36°51′06″S 174°45′55″E | 2022 | |
| The letters of Meri Hōhepa Suzanne Aubert | Nga Whaea Tapu Pūaroha Sisters of Compassion, Wellington 41°19′44″S 174°46′13″E | 2022 | |
| The Winkelmann Collection(s) | Central City Library, Auckland; 36°51′06″S 174°45′55″E: Auckland War Memorial Museum, Auckland; 36°51′37″S 174°46′40″E | 2023 | |
| Canterbury Provincial Government Archives 1853–1877 | Archives New Zealand, Christchurch 43°32′39″S 172°32′53″E | 2023 | |
| William Harding Collection | Alexander Turnbull Library, Wellington; 41°16′36″S 174°46′42″E: Whanganui Regional Museum, Whanganui; 39°55′54″S 175°03′07″E: Alexander Heritage & Research Library, Whanganui; 39°55′51″S 175°03′09″E | 2023 | |
| Janet Frame: Literary and Personal Papers | Hocken Collections, Dunedin 45°52′11″S 170°31′04″E | 2024 | |
| Tangata Whenua: The People of the Land | Ngā Taonga Sound & Vision, Wellington 41°17′37″S 174°46′41″E | 2024 | |
| Frank Sargeson Collection | Alexander Turnbull Library, Wellington 41°16′36″S 174°46′42″E | 2024 | |
| William F. Crawford Collection | Tairawhiti Museum, Gisborne | 2025 | |
| The Coates family of Ruatuna | Heritage New Zealand, Wellington; Kauri Museum, Matakohe | 2026 | |
| The Ron Vine Collection | Walsh Memorial Library, Auckland | 2026 | |
| Avis Acres Cartoons and Illustrations Archive | Alexander Turnbull Library, Wellington | 2026 | |

== Notes ==
Names and spellings provided are based on the official list released by the Memory of the World Programme.
