= Days and Nights (disambiguation) =

Days and Nights is a 2013 American drama film based on Chekov's The Seagull

Days and Nights may also refer to:

- Days and Nights (1944 film), a Soviet drama film
- Days and Nights, a short novel by Konstantin Simonov
- Days and Nights, a 1926 work by Nathan Bistritzky
- Days + Nights, a 2014 album by Daley

== See also ==
- Day & Night (disambiguation)
- Nights and Days, a film based on Nights and Days (Noce i dnie) a novel by Maria Dąbrowska
