= Charles Dawes =

Charles Dawes may refer to:

- Charles G. Dawes (1865–1951), 30th vice president of the United States
- Charles Peet Dawes (1867–1947), New Zealand pioneer photographer
- Charlie Dawes (born 1995), English footballer who plays for Worksop Town
