= Macmillan Brown Library =

- Te Puna Rakahau o Macmillan Brown
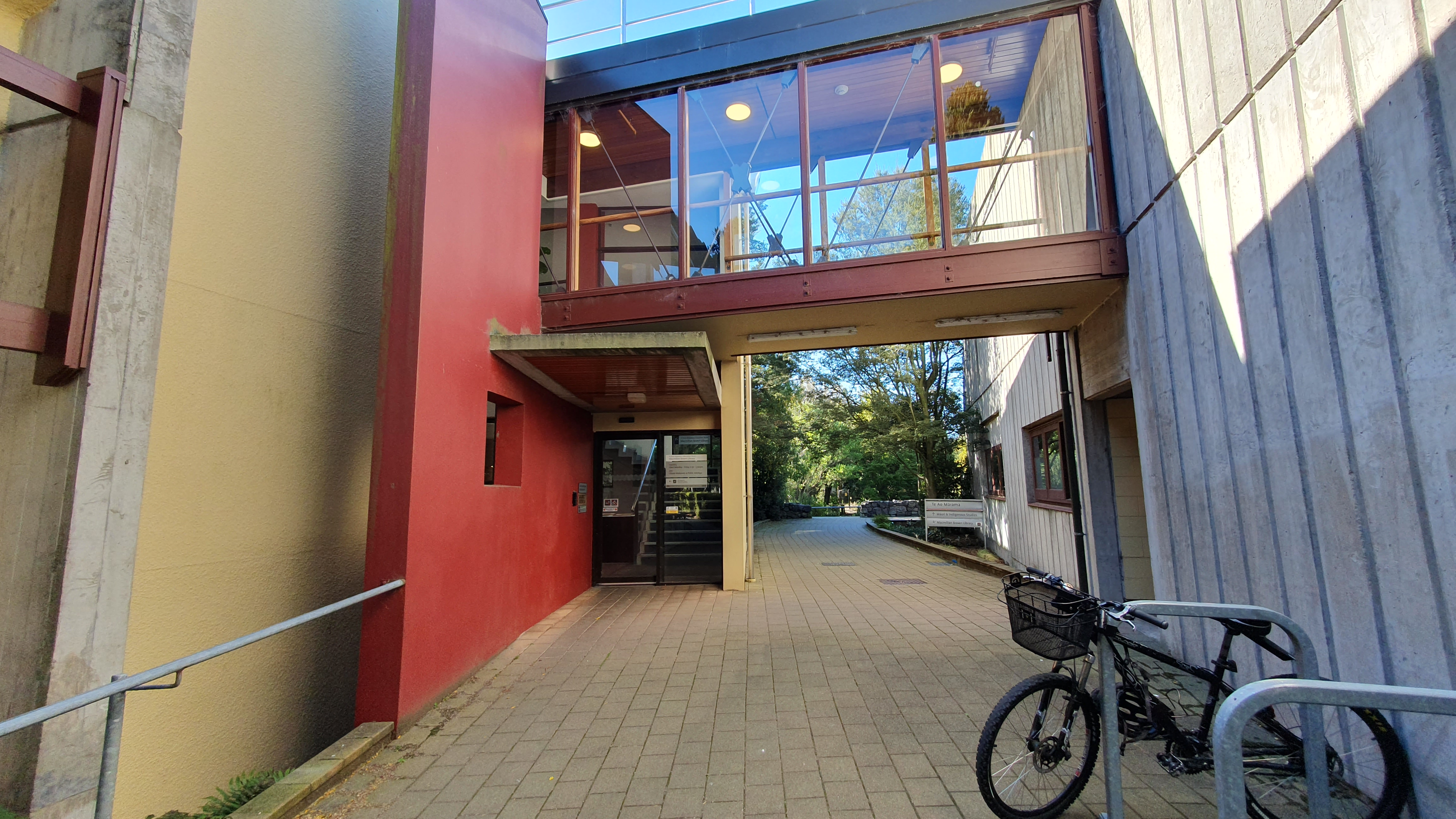
- Entrance to Macmillan Brown Library at the University of Canterbury in 2023.
- Interactive map of the Macmillan Brown Library area

General information
- Coordinates: 43.523459°S 172.585977°E
- Opened: 1935
- Owner: University of Canterbury

The Macmillan Brown Library (also known by its Māori name Te Puna Rakahau o Macmillan Brown) is a research library based in the New Zealand city of Christchurch. It is a library collection of national significance administered by the University of Canterbury.

== Overview ==
The Macmillan Brown Library's collections consist mainly of items relating to Aotearoa New Zealand and the Pacific Islands. It holds over 100,000 published items, over 5,000 linear metres of archival collection (including documentary archives, photographs and architectural drawings), approximately 5,000 artworks, and rare book and modern fine print collections. Some notable items in its collections include copies of Māori Land Court Records, official and government documents from various Pacific Islands states, trade union records, and the personal papers of various Members of Parliament and government ministers. Three archival collections are listed on the UNESCO Memory of the World: The Tokyo War Crimes Trial Collection, the Armson Collins Architectural Drawing Collection and the Ursula Bethell Collection. Its art collection also has over 5,000 works, making it one of the largest collections in the Canterbury region, with a particular focus on Canterbury | Waitaha art and artists, particularly those who have taught or studied at the University of Canterbury.

The Macmillan Brown Library was established in 1935 as a separate collection within the University of Canterbury Library. It was created through the philanthropy of Professor John Macmillan Brown, who was one of the first academics at the newly established Canterbury College in 1874, one of the constituent colleges of the University of New Zealand, which later became the University of Canterbury. In his will he allocated a large proportion of his fortune and his personal collections to the university for the formation of the library.

The library is located within the university's Ilam campus on the second floor of the Te Ao Tūroa building.

== Memories of the World ==
The Justice Erima Harvey Northcroft Tokyo War Crimes Trial Collection is an archival collection held at the library based on the personal papers of Sir Erima Harvey Northcroft, one of the eleven judges on the International Military Tribunal for the Far East. It is notable because in 2009 it was included as one of three New Zealand entries on the UNESCO Memory of the World Aotearoa New Zealand Ngā Mahara o te Ao register. A comprehensive finding aid has been published. Most of the collection is in the form of bound volumes of news-print quality documents.

In 2021, the personal and literary notes of Ursula Bethell, also held at the Macmillan Brown Library, were inscribed on the UNESCO New Zealand Memory of the World Register.
