= Day for Night (disambiguation) =

Day for night is a historic cinematographic technique of shooting night scenes during the day.

Day for Night is a 1973 French romantic comedy-drama film by François Truffaut.

Day for Night may also refer to:

- Day for Night (festival), an art and music festival hosted in Houston, Texas
- "Day for Night", the fourth track on Bryan Ferry's 1987 album Bête Noire
- Day for Night (Spock's Beard album), a 1999 album by American progressive rock band Spock's Beard
- Day for Night (The Tragically Hip album), a 1994 album by Canadian rock band The Tragically Hip
- Day for Night, a 2005 EP by Australian indie pop band The Bank Holidays
- Day for Night, the title of the 2006 Whitney Biennial, an exhibition of contemporary art at the Whitney Museum of American Art in New York City
- "Day for Night", a song by English-Irish music duo Moloko from the album Do You Like My Tight Sweater?

== See also ==
- Day and Night (disambiguation)
