= Night and Day =

Night and Day may refer to:

== Film, theatre, and television ==
- Night and Day (1946 film), an American film based on the life of Cole Porter
- Night and Day (1991 film), a French film directed by Chantal Akerman
- Night and Day (2008 film), a South Korean film directed by Hong Sang-soo
- Night and Day (ballet), an 1883 ballet with choreography by Marius Petipa and music by Ludwig Minkusllet
- Night and Day (play), a 1978 play by Tom Stoppard
- Night and Day (TV series), a British soap opera

== Literature ==
- Night and Day (Parker novel), a 2010 novel by Robert B. Parker
- Night and Day (Woolf novel), a 1919 novel by Virginia Woolf
- Night and Day, a defunct magazine edited by Graham Greene

== Music ==
=== Albums ===
- Night and Day (Joe Jackson album), 1982
- Night and Day (Red Rodney album), 1981
- Night and Day (Vincent Herring album), 2015
- Night and Day (Willie Nelson album), 1999
- Night and Day, by John Davis and the Monster Orchestra, 1976
- Night & Day (Gemma Hayes album), 2014
- Night & Day (Keshia Chanté album), 2011
- Night & Day (The Secret Handshake album), 2010
- Night & Day (The Vamps album), 2017
- Night & Day: Big Band, by Chicago, 1995

=== Songs ===
- "Night and Day" (song), written by Cole Porter, 1932
- "Night and Day" (Bette Midler song), 1990
- "Night and Day" (Dawn Penn song), 1994
- "Night and Day", by Léo Ferré from Il n'y a plus rien, 1973

=== Venues and events ===
- Night and Day Café, a music venue in Manchester, England
- Night and Day Concert, a 1984 performance by Elton John
- Night+Day, a 2013 series of three festival-style concerts held by the xx

== Other ==
- Night and Day, a diamond jewellery brand owned by F. Hinds
- Night 'n Day, a convenience store chain in New Zealand

== See also ==
- Day and Night (disambiguation)
- Zameen Aasmaan (disambiguation)
- Knight and Day, a 2010 film starring Tom Cruise and Cameron Diaz
- Natt och Dag (lit. Night and Day), a Swedish noble family
- Night Time Is the Right Time, a 1957 song by Nappy Brown, covered by Ray Charles in 1958
- Nite and Day, a 1988 song by Al B. Sure!
