= Zameen Aasmaan =

Zameen Aasmaan (lit. 'Earth and Sky'; transl. Night and Day) may refer to:

- Zameen Aasmaan (1946 film), a 1946 Indian film directed by Dwarka Khosla
- Zameen Aasmaan (1972 film), a 1972 Indian Hindi-language action film directed by A. Veerappan
- Zameen Aasmaan (1984 film), a 1984 Indian drama film directed by Bharat Rangachary
- Zameen Aasman, a 1994 Pakistani action film directed by Hasnain

== See also ==
- Zameen (disambiguation)
- Night and Day (disambiguation)
- Zameen Se Aassman Tak, a 2004 Indian TV series
