= Charles Peet Dawes =

New Zealand photographer

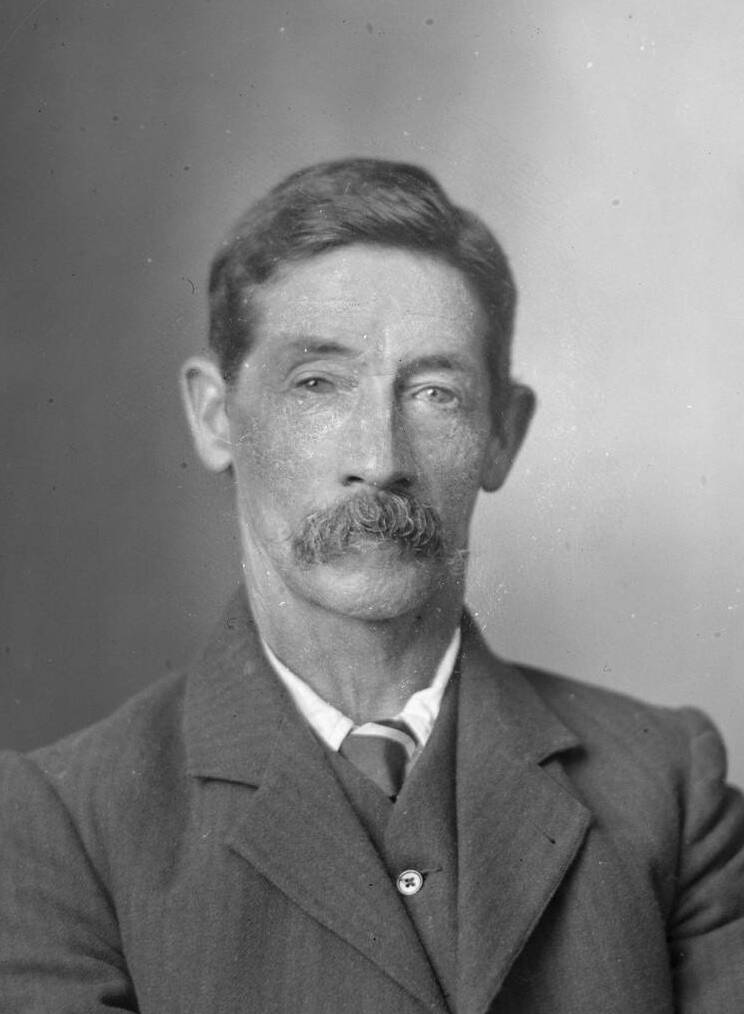
- Self-portrait by Dawes c. 1910s
- Born: 1867; Swadlincote, England
- Died: 1947 (aged 79–80)
- Occupation: Photographer

Charles Peet Dawes (1867 – 1947), also known as Charlie Dawes, was an early New Zealand photographer. Based at Kohukohu in Northland, Dawes documented the communities of the Hokianga Harbour area between the 1880s and the 1920s, and was one of the few photographers who photographed the 1898 Dog Tax War.

While Dawes saw little recognition during his lifetime, his work became more prominent in the 21st century, forming part of the Drummond-Te Wake Collections of the Whangārei Art Museum. His photographic collections held at Auckland Libraries being added to the UNESCO Memory of the World Aotearoa New Zealand Ngā Mahara o te Ao register in 2019. Dawes' work has been exhibited by Auckland Libraries, the Te Ahu Centre in Kaitaia and the Te Kōngahu Museum of Waitangi.

== Early years ==
Dawes was born in Swadlincote, England in 1867. He arrived in New Zealand in February 1879 when his family emigrated from England. The Dawes family likely originally intended to settle at Timaru, however due to the Special Village Settlement Scheme of 1886 which provided leasehold land to settlers, the family moved to Kohukohu in Northland, where Dawes purchased land.

== Career ==
Dawes worked various jobs in Kohukohu, including a mailman, carrier, night soil collector, farmer and orchardist. Town records indicate that Dawes was a vestryman at the local church, and performed in the annual Kohukohu Christmas pantomimes.

By 1888, Dawes had begun taking photographs, and is thought to have taken his first commission as a professional photographer around the year 1892. Dawes began advertising himself as a professional photographer from the early 1900s. Dawes kept in contact with other pioneer photographers in the wider area, including New Zealand Herald photographer William Gordon-Jones, Daniel Mapowder Warren, of whom Dawes took the only known photographs of, and Enos Pegler, who appeared to assist Dawes with connections for his images to be published in newspapers.

Dawes' photographs focused on the Hokianga Harbour area communities and included many portraits of his own family members. Dawes was one of the few photographers to document the Dog Tax War of 1898, which were published in the New Zealand Graphic. The New Zealand Graphic and Auckland Weekly News published several other photographs of Dawes, but for the most part, many of his photographs had little commercial value.

Dawes ran his photographic studio until the mid-1920s. During this time period, Dawes purchased an 100 acres (40 ha) farm on Te Tio Road at Umawera and moved there with his family.

== Death and legacy ==
Dawes died in 1947, leaving many of his possessions to his son Earle Dawes, including his Umawera farm, camera equipment and negative collection, and the Kohukohu family home to his daughter Christina. Earle eventually left for Tutamoe, taking many of Dawes' negatives with him, but leaving large amounts behind. Earle was visited by historian Ron Halliday later in his life, who recognised the importance of the negative collection, which were later purchased by Northland historian Ben Te Wake. After Te Wake's death, the Northern Advocate worked together with the Whangārei Art Museum to create the Drummond-Te Wake Collections, which includes Dawes' photographs.

In the 1970s, a box of Dawes' negatives was discovered in Upper Queen Street in Auckland, and a collection of approximately 475 negatives in a second hand store in Kaitaia in 2012, both of which were acquired by Auckland Libraries. In October 2018, 1,670 negatives from Dawes' photographic collections were donated to the Sir George Grey Special Collections of Auckland Libraries by Dawes' descendants. The images collections span the final years of the 19th and the first decades of the 20th century. The entire 2,000 image collection held at Auckland Libraries was inscribed on the UNESCO Memory of the World Aotearoa New Zealand Ngā Mahara o te Ao register in 2019.

Dawes' work was first exhibited at the Auckland Central Library in 2019. This was followed by an exhibition at the Te Ahu Centre in Kaitaia in 2021, which focused on photographs of Hokianga life during the 1890s, and by a 2024 exhibition at Te Kōngahu Museum of Waitangi, focusing on images of the Dog Tax War.

Dawes' photographs are also held in the Auckland War Memorial Museum collections, consisting of 104 plates that had been purchased by Ben Te Wake from the owner of Dawes' property circa 1974.

== Personal life ==
In 1901, Dawes married Jessie Allen (née Bryers), widow of William McIlreen Allen. Prior to the marriage, Allen had five children before she had been widowed. Allen had a further five children with Dawes between 1902 and 1908.

== Gallery ==
Photographs by Charles Peet Dawes

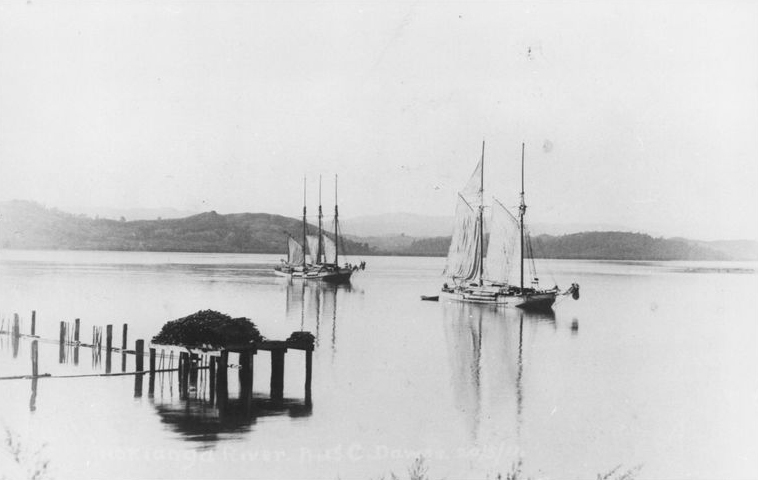
Hokianga Harbour in May 1911

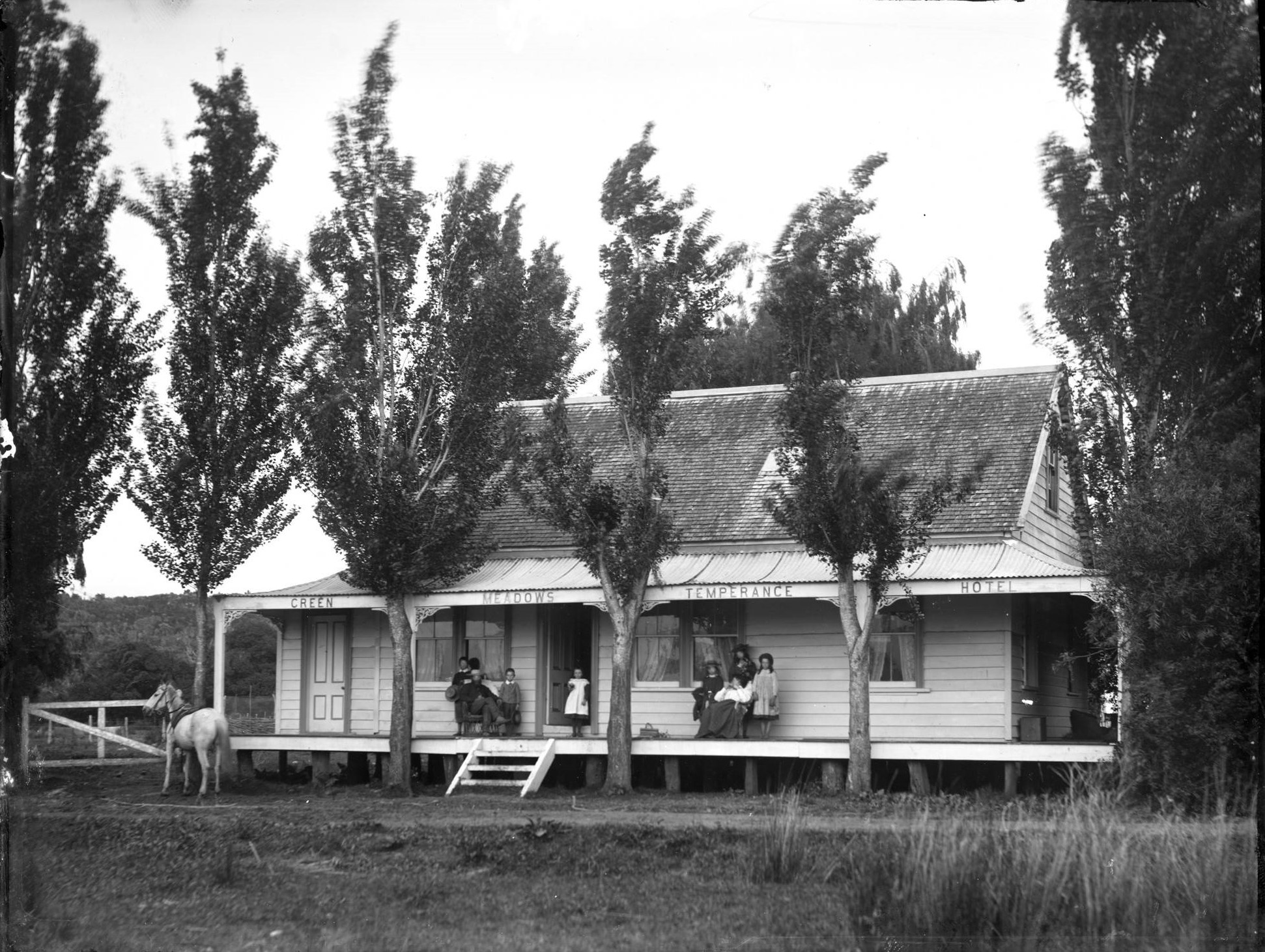
Green Meadows Temperance Hotel in Kaitaia

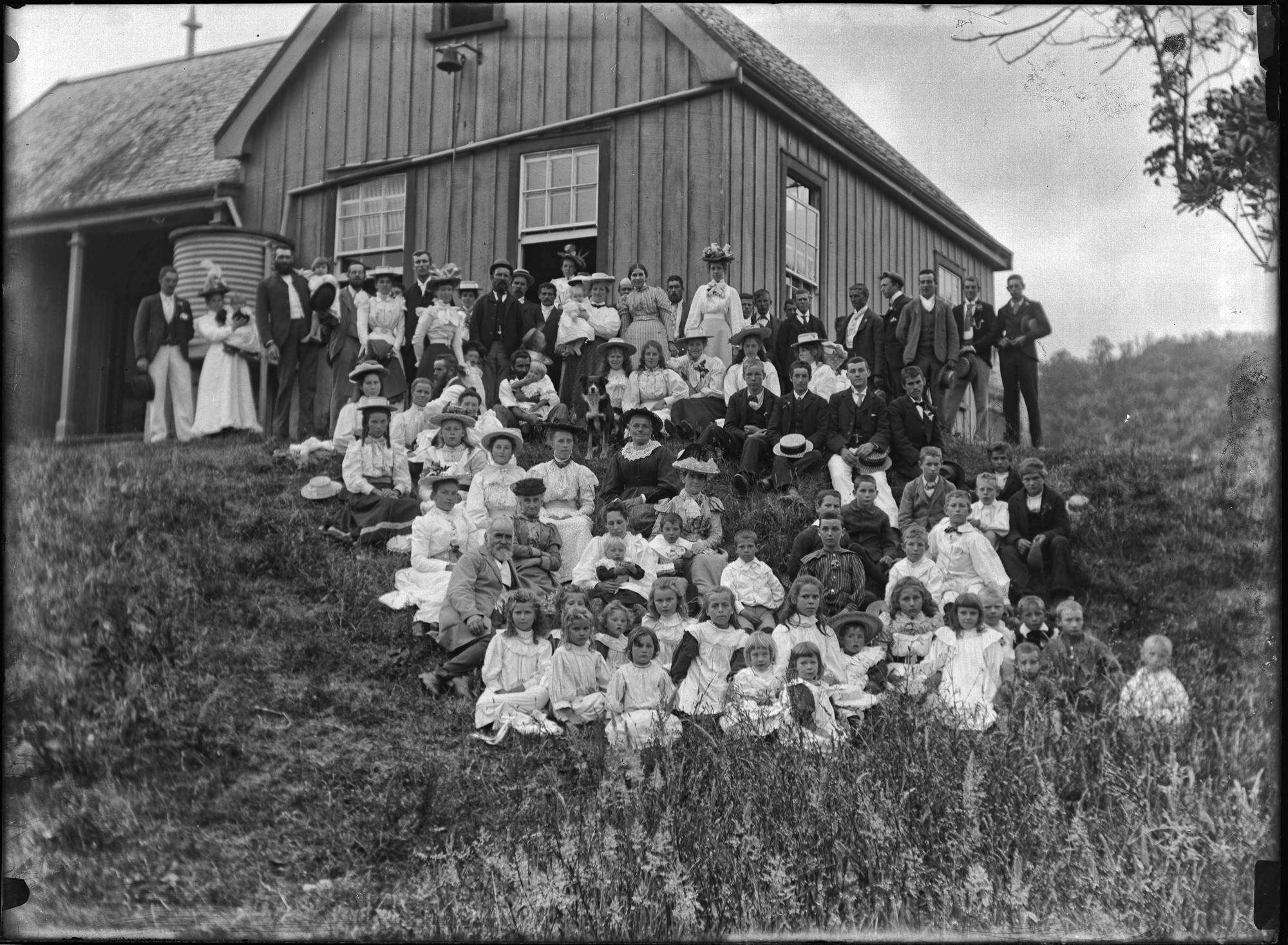
Waimamaku School Picnic (1900)

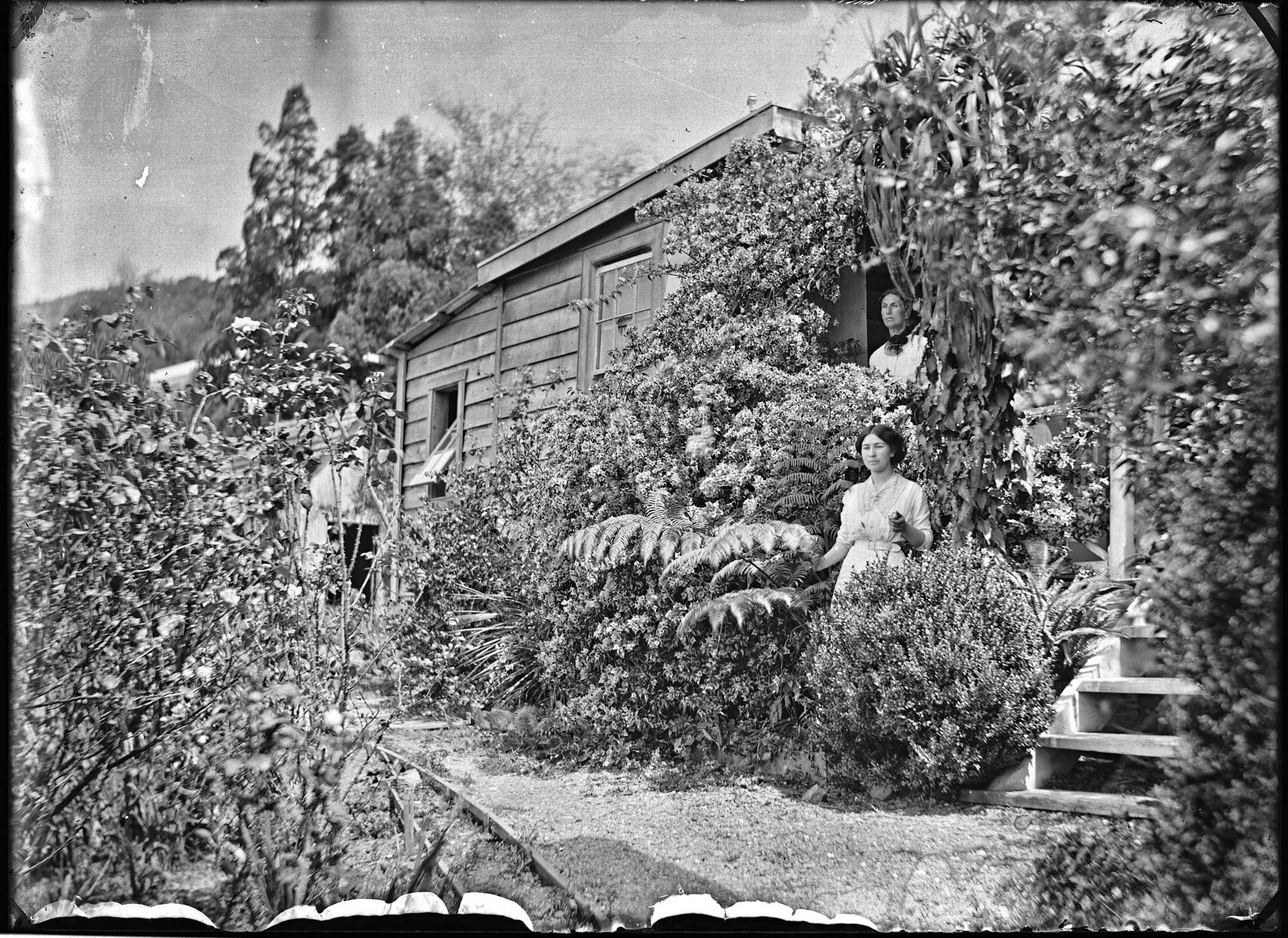
Two women in a garden outside a house in Kohukohu (c. 1900s)
