= Ursula Bethell =

New Zealand poet 1874–1945

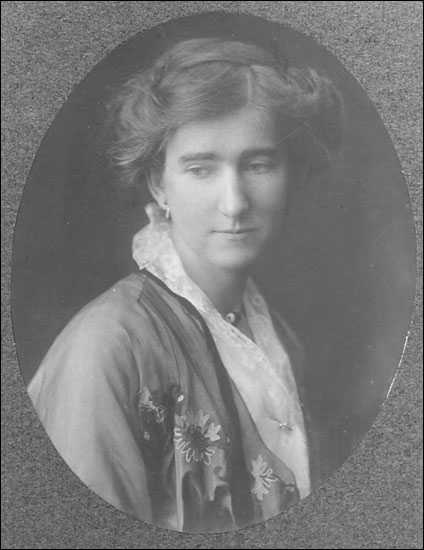
- Ursula Bethell, c. 1900
- Born: Mary Ursula Bethell; 6 October 1874; Horsell, Surrey, England
- Died: 15 January 1945 (aged 70); Christchurch, New Zealand
- Occupations: Poet; social worker
- Writing career
- Pen name: Evelyn Hayes
- Notable work: From a Garden in the Antipodes (1929)

Mary Ursula Bethell (6 October 1874 – 15 January 1945) was a New Zealand poet. Born in England and raised in New Zealand, she spent much of her adult life travelling between the two countries. Although she considered herself "by birth and choice English", she played an important role in the development of modern New Zealand poetry.

In 1924, Bethell settled at Rise Cottage in the Cashmere Hills near Christchurch, where she lived with her companion Effie Pollen. At about 50, she began writing poetry, drawing inspiration from the Canterbury landscape. Her first collection, From a Garden in the Antipodes (1929), published under her pen name Evelyn Hayes, is her best-known work, and her collected poems were published posthumously in 1950. In recognition of her legacy, the University of Canterbury established the Ursula Bethell Residency in Creative Writing in 1979.

== Background and social work ==
Bethell was born in Horsell, Surrey, England, on 6 October 1874. She was the eldest daughter of wealthy barrister and farm owner Richard Bethell and his wife Isabel Anne, née Lillie. Her parents had both lived in New Zealand in the 1860s, but returned to London where they married. Shortly after her birth, her parents returned with her to New Zealand, where her younger brother and sister were born. She was educated at Rangiora Primary School and Christchurch Girls' High School, and developed a love of the Canterbury landscape that would last for the rest of her life. In later years, she wrote of the Ashley River:

It was the river, the river. We played there,
out, out of the house, out of the garden, out under the wide sky.

— "By The River Ashley"

Her father died in April 1885. Two years later, she travelled back to England and boarded with the family of Ruth Mayhew, who became a lifelong friend, as she attended Oxford High School for Girls and a Swiss finishing school. She spent time in New Zealand between 1892 and 1895, primarily undertaking charitable work, and from 1895 studied painting in Geneva and music in Dresden. Having enough private wealth to support herself, she took up social work in London with an Anglican organisation known as the "Grey Ladies". She continued to perform social work in England and New Zealand, frequently travelling between the two, including during the war years.

In 1924 Bethell permanently settled in New Zealand, in the Cashmere Hills near Christchurch. She bought a newly built home, Rise Cottage in Westenra Terrace, which she shared with another returnee New Zealander, Effie Pollen. Pollen and Bethell had met in England around 1904. Poet and scholar Janet Charman has suggested their relationship could have been a romantic one, which may have been hidden due to Bethell's Anglicanism and social expectations of the time. Bethell herself described the relationship as "prevailingly maternal", and poet and scholar Peter Simpson considers that the relationship was most likely platonic.

== Poetry and literary circle ==
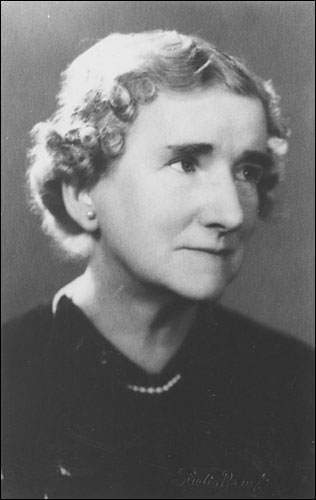
Bethell in 1942

Bethell began to write poetry seriously at the age of about 50. Most of it was written during her years at Rise Cottage with Pollen. At first she did not intend to publish her poems, but wrote them as messages to send in letters to her friends. She was deeply affected by Pollen's death in 1934, writing to a friend that the event was "a complete shattering of my life.... [for] from her I have had love, tenderness, and understanding... and close and happy companionship". She wrote few poems after Pollen's death, with the exception of six memorial poems addressed to Pollen; most of her poetry therefore dates from the decade 1924 to 1934. Writer and academic Vincent O'Sullivan said, "She was surprised that people admired her 'garden' poems, often written as casual messages to friends.... By the late 1920s, she was also writing the more deliberate and intellectually adventurous poems which took their place in her later two books." Following Pollen's death, Bethell sold Rise Cottage and took up residence in an apartment in a house she had donated to the Anglican church.

Her first collection, From a Garden in the Antipodes (1929), is her best-known work; its poems have often been anthologised. It reflects Bethell's attachment to the Canterbury landscape and her religious faith, as well as her complex relationship with England, which she thought of as her home. Her later collections include poems for which there had been no place in the first collection, and memorial poems to Pollen. The Oxford Companion to Twentieth-Century Literature in English describes her poetry as characterised by "a plainness and spareness (as well as freshness of image)", contrasting it with earlier "more ornamented" New Zealand poetry.

Bethell is credited by several scholars, including Simpson, O'Sullivan and Peter Whiteford, as being one of the founders of Christchurch's flourishing literary scene in the early to mid-20th century. The writer Charles Brasch, visiting Bethell in the late 1930s, found her at "the centre of an astonishingly diverse circle of interesting people, many of the younger of whom were so close to her that she almost directed their lives." Her circle included the crime writer Ngaio Marsh, the essayist M. H. Holcroft, the artists R. N. Field and Evelyn Page, the poets Blanche Baughan, D'Arcy Cresswell and John Schroder, and the musician Frederick Page. She acted as a mentor to younger local poets, notably Allen Curnow and Denis Glover.

Bethell published From a Garden in the Antipodes under the pen name Evelyn Hayes, as she felt that publicity in "provincial New Zealand" would be a "painful affair". Charman speculates that this decision may have also been due to her wish to hide the nature of her relationship with Effie Pollen. Bethell said that the name Evelyn Hayes came from a great-great-grandfather, Sir Henry Hayes of Cork, who was "deported for life to Botany Bay for attempted abduction of a Quaker heiress." In later life, she became less keen to conceal her identity, and before her death, asked that her collected poems be published under her own name.

== Death and legacy ==
Bethell died in Christchurch on 15 January 1945. A volume of her Collected Poems appeared posthumously in 1950 and was reprinted in 1985 featuring an introduction by O'Sullivan. In 1948, after her death, several New Zealand authors contributed personal reflections to Landfall. The educator and writer Crawford Somerset said, "New Zealand has produced no other poetry so clearly original and so delicately sensitive as Ursula Bethell's". The poet and journalist D'Arcy Cresswell said that, in literature, "New Zealand wasn't truly discovered, in fact, until Ursula Bethell, 'very earnestly digging', raised her head to look at the mountains. Almost everyone had been blind before."

Her poems were included in both of Allen Curnow's influential anthologies, A Book of New Zealand Verse 1923–1945 (1945) (in which 19 of her poems were printed, more than any other poet), and The Penguin Book of New Zealand Verse (1960). They were also included in An Anthology of Twentieth Century New Zealand Poetry (1970), edited by Vincent O'Sullivan, and The Penguin Book of New Zealand Verse (1985), edited by Ian Wedde and Harvey McQueen.

In 1979, the University of Canterbury founded the Ursula Bethell Residency in Creative Writing to support and encourage New Zealand writing. It is awarded to writers of "proven merit". Notable recipients have included Margaret Mahy, Keri Hulme and Eleanor Catton.

Bethell's papers and artworks are held by the Macmillan Brown Library at the University of Canterbury. In 2021, this collection was inscribed on the New Zealand Memory of the World Register register maintained by UNESCO.

== Published works ==
- (As Evelyn Hayes) From a Garden in the Antipodes (London: Sidgwick and Jackson, 1929)
- (As "The Author of Poems From a Garden in the Antipodes") Time and Place (Christchurch: Caxton, 1936)
- (As "The Author of Time and Place") Day and Night: Poems 1924–1934, (Christchurch: Caxton, 1939)
- Collected Poems, ed. Helen Simpson, (Christchurch: Caxton Press, 1950), (Kindle edition 2016, ASIN: B016QNELZ4)
- Collected Poems, ed. Vincent O’Sullivan, (Wellington: Victoria University Press, 1985 [1950])
- Vibrant with Words: The Letters of Ursula Bethell, ed. Peter Whiteford (Wellington: Victoria University Press, 2005). ISBN 9780864735041
