= Auckland Central City Library =

Library in Auckland, New Zealand

- Tāmaki Pātaka Kōrero
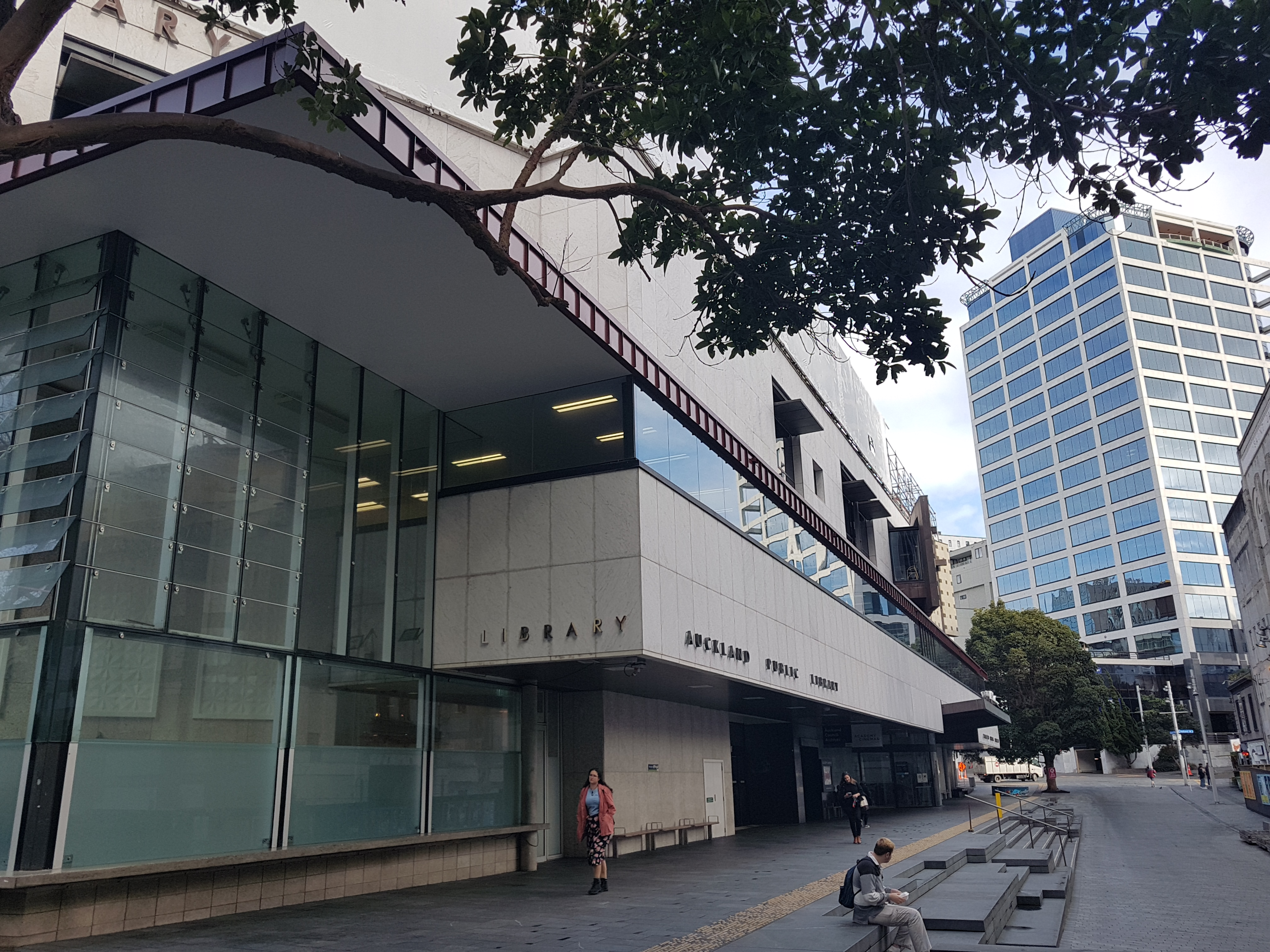
- The Central City Library on Lorne Street
- 36°51′06″S 174°45′55″E
- Location: 44-46 Lorne Street, Auckland Central, Auckland, New Zealand
- Type: Public library
- Established: 25 November 1971; 54 years ago
- Branch of: Auckland Libraries

Collection
- Size: Floating

The Auckland Central City Library (Māori: Tāmaki Pātaka Kōrero) is a public library located in the Auckland City Centre, New Zealand. The facility is the main branch of Auckland Libraries. The successor to the former central city library that was housed in the modern-day Auckland Art Gallery building, it was opened in 1971.

== Location and building ==
The library is located on Lorne Street in central Auckland, opposite the St. James Theatre, currently a dilapidated building. The location is a city block surrounded by Lorne Street, Rutland Street and Wellesley Street.

The library building is a modernist building, designed by architect Ewen Wainscott, then the deputy Auckland City engineer. The basement floors of the building house the Auckland Council Archives, and the Academy Cinemas. At the front of the library is Kawe Reo / Voices Carry (2011), a sculpture and poem by Robert Sullivan. The artwork includes a poem carved into the steps of the library that discusses the location of the former Waihorotiu Stream, and a bench shaped as the letters "REO" (language), which features a Māori language version of the poem.

== History ==
=== Establishment of a central city library ===
The first iteration of the central Auckland public library opened on 7 September 1880 on Chancery Street, when the Auckland Free Public Library opened, originally housing 6,000 books. The library was established after the Auckland Mechanics' Institute, which had assembled a library in their premises, voted for the Auckland City Council to take over operations due to declining membership in April 1879. The council took over the Mechanics Institute building in December 1879, opening the library at the same site in 1880. The new site combined the Mechanics' Institute library with the books of the Auckland Provincial Council Library, which had previously only been accessible to elected members and people nominated by members.

In 1882, former Governor George Grey organised for his literature and personal document collection to be donated to the newly established library. After the mayor and Auckland City Council accepted the offer, the council realised the current library was an unsuitable space to house the new collection, and decided to construct a new library and gallery space on Wellesley and Coburg (now Kitchener) streets, now the site of the Auckland Art Gallery.

The new building opened on 26 March 1887. The space was shared with the Auckland Art Gallery from February 1888, and from 1890, the Elam School of Fine Arts and offices for the Auckland City Council. By 1891, the library held 23,307 books, of which almost half were from the Grey collection. The council moved to the Auckland Town Hall building in 1912, and in 1913, the first branch libraries were established in Auckland, in Grafton and Parnell. In 1916, the library began sharing space with the Old Colonists' Museum.

=== Construction ===
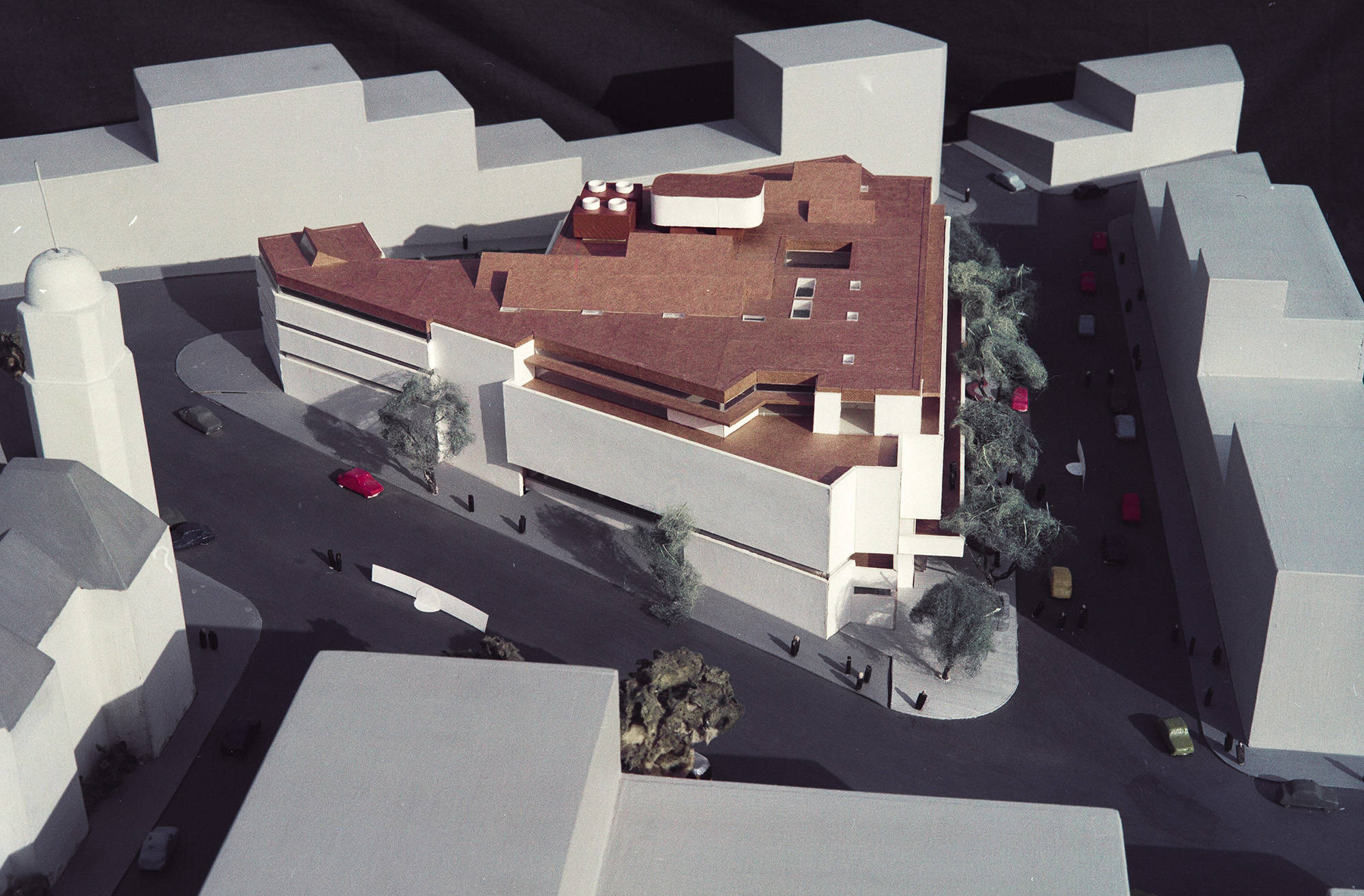
Model of the proposed Auckland Public Library

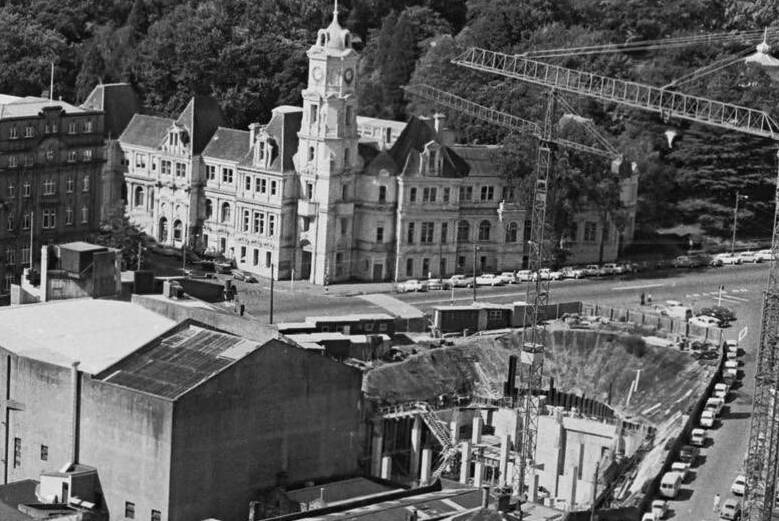
Construction site of the library building, with the former library building in the background (c. 1968)

By 1953, the library held approximately 80,000 books, and the Old Colonists' Museum was closed in 1956 to make space for more library books. The need for a larger and more modern library building was first discussed in the early 1950s. In September 1953, the Auckland City Council announced their intentions to establish a new library, and in December of the same year chose the site: a city block bordered by Wellesley, Rutland and Lorne streets. By October 1957, the council decided to not go forward with a new library building, instead intending to extend the existing library, however the Local Government Loans Board rejected the council's application. In November, an alternate site was investigated by town clerk F. J. Gwillian (an area south of the Town Hall which would later become Mayoral Drive), and in July 1958, the Auckland City Engineer explored the possibility of constructing a new library in instalments.

On 30 January 1963, Auckland Savings Bank offered the Auckland City Council a low-interest loan for the construction of a new library, in commemoration of the February 1963 visit of Elizabeth II to New Zealand. Within a few weeks of the decision, city librarian Robert Duthie and deputy city architect Ewen M. Wainscott were sent to the United States, United Kingdom and Scandinavia to study recent developments in library technologies.

Construction of the new Lorne Street building began on 4 December 1967, based on designs by Ewen Wainscott and built by construction firm James Wallace Ltd. While initial projections saw completion of the building being in 1966 or 1967, construction was hampered by poor weather, including storms in 1968 (the same storm which caused the Wahine disaster), which caused mudslides from the adjacent Leighton's driving school and petrol station to enter the construction site. Construction was undertaken in two stages, with the first being the southern section of the site, and the second later stage involving the demolition of the Embassy Theatre and adjacent petrol station, which both had leases for the site that ran until 1974. The 1968 storm led to the premature demolition of the petrol station. The first stage of the building was completed in September 1971, after which staff rushed to stock the new library building.

The library was officially opened on 25 November 1971 by Governor-General Sir Arthur Porritt. At opening, the new building housed 350,000 booked and 70 staff under a single roof. The new building featured six floors (including two underground), the first twin escalators to be installed in a library across Australasia, and an entrance which showcased a marble curtain design involving suspended panels on a steel grill, which were in place until building alterations in the late 1990s. Public reception to the new building was mixed, some seeing the modernist building as striking and dignified, likening it to the Maginot Line concrete fortifications, while others felt the building was solid and squat, with many noting the lack of windows in its design.

On 18 October 1979, the Auckland City Council voted to proceed on the second stage of construction for the library, which involved the destruction of the Embassy Theatre. After briefly closing in October 1982, the newly expanded second stage of the library was opened on 22 November 1982. This extension expanded floor space from 100,000 ft^{2} (9,300 m^{2}) to 160,000 ft^{2} (15,000 m^{2}).

=== Further developments ===
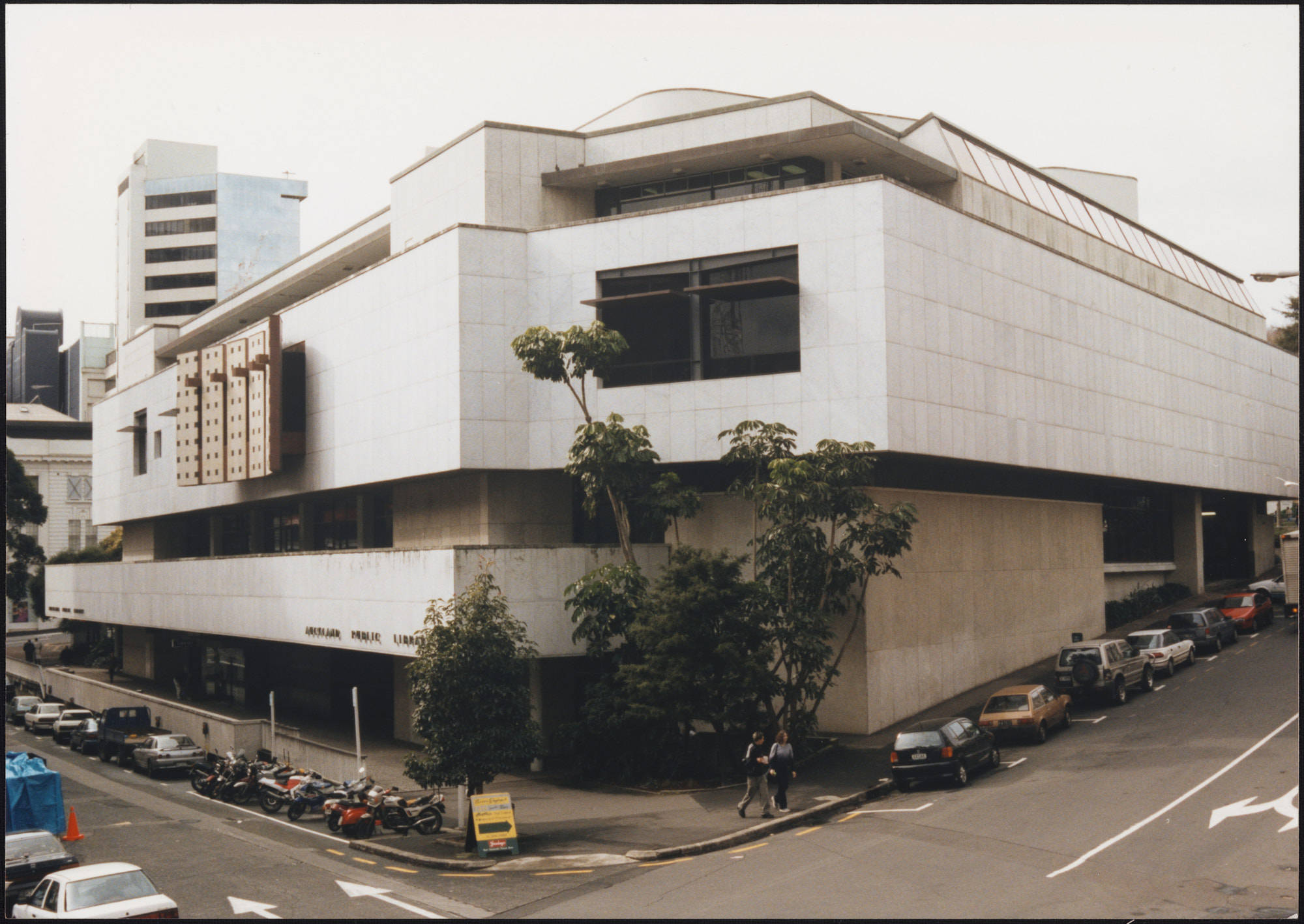
The Central City Library in 1998

In Aug 1988 a switchboard fire closed the library temporarily. The library was refurbished in 1994, including alterations on the second floor and the construction of the Whare Wānanga.

In 1997, the Auckland Research Centre (now known as Research Central) was established in the Auckland Central City Library. Located on the heritage floor of the library, the research library holds extensive local history publications, family history collections and Māori heritage collections.

A water main burst on 23 November 2002, which flooded large parts of the upper and lower basement of the building, affecting over 20,000 items. In 2007 a cafe was added to the complex, the interior refurbished in 2017, and major roofing repairs were undertaken between 2007 and 2019.

== Academy Cinemas ==
The Academy Cinemas are located in the basement of the Auckland Central City Library. The independent cinema shows a mix of foreign, art house and classic films, and is known for inexpensive film showings on Wednesdays, and hosting film festivals.

During the 1970s, the Embassy Theatre operated on the corner of Lorne Street and Wellesley Street, remaining in place during the construction of the new library building. The cinema was demolished as a part of the second stage of library construction in December 1979. In December 1982, construction began on the Academy Cinemas, which opened in February 1983. In 2020 during the COVID-19 pandemic in New Zealand, Academic Cinemas launched an online streaming website called Academy On Demand.

== Gallery ==
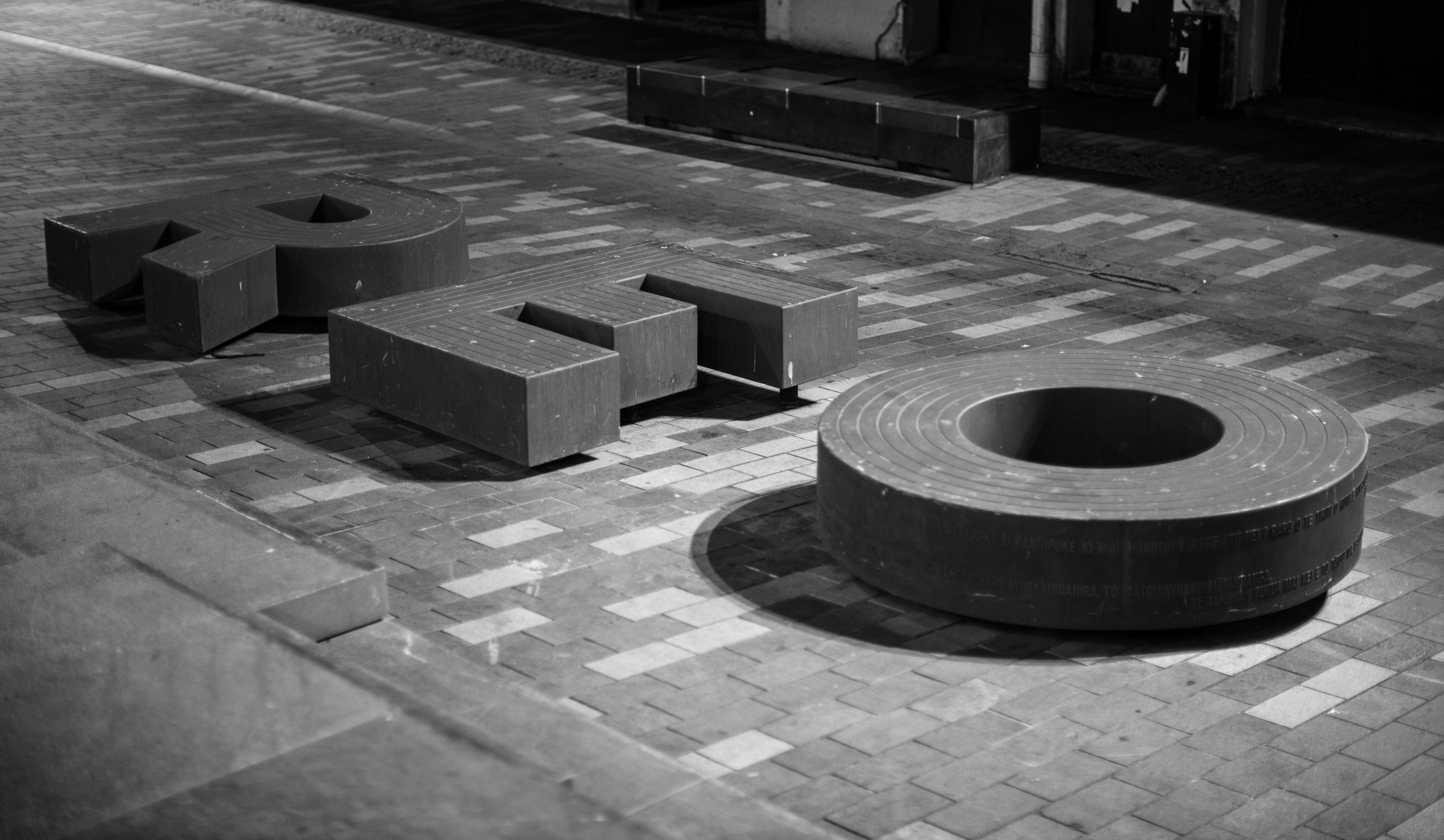
Kawe Reo / Voices Carry bench outside the Central City Library

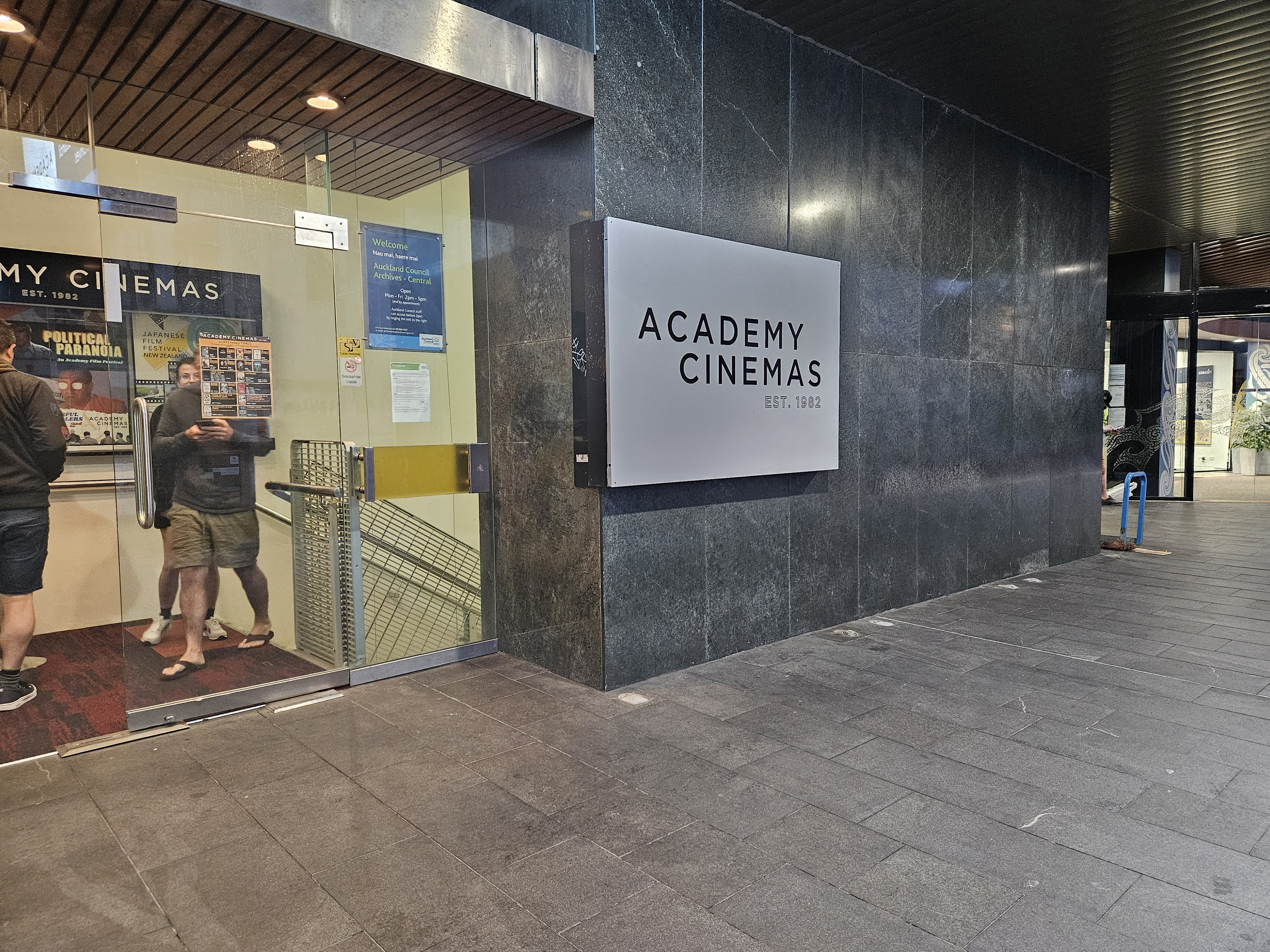
Academy Cinemas

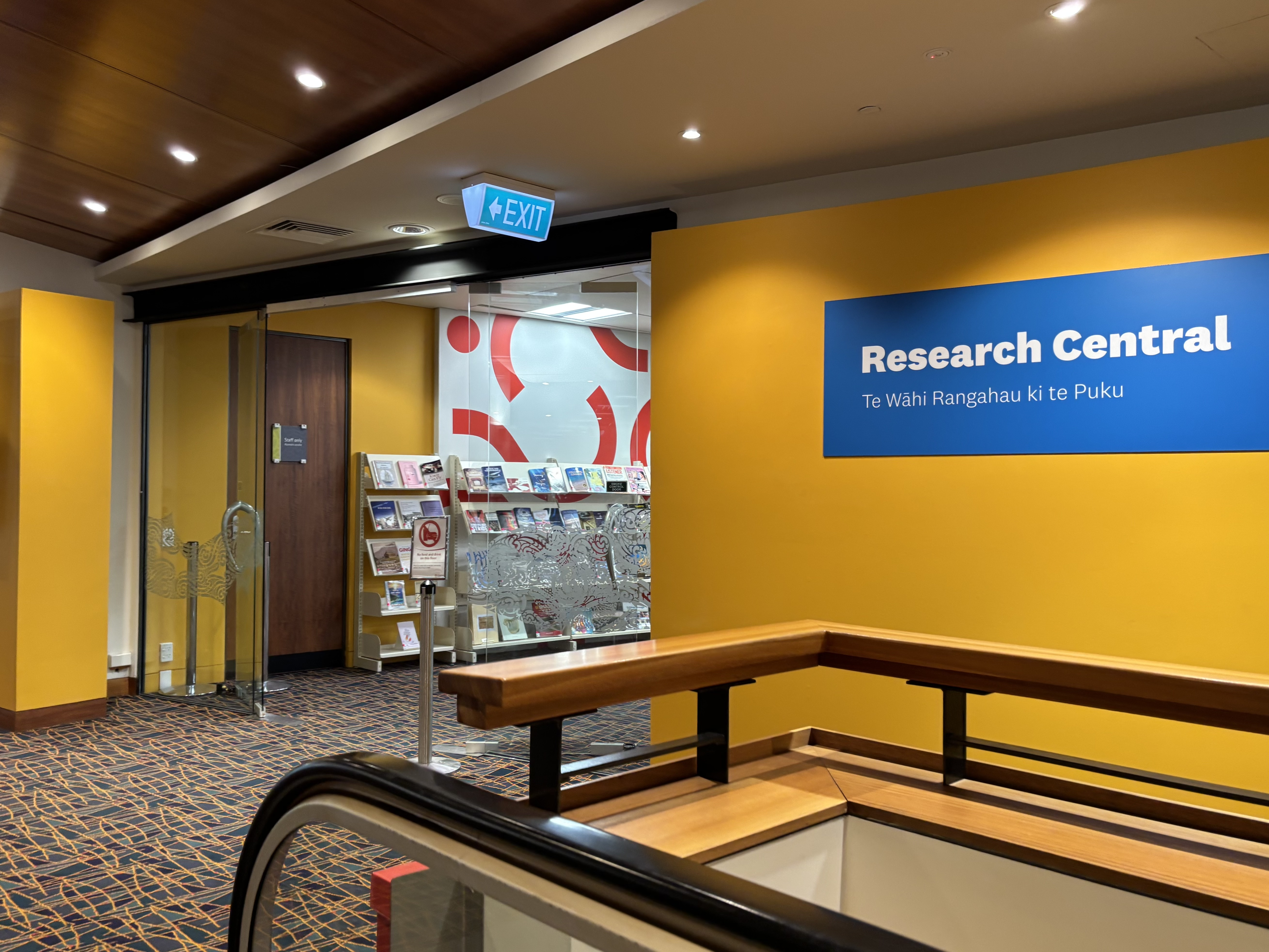
Research Central, the research library within the Central City Library

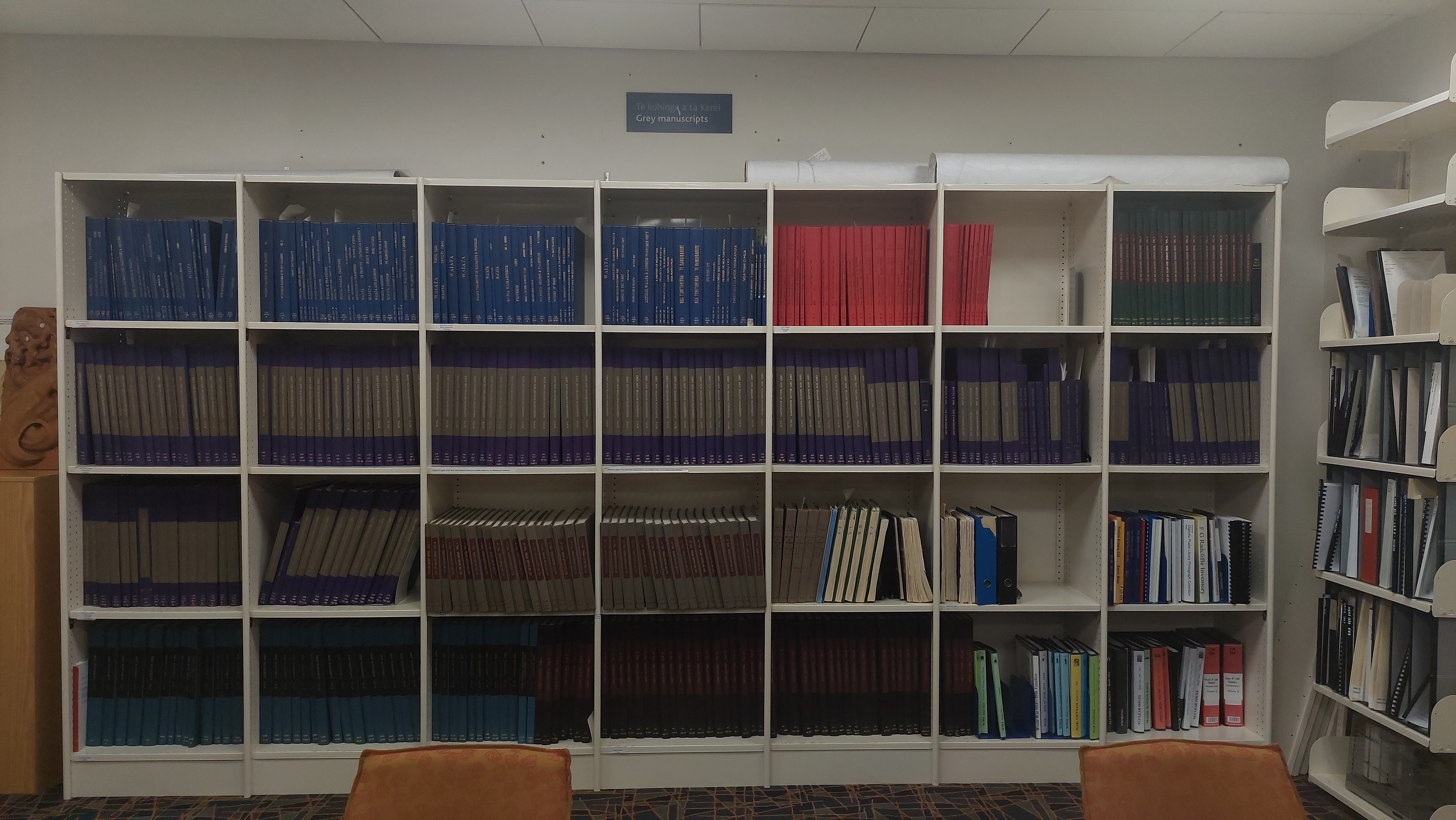
George Grey manuscripts at the Heritage Collections Reading Room

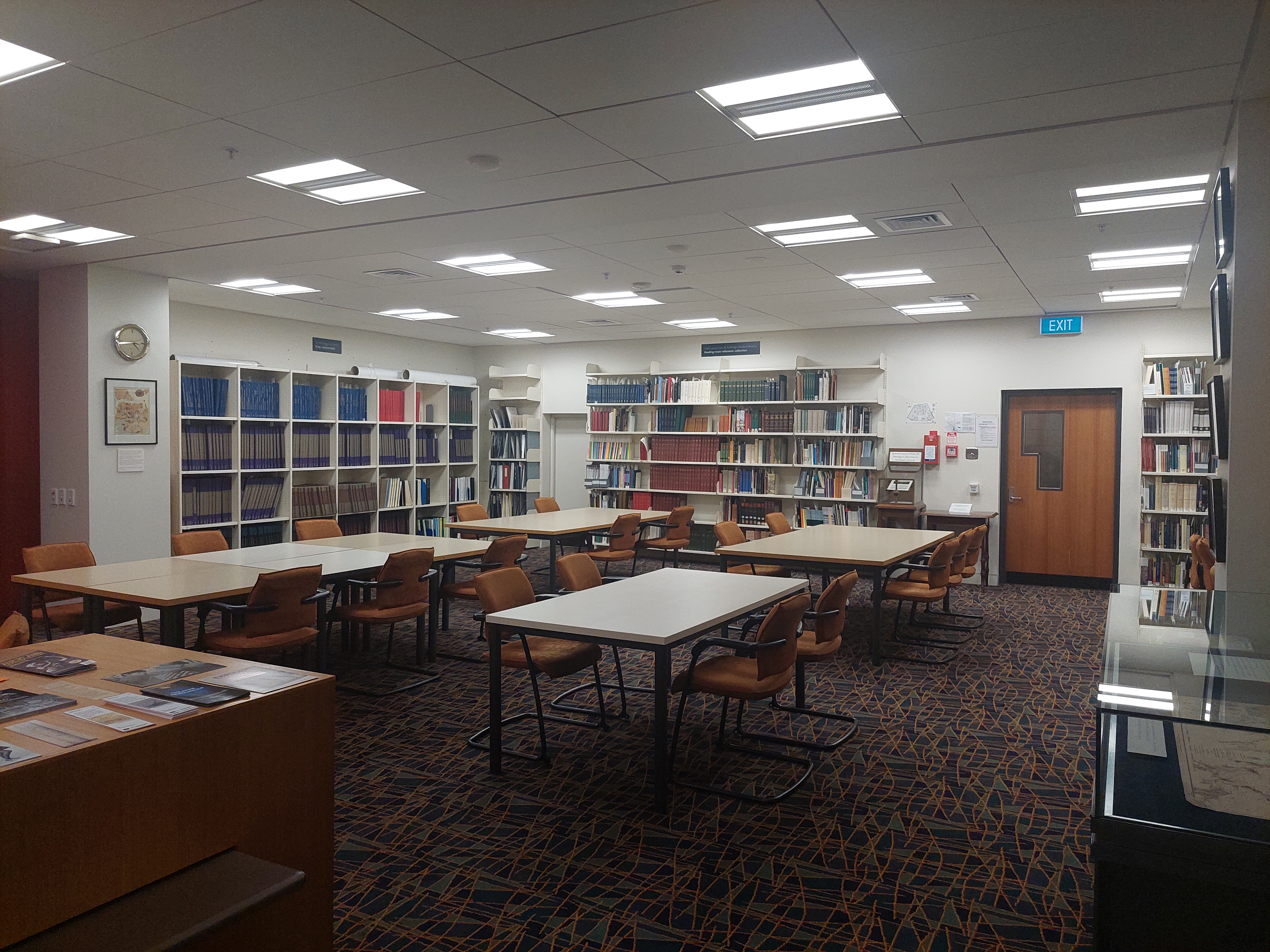
Heritage Collections Reading Room

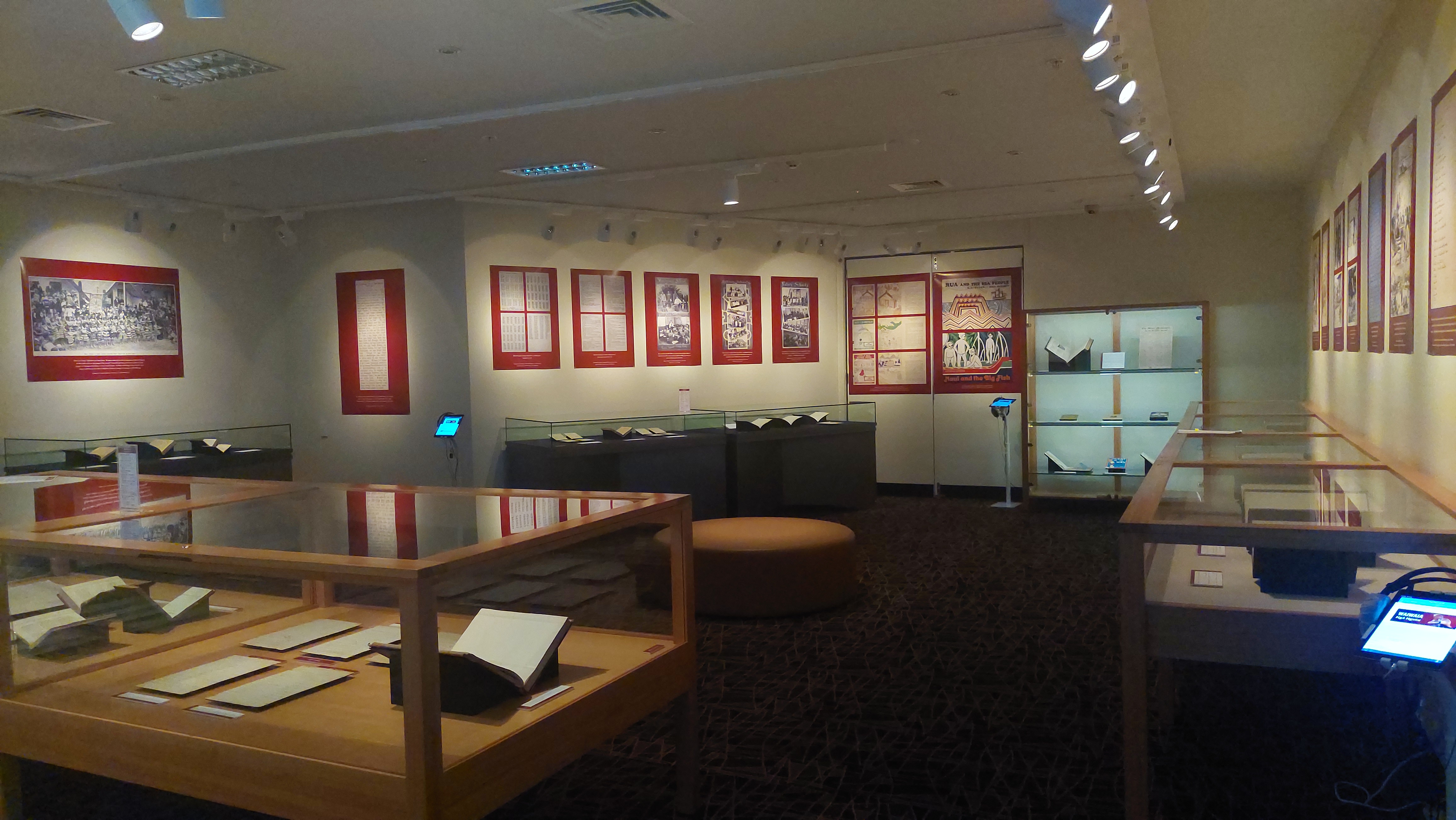
Gallery space at the Central City Library

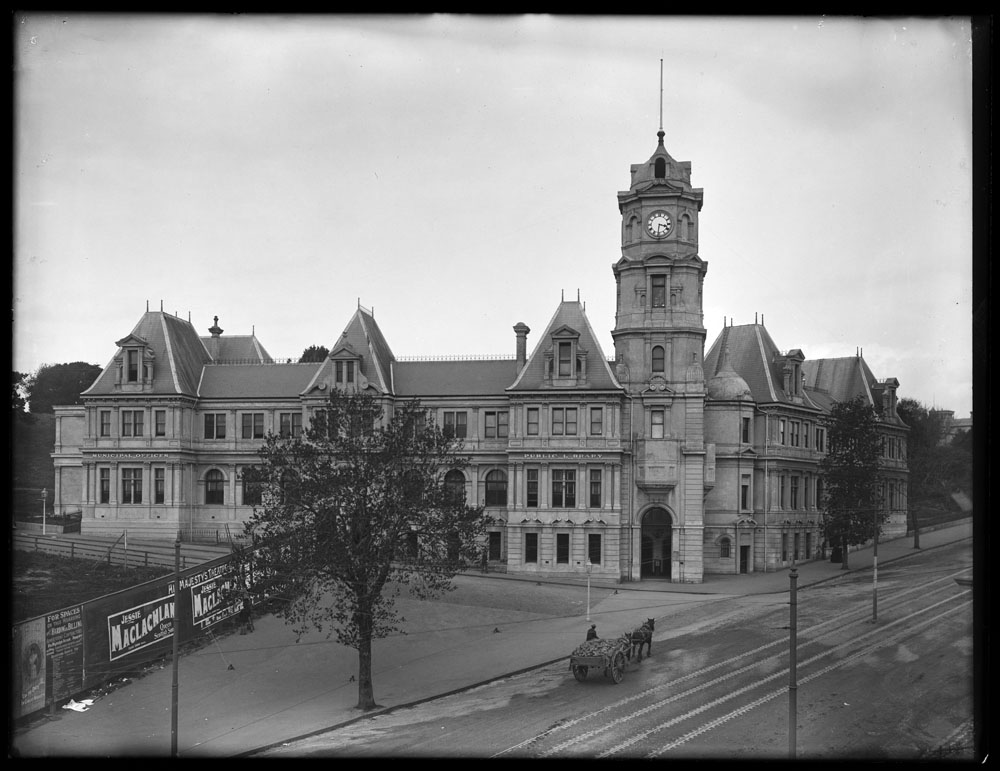
The previous location of the Auckland Public Library, seen in 1905

== Bibliography ==
- Colgan, Wynne (September 1980). The Governor's Gift: the Auckland Public Library 1880-1980. Auckland: Richards Publishing, Auckland City Council. ISBN 0-908596-08-1.
- Verran, David (April 2011). Auckland City Libraries: Another Chapter. Auckland: Auckland Libraries. ISBN 978-0-473-18578-7.
