= Tag und Nacht =

Tag und Nacht may refer to:

- Tag und Nacht (film), a 2011 Austrian film
- Tag und Nacht (album), a 2006 album by Schiller
