= 1893 Women's Suffrage Petition =

Petition to the New Zealand Government in support of women's suffrage

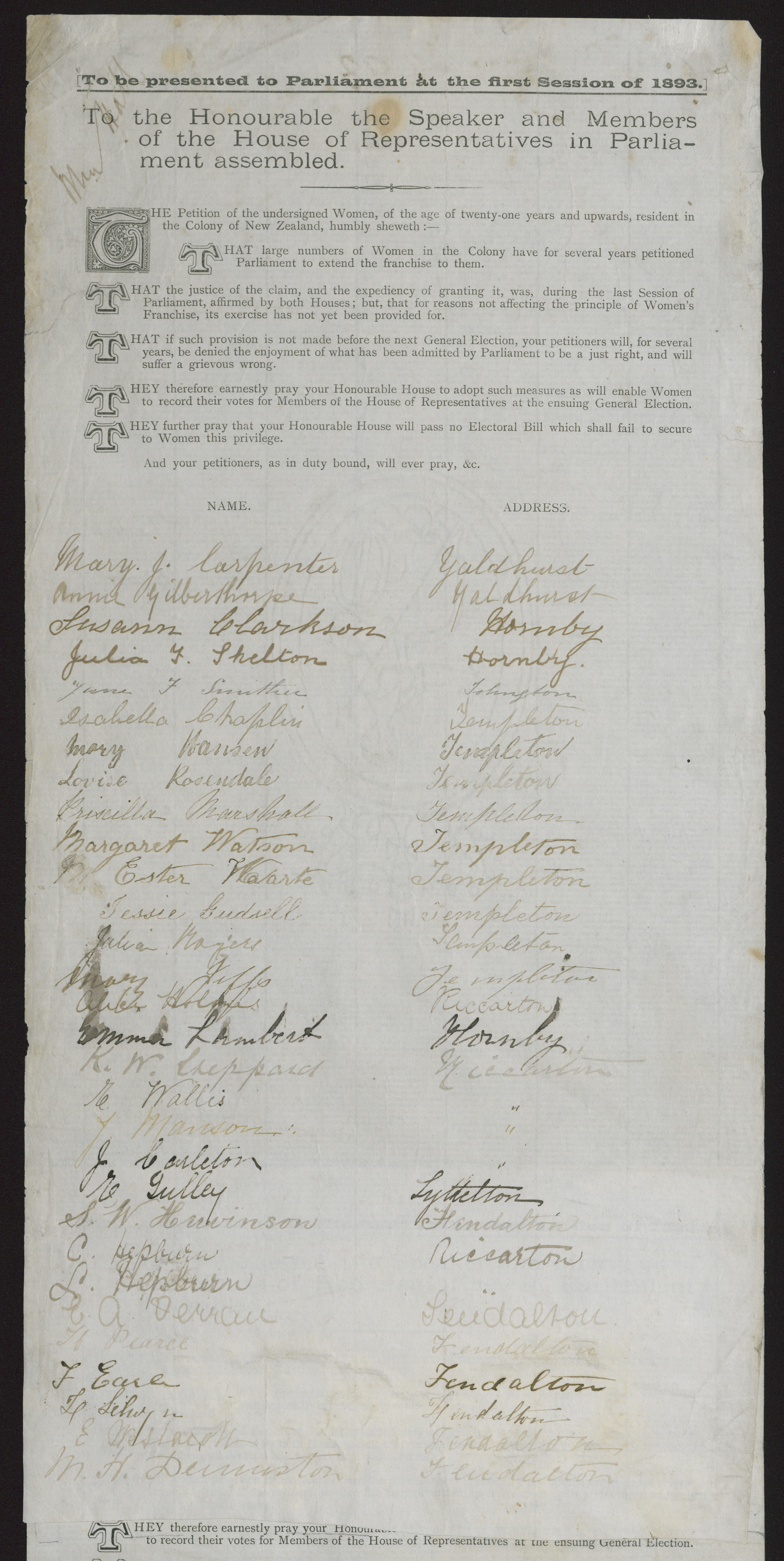
The first sheet of the 1893 Women's Suffrage Petition. Archives Reference LE1 1893/7a

The 1893 women's suffrage petition was the third of three petitions to the New Zealand Government supporting women's suffrage. It resulted in the Electoral Act 1893, which gave women the right to vote in the 1893 general election. The 1893 petition was substantially more extensive than the 1891 petition, which had around 9,000 signatures, and larger still than the 1892 petition, which contained some 20,000 signatures. The third petition was the largest petition presented to Parliament at that point, with nearly 32,000 signatures. The petition was signed in various parts of the country by women, aged 21 or older, who signed their names and addresses. At least 20 men also signed the petition.

The main petition had more than 500 individual sheets joined to form a roll stretching over 270 metres (890 ft). When Sir John Hall submitted the petition to Parliament on 28 July 1893, Parliamentary staff unwound a section of the roll, extending it to the whole length of the debating chamber. There were 12 other smaller petitions which have not survived.

Politicians John Hall, Alfred Saunders, and Premier John Ballance supported women's suffrage, but the effort was led mainly by the New Zealand branch of the Woman's Christian Temperance Union, which Kate Sheppard led from 1887.

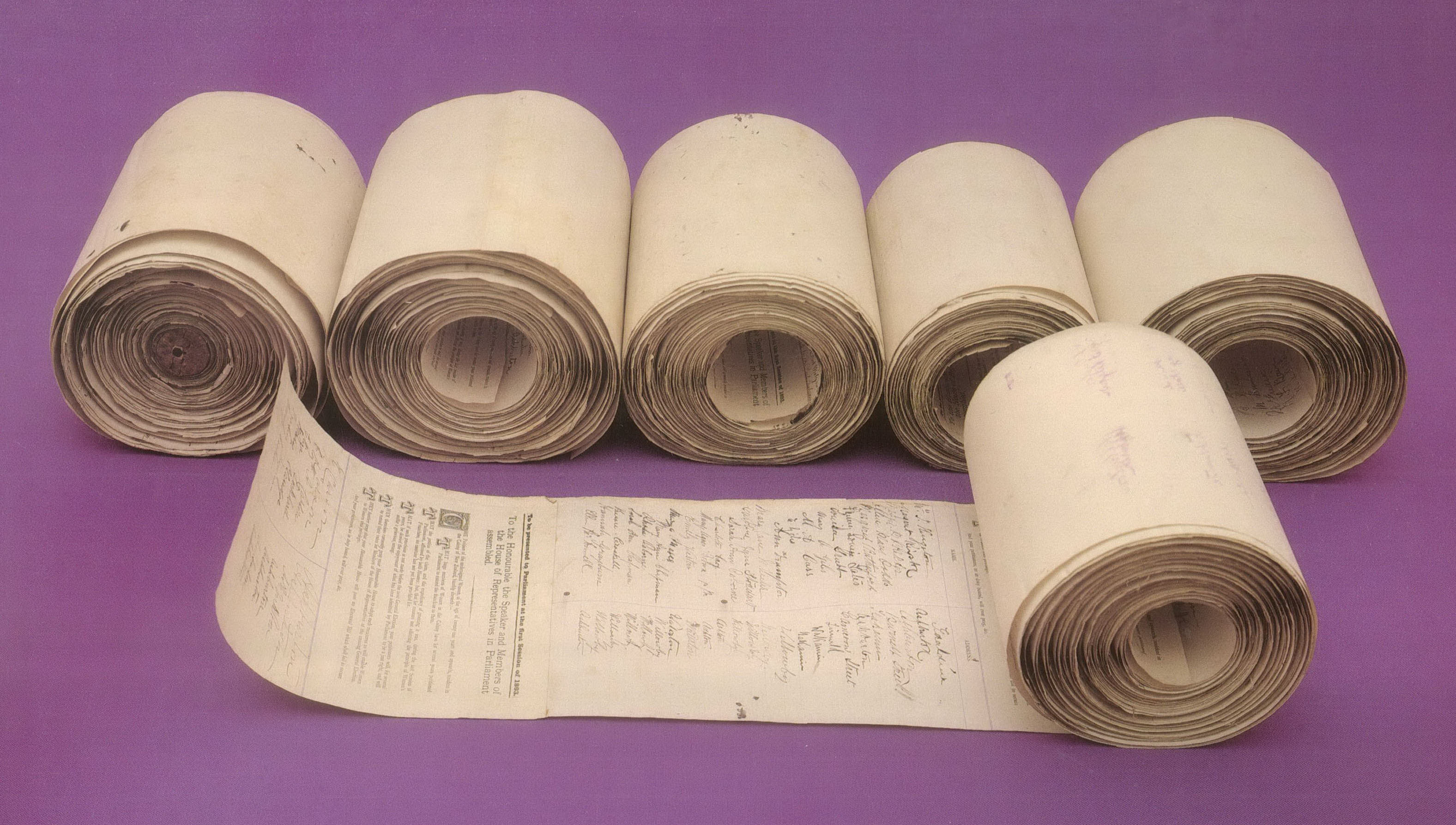
1893 Women's Suffrage Petition

The petition is on display at the National Library of New Zealand in Wellington as part of the He Tohu exhibition. It remains, however, under the care of the Chief Archivist and Archives New Zealand. It has been on the UNESCO Memory of the World international register since 1997. It is also inscribed in the national register, Memory of the World Aotearoa New Zealand Ngā Mahara o te Ao.

The 1891 petition has not survived, but Archives New Zealand holds the 1892 petition.

== Text ==
The text of the petition, as presented to the House of Representatives in 1893, is as follows.

THE Petition of the undersigned Women, of the age of twenty-one years and upwards, resident in the Colony of New Zealand, humbly sheweth:--

THAT large numbers of Women in the Colony have for several years petitioned Parliament to extend the franchise to them.

THAT the justice of the claim, and the expediency of granting it, was, during the last Session of Parliament, affirmed by both Houses; but, that for reasons not affecting the principle of Women's Franchise, its exercise has not yet been provided for.

THAT if such provision is not made before the next General Election, your petitioners will, for several years, be denied the enjoyment of what has been admitted by Parliament to be a just right, and will suffer a grievous wrong.

THEY therefore earnestly pray your Honourable House to adopt such measures as will enable Women to record their votes for Members of the House of Representatives at the ensuing General Election.

THEY further pray that your Honourable House will pass no Electoral Bill which shall fail to secure to Women this privilege.

And your petitioners, as in duty bound, will ever pray, &c.
