= Day and Night (M. C. Escher) =

Woodcut by M. C. Escher

- Artist: M. C. Escher
- Year: 1938
- Type: Woodcut
- Dimensions: 39.2 cm × 67.6 cm (15 7/16 in × 26 5/8 in)

Day and Night is a woodcut made by the Dutch artist M. C. Escher in 1938.

== Artwork ==
The woodcut depicts a landscape mirrored horizontally with respect to the center of the image. It has two cities, each with an associated river and an interlocking pattern of birds gradually appearing towards the top of the image making a tessellation. These birds appear from the tiles of the landscape and become more detailed towards the extremes of the woodcut. Along the center, the image is divided into complementary black (right) and white (left), or, as the title suggests, day and night. The birds of the image contradict the overall partition of black and white throughout the image, as the black birds are in the white part of the image, while the white birds are in the black part, each of them appearing to move away from their color partition.

== Significance ==
Day and Night was one of the most popular of Escher's prints during his lifetime. He printed more than 600 copies of it. A blue variant of the print sold for $94,062.50 in Los Angeles in 2022.

Escher became interested in how forms could fit together to create what Sarah Lawson calls "paradoxical patterns", as when the black geese in Day and Night emerge from the darkened spaces between the white geese that are flying in the opposite direction.
