= St Heliers Library =

Library in Saint Heliers, Auckland, New Zealand

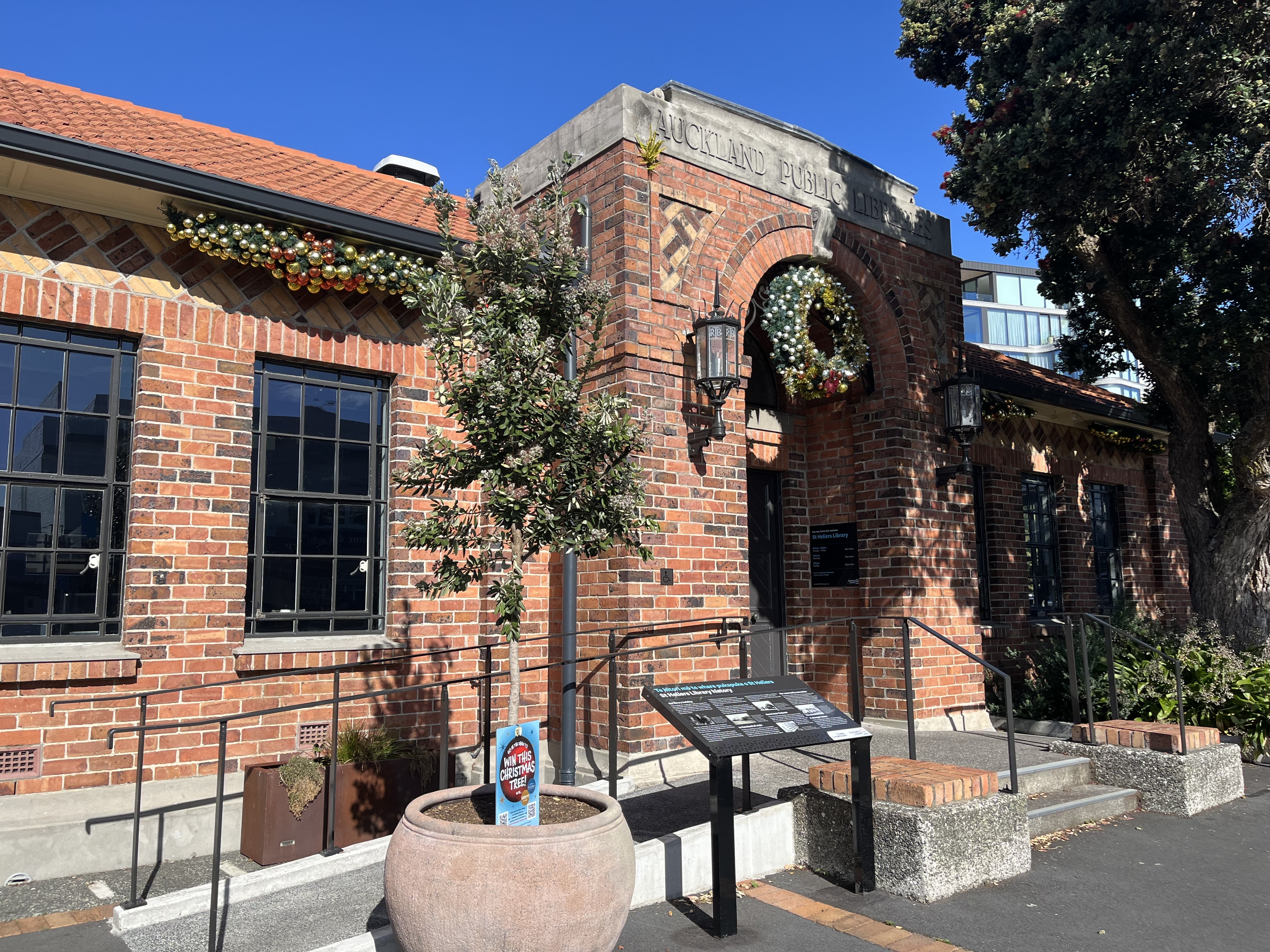
- 36°51′03″S 174°51′29″E
- Location: 32 Saint Heliers Bay Road, St Heliers, Auckland, New Zealand
- Type: Public library
- Established: 1926; 100 years ago
- Service area: Saint Heliers
- Branch of: Auckland Libraries

Other information
- Website: St Heliers Library

St Heliers Library is a local branch of Auckland Libraries, serving the suburb of Saint Heliers. The library was formally opened as the Tamaki Library in 1931, in the former offices of the Tamaki West Road Board. It is an Auckland Council Heritage listed building category B.

== History ==
The first library in the St Heliers area was the Tamaki Library at Tamaki school in the 1870s, with about 300, mostly non-fiction books. A Mr Chambers donated 150 books to Tamaki library, with the library requesting further contributions from the community, receiving a total of 260 books. The Tamaki West Road Board purchased a further 1,000 books, to be stored in the powerhouse in Long Drive until the new library location opened in 1926.

St Heliers Library was first opened in 1926 as the Tamaki West Road Board offices and fire station, built by Lye & Sons, and designed by Grierson, Aimer and Draffin. The offices and fire station were made of fireproof brick, and was designed so that it could be converted into a library if needed. The fire station successfully ran the library by 1927 alongside its regular duties. After the Tamaki West Road Board was merged with the Auckland City Council in 1928, the council began offering mobile library services to St Heliers.

The Tamaki West Road Board offices and fire station was transitioned into a public library opening on 13 June 1931, which at the time was give the name Tamaki Library. Two rooms were made available for the lending of books and the library was opened by Councillor Ellen Melville, Chairman of the Library Committee. The Lending Department was capable of holding 3,000 volumes at that time. The number of volumes and visitors rapidly increased, and by 1937 an additional room of 37 ft^{2} (3.4 m^{2}) was built to expand the Lending Department, and add a children's room reading room, and staff room. Further additions to the library building were made in 1956.

Around the year 1960, the library was renamed, becoming the St Heliers library after the Glen Innes Library was opened. The library underwent an extension in 1974, and refurbishments in 2001.

The library underwent earthquake strengthening and renewal work in 2022 after being twice assessed as earthquake prone. It received funding from the Auckland Council seismic regional programme for this work. In addition to seismic strengthening, the roof and windows were replaced and original panelling and other features were discovered and preserved. The library reopened on the 15th of August 2023. Deputy Mayor Desley Simpson said at the opening that "as a result of Auckland Council investment, our beautiful St Heliers library is future-proofed for many generations to come.”

== Library services and events ==
The St Heliers Library runs many library services and events, including for children and older people. The library has run a children's holiday programme over the summer holidays since at least 1977. The library is open every day.

== Gallery ==
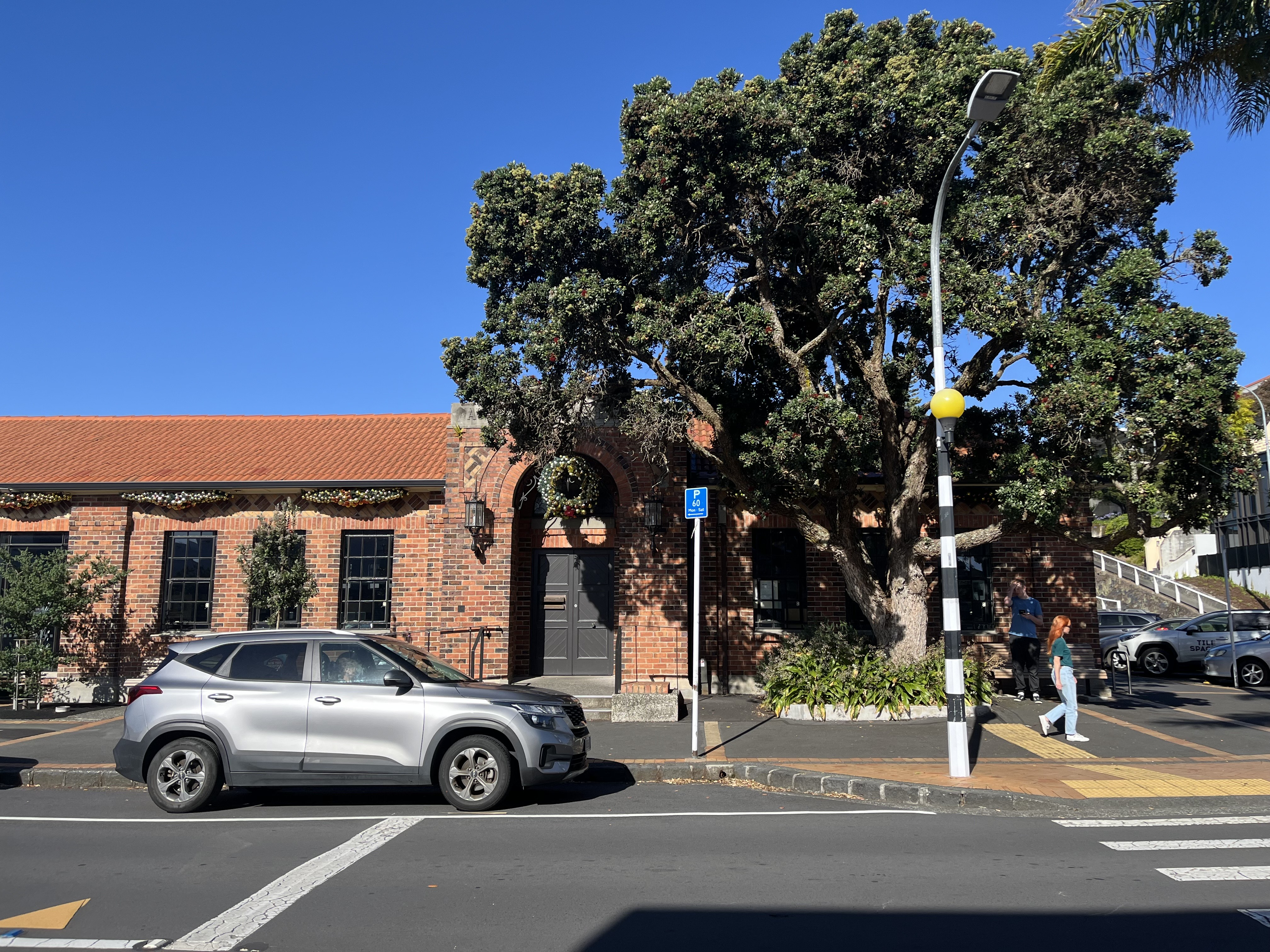
St Heliers Library wide view

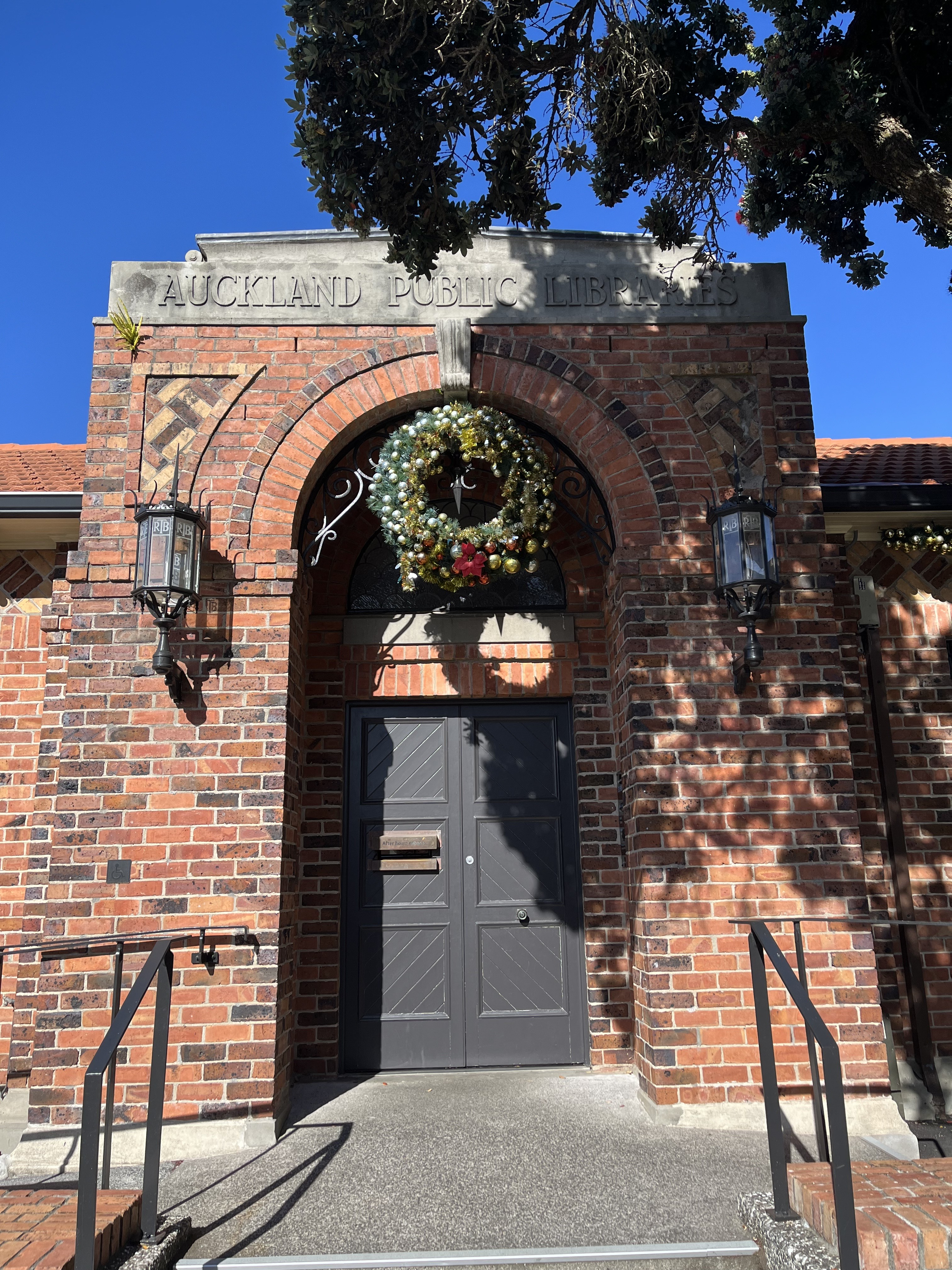
Facade and front door

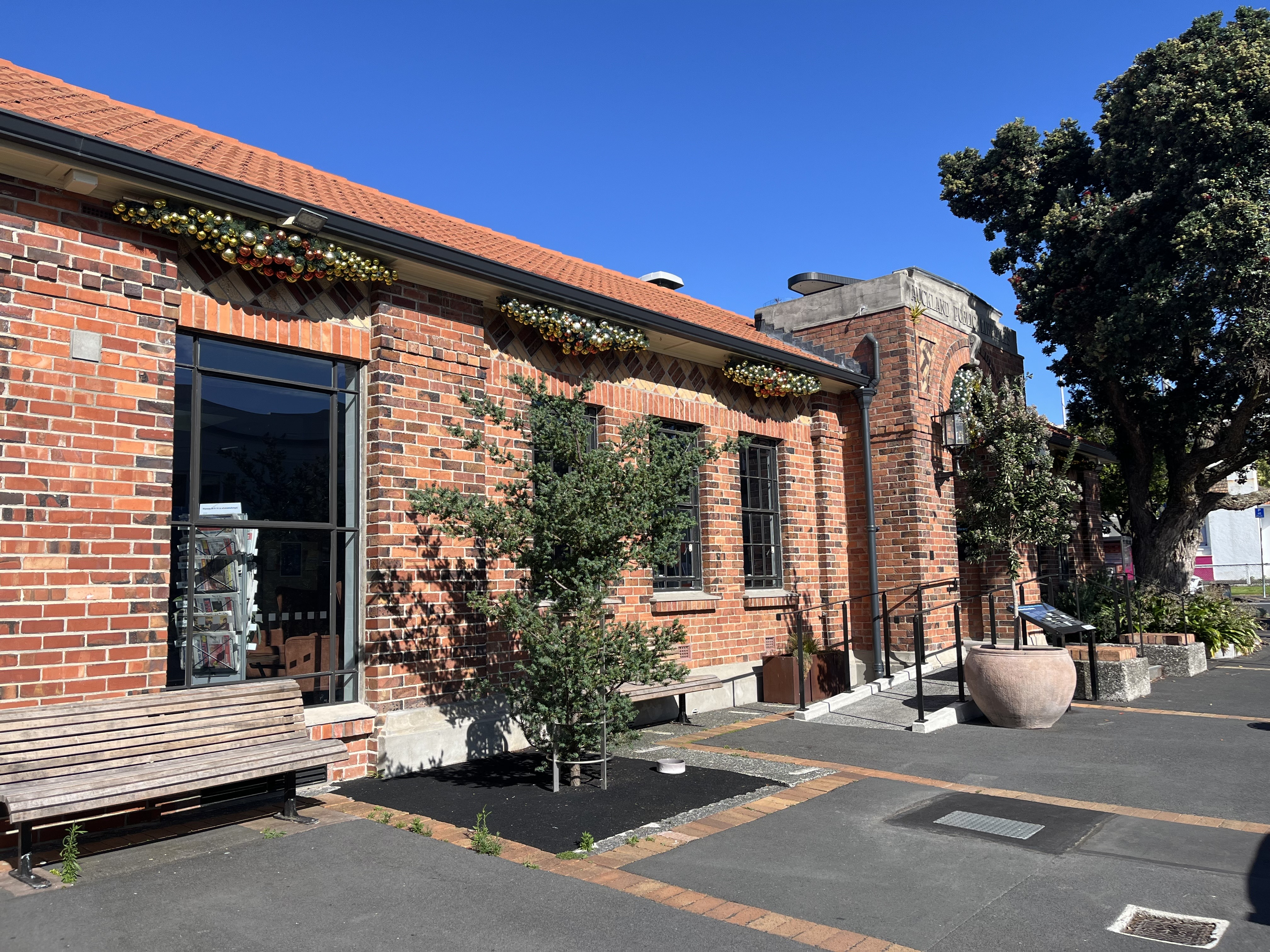
front side
