= Devonport Library =

Library in Devonport, Auckland, New Zealand

- Te Pātaka Kōrero o Te Hau Kapua
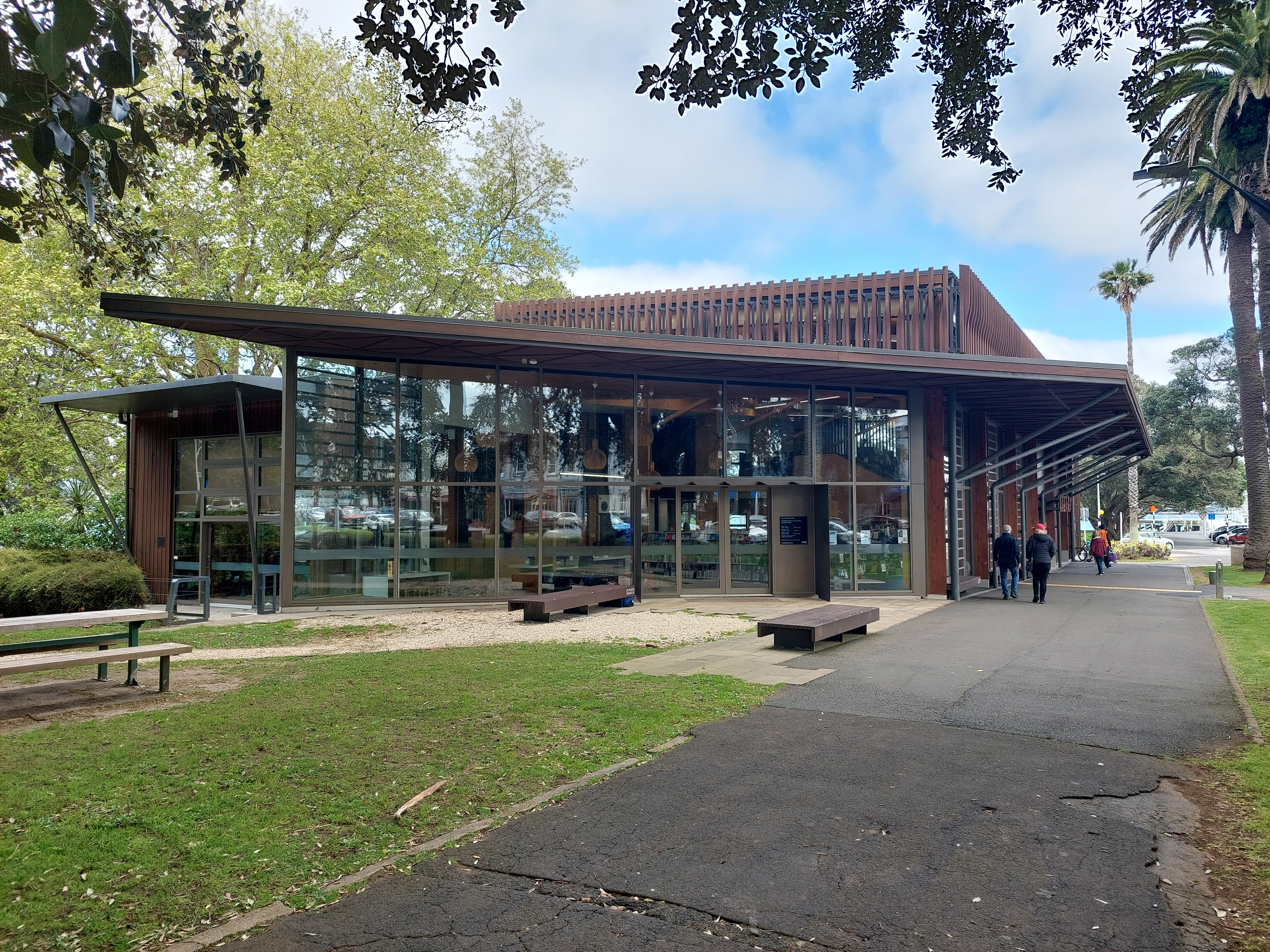
- Devonport Library in 2024
- 36°49′53″S 174°47′51″E
- Location: 2 Victoria Road, Devonport, New Zealand, 0624, New Zealand
- Type: Public library
- Established: 1878; 148 years ago
- Architect: Athfield Architects
- Branch of: Auckland Libraries

Collection
- Size: Floating

Other information
- Website: Official website

Devonport Library (Māori: Te Pātaka Kōrero o Te Hau Kapua) is a public library located in Windsor Reserve, Devonport, New Zealand. The library is part of the Auckland Council Libraries library system. The newest iteration of the library was constructed in a modernist style in February 2015.

== History ==
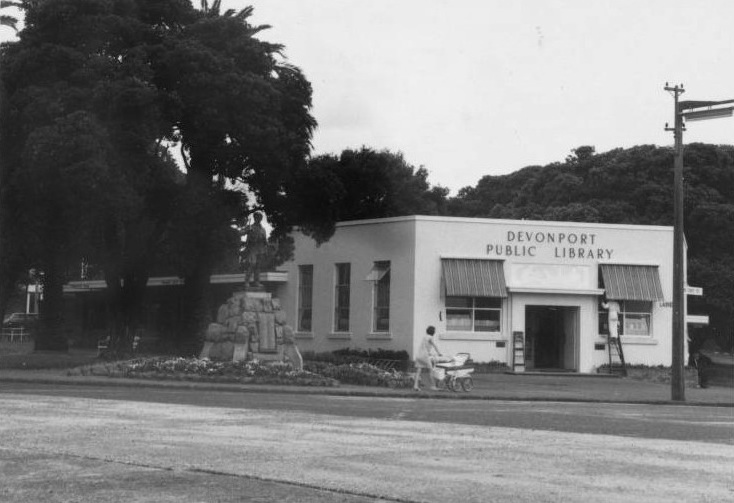
Exterior view of Devonport Public Library building in 1954

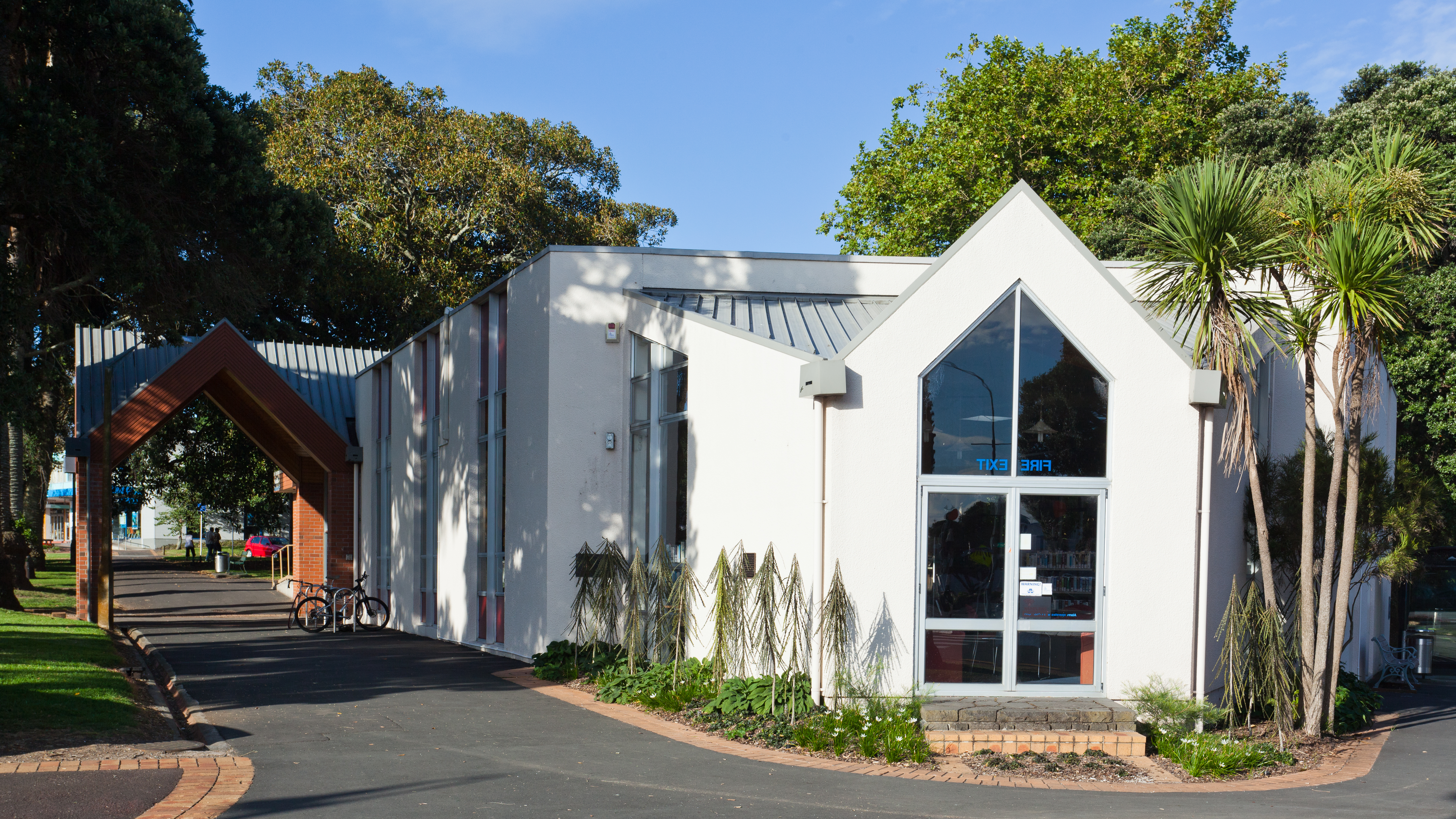
Devonport Library in 2011

Windsor Reserve has always been the location of the libraries in Devonport, but in the 1800s, before there was a library, the reserve was a landing point for naval vessels. It was named Naval Reserve for this reason.

The first library in Devonport was constructed in 1878. This first library was a section of the Devonport Borough Council's Council Chambers, designed by Edward Bartley. It was designed as a memorial building commemorating Queen Victoria's Jubilee. Known as the Devonport Free Public Reading Room and located inside the Chambers, the library was free to use and open to the community. This room was used until 31 March 1897, when it was closed and all of the books were disposed of.

The Devonport Library officially opened on 16 April 1930, as an independent library fun by the Devonport Borough Council. When the library opened, it was a subscription library run by local volunteers. Then in 1954, after the demolition of old Borough Council Chambers, a new library and a Plunket building were built on the site. Devonport Borough Council resumed ownership of the library on 26 February 1954, and all subsequent iterations of local government has held jurisdiction since. Rosetta Sadie Chapman was its first librarian. Since then, the library has been renovated at least twice in very different style iterations.

== Features ==
=== Boer War Memorial Fountain and Stone ===
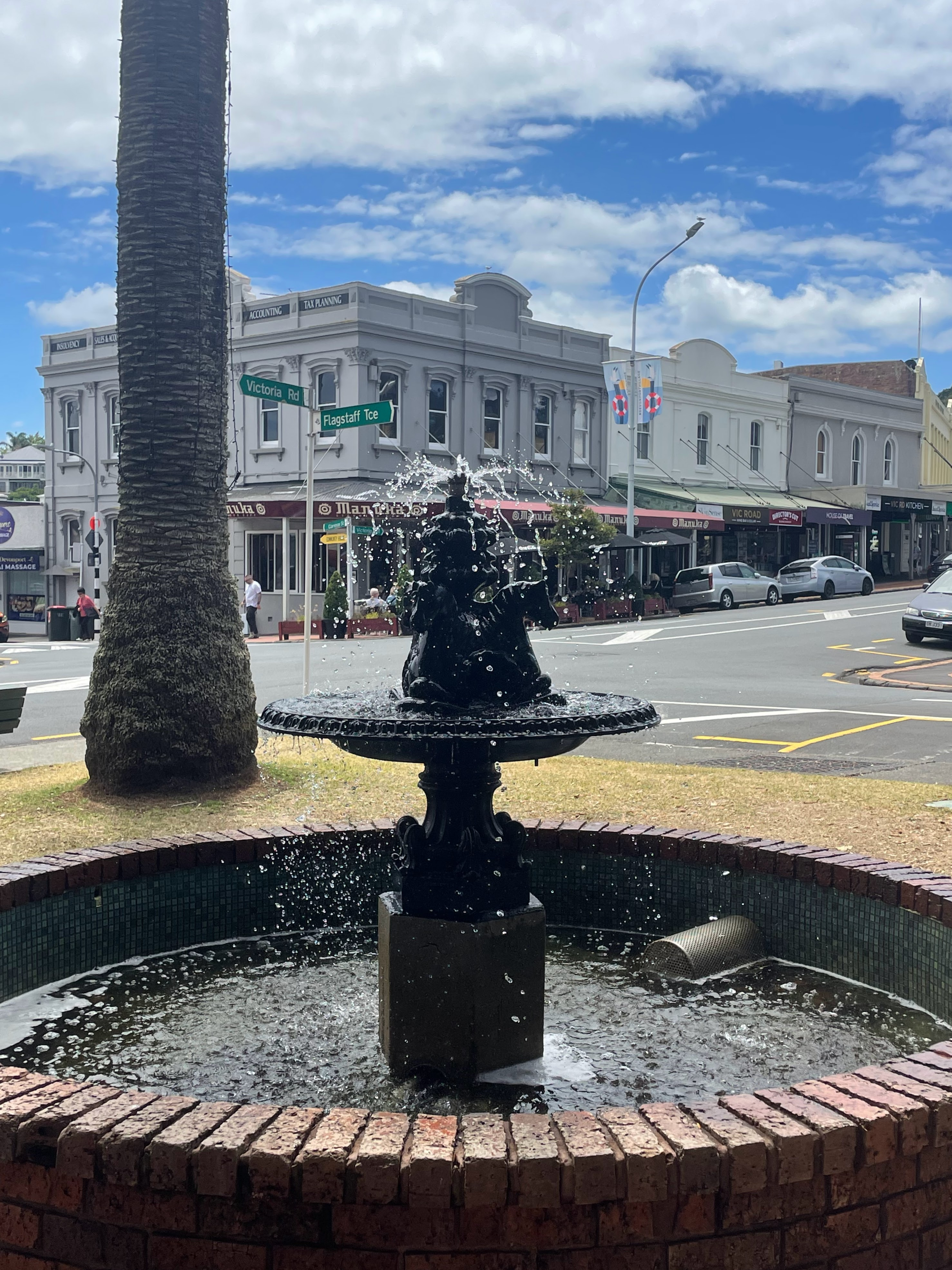
Fountain Memorial to J. P. Mays and H. Frankham

In 1903, a fountain was constructed as a memorial to John Peard Mays and Harold Frankham, the two soldiers from Devonport who served and perished in the Second Boer War. This was the first international war that the New Zealand army served in. The fountain's pool was cartouche-shaped, with the fountainhead in the middle atop a pile of basalt rubble and concrete. The fountainhead, designed by Devonport Borough Council's architect Edward Bartley, was made of bronze and depicted three horse heads, with scallop shells in between, all within an urn. The fountain was enclosed inside a concrete wall, which was where the memorial stone was set. Also within the concrete wall was a marble drinking fountain. It was beautified by The memorial was paid for by public subscription, which raised £115 for its construction. The fountain concept was used to incorporate the symbol of water as eternal life for the fallen soldiers. The fountain was unveiled by Mayor E. W. Alison in 1903 to an audience of 400 people.

By 1924, the fountain had fallen into disrepair, and the Department of Health ordered that the pool should be drained, and there were suggestions to remove the fountain altogether. After a child drowned in the pool, it was decided that it must be covered. In 1956, the fountain itself was removed and the pool was turned into the existing bandstand by laying a concrete slab over it. The slab was fenced and decorated with musical notes that read the beginning of "God Save the King". In 1985, the fountain was reinstated in a smaller, rounder pool and a plaque was added that recognised former Devonport mayor P. G. Sheehan. This fountain continues to reside on the northern-most corner of Windsor Reserve, Victoria Road and Flagstaff Terrace. In 2009, the bronze horses were stolen from the statue and were never recovered. In 2010, they were replaced by cast iron ones, and the entire fountain was painted black to match. There has been public comment on the quality of the replacement horses, which do not reflect the refinement of the original sculptures.

Plaques for Memorial Fountain and Bandstand

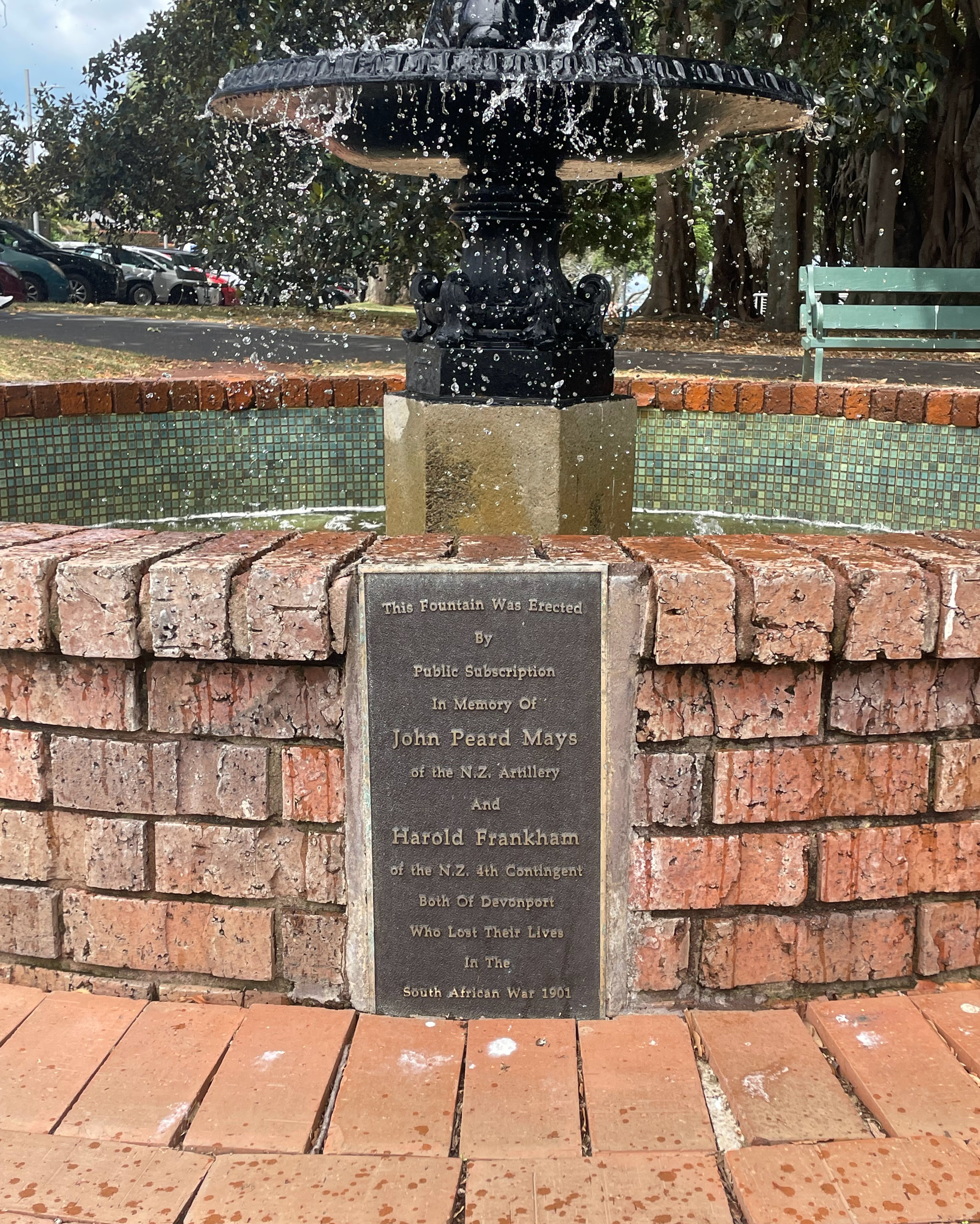
Plaque on memorial fountain

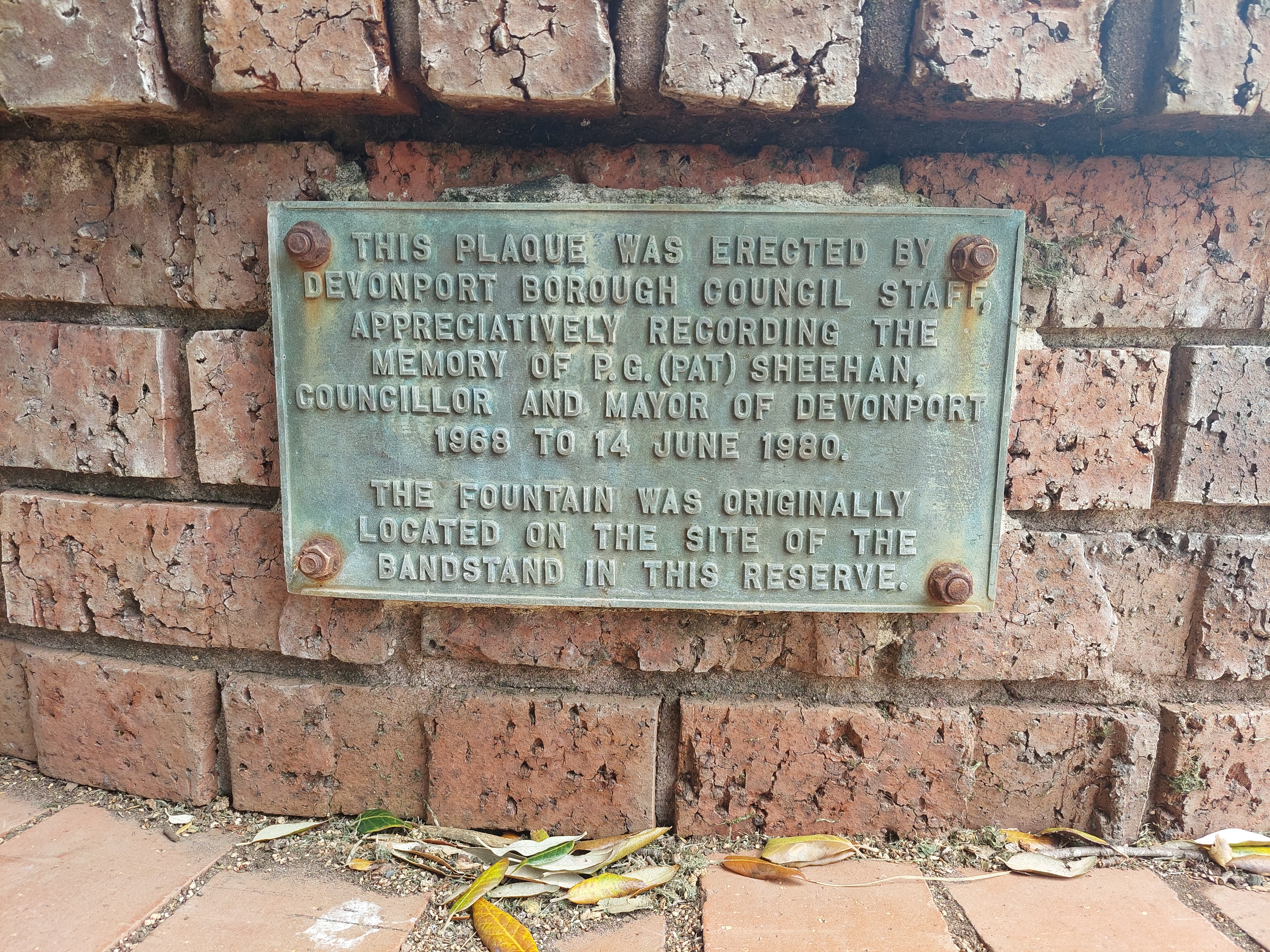
Modern plaque on memorial fountain for Mayor P. G. Sheehan

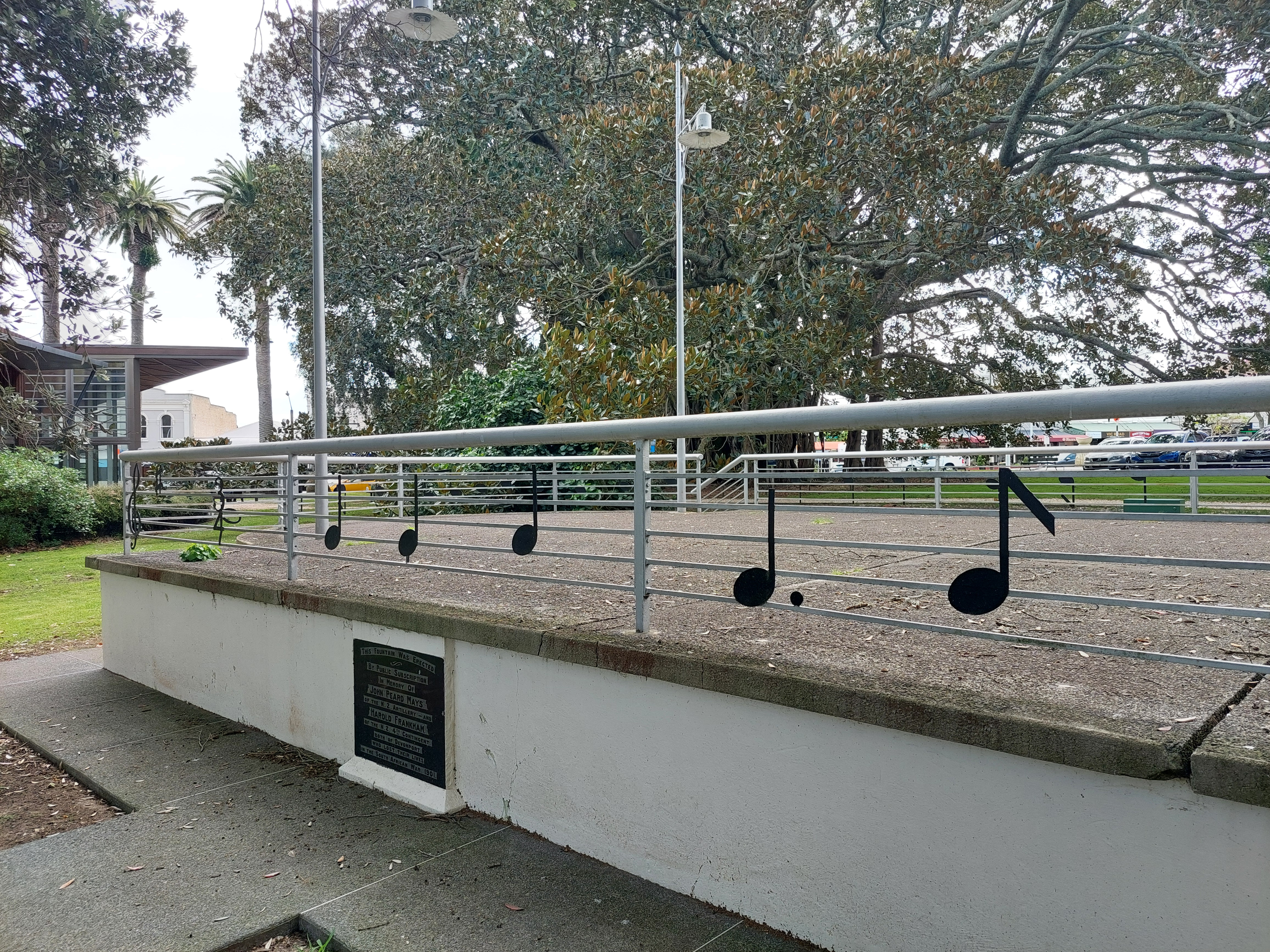
Devonport bandstand, where the memorial fountain used to be. The notes around the stand read the beginning of "God Save the King"

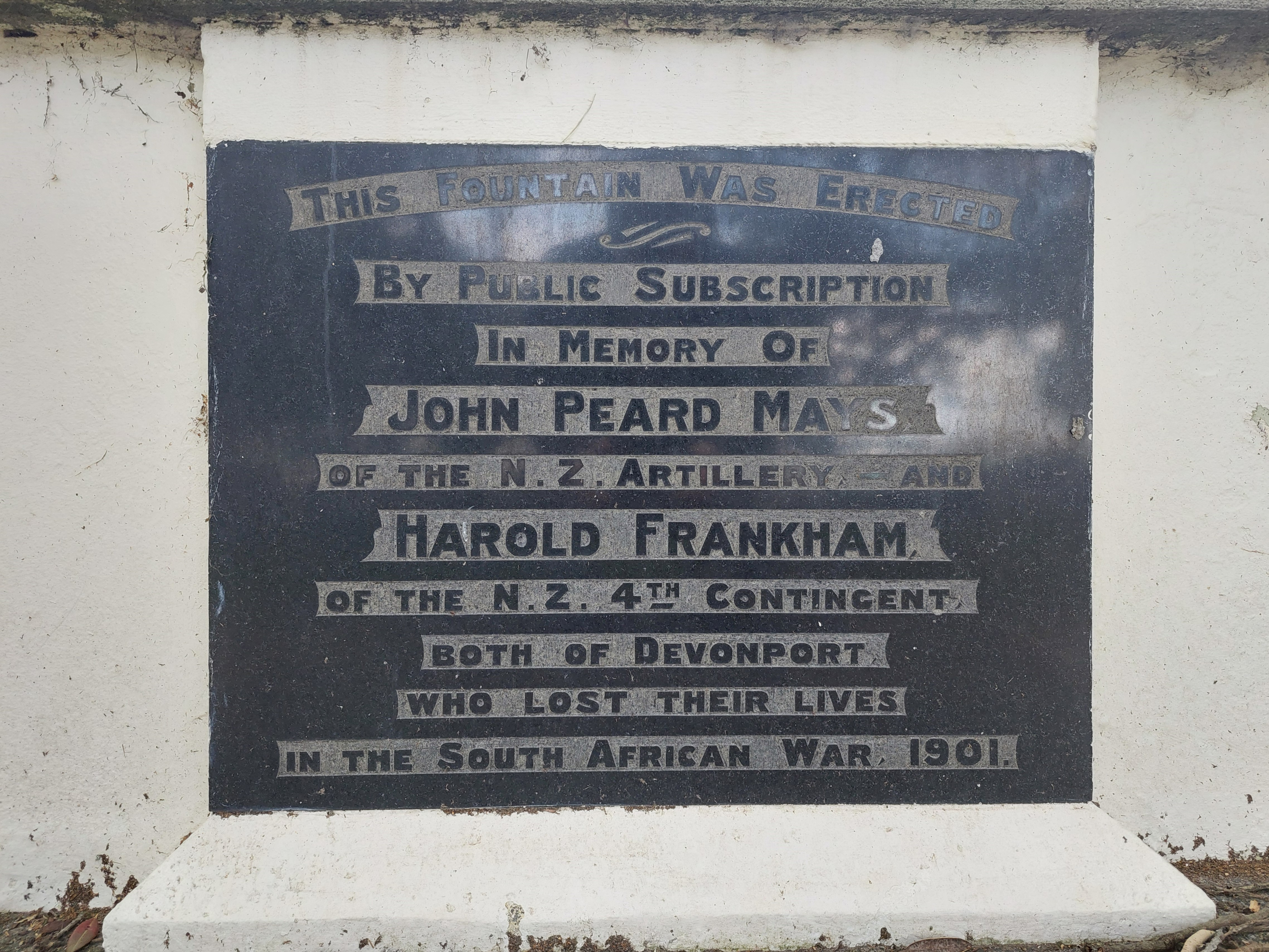
Memorial stone, now in bandstand

=== First World War Memorial ===
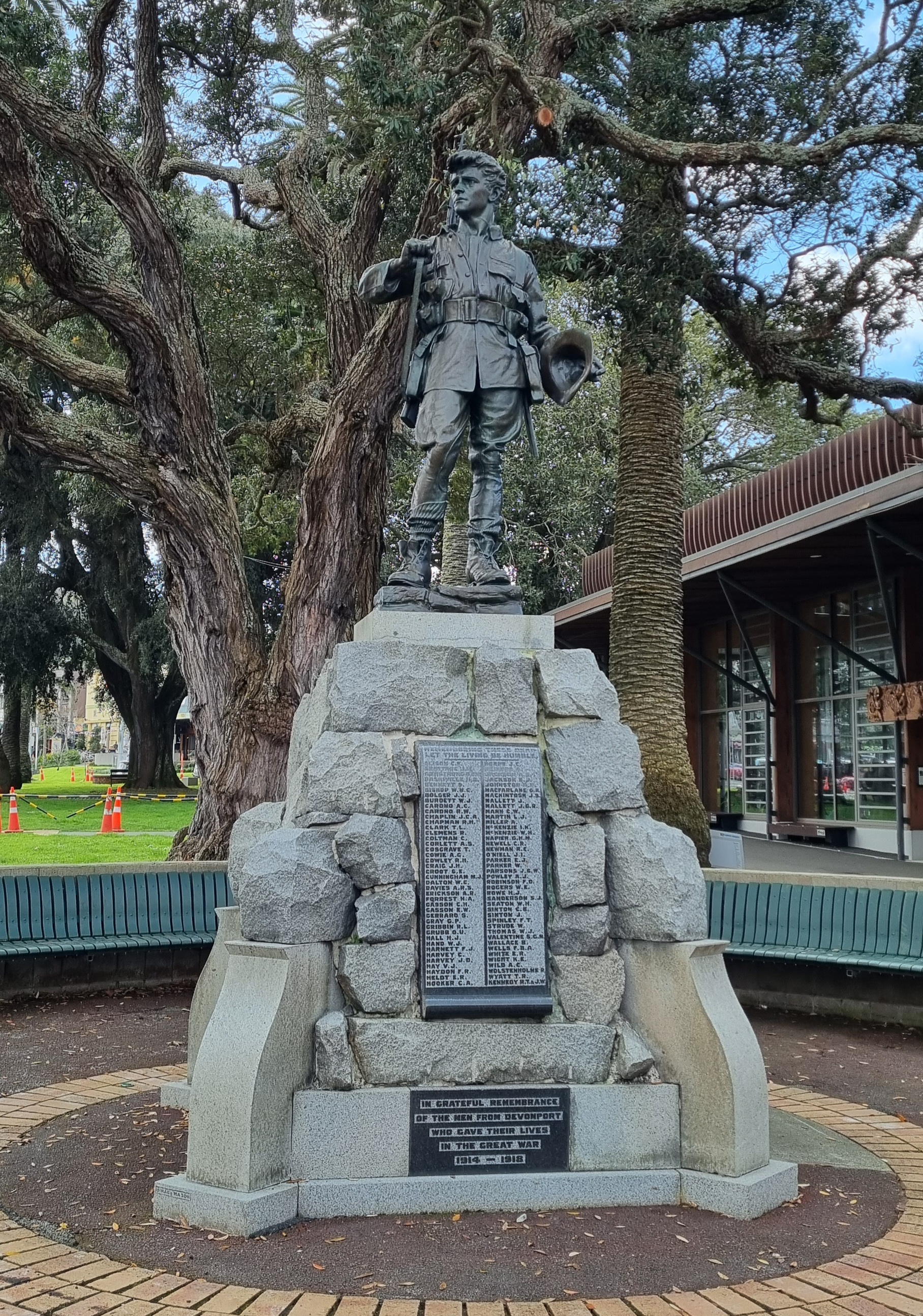

Devonport's First World War memorial stands at the corner of Victoria Road and King Edward Parade, facing south towards the ferry building. It is a category II Heritage site. It is surrounded by a semicircular stone wall and a bench. The statue depicts a young soldier in the service uniform that would have been worn by soldiers at Gallipoli. He is 2.1 metres tall, standing on a Coromandel and Bluff granite base, with a rocky and irregular appearance. He is described as the 'untidy soldier', with scruffy clothing, his hat in his hand and his shoelaces undone. Also unique about the statue is the soldier's very life-like, classically 'New Zealand' face, as many other war memorials at the time were mass produced from Italian firms and therefore 'lacked type and character'. There are plaques on each side listing the Devonport residents lost at war from both World Wars and the Second Boer War.

The statue was commissioned by Devonport residents in 1922, after lengthy discussions of what type of memorial would be suitable for the town. There was consideration for a library, a gymnasium, a Corinthian column and an astronomical observatory at the top of Mount Victoria. There was a public competition for the design, which was won by Frank Lynch. He was paid £570 for his artwork through public subscriptions. The statue was cast by A. B. Burton of Thames Ditton foundry, London. Both men's signatures are on the artwork, with Lynch's on the soldier's left shoe and Burton's on the right. The memorial was unveiled in 1924 by Lord Jellicoe to a crowd of more than 4000 people. To this day, this statue is used for commemorations for the Devonport area, especially Anzac day.

Plaques on the Devonport WWI Memorial

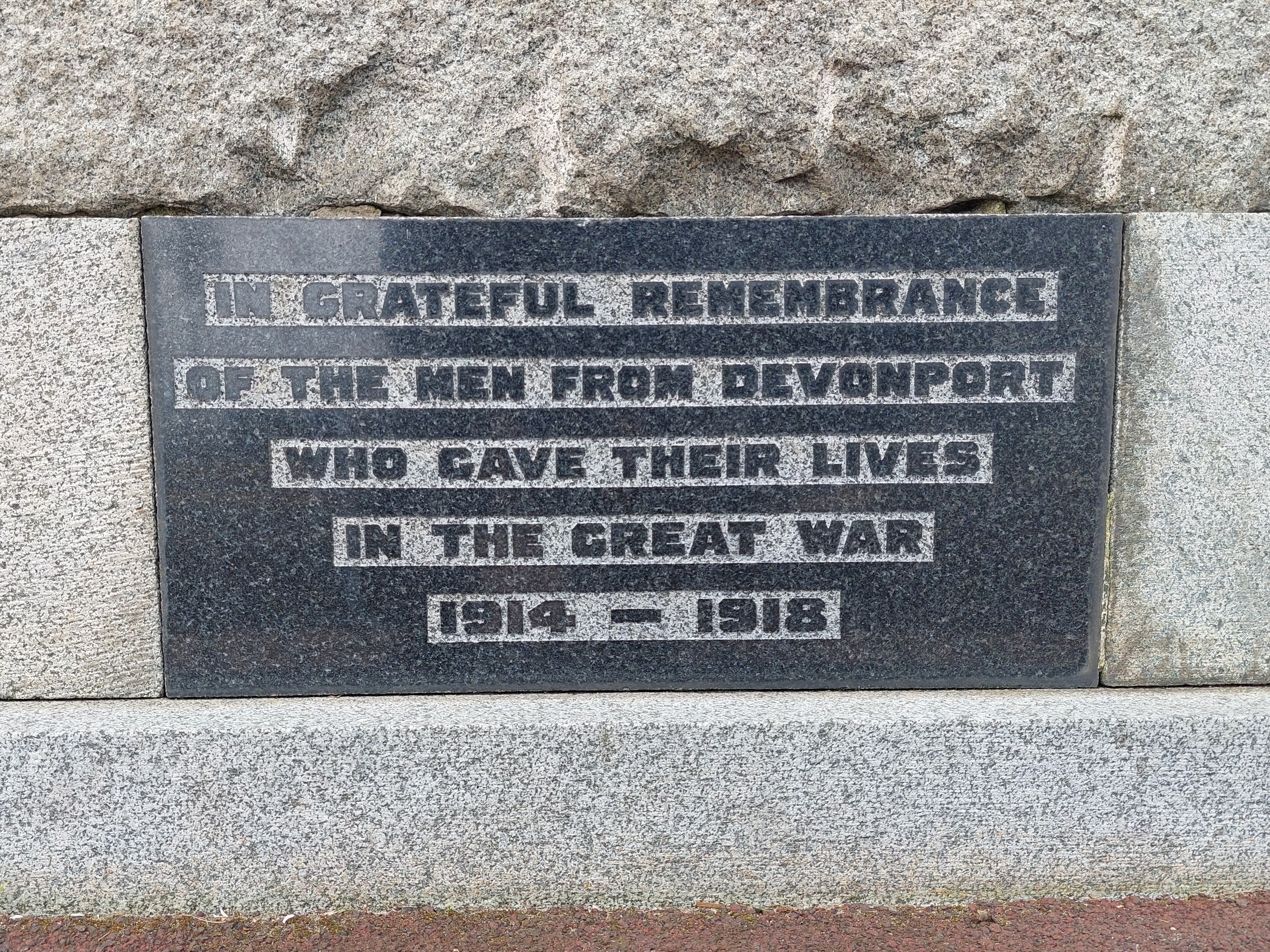
Plaque for fallen soldiers from WWI from Devonport

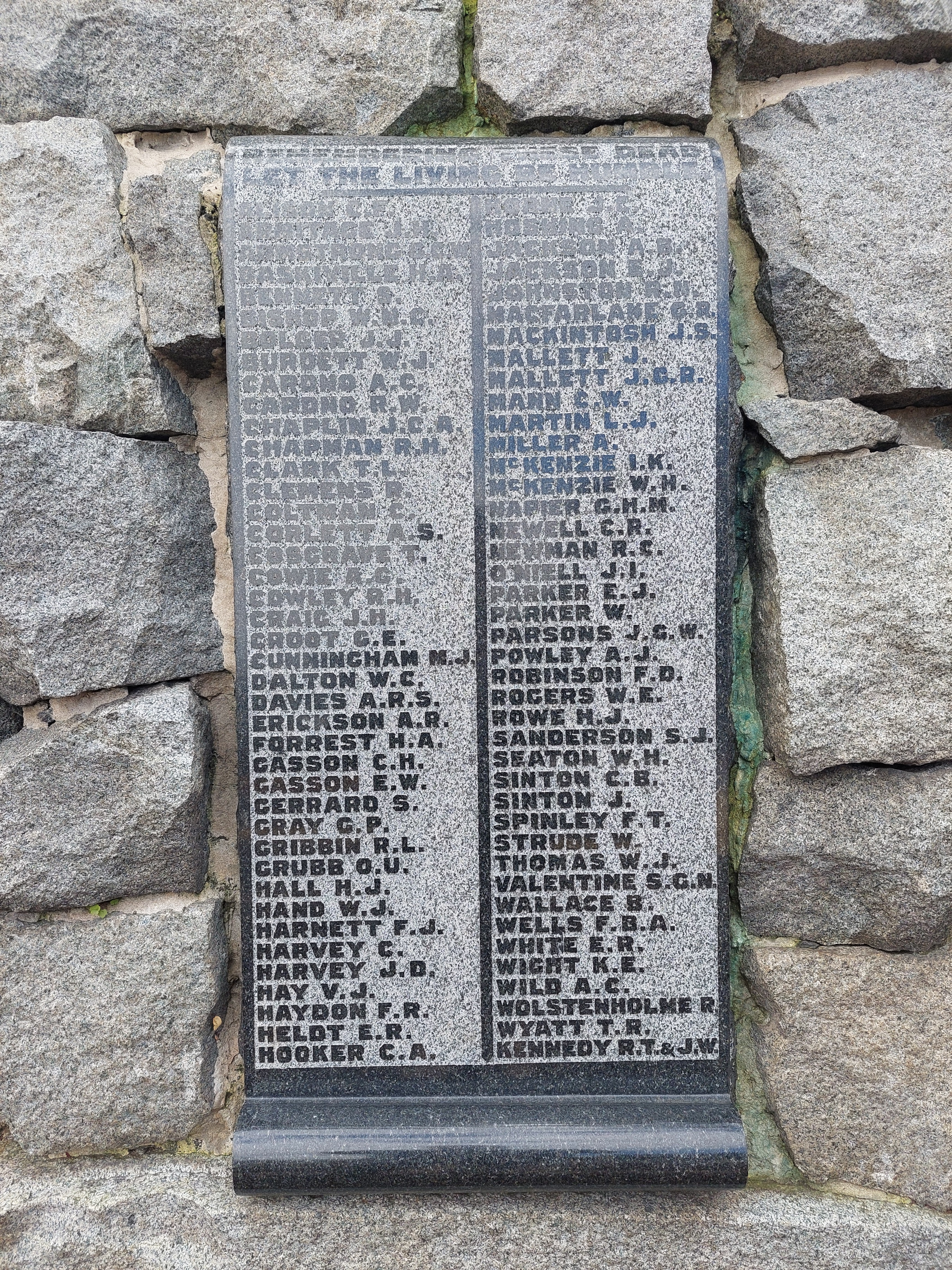
Plaque for fallen soldiers from WWI from Devonport

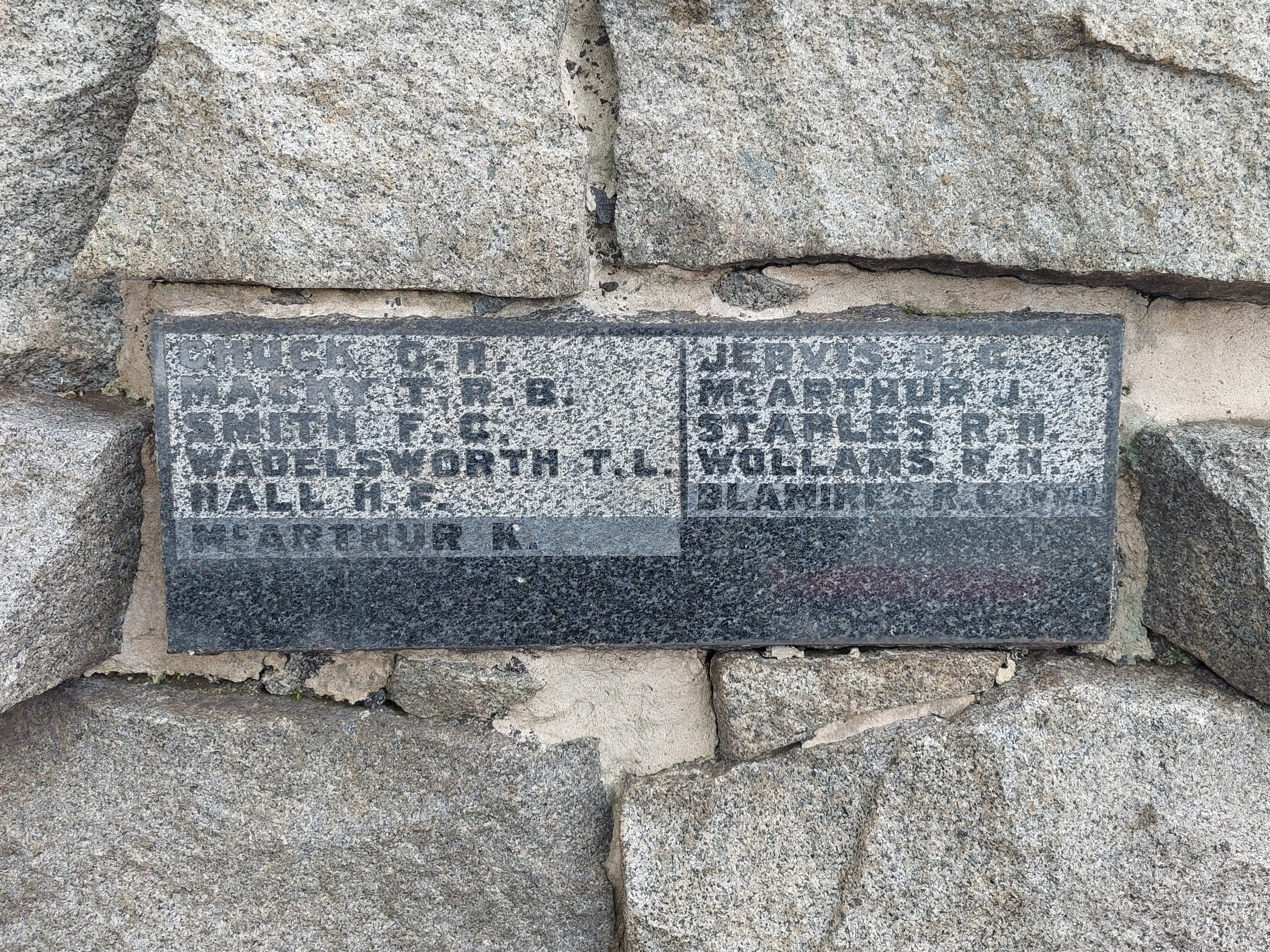
Plaque for fallen soldiers from WWI from Devonport - additional

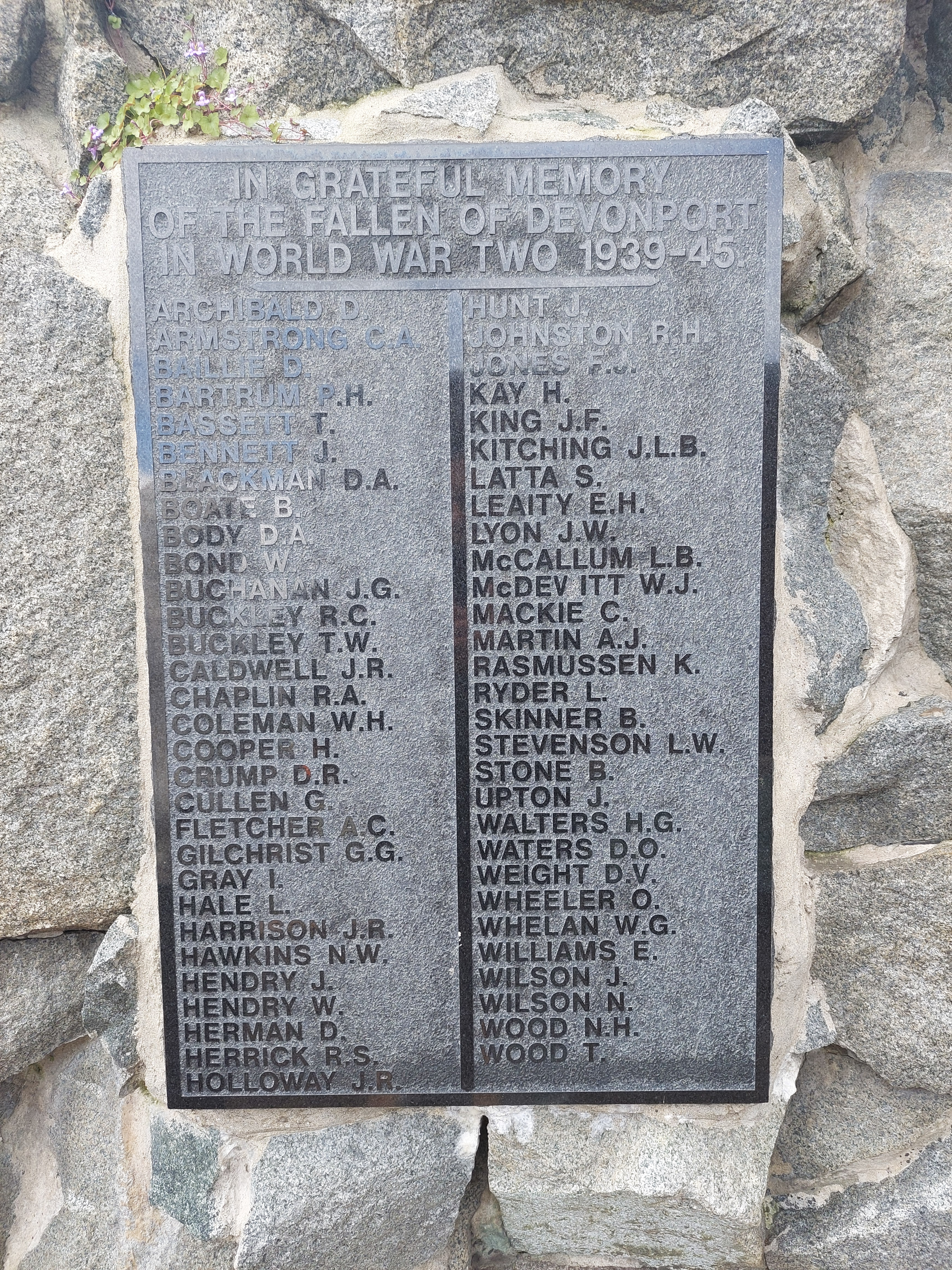
Plaque for fallen soldiers from WWII from Devonport

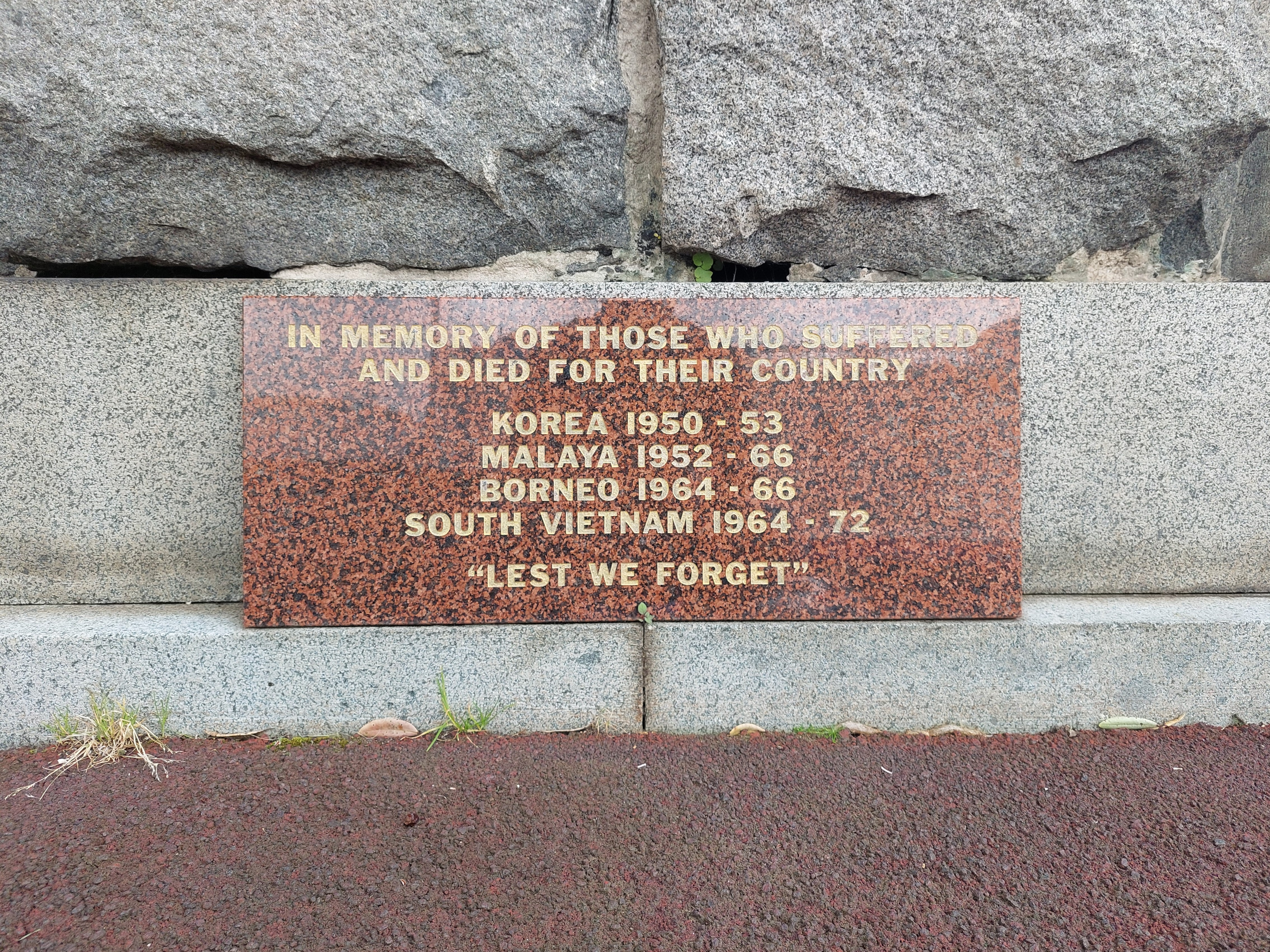
Plaque for fallen soldiers from Korea, Malaya, Borneo and South Vietnam from Devonport

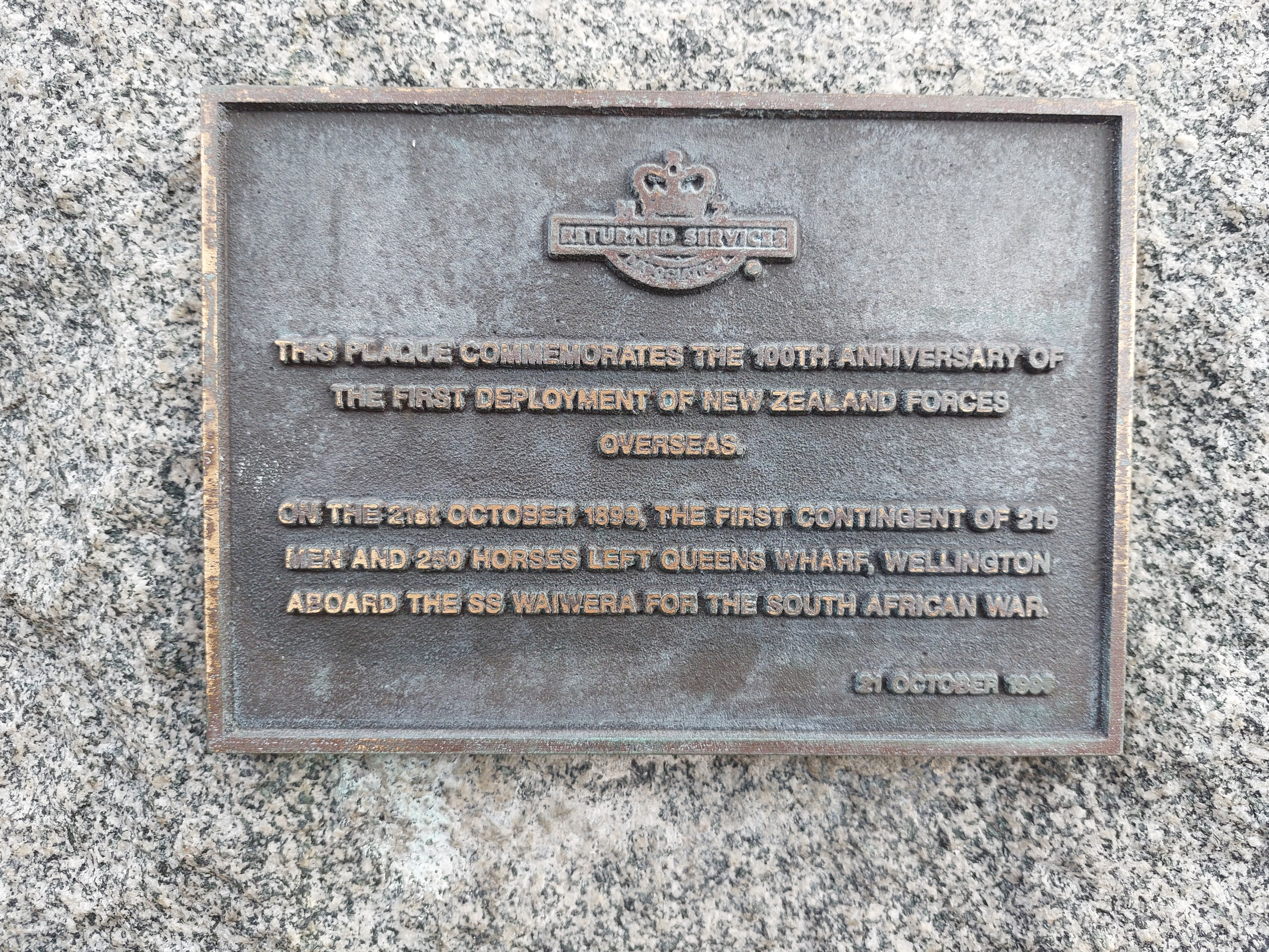
Plaque for anniversary of the first deployment

=== Benjamin the Library Cat Statue ===
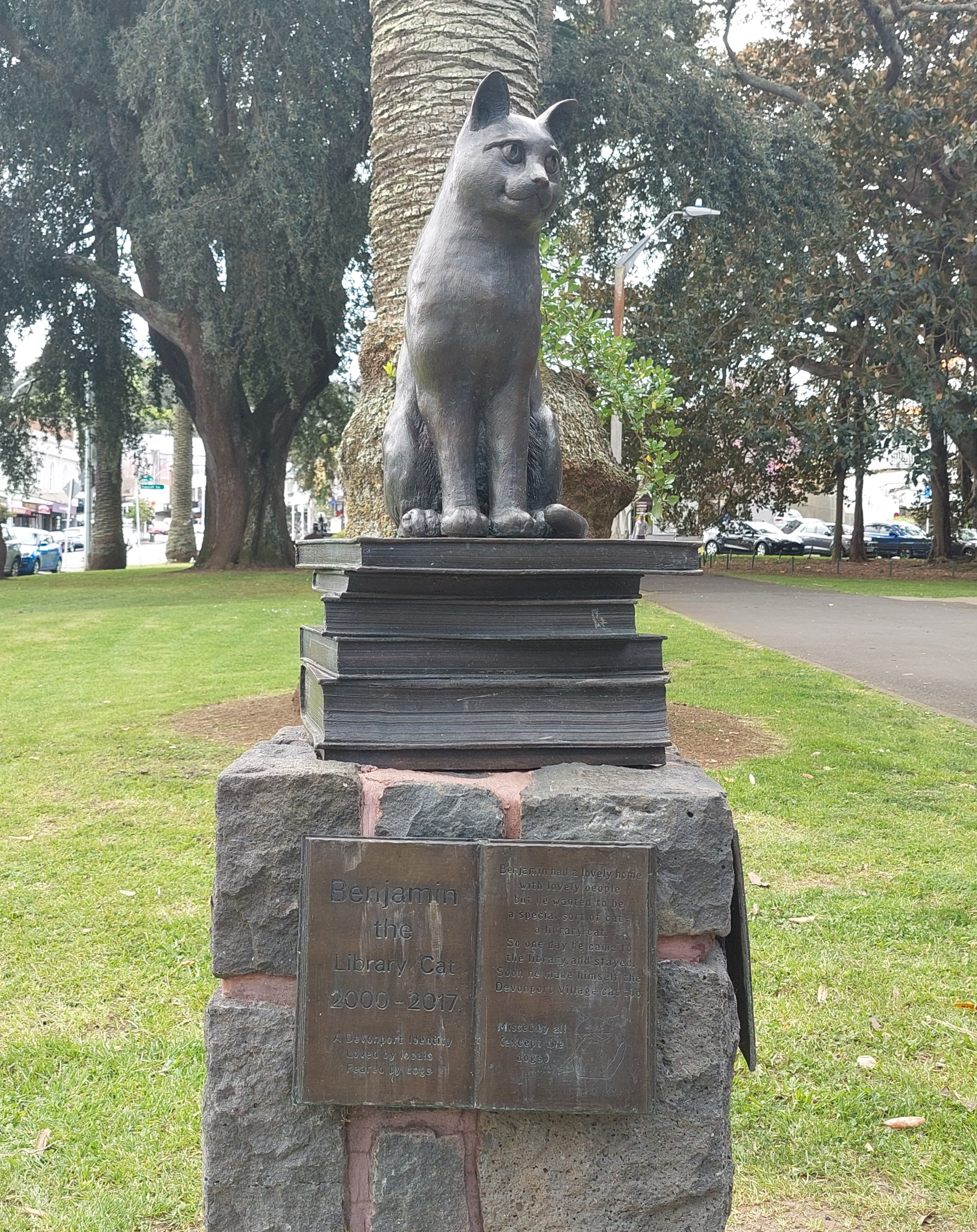
Statue of Benjamin the Library Cat

Benjamin was a friendly cat that lived at the library in the 2000s and 2010s. He could often be found walking on the streets of Devonport and in shops, but had a special love of the library. In 2002, the library became the cat's owner when his original owners could not keep the cat contained on their property. He was such an essential part of the library that a cat flap was installed in the 2015 library renovation. He was featured in a picture book, Benjamin's Book of Library Fun by author Arthur Whelan. In 2016, he survived being hit by a car which broke his sternum, but finally met his end on 27 January 2017 when he was hit by a car when he was sleeping in a street gutter. The community of Devonport raised public funds for a bronze statue of him to be made. The statue was sculpted by librarian Fiona Startup and depicts the cat upon a stack of books with a plinth and an inscription below. The bronze casting was completed by Richard Wells of the Artworks foundry for the subsidised price of $9,000, rather than the expected $25,000 price point. The statue is often dressed up by local residents for various public holidays.
