= Te Manawa (Westgate) =

Community hub in Auckland, New Zealand

- Westgate Library and Multi-Purpose Facility
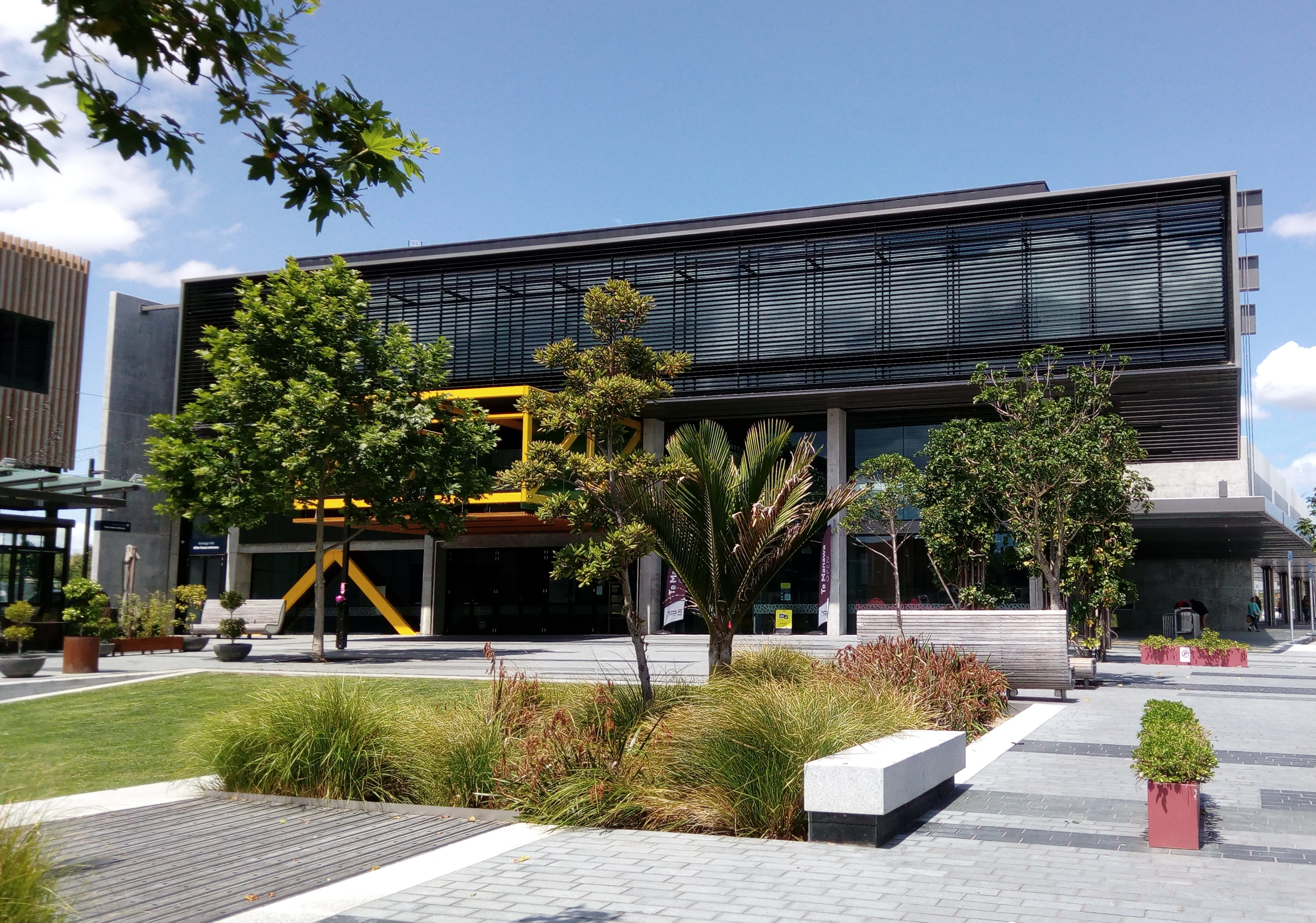
- Te Manawa exterior December 2019. The purpose of this building is expressed through a "stacked book" effect articulated on the facade.
- 36°49′07″S 174°36′36″E
- Location: 11 Kohuhu Lane, Westgate, Auckland, New Zealand
- Type: Public library and community hub
- Established: 26 March 2019; 7 years ago
- Service area: Hobsonville, Massey, Westgate, West Harbour, Whenuapai
- Branch of: Auckland Libraries

Collection
- Size: Floating

Other information
- Website: www.aucklandlibraries.govt.nz

Te Manawa (Westgate) is a community hub located in Auckland, New Zealand. It is Auckland Council’s first fully-integrated community hub which unofficially opened its doors to the public on 26 March 2019. The official opening by the Mayor of Auckland Phil Goff took place on 6 April 2019 which was followed by a community open day attracting around 5,000 visitors. Te Manawa's services and resources include a library, Council Services, rooms for hire, commercial kitchen, studios, creative spaces, community programmes, work and study areas along with a Citizens Advice Bureau. It immediately serves the suburbs of Westgate, Massey, West Harbour and Hobsonville along with visitors from across Auckland.

== Building ==
Te Manawa (formally known as Westgate Library and Multi-Purpose Facility) is the central piece of work of the new Westgate town centre development. It was designed by Warren and Mahoney and built by Fletcher Construction. This project won the New Zealand Institute of Architects Auckland Awards Public Architecture in 2020 and DINZ (Designers Institute of New Zealand) Best Awards 2019 – Silver Pin - Public & Institutional Spaces. Its interior design was one of the four shortlisted Interior Awards Winners under Civil category in 2019.

Te Manawa has been awarded a 5 Green Star - NZ Custom Design Certified Rating by the New Zealand Green Building Council (NZGBC). Its green design includes stormwater detention and re-use, solar power and sensory heating and air-conditioning.

=== Naming ===
The facility was gifted the te reo Māori name 'Te Manawa' by Matua Heta Tobin of Ngāti Whātua Ngā Maunga Whakahii o Kaipara who had also gifted the name Te Pūmanawa (the beating heart) for the wider Westgate development and the Square which adjoins Te Manawa. Te Manawa means ‘the heart’ and reflects the buildings purpose to be at the heart of the community, a place where people are the life blood.

Te reo Māori names were also gifted for the internal rooms to reflect the activity and thinking that would happen in these areas. Sadly, Heta Tobin passed away before Te Manawa opened but his gift remains as a legacy to the building project and the community.

=== Art ===
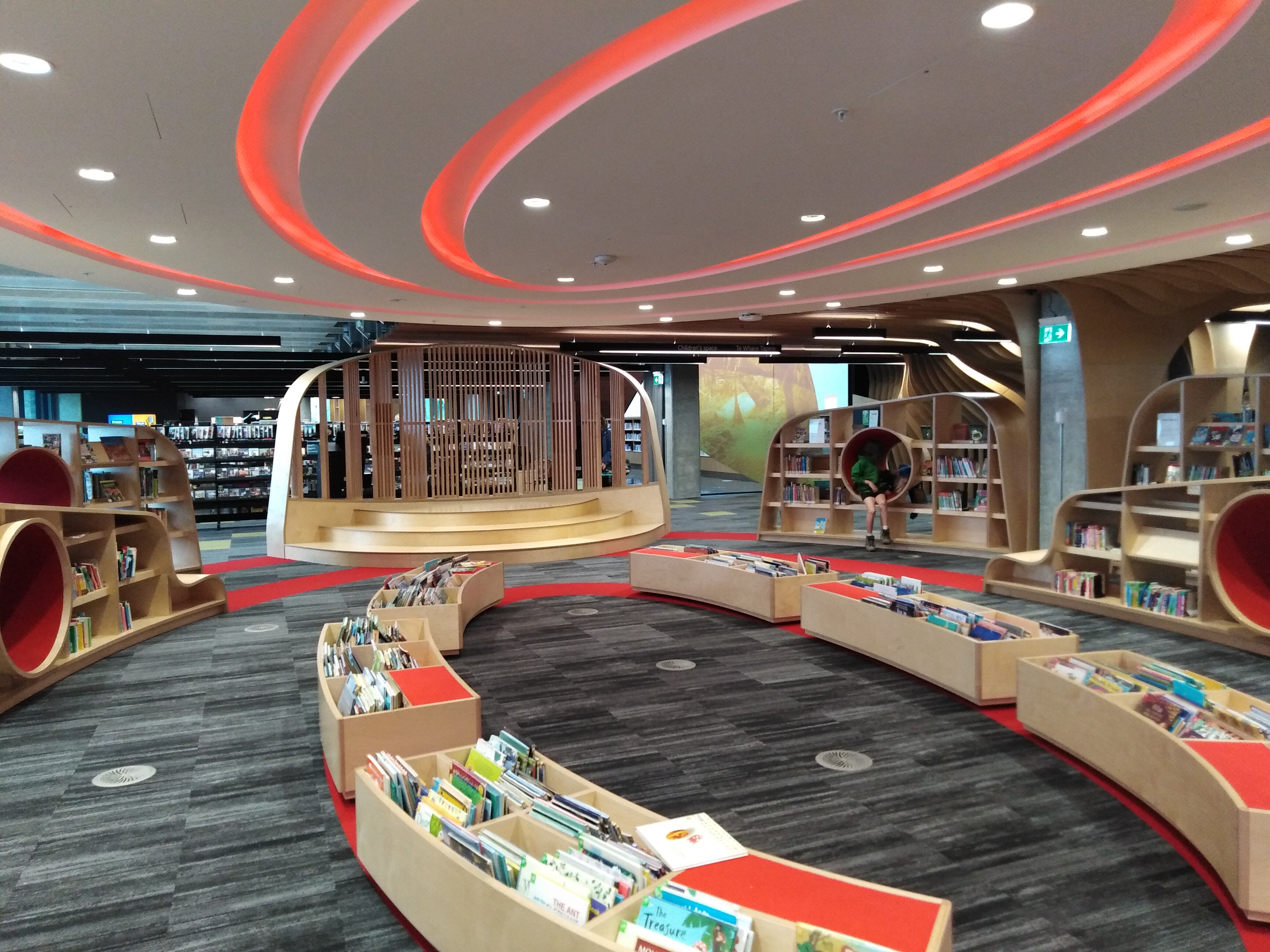
Te Whare Tapere - Children's Space designed by Robin Rawstorne

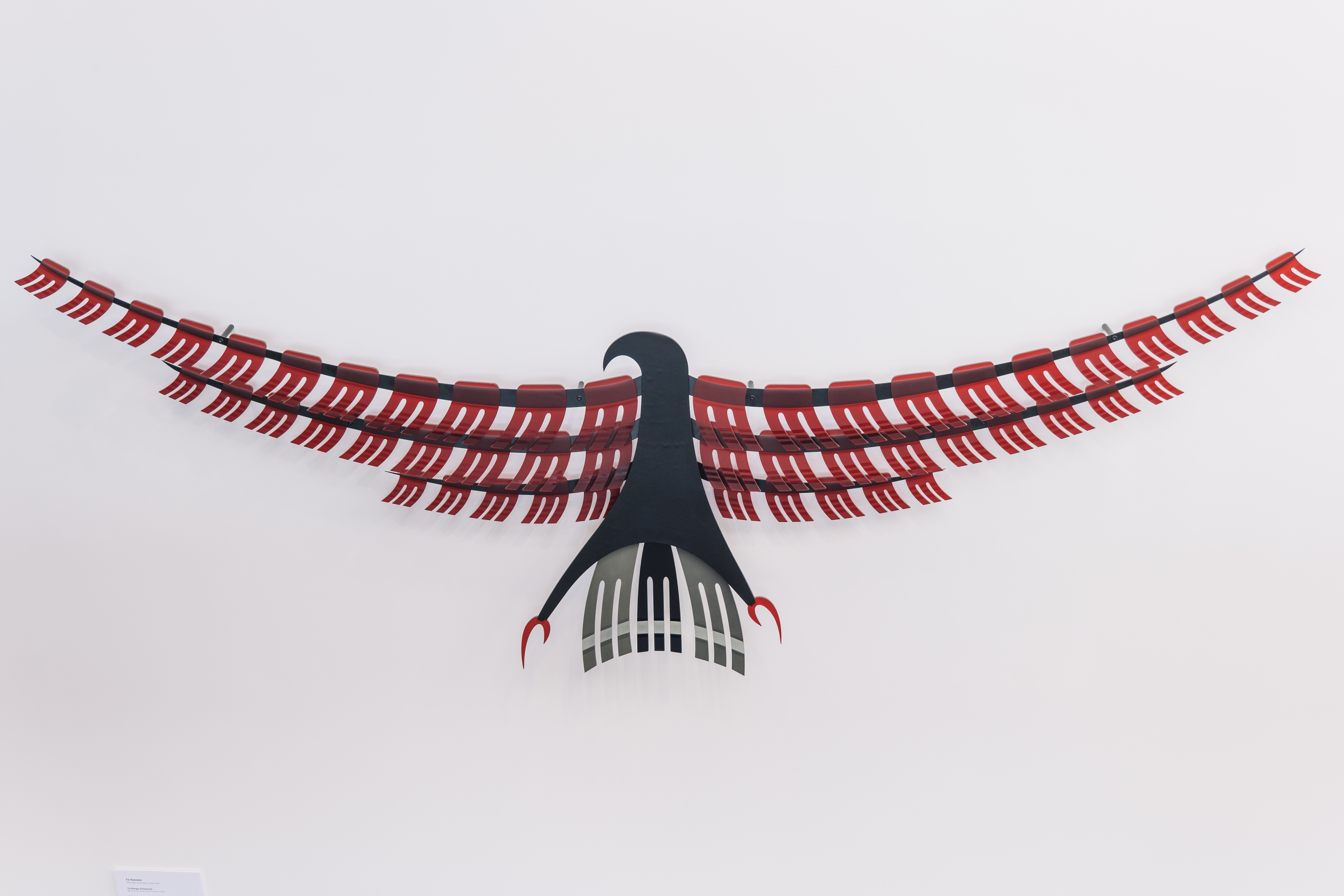
Te Kaeaea by Te Rongo Kirkwood, 2019.

A distinctive feature and anchoring piece of interior architectural work is in the children's area on Level 1 named 'Te Whare Tapere' (meaning a place of entertainment, story-telling, dance, games, music and other entertainment). The space was designed by multidisciplinary award-winning artist Robin Rawstorne and was inspired by the concept of a pool in the middle of a forest glade with ripples radiating outwards. The ripples reflect the growing levels of a young readers development. The space was designed to encourage play, ownership and investigation and includes a stage for story-telling and performances, nooks to curl up in and moveable book bins to change the area's shape and size.

On 9 July 2020 a glass sculpture by Auckland artist Te Rongo Kirkwood (Ngai Tai ki Tamaki, Wai o Hua, Te Kawerau a Maki) was installed in the area named 'Pūrerehua'. The art work, named 'Te Kaeaea', is a life size representation of the now extinct Hokioi (Haast's Eagle). With a wingspan over 3 metres, these huge and powerful native birds used to prey on Moa and were the largest eagles known to have existed. They lived on the outer fringes of the forest and would swoop down on prey from high heights. There are a number of Hakangeri (war-chants) in Tamaki Makaurau and in Waikato that talk about this bird.

In December 2020 the artwork 'Te Ara Tiatia' by Mei Hill (Ngati Whatua, Ngapuhi, Te Aupouri, Te Rarawa) was installed. Consisting of three glass panels on the exterior of Te Manawa the work is Inspired by the late kaumatua, Heta Tobin, who had long stressed the importance of learning and celebrating Matauranga Māori - Māori Knowledge. Te Ara Tiatia is one of the first public artworks of scale to celebrate Te Reo Maori. It is also a learning tool for the viewer to explore and discover 'kupu' meaningful to their own journey.

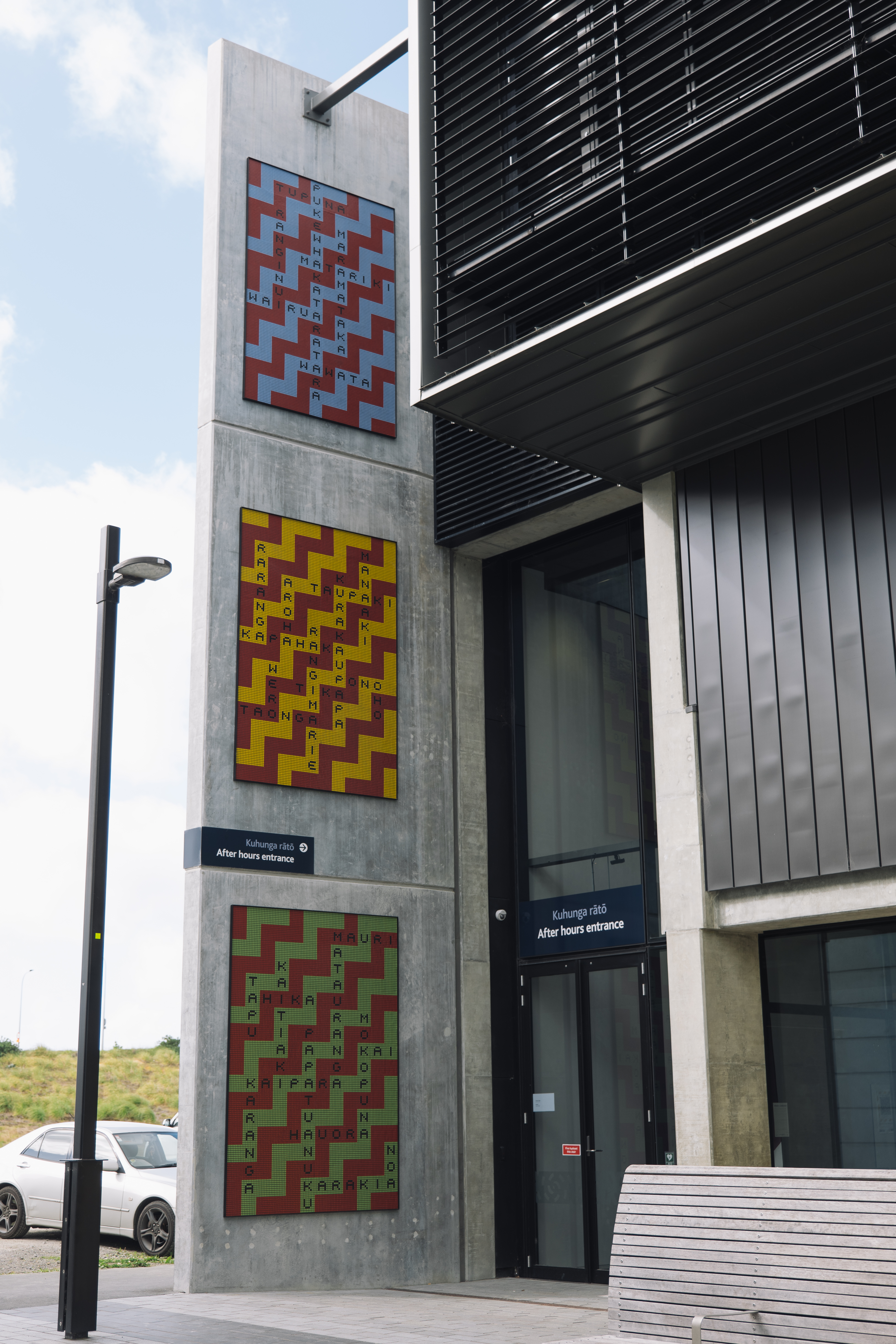
Te Ara Tiatia by Mei Hill, 2020

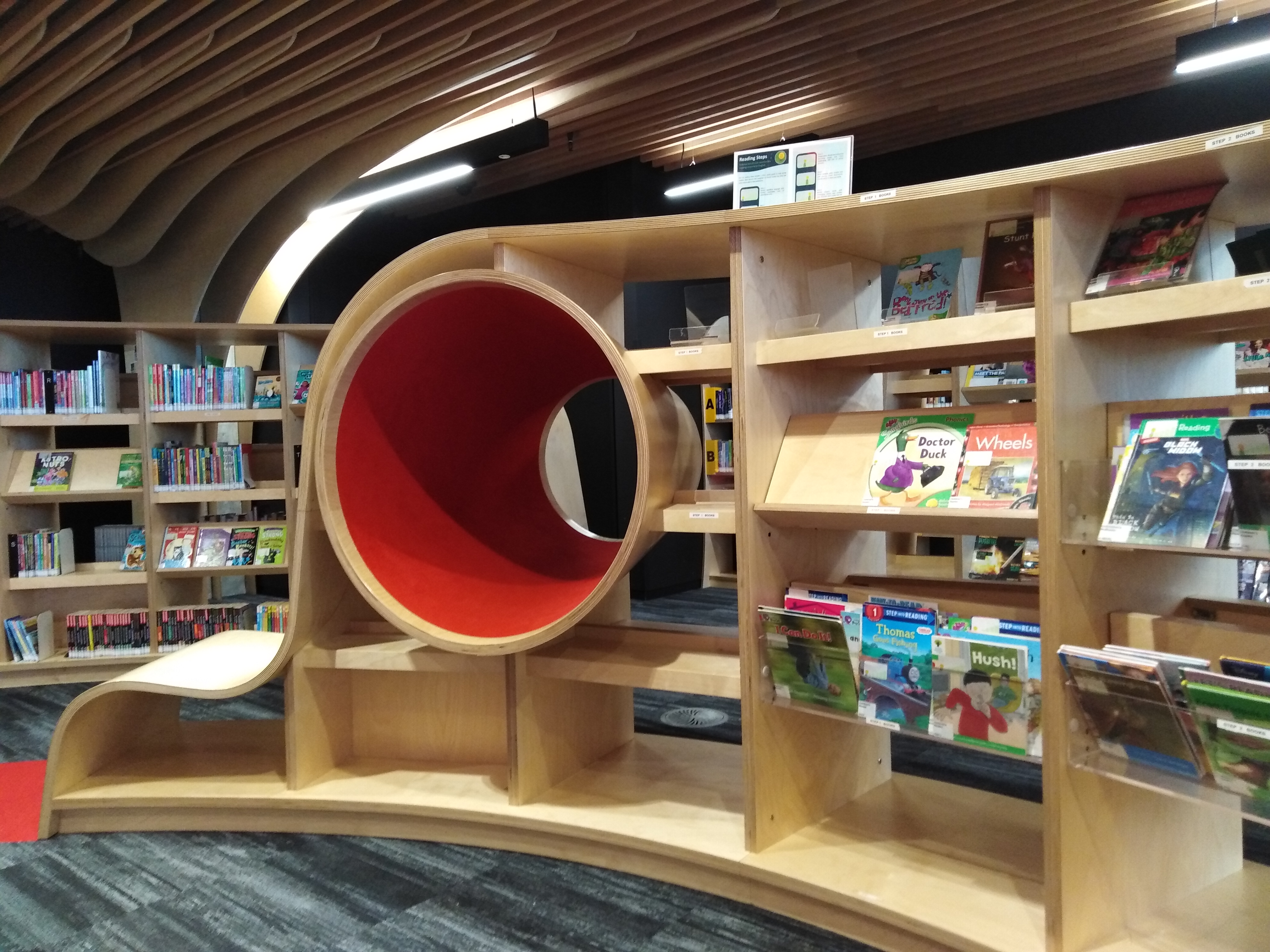
Nooks at Te Whare Tapere, Children's Space

== Services ==
=== Library services ===
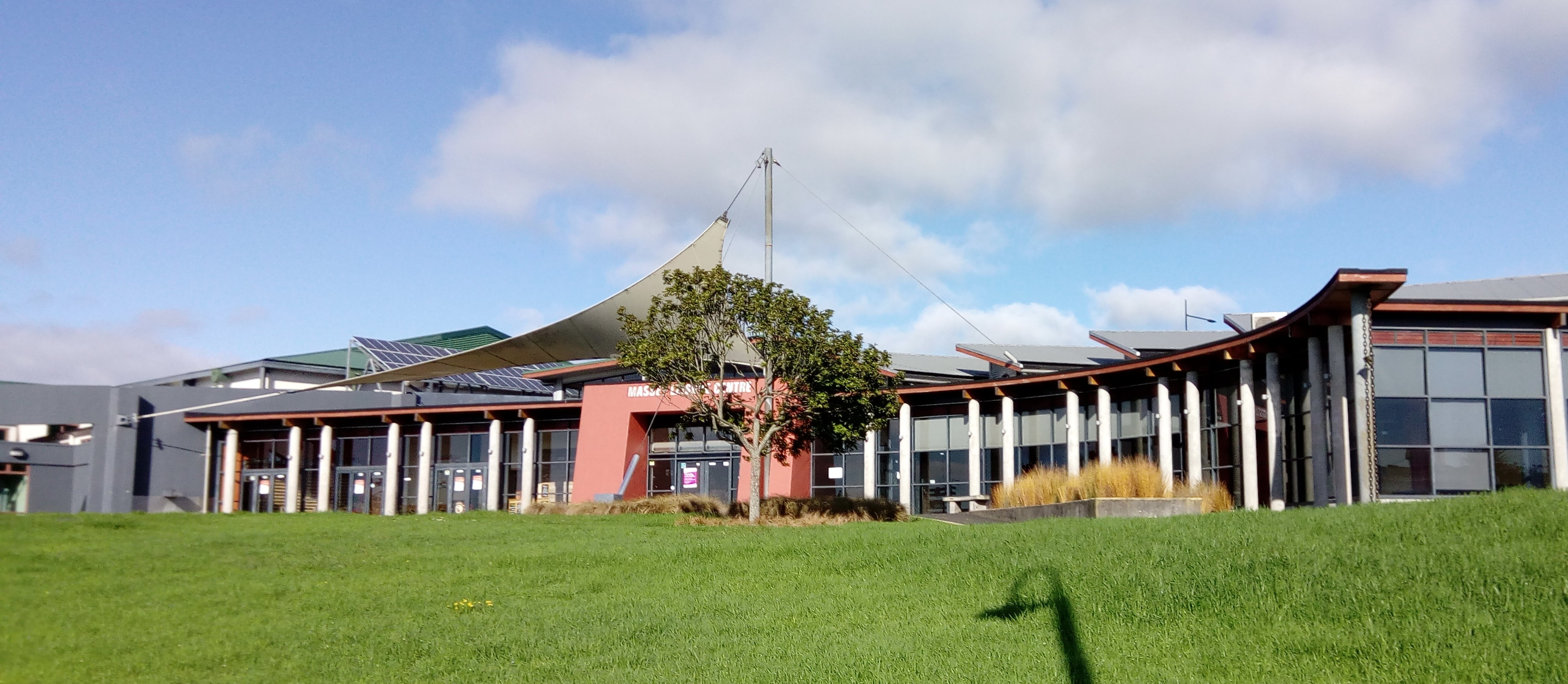
The building of the old Massey Library, now repurposed.

Te Manawa inherits the library services of Massey Library. It is a part (one of 55 branches) of the wider family of Auckland Libraries, which has extensive collections of books, e-books, newspapers, magazines and online resources, even free movie streaming. There are designated places for its fiction, non-fiction, children's and teen's collections. Te Manawa's community language collections include Chinese, Japanese, Korean and Pacific Island languages, such as Fijian, Samoan. There are PCs and a Wi-Fi connection available for library members and the public. Te Manawa has a designated study space allowing customers to sit down and study quietly.

In 2010, the then Waitakere City Council considered that the former Massey Library was unable to meet future demand created by the rapid development of the NorthWest Shopping Centre and surrounding amenities. The Council proposed the development of a new library, approximately three times larger than Massey Library, a town square and bus interchange. Massey Library was permanently closed on Thursday, 21 March 2019 shortly before the soft launch of Te Manawa.

=== Programmes and events ===
Te Manawa has a varied programme of free events and classes focused on literacy, learning, creativity and community participation. There are a number of resources available for community use including 3D printing, a sewing machine, AV Studio and commercial kitchen.

=== Council Services ===
Te Manawa provides a good range of community services. At this stage, local residents can pay their Council rates, register a dog and make general Auckland Council service inquiries under one roof and served by the same team. Te Manawa expects to further expand the council services, such as building consent submission, in the future.

=== Community venue hire ===
Te Manawa has auditoriums, meeting rooms as well as a commercial kitchen for community use with a small charge. The combined auditoriums can accommodate up to 200 people. AV Suite and Studio 2 were made available for public use since July 2020. AV Suite is fitted with audio equipment and is best suited for recording and editing purposes. Both AV Suite and Studio 2 are fitted with sound dampened walls and windows to improve sound quality.

=== Citizens Advice Bureau ===
Citizens Advice Bureau (CAB) is located on Level 2. CAB provides free, confidential, independent information and advice to all people. CAB helps the public to identify their civil rights and to get access relevant services they need. The Justice of the Peace (JP) service is a part of CAB services. JP service is available between 1:00pm and 3:00pm from Monday to Friday.
