= Sir Edmund Hillary Library =

Public library in Auckland, New Zealand

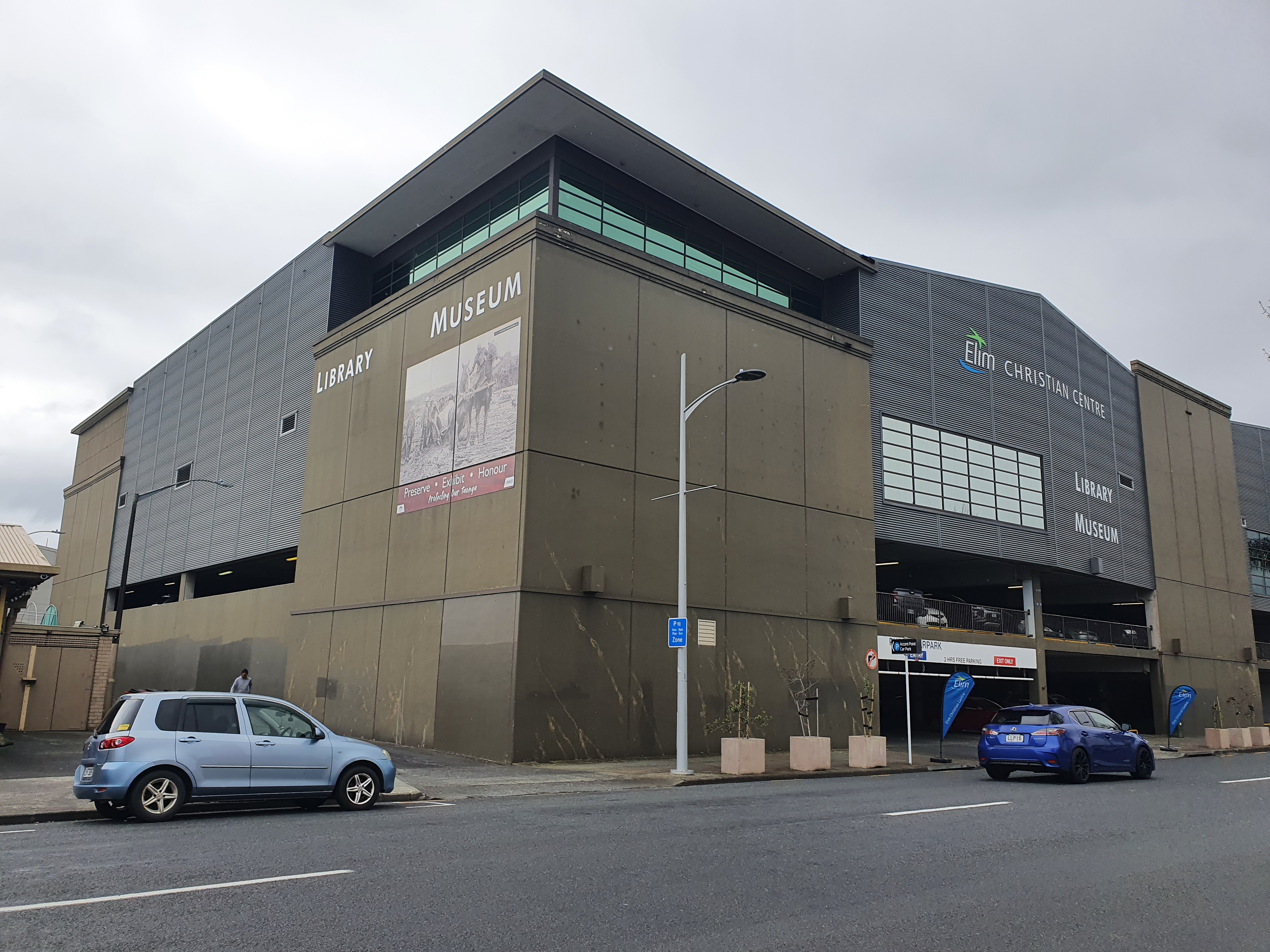
- 37°03′50″S 174°56′34″E
- Location: Papakura, Auckland, New Zealand
- Type: Public library
- Established: 1914; 112 years ago
- Branch of: Auckland Libraries

The Sir Edmund Hillary Library (also known as Papakura Library) is a library in Auckland, New Zealand.

Papakura’s first municipal library was established in 1914 when the Papakura Town Board took over a small subscription library run by the Papakura Literary Association since 1871. One of the library’s first homes was a former toll-house beside the Great South Road. Still, over the years the library service was moved several times until (by now known as the Sir Edmund Hillary Library) it finally moved into its present home in the Accent Point building in 2010.
