= Auckland Libraries =

Public library in New Zealand

Auckland Council Libraries Ngā Pātaka Kōrero o Tāmaki Makaurau (Māori)

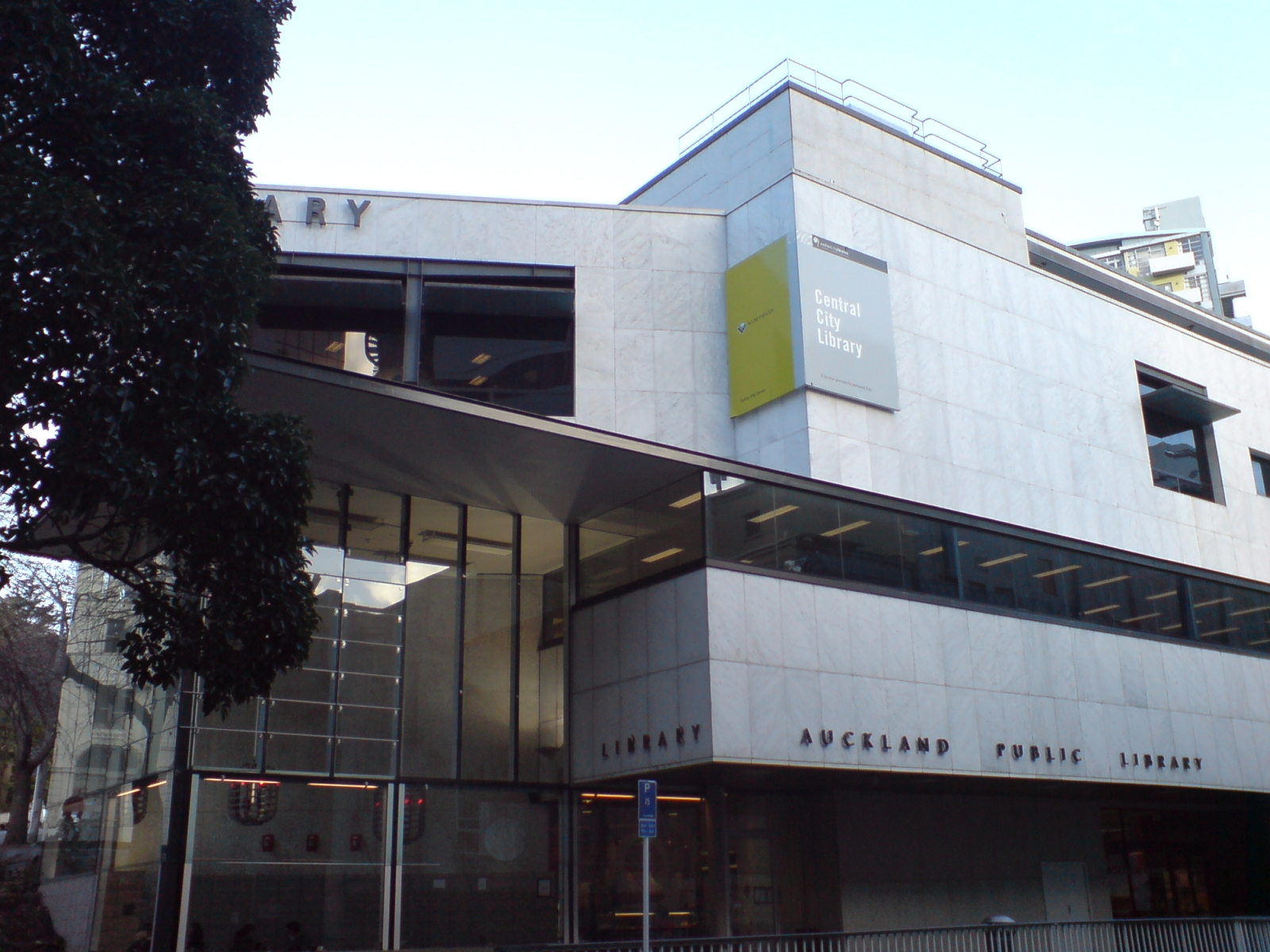
- The Central City Library in the Auckland CBD
- Location: Auckland, New Zealand
- Established: November 2010; 16 years ago
- Branches: 57 (effective from April 2026)

Collection
- Size: Approx. 3.5 million items; Access to 100+ databases

Access and use
- Circulation: 17 million items (2012)
- Population served: 1.5 million

Other information
- Director: Mirla Edmundson (General Manager Libraries and Information / Amorangi, Ngā Pātaka Kōrero)
- Website: www.aucklandlibraries.govt.nz

Auckland Council Libraries, usually simplified to Auckland Libraries, is the public library system for the Auckland Region of New Zealand. It was created when the seven separate councils in the Auckland region merged in 2010. It is currently the largest public-library network in the Southern Hemisphere, with 57 branches from Wellsford to Waiuku, two research centres, mobile library services, and an extensive heritage collection.

== History ==
In November 2010, Auckland's local councils merged to create the Auckland Council. As a result of this process, the seven public library systems within the region were combined to form Auckland Council Libraries.

The following library networks were amalgamated, forming Auckland Council Libraries:

- Auckland City Libraries
- Bookinopolis (in the Franklin District)
- Manukau City Libraries
- North Shore City Libraries
- Papakura Library Services – The Sir Edmund Hillary Library
- Rodney Libraries
- Waitakere City Libraries

=== The process of amalgamation ===
In the years leading up to the merger of the library systems within Auckland, the separate library systems combined to form a consortium in order to align their processes. This organisation was called eLGAR ("Libraries for a Greater Auckland Region"). This consortium settled on Millenium as their Library Management System, and the libraries within this system all moved to this software. The result was that the library systems were able to offer their customers a seamless transition to membership of the larger network, with immediate access to all 55 libraries from 1 November 2010 (the first day of the new council). As of May 2026, there are more than 60 libraries across Auckland region (one of which is Takaanini Library, which opened on 27 March and most recently, Flat Bush on 4 April 2026).

=== Auckland City Libraries ===
Prior to amalgamation, Auckland City Libraries was a network of 17 public libraries and a mobile library operated by Auckland City Council.

In September 1880, Auckland City Council took responsibility for the library of the Auckland Mechanics' Institute which had come under financial difficulties. The Mechanics' Institute was formed in 1842 and the items remaining in its library, along with items from the Library of the old Auckland Provincial Council (1853–1876), were included in the collection of the Auckland Free Public Library. In 1887, George Grey donated around 8,000 books, doubling the existing collection, and a new building was erected for the library on the corner of Wellesley and Coburg (now Kitchener) streets. At the time, this building housed the entire collection for the Auckland public library, in addition to the city's art collection. Additionally, from its inception in 1916 until it was closed in 1957, The Old Colonists' Museum was also in this building. This building is now the Auckland Art Gallery.

The building on Lorne Street that currently houses the Central City library was opened in 1971.

=== "Bookinopolis" ===
Before amalgamation, three public libraries – Pukekohe, Waiuku and Tuakau – made up a network known as "Bookinopolis". A municipal library had first been established at Pukekohe in 1913 and at Waiuku in 1946, in each case taking over an existing subscription library. Tuakau Public Library was opened in 1977. After local-body amalgamation in 1989, these three libraries formed the Franklin District library system. In 2000, this was taken over by the Franklin District Library Trust (from 2009 the Franklin Arts, Culture & Library Trust). The Trust renamed its library system "Bookinopolis". In 2010, the Pukekohe and Waiuku libraries became branches of Auckland Libraries, but, due to boundary changes, Tuakau was taken over by Waikato District Council.

=== Manukau Libraries ===
When Manukau City Council was formed by the amalgamation of Manukau County and Manurewa Borough in 1965, it took over responsibility for a small subscription library at Māngere East and volunteer-run community libraries in Alfriston, Beachlands, Clevedon, Kawakawa Bay, Maraetai, Orere Point, and Weymouth. The newly formed city opened its first full-service public library at Manurewa in 1967. This was followed by children's libraries at both Ōtara and Mangere East in 1969, branch libraries at Pakuranga in 1973 and Manukau City Centre in 1976, and a combined school and public library at Ngā Tapuwae College in 1978. Then came Māngere Bridge in 1979, Māngere Town Centre (which replaced Ngā Tapuwae) in 1980 and Highland Park in 1987.

Local-body amalgamation in 1989 saw two more libraries added to the system: Papatoetoe and Howick, where the municipal library services dated from 1945 and 1947 respectively. In 1958 Papatoetoe Library had earned the distinction of setting up the first municipal mobile library in New Zealand.

Manukau Libraries' last three branches were Clendon (1995), the innovative Tupu-Dawson Road Youth Library (2001), and the Botany Idealibrary (2004). Clendon Library was renamed Te Matariki Clendon when it was relocated in 2006. Throughout its life, Manukau Libraries operated as a dispersed rather than a centralised library system. However, in 2001 it also opened a reference and reading room near Manukau City Centre that later expanded into the Manukau Research Library. By 2010 Manukau Libraries operated 13 branch libraries, a research library, five volunteer-run 'rural libraries', and a mobile library.

=== North Shore Libraries ===
In 1989, the North Shore City Council was formed by combining the various boroughs that had previously existed on the North Shore, so that prior to the 2010 amalgamation of the council into the Auckland Council, North Shore Libraries was a network of six libraries and a mobile library.

=== Waitakere Libraries ===
Waitakere Libraries was part of Waitakere City Council services. Prior to the 2010 amalgamation of the Auckland Council, Waitakere Libraries consisted of Waitakere Central Library at Henderson, New Lynn War Memorial Library, Te Atatu Peninsula Library, Massey Library, Ranui Library, Glen Eden Library, and Titirangi Library.

== Collections and branches ==
Membership of Auckland Libraries is free for residents and ratepayers of the Auckland Council region. Auckland Libraries has free lending collections and a small number of rental collections (DVDs and music CDs). Library members can request an item from any of the libraries in Auckland Libraries for free. On 1 September 2021 Auckland Libraries went fines free and removed all existing overdue fines from patron records.

Many of the libraries provide Internet access. The library system also gives access to three specialised eBook suppliers: Overdrive, BorrowBox (run by Bolinda Audio), and Wheelers. There is also a Digital Library which includes over 100 databases. The library system also provides a number of free events: Wriggle and Rhyme: Active Movement for Early Learning for babies; storytime for toddlers; book clubs for teens and adults; guest speakers and author talks; movie nights; school-holiday programmes, and computer classes.

=== Branches ===
North	South	West	Central	East
Albany Village Library	Mangere Bridge Library	Avondale Library	Central City Library	Botany Library
Birkenhead Library	Mangere East Library	Blockhouse Bay Library	Epsom Library	Flat Bush Library
Devonport Library	Mangere Town Centre Library	Glen Eden Library	Glen Innes Library	Highland Park Library
East Coast Bays Library	Manukau Library	Helensville Library	Grey Lynn Library	Howick Library
Glenfield Library	Manurewa Library	Kumeu Library	Leys Institute Library Ponsonby	Pakuranga Library
Great Barrier Library	Otahuhu Library	New Lynn War Memorial Library	Mt Albert Library	Panmure Library
Mahurangi East Library	Otara Library	Pt Chevalier Library	Mt Roskill Library	
Northcote Library	Papatoetoe Library	Ranui Library	Onehunga Library	
Orewa Library	Pukekohe Library	Te Atatu Peninsula Library	Parnell Library	
Takapuna Library	Sir Edmund Hillary Library (Papakura)	Te Manawa (Westgate)	Remuera Library	
Warkworth Library	Takaanini Library	Titirangi Library	St Heliers Library	
Wellsford War Memorial Library	Te Matariki Clendon Library	Waitakere Central Library (Henderson)	Waiheke Island Library	
Whangaparaoa Library	Tupu Library	Waiuku Library		

== Heritage collections and Research Centres ==
Auckland Libraries has an online database recording its heritage collections holdings. The online database is named Kura Heritage Collections Online and includes photographs, maps, manuscripts, journals, indexes and oral histories.

=== Research Centres ===
In addition to the lending and rental collections Auckland Libraries also holds a number of heritage and research collections. These are primarily held in the four regional Research Centres and the Auckland Libraries Heritage Collections including Sir George Grey Special Collections. The North and West Auckland Research Centres closed desk service on 30 September 2023, making in-person services available by appointment only.

The North Auckland Research Centre is home to heritage collections such as the Angela Morton Art History Collection and the letters of Major Donald Stott. The Angela Morton Collection is a reference collection of publications which relate to the visual art and artists of New Zealand.

The Central Auckland Research Centre holds microfilms of Auckland heritage newspapers, copies of Auckland area local newspapers and the Auckland Star Clippings collection as well as a comprehensive collection of Māori, Family History and Local History published material.

The South Auckland Research Centre, based at Manukau City Centre, specialises in the history of the southern and eastern parts of Auckland city (Howick, Manukau, Manurewa-Papakura and Franklin wards), but also has strong general reference, family history, Māori and New Zealand collections. The heritage collections include a wide range of books and periodicals, newspapers, photographs, maps, oral history recordings, ephemera, and manuscripts and archives.

Further south, Pukekohe Library also holds substantial heritage collections of books, photographs, periodicals and newspapers relating to the Franklin area. South Auckland Research Centre staff work closely with local historical societies and museums in the area which have heritage collections.

The West Auckland Research Centre moved into the former Waitākere Central Library Reference Room in April 2013. The Local History collections includes collections of John Thomas (Jack) Diamond, who researched and collected material on the history and industries of the West Auckland region. His personal papers and research library were donated to the library in 2001. The collection contains material on Maori and the archaeology of the Waitākere Ranges and the brick, pottery and timber industries. It also includes approximately 10,000 photographs, both prints and negatives. The collection also includes published and unpublished material on the heritage of West Auckland, and includes books, magazines, newspapers, research files, ephemera, photographs, personal papers, community archives and over 200 oral histories. Images, audio, collection records and indexes held in Auckland Libraries' Heritage and Research collections are available online at Kura Heritage Collections Online.

=== Heritage Collections ===
Auckland Council Libraries' Heritage Collections (formerly Sir George Grey Special Collections: Tā Hori Kerei – Ngā kohinga taonga whakahirahira) is one of the largest documentary heritage collections in the southern hemisphere. Since the founding gift to the citizens of Auckland by George Grey in 1887, the collections have grown by purchase and generous donations by numerous benefactors to become one of the country's major heritage collections.

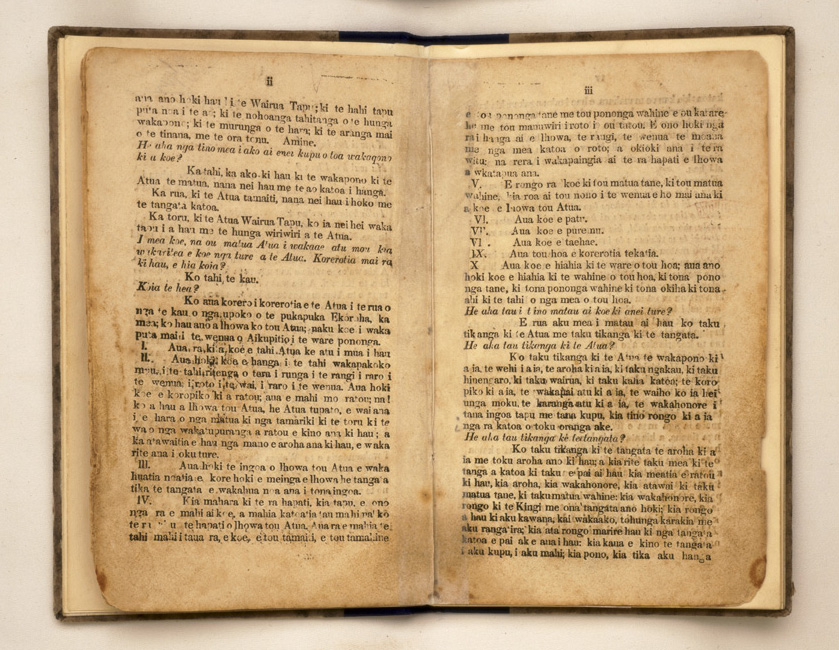
Ko te Katihama III (1830), the first work printed in New Zealand, is held at Auckland Libraries.

Significant holdings include items of documentary heritage that are part of the UNESCO Memory of the World, New Zealand register, which currently include:

- George Grey's New Zealand Māori Manuscript Collection, added to the register in 2011.
- The original score and lyrics for the New Zealand national anthem, "God Defend New Zealand", added to the register in 2013.
- The personal papers of John A. Lee, added to the register in 2017.
- J. T. Diamond West Auckland history collection, added to the register in 2017.
- The C. P. Dawes Collection, added to the register in 2019.
- Richard Davis's meteorological records spanning 1839–1851, added to the register in 2019.
- The James Reddy Clendon papers, added to the register in 2022 and held at both Auckland Libraries and the Heritage New Zealand-owned Clendon House in Rawene.
- The Henry Winkelmann photographic collection, added to the register in 2023 and held at both Auckland Libraries and Auckland War Memorial Museum. The Old Colonists' Museum purchased a large collection of Winkelmann's Auckland images from the photographer himself in 1928. These were transferred to the library after the museum's closure in 1957.

Other items of note include the first work printed in New Zealand: Ko te katihama III (pictured), printed in 1830 by William Yate who worked for the Church Missionary Society; the manuscript of Robin Hyde's unpublished autobiography and of Baron de Thierry's Historical narrative of an attempt to form a settlement in New Zealand; a certified copy written in Māori of the Treaty of Waitangi, and documents concerning the building of the Stone Store at Kerikeri, New Zealand's oldest surviving stone building.

Archival collections that have been deposited include the personal papers of Jane Mander, as well as the records of Mercury Theatre and the Auckland branch of Greenpeace Aotearoa New Zealand. On his retirement in 1974, Clifton Firth gave Auckland Libraries much of his surviving work, including many display prints as well as more than 100 000 photographic negatives.

Notable international rare books include a copy of Shakespeare's First Folio (1623), Spenser's The Faerie Queene (1590); an edition of William Blake's Europe a Prophecy and America a Prophecy bound together, and Alexander Shaw's A catalogue of the different specimens of cloth collected in the three voyages of Captain Cook (known as "the tapa-cloth book"). The Reed Dumas collection resides in Sir George Grey Special Collections. From boyhood an avid admirer of French author Alexandre Dumas, Whangārei pharmacist Frank Reed (1854–1953) gradually accumulated the most extensive Dumas collection outside France, and bequeathed the more than 4,000 items to Auckland Public Library. It includes 500 first editions in French and English, 2,000 sheets of original manuscripts, and 51 typescript volumes of translations, letters and bibliographies.
