= Rowena Cullen =

New Zealand information scientist

- Born: Rowena Joy Knight; 1946 (age 79–80)
- Spouse: Michael Cullen (m. 1967; div. 1989)
- Awards: Fellow of the Library and Information Association of New Zealand Aotearoa

Academic background
- Education: Victoria University of Wellington
- Thesis: Assessing the Effectiveness of Information Services: an Evaluative Model (2001)

Academic work
- Discipline: Information services
- Institutions: Victoria University of Wellington

Rowena Joy Cullen (née Knight; born 1946) is a New Zealand information services academic, and is professor emerita at the Victoria University of Wellington. She has published on e-government in the Pacific and health information on the internet.

== Academic career ==
Born in 1946, Cullen was educated at Christchurch Girls' High School, and went on to study at the University of Canterbury where she completed a Master of Arts degree in English in 1968. In 1968, she was awarded the Tytheridge travelling scholarship in arts. She then completed a Master of Letters at the University of Edinburgh, returning to New Zealand to complete a Master of Arts in librarianship and a PhD at Victoria University of Wellington (VUW). Cullen then joined the faculty of the School of Government at Victoria University of Wellington, rising to full professor.

Cullen was appointed emeritus professor of the university on her retirement. She is or has been on the editorial board of a number of journals, including as an associate editor for the Library and Information Science Research Electronic Journal (LIBRES), and the Journal of Information Technology & Politics. Cullen co-chaired a session on "The Foundations of Innovation in Government Must Rest on Sound Policies, Governance Principles, Ethics, and Laws" at the 44th Hawaiian International Conference on System Sciences.

Cullen has written or edited several books on e-government, and health information on the internet.

== Honours and awards ==
Cullen was elected a Fellow of LIANZA in 2007, and in 2012 was made an honorary life member. In 2008, she received a VUW award for research excellence.

== Personal life ==
Cullen's parents were John and Molly Knight. In 1967, she married Michael Cullen who would later become a member of parliament. The couple had two daughters. They separated in 1987 and divorced in 1989.

== Selected works ==
=== Books ===
- Hernon, Peter; Cullen, Rowena; Relyea, Harold C., eds. (March 2006). Comparative perspectives on e-government: serving today and building for tomorrow. Scarecrow Press. ISBN 978-0-8108-5357-7.
- Cullen, Rowena (2006). Health information on the Internet: a study of providers, quality, and users. Westport, Conn.: Praeger.
- Cullen, Rowena; Hassall, Graham, eds. (2017), "E-Government in Pacific Island Countries", Achieving Sustainable E-Government in Pacific Island States, Public Administration and Information Technology, vol. 27, Cham: Springer International Publishing, pp. 3–32, doi:10.1007/978-3-319-50972-3_1, ISBN 978-3-319-50970-9

=== Journal ===
- Cullen, Rowena Joy (2001). "Addressing the digital divide". Online Information Review. 25 (5): 311–320. doi:10.1108/14684520110410517. Wikidata Q128811962.
- Cullen, Rowena Joy (2002). "In search of evidence: family practitioners' use of the Internet for clinical information". Journal of the Medical Library Association. 90 (4): 370–379. PMC 128953. PMID 12398243. Wikidata Q34148527.
- Cullen, Rowena Joy; Chawner, Brenda (2011). "Institutional Repositories, Open Access, and Scholarly Communication: A Study of Conflicting Paradigms". The Journal of Academic Librarianship. 37 (6): 460–470. doi:10.1016/j.acalib.2011.07.002. Wikidata Q56765670.
- Cullen, Rowena Joy; Clark, Megan; Esson, Rachel (2011). "Evidence-based information-seeking skills of junior doctors entering the workforce: an evaluation of the impact of information literacy training during pre-clinical years". Health Information and Libraries Journal. 28 (2): 119–129. doi:10.1111/j.1471-1842.2011.00933.x. PMID 21564495. Wikidata Q50629235.
- Cullen, Rowena Joy; Caroline Houghton (2000). "Democracy online: an assessment of New Zealand government web sites". Government Information Quarterly. 17 (3): 243–267. doi:10.1016/s0740-624x(00)00033-2. Wikidata Q128811875.
- Cullen, Rowena Joy; Clark, Megan; Esson, Rachel (2011). "Evidence-based information-seeking skills of junior doctors entering the workforce: an evaluation of the impact of information literacy training during pre-clinical years". Health Information and Libraries Journal. 28 (2): 119–129. doi:10.1111/j.1471-1842.2011.00933.x. PMID 21564495. Wikidata Q50629235.
- Cullen, Rowena Joy; Chawner, Brenda (2010). "Institutional repositories: assessing their value to the academic community". Performance Measurement and Metrics. 11 (2): 131–147. doi:10.1108/14678041011064052. Wikidata Q128811956.
- Cullen, Rowena; Hassall, Graham (January 2013). "An Information Ecology Approach to Sustainable E-Government among Small Island Developing States in the Pacific". 2013 46th Hawaii International Conference on System Sciences. Vol. 1. IEEE. pp. 1922–1931. doi:10.1109/hicss.2013.86. ISBN 978-1-4673-5933-7.
