= Copsey =

Copsey is a surname. Notable people with the surname include:

- Alf Copsey (1921–1996), Australian rules footballer
- Janet Copsey, New Zealand librarian
- Katherine Copsey, Australian politician
- Sue Copsey (born 1960), New Zealand writer and editor
- Tony Copsey (born 1965), English rugby player
