= Rachel Esson =

New Zealand librarian

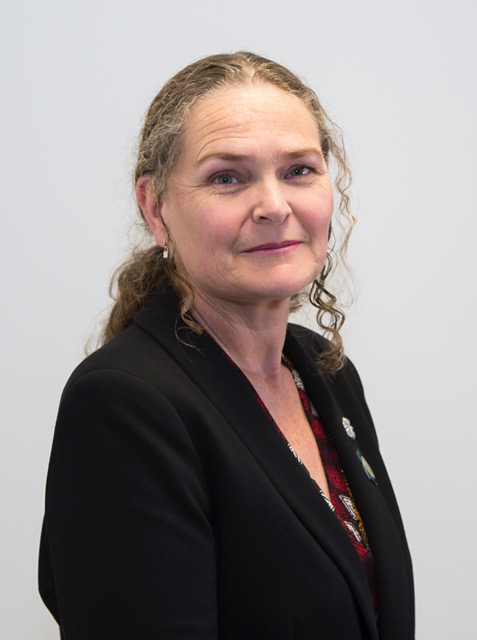
- Esson in 2020

9th National librarian of New Zealand
- Incumbent
- Assumed office 17 December 2020
- Preceded by: Bill Macnaught

Personal details
- Born: 1965 (age 60–61) Palmerston North, New Zealand
- Education: Victoria University of Wellington; University of Otago
- Profession: Librarian

Rachel Margaret Esson (born 1965) is the National Librarian Te Pouhuaki of New Zealand. Before moving into that role in 2020, she served in several positions at the Victoria University of Wellington library and the National Library of New Zealand, including Director of Content Services. Esson also served as the president of LIANZA, New Zealand's national library association, from 2019 to 2020.

== Early life and education ==
Esson was born in 1965 in Palmerston North. She spent much of her childhood in Palmerston North, where her father was a scientist studying cicadas at nearby research stations.

Esson studied to become a physiotherapist as well as an economist before finding her place in librarianship. She attended library school at the Victoria University of Wellington and earned a Master of Library and Information Science degree in 2009, with a thesis on survey design in medical libraries. She also has a Certificate in Tertiary Teaching from the University of Otago.

== Career ==
Esson began her library career in 1986 as a library assistant in the photographic archive at the National Library of New Zealand's Alexander Turnbull Library.

Between 2008 and 2012, she worked at the library of the Victoria University of Wellington; her titles there included Head of Research and Learning Services as well as Associate Director Library Academic Services.

In 2013, she returned to the Alexander Turnbull Library, taking on a role as the Assistant Chief Librarian Research Collections. She became the Director of Content Services for the National Library of New Zealand in October 2016. She was the 2019–2020 president of LIANZA, the Library and Information Association of New Zealand Aotearoa.

On 17 December 2020, Esson became New Zealand's National Librarian, following the retirement of Bill Macnaught. In her role as the National Librarian, she holds the Māori title Te Pouhuaki.
