= Carnaby =

Carnaby is a family name which may refer to:

== People ==
- Garth Carnaby (born 1950) New Zealand fibre physicist and science and public administrator
- Ivan Carnaby (1908–1974), Australian ornithologist
- Penny Carnaby, New Zealand librarian
- Tom Carnaby (1913–1971), British footballer
- William Carnaby (1595–1645), English politician
- William Carnaby (composer) (1772–1839), English organist and composer

== Places ==
- Carnaby Street, London, England
- Carnaby, East Riding of Yorkshire, a village in England
  - Carnaby railway station
- RAF Carnaby, East Riding of Yorkshire, England
