= Bronwyn Labrum =

New Zealand cultural historian and author

Bronwyn Labrum is a New Zealand cultural historian and author.

Labrum was born and raised in Whanganui, and attended Whanganui High School. She received a BA Hons and M.A. in history at Massey University, and was deputy editor of the student magazine Chaff. She graduated with a PhD from Victoria University of Wellington in 2000.

Labrum worked as curator of history and textiles at the Museum of New Zealand Te Papa Tongarewa in Wellington, and was an associate professor in the School of Design at Massey University as well as teaching history at the University of Waikato. From 2016 she was the head of New Zealand and Pacific Cultures at Te Papa. She then joined Canterbury Museum to lead special projects. In December 2020 she was appointed Director of the Whanganui Regional Museum, to start in February 2021. In December 2025, she announced her resignation from the Whanganui Regional Museum with effect from 16th January 2026.

Labrum's 2015 book Real Modern: Everyday New Zealand in the 1950s and 1960s was shortlisted for the 2016 Ockham New Zealand Book Awards.

== Published works ==
- Women’s History: Researching and Writing Women’s History in New Zealand (BWB, 1993)
- Looking Flash: Clothing in Aotearoa New Zealand (AUP, 2007)
- Real Modern: Everyday New Zealand in the 1950s and 1960s (Te Papa Press, 2015).
- Women Now: the Legacy of Female Suffrage (Te Papa Press, 2018).
- Fragments: New Zealand Social and Cultural History (Auckland University Press, 2000).
