= Whanganui Regional Museum =

Museum in Whanganui, New Zealand

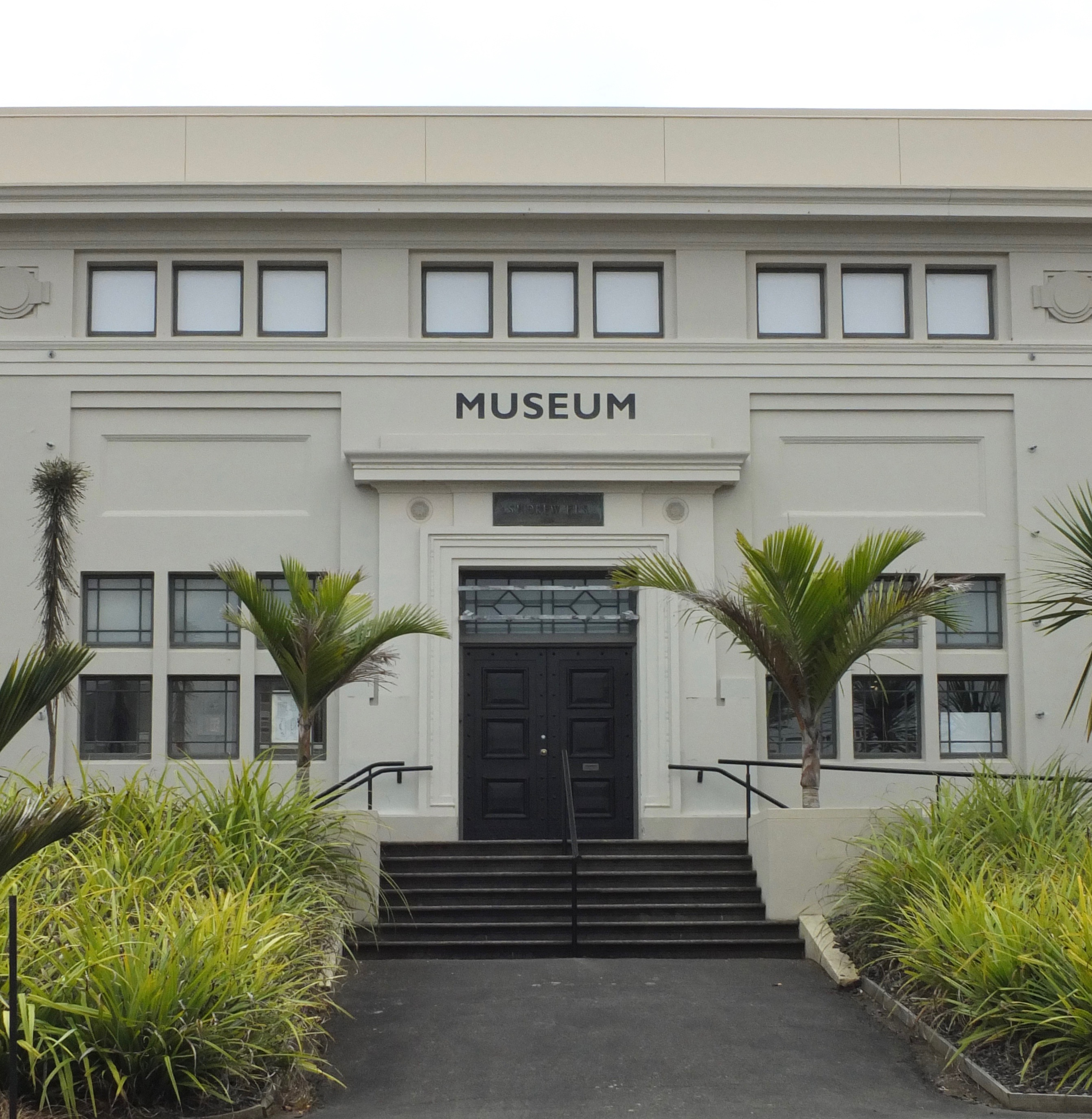
- Former name: Wanganui Public Museum, Alexander Museum
- Established: 1895
- Location: Whanganui, New Zealand
- Coordinates: 39.9317°S 175.0519°E
- Collections: Natural history, taonga Māori, history
- Collection size: 300,000
- Founder: Samuel Henry Drew
- Website: www.wrm.org.nz

The Whanganui Regional Museum in Whanganui, New Zealand, has an extensive collection of natural and human-history objects. The emphasis is on items from the Whanganui region, but the collection also includes objects of national and international significance, such as Pacific tapa, ceramics from Asia and Cyprus, and moa bones from nearby Makirikiri Swamp.

== History ==
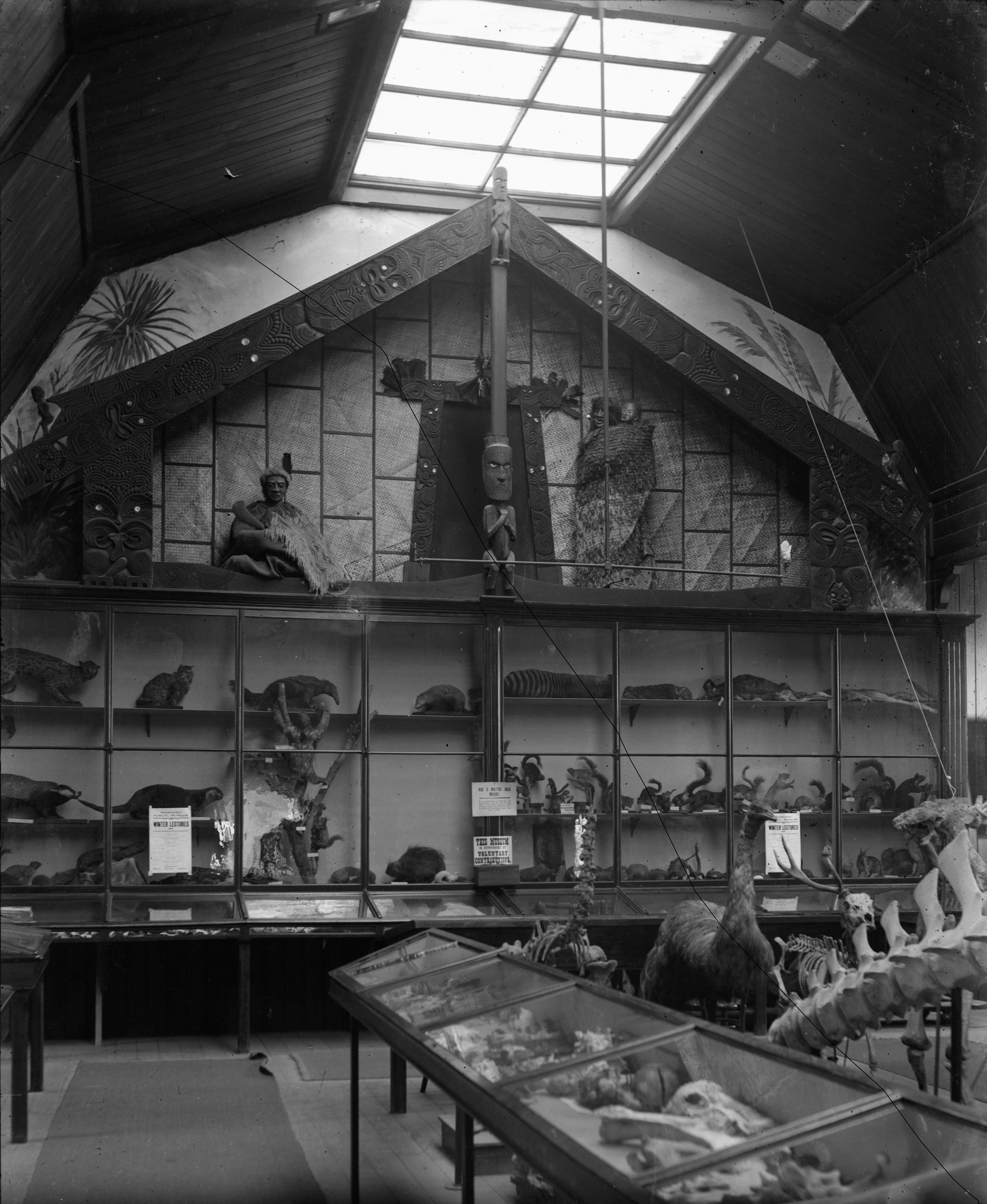
Interior of the Wanganui Public Museum circa 1920

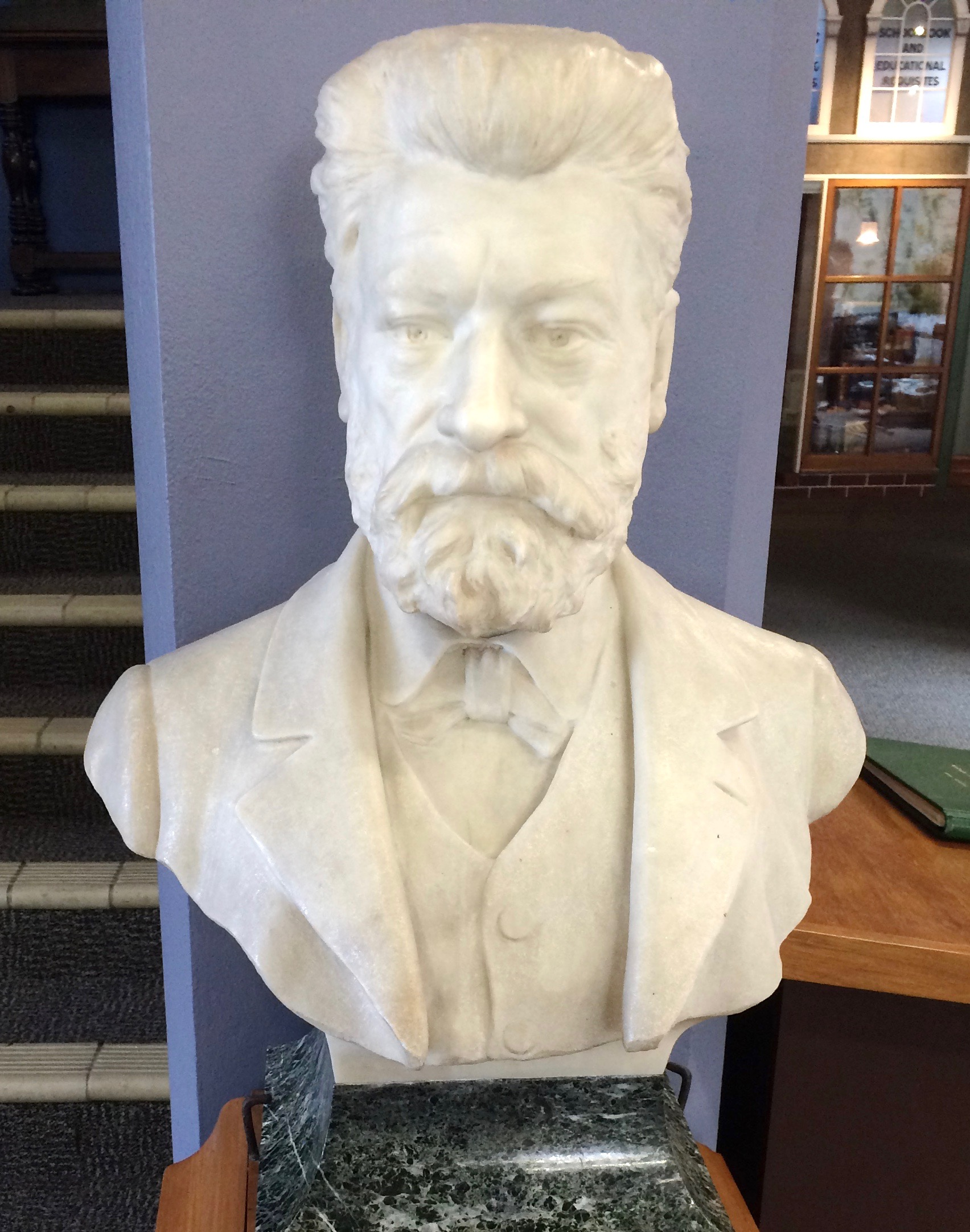
The museum's founder, Samuel Drew

Local naturalist and jeweller Samuel Henry Drew was instrumental in establishing the museum; his private collection was sold to the town, and he was honorary curator when the then-Wanganui Public Museum opened on 24 March 1895. The original building was on the site of the present Savage Club Hall.

=== Alexander Museum ===
A new building on Watt Street near Queen's Park was constructed in 1928. Designed by architect Robert Talboys, the building had two stories and a basement. The museum was renamed the 'Alexander Museum', after Henry Alexander as the new build was funded with monies from his estate.

The move to the new museum brought about a change in exhibit. Previously stored collections were displayed, such as the McLachlan collection of coins. A newspaper article at the time reported that the collection of British coins was the largest in the Southern Hemisphere and included coins from the Roman period right up to the 1920s. It had been collected over 150 years by three generations of the McLachlan family. Other previously displayed exhibits, like the three metre tall moa skeleton, were moved into storage.

In 1932, two escaped prisoners hid in the museum, posing as visitors. Their unkempt appearance and lack of interest in the displays, however, aroused suspicion in the director, J. Burnet, who then identified one of the men from a newspaper photograph.

=== Later developments ===
A bequest from the Davis Trust funded the rear extension in 1968, which included a Māori Court, Davis Lecture Theatre, classroom, and a 2,000m^{2} multi-storied car park. In 1997, the carpark was converted into storage facilities for the museum and Wanganui District Council's archive department.

In September 2016 the museum was closed to the public for earthquake strengthening, reconstruction and refurbishment, with exhibitions continuing at the old Post Office building at 62 Ridgway Street. The $2.6 million project was initially scheduled to take 18 months, but the reopening date was subsequently pushed forward to October 2018 and January 2019; it reopened in March 2019.

=== Collections ===
==== Moa ====
The museum has an internationally notable collection of moa bones, as many were found in the local area and not traded or dispersed as happened in other localities. The moa collection was documented and analysed in 1989 by palaeontologist Trevor Worthy, who was able to group the bones statistically into age and species classes.

At the end of the 1890s, J. Burnet found a headless moa skeleton in Wanganui East, which was acquired by the museum and assembled by R. Murdoch. Twenty years later, a skull was acquired that fit the skeleton. In 1933, a large collection of bones were discovered at Makirikiri. Five years later the museum, with a £1200 excavation budget, launched an excavation using a crane, bucket and sluice. About two thousand moa bones were found by hand-sorting through hundreds of cubic yards of mud. Curator George Shepherd assembled ten skeletons from the bones and these were put on display. As the museum's Curator of Natural History noted:

The Whanganui collection is one of the most important in the world because it has stayed almost completely intact, which lets scientists study an entire community of moa trapped in the swamp over thousands of years: their age, growth rate, size and male/female ratio.

The museum also holds a complete and intact moa egg, found in 1931 by workmen excavating a cliff at Waitotara. It is one of the few intact and complete moa eggs known in the world.

==== Māori taonga ====
Part of the Māori collection was donated by Dr and Mrs Wall in 1933, as a memorial for their son John Barnicoat Wall. John had died in a mountaineering accident and, to mark his interest in the museum, the Walls purchased the late Dr. A.K. Newman's collection of Māori artifacts and donated it to the museum.

==== William James Harding Collection ====
The William Harding photographic collection is a historic archive of more than 6,500 photographs, documenting Whanganui society from the 1850s to the 1880s. The collection is held at the Alexander Turnbull Library and Whanganui Regional Museum, and in 2024 was inscribed on the UNESCO Memory of the World Aotearoa New Zealand Ngā Mahara o te Ao register.

=== Directors ===
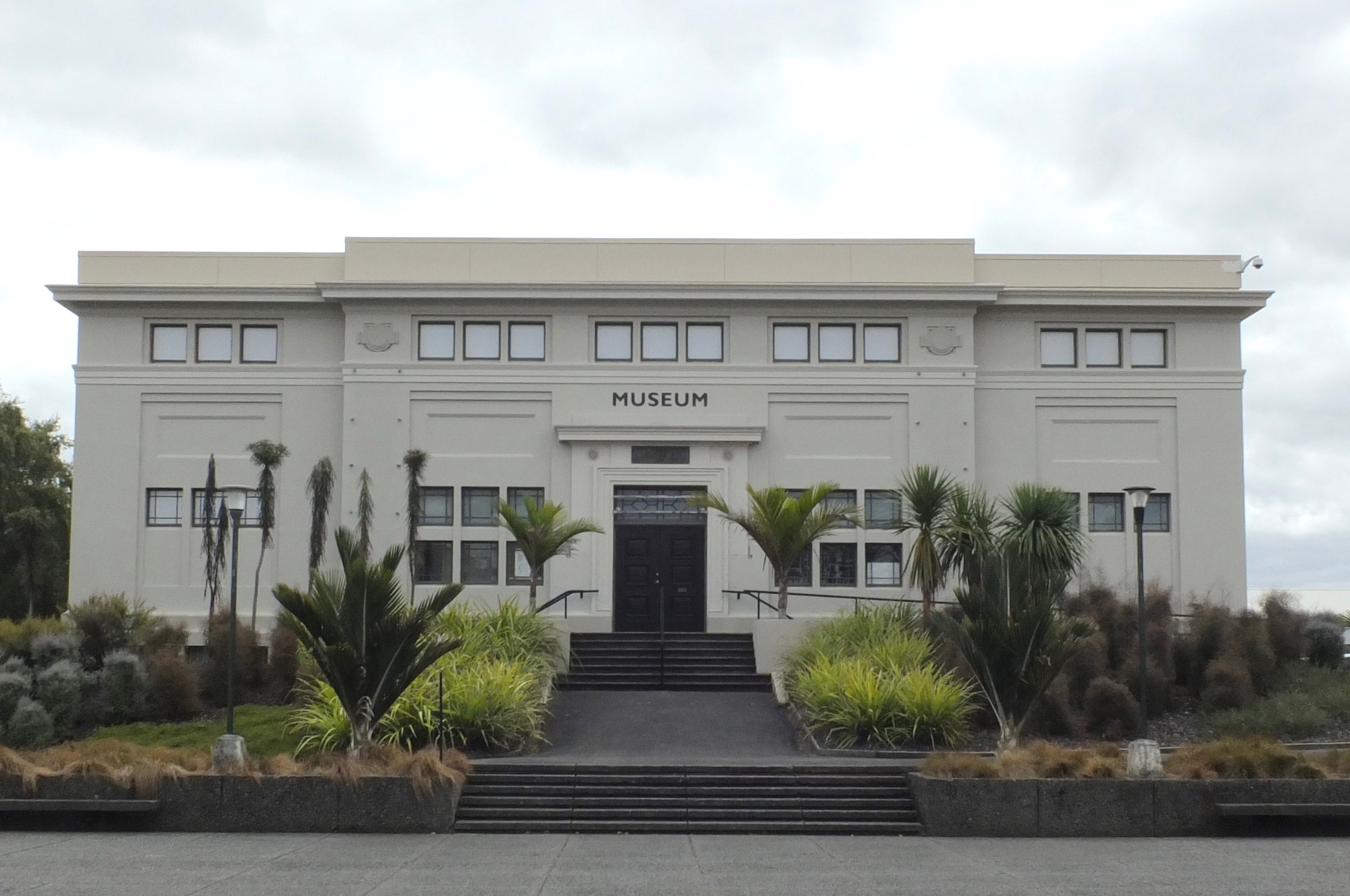
The 1928 Alexander Museum building, front of the current museum

- Samuel H. Drew (1892–1901)
- J.H. Burnet (1930–1938)
- Max Smart (1951–1960)
- Donald Cimino (1973–1982)
- Brian Henderson (1982–1994)
- Sharon Dell (1995–2008)
- Wallis Barnicoat (2009–2010)
- Eric Dorfman (2011–2015)
- Frank Stark (2016–2019)
- Bronwyn Labrum (2021–2026)
