= National Library of New Zealand =

Legal-deposit national library

- Te Puna Mātauranga o Aotearoa

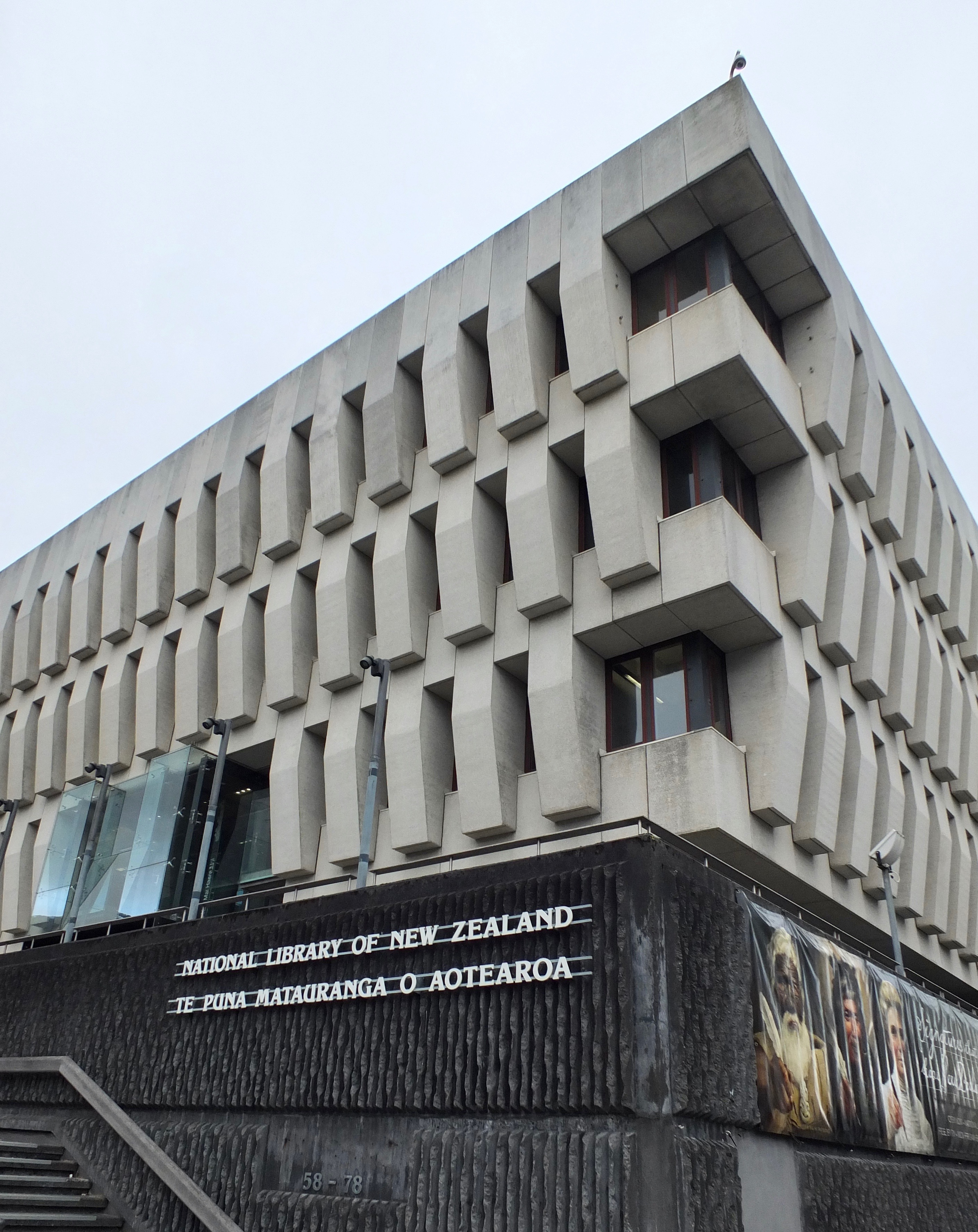
- Headquarters in Wellington
- 41.276614°S 174.778372°E
- Location: Molesworth Street, Thorndon, Wellington, New Zealand
- Established: 1965
- Branch of: Department of Internal Affairs

Collection
- Size: 1,515,172 in General Collections; 5,333,500 in Alexander Turnbull Library

Other information
- Budget: NZ$31,850,000 (2006)
- Director: Rachel Esson (Te Pouhuaki National Librarian)
- Website: natlib.govt.nz

The National Library of New Zealand (Māori: Te Puna Mātauranga o Aotearoa) is New Zealand's national library, headquartered in Wellington on the corner of Aitken and Molesworth Streets, close to other national government buildings such as the New Zealand Parliament Buildings and the Court of Appeal. Under the National Library of New Zealand (Te Puna Mātauranga) Act 2003, the library's purpose is to "enrich the cultural and economic life of New Zealand and its interchanges with other nations." The Act also enumerates other duties for the library, including collecting, preserving and protecting New Zealand's documentary heritage, supporting other libraries in New Zealand, and collaborating with peer institutions abroad.

The National Library is New Zealand's legal deposit library, and the Legal Deposit Office is the country's agency for ISBN and ISSN. The library supports schools through its Services to Schools business unit, which has curriculum and advisory branches around New Zealand.

== History ==
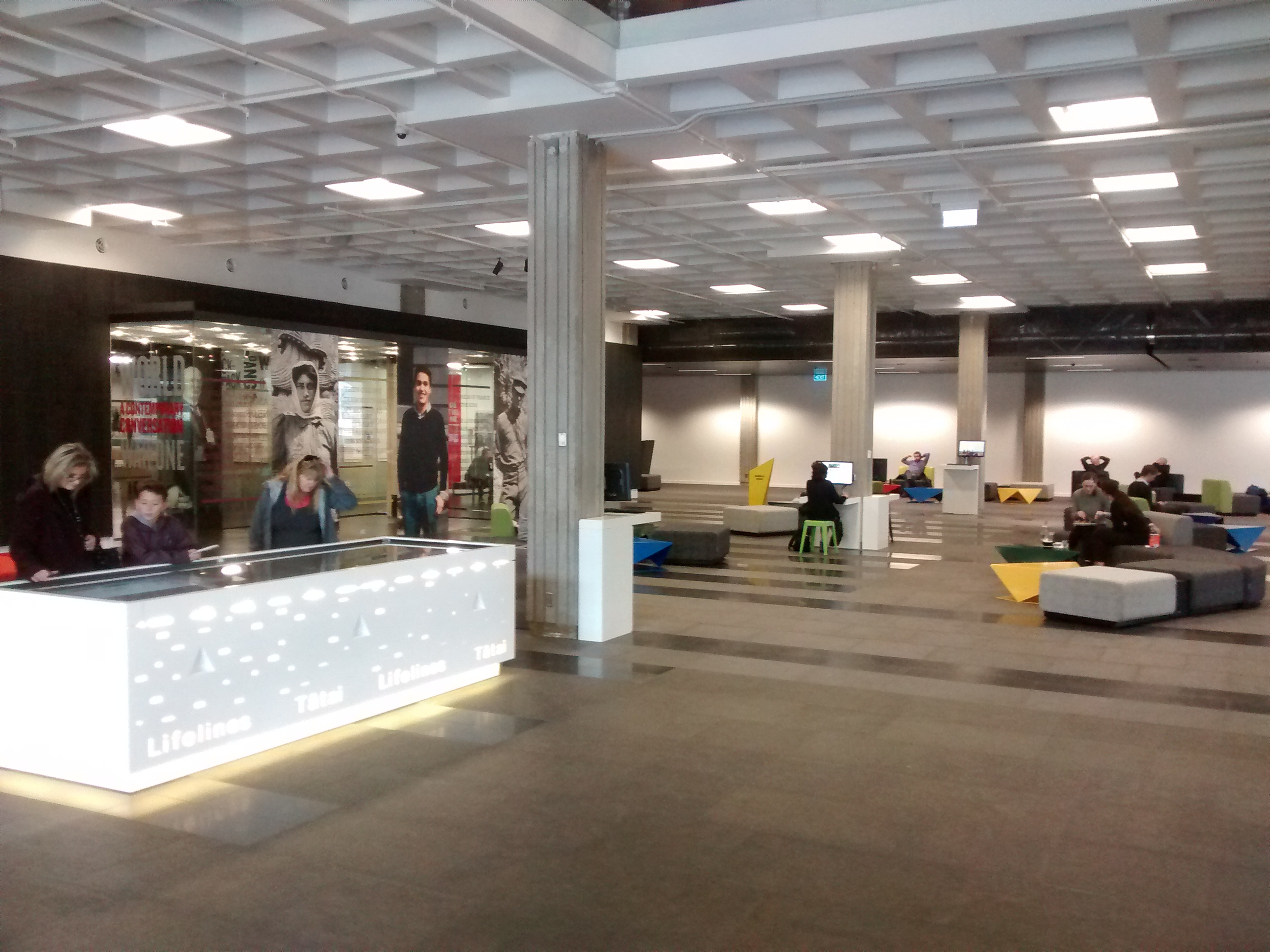
The lobby of National Library Wellington

=== Origins ===
The National Library of New Zealand was formed in 1965 when the General Assembly Library, the Alexander Turnbull Library, and the National Library Service were brought together by the National Library Act 1965.

The National Library of New Zealand originated from money funds appropriated by Parliament in 1856. It developed into a major national institution, described as "a magnificent national treasure house in a splendid building." From its establishment, until its formal designation as the National Library, it combined parliamentary information services, including collections of documents and newspapers, with an extensive library of international research and literature.

The Alexander Turnbull Library was founded in 1920 and grew to hold a "comprehensive collection" of primarily New Zealand culture and history, Māori and non-Māori. The National Library Service, established in 1945, was made up of four divisions: the Country Library Service, the School Library Service, a National Library centre and Library School in Wellington.

=== Consolidation ===
In 1974, the Archive of New Zealand Music was established at the suggestion of New Zealand composer Douglas Lilburn.

In 1976 Mary Ronnie became the first female national librarian in the world, due to becoming New Zealand's first female National Librarian, at the National Library of New Zealand.

In 1985, the General Assembly Library returned to become part of the Parliamentary Service, changing its name in 1987 to the Parliamentary Library. When it separated from the National Library, the National Library then took guardianship of hundreds of thousands of international volumes previously acquired by the General Assembly Library, and the National Library continued to curate the traditional international library.

In 1987, staff and collections from 14 different sites around Wellington were centralised in a new National Library building, officially opened in August. The architecture of the building is said to have been heavily influenced by the design of the Boston City Hall.

In 1988, the National Library became an autonomous government department where previously it had been administered by the Department of Education. The same year, the Library took on the te reo Māori name Te Puna Mātauranga o Aotearoa, which translated means: the wellspring of knowledge, of New Zealand.

=== Restructuring and renovations ===
In early 1998 an ambitious $8.5 million computer project was scrapped.

The National Library building was to be expanded and upgraded in 2009–2011, but the incoming Fifth National Government greatly scaled down the scope of the work, reducing the budget for it and delaying the commencement, arguing concerns about the cost of the project and the reduction in the accessibility of collections and facilities during the construction work. The building closed for two years, reopening in June 2012, while refurbishment continued.

On 25 March 2010 the Minister of State Services announced that Archives New Zealand and the National Library of New Zealand would be subsumed under the Department of Internal Affairs.

In June 2018 a National Archival and Library Institutions Ministerial Group (NALI) was announced. The purpose of NALI was to examine the structure and role of the National Library, Archives New Zealand and Ngā Taonga Sound & Vision, the position of the Chief Archivist and National Librarian, and the future of collecting, preserving and providing access to New Zealand's documentary heritage, particularly digital preservation and access. Before and since NALI was set up concern has been expressed about the National Library being part of the Department of Internal Affairs.

Though the Department of Internal Affairs had initially planned to move the National library along with Archives New Zealand and Ngā Taonga Sound & Vision to a new purpose-built facility at the Horowhenua Business Park in Levin, the project was not fully funded in later Budget bids and eventually cancelled by April 2024.

In February 2022 Internal Affairs Minister Jan Tinetti, Archives NZ chief archivist Stephen Clarke and Māori iwi (tribe) Taranaki Whānui Te Āti Awa confirmed that the Government would build a new archives building on the site of the former Defence House on Wellington's Aitken Street between the present Archives NZ and National Library buildings. The new NZ$290 million building will also host archives repository and specialist facilities for the National Library, Archives New Zealand and Ngā Taonga Sound & Vision.

In October 2026, the National Library and Archives New Zealand confirmed plans to lay off 45 jobs, amounting to 11 percent of their workforce.

=== Overseas published collections review ===
In 2015, the National Library signalled the beginning of a review process of their international collections, comprising the General Assembly international library in its guardianship of General Assembly collections and substantial post-1965 acquisitions. The National Library classified these collections as "overseas published collections". This was done in consultation with New Zealand's library sector. The review process was publicly announced in December 2019.

Under the aegis of the Department of Internal Affairs, operations began in 2018 to dispense with 625,000 "overseas published" books, out of a total of overseas published collections amounting to 710,000 items.

In October 2019, the library announced its intention to offer the books to local libraries, prison libraries, and community groups. The library stated the weeding was being done to create "room to continue to grow our Māori, Pacific and New Zealand collections and to build well-managed coherent collections that support the National Library's functions, in line with our legislated mandate and collections policy."

In September 2020, the review and weeding of overseas published book collections began to be discussed in the New Zealand media. The review attracted both positive and negative international and local media coverage.

The review revealed that some of the books may be of pertinence to New Zealand/Aotearoan history and on-going narratives. Concerned that researchers would lose access, the weeding of over 600,000 books was challenged by the advocacy group Book Guardians Aotearoa. The books in question are housed in Wellington and Whanganui. In July 2021 the Library announced it had made a donation agreement with the Internet Archive to take the books and digitise them, making them available to researchers on their Open Library platform.

In September 2021, the Publishers Association of New Zealand and the New Zealand Society of Authors lodged an appeal against the legality of the National Library's donation to Internet Archive with the attorney-general, arguing that the donation breached copyright law and expressing concern about the future of the books should the archive be ordered to close. In October 2021, British novelist Philip Pullman, the President of the British Society of Authors, criticised the donation for allegedly breaching copyright laws. Wellington QC Hugh Rennie also alleged that the National Library was receiving advice from a lawyer unauthorised to practise in New Zealand, in response to Tohatoha copyright adviser Michael Wolfe's statement in support of the donation agreement. The lawyers Andrew Brown QC and Jack Oliver-Hood also opined that the deal made the library liable for copyright infringement in New Zealand courts.

The Library states that the Internet Archive uses controlled digital lending to "prevent illicit copying and ensure that copies are loaned to one person at a time" and that "controlled digital lending provides a way to ensure protection for content creators as well as the ability for people to be able to access and use the work that's been created." The International Federation of Library Associations and Institutions (IFLA) issued a statement in support of controlled digital lending and highlighted the degree to which the COVID-19 pandemic underscored the need for legislation to enable libraries to provide temporary digital access to library holdings.

The Library's donation agreement with the Internet Archive was supported by library groups and New Zealand civil society organisations.

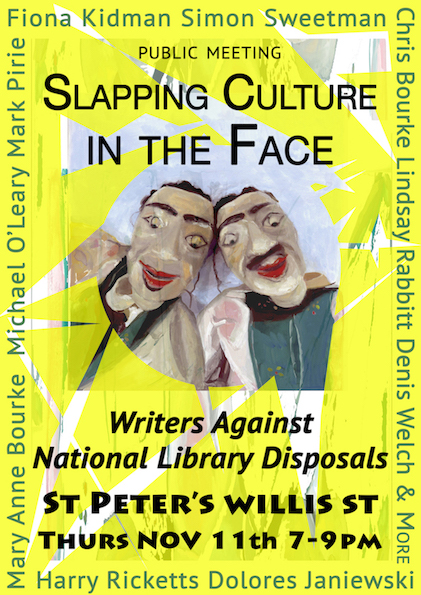
Writers Against NZ National Library Disposals opposition to reduction of National Library General Collections, November 2021

The overseas published collections project was supported by the library sector including the Council of New Zealand University Librarians (CONZUL), Library and Information Association of New Zealand Aotearoa (LIANZA) and the Library Information Advisory Committee (LIAC), which advises the Minister of Internal Affairs.

However, several groups including the Book Guardians Aotearoa, the Publishers' Association, the Society of Authors and Writers Against National Library Disposals have been opposing moves to donate the 600,000 books by writing articles, organising events and publishing a 64-page anthology of writing. Organisations that protect writer and publisher copyright particularly PANZ and NZSA (PEN NZ) are primarily concerned with the interests of their clients and members, e.g. illegal copying of books. Meanwhile, groups like Writers Against National Library Disposals (referred to by government as the "creative sector") and Book Guardians Aotearoa advocate for increased government funding for correct storage and professional curation of the international collection, to encourage and facilitate public accessibility to the threatened books. The Creative Sector does not oppose digitisation, but wishes it to occur within New Zealand as long as it fully respects authors' rights.

On 29 November 2021, the National Library of New Zealand announced that it was "reconsidering" its contract with Internet Archive, and would make an announcement in early 2022 regarding its continuation or cancellation. The National Library of New Zealand has also stated that it would enter into consultation with all the authors' rights and creative sector groups concerned, in 2022. On 31 October 2022, in a letter that seems to bring the protests and the process of disposals to some kind of resolution, the director of the New Zealand National Library announced that the library is "developing a new policy for removing and disposing of collection items". Details of this new policy are expected to be made public in 2023 prior to the next general election.

On 11 June 2025, the National Library confirmed that it would destroy 500,000 unused books after American publishers challenged its plans to sell the books to the Internet Archive.

== Collections ==
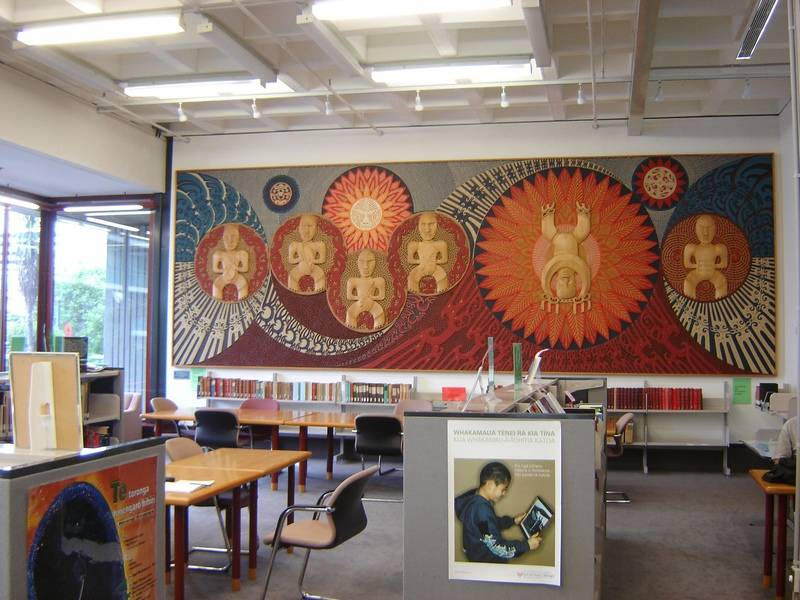
Reading room at National Library [pre-2009], Wellington

The National Library's collections are stored in the main building in Wellington and several other locations in New Zealand such as the former National Computer Centre in Whanganui. The library has three main groups: the General Collections which includes New Zealand published and overseas published volumes, the Schools Collection, and the collections of the Alexander Turnbull Library. Physical access to some of the collections may be requested through digital portals, and digital acquisitions are possible through products and online resources.

The General Collections focus on supporting the information needs of New Zealanders through services to individuals, schools and researchers, with notable collections such as the Dorothy Neal White Collection. The Schools Collection contains books and other material to support teaching and learning in New Zealand schools.

=== General Assembly Library collections ===
From the foundation of the National Library in 1965 until 1986 the General Assembly Library was one of the three pillars of the institution. The General Assembly Library had previously acted as a de facto National Library, offering recess privileges to the public when parliament was not in session. In 1924, for example, "6,135 books were issued during the recess period, and 670 recess access cards had been granted". The Chief Librarian further notes that "the New Zealand General Assembly Library is the only legislative library in the world from which volumes may be taken out during the recess". Until 1986, its collections included a significant overseas collection and copious parliamentary documents. The General Assembly Library became a stand-alone institution in 1986, when it restricted its focus to documents of immediate pertinence to parliamentary activities. Many of its overseas collections remained with the National Library and some works, particularly its rare books, then entered under the protection of the Alexander Turnbull Library.

=== Alexander Turnbull Library ===
The Alexander Turnbull Library was founded in 1919 by Alexander Turnbull (1868–1918), whose bequest to the nation included the 55,000 volume nucleus of the current collection. In later years, the library made its own acquisitions and his bequest was augmented with books from the General Assembly Library collections. The Alexander Turnbull Library is now part of National Library but its collections are fully protected by law and may not be sold or otherwise disposed of by the Direction of the National library. Unlike the general collections of the National Library, the collections of the Alexander Turnbull Library are normally held in its Wellington building, the National Library building constructed in 1987. Turnbull House, the library's former location in Bowen Street in downtown Wellington, is now managed by Heritage New Zealand. It is charged under the Act to:

- 'Preserve, protect, develop, and make accessible for all the people of New Zealand the collections of that library in perpetuity and in a manner consistent with their status as documentary heritage and taonga'; and
- 'Develop the research collections and the services of the Alexander Turnbull Library, particularly in the fields of New Zealand and Pacific studies and rare books'; and
- 'Develop and maintain a comprehensive collection of documents relating to New Zealand and the people of New Zealand.'

Turnbull collected the works of John Milton extensively, and the library now has holdings of Milton's works which are "ranked among the finest in the world" and "good collections of seventeenth-century poetical miscellanies and of Dryden material, ... along with fine sets of literary periodicals."

Chief librarians of the Alexander Turnbull Library have been:

- Johannes Andersen, 1919–1937
- Clyde Taylor, 1937–1963
- John Reece Cole, 1963–1965
- Graham Bagnall, 1966–1973
- Jim Traue, 1973–1990
- Margaret Calder, 1990–2007
- Chris Szekely, 2007–2024
- Jessica Moran, 2025-

The Friends of the Turnbull Library (FoTL) is an incorporated society that supports the work of the Alexander Turnbull Library by organising events, activities and offering an annual research grant to a scholars using the library's resources. FoTL also funds the publication of The Turnbull Library Record which publishes information about the activities of the library and showcases the library's collections. First published in 1940, digital issues of The Turnbull Library Record are available through Papers Past.

A number of archives held at the Alexander Turnbull Library have been added to the UNESCO Memory of the World Aotearoa New Zealand Ngā Mahara o te Ao register. These include:

- The Overture Aotearoa manuscript score, added in 2011.
- Katherine Mansfield's literary and personal papers and belongings, added in 2016.
- The Scottish migration collection, added in 2016.
- The World War I official photographs archive, added in 2017.
- The Tyree Studio collection, held at both the Alexander Turnbull Library and Nelson Provincial Museum, added in 2017.
- The Jack Lovelock Papers, added in 2018.
- The Cambodian women oral history project, added in 2018.
- The Sir Julius von Haast Collection, added in 2019.
- Robin Hyde's literary and personal papers, added in 2020.
- The William Harding collection, held both at the Alexander Turnbull Library and Whanganui Regional Museum, added in 2024.
- The collections of Frank Sargeson, added in 2024.

=== Turnbull Library collections ===
The library houses a number of specialty collections:

- Archive of New Zealand Music
- Cartographic Collection
- Drawings, Paintings and Prints
- Ephemera Collection
- Manuscripts and Archives
- National Newspaper Collection
- New Zealand and Pacific Book Collection
- New Zealand Cartoon Archive
- Music, Sounds and Audio-visual Collection
- Serials Collection
- New Zealand Web Archive
- Oral History and Sound
- Photographic Archive including work by Albert Percy Godber
- Rare Books and Fine Printing
- General Collection of Books relating to New Zealand and the Pacific
- Turnbull Named Collections.

The unpublished material held by the Turnbull Library can be searched in Tiaki.

=== He Tohu ===
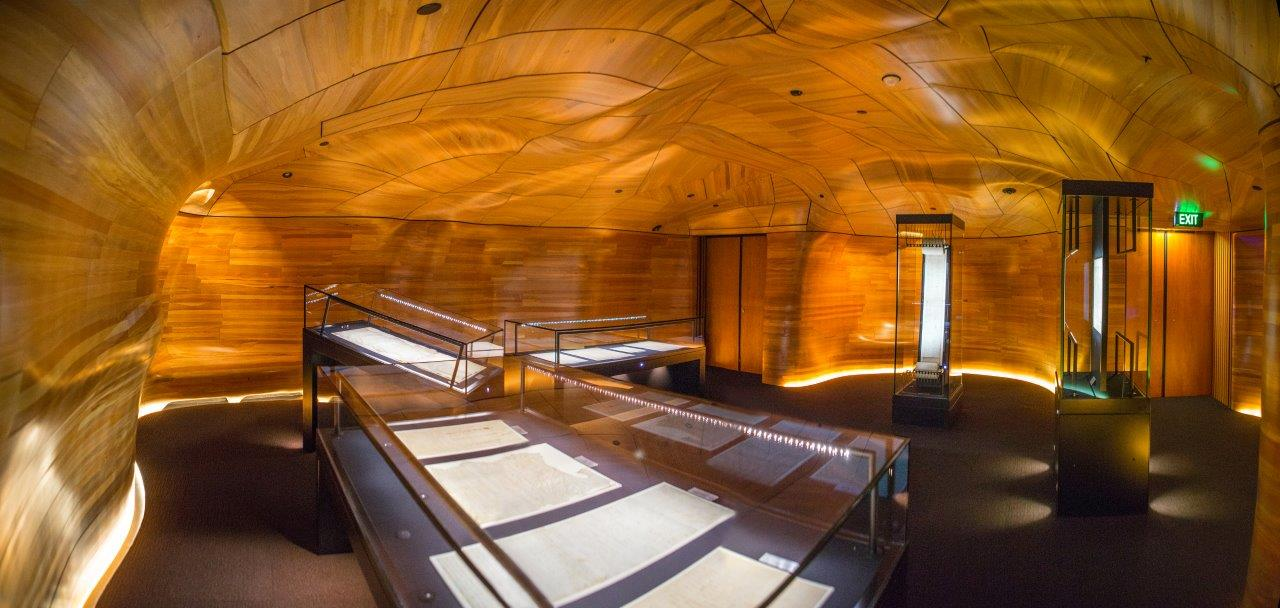
The He Tohu Document Room housing three New Zealand documents significant to its 19th century history

The He Tohu exhibition displays three nationally significant documents which are on loan from Archives New Zealand's holdings.

- Te Tiriti o Waitangi / The Treaty of Waitangi (1840)
- He Whakaputanga / Declaration of the Independence of the United Tribes of New Zealand (1835)
- Women's Suffrage Petition / Te Petihana Whakamana Pōti Wahine (1893)

The documents were moved from Archives New Zealand on 22 April 2017 under tight security.

== Services ==
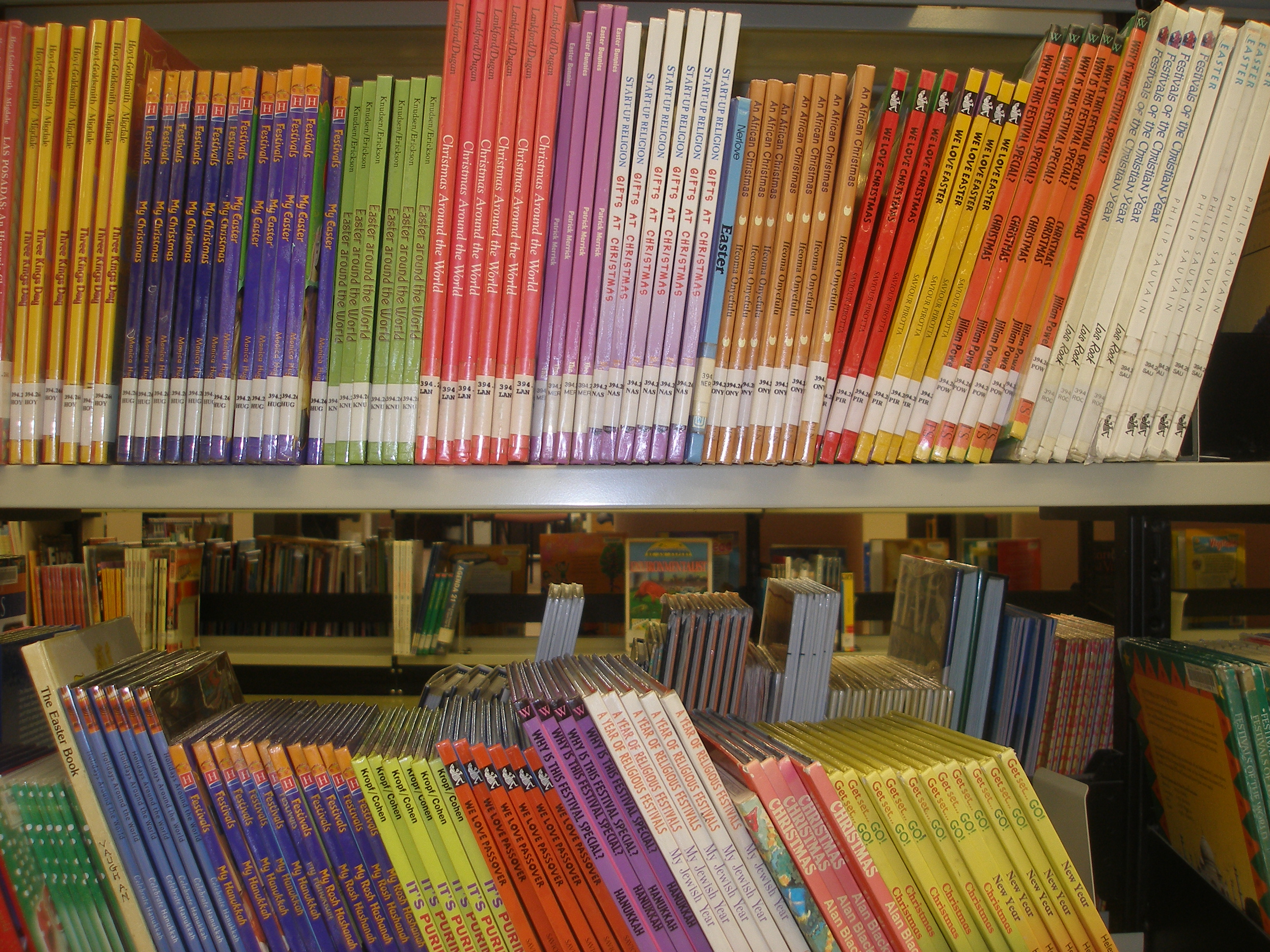
Books in the Schools Collection

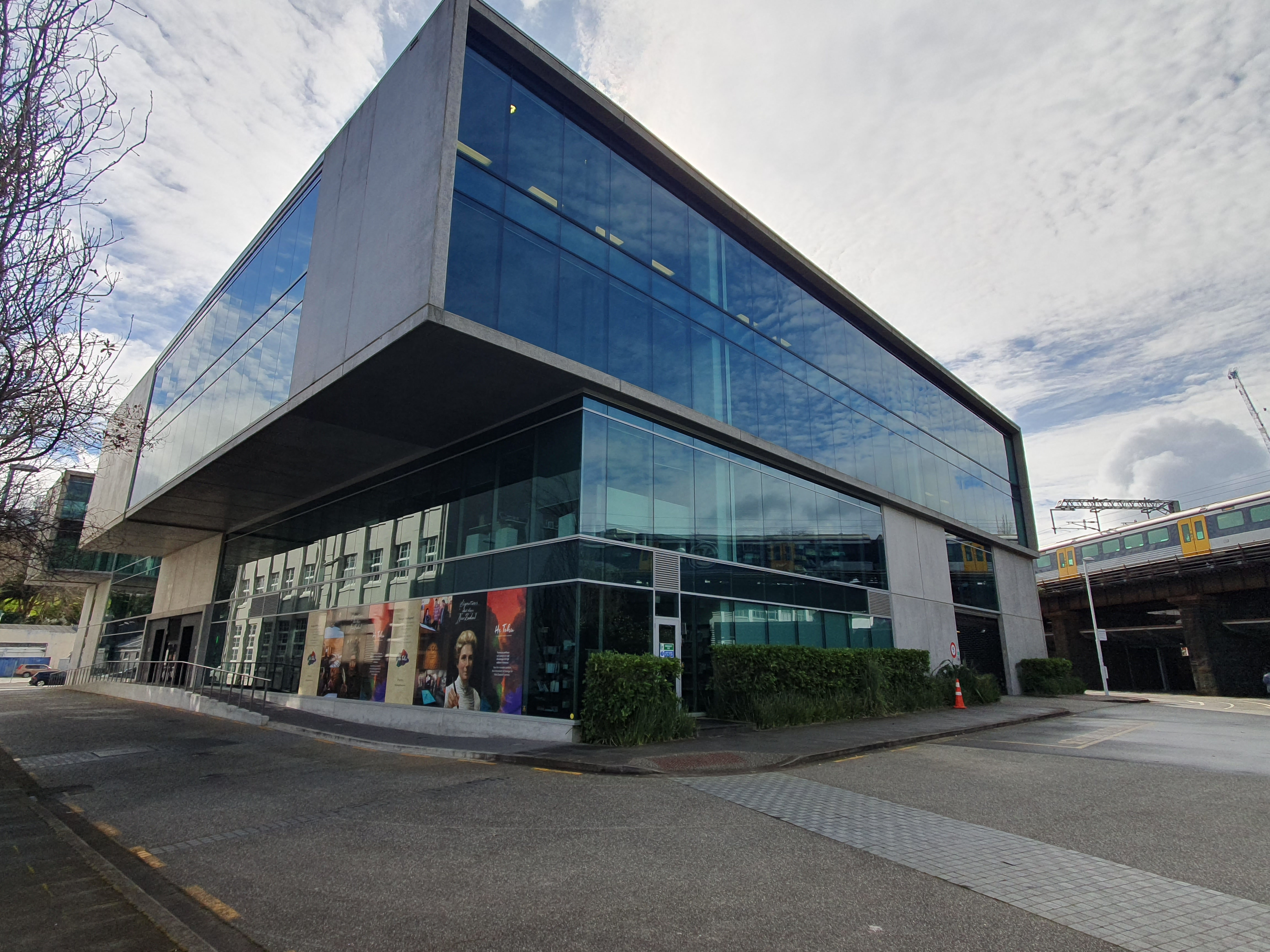
The National Library Auckland Centre in Parnell

The National Library has been providing support to schools since 1942 and the current service operates from centres in Auckland and Christchurch. Services to Schools has three priorities:

- reading engagement
- school libraries
- digital literacy

School libraries can keep up-to-date with research on school libraries, and gain advice on management, finance and staffing, collection management, library systems, and teaching and learning. Reading engagement encompasses advice on supporting children's reading and children's and young adults literature. Digital literacy supports the school library's role in developing digital literacy and inquiry learning.

Other services include:

- The Lending Service loans fiction and non-fiction books to schools and home educators
- Teaching and Learning Resources makes available a range of databases and curated resources to teachers and students. AnyQuestions is an online reference service for all New Zealand school students
- Professional and Learning Support for school librarians and educators via courses, events and online methods.

=== National Digital Heritage Archive ===
Established in 2004, the National Digital Heritage Archive (NDHA) is a partnership between the National Library, Ex Libris and Sun Microsystems to develop a digital archive and preservation management system. A digital storehouse, the system ensures that websites, digital images, CDs, DVDs and other 'digitally born' and digitised items that make up the Library's growing digital heritage collections will, despite technical obsolescence, be preserved and remain accessible to researchers, students and library users now and in the future.

=== Papers Past ===
The Papers Past website, run by the National Library of New Zealand, provides free access to digitised newspapers, magazines, journals, letters, diaries, and parliamentary papers from the 19th and 20th centuries. It was launched in 2001. In 2014 it included an estimated 3.3 million digitised pages; 11 years later that had grown to 9,403,907. In 2024 a correctable text feature was added, allowing users to correct automatically generated text.

=== Index New Zealand ===
Index New Zealand (INNZ) is a freely accessible online index of articles from journals, magazines and newspapers covering New Zealand and the South Pacific, with some links to the full text of articles. Updating of the Index ceased on 21 June 2024, though the historic entries will remain available.

=== Aotearoa People's Network Kaharoa ===
Established in 2007, the Aotearoa People's Network Kaharoa (APNK) provides internet access to the public through local libraries in New Zealand. Funding is provided by the New Zealand Government by way of the Community Partnership Fund and the National Library of New Zealand. The service is based in the Christchurch office of the National Library and supplies and maintains desktop computers and WiFi equipment at around 120 partner libraries, and provides them with filtered internet access in conjunction with internet service provider Snap. As of 2009, all partner libraries receive the equipment and access at no cost, although the APNK governance group periodically reviews funding arrangements.

In October 2009, Aotearoa People's Network Kaharoa won the 3M Award for Innovation in Libraries. In October 2010, Aotearoa People's Network Kaharoa won "Best Access Initiative 2010" from the Australia and New Zealand Internet Best Practice Awards.

== National librarians ==
- Geoff Alley, 1964–1968
- Hector Macaskill,1969–1972
- David McIntosh, 1972–1975
- Mary Ronnie, 1976–1981
- Peter G. Scott, 1982–1997
- Christopher Blake, 1997–2002
- Penny Carnaby, 2003–2010
- Bill Macnaught, 2011–2020
- Rachel Esson, 2020–present
