= Samuel Henry Drew =

New Zealand jeweller, watchmaker and naturalist (1844–1901)

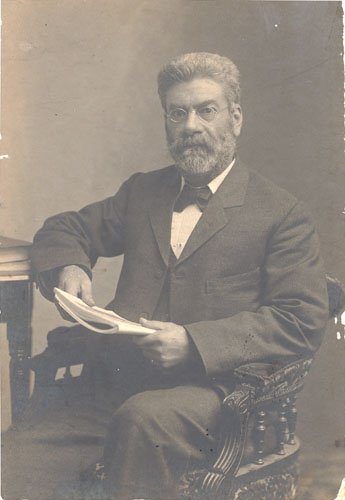
- Samuel Henry Drew
- Born: 17 November 1844; Maidenhead, United Kingdom
- Died: 18 December 1901 (aged 57); New Zealand
- Occupations: Naturalist, Jeweller, Watchmaker

Samuel Henry Drew (17 November 1844 – 18 December 1901) was a New Zealand jeweller, watchmaker, and amateur naturalist.

Samuel Henry Drew was born in Maidenhead, Berkshire, England on 17 November 1844. His parents emigrated to Tasmania, Australia, where he grew up. He was sent to England to learn his father's trade of watchmaking. Shortly after his return to Tasmania, the family emigrated to Nelson, New Zealand. There, he married Catherine Alice Beatson, the daughter of the architect William Beatson, on 8 May 1872. He moved with his wife to Wanganui.

He was a significant collector of molluscs, birds, and beetles, and exchanged specimens with Julius von Haast. Andreas Reischek helped him classify his collections on occasions, which were displayed at his family house in Wanganui. When the visiting public put too much pressure on the family, Drew agreed to have his collection given away, and it formed the nucleus of the Wanganui Public Museum, which opened on 24 March 1895. Drew became honorary curator of the museum, but died of a heart attack on 18 December 1901, aged 57. He had health problems before his death.

The museum, which is still in public ownership, is now known as the Whanganui Regional Museum and is located in Drews Avenue, Whanganui.
