= Janet Copsey =

New Zealand librarian

- Awards: Fellow of the Library and Information Association of New Zealand Aotearoa

Academic background
- Education: Victoria University of Wellington, University of Auckland

Janet Copsey is a New Zealand librarian, and University Librarian Emeritus at the University of Auckland. Copsey is a Fellow of the Library and Information Association of New Zealand Aotearoa, and Past President and Vice-President of the University of Auckland Society. She was Chair of the Pacific Rim Research Libraries Alliance from 2013 to 2015, and has served on the OCLC Global Council.

== Career ==
Copsey has a Dip NZLS from Victoria University of Wellington, and a Bachelor of Arts and Dip Bus from the University of Auckland. Copsey was a librarian at the University of Auckland and Director of Libraries and Learning Services. Under her leadership, the university joined the Orcid scheme to assist in correct attribution of university researcher's work, and saw a shift in student need from physical to digital resources. Copsey led the formation of the university's Kate Edger Information Commons, which opened in 2003.

Copsey was elected as a Fellow of the Library and Information Association of New Zealand Aotearoa (known as LIANZA) in the 1990s.

In 2006 she was appointed by the government to the Library and Information Commission, alongside Bill Macnaught, Evelyn Tobin and Paul Thompson. The commission advises the Minister of Internal Affairs on issues relating to libraries and information services, and specifically including mātauranga Māori. Copsey was also a member of the Council of New Zealand University Libraries, and an inaugural member of the OCLC Asia-Pacific Regional Council. From 2008 she served a two year term on the OCLC Global Council, and between 2013 and 2015 she was Chair of the Pacific Rim Research Libraries Alliance, which focuses on improving global access to digital scholarly materials.

As of 2024 she is Vice-President of the University of Auckland Society. She was President of the society from 2016 to 2020 and was elected vice-president in 2022.
