= William Harding (photographer) =

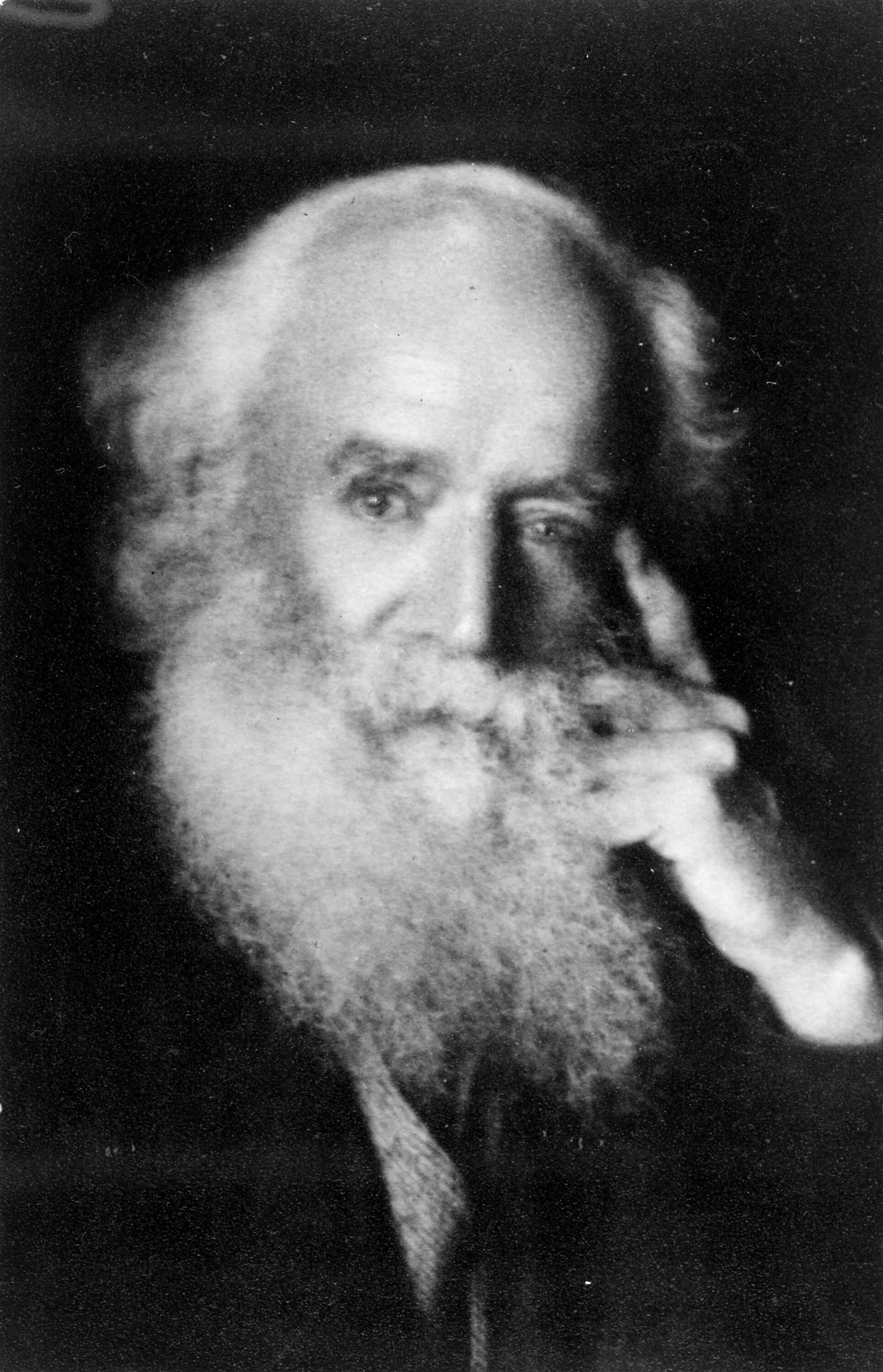
- Harding photographed at around 70 years of age, circa 1896
- Born: William James Harding; 19 September 1826; Southampton, Hampshire, England
- Died: 13 May 1899 (aged 72); Sydney, New South Wales, Australia
- Occupation: Photographer

William James Harding (19 September 1826 – 13 May 1899) was a New Zealand photographer.

Harding was born in Southampton, Hampshire, England on 19 September 1826, one of eight children.

On 3 September 1853 Harding married Annie Baker at the New Christian Church in Argyle Square, London. At that time he was a coachbuilder. They were to have eight children.

William and Annie Harding arrived in New Zealand in 1855. Two brothers had already emigrated – John in 1842 and Thomas in 1848. The three brothers, and Annie, were followers of Emanuel Swedenborg, and strong supporters of the Total Abstinence Society. William and Annie settled in Wanganui, where William set up briefly as a cabinet-maker but in 1856 established a photographic studio. By the 1860s his studio was installed in a two-storeyed, corrugated-iron building on Ridgway Street. He practised photography until 1889.

He had a collection of almost 6,500 glass-plate negatives which were nearly dumped by the studio’s new owner. Harding's work was rescued by a relative of his and the Whanganui Museum. In 1948, it was bought by the Alexander Turnbull Library, a division of the National Library of New Zealand located in Wellington.

Harding died on 13 May 1899, aged 72, in Sydney, New South Wales, Australia.

== Legacy ==
Harding's photographs held at the Alexander Turnbull Library and the Whanganui Museum were inscribed on the UNESCO Memory of the World Aotearoa New Zealand Ngā Mahara o te Ao register in 2024.

== Gallery ==
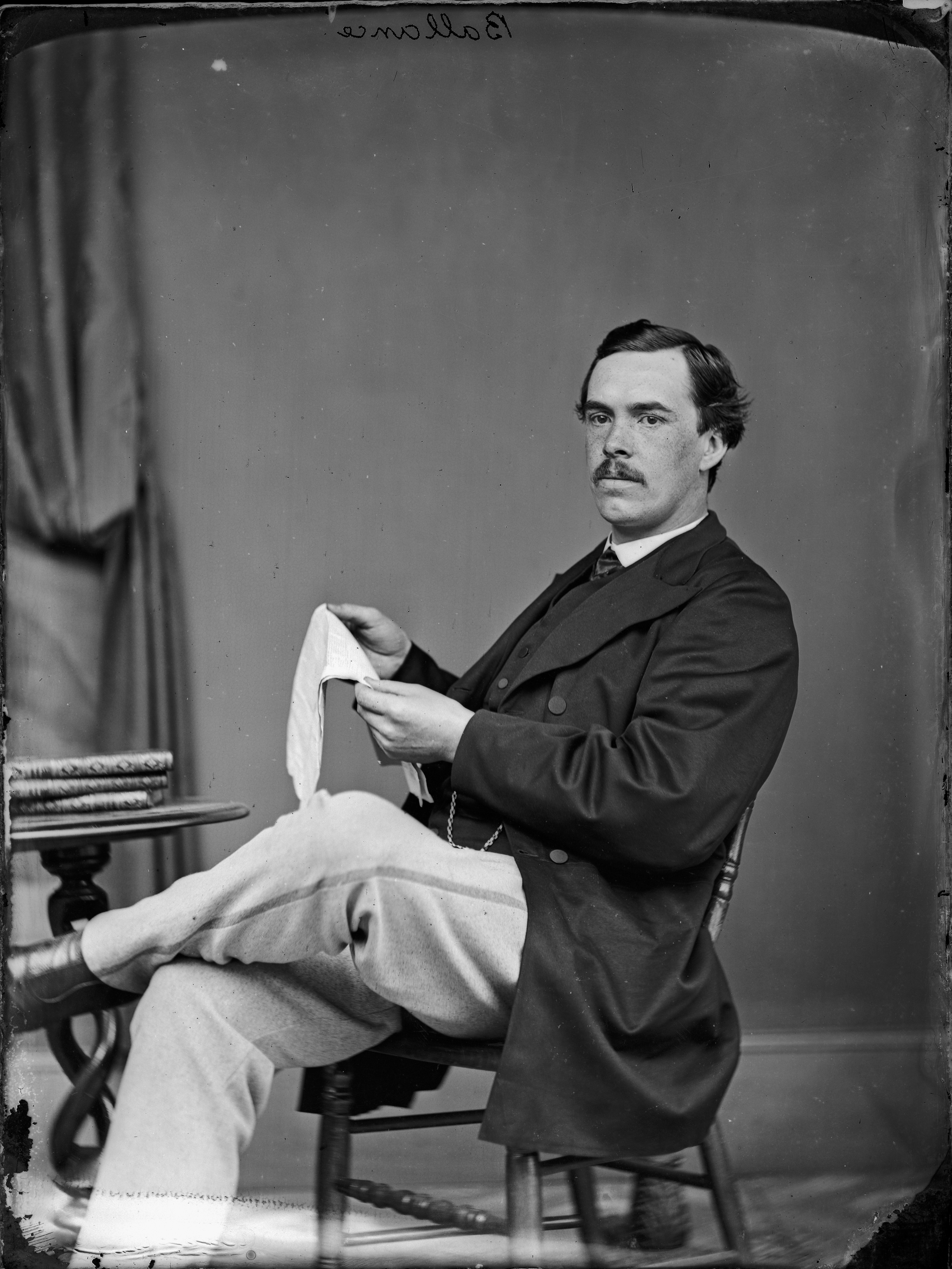
John Ballance, photographed by Harding circa 1870

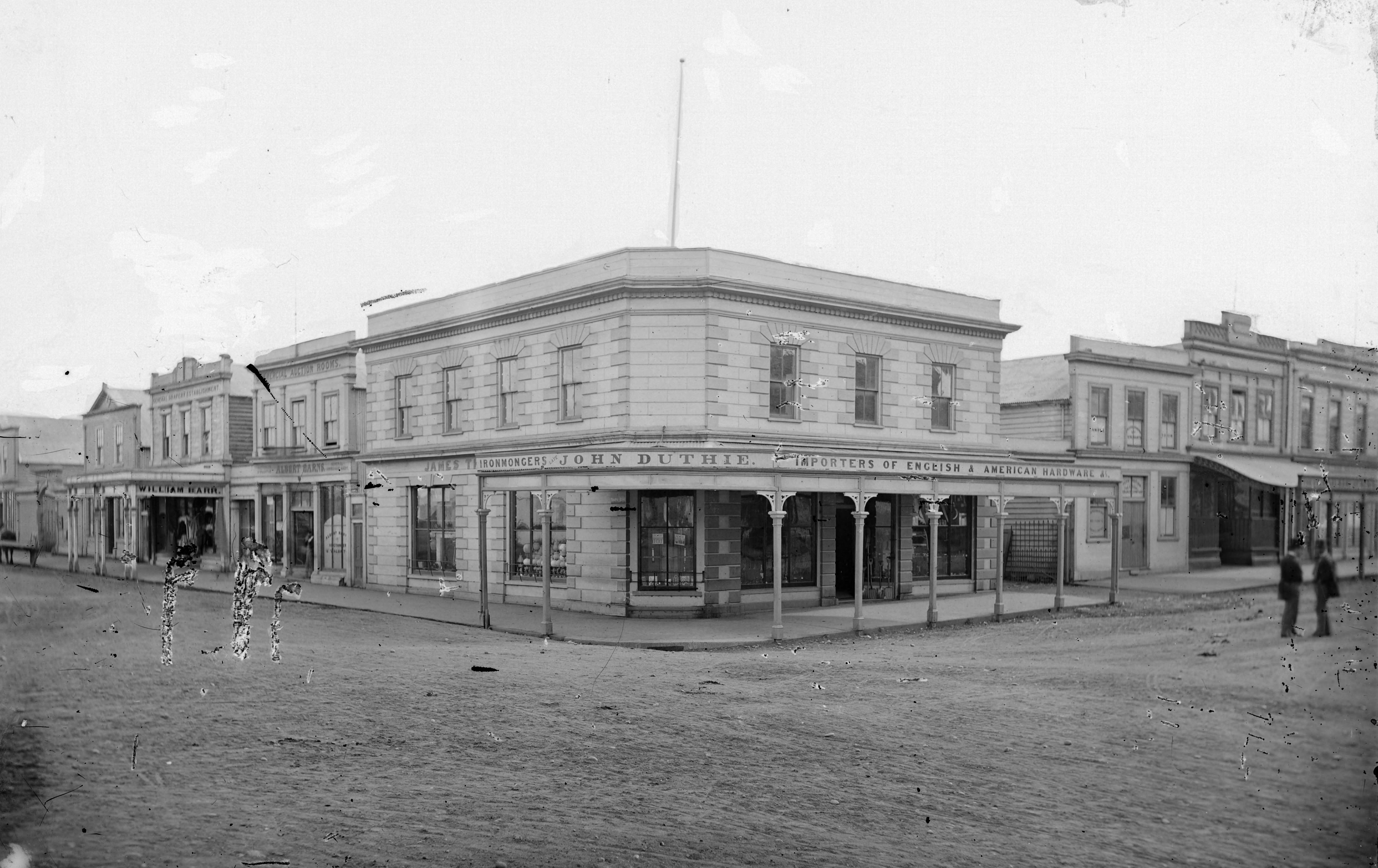
The John Duthie ironmongers in Whanganui, photographed in the 1870s

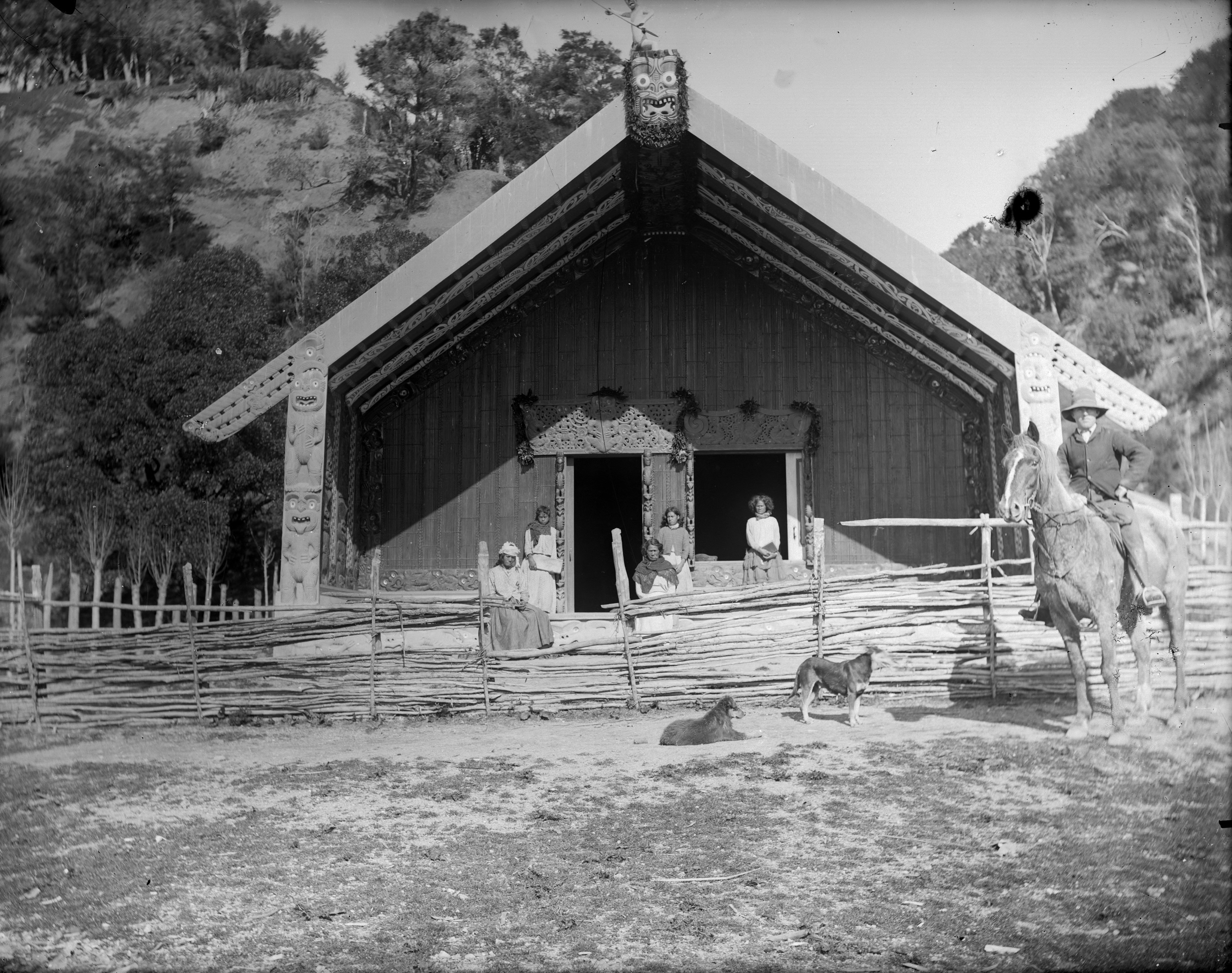
Porourangi meeting house at Waiomatatini, photographed by Harding circa 1888

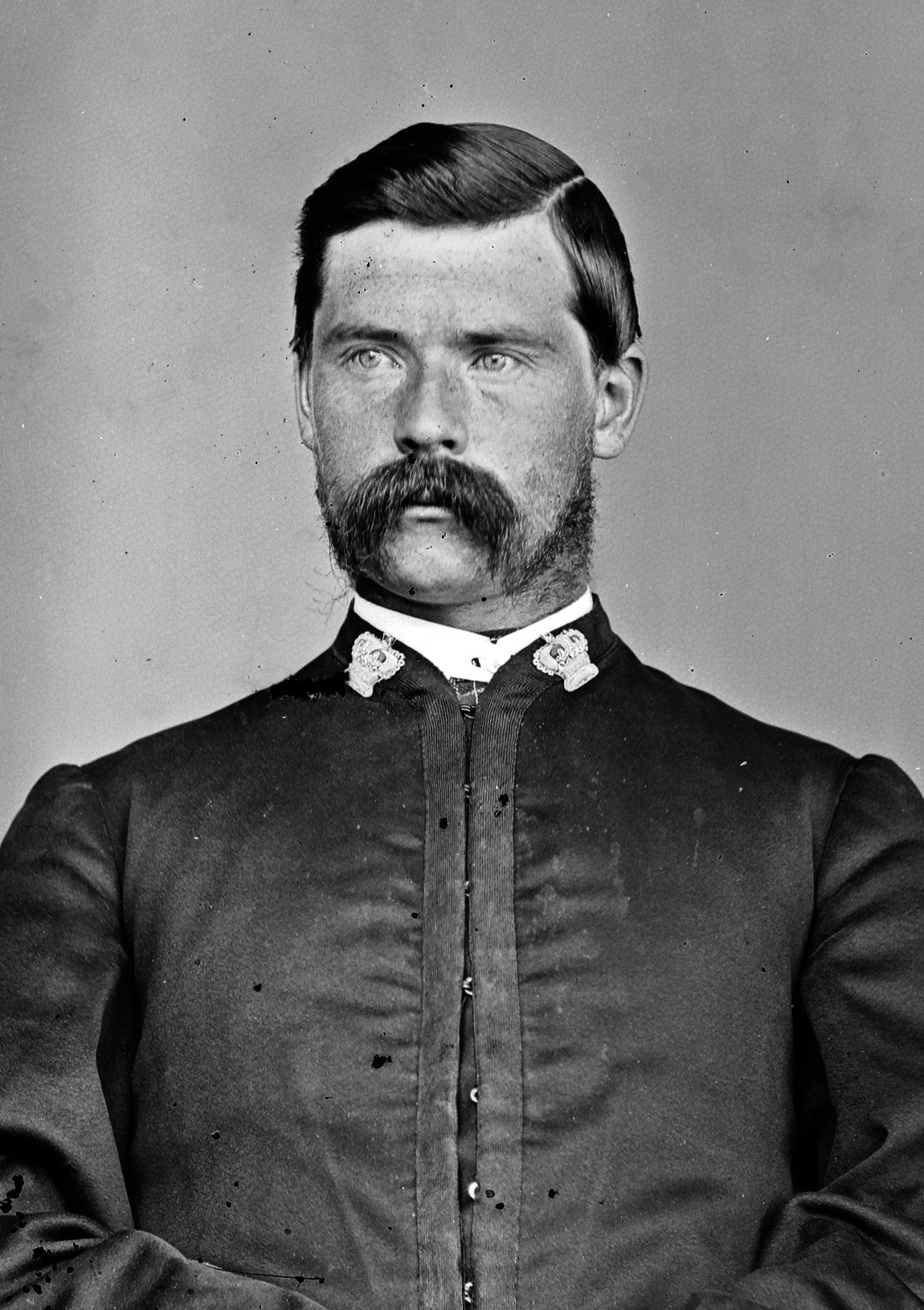
Walter Edward Gudgeon, photographed by Harding circa 1870
