= New Zealand Library Association =

Professional organization

Coordinates: 41.2864°S 174.7744°E

The New Zealand Library Association Inc., operating as LIANZA (Library and Information Association of New Zealand Aotearoa), is the professional organisation for library and information workers in New Zealand, and also promotes library and information education and professional development within New Zealand.

== Purpose and structure ==
The purpose of LIANZA is to advocate and coordinate for library and information professionals. LIANZA is governed by an elected National Council. Part of the role is to provide professional development and there are awards and publications. The National Library of New Zealand and LIANZA have a longstanding relationship.

== History ==
The organisation was founded in 1910 as the Libraries Association of New Zealand. "On the 26th January 1910 the Dunedin City Council resolved 'That it is desirable to convene a conference of the representatives from Public Libraries of New Zealand for the purposes of discussing matters affecting the general conduct and management of libraries in this Dominion'". Fifteen delegates from seven public libraries met in Dunedin on 26 and 28 March 1910 and formed the Libraries Association of New Zealand. Membership consisted of public libraries, the Parliamentary Library, and other libraries. In the 1930s membership was opened to individuals and for a time from 1935 every librarian in New Zealand was a member. In 1939, it became the New Zealand Library Association (NZLA) and was made a body corporate by the New Zealand Library Association Act 1939. The Association changed its trading name twice to reflect two restructurings in the 1990s, the first was in 1993 when it became the New Zealand Library and Information Association (NZLIA) and the second was in 1999 when it became the Library and Information Association of New Zealand Aotearoa (LIANZA).

== Membership ==
LIANZA's headquarters are located in Wellington, New Zealand. LIANZA is a member of the International Federation of Library Associations (IFLA). LIANZA accepts both individual and organisational members, the only requirement being an interest in library or information science. As at June 2009 LIANZA had 1,519 individual members and 404 institutional members. In addition to participating in events and opportunities offered by LIANZA itself, members are encouraged to be involved in their regional communities and in special interest groups (SIGs) that foster professional relationships in specific library and information studies fields.

== Organisation ==
The organisation is governed by its National Council, which is chaired by the president and based at the National Office in Wellington. In addition to the national association, the LIANZA community includes eleven SIGs and six Regional Councils, as well as affiliations with the New Zealand Law Librarians Association (NZLLA), School Librarians Association of New Zealand Aotearoa (SLANZA) and the New Zealand Branch of the International Association of Music Libraries. In addition is Te Rōpū Whakahau which is a national organisation for Māori librarians and information specialists founded as a LIANZA special interest group in 1992. Te Rōpū Whakahau became an independent organisation in 1996. Tumuaki (leaders) of Te Rōpū Whakahau have included Cellia Joe-Olsen and Anahera Sadler.

The six regions in which the regional councils are located are: Hikuwai (formerly Auckland) Region; Waikato/Bay of Plenty Region; Ikaroa (formerly Central) Region; Te Upoko o te Ika a Maui Region; Aoraki Region; and the Otago/Southland Region. The Maori names of many of these regional groups reflect the importance of biculturalism in New Zealand. SIGs include groups for library fields such as cataloguing, tertiary (academic) librarianship, health librarianship, information technology, preservation, special librarianship, and public librarianship, as well as a bicultural group, regional groups such as the East Coast Information Network, a Special Libraries Group for the north of New Zealand, and the Taranaki Information group. Other groups include the Special Needs SIG and the Research SIG.

LIANZA is responsible for several publications. Chief among these is Library Life, LIANZA's fortnightly e-newsletter, and the New Zealand Library and Information Management Journal (NZLIMJ).

== Professional development and continuing education ==
LIANZA runs a national conference bi-annually, in which issues pertaining to librarianship in New Zealand and across the world are discussed. Although LIANZA does not currently accredit library and information education in New Zealand, the LIANZA website provides a summary of New Zealand library qualifications. The Master of Library and Information Studies (offered by Victoria University of Wellington) and the PhD is accepted in the United States, the United Kingdom and other countries. The LIANZA website also offers a listing of defunct library qualifications for comparison.

The organisation sponsors book awards, including the New Zealand Book Awards for Children and Young Adults into which the LIANZA Children's Book Awards for distinguished children's literature were merged in 2016), as well as industry awards such as the YBP/Lindsay and Croft award recognising contributions in collections development and management, acquisition, and cataloguing.

In addition, LIANZA sponsors several scholarships for continuing research in several aspects of the field of librarianship. Study awards are awarded to library professionals who wish to further their professional development. LIANZA also offers student awards and several professional recognition awards.

== Professional registration ==
In 2006, The LIANZA council endorsed the motion to introduce the Professional Registration Scheme, initially prepared by the LIANZA Taskforce on Professional Registration. On 1 July 2007 this comprehensive scheme for registration and continuing professional development was introduced.

Professional Registration provides:

- a goal for the ongoing professional development of individual practitioners
- a framework for employers to coach and develop their library and information professional staff
- an assurance for future employers, both in New Zealand and overseas, that a registered member meets professional standards of competency in the body of knowledge and ethics required for professional library and information work
- International benchmarking and recognition of professional library qualifications for New Zealanders wishing to work overseas.

The scheme recognises library and information professionals who:

- have studied the body of library professional knowledge to a graduate level or higher
- can show that they understand and can apply that body of knowledge, and professional ethics, to a satisfactory standard
- adhere to the code of professional conduct
- continue to update their professional knowledge throughout their careers

To qualify for registration, library and information professionals must:

- show a theoretical understanding of the body of knowledge at graduate level or higher
- practically apply the body of knowledge in a library or information management environment.

All those participating in the scheme must revalidate their registration every 3 years. This involves keeping a journal planner of continuing professional development as well as other activities that demonstrate they have kept their professional body of knowledge current. The journal planner is reviewed by an Employer or RLIANZA peer and then the Profession Registration Board before registration is renewed.

Registered individuals are entitled to use the letters RLIANZA (Registered Member of the library and information profession).

== Differences from library associations in other countries ==
LIANZA does not currently offer accreditation to academic institutions offering library and information studies degrees. Professional degrees and education in librarianship have been available in New Zealand since 1946, but the educational style of New Zealand library schools differs from that of North American library schools.

== Notable people ==
Notable people associated with LIANZA include Penny Carnaby, president of LIANZA from 1999 to 2000, and honorary life member. University of Auckland librarian emeritus Janet Copsey is also a Fellow of LIANZA.
