= Alf Copsey =

Australian rules footballer

Personal information
- Full name: Alf Copsey
- Born: 22 January 1921
- Died: 7 March 1996 (aged 75)
- Original team: Sandringham
- Height: 180 cm (5 ft 11 in)
- Weight: 76 kg (168 lb)

Playing career^{1}
Years	Club	Games (Goals)
1946	Melbourne	5 (0)
1947–1948	St Kilda	13 (0)
Total		18 (0)
- ^{1} Playing statistics correct to the end of 1948.

Alf Copsey (22 January 1921 – 7 March 1996) was an Australian rules footballer who played for the Melbourne Football Club and St Kilda Football Club in the Victorian Football League (VFL).
