= Penny Carnaby =

New Zealand librarian and Professor of Digital Knowledge Systems

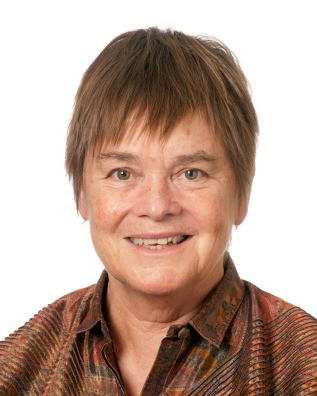
- Born: 1949; United Kingdom

Academic background
- Education: University of New South Wales, Leeds Beckett University

Academic work
- Institutions: Christchurch Polytechnic Institute of Technology, Macquarie University, National Library of New Zealand, Lincoln University

Penny Carnaby (born 1949) is a New Zealand librarian and Professor of Digital Knowledge Systems, and is professor emerita at Lincoln University. She is a former National Librarian of New Zealand, and has also worked at Christchurch Polytechnic Institute of Technology and Macquarie University.

== Academic career ==
Carnaby is originally British and grew up in the Hunter Valley, in Australia. She completed a Bachelor of Arts degree at the University of New South Wales, and a Diploma of Education at Leeds Polytechnic (now Leeds Beckett University). Carnaby worked in a public library in the UK before taking a job at the Christchurch Polytechnic Institute of Technology. She worked there for 23 years, in a number of roles including Deputy Librarian, Librarian and Head of Resources.

Carnaby talking about open access in 2014

Carnaby was president of the Library and Information Association of New Zealand Aotearoa in 1999 and 2000, and was awarded an honorary life membership of the association in 2001. From 2000 to 2002 she was first Deputy Librarian and then University Librarian at Macquarie University in Australia. In 2003 Carnaby was appointed CEO of the National Library of New Zealand, and National Librarian.

In 2011 Carnaby was appointed as the Director of Library, Teaching and Learning and Professor of Digital Knowledge Systems at Lincoln University, retiring in 2015, when she was awarded professor emerita status. During her time at Lincoln she introduced an open-access policy for publications, data, and teaching materials, which was a first for a New Zealand university. Carnaby has said that as public funded institutions, universities should be publicly accessible. She is particularly interested in how to preserve raw research data in the face of constantly changing technology.
