= Bill Macnaught =

British and New Zealand librarian

William John Macnaught CBE (born 1951) was New Zealand's National Librarian from 2011 to 2020. Before becoming National Librarian he was manager of Puke Ariki in New Plymouth, New Zealand, and Head of Cultural Development at Gateshead Council in England.

== Early life ==
Macnaught was born in Stirling, Scotland and educated at the University of St Andrews and The University of Strathclyde.

== Career ==
Macnaught spent 14 years from 1991 to 2005 at the Gateshead Council as the Director, Libraries and Arts and later Head of Cultural Development where he was instrumental in promoting the cultural life of Gateshead and the installation of Antony Gormley's statue the Angel of the North.

From 2005 to 2011 Macnaught was manager of Puke Ariki museum and library in New Plymouth, moving from there to the National Library to become the National Librarian. During his tenure the National Library installed the He Tohu exhibition which displays Te Tiriti o Waitangi (The Treaty of Waitangi), He Whakaputanga (the Declaration of the Independence of the United Tribes of New Zealand) and the Women's Suffrage Petition (Te Petihana Whakamana Pōti Wahine).

He retired from the National Library in December 2020.

== Honours and awards ==
Macnaught received the Commander of the Order of the British Empire (CBE) in the 2005 Birthday Honours for his services to public libraries and cultural life in north east England.

== Publications ==
- Macnaught, B. (2004), "Impact and performance measurement in public library services in the UK", Performance Measurement and Metrics, 5(3):96-100. https://doi.org/10.1108/14678040410570102
- Macnaught, B. (2018), "The National Library of New Zealand (Te Puna Mātauranga o Aotearoa)". Alexandria, 28(3):192-196. https://doi.org/10.1177/0955749019871427
