= Motutara Island =

Island in the Hauraki Gulf, New Zealand

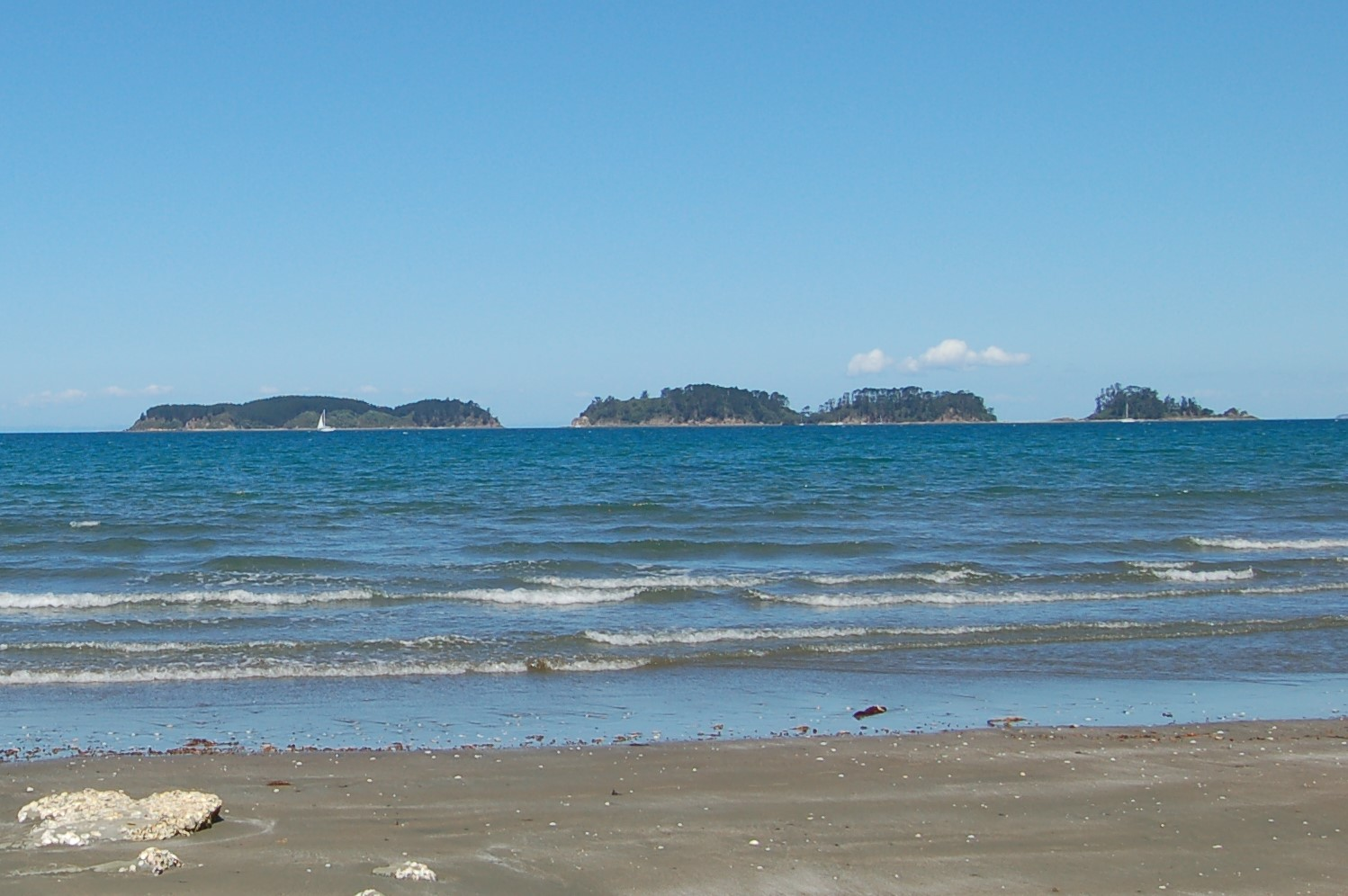
- Motuketekete, Moturekareka and Motutara Islands seen from Martins Bay, Mahurangi
- Interactive map of Motutara Island

Geography
- Location: Auckland
- Coordinates: 36°28′36″S 174°47′28″E
- Adjacent to: Hauraki Gulf
- Area: 45,000 m^{2} (480,000 sq ft)
- Highest elevation: 33 m (108 ft)

Administration
- New Zealand

Motutara Island is an uninhabited island in the northern Hauraki Gulf, off the northeastern coast of New Zealand's North Island. It is connected to Moturekareka Island by a tombolo, and is a part of the Moturekareka Group of islands, alongside Motuketekete Island.

== Geography ==
The island is located approximately 4.7 km (2.9 mi) southwest of Kawau Island, and around 13.5 km (8.4 mi) southeast of Warkworth, in the Hauraki Gulf. The island is connected by a sand bank to Moturekareka Island in the east, which is above sea level for 23.5 hours of the day. Small rocky islands called the Rocky Islets are located to the south, and the Inner Channel separates Motutara Island from the North Island.

== History ==
Motutara was quarried after 1929 after the land was acquired by the New Zealand Government. Operating in the 1930s and 1940s, stone from the quarry was used to construct roads between Auckland and Whangārei. In 1968, the quarry reserve (located on one third of the island) was transferred to the Hauraki Gulf Maritime Park, becoming a nature reserve. In the 1970s, the private owners of the remaining two-thirds of the island proposed to create an illegal subdivision on the island. This land became part of the Hauraki Gulf Maritime Park in 1975.
