= Moturekareka Island =

Island in New Zealand

- Interactive map of Moturekareka Island

Geography
- Location: Hauraki Gulf
- Coordinates: 36°28′27″S 174°47′55″E
- Area: 19 ha (47 acres)

Administration
- New Zealand

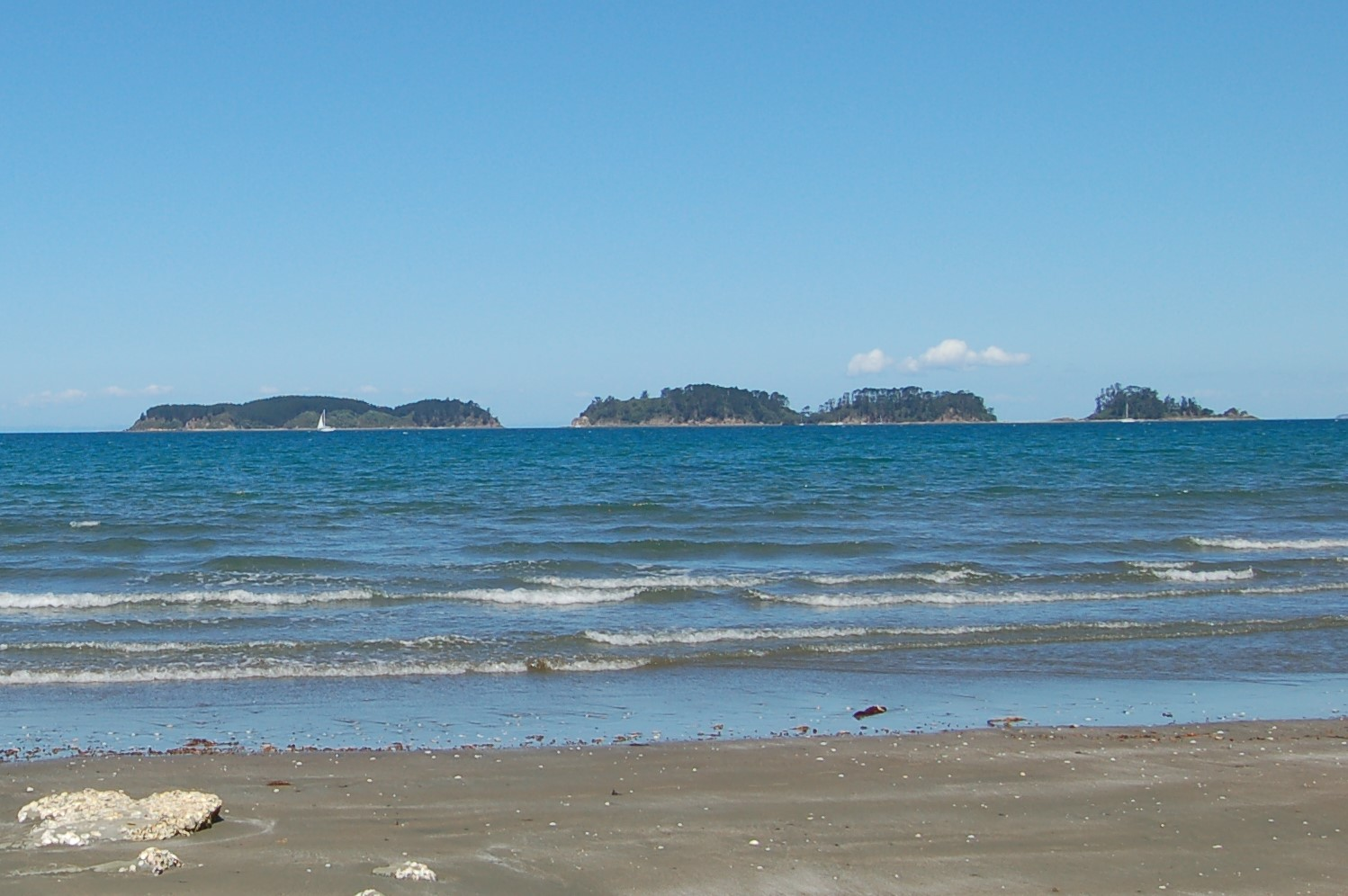
Motuketekete, Moturekareka and Motutara Islands seen from Martins Bay, Mahurangi

Moturekareka Island is a small island off the southern edge of Kawau Island in Auckland's Hauraki Gulf, approximately 43.7 kilometres (27.2 miles) north of Auckland. It is separated from nearby Motuketekete Island by Blanche Channel. This island is where the Rewa was sunk.

== Geography ==
Moturekareka Island has an area of 0.19 square kilometers and is approximately 4.2 kilometers southwest of Kawau Island. The highest point on the island is approximately 48 meters above sea level. The island has steep slopes, and a relatively flat eastern plateau.

== History ==
Moturekareka Island, along with the nearby islands of Moturoa and Motuketekete were purchased by John Long Haydon from the Māori, including Hōri Pōkai Te Ruinga, chiefs from Ngāti Paoa, and others in March 1845 for 18 pounds and 12 blankets. 3 years later at 1848, the Land Commission decided that the land was part of a previous land settlement, so the land was given to the crown and Haydon was paid as compensation. Decades later in 1920, Charlie Percy Hansen purchased Moturekareka Island, where he lived from the late 1920s to early 1940s, where he moved away from the island and died in 1944. Currently, the island is a tourist attraction where people can kayak around the remains of the Rewa.

=== the Rewa shipwreck ===
A full-rigged four-masted steel ship constructed in the English seaport of Whitehaven in Cumbria was launched as the "Alice A. Leigh" in September 1889. The ship was renamed the Rewa in 1920, and was bought by Charlie Percy Hansen in 1930. Hansen intentionally sunk the ship on the northeastern side of the island as a breakwater for a cove on the island.
