= Takangaroa Island =

Island in New Zealand

Takangaroa
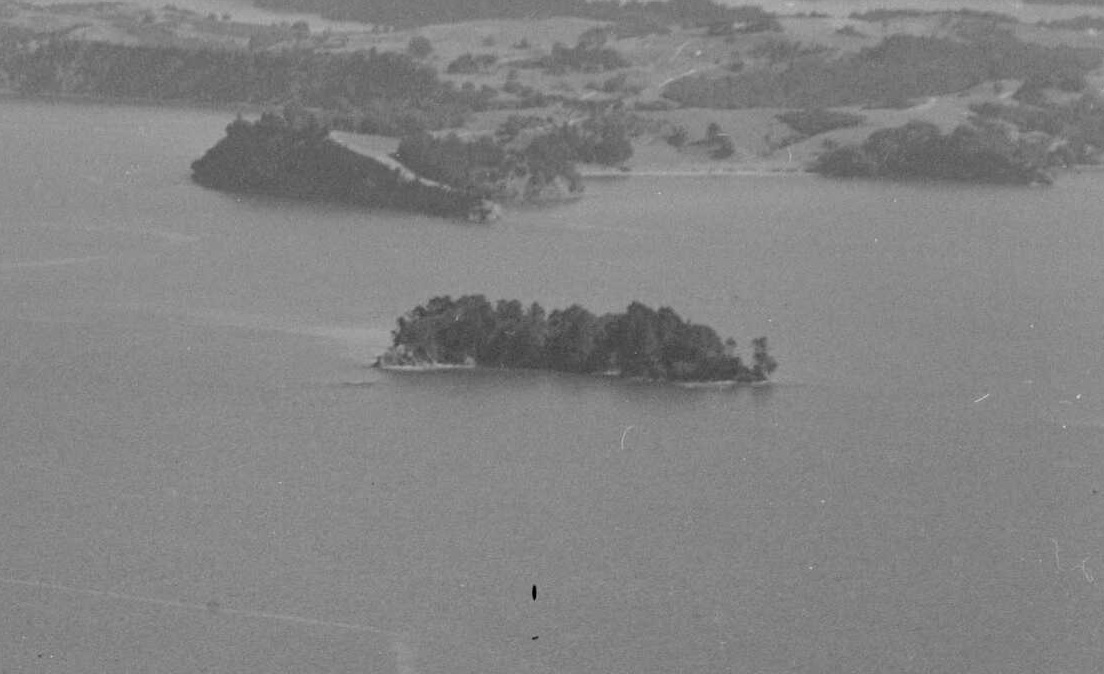
- Takangaroa Island seen in 1957
- Interactive map of Takangaroa

Geography
- Location: Hauraki Gulf
- Coordinates: 36.425°S 174.794°E
- Area: 6 ha (15 acres)

Administration
- New Zealand

Demographics
- Population: 0

Takangaroa Island (formerly known as Goat Island) is one of the two Mayne Islands located near Kawau Island, in New Zealand's Hauraki Gulf. It is approximately 6 hectares (15 acres) in size.

Its name is Māori, and means "The Long Casting of the Net". Nearby Rabbit Island is known as Takangariki, "The Short Casting of the Net", and two rocky reefs between them are considered to be the buoys of the net.

The island was known as Goat Island until 1971, when the name was legally changed to the Māori name in order to prevent confusion with the popular marine reserve.

During the late 19th century, it was owned by George Grey, the former Governor-General of New Zealand. The island is now privately owned, and is a wildlife sanctuary, meaning that no dogs, cats or guns are allowed.

== See also ==
- List of islands of New Zealand
