= Pumphouse ruins =

Heritage listed ruins of a pumphouse on Kawau Island, New Zealand

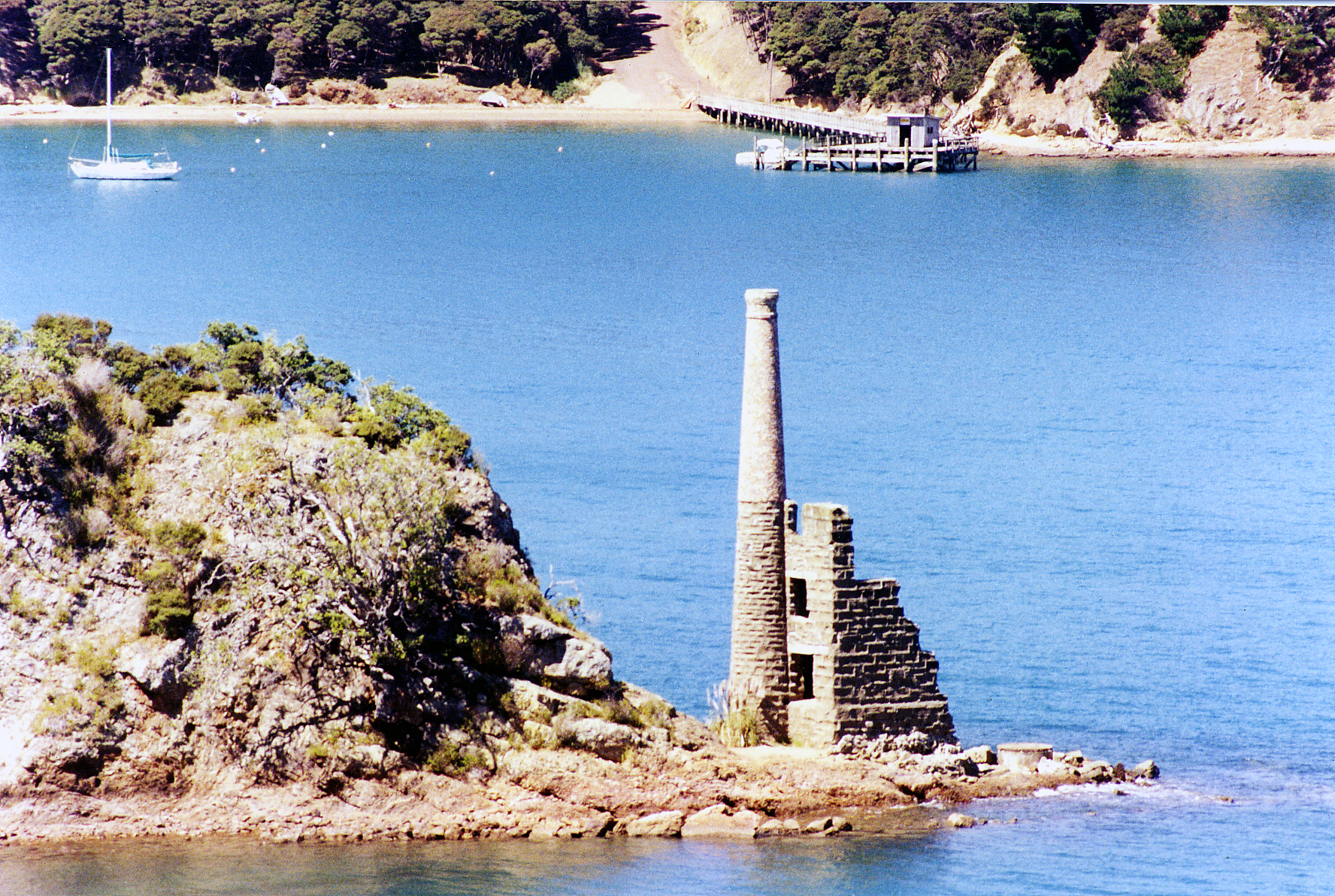
- Pumphouse ruins in 2005
- Interactive map of the Pumphouse ruins area

General information
- Location: Dispute Bay; Kawau Island; New Zealand
- Coordinates: 36°26′20.39″S 174°49′48.24″E
- Completed: 1854

Heritage New Zealand – Category 1
- Designated: 23 June 1983
- Reference no.: 9

The Pumphouse ruins on Kawau Island, New Zealand, belong to the copper mine established in 1844. The mine had ongoing problems, including legal, mismanagement, and flooding. To address the latter issue, a pumphouse was built in 1854. The ruins were registered by the New Zealand Historic Places Trust (now called Heritage New Zealand) on 23 June 1983 with registration number 9. The ruins have a category I listing.

== Gallery ==
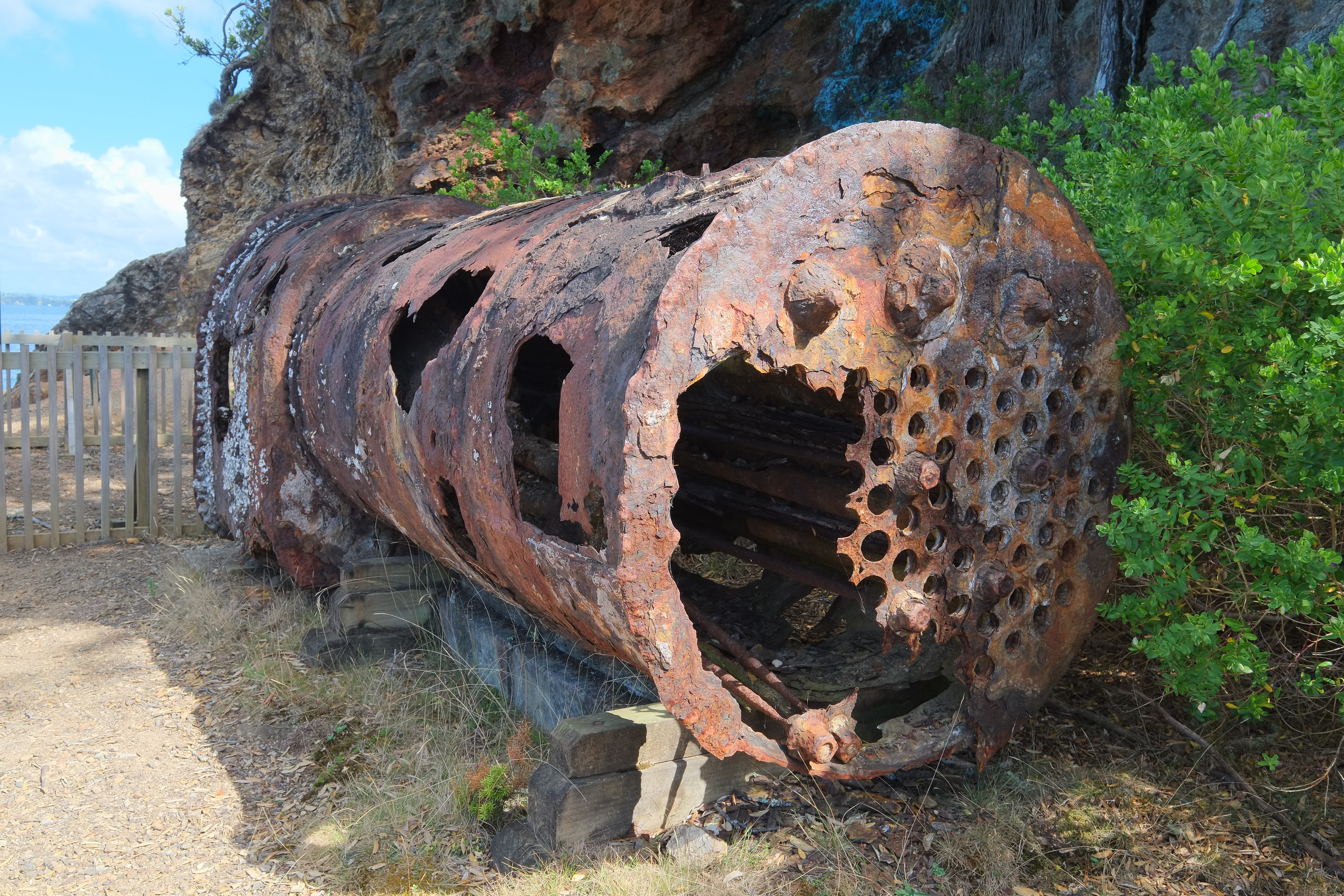
Boiler remains at copper mine site on Kawau Island

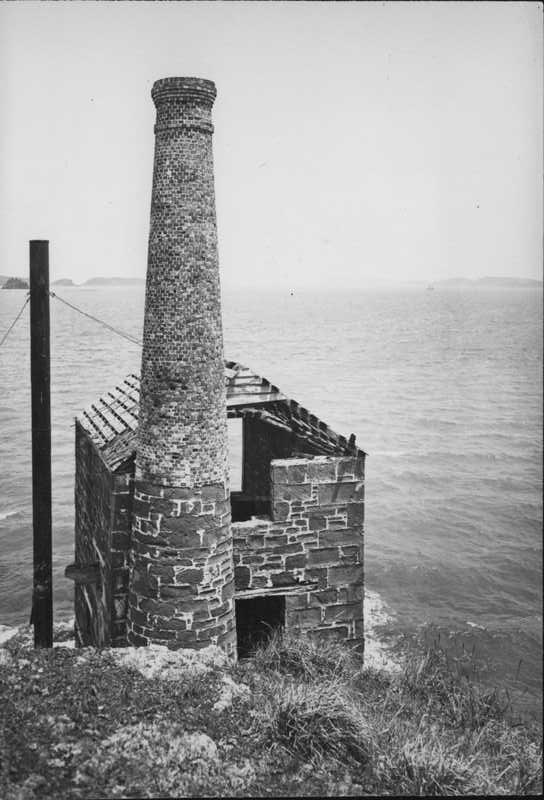
1900 photograph of the pumphouse

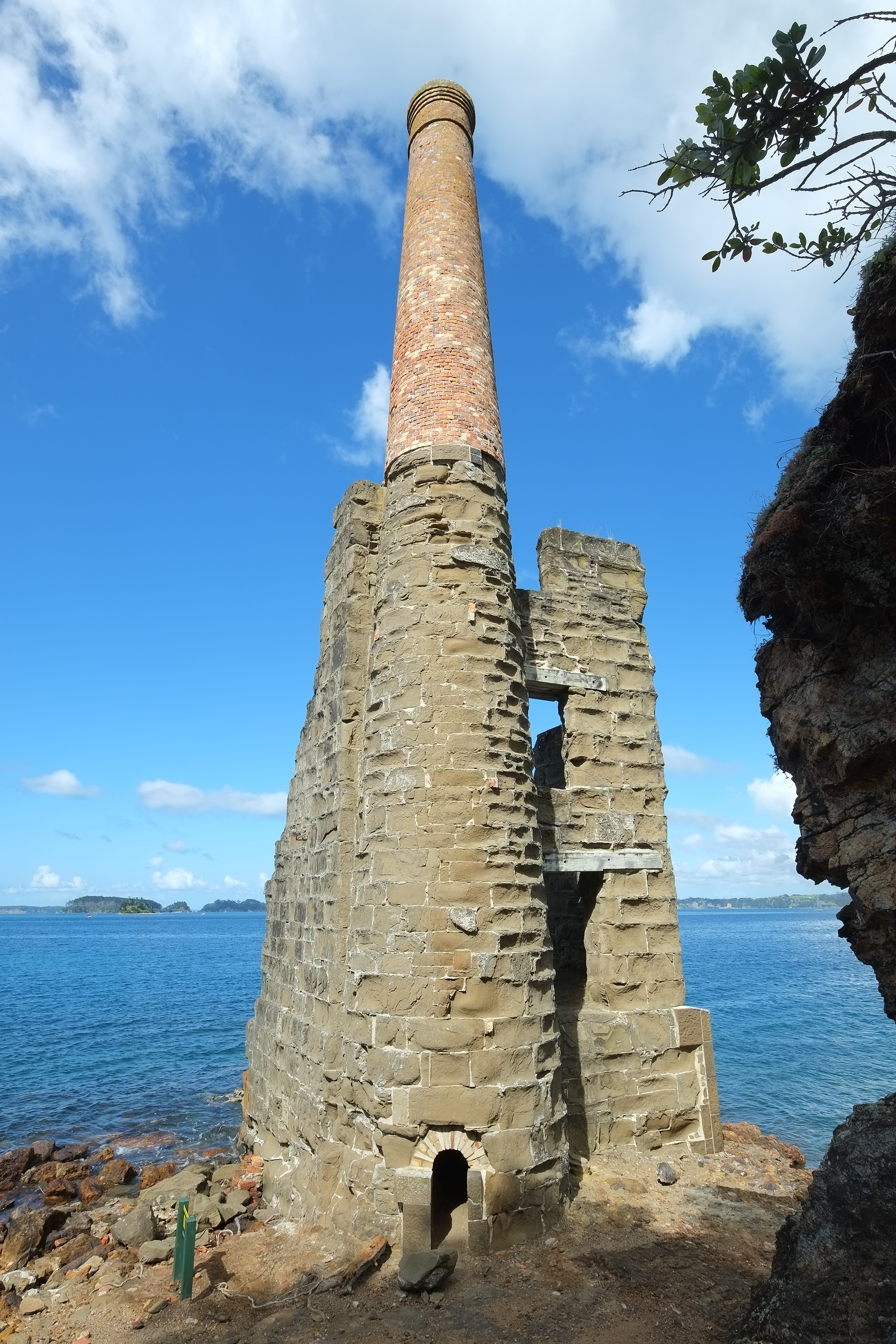
Close-up view of the Pumphouse ruins, seen in 2024
