= Mansion House, Kawau Island =

House on Kawau Island, New Zealand, owned by Governor Grey

Mansion House
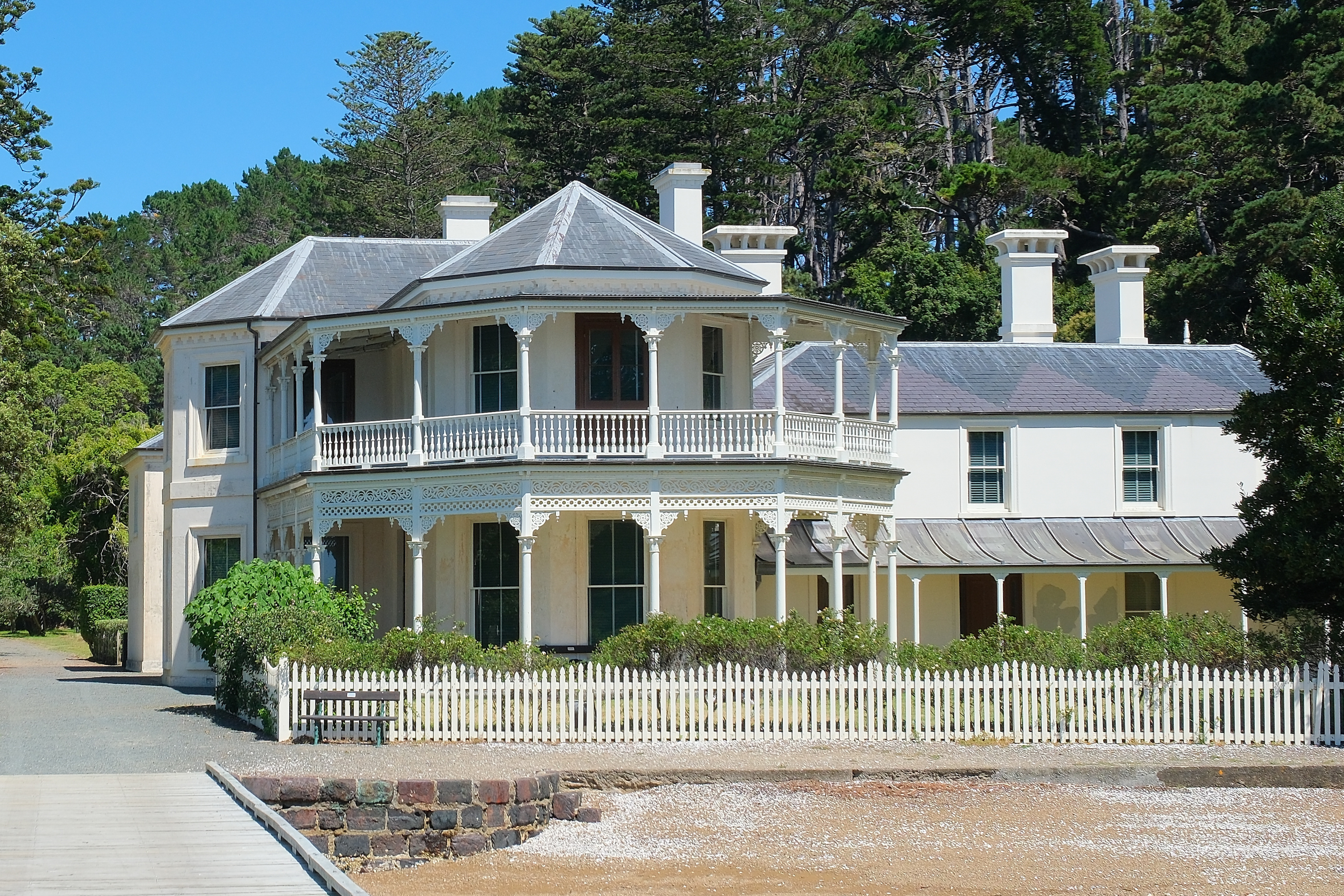
- Mansion House in 2024
- Interactive map of the Mansion House area

General information
- Architectural style: Georgian
- Location: Mansion House Bay; Kawau Island; New Zealand
- Coordinates: 36°25′49.70″S 174°49′7.27″E
- Completed: 1845
- Renovated: 1862–1867, 1977

Design and construction
- Architect: Frederick Thatcher

Heritage New Zealand – Category 1
- Designated: 23 June 1983
- Reference no.: 8

Mansion House on Kawau Island, New Zealand, is a house that was owned by Sir George Grey from 1862 to 1888. Built in 1845 as the house for the manager of a copper mine on the island, it was extended significantly by Grey during his ownership. Mansion House is a heritage listed building. It is open to the public as part of the Kawau Island Historic Reserve administered by the Department of Conservation.

== Background ==
Kawau Island is in the Hauraki Gulf, about 60 kilometres (37 mi) from Auckland. It was occupied by Māori up until sometime in the 19th century and in 1839 was purchased by a land company intending to avail itself of the island's timber. In 1844, copper deposits were discovered and mining infrastructure was quickly established. However, the efforts to extract the copper was plagued with flooding of mine shafts and workers left to go gold mining in Australia. The copper mine on Kawau Island closed in 1855, after around 3,000 tonnes (3,000 long tons; 3,300 short tons) had been extracted. The island was put up for sale in 1862 at which time Sir George Grey, newly commencing a second term as Governor of New Zealand, purchased it for £3,500.

== Mansion House ==
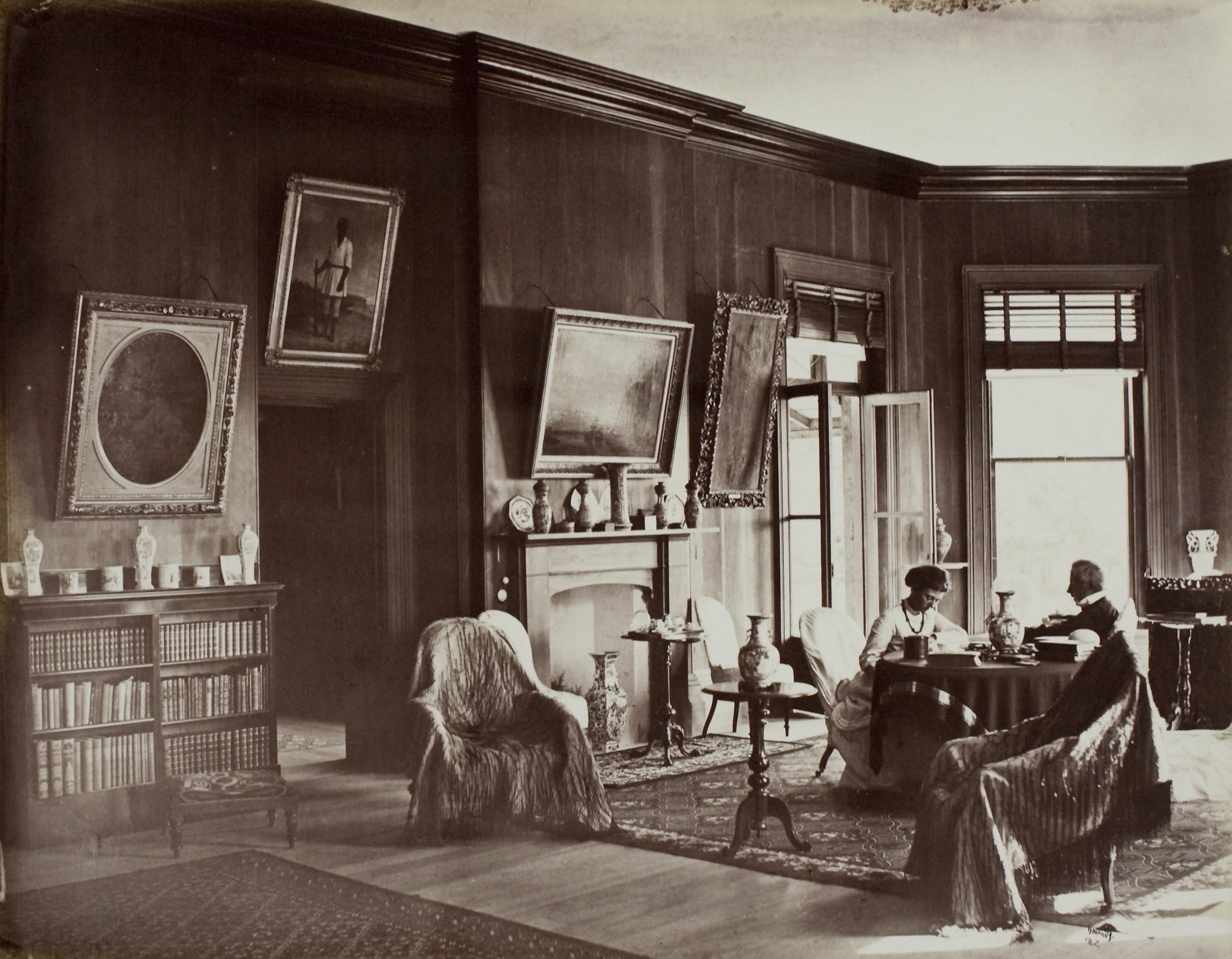
Grey and his niece in one of the rooms of Mansion House, around 1870–71

In 1845, the manager of the mine, Captain James Ninnis, had a two level brick dwelling of 11 rooms built at Momona Bay (what is now called Mansion House Bay). When Grey purchased the island, he was impressed with the building, commenting favourably on its thick walls, kauri timber and surrounding landscape. He contracted the architect Frederick Thatcher to extend the house with additional bedrooms, as well as dining and drawing rooms. Thatcher maintained the original Georgian style of the house, designing a new wing with an elongate verandah and bay window. The work was completed by an Auckland builder for £5,000.

Grey lived in the house from 1870 to 1874 and then used it as a getaway. For much of this time, his niece also resided at Mansion House and many notable persons of the period visited Grey at Mansion House. He spent extravagantly on the property, filling the house with artifacts from around the world and importing rare plant and animal species for his gardens. The original jetty leading to the property, built in 1844, was replaced with the current structure in 1875. It is likely to be the oldest surviving jetty in New Zealand. In 1888, his health now in decline, Grey sold the island. The new owners added the distinctive verandahs, designed by the architect Robert Watt, to the front face of the house and by 1901, it had become known as Mansion House.

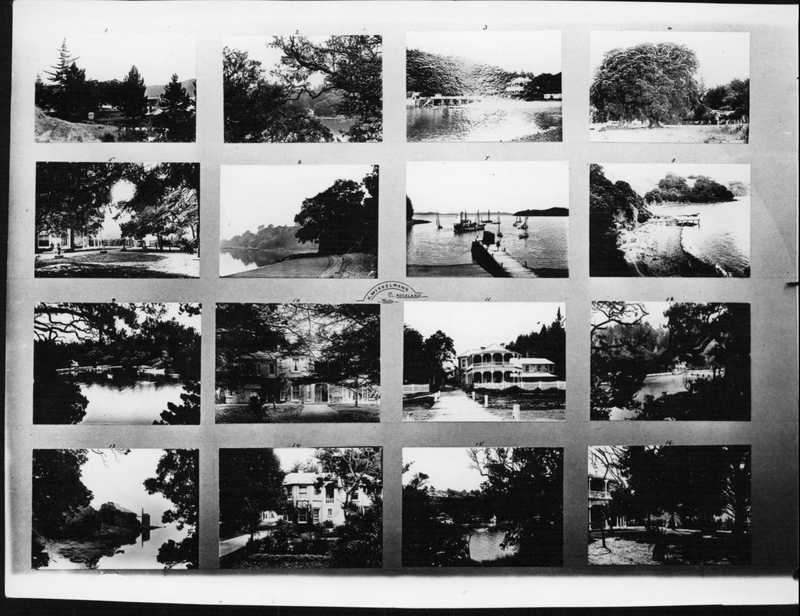
16 images of Mansion House Bay taken by Henry Winkelmann, circa 1900

Over the next several decades, much of the surrounding land was subdivided and the house itself had several owners. In 1901, the house was redeveloped by a group of investors including photographer Henry Winkelmann, who marketed the house as lodgings under the name Kawau Boarding House. Winkelmann extensively photographed the house and surrounding property in 1901 as a part of this venture, and sold his stake in 1904. The island was a popular destination for tourists and day trippers from Auckland and for much of this time, Mansion House was operated as a hotel.

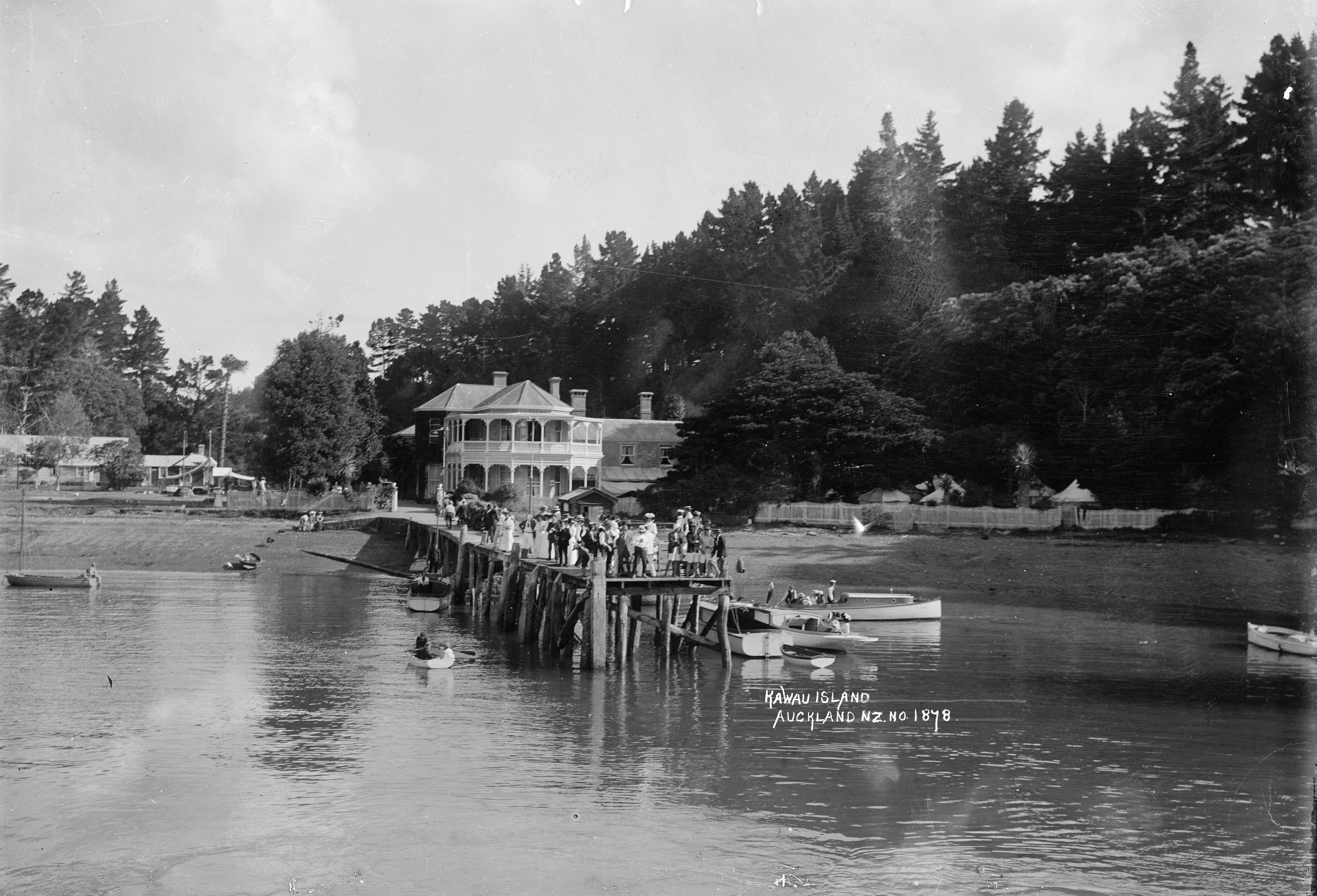
View of Mansion House, as it appeared in the early 1900s, on the approach to Mansion House Bay

In 1967, the last owner sold the house and surrounding land to the New Zealand Government so that it may be included in the newly established Hauraki Gulf Maritime Park. Mansion House continued to be operated as a hotel under a lease and was subject to some alterations that were not in keeping with the character of the building. In 1977, the lease was surrendered and the house underwent extensive renovations to bring it back to how it appeared in the 1890s. This included the removal of an extension added by one of the later owners of the house, despite requests from the locals to leave it in place. Furnished and decorated with loaned or donated period pieces, Mansion House was opened to the public in October 1979.

Mansion House was registered by the New Zealand Historic Places Trust (now called Heritage New Zealand) on 23 June 1983 and has registration number 8. The building has a category I listing. Originally administered by the Hauraki Gulf Maritime Park Board, it is now the responsibility of the Department of Conservation as part of the Kawau Island Historic Reserve.
