= Alice A. Leigh =

Four-masted ship in New Zealand, 1889–1922

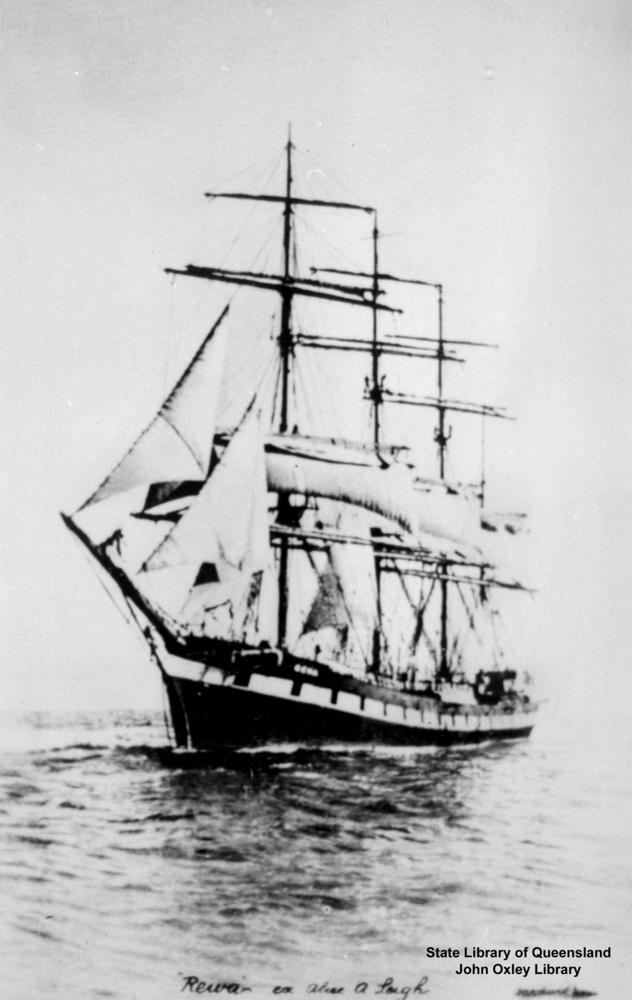
- Alice A. Leigh (Rewa)

History

United Kingdom, New Zealand
- Name: Alice A. Leigh
- Namesake: Mayoress of Stockport
- Owner: 1889–1899 John Joyce and Co.; 1899–1917 Galgate Shipping Co.; 1917–1920 New York & Pacific Sailing Co.; 1920–1930 George H. Scales Pacific Co.; 1930 Charles Percy Hanson
- Builder: Whitehaven Ship Building Co.
- Yard number: 75
- Launched: Whitehaven, Cumbria 1889
- Christened: Alice A. Leigh
- Completed: 1889
- Out of service: 1922
- Renamed: Rewa
- Fate: Beached, 1931

General characteristics
- Type: Barque
- Tonnage: 2999 grt / 2817 nrt
- Displacement: 2,999 t
- Length: 309 ft (94 m)
- Beam: 8.83 ft (2.69 m)
- Draught: 26 ft (7.9 m)
- Depth: 25.2 ft (7.7 m)

Alice A. Leigh (Rewa) was a four-masted steel barque built in Whitehaven in 1889 and was the largest ship on the British register at the time. She was renamed Rewa in 1920, following her purchase by a New Zealand shipping company. Rewa was beached in 1931 at a cove on Moturekareka island, near Martins Bay, Auckland.

== History ==
Alice A. Leigh was built in Whitehaven, England, in 1889 by Whitehaven Ship Building Company for her original owner John Joyce and Company. She had 31 sails and cost £25,943. She was the largest sailing ship ever built in Cumberland, and the second to last major sailing ship built in the region.

=== Merchant Marine ===
==== Launch ====
During her launch in August 1889, Alice stalled halfway on the slipway, taking four days to properly place her in the water. Multiple workers were badly injured in the process; a caulker became concussed, a riveter was whacked in the head and another worker lost part of his finger. She was christened by Alice A. Leigh, her namesake, the following month in September. Alice was the wife of Joseph Leigh, the Mayor of Stockport at the time, who was a prominent shareholder in John Joyce and Co.

From her launch to 1899, she served as a merchant ship registered and operated out of Liverpool, carrying cargo between Europe, Asia, the Americas and Oceania.

==== The Davison family & WWI ====
The same year, Alice's third captain, Allan Davison, moved onto the ship with his wife Hannah Davison. The couple spent almost 20 years (1899–1918) living on board, sailing the seas as merchants for Galgate Shipping Company, who had bought the ship. Hannah gave birth to all six of her children aboard, naming their firstborn Alice in 1902 in honour of the barque.

The Davison family had many adventures and close calls during their time on Alice, including a minor mutiny in 1904 and surviving a major storm off Cape Horn that left them with no food and water. During the First World War, they also had two close encounters with German submarines. During an Atlantic Ocean crossing in 1915, they came across a German U Boat suspecting Alice of carrying ammunition and ordered the whole crew to evacuate. Just before they were about to torpedo her, a French destroyer appeared and the U boat resubmerged. The following year, Alice was nearly sunk again in the Mediterranean Sea by the notoriously dangerous German U-35.

==== Wool trade ====
Towards the end of the war, Alice was sold to New York and Pacific Sailing Ship Company in 1917. Her time with this company was brief, as she was sold again to the wool mercantile company George H. Scales Pacific Ltd. in 1920. Based out of Wellington, New Zealand, Alice was renamed Rewa, as was common for New Zealand merchant ships of the time to be given Māori names. Under Scales Pacific Company, she transported wool between New Zealand and Europe. By this time however Rewa was outcompeted by steamships, and her final merchant voyage departed from London in late 1921, arriving in Auckland in August 1922. That December, the Auckland Harbour Board ordered Rewa to be moored in a harbour, and she was removed to Chelsea Wharf where she remained berthed and slowly deteriorating for eight years.

=== Shipwreck ===
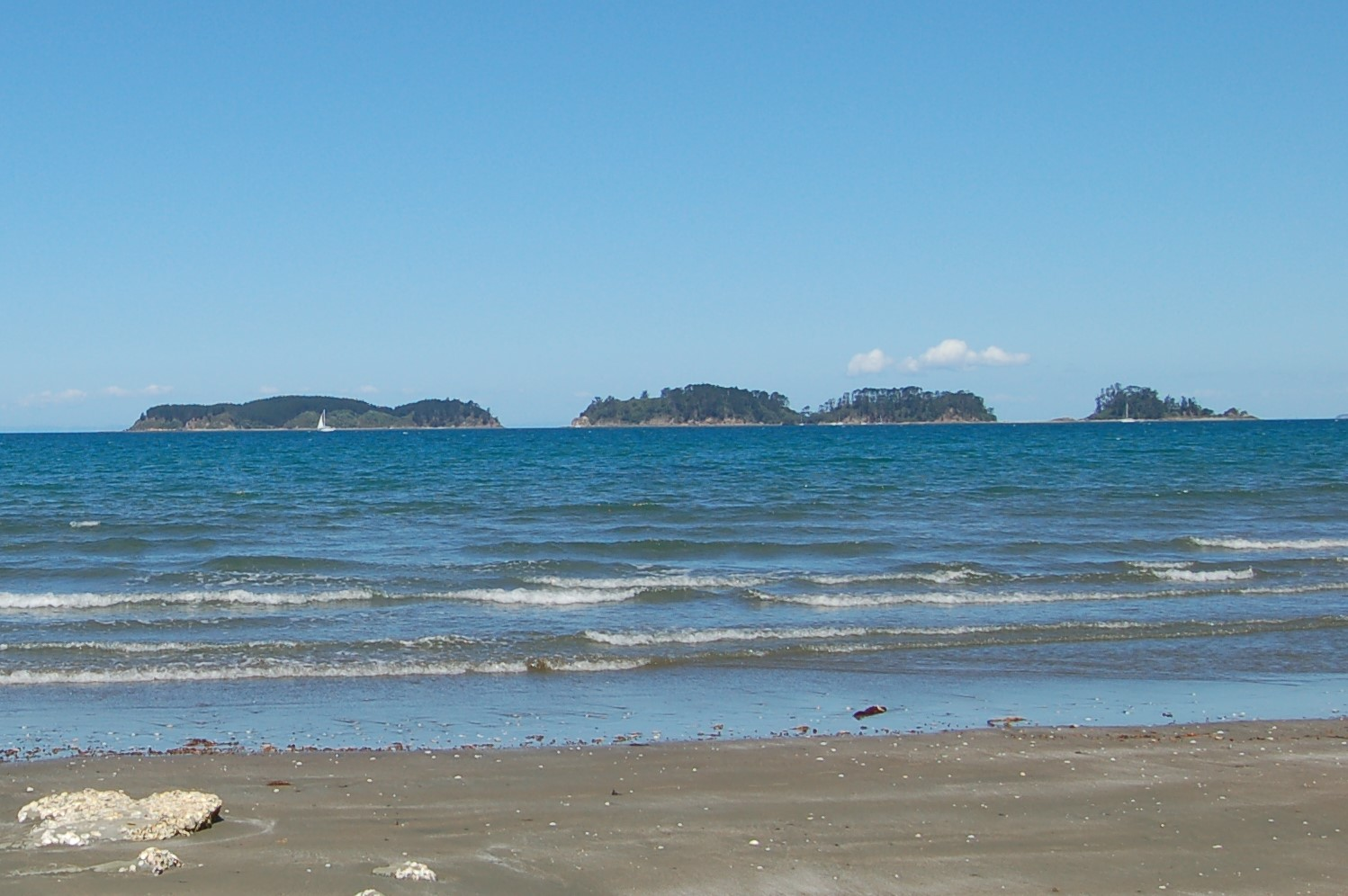
View of Moturekareka Island (centre) from Martins Bay

In 1930, Rewa was proposed to be refitted as a training vessel for the New Zealand Mercantile Marine when she was bought for £800 by Boer and First World War veteran Charles Percy Hansen. The owner of Moturekareka island, Hansen bought the ship most likely to use as a breakwater for the cove outside his house on the island, although rumours circulated that he was affiliated with a 'local syndicate' and intended to turn Rewa into an offshore drinking and gambling establishment. In 1931, she was pulled by the steam tug Te Awhina to Moturekareka island with the intention of being partially scuttled upright on a sandbank in the cove. Due to a storm however, she accidentally listed and ended up beached on the sandbank with her stern fully engulfed in water. Hansen built his home with parts salvaged from the wreck, and eventually Rewa was stripped down to just her gunwale.

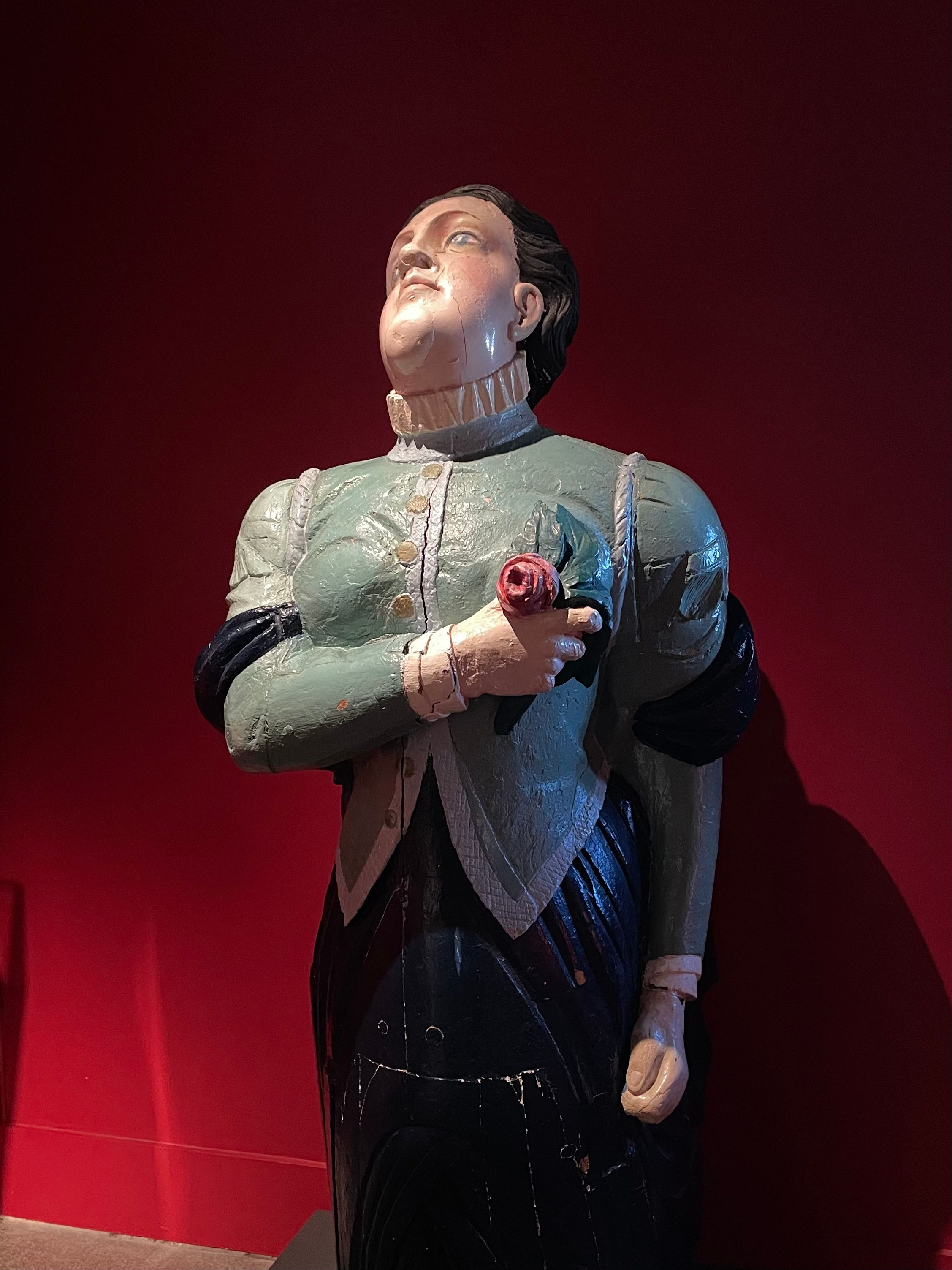
Alice ship's figure head on display at New Zealand Maritime Museum

== Surviving artefacts ==
Rewa remains sunk off of Moturekareka island, and what is left of her hull can be seen peaking above water at both high and low tides. She has become a popular visitor site for boating, kayaking, diving and snorkeling.

The ship's figurehead, a model of her namesake Mayoress Alice A. Leigh, is on display at Hui Te Ananui A Tangaroa the New Zealand Maritime Museum in the Edminston Gallery. The museum's collection also holds Allan and Hannah Davison's respective logbook and scrapbook from their time onboard Alice (Rewa).

== See also ==
- List of shipwrecks of Oceania
