= Kawau Island =

Island in the Hauraki Gulf, in Auckland, New Zealand

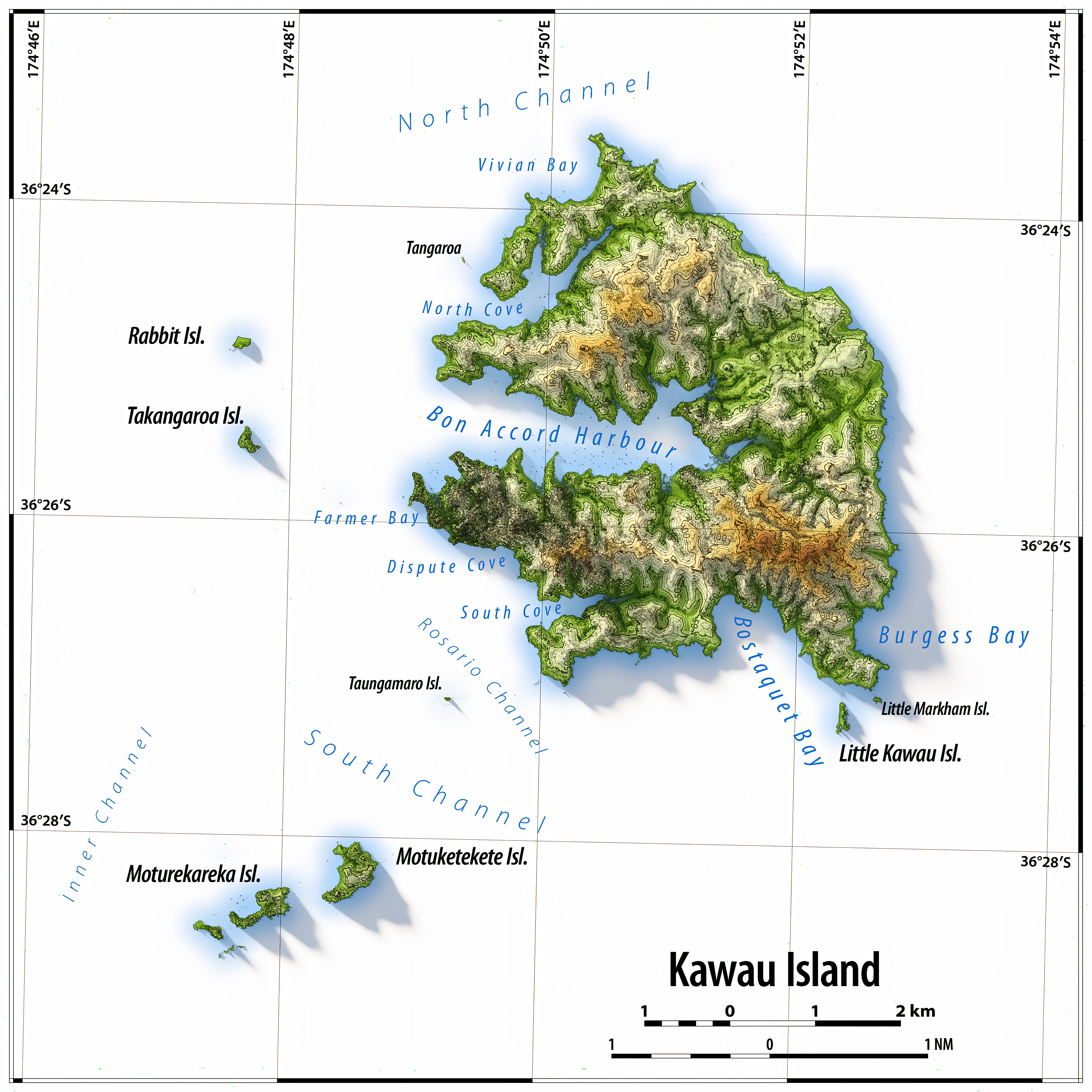
- Map of Kawau Island

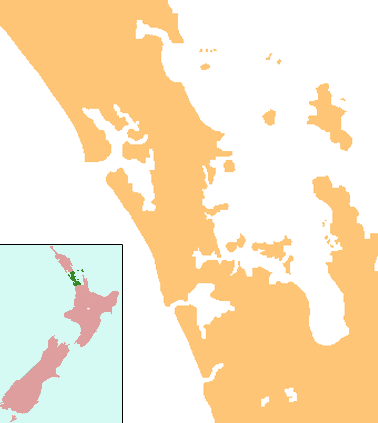
- Location within New Zealand Auckland

Geography
- Coordinates: 36.4232163°S 174.8472404°E
- Length: 8 km (5 mi)
- Width: 5 km (3.1 mi)
- Highest elevation: 182 m (597 ft)
- Highest point: Grey Heights

Administration
- New Zealand

Demographics
- Population: 100 (June 2025)

Kawau Island is in the Hauraki Gulf, close to the north-eastern coast of the North Island of New Zealand. It is named after the Māori word for the shag. At its closest point it lies 1.4 km (0.87 mi) off the coast of the Northland Peninsula, just south of Tāwharanui Peninsula, and about 8 km (5.0 mi) by sea journey from Sandspit Wharf, and shelters Kawau Bay to the north-east of Warkworth. It is 40 km (25 mi) north of Auckland.

Almost every property on the island relies on direct access to the sea. There are only two short roads serving settlements at Schoolhouse Bay and South Cove, and most residents have private wharves for access to their front door steps. A regular ferry service operates to the island from Sandspit Wharf on the mainland, as do water taxi services. Mansion House, in the Kawau Island Historic Reserve, is an important historic tourist attraction.

== Geography ==
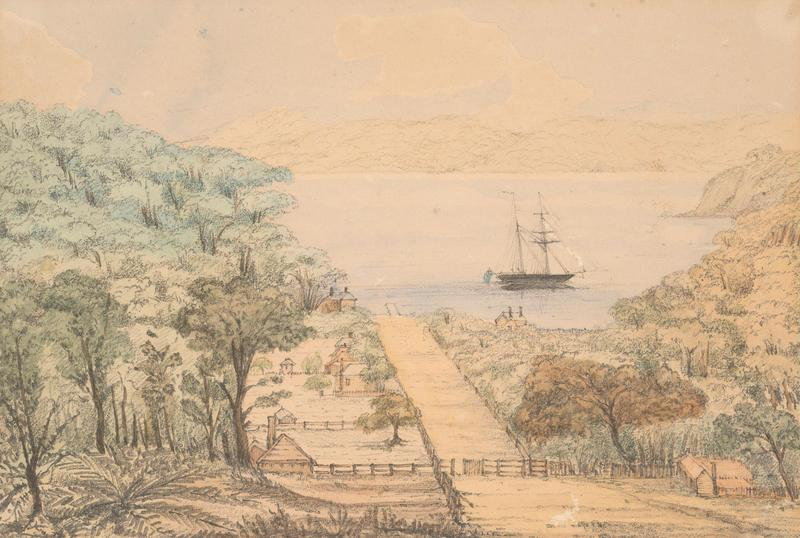
A watercolour of Momona Bay (now known as Bon Accord Harbour) circa 1851

The island is 8 by 5 km (5.0 by 3.1 mi) at its longest axes, and is almost bisected by the long inlet of Bon Accord Harbour, which is geologically a drowned valley. For more than a century, the sheltered location of the bay has made it a favourite stopping place for yachts.

The island is composed primarily of greywacke rocks and small lava flows, which formed on the sea floor before the island was uplifted by tectonic forces. Many of the lava flows were associated with hydrothermal springs, which precipitated metal sulphides and minerals rich in iron, manganese and copper.

Approximately 17,000 years ago, during the Last Glacial Maximum, when sea levels were over 100 metres lower than at present, Kawau Island was connected to the North Island, and surrounded by a vast coastal plain where the Hauraki Gulf exists today. Sea levels began to rise 7,000 years ago, after which Kawau became an island, separated from the rest of New Zealand.

== History ==
Kawau, though providing little arable land, was well-favoured by Māori for its beautiful surrounding waters, with battles over the island common from the 17th century on. Traditional stories involve the ancestor Toi-te-huatahi naming the island Te Kawau Tu Maro, meaning the shag (cormorant) standing watch. Kawau was occupied for generations by Tāmaki Māori tribes including Te Kawerau and Ngāi Tai. A defensive pā, Momona, is found on the island, located in the south-west along the ridge close to modern-day Mansion House.

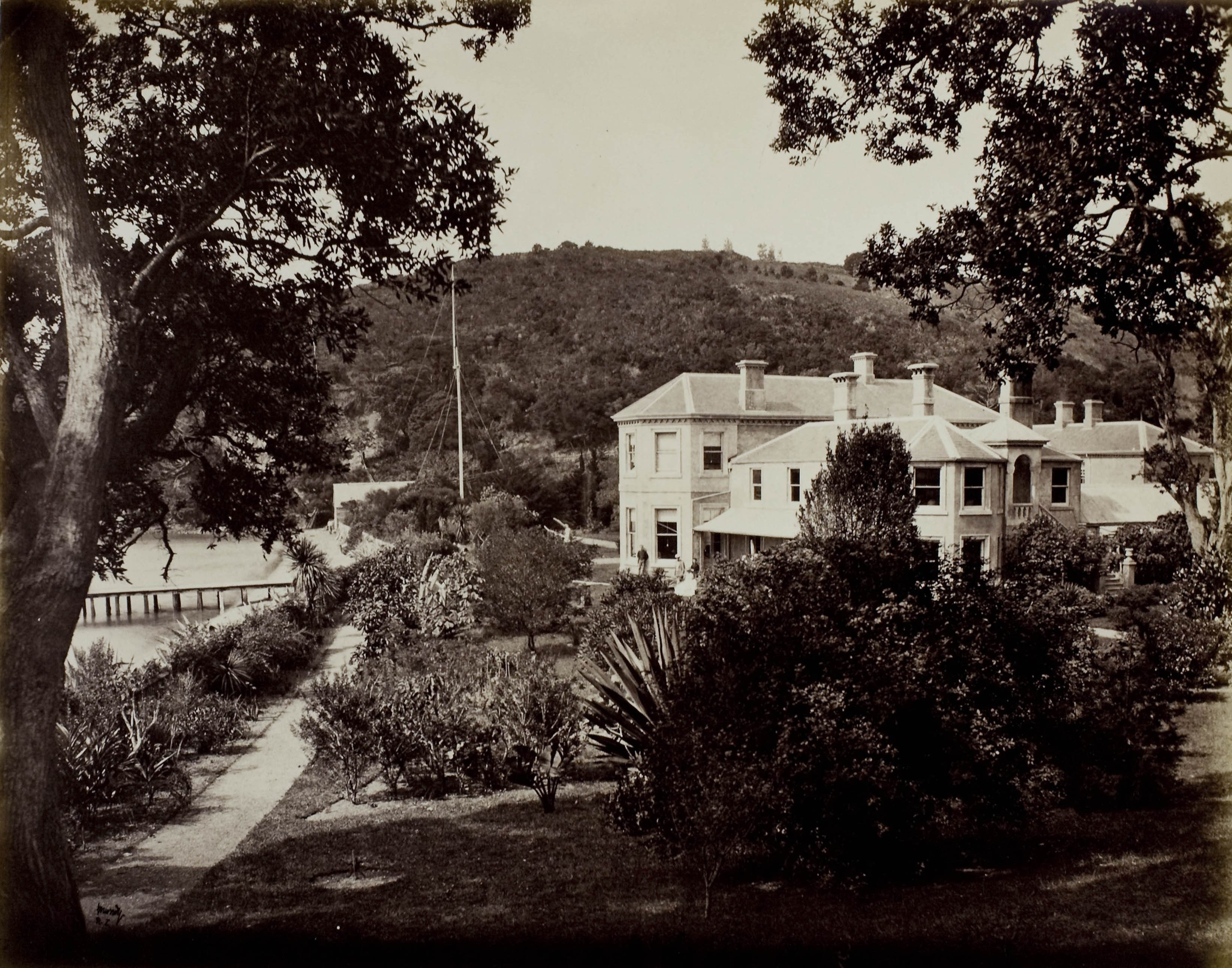
View of Mansion House and garden, circa 1870

Entrepreneurs from New South Wales purchased the island in 1840 and, shortly afterwards, James Forbes Beattie formed the Kawau Company, intending to mine copper on the island. Miners from Falmouth, Cornwall were brought over for the operation. After it was discovered that unsmelted ore was a fire hazard for ships, smelters from Wales were employed to run an ore-smelting operation on the island.

A rival company, funded by Frederick Whitaker and Theophilus Heale, was granted land immediately outside of the Kawau Company's land grant, giving them control of the wharf. The rival company created shafts underneath the Kawau Company's land, which led to a confrontation when miners from the Kawau Company broke into the rival company's heading. In 1846, the rival company's grant was rejected, and the Kawau Company took full possession of the mines in 1848. In 1844/45, the island produced about 7,000 pounds (3,200 kg) of copper, which was about a third of Auckland's exports for that year.

In 1862, the island was bought by Sir George Grey, Governor of New Zealand, to be used as a private retreat. Grey extended the original copper mine manager's house, built in 1845, to create the Mansion House, which still stands, and made the surrounding land into a botanical and zoological park, importing many plants and animals. The house changed hands several times after Grey, and fell into disrepair, but has been restored and furnished to its state during Grey's time. It is now in public ownership in the Kawau Island Historic Reserve, administered by the New Zealand Department of Conservation.

Governor Grey introduced possums to Kawau in 1868–69. The serious threat they posed to New Zealand's indigenous forest was first identified on Kawau by Ray Weaver in 1955. Since then, possums have become a major animal pest in New Zealand, compromising both forest health and the country's primary industries. The first liberation in New Zealand proper is believed to have been by Captain Howell at Riverton in the South Island in 1837.

The reserve is public land and covers 10% of the Island, and includes the old copper mine, believed to be the site of New Zealand's first underground metalliferous mining venture. The ruins of the mine's pumphouse are registered as a Category I heritage structure.

In 1968, the island was annexed by Rodney County.

The island is home to kiwis and two-thirds of the entire population of North Island weka. Among the animals that Grey introduced were five species of wallabies, as well as kookaburras. Three of the six introduced wallaby species remain and do considerable damage to the native vegetation, thus harming the habitat for the flightless birds and other native fauna. The wallabies destroy emerging seedlings which means that the present native trees are the last generation. The usual under-storey forest species are absent due to wallaby browsing and, in many cases, the ground is bare. Possums, also introduced from Australia by Grey, destroy mature native trees. The result has been a considerable loss of biodiversity, with bird numbers plummeting due to shortages of both food supply and suitable habitat. Even the surrounding marine environment has been severely compromised by silt carried from the bare ground by rainwater.

However, Grey's introduction of wallabies eventually had a minor indirect benefit in the early 2000s, when some were taken to Australia's Innes National Park to boost genetic diversity.

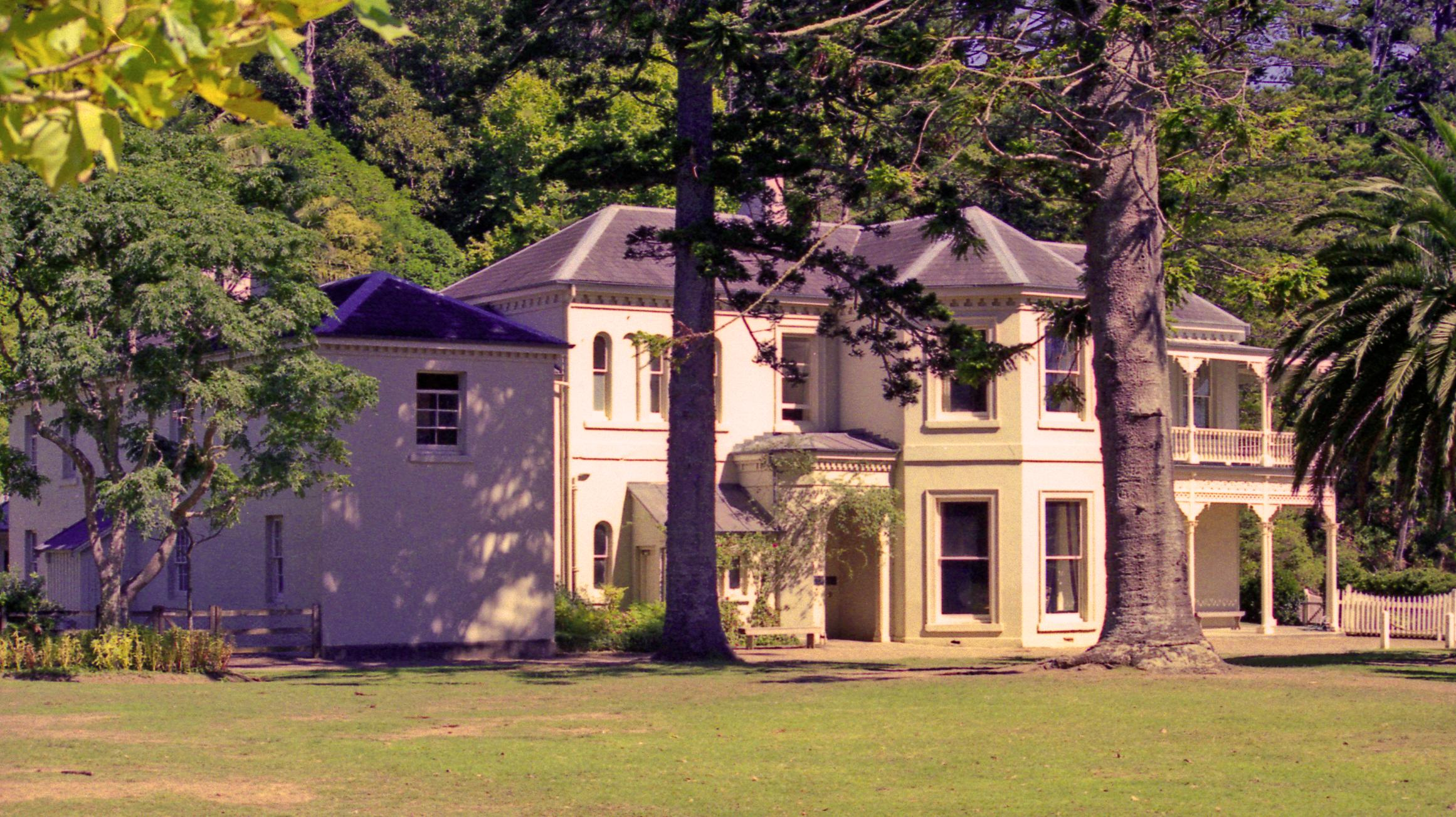
Mansion House, July 2006

=== Department of Conservation controlled land ===
About 10% of the island is under the control of the Department of Conservation, which tries to keep the protected areas free of invasive pests and animals. As at 2002, Kawau Island was home to the largest island population of North Island weka.

== Demographics ==
Statistics New Zealand describes Kawau Island as a rural settlement which covers 21.57 km^{2} (8.33 sq mi) and includes Motuora, Moturekareka Island, Motuketekete Island, Takangaroa Island and Rabbit Island, all of which are uninhabited. It had an estimated population of 100 as of June 2025, with a population density of 4.6 people per km^{2}. The area is part of the larger Gulf Islands statistical area.

Historical population for Kawau Island
| Year | Pop. | ±% p.a. |
|---|---|---|
| 2006 | 81 | — |
| 2013 | 78 | −0.54% |
| 2018 | 81 | +0.76% |
| 2023 | 96 | +3.46% |

Kawau Island had a population of 96 in the 2023 New Zealand census, an increase of 15 people (18.5%) since the 2018 census, and an increase of 18 people (23.1%) since the 2013 census. There were 54 males and 45 females in 60 dwellings. 3.1% of people identified as LGBTIQ+. The median age was 62.6 years (compared with 38.1 years nationally). There were 6 people (6.2%) aged under 15 years, 6 (6.2%) aged 15 to 29, 39 (40.6%) aged 30 to 64, and 45 (46.9%) aged 65 or older.

People could identify as more than one ethnicity. The results were 87.5% European (Pākehā); 12.5% Māori; and 3.1% Middle Eastern, Latin American and African New Zealanders (MELAA). English was spoken by 100.0%, Māori language by 3.1%, and other languages by 9.4%. The percentage of people born overseas was 21.9, compared with 28.8% nationally.

Religious affiliations were 28.1% Christian, and 3.1% New Age. People who answered that they had no religion were 62.5%, and 3.1% of people did not answer the census question.

Of those at least 15 years old, 12 (13.3%) people had a bachelor's or higher degree, 54 (60.0%) had a post-high school certificate or diploma, and 18 (20.0%) people exclusively held high school qualifications. The median income was $25,100, compared with $41,500 nationally. 9 people (10.0%) earned over $100,000 compared to 12.1% nationally. The employment status of those aged at least 15 was that 27 (30.0%) people were employed full-time and 15 (16.7%) were part-time.

=== Gulf Islands ===
The statistical area of Gulf Islands also includes Rangitoto Island, Motutapu Island, Browns Island, Motuihe Island and Rakino Island, but Kawau Island has the majority of the population. Gulf Islands covers 66.11 km^{2} (25.53 sq mi) and had an estimated population of 140 as of June 2025, with a population density of 2.1 people per km^{2}.

Historical population for Gulf Islands
| Year | Pop. | ±% p.a. |
|---|---|---|
| 2006 | 141 | — |
| 2013 | 120 | −2.28% |
| 2018 | 111 | −1.55% |
| 2023 | 138 | +4.45% |

Gulf Islands had a population of 138 in the 2023 New Zealand census, an increase of 27 people (24.3%) since the 2018 census, and an increase of 18 people (15.0%) since the 2013 census. There were 72 males and 66 females in 99 dwellings. 4.3% of people identified as LGBTIQ+. The median age was 62.6 years (compared with 38.1 years nationally). There were 6 people (4.3%) aged under 15 years, 12 (8.7%) aged 15 to 29, 60 (43.5%) aged 30 to 64, and 60 (43.5%) aged 65 or older.

People could identify as more than one ethnicity. The results were 89.1% European (Pākehā); 13.0% Māori; 4.3% Pasifika; and 2.2% Middle Eastern, Latin American and African New Zealanders (MELAA). English was spoken by 100.0%, Māori language by 2.2%, and other languages by 10.9%. The percentage of people born overseas was 23.9, compared with 28.8% nationally.

Religious affiliations were 26.1% Christian, and 2.2% New Age. People who answered that they had no religion were 65.2%, and 6.5% of people did not answer the census question.

Of those at least 15 years old, 27 (20.5%) people had a bachelor's or higher degree, 69 (52.3%) had a post-high school certificate or diploma, and 30 (22.7%) people exclusively held high school qualifications. The median income was $26,600, compared with $41,500 nationally. 12 people (9.1%) earned over $100,000 compared to 12.1% nationally. The employment status of those aged at least 15 was that 39 (29.5%) people were employed full-time and 27 (20.5%) were part-time.

== See also ==
- List of islands of New Zealand
- Moturekareka Island
