= Motuketekete Island =

Island in the Hauraki Gulf, New Zealand

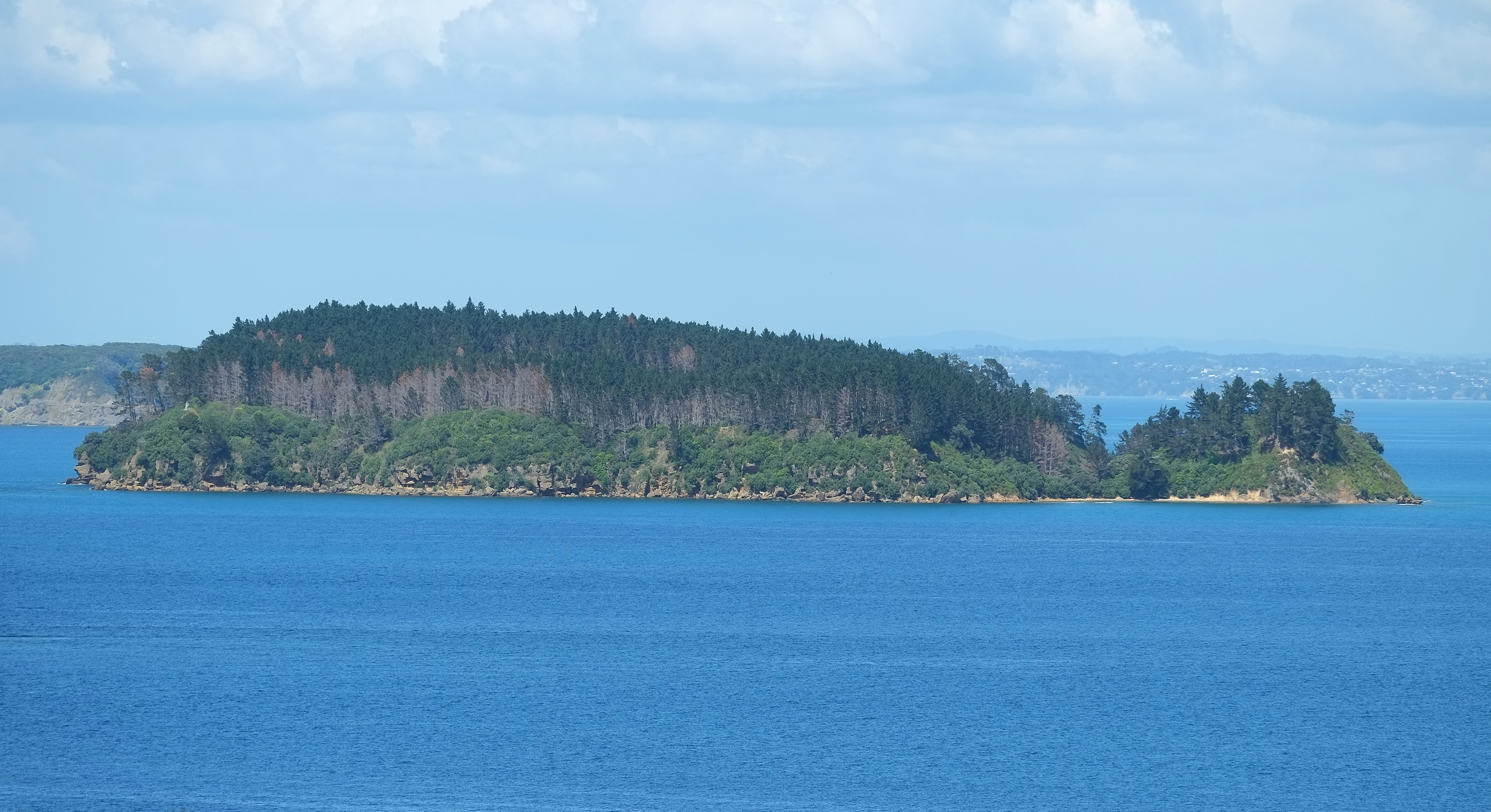
- Motuketekete seen from Kawau Island

- Location within New Zealand

Geography
- Location: Hauraki Gulf, Auckland Region
- Coordinates: 36°28′13″S 174°48′35″E
- Area: 0.23 km^{2} (0.089 sq mi)
- Length: 0.78 km (0.485 mi)
- Width: 0.55 km (0.342 mi)
- Highest elevation: 54 m (177 ft)

Administration
- New Zealand

Demographics
- Population: 0

Motuketekete Island is an uninhabited island in the northern Hauraki Gulf, off the northeastern coast of New Zealand's North Island. It is separated from Moturekareka Island to the west by the Blanche Channel.

== History ==
The island was purchased by John Long Haydon, along with nearby Moturekareka, and Motuora in March 1845 from Ngāti Pāoa chief Te Ruinga and members of Ngāti Rongo. A copper mine was established on the island, similar to the copper mines found on nearby Kawau Island. However, by 1847 the mine had failed due to flooding. The New Zealand Land Commission ruled in 1848 that Motuketekete was a part of the Mahurangi and Omaha Purchase, and compensated Haydon for the purchase. Scottish sheep farmer Charlie P. Hansen purchased Moturekareka, Motutara, Kohatutara and Motuketekete in the early 1920s, living on Motuketekete until the late 1920s.

== Geography ==
The island is located around 3 kilometres (1.9 mi) southwest of Kawau Island, separated by the Rosario and South Channels. Motuketekete is 365 metres (399 yd) north-east of Moturekareka Island, separated by the Blanche Channel. Motuora is about 2.7 kilometres (1.7 mi) south of Motuketekete.

== Environment ==
Feral guinea pigs lived on the island in the mid-20th century, but these had been wiped out by 1982.
