= Moturoa Island =

Moturoa Island may refer to one of several islands in New Zealand. Motu roa is Māori for long island. These islands include:

- Moturoa Island (Bay of Islands) in the Northland Region of New Zealand
- Moturoa (island) off the coast of New Plymouth, New Zealand
- Moturoa / Rabbit Island on the northern coast of New Zealand's South Island.
