= Downard =

Downard is a surname. Notable people with the surname include:

- Alison Downard, New Zealand academic
- Axel Downard-Wilke (born 1966), New Zealand transport planner and Wikipedian
- James Shelby Downard (1913–1998), American conspiracy theorist
- Kelly Downard, American politician
- Kevin Downard, Australian scientist
- Ryan Downard (born 1988), American football coach and player
