= Jean Thompson =

Jean Thompson may refer to:

- Jean Kasem (née Thompson, born 1954), American actress
- Jean Thompson (author) (born 1950), American author
- C. Jean Thompson (born 1940), New Zealand statistician
- Jean Thompson (athlete) (1910–1976), Canadian middle-distance runner
- Jean Helen Thompson (1926–1992), British statistician and demographer
