= Brenda Shore =

New Zealand botanist (1922–1993)

- Born: Brenda Faulkner Slade; 30 November 1922; Auckland
- Died: 18 June 1993 (aged 70)
- Known for: Studies of leaf venation
- Scientific career
- Thesis: Development of dicotyledonous leaves with special reference to their venation (1954)
- Doctoral advisor: E. J. H. Corner
- Other academic advisors: Geoff Baylis

Brenda Faulkner Shore (née Slade, 30 November 1922 – 18 June 1993) was a New Zealand botanist who attained the rank of Associate Professor before she retired in 1983.

== Early life and education ==
Shore was born in Auckland on 30 November 1922 to parents the Reverend Dr William Slade and Mary Eizabeth Wilhemina Slade née Faulkner. She attended primary school in Napier, and was at school when the 1931 Hawke's Bay earthquake hit, and watched the school's buildings collapse. Shore attended Wellington East Girls' College from 1936–1938, and then Epsom Girls' Grammar School from 1938–1940. In 1940, Shore was awarded the Cheeseman Memorial Prize, a nationally-awarded prize for a botanical project by a secondary school pupil, for a diary project describing the bush and gardens in Pukekohe that included watercolour illustrations.

== University career ==
Brenda enrolled at Auckland University College in 1941, and then at the University of Otago in 1943, from where she graduated with a Bachelor of Science in 1945. In 1945 the Botany Department at Otago was staffed by an assistant lecturer and a professor. John Holloway, the head of department, became suddenly ill and was forced to retire, and the assistant lecturer, Ella Campbell, had already resigned to take a position at Massey University, leaving the department with no teaching staff. The new Head, Geoff Baylis had been appointed but was not released by the Navy until August. Shore and two other recent women botany graduates, Elizabeth Batham and Margaret Cookson, pitched in to keep botany classes running when Holloway was about to cancel all classes for the year. Batham and Cookson delivered the Stage II and III lectures using Holloway's notes, while Shore took all the Stage I lectures and practicals, and laid out the material for senior practicals, and Ann Wylie assisted.

Shore was appointed as Assistant Lecturer in botany in 1945. She graduated with an M.Sc. in botany in 1949 with a thesis entitled Comparative anatomy of the cladode in New Zealand brooms, in which she was supervised by Geoff Baylis.

In 1952 Shore was awarded a Fellowship by the Federation of University Women, the first member of the New Zealand branch to gain one. The fellowship allowed her to undertake postgraduate study at Cambridge University, where she enrolled at Newnham College and in 1954 completed a PhD entitled Development of dicotyledonous leaves with special reference to their venation. She worked under botanist E. J. H. Corner. Shore specialised in leaf development and researched the breeding systems of New Zealand plants.

Back in Dunedin, Shore was promoted to lecturer in 1955, senior lecturer in 1960 and associate professor in 1971. In 1961, Shore took a sabbatical at Duke University in North Carolina, having received a postdoctoral fellowship from the American Association of University Women and a Fulbright Fellowship to assist with travel expenses. At Duke she worked with Jane Philpott on leaf development and lectured on plant anatomy and morphogenesis.

At the time of her retirement in 1983, there were 370 University staff members across seven New Zealand universities at the level of Associate Professor or reader, but only 20 of them were women.

Shore also painted plants, and was an accomplished member of the Otago Art Society, holding a solo exhibition at Abernethy's Gallery in Dunedin in 1982. Shore's 1978 guide to identifying plants and trees around Otago was illustrated with many fine line-drawings by her.

Shore died on 18 June 1993.

== Legacy ==
When she retired in 1983, Shore arranged a scholarship, the Brenda Shore Award for Women, which is $15,000 awarded annually to support women with "passion and energy" for the natural sciences. The Shore family also established the Shore Trust, which supports botany research at the University. In 2017 Shore was selected as one of the Royal Society Te Apārangi's 150 women in 150 words.

== Selected works ==
- Brenda F. Slade (1952). "Cladode Anatomy and Leaf Trace Systems in New Zealand Brooms" (PDF). Transactions of the Royal Society of New Zealand. 80: 81–96. ISSN 0035-9181. Wikidata Q89183321.
- Brenda F Slade (1953). "Somatic Chromosome Number of the New Zealand Broom Genera and a Discussion of Their Relationship" (PDF). Transactions of the Royal Society of New Zealand. 81: 1–9. ISSN 0035-9181. Wikidata Q89183363.
- Brenda F. Slade (1957). "Leaf Development in Relation to Venation, as Shown in Cercis siliquastrum L., Prunus serrulata Lindl. and Acer pseudoplatanus L.". New Phytologist (in undetermined language). 56 (3): 281–300. ISSN 0028-646X. JSTOR 2429609. Wikidata Q105061517.
- Brenda F. Slade (1959), The Mode of Origin of Vein-Endings in the Leaf of Liriodendron tulipifera L. (in undetermined language), vol. 58, pp. 299–305, JSTOR 2429528, Wikidata Q105061519
- Slade, B.F. (1964). "Gametophytes of Equisetum fluviatile L. in agar culture". Phytomorphology: an international journal of plant morphology. 14: 315–319. ISSN 0031-9449. Wikidata Q105061609.
- Brenda F. Shore (July 1969). "Dioecism in New Zealand escalloniaceae". New Zealand Journal of Botany. 7 (2): 113–124. doi:10.1080/0028825x.1969.10429109. ISSN 0028-825X. Wikidata Q105061630.
- Brenda F. Slade (1970), The Effect of Cell Elongation on Leaf Anatomy of Poa alpina (in undetermined language), vol. 131, pp. 83–95, JSTOR 2473832, Wikidata Q105061520
- Brenda F. Slade (1971). "Stelar Evolution in Vascular Plants". New Phytologist (in undetermined language). 70 (5): 879–884. ISSN 0028-646X. JSTOR 2430764. Wikidata Q105061518.
- Brenda F. Shore (June 1978). "Breeding systems in Carpodetus serratus J.R. et G.Forst". New Zealand Journal of Botany. 16 (2): 179–184. doi:10.1080/0028825x.1978.10429676. ISSN 0028-825X. Wikidata Q105061635.
- Brenda F. Shore (1978), How to Identify Common N.Z. Trees & Shrubs in the Dunedin–Otago Area, Illustrator: Brenda Shore, Dunedin: Tūhura Otago Museum, Wikidata Q105064618
