= Kathleen Campbell (geologist) =

New Zealand geology and astrobiology academic

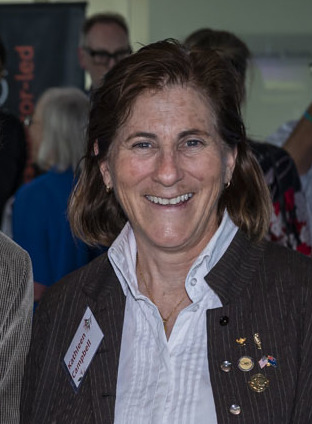
- Campbell in 2020
- Born: Kathleen Ann Campbell; California
- Other name: Stonehistorian
- Education: University of Southern California
- Scientific career
- Fields: cold seeps
- Workplaces: University of Auckland
- Thesis: Dynamic Development Of Jurassic-Pliocene Cold-Seeps, Convergent Margin Of Western North America (1995)

Kathleen Ann Campbell is an American-born New Zealand geology and astrobiology academic. She is currently a full professor at the University of Auckland. Her work is broadly centred in the topic of paleoecology and how ancient organisms interacted with their environment and whether they were capable of surviving under extremely hard conditions. Much of her research carries wide-ranged associations with questions about the origin of life and the possibility of life on Mars. She graduated from the University of Southern California and she is currently a full professor at the University of Auckland.

== Academic career ==
During Campbell's high school years she studied many fields including: English, French, Humanities, Biology, Chemistry and Math. She attended the University of California, Santa Cruz, where she earned a Bachelor of Science in Earth science. She earned a Master’s degree in geological sciences from the University of Washington, and a PhD in Geology at the University of Southern California. Shortly after a geology PhD at University of Southern California in the USA titled, 'Dynamic Development Of Jurassic-Pliocene Cold-Seeps, Convergent Margin Of Western North America' Campbell moved to the University of Auckland in New Zealand, eventually rising to full professor. In 1997, Campbell was appointed from a post-doctoral position in the Exobiology Branch at the NASA Ames Research Center into teaching and researching in the areas of paleoenvironment and paleoecology as a member of the Geology Department of the University of Auckland.

Campbell's research is on determining the link between life and its environment, particularly on the microscopic level and potentially on other planets. Becoming the head of the astrobiology research group in earth sciences, she has been able to delve deeper into her investigation through experimentation involving the activities of mineral and geothermal resources through observing gas hydrates and hydrocarbon seeps. She has also carried out experiments involving geo fluids and their effects on the planet’s life forms and crust which have contributed to the focal point of her research and to an improved understanding of the discovery of life on Mars. Within her research, she puts a specific emphasis on a subcategory within her main focus: life in extreme environments. In order to explore this she utilises trace fossils for indicators of ancient shorelines and sea level changes, sedimentology, and paragenesis.

In 2016 Campbell was elected Fellow of the Royal Society of New Zealand. In 2017, Campbell was selected as one of the Royal Society Te Apārangi's "150 women in 150 words", celebrating the contributions of women to knowledge in New Zealand.

Much of Campbell's most-cited research involves cold seeps.

== Awards and societies ==
- Senior Research Fellow (LE STUDIUM® – Institute for Advanced Studies, Orléans, France, 2014)
- Burbidge Lecturer (Auckland Astronomical Society, 2011)
- Hochstetter Lecturer (Geoscience Society of New Zealand, 2009)
- Charles Fleming Senior Scientist Award (Royal Society of New Zealand, 2009)
- Member of the Paleontological Society, Geoscience Society of New Zealand, Geological Society of America, and The Society for Sedimentary Geology

== Selected works ==
- Campbell, Kathleen A. "Hydrocarbon seep and hydrothermal vent paleoenvironments and paleontology: past developments and future research directions." Palaeogeography, Palaeoclimatology, Palaeoecology 232, no. 2-4 (2006): 362–407.
- Campbell, K. A., J. D. Farmer, and D. Des Marais. "Ancient hydrocarbon seeps from the Mesozoic convergent margin of California: carbonate geochemistry, fluids and palaeoenvironments." Geofluids 2, no. 2 (2002): 63–94.
- Herdianita, N. R., P. R. L. Browne, K. A. Rodgers, and K. A. Campbell. "Mineralogical and textural changes accompanying ageing of silica sinter." Mineralium deposita 35, no. 1 (2000): 48–62.
- Campbell, Kathleen A., and David J. Bottjer. "Brachiopods and chemosymbiotic bivalves in Phanerozoic hydrothermal vent and cold seep environments." Geology 23, no. 4 (1995): 321–324.
- Campbell, K. A. "Fossil cold seeps." National Geographic Research and Exploration 9 (1993): 326–343.
