= Flora Murray (botanist) =

New Zealand botanist (1896–1968)

- Born: Flora Buchan Murray; 1 August 1896; New Zealand
- Died: 1968 (age 72); Edinburgh, Scotland
- Resting place: Grange Cemetery, Edinburgh, Scotland
- Scientific career
- Fields: botany
- Institutions: Rangi Ruru Girls' School, Canterbury University College, Edinburgh University, Sunderland College
- Thesis: Studies in the development of the sexual tissues in the genus rhododendron (1932)

Flora Buchan Murray (1 August 1896 – 1968) was a New Zealand botanist, and was the second woman appointed as permanent staff at Canterbury University College.

== Early life and education ==
Flora Buchan Murray was born in New Zealand on 1 August 1896 to parents the Reverend Charles and Grace Jane Murray. She grew up in Carterton, near Wellington, and was educated at Christchurch Girls' High School. She enrolled at Canterbury University College in 1915, and was the winner of the prize in zoology for 1916–1917. Murray graduated with a Bachelor of Arts in 1920, and followed this with an MA with first class Honours in Botany in 1921. Her dissertation was on indigenous plants in the Port Hills.

== Academic career ==
Murray taught at Rangi Ruru Girls' School but was then appointed as an assistant lecturer in the Department of Biology at the Canterbury University College in 1922, under head Charles Chilton. She was the second woman to be appointed to the staff, and worked alongside the first, Elizabeth Herriott. Murray also worked as a research assistant in forestry.

In May 1929 Murray was awarded the Sir William Hartley Scholarship for three years' overseas study. She was awarded a doctorate in 1932 by the University of Edinburgh, for a dissertation entitled Studies in the development of the sexual tissues in the genus rhododendron. She appears to have worked both at the University of Edinburgh and at Sunderland College in the UK.

== Later life ==
Murray died in Edinburgh in 1968, and is buried in Grange cemetery with her sister Grace Bryce Murray. Her memorial mentions her PhD.

== Legacy ==
In 2017, Murray was selected as one of the Royal Society Te Aparangi's 150 women in 150 words, celebrating the contributions of women to knowledge in New Zealand.

== Selected work ==
- Flora Murray (1932), Studies in the development of the sexual tissues in the genus rhododendron, Wikidata Q105003335
