= Alva Challis =

Welsh-born New Zealand geologist (1930–2010)

- Born: Gwyneth Alva Challis; 25 January 1930
- Died: 21 November 2010 (aged 80); Nelson, New Zealand
- Education: University of Cambridge
- Spouse: Ross Lauder
- Scientific career
- Thesis: The petrology of the New Zealand ultramafic belt. (1963)

Gwyneth Alva Challis, known as Alva, (25 January 1930 – 21 November 2010) was a Welsh-born New Zealand geologist who discovered the mineral Wairauite, and pioneered the use of x-rays for mineral investigation in New Zealand.

== Life and work ==
Challis was born in Port Talbot, Wales, on 25 January 1930. In 1952, she emigrated with her parents to New Zealand, where she worked as a radiographer in Invercargill and Wellington. In 1958, Challis joined the Petrology Section of the New Zealand Geological Survey as a technician. She undertook a master's degree majoring in geology at Victoria University of Wellington, studying part-time, where in 1959 she won the Sir Robert Stout scholarship for best student. Her master's thesis was on the geology of the Mt Lookout area in Marlborough. She later said that one of her supervisors, Harold Wellman, "treated her like an honorary man", such that she was surprised when he brought another lecturer to act as chaperone on a visit to her in the field.

In 1961 Challis won a DSIR scholarship to Cambridge University, where she completed a PhD in geology in 1963, titled The petrology of the New Zealand ultramafic belt. During her PhD Challis used an electron microprobe analyser to determine the composition of very small mineral particles, and in so doing, discovered a new mineral. This was named Wairauite, after the Wairau Valley in Marlborough where Challis found it. Her PhD was the first geoscience doctorate by a New Zealand woman.

Also during her PhD, Challis met socially with one of her geology lecturers from Victoria University of Wellington, Ross Lauder. Lauder and Challis were married in 1963 in Wellington. The couple worked together on deep-seated rock deposits with possible mineral deposits, including the Longwood Range in Southland. In 1965, when the Geological Survey celebrated its centenary, Challis was the only female scientist employed there.

Lauder died in 1979. Challis retired to Motueka in 1995, where she volunteered at the Motueka District Museum.

Challis died in Nelson on 21 November 2010.

== Recognition ==
In 2017 Challis was selected as one of the Royal Society Te Apārangi's "150 women in 150 words", celebrating the contributions of women to knowledge in New Zealand.

== Selected works ==
- R. H. Herzer; G. A. Challis; R. H. K. Christie; G. H. Scott; W. A. Watters (June 1989). "The Urry Knolls, late Neogene alkaline basalt extrusives, southwestern Chatham Rise". Journal of the Royal Society of New Zealand. 19 (2): 181–193. doi:10.1080/03036758.1989.10426447. ISSN 0303-6758. Wikidata Q57873480.
- Challis, G. A. (1987). "Petrography of Igneous and Sedimentary Rocks from the Three Kings Islands, Northern New Zealand". Records of the Auckland Institute and Museum. 24: 233–242. ISSN 0067-0464. JSTOR 42906377. Wikidata Q58677324.
- J. M. Beggs; G. A. Challis; R. A. Cook (July 1990). "Basement geology of the Campbell Plateau: Implications for correlation of the Campbell Magnetic Anomaly System". New Zealand Journal of Geology and Geophysics. 33 (3): 401–404. doi:10.1080/00288306.1990.10425696. ISSN 0028-8306. Wikidata Q61012805.
- G. A Challis (1971), Report on visit to Australia and New Caledonia, August–September, 1971, Lower Hutt: Department of Scientific and Industrial Research, OCLC 299564868, Wikidata Q105102876
- Ian G Speden; G. A Challis (1975), Cretaceous stratigraphy of Raukumara peninsula, Wellington: Department of Scientific and Industrial Research, OCLC 636207796, Wikidata Q105102875
- G. A. CHALLLIS (1 January 1965). "The Origin of New Zealand Ultramafic Intrusions". Journal of Petrology. 6 (2): 322–364. doi:10.1093/petrology/6.2.322. ISSN 0022-3530. Wikidata Q106624291.
- G A Challis (1963), The petrology of the New Zealand ultramafic belt., Wikidata Q105102830
