= Elsa Kidson =

New Zealand soil scientist and sculptor

Elsa Kidson FRIC FNZIC FRSNZ
- Born: Elsa Beatrice Kidson; 15 March 1905; Christchurch, New Zealand
- Died: 25 July 1979 (aged 74); Nelson, New Zealand
- Education: MSc Canterbury University College
- Occupation: Soil scientist

Elsa Beatrice Kidson FRSNZ (18 March 1905 – 25 July 1979) was a New Zealand soil scientist and sculptor.

== Early life and education ==
Kidson was born in Christchurch, New Zealand, on 18 March 1905 to Charles Kidson, a sculptor and art teacher at Canterbury College School of Art, and Kitty Esther Kidson née Hounsell, who had some training as a teacher. The family lived in a comfortable home in the Cashmere Hills suburb of Christchurch, but when Charles died in 1908, Kitty moved with Kidson and her three younger brothers to Nelson to live with Charles Kidson's brother.

In 1927 Kidson graduated with a Masters in Science in organic chemistry from Canterbury College. During her study she had won the Sir George Grey Scholarship and the Hayden Prize in chemistry.

Kidson spent two years as a demonstrator for chemistry at Canterbury College, and then worked for the New Zealand Refrigeration Company in Christchurch. In 1931 she then joined the Department of Scientific and Industrial Research. where she was seconded to the chemical branch of the Soil Survey, which was part of the Geological Survey Branch. She worked for the Cawthron Institute in Nelson for 34 years, and became a world expert in magnesium deficiency in apples. Working with Joseph Dixon and Henry Askew, Kidson developed sensitive assays for trace elements in plant and soil material. She also showed definitively that a wasting disease affecting cattle grazed on volcanic soils in the North Island and parts of Nelson and the South Island was due to a lack of cobalt. Other research by Kidson focused on the vitamin C concentration in fruit, the link between calcium deficiency and bitter pit in apples, and trace element and nutritional disorders in tomatoes.

In 1952, Kidson received a DSc degree from the University of New Zealand.

Kidson died on 25 July 1976, aged 74, at her home in Nelson.

== Legacy and honours ==
Kidson was the first woman to be elected Fellow of the New Zealand Institute of Chemistry, in 1943. A year later she also became the first New Zealand woman to become a Fellow of the Royal Institute of Chemistry. She was made a Fellow of the Royal Society of New Zealand in 1963.

In 2017, Kidson was selected as one of the Royal Society Te Apārangi's 150 women in 150 words, celebrating the contributions of women to knowledge in New Zealand.

== Selected works ==
- E. B Kidson; Cawthron Institute (1938), Some factors influencing the cobalt contents of soils, Pasture and soil research publication, Nelson: Cawthron Institute, OCLC 156795066, Wikidata Q105069514
- E. B Kidson; Cawthron Institute; Department of Scientific and Industrial Research (1937). "Cobalt status of New Zealand soils". New Zealand Journal of Science and Technology (in undetermined language). ISSN 0375-0140. OCLC 166309814. Wikidata Q105069517.
- E. B Kidson; Cawthron Institute (1936), The effect of temperature on the extraction of "available" phosphoric acid in soils, OCLC 154250465, Wikidata Q105069520
- E. B Kidson; Cawthron Institute; New Zealand; Department of Scientific and Industrial Research (1943), An ash skeleton method for the diagnosis of magnesium and potassium deficiencies in apple leaves and for the determination of their distribution in the leaf (in undetermined language), OCLC 156795108, Wikidata Q105069523
- E. B Kidson; Cawthron Institute; New Zealand; Department of Scientific and Industrial Research (1944), The vitamin C content of Nelson apples (in undetermined language), OCLC 610198996, Wikidata Q105069527
- E. B Kidson; Cawthron Institute; New Zealand; Department of Scientific and Industrial Research (1944), Vitamin C content of different tomato varieties grown in the Nelson District (in undetermined language), OCLC 166309880, Wikidata Q105069528
