= Miss Hirst =

New Zealand astronomical observer, fl. 1859–1875

Miss Hirst (fl. 1850 – 1870s) was an early New Zealand astronomical observer. Her full name and many other biographical details are unknown.

== Biography ==
In 1875, Samuel John Lambert, a Professor of Music at Auckland University College, communicated a paper to the Monthly Notes of the Royal Astronomical Society in London, of which he was a fellow. Lambert described Miss Hirst as a resident of Auckland, and a "practical and careful observer", having been "engaged with astronomical observations for the past sixteen years" (i.e. since 1859). Astronomy historian Thomas Hockey regards her observations of the 1875 apparition of Jupiter as the best southern hemisphere report.

Hirst reported observations of colour changes in the belts and zones of Jupiter from February to May of 1875, during the planet's opposition. Interest in Jupiter was great at this time. A "dramatic reddening" of the equatorial zone of the planet had been noticed in 1869, which focused attention on the desirability of tracking colour changes, and ultimately led to the modern discovery of the Great Red Spot.

Hirst used Lord Rosse's notations for the bands and zones of colour, which had been published in the Monthly Notices in 1874. In particular, Hirst's report of "a small oval-patch of a decided sea-green" was commented on by other astronomers, including Sydney astronomer George Hirst (1846–1915) in 1876.

Lambert also wrote that Hirst's diary contained valuable observations about meteor showers observed in Auckland which he intended to communicate to the society later.

In 2017, despite the lack of biographical detail available, Hirst's observations were deemed significant enough for the Royal Society Te Apārangi to select her as one of "150 women in 150 words", celebrating the contributions of women to knowledge in New Zealand. They note, however, that she "exemplif[ies] the invisibility of many early women in science".

== 8 1/2 inch Browning reflector ==
Hirst is reported by Lambert to have used a Browning 8 1/2 inch reflector. The only recorded reflector of this make and size in New Zealand at this time was owned by James Henry Pope (1837–1913), Inspector of Schools, and donated to the Wellington Astronomical Society in the 1960s. A history of the reflector has been published by Tony Dodson, archivist of the Wellington Astronomical Society, showing that in 1879 Pope published observations over an eight-year period made using an 8 1/2 inch With-Browning reflector, so was in possession of it before 1871. Pope, who was born in Jersey, emigrated with his parents to Ballarat in 1852, where he was appointed headmaster of a school in 1858. He moved to Dunedin in 1863 where he was assistant master at Otago Boys High School, but in 1871 returned to Ballarat. Pope then returned once more to New Zealand in 1880 as Inspector of Schools. There is no record of him spending time in Auckland or leaving the telescope in New Zealand during his return to Ballarat, although in 1882 a JD Hewitt reported observations made in Wairarapa using the reflector, borrowed from Pope.
