= John Stuart Yeates =

New Zealand academic and botanist (1900–1986)

John Stuart Yeates MBE
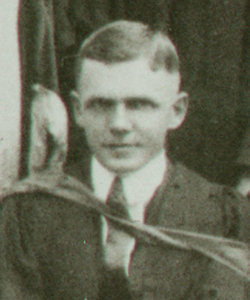
- Yeates in 1929
- Born: John Stuart Yeates; 11 July 1900
- Died: 24 August 1986 (aged 86); Palmerston North, New Zealand
- Education: PhDs from University of New Zealand and Cambridge University
- Occupation: Founding head of Agricultural Botany
- Title: Department head
- Spouse: Ruth Lillian Young
- Children: Duncan Robert Yeates, Gregor William Yeates
- Scientific career
- Workplaces: Massey Agricultural College

John Stuart Yeates MBE (11 July 1900 – 24 August 1986) was a New Zealand academic and botanist. The founding head of Agricultural Botany at Massey Agricultural College, he was also an accomplished breeder of azaleas, rhododendrons and lilies.

== Early life and education ==
Born into a farming family in Waitara in the Taranaki, Yeates attended Stratford District High School, where he won an Entrance Scholarship (later called the University Entrance Scholarship), and then Victoria College (now Victoria University of Wellington, then part of the University of New Zealand) in Wellington. He completed a BSc and then a MSc in Botany with first class honours. He obtained a Jacob Joseph Scholarship.

He then completed the first PhD from the University of New Zealand.

He was also an active member of the Victoria College Tramping Club, having Yeates Peak and Yeates track in the Tararua Range named after him.

He left for Trinity College, Cambridge, where he studied chromosomal counts in plants, starting in 1925. He returned to New Zealand in July 1927 and was awarded his Trinity College PhD in 1931, having completed his research in parallel with his teaching commitments at the newly created Massey College (now Massey University, then also part of the University of New Zealand) outside Palmerston North.

== Academic work ==
His early research was on New Zealand flax/Phormium tenax (Māori: harakeke), which at the time was used extensively as fibre for ropes and cloths. One of the key centres for production was the delta of the Manawatu River, but Yeates travelled extensively looking for quality cultivars which he grew on the Turitea campus. Flax had long been used for textiles (see Māori traditional textiles) and it was correctly guessed that the best cultivars were to be found adjacent to historical sites of textile-making. The Great Depression of the 1930s caused serious damaged the commercial flax industry in New Zealand and it never recovered.

Some of the flax worked involved chromosome counting, which he had previously done in his thesis work. The flax Ngaro was found to have 32 rather than the normal 24 chromosomes.

Later research involved "farm forestry", a movement to introduce trees onto farms for the benefit of livestock, pasture and crops and as a source of income.

He was the founding head of Agricultural Botany at Massey and this was his core teaching area. In 1954 he, with E. O. Campbell, published Agricultural Botany, a textbook based on this teaching.

== Plant breeding ==
Yeates was a foundation member of the New Zealand Rhododendron Association in 1944 and also its some-time Secretary-Treasurer. He was also crucial in the founding of the national garden of the association (now "Heritage Park") at Kimbolton (which is close to his home in Palmerston North, but has better soil and climate for rhododendron). He was also active in the introduction and breeding of azaleas, rhododendrons and Lilium hybrids.

=== Lilies ===
Lilium auratum and Lilium speciosum were first crossed in the 1860s, but then not again until the 1950s by Yeates and Leslie Jury in New Zealand.

The name Melford Hybrids was used for his lily crosses, which he bred initially at his property on Long Melford Rd, in Palmerston North. His cultivars include:

- auratum var. platyphyllum 'Goldie'
- auratum var. platyphyllum 'Little Gem'
- auratum var. rubrovittatum 'Alex'
- auratum var. rubrovittatum 'Apollo'
- auratum var. rubrovittatum 'Dainty'
- auratum 'Tom Thumb'
- 'Darkie'
- 'Dianne'
- 'Emberglow'
- 'Fairy'
- 'Golden Eclipse'
- 'Kimbolton Gold'
- × parkmanii 'Betty'
- × parkmanii‘Elaine'
- × parkmanii 'Elizabeth'
- × parkmanii 'Erebus'
- × parkmanii 'Excelsior'
- × parkmanii 'John Bull'
- × parkmanii 'Journey’s End' (commercially successful)
- × parkmanii 'Judas'
- × parkmanii 'Kimbolton Pink'
- × parkmanii‘Kimbolton Red'
- × parkmanii Lavender Lady Group
- × parkmanii 'Lavender Princess'
- × parkmanii 'Little Jane'
- × parkmanii 'Little Lavender'
- × parkmanii 'Little Robin'
- × parkmanii 'Melford Red'
- × parkmanii 'Peggy' (named after his wife)
- × parkmanii 'Pink Beauty'
- × parkmanii 'Pink Delight'
- × parkmanii 'Pink Journey'
- × parkmanii 'Pink Sensation'
- × parkmanii 'Red Ace'
- × parkmanii 'Red Gem'
- × parkmanii 'Red Trump'
- × parkmanii 'Ringatira'
- × parkmanii 'Rising Star'
- × parkmanii 'Snowflakes'
- × parkmanii 'Snowy'
- × parkmanii 'Tetra Journey'
- × parkmanii 'Tiger Face'
- × parkmanii 'Trixie'
- 'Peach Bouquet'
- 'Penelope'
- Phillipa'
- 'Red Ruby'
- 'Swan Lake'
- 'Waireka'
- 'Walter Ward'

== Awards ==
- 1918 Entrance Scholarship
- 1922 National Research Scholarship
- 1925 First Post-Graduate Scholarship in Science
- 1957 Associate of Honour of the Royal New Zealand Institute of Horticulture.
- 1968 Veitch Memorial Medal, Royal Horticultural Society
- 1969 Lyttel Lily Cup, Royal Horticultural Society
- 1977 Member of the Order of the British Empire (MBE), for services to horticulture, in the 1978 New Year Honours

== Bibliography ==
- J. S. Yeates, "The Root Nodules of Conifers" – 1923 – MSc thesis Victoria University College
- J. S. Yeates, "The Nucleolus of Tmesipteris tannensis" Proceedings of the Royal Society London. Ser. B. 98, 1925, 227–224.
- J. S. Yeates, Some problems in the comparison of Chromosomes – 1931 – PhD thesis University of Cambridge
- J. S. Yeates, Farm Trees and Hedges – 1942 – Massey Agricultural College (University of New Zealand)
- J. S. Yeates, Farm Trees and Hedges 2nd Edition – 1948 – Massey Agricultural College (University of New Zealand)
- J. S. Yeates and E. O. Campbell, Agricultural Botany 1954 – Massey Agricultural College (University of New Zealand)
- J. S. Yeates and E. O. Campbell, Agricultural Botany 2nd Edition 1960 – Government Printer (Wellington, New Zealand)
- J. S. Yeates Rhododendron Growing in New Zealand; Its Past, Present, and Future 1972 – Journal American Rhododendron Society
- J. S. Yeates Regular articles in The New Zealand Gardener 1940s–1950s
