= Edwina Pio =

New Zealand academic

Edwina Pio ONZM
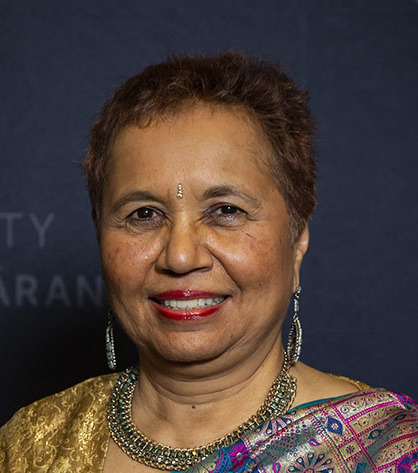
- Edwina Pio at 2019 Research Honours Aotearoa

Edwina Pio ONZM is a New Zealand academic. Pio is currently a full professor of Diversity at the Auckland University of Technology.

== Academic career ==
Pio's work is frequently talked about in the New Zealand media and she is frequently sought for opinions on diversity-related topics, including gender issues and race relations.

== Honours and awards ==
Pio was awarded the Te Rangi Hiroa Medal in 2019 for "her pioneering research that has had a significant impact on how ethnic minority migrants are (de)constructed in organisations and how religion and ethnicity are powerful entwined forces in the business and social arenas in New Zealand and internationally".

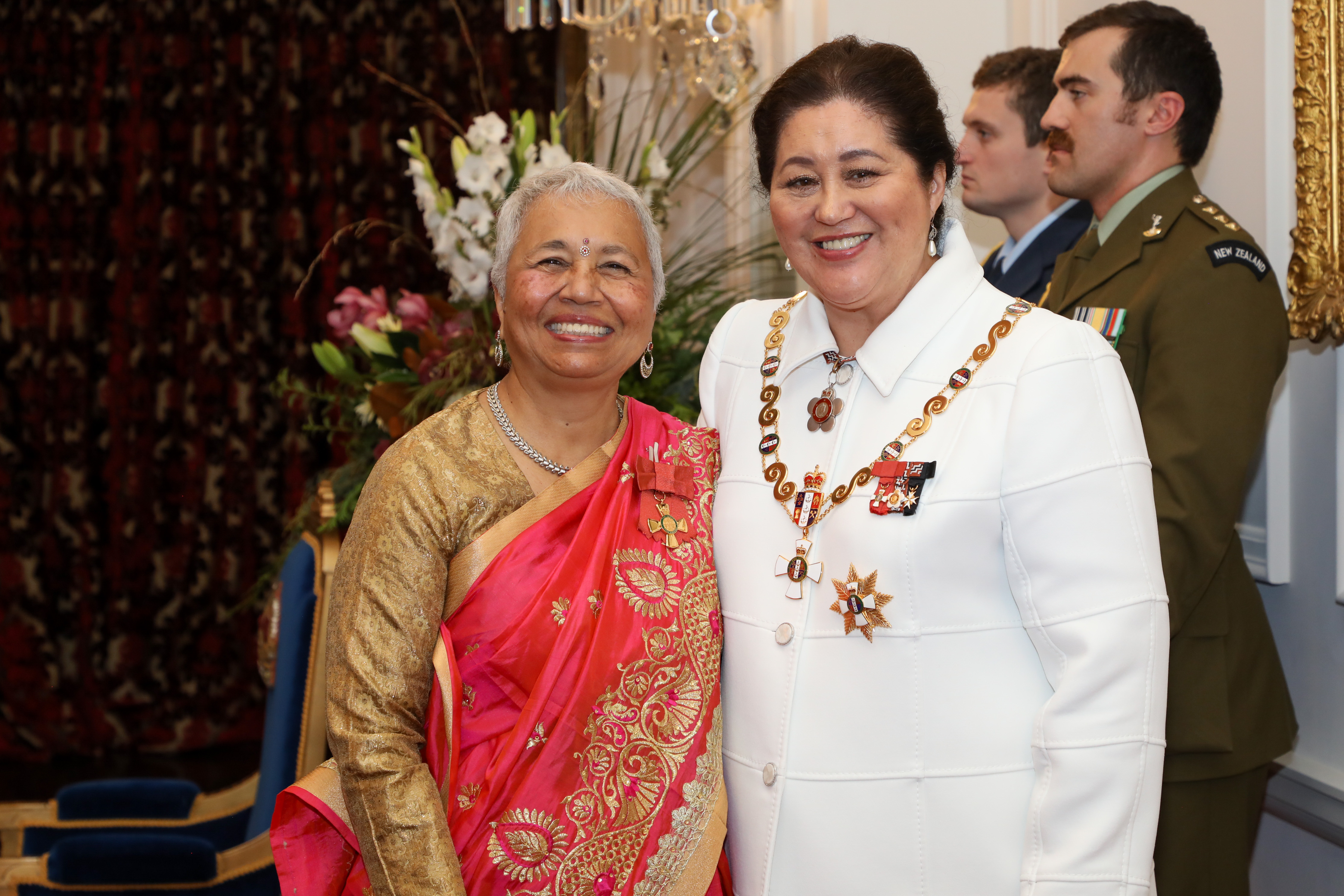
Pio (left), after her investiture as an Officer of the New Zealand Order of Merit by the governor-general, Dame Cindy Kiro, at Government House, Wellington, on 25 May 2023

In the 2023 New Year Honours, Pio was appointed an Officer of the New Zealand Order of Merit, for services to ethnic communities.

== Selected works ==
- Faith-Based Violence and Deobandi Militancy in Pakistan
- Syed, Jawad, and Edwina Pio. "Veiled diversity? Workplace experiences of Muslim women in Australia." Asia Pacific Journal of Management 27, no. 1 (2010): 115–137.
- Spiller, Chellie, Ljiljana Erakovic, Manuka Henare, and Edwina Pio. "Relational well-being and wealth: Māori businesses and an ethic of care." Journal of Business Ethics 98, no. 1 (2011): 153–169.
- Pio, Edwina. "Knotted strands: Working lives of Indian women migrants in New Zealand." Human Relations 58, no. 10 (2005): 1277–1299.
- Spiller, Chellie, Edwina Pio, Lijijana Erakovic, and Manuka Henare. "Wise up: Creating organizational wisdom through an ethic of Kaitiakitanga." Journal of Business Ethics 104, no. 2 (2011): 223–235.
- Pio, Edwina. "Ethnic entrepreneurship among Indian women in New Zealand: A bittersweet process." Gender, Work & Organization 14, no. 5 (2007): 409–432.
