= Lydia Suckling =

New Zealand botanist

Lydia Annie Suckling
- Born: 3 January 1890; Christchurch
- Died: 10 March 1979 (aged 89)
- Other names: Lydia Annie Hickmott (married name)
- Education: MA in Botany with second class honours, Canterbury University College
- Occupation: Teacher
- Employer(s): Canterbury University College; Napier Girls High School; Auckland Girls' Grammar School

Lydia Annie Suckling (later Hickmott; 3 January 1890 – 10 March 1979) was a New Zealand botanist.

== Early life and education ==
Suckling was born on 3 January 1890 in Christchurch, to parents Evelyn and Walter, and attended Richmond Primary School and Christchurch Girls' High School. In 1907, Suckling was a Senior National and Gammack Scholar. She obtained a BA in 1911, and in 1912 achieved Second Class Honours in botany from Canterbury University College.

Suckling's Masters' thesis was on plant ecology of the forests on the Port Hills, and she published a paper from this work in 1913. In her paper, she thanks Leonard Cockayne for his assistance. The paper was communicated on Suckling's behalf by zoologist Charles Chilton, who was the Chair of Biology at the college at the time.

== Teaching career ==
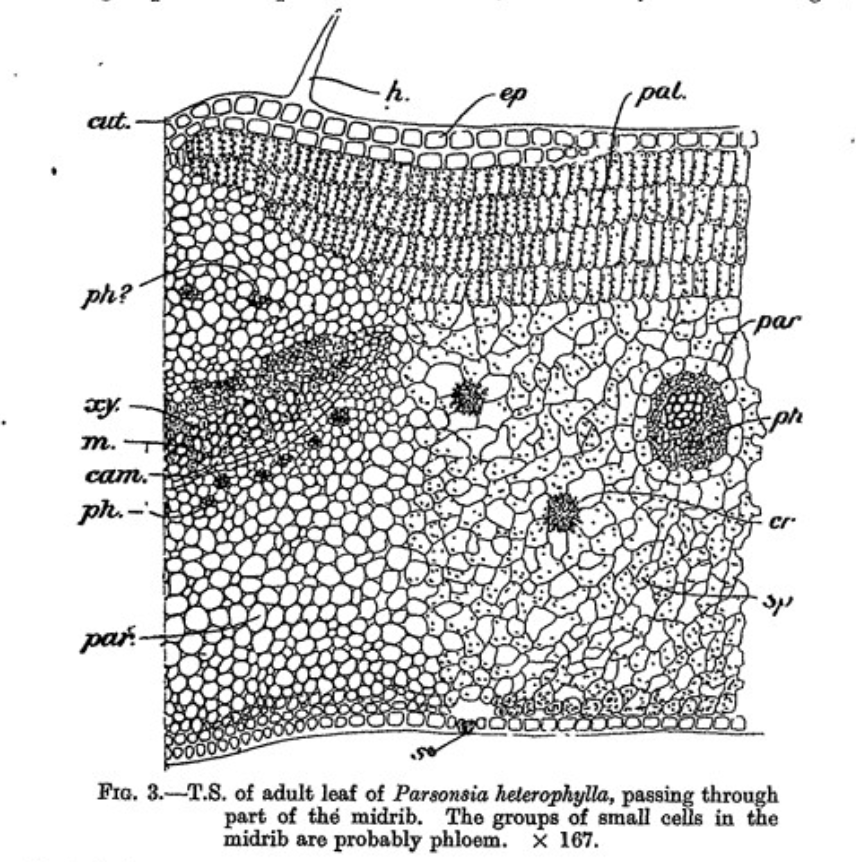
Diagram of the leaf structure of Parsonsia heterophylla (New Zealand jasmine) as drawn by Lydia Suckling

As was common for university-educated women in New Zealand at the time, Suckling entered teaching after completing her studies. She was employed as a student assistant at Canterbury University College in 1910, and then taught at Napier Girls' High School from 1912 to 1915. She worked at Auckland Girls' Grammar School 1916–17.

On 8 May 1918 Suckling married Ewin John Bramwell Hickmott and had three sons. Hickmott was a fruit-grower who later became the "biggest breeder and producer of pigs in the South Island". Suckling died on 10 March 1979.

== Recognition ==
In 2017, Suckling was selected to be profiled as one of the Royal Society Te Apārangi's "150 women in 150 words" project.

== Publications ==
- "Leaf-anatomy of Trees and Shrubs on the Port Hills" (1913) Transactions and Proceedings of the New Zealand Institute
