= Edith Farkas =

Antarctic researcher

- Born: Edit Farkas; 13 October 1921; Gyula, Hungary
- Died: 3 February 1993 (aged 71); Wellington, New Zealand
- Education: Victoria University Wellington
- Scientific career
- Fields: Atmospheric Science
- Workplaces: New Zealand Met Office

Edith Elizabeth Farkas (13 October 1921 – 3 February 1993) was a New Zealand Antarctic researcher, best known for being the first Hungarian woman and also the first New Zealand MetService female staff member to set foot in Antarctica. In addition she conducted world-leading ozone monitoring research for over 30 years.

== Early life and education ==
Edit Farkas was born on 13 October 1921 in Gyula, Hungary. She attended elementary and secondary schooling in Szentgotthárd and Győr, Budapest. In 1939, Farkas entered university and graduated in 1944 with a degree as a mathematics and physics teacher from Pázmány Péter Catholic University in Budapest. She emigrated to New Zealand as a refugee in 1949, after the war, where she completed a MSc Degree in Physics in 1952 at Victoria University of Wellington.

== Career and impact ==
Farkas was a meteorologist, ozone researcher. She started working as a meteorologist in the Research Section of the New Zealand Meteorological Service in 1951 where she continued to do so for some 35 years.

Farkas monitored ozone from the 1950s until her retirement in 1986, undertaking world-leading research in the field of ozone monitoring over more than three decades. During 1960s her work shifted increasingly to the study of atmospheric ozone including the measurement of total ozone with the Dobson ozone spectrophotometer. She became one of a small international group of atmospheric scientists dedicated to the study of atmospheric ozone-interest in which, in that era, was largely in use as a tracer to aid atmospheric circulation studies. Her work contributed substantially towards the discovery of the "hole in the ozone layer" which changed the world's behavior towards pollution forever. Her interest in atmospheric ozone measurement led naturally to the application of her expertise to the monitoring of surface ozone as part of air pollution studies and also to the measurement of atmospheric turbidity.

Farkas was the first Hungarian woman and also the first female New Zealand MetService staff member to set foot in Antarctica in 1975. Her World War II diaries form the basis of a book titled The Farkas Files.

== Death and legacy ==
Farkas was the first woman to be awarded the New Zealand MetService Henry Hill Award in 1986, upon her retirement. She received special recognition at the Quadrennial Ozone Symposium in Germany in 1988 for her 30-year contribution to Ozone research. Edith donated a number of personal belongings and other objects connected to her career to the Hungarian Geographical Museum, including some rock samples from Antarctica, photographs, publications and the original copy of her novel on her stay in the southernmost continent. She fought a long battle with bone cancer, and died in Wellington on 3 February 1993.

In 2017, Farkas was selected as one of the Royal Society Te Apārangi's "150 women in 150 words", celebrating the contributions of women to knowledge in New Zealand.
