= Thelma Kent =

New Zealand photographer (1899–1946)

- Self-portrait panning for gold in the Arawhata River, Westland, 1939
- Born: Thelma Rene Kent; 21 October 1899; Christchurch, New Zealand
- Died: 23 June 1946 (aged 46); Christchurch, New Zealand
- Known for: Photography

Thelma Rene Kent (21 October 1899 – 23 June 1946) was a New Zealand photographer.

== Biography ==
Kent was born in Christchurch, New Zealand on 21 October 1899. She attended Addington School and Christchurch Technical College.

She traveled around New Zealand by car, horseback and foot to find photographic subjects. She had an affinity for the New Zealand landscape, with a particular interest in the South Island high country. Around 1937, Kent met the legendary Arawata Bill (William O’Leary) and took several photographs of him, which have been regularly reproduced.

Her photographs and articles were published in the Auckland Weekly News, the New Zealand Railways Magazine,the Australasian Photo-Review and in the British annual Photograms of the Year 1939.

From 1939 until 1941 she did a series of Saturday evening talks on Christchurch radio station 3YA on photography topics.

Through experimentation, Kent became adept at microphotography. In this field she did work for the organisations such as the Canterbury Museum, Cawthron Institute, and the Pathology Department at Christchurch Hospital.

Kent never married and died at the age of 46 in Christchurch on 23 June 1946.

== Legacy ==
Her collection of negatives and prints is held by the Alexander Turnbull Library in Wellington.

In 2017, Kent was selected as one of the Royal Society Te Apārangi's "150 women in 150 words", celebrating the contributions of women to knowledge in New Zealand.
