= Martha King =

New Zealand botanical artist, teacher and gardener (1803 – 1897)

- Born: c.1803 Ireland
- Died: 31 May 1897 (aged 94); New Plymouth, New Zealand
- Known for: Botanical Art

Martha King (c.1803 – 31 May 1897) was New Zealand's first resident botanical illustrator. She was a prominent figure in early Whanganui and New Plymouth as a founder of schools in both districts. She was a talented gardener and schoolteacher.

== Life ==
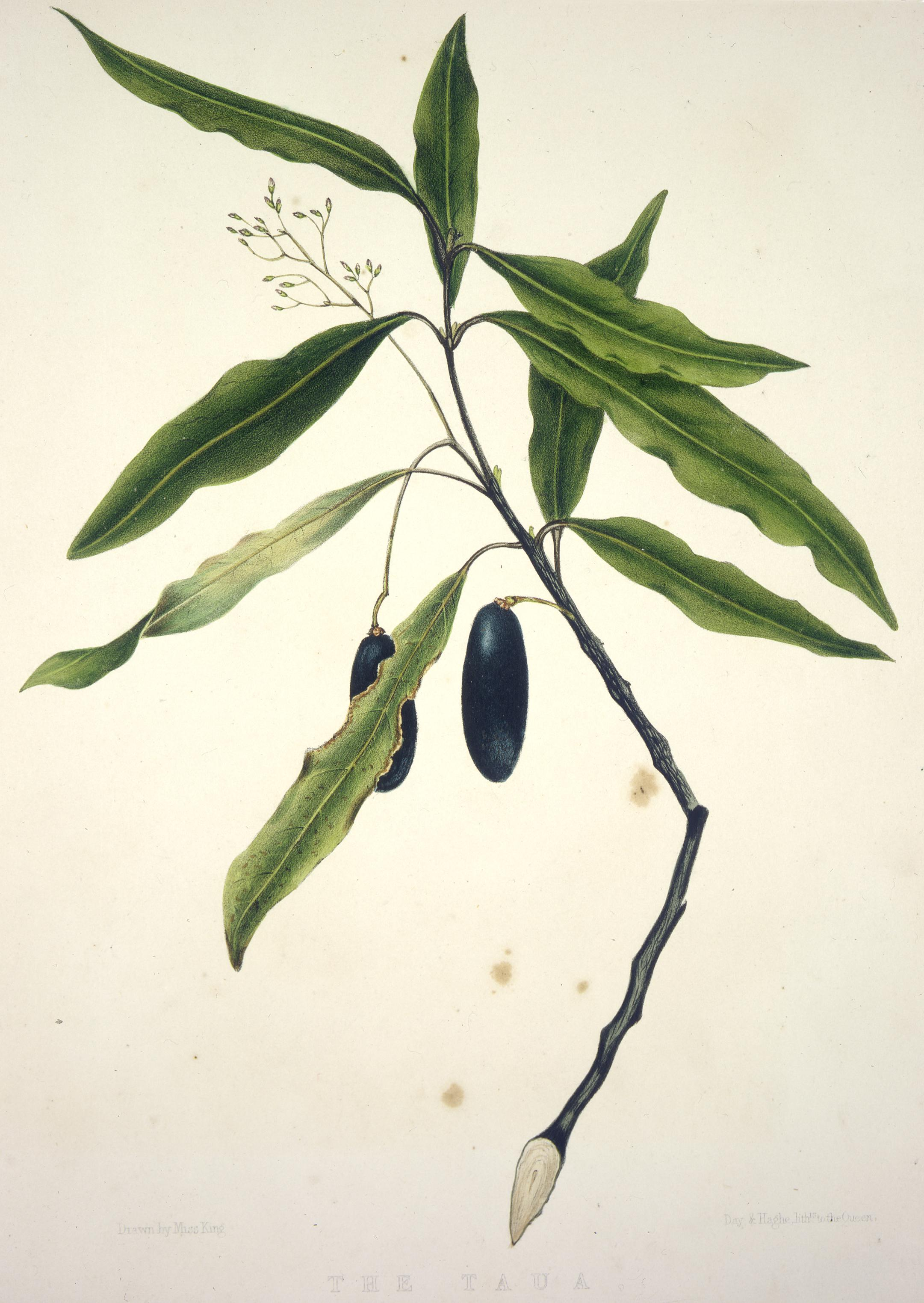
The taua, a large forest-tree, drawn by King in 1842

Martha King was born in Ireland in 1802 or 1803. The family were Socinians, and it is possible that King worked as a governess before emigrating. She emigrated to New Zealand in December 1840, arriving at Wellington on board the barque London. She travelled with her eldest sister, Maria, and her brother, Samuel Popham King.

From Wellington, the Kings sailed to Whanganui on board the Elizabeth, arriving on 27 February 1841, and became foundation settlers of the new town. They had purchased a section of the land acquired by Colonel William Wakefield for the New Zealand Company. Samuel King built two houses, and Martha King and her sister opened Whanganui's first school soon afterward. One source claims the school was popular, with the sisters balancing discipline and kindness well.

In December 1847, the King family moved to New Plymouth, sailing on board the Ralph Bernal. King opened a school with her sister, Maria, and her sister-in-law, Mary Jane King, while living in New Plymouth. This venue was also used for other functions, such as balls and cultural activities, which reflected the Kings' prominent presence in New Plymouth's public life. Both sisters also wove flax to make cloth, bags and other goods to supplement their income. King created a "fine garden", and leaving it was a cause of distress when she temporarily moved to Auckland for safety during the First Taranaki War of 1860–1861.

King died at her New Plymouth home on 31 May 1897, aged 94 years.

== Work ==
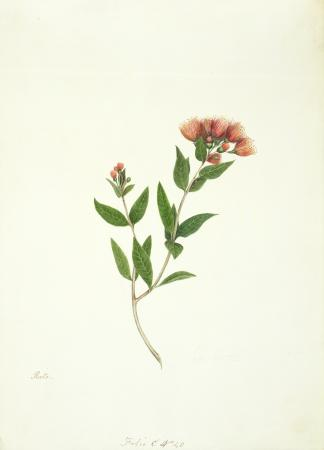
A watercolour of New Zealand rātā by King, dated 1842

King was one of the early British and Irish settlers who turned to botanical illustration to "eke out a livelihood in rough conditions".

In September 1842, King was commissioned by the Wellington Horticultural and Botanical Society to prepare two sets of drawings of interesting indigenous botanical specimens, one to be forwarded to the directors of the New Zealand Company, and the other to the London Horticultural Society. Exactly why King was chosen for this commission is unknown. The first set of 40 watercolours was completed by January 1843, reaching the New Zealand Company in London in September 1843; it was acquired by the Alexander Turnbull Library in 1981. The second set has disappeared without trace.

In 1845, four of King's lithographs appeared in Edward Jerningham Wakefield's Illustrations to Adventures in New Zealand.

Apart from the botanical watercolours, all that remains of King's work are 16 pencil sketches depicting scenes of Wellington, Whanganui and New Plymouth, dated between 1841 and 1859. Although King later exhibited at the Sydney International Exhibition of 1879, no other examples of her work are known to have survived.

== Recognition ==
In 2017, King was selected as one of the Royal Society Te Apārangi's "150 women in 150 words", celebrating the contributions of women to knowledge in New Zealand.
