= Paddy Bassett =

New Zealand agricultural scientist (1918–2019)

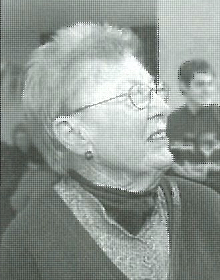
Bassett in 2003

Elsie Gertrude "Paddy" Bassett (née Thorpe, 15 July 1918 – 20 July 2019) was a New Zealand agricultural scientist. She graduated from Massey Agricultural College in 1941, becoming the first woman graduate from that institution. Bassett was also one of the first two women students accepted into Canterbury Agricultural College (now Lincoln University).

== Early life and education ==
Elsie Gertrude "Paddy" Thorpe was born in remote Menzies Bay on Banks Peninsula in the South Island of New Zealand, on 15 July 1918. Her parents were Francis Thorpe, a farmer who later became an Anglican clergyman, and Constance (Connie) Menzies. She grew up on the family farm and was initially taught by a governess, although she later went to Okains Bay Primary School.

She was sent to boarding school in Timaru, where she attended Craighead Diocesan School and excelled in Latin and French. The school did not offer science subjects though, and as Bassett had decided to become a vet, after completing high school she enrolled for two years of intermediate study at Canterbury College, Christchurch (now University of Canterbury). However the nearest place to study veterinary science was Sydney, Australia, and Bassett decided to change her plans and study agriculture.

She applied to Lincoln Agricultural College (now Lincoln University), however the university did not accept women students at the time. Instead, she enrolled at Massey Agricultural College and became its first female student. On arrival at Massey, she changed her name to "Paddy" as she had always disliked her forename.

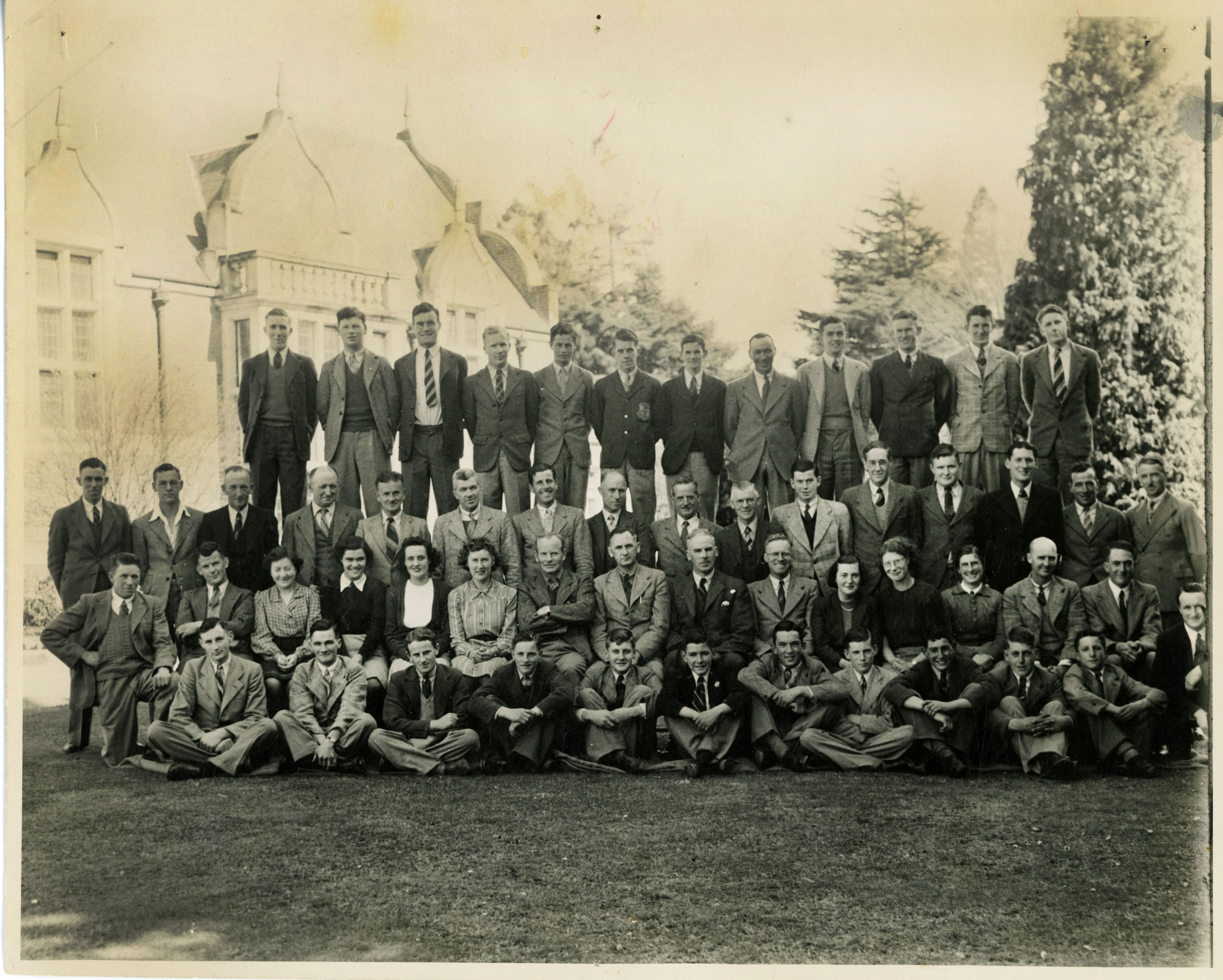
Thorpe at Lincoln College in 1942 (second row, sixth from left)

Bassett graduated with a Bachelor of Agricultural Science in 1941, and took a position as assistant research officer in the Animal Research Division of the Department of Agriculture. She wanted to continue her studies however and, along with Daintry Walker, Massey's second woman agricultural science graduate, convinced Lincoln College's Campbell McMeekan to accept them as the first women students at the College. The topic of her master's thesis was the relationship between cattle pituitary glands and ovarian dysfunction.

On 5 October 1943, she married Colin Holman Bassett at Holy Trinity Church in the Christchurch suburb of Avonside.

== Career ==
Bassett next moved to Hamilton, in the North Island of New Zealand, to continue her research under McMeekan at the newly-formed Ruakura Animal Research Station. In 1954 she enrolled at the University of Cambridge for her doctoral studies, spending two years studying and researching under John Dixon Boyd. Her PhD thesis, titled Observations on the anatomy of the ewe: with special reference to pregnancy and parturition, was completed in 1957. On her return to New Zealand, she settled in Dunedin and worked in the Medical Research Council's Endocrinology Unit at the University of Otago's Dunedin Medical School. She also lectured on connective tissue to medical students at the School.

In 1980, Bassett moved to Nelson and took a position as honorary research fellow to the Nelson Hospital Board. Much of her research while in Nelson was collaborative, with researchers at the University of Otago's Wellington School of Medicine. While in her 80s, she was appointed an honourable staff member of the pathology department at the School, and moved to Wellington to continue her research into connective tissue change. Bassett retired from research in her 90s, having published more than 20 research papers.

Bassett died on 20 July 2019, five days after her 101st birthday.

== Awards and honours ==
In 2002, Bassett received a Massey University Anniversary Medal for her special contribution to her field. In 2017, she was selected as one of the Royal Society of New Zealand's "150 women in 150 words".
