= Joan Metge =

New Zealand anthropologist (1930–2025)

Dame Joan Metge DBE
- Born: Alice Joan Metge; 21 February 1930; Auckland, New Zealand
- Died: 17 September 2025 (aged 95); Auckland, New Zealand

Academic background
- Education: University of Auckland; London School of Economics

Academic work
- Discipline: Anthropology
- Sub-discipline: Social anthropology; Māori

Dame Alice Joan Metge DBE (21 February 1930 – 17 September 2025) was a New Zealand social anthropologist, educator, lecturer and writer.

== Life and career ==
Metge was born in the Auckland suburb of Mount Roskill on 21 February 1930, the daughter of Alice Mary Metge (née Rigg) and Cedric Leslie Metge. She was educated at Matamata District High School and Epsom Girls' Grammar School. She went on to study at Auckland University College, graduating Master of Arts with first-class honours in 1952, and the London School of Economics where she earned her PhD in 1958.

As of 2004, she continued to advance peace initiatives via her work as a member of the Waitangi National Trust Board, a conference presenter, adviser, and as a mentor to mediators and conflict management practitioners. A scholar on Māori topics, she was recognised for promoting cross-cultural awareness and published a number of books and articles in her career. She likened the relationship among the people of New Zealand to "a rope [of] many strands which when woven or working together create a strong nation" (as paraphrased by Silvia Cartwright).

Metge died on 17 September 2025, at the age of 95.

== Honours and awards ==
Metge was appointed a Dame Commander of the Order of the British Empire in the 1987 Queen's Birthday Honours, for services to anthropology. In 1990, she received the New Zealand 1990 Commemoration Medal. She was awarded the Royal Society of New Zealand's Te Rangi Hiroa Medal for her research in the social sciences in 1997. In 2001, the University of Auckland awarded Metge an honorary LittD degree. In 2006 she received the Asia-Pacific Mediation Forum Peace Prize in Suva, Fiji. In 2017, Metge was selected as one of the Royal Society Te Apārangi's "150 women in 150 words", celebrating the contributions of women to knowledge in New Zealand.

== Dame Joan Metge Medal ==
In recognition of Metge's contribution to social sciences, the Royal Society of New Zealand established the Dame Joan Metge Medal in 2006. The medal is awarded every two years to a New Zealand social scientist for excellence in teaching, research and/or other activities contributing to capacity building and beneficial relationships between research participants. Since 2017, the medal has been referred to as the Metge Medal.
