= Kim Pickering =

New Zealand composite materials engineer

Kim Louise Pickering FRSNZ
- Education: Imperial College London
- Awards: Scott Medal
- Scientific career
- Fields: Composite material
- Workplaces: University of Waikato

Kim Louise Pickering FRSNZ is a New Zealand composite materials engineer. She is currently a full professor at the University of Waikato.

== Academic career ==
After a BSc(ENG) at Imperial College London, three years at Plessey Research Caswell and a PhD at the University of Surrey, Pickering started working at the University of Waikato in 1994 and rose to full professor in 2014.

Much of Pickering's research involves 3D printing of "recyclable, biodegradable and bio-derived composite materials" and she has been a major proponent of recycling.

In 2017 she won the RJ Scott Medal from the Royal Society of New Zealand. Also in 2017, Pickering was selected as one of the Royal Society Te Apārangi's "150 women in 150 words", celebrating the contributions of women to knowledge in New Zealand.

In 2026 Pickering was elected a Fellow of the Royal Society Te Apārangi.

== Selected works ==
- Pickering, K.L.; Efendy, M.G. Aruan; Le, T.M. (2016). "A review of recent developments in natural fibre composites and their mechanical performance". Composites Part A: Applied Science and Manufacturing. 83: 98–112. doi:10.1016/j.compositesa.2015.08.038. hdl:10289/9787.
- Pickering, K.L.; Beckermann, G.W.; Alam, S.N.; Foreman, N.J. (2007). "Optimising industrial hemp fibre for composites". Composites Part A: Applied Science and Manufacturing. 38 (2): 461–468. doi:10.1016/j.compositesa.2006.02.020. hdl:10289/9805.
- Beckermann, G.W.; Pickering, K.L. (2008). "Engineering and evaluation of hemp fibre reinforced polypropylene composites: Fibre treatment and matrix modification". Composites Part A: Applied Science and Manufacturing. 39 (6): 979–988. doi:10.1016/j.compositesa.2008.03.010.
- Pickering, Kim L. (2008). Properties and performance of natural-fibre composites. doi:10.1533/9781845694593. ISBN 978-1-84569-267-4.
- Pickering, K.L.; Abdalla, A.; Ji, C.; McDonald, A.G.; Franich, R.A. (2003). "The effect of silane coupling agents on radiata pine fibre for use in thermoplastic matrix composites". Composites Part A: Applied Science and Manufacturing. 34 (10): 915–926. doi:10.1016/S1359-835X(03)00234-3. hdl:10289/9806.
