= Tracey McIntosh =

New Zealand sociology and criminology academic

Tracey McIntosh MNZM
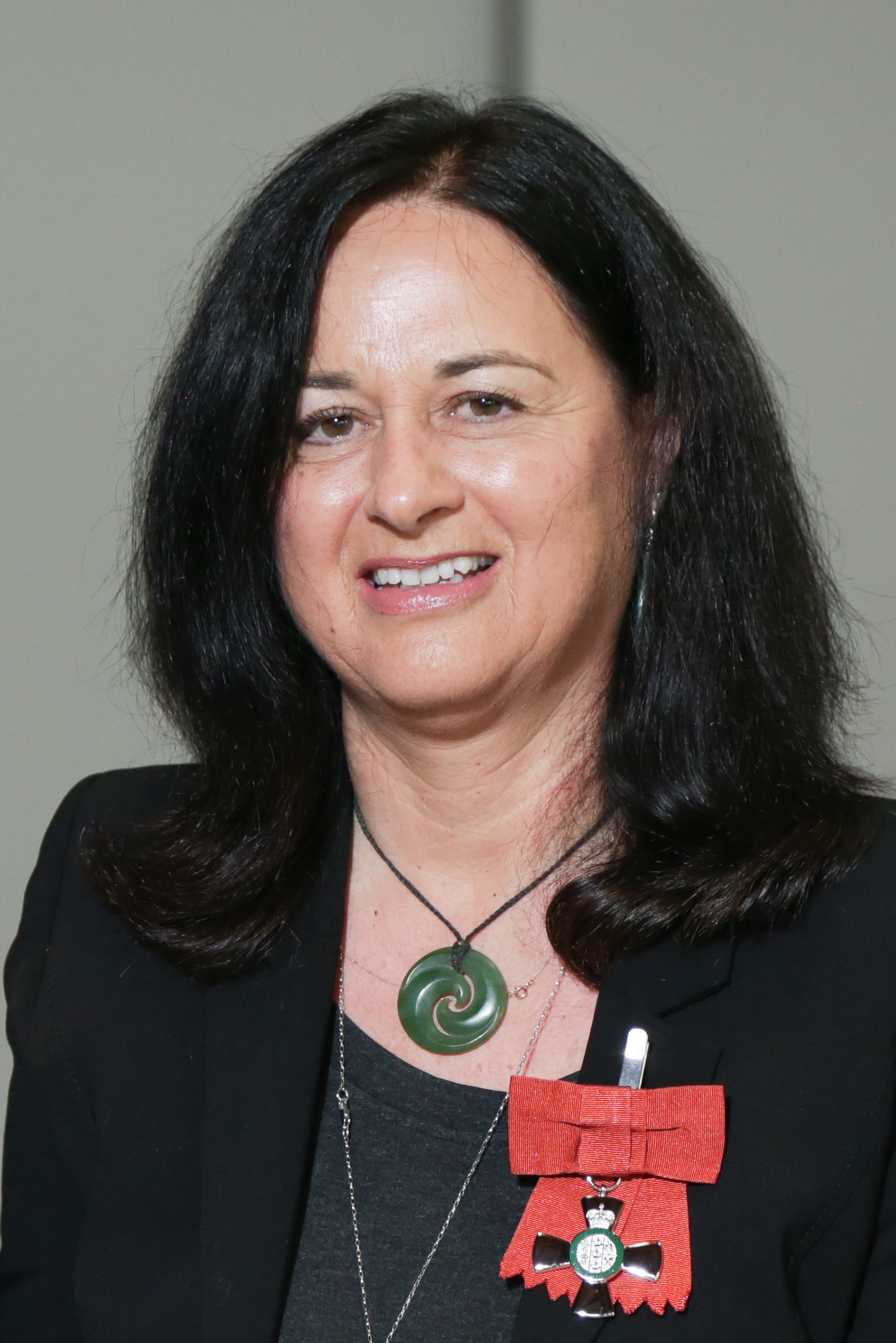
- McIntosh in 2019
- Education: University of Auckland
- Scientific career
- Fields: Sociology
- Workplaces: University of Auckland
- Thesis: Death in the Margins: Riding the Periphery (2002)

Tracey Kathleen Dorothy McIntosh MNZM is a New Zealand sociology and criminology academic. She is of Māori descent (Ngāi Tūhoe) and is currently a Professor of Indigenous Studies and Co-Head of Te Wānanga o Waipapa at the University of Auckland.

== Academic career ==
After a 2002 PhD titled Death in the Margins: Riding the Periphery at the University of Auckland, she rose to full professor at the same institution. McIntosh is one of two editors of AlterNative.

In 2017, she won the Te Rangi Hiroa Medal. The same year McIntosh was selected as one of the Royal Society Te Apārangi's "150 women in 150 words", celebrating the contributions of women to knowledge in New Zealand.

In 2018, McIntosh was appointed to the New Zealand Government's Welfare Expert Advisory Group and the Safe and Effective Justice Advisory Group.

In the 2019 New Year Honours, McIntosh was appointed a Member of the New Zealand Order of Merit, for services to education and social science.

As of October 2022 McIntosh is Head of Te Wānanga o Waipapa at the University of Auckland where her research has included how to stop the intergenerational transfer of inequality.

McIntosh's book, Māori and Social Issues, published in 2011, was selected as one of the 180 most significant works of Māori-authored non-fiction.

== Selected works ==
- McIntosh, Tracey. "Māori identities: Fixed, fluid, forced." New Zealand Identities: Departures and Destinations (2005): 38–51.
- Liu, James H., Tim McCreanor, Tracey McIntosh, and Teresia Teaiwa. "Introduction: Constructing New Zealand Identities." New Zealand Identities: Departures and Destinations (2005): 11–20.
- McIntosh, Tracey, and Malcolm Mulholland. Maori and Social Issues. Huia Publishers, 2011.
- McIntosh, Tracey. "Hibiscus in the flax bush: The Maori-Pacific island interface." Tangata O Te Moana Nui: The Evolving Identities of Pacific Peoples in Aotearoa/New Zealand (2001): 141–159.
- McIntosh, Tracey (2006). "Theorising Marginality and the Processes of Marginalisation". AlterNative. 2: 44–65. doi:10.1177/117718010600200103. hdl:2292/16363. S2CID 142449770.
