= Ruth Fitzgerald =

New Zealand academic

- Born: Ruth Patricia Fitzgerald; 1956 (age 69–70)
- Education: University of Otago
- Scientific career
- Fields: anthropology
- Workplaces: University of Otago
- Thesis: Who cares? : an ethnographic investigation of the meaning of care (1999)

Ruth Patricia Fitzgerald (born 1956) is a New Zealand anthropology academic, and as of 2019 is a full professor at the University of Otago.

== Academic career ==
After a 1999 PhD titled Who cares? : an ethnographic investigation of the meaning of care at the University of Otago, Fitzgerald joined the staff, rising to full professor in 2018. In 2015 Fitzgerald was awarded the Royal Society of New Zealand's Te Rangi Hiroa Medal. Her work covers the social and political context of many health issues, such as the ethics of reversing heritable deafness or terminating pregnancy.

In 2017, Fitzgerald was selected as one of the Royal Society Te Apārangi's "150 women in 150 words", celebrating the contributions of women to knowledge in New Zealand. Fitzgerald has been called one of the 'founding scholars' of medical anthropology in New Zealand, alongside Julie Park.

== Selected works ==
- Fitzgerald, Ruth (2008). "Biological citizenship at the periphery: Parenting children with genetic disorders". New Genetics and Society. 27 (3): 251–266. doi:10.1080/14636770802326927.
- Fitzgerald, Ruth P., W. Murray Thomson, C. T. Schafer, and M. A. Loose. "An exploratory qualitative study of Otago adolescents' views of oral health and oral health care." The New Zealand Dental Journal 100, no. 3 (2004): 62–71.
- Fitzgerald, Ruth (2004). "The New Zealand health reforms: Dividing the labour of care". Social Science & Medicine. 58 (2): 331–341. doi:10.1016/S0277-9536(03)00201-6. PMID 14604619.
- Sussex, Philip V.; Thomson, W. Murray; Fitzgerald, Ruth P. (2009). "Understanding the 'epidemic' of complete tooth loss among older New Zealanders". Gerodontology. 27 (2): 85–95. doi:10.1111/j.1741-2358.2009.00306.x. PMID 19555356.
