= 150 women in 150 words =

List of women who contributed to knowledge in New Zealand

The "150 women in 150 words" project was undertaken by the Royal Society Te Apārangi and published during their 150th anniversary celebrations in 2017. The aim of the project was "celebrating women's contributions to expanding knowledge in New Zealand", and involved short online biographies of a range of women from early Polynesian settlers to present-day scientists.

The biographies are arranged on the Royal Society Te Apārangi's website in four categories: pre-1866 (of which there are two, Whakaotirangi and Kahupeka), 1867–1917, 1918–1967, and 1968–to the present time. The full list of biographies below is arranged alphabetically by (most commonly used) surname.

Image	Name	Description	Date of birth	Date of death
	Nancy Adams	Botanist and botanical artist, and museum curator.	19 May 1926	27 May 2007
	Mary Aldis	Scientific author and social reform campaigner	1840	11 August 1897
	Catherine Alexander	Botanist, and the first known woman to publish a paper in the Royal Society Te Apārangi's Transactions in 1886.	8 December 1862	17 March 1928
	Elizabeth Alexander	Geologist, academic, and physicist, whose wartime work with radar and radio led to early developments in radio astronomy.	13 December 1908	15 October 1958
	Jan Anderson	Organic chemist who worked on photosynthesis.	12 May 1932	28 August 2015
	Innes Asher	Professor of paediatrics	20th Century	
	Rosemary Askin	Geologist specialising in Antarctic palynology and the first New Zealand woman to undertake her own research programme in Antarctica, in 1970.	1949	
	Paddy Bassett	Agricultural scientist, the first woman graduate from Massey Agricultural College, and also one of the first two women students accepted into Canterbury Agricultural College (now Lincoln University).	15 July 1918	20 July 2019
	Betty Batham	Marine biologist and university lecturer, who directed the Portobello Marine Biological Station at the University of Otago for more than 23 years.	2 December 1917	8 July 1974
	Muriel Bell	Nutritionist and medical researcher	4 January 1898	2 May 1974
	Helen Benson	Professor of home science.	25 January 1886	20 February 1964
	Patricia Bergquist	Zoologist specialising in sponges, anatomist and biologist	10 March 1933	9 September 2009
	Betty Bernardelli	Physiological psychologist who was the commanding officer at the WAAF training school for psychology instructors.	7 November 1919	1998
	Winifred Betts	Botanist and the first female lecturer at the University of Otago	1894	29 April 1971
	Judith Binney	Writer, academic, historian and educator	1 July 1940	15 February 2011
	Philippa Black	Geologist specialising in mineralogy and metamorphic petrology.	26 November 1941	
	Agnes Blackie	New Zealand's first female physics lecturer and probably the Southern Hemisphere's only female physics academic at the time of her appointment.	1897	1975
	Ellen Wright Blackwell	Writer, botanist, and photographer.	7 October 1864	24 February 1952
	Winifred Lily Boys-Smith	Science artist and lecturer, university professor, and school principal	7 November 1865	1 January 1939
	Janet M. Bradford-Grieve	Carcinologist and biological oceanographer.	1940	
	Margaret Bradshaw	Geologist and Antarctic researcher.	1941	
	Beryl Brewin	Marine zoologist, specialising in ascidians (sea squirts).	10 September 1910	1999
	Margaret Brimble	Chemist who has made investigations of shellfish toxins and means to treat brain injuries.	20 August 1961	
	Sally Brooker	Inorganic chemist	20th Century	
	Katherine Browning	Teacher, who published one of the only four papers by women in the Royal Society of New Zealand's Transactions before 1900.	1864	1946
	Carolyn Burns	Ecologist specialising in lakes.	3 February 1942	
	Ella Campbell	Botanist and expert on bryophytes, she published 130 scientific papers on liverworts, hornworts, orchids, and wetlands. She became the first woman faculty member of the Massey Agricultural College.	28 October 1910	24 July 2003
	Kathleen Campbell	Geologist, paleoecologist and astrobiologist	20th Century	
	Vivienne Cassie Cooper	Planktologist and botanist.	29 September 1926	5 July 2021
	Amy Castle	Entomologist and museum curator	9 May 1880	23 February 1971
	Alva Challis	Geologist who discovered the mineral Wairauite, and pioneered the use of x-rays for mineral investigation in New Zealand.	25 January 1930	21 November 2010
	Ann Chapman	Limnologist, one of the first New Zealand women scientists to visit Antarctica, and the first woman to lead a scientific expedition to Antarctica.	14 January 1937	23 May 2009
	Emma Cheeseman	Scientific painter and taxidermist, whose work is in the Auckland Museum	4 November 1846	2 October 1928
	Marie Clay	Academic, clinical psychologist, researcher distinguished researcher known for her work in global educational literacy.	3 January 1926	13 April 2007
	Helen Connon	First woman in the British Empire to win any university degree with honours.	1860	22 February 1903
	Lucy Cranwell	Botanist responsible for groundbreaking work in palynology, and curator of botany at Auckland Museum.	7 August 1907	8 June 2000
	Marguerite Crookes	Botanical enthusiast, pteridologist and conservationist, author, and founder of the Auckland Natural History Club.	1898	24 January 1991
	Margaret Cruickshank	New Zealand's first registered female doctor	1 January 1873	28 November 1918
	Kathleen Curtis	Mycologist and a founder of plant pathology in New Zealand.	15 August 1892	5 September 1994
	Helen Dalrymple	Botanist, author and school teacher who wrote two books on Otago flora.	1883	1943
	Janet Davidson	Archaeologist who has carried out extensive field work in the Pacific Islands.	1941	
	Michelle Dickinson	Nanotechnologist and science educator.	20th Century	
	Joan Dingley	Mycologist who was the head of mycology at the DSIR Plant Disease Division.	14 May 1916	1 January 2008
	Alison Downard	Chemist focusing on surface chemistry, electrochemistry and nanoscale grafted layers	20th Century	
	Audrey Eagle	Writer, botanist and botanical illustrator, who was author and illustrator of the two volume Eagle's Complete Trees and Shrubs of New Zealand.	1925	
	Elizabeth Edgar	Botanist, author and editor of three of the five volumes of the series Flora of New Zealand.	27 December 1929	1 January 2019
	Kate Edger	University graduate, educationalist, community worker. The first woman in New Zealand to gain a university degree, and possibly the second in the British Empire to do so.	6 January 1857	6 May 1935
	Kate Violet Edgerley	Botanist and teacher	21 February 1887	26 February 1939
	Edith Farkas	Antarctic researcher known for being the first Hungarian woman and also the first New Zealand MetService female staff member to set foot in Antarctica. She conducted world-leading ozone monitoring research for over 30 years.	13 October 1921	3 February 1993
	Sarah Featon	Botanical artist and author, who with her husband published The Art Album of New Zealand Flora.	1848	28 April 1927
	Ruth Fitzgerald	Anthropology academic	1956	
	Elizabeth Alice Flint	Botanist who specialised in freshwater algae, and co-authored the three-volume series Flora of New Zealand Desmids in the 1980s and 1990s.	26 May 1909	7 December 2011
	Caroline Freeman	Teacher, school principal and owner, and the first female graduate of the University of Otago, New Zealand.	c.1856	16 August 1914
	Constance Frost	Medical doctor, bacteriologist and pathologist.	23 June 1862	29 January 1920
	Marion Fyfe	Academic, specialising in taxonomy of planarians and other flatworms, the first woman zoology lecturer at the University of Otago, and the first woman to be elected to the Council of the Royal Society Te Apārangi.	1897	1986
	Juliet Gerrard	Chemist and New Zealand Prime Minister's Chief Science Advisor.	20th Century	
	Bessie Te Wenerau Grace	First Māori woman university graduate, nun, and educator.	1889	1944
	Jane Harding	Academic new-born intensive case specialist (neonatologist)	1955	
	Aroha Harris	Historian and writer, specialising in Māori histories of policy and community development	20th Century	
	Emily Cumming Harris	Teacher and artist, and one of New Zealand's first professional women painters.	28 March 1837	5 August 1925
	Jennifer Hay	Linguist who specialises in sociolinguistics, laboratory phonology, and the history of New Zealand English	1968	
	Harlene Hayne	Psychology professor and first female vice-chancellor of the University of Otago.	1961	
	Elizabeth Herriott	Scientist and the first woman appointed to the permanent teaching staff at Canterbury College.	1882	13 March 1936
	Barbara Heslop	Immunologist specialising in transplantation immunology and immunogenetics.	26 January 1925	20 December 2013
	Rangimārie Hetet	Tohunga raranga (master weaver) of Ngāti Maniapoto	24 May 1892	14 June 1995
	Georgina Burne Hetley	Artist and author, her book The Native Flora of New Zealand was published in English and French.	27 May 1832	29 August 1898
	Avice Hill	Entomologist and herb grower.	1906	2001
	Miss Hirst	Astronomical observer who published significant observations of Jupiter	19th Century	Unknown
	Eliza Amy Hodgson	Botanist who specialised in liverworts.	10 October 1888	7 January 1983
	Janet Holmes	Sociolinguist working on language and gender, language in the workplace, and New Zealand English.	17 May 1947	
	Ngapare Hopa	Māori academic of Waikato Tainui descent	20th Century	30 April 2024
	Alice Woodward Horsley	First registered woman doctor in Auckland.	3 February 1871	7 November 1957
	Philippa Howden-Chapman	Clinical psychologist and public health researcher	20th Century	
	Margaret Hyland	Chemist, engineer and professor.	1960	
	Alison Jones	Academic working on sociology of education.	1955	
	Kahupeka	Māori healer and pioneer of herbal medicine	15th Century	Unknown
	Thelma Kent	Photographer	21 October 1899	23 June 1946
	Elsa Kidson	Soil scientist and sculptor	18 March 1905	25 July 1979
	Martha King	New Zealand's first resident botanical illustrator. She was a founder of schools in Whanganui and New Plymouth, and a talented gardener and schoolteacher.	1803	31 May 1897
	Judith Kinnear	Academic, geneticist, and the first woman to head a New Zealand university	12 May 1939	
	Pat Langhorne	Antarctic sea ice researcher	1955	
	Wendy Larner	Geographer and social scientist who has focussed on the interdisciplinary areas of globalisation, governance and gender.	2 March 1963	
	Diana Lennon	Academic and pediatrician, specialising in infectious diseases.	3 October 1949	15 May 2018
	Janice M. Lord	Botanist and plant evolutionary biologist	20th Century	
	Elsie Low	Botanist, teacher and temperance campaigner.	25 July 1875	14 February 1909
	Averil Margaret Lysaght	Biologist, science historian and artist, best known for her scholarly work on Joseph Banks	14 April 1905	21 August 1981
	Bella MacCallum	Botanist and mycologist, and New Zealand's first female doctor of science	1886	17 March 1927
	Tracey McIntosh	Sociology and criminology academic	20th Century	
	Ruth Mason	Botanist specialising in the taxonomy and ecology of freshwater plants.	7 November 1913	14 May 1990
	Kāterina Mataira	Māori language advocate, artist and writer	13 November 1932	16 July 2011
	Lisa Matisoo-Smith	Molecular anthropologist	1963	
	Joan Mattingley	Clinical chemist and author	1926	27 July 2015
	Marjorie Mestayer	Conchologist, and conchology curator for the Dominion Museum in Wellington.	1880	7 July 1955
	Joan Metge	Social anthropologist, educator, lecturer and writer.	21 February 1930	
	Pérrine Moncrieff	Ornithologist, conservationist, and author	8 February 1893	16 December 1979
	Lucy Beatrice Moore	Botanist and ecologist	14 July 1906	9 June 1987
	Rina Winifred Moore	First female Māori medical doctor.	6 April 1923	1975
	Flora Murray	Botanist, and second woman appointed as permanent staff at Canterbury University College.	1 August 1896	1968
	Margaret Mutu	Ngāti Kahu leader, author and academic	20th Century	
	Phoebe Myers	Teacher and educational reformer. She was one of the first women to teach science at college level in New Zealand, and the first woman to represent her country at the League of Nations.	13 June 1866	2 June 1947
	Sheila Natusch	Writer and freelance illustrator.	14 February 1926	10 August 2017
	Wendy Nelson	Botanist and phycologist, New Zealand's leading authority on seaweeds.	1954	
	Hinke Maria Osinga	Mathematician and an expert in dynamical systems, also a creator of mathematical art.	25 December 1969	
	Roka Paora	Māori language expert, translator, author and educator.	15 February 1925	15 January 2011
	Mākereti Papakura	Tūhourangi woman of mana, guide, entertainer, and ethnographer.	20 October 1873	16 April 1930
	Kim Pickering	Composite materials engineer	20th Century	
	Suzanne G Pitama	Psychologist and indigenous health researcher	20th Century	
	Josephine Gordon Rich	Zoologist and one of only four women who published results of her scientific work in New Zealand before 1901	1866	6 September 1940
	Jane Ritchie	Psychology academic and expert of child-raising, she was the first woman to graduate with a PhD in psychology from a New Zealand university.	20th Century	
	Joan Robb	Zoologist, professor and curator	1921	19 October 2017
	Marion Robinson	Nutritionist and physiologist, particularly noted for her investigation of the importance of selenium in the human diet.	1923	2003
	Viviane Robinson	Educational psychologist	20th Century	
	Jacinta Ruru	Law professor and the first Māori Professor of Law.	1974	
	Anne Salmond	Anthropologist and historian	16 November 1945	
	Hope Sanderson	Geologist, and the first New Zealand woman to graduate with MSc with Honours in Geology at a New Zealand university.	1925	2016
	Rosa Olga Sansom	Teacher, museum director, botanist, broadcaster, and writer.	3 June 1900	1 July 1989
	Caroline Saunders	Economist and researcher, specialising in environmental economics	20th Century	
	Martha K. Savage	Geology academic.	20th Century	
	Brenda Shore	Botanist, one of only 20 female Associate Professors in New Zealand when she retired in 1983.	1922	1993
	Emily Hancock Siedeberg-McKinnon	Medical practitioner, hospital superintendent, and the country's first female medical graduate.	17 February 1873	13 June 1968
	Cather Simpson	Physicist/chemist and entrepreneur	20th Century	
	Liz Slooten	Marine biologist	20th Century	
	Anne Briar Smith	Children's rights researcher and academic	13 August 1940	22 May 2016
	Linda Tuhiwai Smith	Academic who has made a major contribution to research methods in social justice research.	1950	
	Jane Soons	Geomorphologist and the first woman professor at the University of Canterbury, and possibly the first in New Zealand.	1931	8 September 2020
	Greta Stevenson	Botanist and mycologist, who described many new species of Agaricales (gilled mushrooms).	10 June 1911	18 December 1990
	Evelyn Stokes	Historical geographer who worked in the Waitangi Tribunal.	5 December 1936	15 August 2005
	Vida Stout	Limnographer and academic administrator, first woman to be Dean of Science at a New Zealand university.	20 February 1930	21 July 2012
	Jean Struthers	Botany student in New Zealand and an inspirational chemistry teacher in England and New Zealand	1899	2002
	Lydia Suckling	Botanist and school teacher.	1890	1979
	Mary Sutherland	Forester and botanist.	4 May 1893	11 March 1955
	Miraka Szászy	Māori leader and academic, making significant contributions in education, broadcasting, social welfare and small business development.	7 August 1921	20 December 2001
	Merryn Tawhai	Physics professor, she is known for the development of mathematical models of the lungs that will help scientists understand differences between physiologically normal lungs and the pathological changes that might occur in a disease.	20th Century	
	Grace Marie Taylor	Botanist, mycologist and scientific illustrator	28 April 1930	24 April 1999
	Ngahuia Te Awekotuku	Academic, short story writer and essayist	1949	
	Margaret Tennant	Historian	1952	
	C. Jean Thompson	Statistician and author, who served as president of the New Zealand Statistical Association.	1940	
	Beatrice Tinsley	Astronomer and cosmologist, whose research made fundamental contributions to the astronomical understanding of how galaxies evolve, grow and die.	27 January 1941	23 March 1981
	Colleen Ward	Cross-cultural psychologist	19 August 1952	
	Joyce Watson	Chemist specialising in fruit disorders and trace elements.	5 July 1918	28 September 2004
	Lydia Wevers	Literary historian and critic, editor and book reviewer.	19 March 1950	4 September 2021
	Whakaotirangi	Māori experimental gardener and early New Zealand scientist	14th Century	Unknown
	Joan Wiffen	Paleontologist	4 February 1922	30 June 2009
	Philippa Wiggins	Biochemist and physical chemist, who made significant contributions to the understanding of the structure of water in living cells.	16 July 1925	16 March 2017
	Siouxsie Wiles	Microbiologist and science communicator	20th Century	
	Christine Coe Winterbourn	Pathologist and researcher of the biological chemistry of free radicals.	20th Century	
	Mimie Wood	Secretary, accountant and librarian	1888	1979
	Ann Wylie	Botanist	1922	
	Aroha Yates-Smith	Performer and social scientist, researching forgotten Māori female deities	20th Century	
	Pamela Young	First New Zealand woman to live and work in Antarctica	1930s	
