= Kevin Downard =

Australian academic scientist

Kevin Downard is a British-Australian academic scientist whose research specialises in the improving responses to infectious disease through the application and development of mass spectrometry and other molecular approaches in the life and medical sciences. Downard has over 35 years of experience in the field and has written 150 lead-author scientific peer-reviewed journal publications, and two books including a textbook for the Royal Society of Chemistry and the first book to be published on the role of mass spectrometry in the study of protein interactions.

== Education ==
Downard was awarded his Ph.D. degree from the University of Adelaide in South Australia where he received the inaugural Donald Stranks fellowship.

== Career ==
A major focus of his research is to arrest the impact of infectious disease causing viruses. For over 25 years, he has led the development of new mass spectrometry, bioinformatics and computer-aided approaches to characterise respiratory viruses and is an international leader in this field. He has developed approaches to type, subtype, study the lineage, antigenicity, and evolution of the influenza virus and other respiratory biopathogens, including SARS CoV-2, and has identified and investigated the molecular basis of new antiviral enzyme inhibitors, to help arrest the impact of infectious diseases on human health. His laboratory led Australia's response to the SARS-CoV2 virus with mass spectrometry from 2020.

Downard held a post-doctoral fellowship from 1991 at the Massachusetts Institute of Technology (MIT) to advance protein sequencing by tandem mass spectrometry. He led the laboratory's early implementation of electrospray ionization (ESI) on a high end, four sector mass spectrometer and investigated subtleties of tandem mass spectra to help advance this application He remained at MIT as the Assistant Director of the former National Institutes of Health Mass Spectrometry Research Resource at MIT before leading his own research laboratories in the United States and Australia for almost 30 years. During this time, he has developed new proteotyping approaches to study viruses, viral proteins, and protein structures and interactions more generally to advance the application of MS in biology and medicine. In recent years, he has developed a new mass (i.e. numbers) based molecular phylogenetics approach (referred to as "phylonumerics") that avoids the need for sequence data or sequence alignments and has been applied to a range of evolutionary biology applications.

His laboratory was the first to demonstrate the preservation (in 1999) of large macromolecular complexes on conventional Matrix-assisted laser desorption/ionization (MALDI) targets for their indirect detection, later referred to as Intensity fading MALDI mass spectrometry by others. He also co-developed protein footprinting experiments, in the same year, employing radicals to study protein structures and was the first to apply the technique to study protein complexes.

== Honours and other service ==
Downard has been internationally recognised for his research having received awards from both American (ASMS 1999) and British Mass Spectrometry Society (in 2006). He has received four international fellowships from the Australian Academy of Science and the Japan Society for the Promotion of Science. He convened and chaired the second Sir Mark Oliphant Conference on Proteomics in 2003 and the largest biennial Australian mass spectrometry conference in 2009 after serving on the Executive MS Committee for 7 years. He has been active in promoting the importance of research in his field and the history of mass spectrometry and its pioneers for which he received the Moran award from the Australian Academy of Science in 2006. His activities have been highlighted in scientific journals in the analytical sciences, scientific web resources, and in the media including interviews with the Australian Broadcasting Corporation (ABC Australia). He has served on a range of national science, expert panel and professional society committees. He held the role of Biotechnology Program Director for almost a decade and was a founding executive member and advisor to the Sydney Emerging Infectious Disease and Biosecurity Institute. He has collaborated with a range of industry partners in the biotechnology and analytical science sector.
