= Betty Bernardelli =

Psychologist

Betty Margaret Bernardelli
- Born: Betty Margaret Giles; 7 November 1919
- Died: 1998 (aged 78–79)
- Occupation: Physiological psychologist
- Spouse: Harro Bernardelli

Betty Margaret Bernardelli (née Giles, 7 Nov 1919–1998) was a physiological psychologist at the University of Otago in New Zealand. With an MA from Cambridge University, Bernardelli was the commanding officer at the WAAF training school for psychology instructors. After the war, Bernardelli worked in a team advising demobilised air force personnel on their future employment prospects, and set up a testing unit for the Royal Navy. Bernardelli was also part of a research team in Cambridge, focusing on about how best to assist men and women aged 35–40 forced to change their occupation.

== Work ==
Arriving in New Zealand on the Rangitata in 1948 to take up a position as assistant lecturer in experimental psychology, Bernardelli was part of a group of immigrants who complained publicly about the conditions on board during the voyage.

Whilst in Dunedin, Bernardelli published a study on the decline in intelligence in New Zealand school children. After extensive interviews, she determined that intelligence had declined 1.43 points in a generation. This was a lesser decline than had been detected in England, a finding which did not surprise Bernadelli, who explained: "on the one hand, differentials in family restriction are so far less pronounced in New Zealand, and selectiveness of migration, on the other hand, makes the hypothesis that New Zealand was able to start its recent history with a comparatively small quota of prolific, but dull, backward, and feeble-minded stock appear likely."

Bernardelli joined the Psychology Department of the University of Auckland as a Senior Lecturer in 1962, and led the behavioural science programme from 1976.

== Personal life ==
Bernardelli married her German husband Harro Bernardelli, an economics lecturer at the University of Otago; he had also been a passenger on the Rangitata.

Betty Bernardelli died in 1998.

== Awards and honours ==
In 2017, she was selected as one of the Royal Society of New Zealand's "150 women in 150 words".
