= Avice Hill =

New Zealand entomologist

Avice Hill (née Hamilton 1906–2001) was a New Zealand entomologist and herb grower.

== Biography ==
Born in Christchurch, Hill attended St Margaret's School and then earned her BSc from Canterbury University College in 1931, and MSc in 1932. Her Masters thesis was on the morphology and life history of Archichauliodes diversus, commonly called the New Zealand dobsonfly.

Appointed to the Entomology Section of the Plant Research Bureau of DSIR, Hill worked in Palmerston North until 1937, when she moved to the Cawthron Institute in Nelson. Whilst there, Hill presented her work on the insects affecting cocksfoot crops, including the cocksfoot stem-borer, the midge, and others to the Royal Society of New Zealand in Wellington.

In the 1950s, Hill inherited family property on Memorial Avenue in Christchurch. After a visit to Sissinghurst Castle in England with her husband Frank, Hill decided to establish a herb nursery. She soon became a local authority on herb growing, and planted 150 varieties of herb and flowering plants.

Hill donated her property to what is now the Christchurch City Council, as the Avice Hill Community Reserve and Arts and Crafts Centre. With Peggy Fitts and one other person, Hill formed the Canterbury Herb Society in 1968, who still maintain the collection at 395 Memorial Avenue.

A variety of lavender was named after Hill, for her great love of the plant: Lavandula angustifolia "Avice Hill".

In 1997, Hill received a Christchurch Civic Award for her work in the arts and crafts community. In 2017 Avice Hill was selected as one of the Royal Society of New Zealand's "150 women in 150 words", celebrating the contributions of women to knowledge in New Zealand.

== Publications ==
- Hamilton, A. 1934: Codling moth in Canterbury. An investigation into the life-history and habits of the codling moth during the season 1932-33. N.Z. J. SCI. TECHNOL.: 16(1):1-8
- Hamilton, A. 1940: The New Zealand dobson-fly (Archichauliodes diversus Walk.): life history and bionomics. N.Z. J. SCI. TECHNOL. SECT. A: 22:44-55
- Hamilton, A. 1944: Coleophora spissicornis Haw., the clover case-bearer in New Zealand. N.Z. J. SCI. TECHNOL. SECT. A: 25:269-273
- Hamilton, A. 1944: The clover case-bearer: insect injurious to white clover seed. N.Z. J. AGRIC.: 68:339-340
- Hamilton, A. 1947: Ryegrass attacked by wheat sheath miner. N.Z. J. AGRIC.: 75:447
- Hamilton, A. 1948: Why the blackberries fail to ripen. N.Z. SCI. REV.: 6:33-34
- Hamilton, A. 1949: The blackberry mite (Aceria essigi). N.Z. J. SCI. TECHNOL. SECT. A: 31(2):42-45
- Hamilton, A. 1952: Codling moth investigations in Nelson, 1948-1949. N.Z. J. SCI. TECHNOL. SECT. A: 33(5):90-97
