= Ellen Blackwell =

Writer, botanist, photographer

Ellen Wright Blackwell
- Born: Ellen Wright Blackwell; 7 October 1864; Northampton, England
- Died: 24 February 1952 (aged 87); Portsmouth, England
- Spouse: Thomas Maidment
- Writing career
- Pen name: E. W. Blackwell, Grace Winter
- Notable work: Plants of New Zealand

Ellen Wright Blackwell (7 October 1864 – 24 February 1952) was a writer and botanist who made a lasting impact on the field of botany in New Zealand. She was born in Northampton, Northamptonshire, England on 7 October 1864.

== Biography ==
=== Early life ===
Blackwell was born in Northampton to John and Anna Maria Blackwell, née Bumpus, the sixth daughter and ninth child of their eleven children. John Blackwell was a master hosier. Prior to her visit to New Zealand she wrote some religious books for children under the name "Grace Winter".

=== Visit to New Zealand ===
Blackwell came to New Zealand in 1904 to visit her two brothers William and Frank, who had emigrated to New Zealand previously. Robert Malcolm Laing, who was Blackwell's co-author on the Plants of New Zealand, was a passenger on the Omrah, the ship upon which Blackwell was travelling. Laing joined the ship at Naples. The two travellers discovered their common interest in plants and went ashore together at some of the ports of call. A friendship was established and after the ship reached New Zealand in 1904 they remained in touch.

=== Plants of New Zealand ===
After arriving in Auckland, Blackwell visited her brother Frank, a keen photographer, at Pahi in January 1904. She remained in New Zealand for three more summers, visiting other areas, then with Laing set out to produce Plants of New Zealand. This book was first published in 1906 under the joint authorship of Laing and Blackwell, with 160 original photographs by Blackwell and her brother Frank. It was the first time a popular, well-illustrated and authoritatively-written account of New Zealand plants had been published. Several generations of people interested in New Zealand's native plants were to use it as a constant reference book and a number of professional botanists would credit it with stimulating their original interest. It is a classic in New Zealand literature on biology. The book is also notable in that it attempts to integrate for the first time aspects of New Zealand culture (including Maori) into a botanical framework. First published in 1906 by Whitcombe and Tombs with a second revised edition in 1907 and third (1927) and fourth (1940) editions revised by Laing. There was a fifth edition in 1949 and a reprinted "sixth edition" in 1957. A seventh edition was revised by Eric Godley and the publishers remained Whitcombe and Tombs.

=== Controversy ===
There has been some debate among academics concerning the relative contribution of the two authors to Plants of New Zealand.

=== Later life and death ===
Blackwell went back to England shortly after the book was published and never returned to New Zealand. In London on 14 October 1910 Blackwell married Thomas Maidment. She wrote two further religious books for children which were published in 1923 and 1926. She died in Portsmouth on 24 February 1952.

In 2017, Blackwell was selected as one of the Royal Society Te Apārangi's 150 women in 150 words, celebrating the contribution of women to knowledge in New Zealand.
