= Helen Dalrymple =

New Zealand botanist, author and teacher (1883–1943)

- Born: Helen Kirkland Dalrymple; 1882 or 1883; Birmingham, England
- Died: 16 April 1943 (aged 60); Dunedin, New Zealand
- Scientific career
- Fields: Botany

Helen Kirkland Dalrymple (1882 or 1883 – 16 April 1943) was a New Zealand botanist, author and school teacher who wrote two books on Otago flora.

== Life ==
Dalrymple was born between Jan-Mar 1883 in Birmingham, the daughter of the Reverend and Mrs Alexander Milne Dalrymple. She emigrated to New Zealand with her family spending the majority of her childhood in the Catlins. She attended Otago Girls' High School and obtained a scholarship to attend from the University of Otago where she graduated with a Bachelor of Arts degree in 1906. Dalrymple subsequently found employment at Otago Girls High School in 1913 teaching Botany, Latin and English and continued teaching there until her retirement in 1938. Through her teaching career and her books she inspired other notable botanists such as Ella Orr Campbell and Eric Godley.

Dalrymple was also an active member of the Dunedin Naturalists' Field Club becoming its president on several occasions. It was due to her efforts that the Club continued in existence when, in 1915 and again in 1941, it was proposed the club be put into "recess".

Dalrymple undertook many field trips in and around Otago collecting specimens. She shared her specimens with scientists such as G. H. Cunningham who then used the same for their research. She also authored two books on fungi and orchids found in Otago. Dalrymple acknowledged the assistance of Kathleen Maisey Curtis in the production of her book on fungi. Dalrymple was also a keen artist and both her publications contained scientific illustrations and line drawings by her. Her field observation and illustration of the orchid species later described as Drymoanthus flavus in her book Orchid hunting in Otago is regarded as the first recorded reference to that species.

Dalrymple died in Dunedin on 16 April 1943, and was buried at Andersons Bay Cemetery.

In 2017, Dalrymple was selected as one of the Royal Society Te Apārangi's "150 women in 150 words", celebrating the contribution of women to knowledge in New Zealand.

== Publications ==
- Orchid hunting in Otago, New Zealand by H.K. Dalrymple (Dunedin New Zealand, Coulls, Somerville Wilkie., 1937)
- Fungus hunting in Otago by H. K. Dalrymple (Dunedin New Zealand, Coulls, Somerville Wilkie., 1940)
