= Philippa Wiggins =

New Zealand biochemist and physical chemist

- Born: 16 July 1925
- Died: 16 March 2017 (aged 91)
- Other name: Philippa Marion Glasgow
- Education: King's College London
- Known for: Advancing understanding of the structure of water
- Awards: FRSNZ
- Scientific career
- Fields: physical chemistry
- Workplaces: Royal Institution, University of Auckland, University of Canterbury, University of Otago
- Website: http://www.philippawiggins.com

Philippa Marion Wiggins (nee Glasgow) FRSNZ (16 July 1925 – 16 March 2017) was a New Zealand academic, who made significant contributions to the understanding of the structure of water in living cells.

== Academic career ==
Wiggins studied science at the University of Canterbury, but although she wanted to continue in physics, women at the university were not allowed to progress past stage one. Having switched to chemistry, Wiggins then won a scholarship to research at the Davy-Faraday Laboratory at the Royal Institution in London. She then completed a PhD at King's College London. Wiggins took time off to have a family and did not return to full-time work until the age of 48.

Upon returning to New Zealand, Wiggins worked at the University of Canterbury with Walter Metcalf from 1962–1966. After this she worked at the University of Otago, and began working on water in living cells.

Wiggins was awarded a Career Fellowship by the New Zealand Medical Research Council. From 1970, she continued her research in the Department of Medicine at the University of Auckland, as Professor of Membrane Physiology.

In 1994 Wiggins co-founded BiostoreNZ, which commercialised preservation and storage technology for cells. BiostoreNZ was later acquired by Genesis Research and Development. Wiggins worked as a research scientist for Genesis Research in 1997, and continued to publish until 2009. She held more than 40 patents.

Wiggins died in Auckland on 16 March 2017 aged 91.

== Research ==
Wiggins realised that water can exist in two different states, and that the existence of these states explains the way that living cells work, and has implications for DNA and protein structure.

== Awards ==
Wiggins was appointed a Fellow of the Royal Society Te Apārangi in 1991. She received a medal for her research from the Health Research Council of New Zealand.

In 2017 Wiggins was featured as one of the Royal Society Te Apārangi's 150 women in 150 words.

== Selected works ==
- Philippa Wiggins (9 January 2008). "Life depends upon two kinds of water". PLOS One. 3 (1) e1406. Bibcode:2008PLoSO...3.1406W. doi:10.1371/journal.pone.0001406. ISSN 1932-6203. PMC 2170473. PMID 18183287. Wikidata Q28471895.
- P M Wiggins (December 1990). "Role of water in some biological processes". Microbiological Reviews. 54 (4): 432–49. ISSN 0146-0749. PMC 372788. PMID 2087221. Wikidata Q24634733.
- P. M. Wiggins (1 July 2001). "High and low density intracellular water". Cellular and Molecular Biology. 47 (5): 735–744. ISSN 0145-5680. PMID 11728089. Wikidata Q30666358.
- Wiggins PM (1 June 1996). "High and low density water and resting, active and transformed cells". Cell Biology International. 20 (6): 429–435. doi:10.1006/cbir.1996.0054. ISSN 1065-6995. PMID 8963257. Wikidata Q34063844.
- Norris V; Alexandre S; Bouligand Y; et al. (1 August 1999). "Hypothesis: hyperstructures regulate bacterial structure and the cell cycle". Biochimie. 81 (8–9): 915–920. doi:10.1016/s0300-9084(99)00203-5. ISSN 0300-9084. PMID 10572306. Wikidata Q33779068.
- P M Wiggins; B A MacClement (1 January 1987). "Two states of water found in hydrophobic clefts: their possible contribution to mechanisms of cation pumps and other enzymes". International Review of Cytology. 108: 249–303. doi:10.1016/s0074-7696(08)61440-0. ISSN 0074-7696. PMID 2959632. Wikidata Q39483322.
- P M Wiggins; J Rowlandson; A B Ferguson (1 February 1999). "Preservation of murine embryos in a state of dormancy at 4 degreesC". American Journal of Physiology. 276 (2): C291-9. doi:10.1152/ajpcell.1999.276.2.c291. ISSN 0002-9513. PMID 9950755. Wikidata Q78020067.
- P. M. Wiggins (1 November 1965). "A kinetic study of the state of potassium in kidney tissue". Biochimica et Biophysica Acta. 109 (2): 454–466. doi:10.1016/0926-6585(65)90171-8. ISSN 0006-3002. PMID 5867547. Wikidata Q72659583.
- V. A. Knight; P. M. Wiggins; J. D. Harvey; J. A. O'Brien (1 August 1981). "The relationship between the size of mitochondria and the intensity of light that they scatter in different energetic states". Biochimica et Biophysica Acta. 637 (1): 146–151. doi:10.1016/0005-2728(81)90220-6. ISSN 0006-3002. PMID 7284354. Wikidata Q47279640.
