= Te Rangi Hiroa Medal =

Medal awarded by the Royal Society of New Zealand

The Te Rangi Hiroa Medal is a social sciences award given by the Royal Society of New Zealand Te Apārangi. The medal was established in 1996 and is named in memory of Te Rangi Hīroa, also known as Sir Peter Buck, a New Zealand medical practitioner, anthropologist and Director of the Bishop Museum in Hawaii in the first half of the 20th century.

It was initially granted annually. It is currently a biennial award. It is awarded for work in one of four disciplines: historical approaches to societal transformation and change; current issues in cultural diversity and cohesion; social and economic policy and development; and medical anthropology (this last discipline was added in 2006). It was formerly awarded for each discipline in rotation; starting in 2017, it is awarded in any of the four disciplines in each round.

Recipients are:

- 1997: Joan Metge
- 1998: not awarded
- 1999: Jack Vowles
- 2000: not awarded
- 2001: Erik Newland Olssen
- 2003: Greta Regina Aroha Yates-Smith
- 2005: Alistair John Cluny Macpherson
- 2007: not awarded
- 2009: Ian Pool
- 2011: Colleen Ward
- 2013: not awarded
- 2015: Ruth Fitzgerald
- 2017: Tracey McIntosh and Murray Cox
- 2019: Edwina Pio
- 2021: Linda Waimarie Nikora
- 2023: Clive Aspin
- 2025: Tahu Kukutai

== See also ==
- List of social sciences awards
