= Marguerite Crookes =

New Zealand botanical enthusiast, pteridologist and conservationist (1898–1991)

Marguerite Winifred Crookes (18 January 1899 – 26 January 1991) was a botanist and conservationist from New Zealand and founder of the Auckland Natural History Club. Her best known work is Plant Life in Maoriland: A Botanist’s Note Book.

== Early life ==
Crookes was born in Derbyshire, England, one of four children. Her family emigrated to New Zealand in 1906. She earned a B.A. and M.A. from Auckland University College. Her writing career began when she authored articles about native plants in the Auckland Star and the Lyttelton Times.

== Career and publications ==
In the 1920s, Crookes founded the Workers Education Association Natural History Club, which became the Auckland Natural History Club. Crookes' early newspaper articles were collected and published as Plant Life in Maoriland: A Botanist’s Note Book in 1926. She published articles on botany in the New Zealand Smallholder and the Auckland Botanical Society newsletter as well as academic articles in journals including the American Fern Journal. Her research on ferns led her to produce three new editions of New Zealand Ferns, first published in 1921 by H. B. Dobbie. In later life, she lectured on native plants at the Auckland Botanical Society and was a member of the Auckland Philosophical Society. She was also active in conservation, arguing against development that would have harmed areas around the Waitākere Ranges. Specimens that Crookes collected remain in the collections of the Museum of New Zealand (Te Papa Tongarewa).

== Awards and honours ==
In 2017, Crookes was selected as one of the Royal Society Te Apārangi's "150 women in 150 words", a project celebrating the contributions of women to knowledge in New Zealand.
