= Ann Wylie =

New Zealand botanist (1922–2024)

- Born: Ann Philippa Wylie; 12 April 1922; Wellington, New Zealand
- Died: 27 December 2024 (aged 102); Dunedin, New Zealand
- Occupation: Botanist
- Relatives: Cathy Wylie (niece)

Academic background
- Education: University of Otago
- Thesis: Vascular anatomy of New Zealand's malvaceous trees (1945)

Ann Philippa Wylie (12 April 1922 – 27 December 2024) was a New Zealand botanist. She was an associate professor at the University of Otago before her retirement in 1987.

== Early life and family ==
Wylie was born in Wellington on 12 April 1922, the daughter of surgeon David Storer Wylie, who survived the sinking of the SS Marquette in 1915, and his second wife, Isobel Edith Wylie (née Daplyn). She was educated at Nga Tawa Diocesan School near Marton, and went on to study at the University of Otago. She completed her Master of Science degree with first-class honours in botany in 1945, and a Diploma of Honours in zoology the following year.

Wylie began working at the Wheat Research Institute at Lincoln in November 1946, carrying out experimental and statistical work. Also in 1946, Wylie was awarded a postgraduate science scholarship by the University of New Zealand, to fund two years of overseas study.

== Academic career ==
In 1944, Wylie was completing her honours degree in the Department of Botany at the University of Otago when Professor John Holloway retired suddenly through ill health. Alongside Betty Batham, Margaret Cookson and Brenda Shore, Wylie took up teaching to keep the department going. Wylie submitted her master's thesis, titled Vascular anatomy of New Zealand's malvaceous trees in 1945, while resident in St Margaret's College.

Wylie went to the University of London in 1947, and then lectured at the University of Manchester. Returning to New Zealand, she worked in the Department of Botany at the University of Otago, setting up courses on cytology and genetics, and teaching both zoology and botany students.

In an interview given in her nineties, Wylie recalled that "women were well accepted in zoology and botany and she did not experience prejudice, though she also notes that women lecturers behaved as ‘honorary men’; it was they who had to adapt rather than the men."

Wylie rose to associate professor before retiring in 1987.

In 2017, Wylie was selected as one of the Royal Society Te Apārangi's 150 women in 150 words. She celebrated her 100th birthday on 12 April 2022, and died in Dunedin on 27 December 2024, at the age of 102.

== Selected works ==
- Wylie, Ann Phillipa (1952). "The history of the garden Narcissi". Heredity. 6 (2): 137–156. doi:10.1038/hdy.1952.16. Wikidata Q56135524.
- Jean M. Armstrong; Wylie, Ann Phillipa (1965). "A New Basic Chromosome Number in the Family Fagaceae". Nature. 205 (4978): 1340–1341. doi:10.1038/2051340b0. Wikidata Q59080695.
- Wylie, Ann Phillipa (1954). "The History of Garden Roses (Masters Memorial Lecture, 1954.) With plates". Journal of the Royal Horticultural Society. 79: 8–24. ISSN 0035-8924. OCLC 760274491. Wikidata Q104605940.
- Wylie, Ann Phillipa; Darlington, Cyril Dean (1955), Chromosome Atlas of Flowering Plants, Allen & Unwin, OCLC 3473037, Wikidata Q104605923
- Wylie, Ann Phillipa (1945). Vascular anatomy of New Zealand's malvaceous trees: thesis presented for the degree of Master of Science in Botany, University of New Zealand (master's degree thesis). University of New Zealand. OCLC 154265405. Wikidata Q104606144.
- Wylie, Ann Phillipa (1957). "The chromosome numbers of mosses". Transactions of the British Bryological Society. 3: 260–278. ISSN 0068-1385. OCLC 66847866. Wikidata Q104606202.
