= Helen Benson =

New Zealand professor of home science

External image
- Portrait of Helen Rawson – Hocken Collections

Gertrude Helen Benson (née Rawson, 25 January 1886 – 20 February 1964) was a New Zealand professor of home science.

== Early life and education ==
Benson was born in Bradford, Yorkshire, England, on 25 January 1886, to Agnes Annie Cragg and her husband, Joseph Cordingley Rawson. Rawson was a cotton-spinner. Benson attended school in Bradford before embarking on the Natural Science Tripos through Newnham College.

Benson completed her BSc in natural sciences at Cambridge but didn't receive her degree until 1919, some years after finishing.

== University of Otago and international involvement ==
After completing a postgraduate diploma in household and social science from King's College, London, Benson was appointed as a lecturer in chemistry and household and social economics in the School of Home Sciences at the University of Otago from 1911.

When Professor Winifred Boys-Smith retired in 1920, Benson became Professor of Home Science and dean of the Faculty of Home Science. Benson married geology professor Noel Benson in December 1923, at his parents' home in Killara, New South Wales. After her marriage she resigned from her position at the university.

In 1920, after studying in the United States and Canada, Benson founded the New Zealand branch of the International Federation of University Women, and was its first president.

Benson was actively involved in the resettlement of refugees in New Zealand in the 1930s, and lectured on international affairs through the Workers' Educational Association.

From 1939 to 1948 she sat on the University of New Zealand Senate, and was involved in the National Council of Women of New Zealand, who she represented at an International Council of Women meeting in Paris in 1934.

Both Benson and her husband were members of the Society of Friends. Together they represented New Zealand at the 1925 Pan-Pacific Science Congress in Japan.

Benson died on 20 February 1964 in Dunedin, her husband having predeceased her in 1957. They had no children.

== Recognition ==
In 2017, she was selected as one of the Royal Society of New Zealand's "150 women in 150 words".
