= Intensity fading MALDI mass spectrometry =

Intensity-fading MALDI is a term coined to rename an existing method originally reported in 1999 to indirectly study a Protein–protein interaction or other protein complex and was the same year applied to a biological mixture to study the antigenicity of the influenza virus. It involves treating a protein and a potential binding partner with a site-specific endoproteinase with the binding sites identified by their reduced area (or intensity) in a MALDI mass spectrum compared to that of non-bound protein control. It was falsely reported as new and novel in a later application by a Spanish group. The true origins of the approach and a range of applications including those employing gel based separations, drug-protein interactions and the relative affinity of such interactions, are described in a review article.
