= Journal of Petrology =

- Discipline: Petrology
- Language: English
- Edited by: Georg Zellmer

Publication details
- History: 1960—present
- Publisher: Oxford University Press
- Frequency: Monthly
- Open access: Hybrid/Delayed
- Impact factor: 4.515 (2020)

Standard abbreviations
- ISO 4: J. Petrol.

Indexing
- CODEN: JPTGAD
- ISSN: 0022-3530 (print); 1460-2415 (web)

Links
- Journal homepage

The Journal of Petrology is a monthly peer-reviewed academic journal focused on the field of igneous and metamorphic petrology and petrogenesis. The journal is published by Oxford University Press and indexed in the Science Citation Index. The editor-in-chief is Georg Zellmer (University of Bonn).

== Abstracting and indexing ==
The journal is abstracted and indexed in:

- Aquatic Sciences and Fisheries Abstracts
- Chemical Abstracts
- CAB Abstracts
- Current Contents/Physical, Chemical and Earth Sciences
- GEOBASE
- ProQuest databases
- Science Citation Index

According to the Journal Citation Reports, the journal has a 2020 impact factor of 4.515.
