= Ella Campbell =

New Zealander botanist and bryologist (1910-2003)

Dame Ella Campbell DNZM
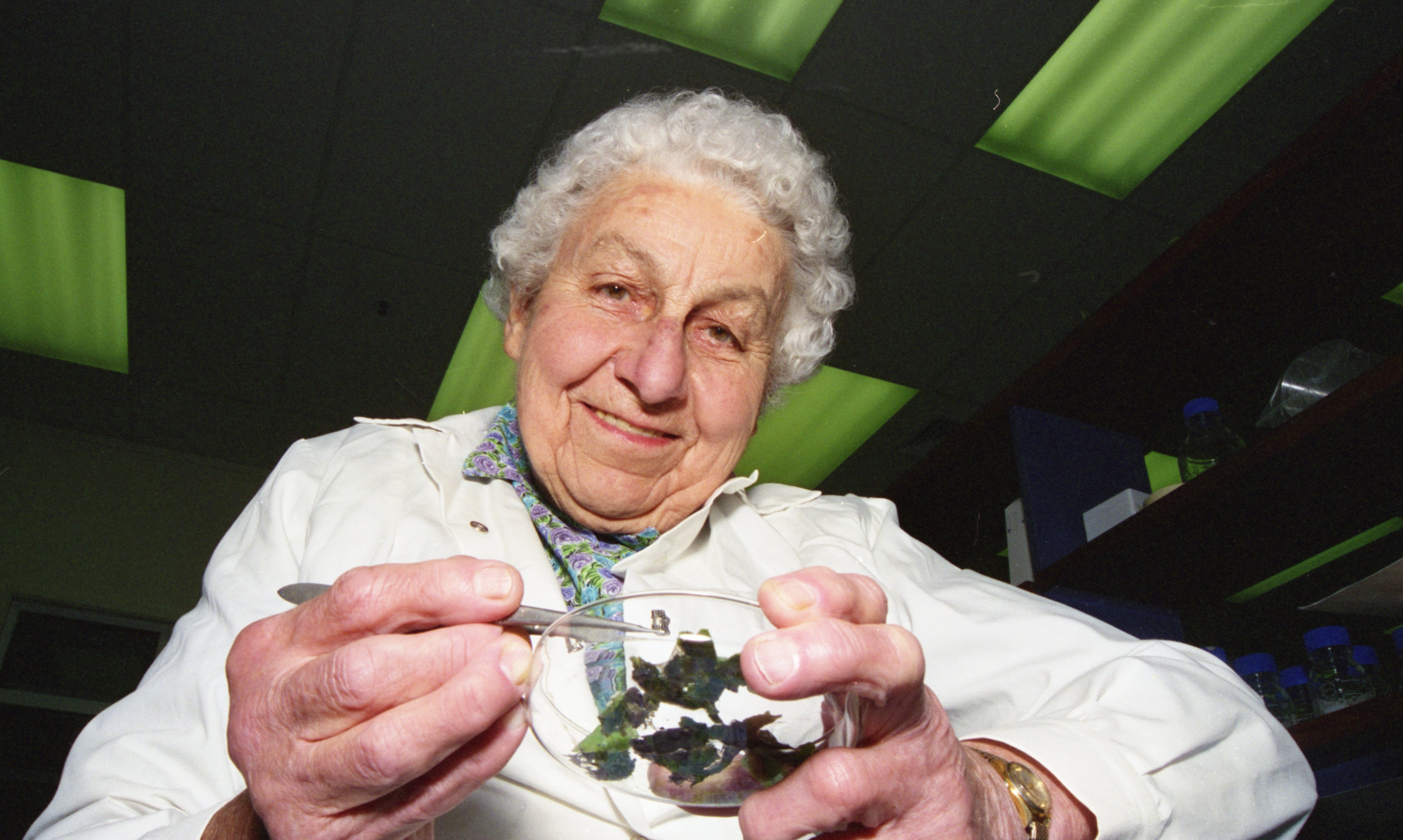
- Born: Ella Orr Campbell; 28 October 1910; Dunedin, New Zealand
- Died: 24 July 2003 (aged 92); Palmerston North, New Zealand
- Occupations: Botanist, university lecturer
- Parent(s): Orr Campbell; Agnes Campbell (née Kinder)

Dame Ella Orr Campbell DNZM (28 October 1910 – 24 July 2003) was a New Zealand botanist. An expert on bryophytes, she published 130 scientific papers on liverworts, hornworts, orchids, and wetlands. She became the first woman faculty member of the Massey Agricultural College (now Massey University) in 1945, and in 2003 the herbarium at Massey was renamed the Dame Ella Campbell Herbarium in her honour. Following her retirement from teaching in 1976, she continued to research and publish for another two decades, finally retiring in 2000 at the age of 90.

== Early life and education ==
Campbell was born in Dunedin to Orr Campbell, a building contractor, and Agnes (née Kinder) Campbell, the eldest of five children. Her mother had studied pharmacy at the University of Otago and her mother's sister Jane was one of the first women to attain a medical degree in New Zealand. Campbell attributed her interest in botany to walks that she had taken with her father as a child; she was also influenced by a family friend, botanist Helen Kirkland Dalrymple.

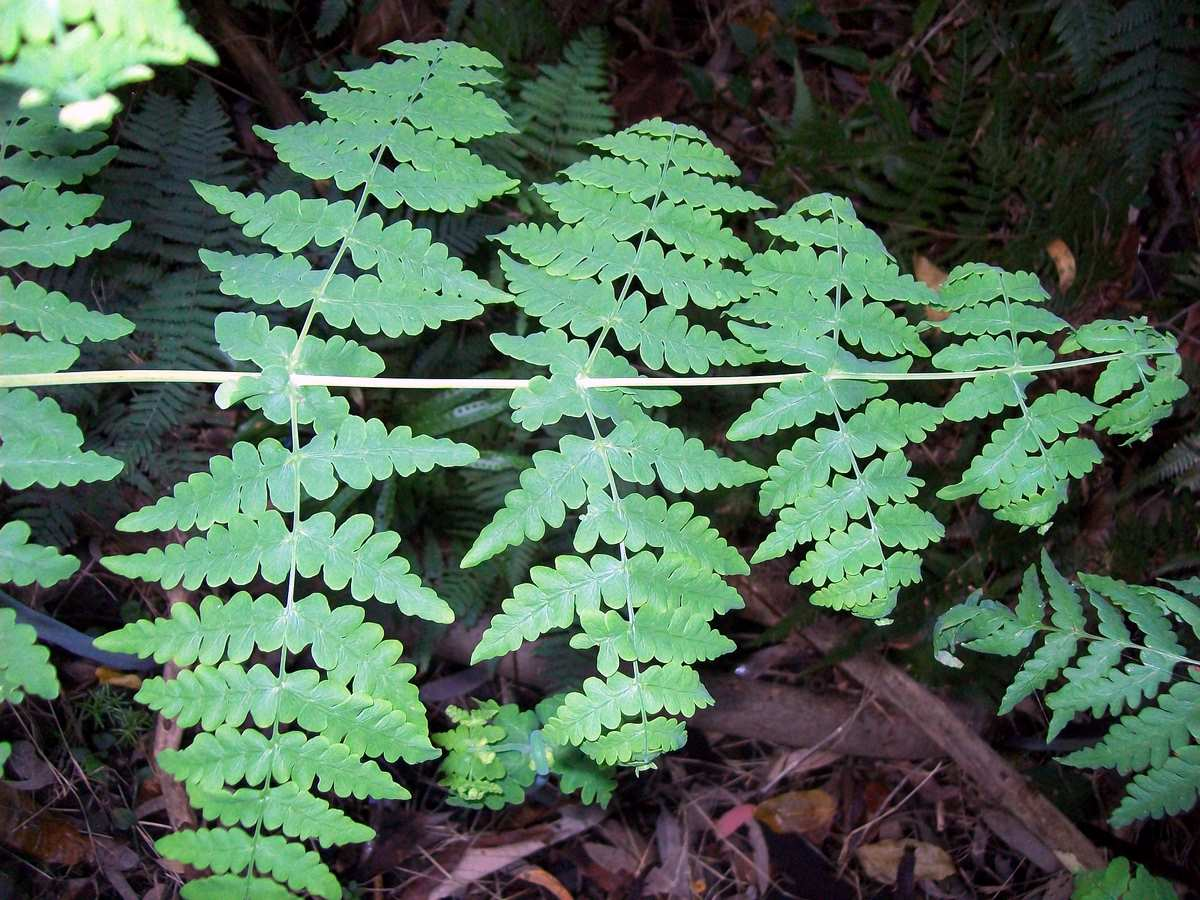
Histiopteris incisa fern

After graduating Otago Girls' High School, Campbell took a two-year course at Dunedin Teachers' Training College. At the same time, she enrolled at the University of Otago. She received her Diploma in Teaching in 1930. In 1931, she entered the department of botany at the University of Otago to study under John Ernest Holloway. She earned her master's degree in botany with first-class honours in 1934. Her thesis, "The embryo and stelar development of Histiopteris incisa", was published in Transactions of the Royal Society of New Zealand in 1936.

== Career ==
Upon graduation, Campbell taught at Waitaki Girls' High School in Oamaru for a year and then became an assistant botany lecturer at Victoria University of Wellington. In 1936 she returned to the University of Otago, now working alongside Holloway. She remained until 1944, when Holloway retired. She learned to speak German and delivered a lecture in that language at the Berlin Botanical Garden.

In March 1945 Campbell became the first woman faculty member of Massey Agricultural College (now Massey University). She lectured on plant morphology and anatomy and led research field trips to Himatangi Beach, Kapiti Island, and Tongariro National Park. Research projects included investigating mycorrhiza related to orchids and research on bryophytes, particularly the taxonomy and morphology of hornworts and of thalloid liverworts. She also conducted international field work, such as trips to the University of Cambridge, Singapore, India and Nepal; Australia; Malaysia; Japan; the United States; and Canada.

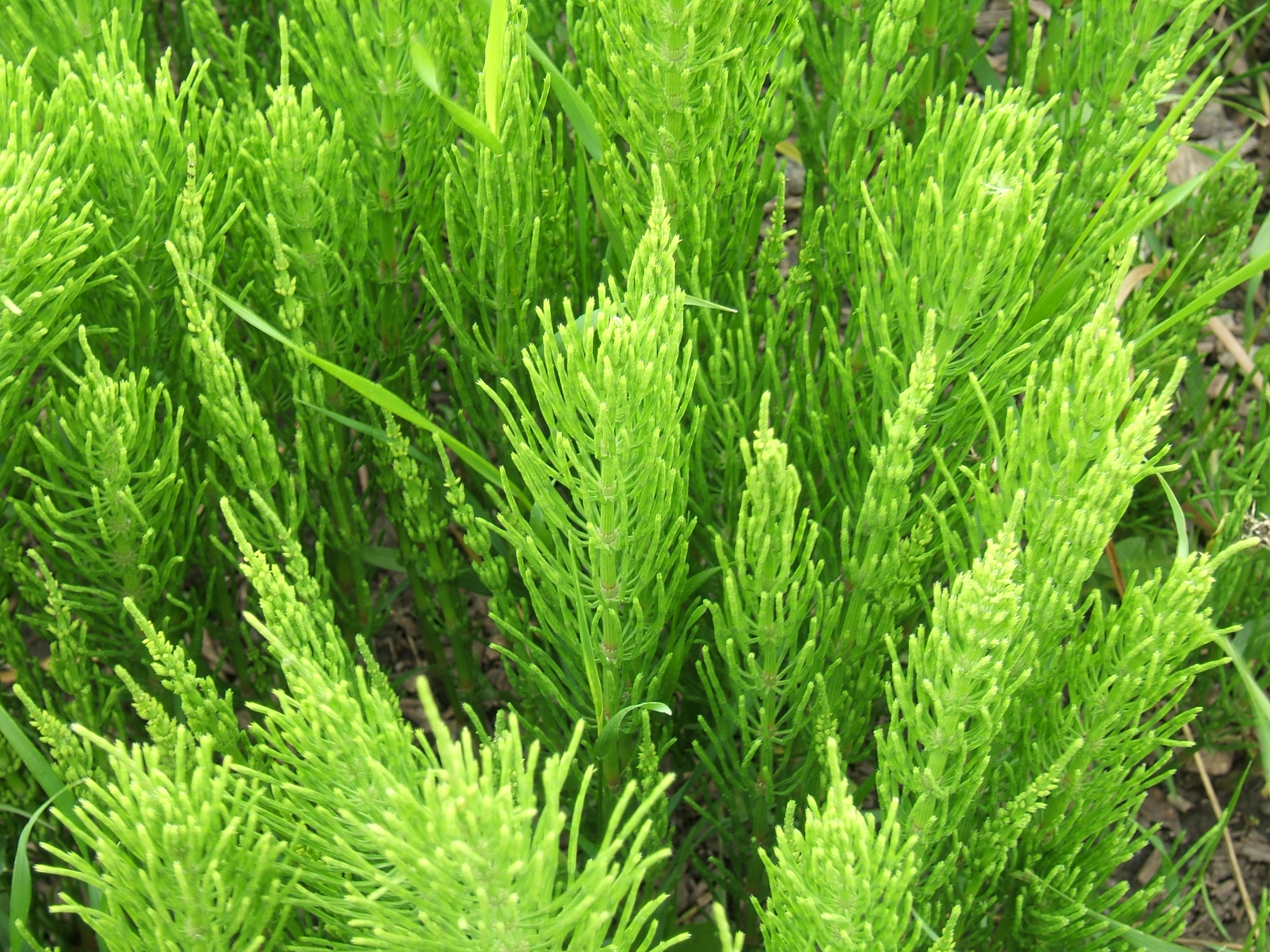
Equisetum arvense foliage

In 1976 the University of Otago awarded Campbell the degree Doctor of Science and she officially retired that year. However, she remained at the university in an honorary capacity and continued her research. Major publications during this period included work on the Metzgeriales and Marchantiales orders of liverwort, and several works on New Zealand hornworts that included an examination of details visible only under scanning electron and transmission electron microscopes.

In 1978 Campbell published her finding that the Equisetum arvense (field horsetail) growing on nursery land in Palmerston North was an invasive species, after years of others thinking that it was an ornamental plant. She also conducted research into the unique flora of peat bogs.

By her 80th birthday, Campbell had published many scientific papers on liverworts (37), orchids (14), wetlands (5), and other topics (10). She also wrote internationally acclaimed papers on the "mycorrhizal associations of New Zealand's achlorophyllous mycotrophic terrestrial orchids, Gastrodia cunninghamii, G. aff. sesamoides, G. minor, Molloybas cryptanthus and Danhatchia australis". She continued to research and publish as an honorary research associate for more than two decades, retiring in 2000 at age 90. On April 4, 2003, the herbarium that she had cultivated and helped expand at Massey was renamed the Dame Ella Campbell Herbarium at a ceremony which she attended.

== Other activities ==
She was a founding member of the Manawatu Orchid Society, and was a judge of the Orchid Council of New Zealand from 1978 until 2002. She was a member of the New Zealand Botanical Society and an Honorary Life Member of Soroptimists International, having been inaugural president of the Palmerston North chapter.

Campbell was a keen field hockey player from her university days. She played for the Dunedin Teachers' Training College team and captained both the New Zealand University team and the Otago Women's Hockey Team. She won three university blues, in 1931, 1933, and 1934. She helped start a women's hockey team in Palmerston North and coached the Massey University Women's Hockey Team. She was also a member of the New Zealand Women's Hockey Council.

== Honours and awards ==
Her most prominent awards included being appointed a Fellow of the Royal New Zealand Institute of Horticulture (1976), receiving the Massey Medal from Massey University (1992), and her appointment as a Dame Companion of the New Zealand Order of Merit, for services to science, in the 1997 New Year Honours. In 2017, Campbell was selected as one of the Royal Society Te Apārangi's "150 women in 150 words", celebrating the contributions of women to knowledge in New Zealand.

== Works ==
She co-authored with fellow Massey academic John Stuart Yeates the textbook Agricultural Botany (first published in 1954; second edition in 1960).

== Personal ==
Campbell never married, nor had children. She was diagnosed with breast cancer in 1980 and underwent a mastectomy. In June 2001 she left her home in Palmerston North for a retirement home, where she died on 24 July 2003, aged 92. Her ashes are interred with those of her family at Andersons Bay Cemetery, Dunedin.
