= C. Jean Thompson =

New Zealand statistician

- Born: 1940 (age 85–86)
- Occupations: Statistician, author
- Employer: DSIR

C. Jean Thompson (born 1940) is a New Zealand statistician who was president of the New Zealand Statistical Association from 1991 to 1993.

Because she was a girl, Thompson was prevented from taking any mathematical subjects in high school until the sixth form, when she was the top of her school's physics class. At university, she wanted to study statistics, but there was no program in that subject, so she enrolled into a bachelor's degree in mathematics and physics. She worked in the Department of Scientific and Industrial Research in its Applied Mathematics Division. She learned statistics on the job, and used an Elliott 503, the first scientific computer in New Zealand, to perform her analyses.

As president of the NZSA, she took the opportunity of the 1993 Women's Suffrage Centenary Celebration to collect and display material about women in statistics in New Zealand that was later collected into a book, Women with Maths — Making a difference. The book tells the stories of 40 New Zealand women for whom a knowledge of statistics or mathematics had enabled a career or lifestyle.

Thompson's publications with the Applied Mathematics Division concerned topics ranging from earthquakes to horticulture. The division was eliminated in the restructuring of the Department of Scientific and Industrial Research in 1992. Later, she went to work for the New Zealand Council for Educational Research, where she became a co-author of several books on childhood education.

== Recognition ==
In 2017, Thompson was selected as one of the Royal Society Te Apārangi's "150 women in 150 words", celebrating the contributions of women to knowledge in New Zealand.

== Selected publications ==
- Errol W. Hewett; C. Jean Thompson (1988), "Modified atmosphere storage for reduction of bitter pit in some New Zealand apple cultivars", New Zealand Journal of Crop and Horticultural Science, 16 (3): 271–277, doi:10.1080/03015521.1988.10425650, Wikidata Q106630060
- Errol W. Hewett; C.Jean Thompson (1992), "Modification of internal carbon dioxide and oxygen levels in apple fruit by postharvest calcium application and modified atmospheres", Postharvest Biology and Technology, 1 (3): 213–219, doi:10.1016/0925-5214(92)90004-9, Wikidata Q106630057
- Errol W. Hewett; C. Jean Thompson (1989), "Modified atmospheres during storage and transport for bitter pit reduction in 'Cox's Orange Pippin' apple", New Zealand Journal of Crop and Horticultural Science, 17 (3): 275–282, doi:10.1080/01140671.1989.10428044, Wikidata Q106630058
- Errol W. Hewett; C.Jean Thompson (1989), "Modified atmosphere storage and bitter pit reduction in 'Cox's Orange Pippin' apples", Scientia Horticulturae, 39 (2): 117–129, doi:10.1016/0304-4238(89)90084-8, Wikidata Q106630059
