= Mineralium Deposita =

- Discipline: Earth sciences
- Language: English
- Edited by: B. Lehmann, G. Beaudoin

Publication details
- History: 1967-present
- Publisher: Springer
- Frequency: 8/year
- Impact factor: 3.397 (2018)

Standard abbreviations
- ISO 4: Miner. Depos.

Indexing
- CODEN: MIDEBE
- ISSN: 0026-4598 (print); 1432-1866 (web)
- LCCN: 66009918
- OCLC no.: 960771118

Links
- Journal homepage

Mineralium Deposita, International Journal for Geology, Mineralogy and Geochemistry of Mineral Deposits is a peer-reviewed scientific journal published by Springer Science+Business Media. It is the official journal of the Society for Geology Applied to Mineral Deposits. The journal covers economic geology, experimental and applied geochemistry, mineral deposits research, and ore deposit exploration. The editors-in-chief are Georges Beaudoin (Université Laval) and Bernd Lehmann (Technical University of Clausthal). According to the Journal Citation Reports, the journal has a 2015 impact factor of 3.467. Mineralium Deposita is a hybrid open-access journal and publishes both subscription and open access articles.
