= Alison Downard =

Chemistry professor at the University of Canterbury in New Zealand

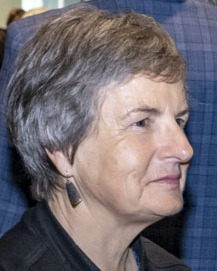
- Education: University of Otago
- Awards: Fellow of the Royal Society Te Apārangi, honorary degree from the University of Rennes 1
- Scientific career
- Fields: Chemistry
- Workplaces: University of Canterbury
- Thesis: Electron transfer reactions of organometallic clusters (1984)

Alison Joy Downard is a New Zealand academic, and has been a full professor at the University of Canterbury since 2009. Her work focuses on surface chemistry, electrochemistry and nanoscale grafted layers. She was elected a Fellow of the Royal Society Te Apārangi, has received the R. H. Stokes Medal, and was awarded an honorary degree from the University of Rennes 1.

== Education ==
Downard attended Te Puke High School. She went to Otago University to study home science but ended up graduating with a Bachelor of Science in electrochemistry in 1979 instead.

== Academic career ==
After a PhD titled Electron transfer reactions of organometallic clusters at the University of Otago, Downard moved to the University of Southampton, followed by a two-year postdoctoral associate position at UNC Chapel Hill from 1986. In 1988, she moved to the University of Canterbury, rising to full professor in 2009.

In 2017, Downard was featured as one of the Royal Society Te Apārangi's 150 women in 150 words.

Downard was a Principal Investigator at the MacDiarmid Institute for Advanced Materials and Nanotechnology. Her research on chemical modifications to surfaces at the nanoscale has enabled new electrodes to be discovered. Her findings have implications for energy storage. She collaborates with the Condensed Matter and Electroactive Systems (Matière condensée et systèmes électroactifs MaCSE) team at the University of Rennes 1 and frequently travels to Rennes for this research.

== Awards ==
In 2014, Downard was awarded the R. H. Stokes medal by the Royal Australian Chemical Institute. The same year she was elected as a Fellow of the Royal Society Te Apārangi, and received an honorary doctorate from the University of Rennes 1.

== Selected works ==
- Paula A Brooksby; Kelly H Anderson; Alison J Downard; Andrew D Abell (1 January 2010). "Electrochemistry of ferrocenoyl beta-peptide monolayers on gold". Langmuir. 26 (2): 1334–1339. doi:10.1021/la902402t. ISSN 0743-7463. PMID 19799404. Wikidata Q43268019.
- Frankie Rawson; Jacqueline Hicks; Nicholas Dodd; et al. (6 October 2015). "Fast, Ultrasensitive Detection of Reactive Oxygen Species Using a Carbon Nanotube Based-Electrocatalytic Intracellular Sensor". ACS Applied Materials & Interfaces. 7 (42): 23527–23537. doi:10.1021/acsami.5b06493. ISSN 1944-8244. PMC 4654508. PMID 26438964. Wikidata Q36303188.
- Lita Lee; Paula A. Brooksby; Yann R. Leroux; Philippe Hapiot; Alison J. Downard (22 February 2013). "Mixed monolayer organic films via sequential electrografting from aryldiazonium ion and arylhydrazine solutions". Langmuir. 29 (9): 3133–3139. doi:10.1021/la400303x. ISSN 0743-7463. PMID 23398449. Wikidata Q34582231.
- Samuel S C Yu; Emelyn S Q Tan; Reuben T Jane; Alison J Downard (27 September 2007). "An electrochemical and XPS study of reduction of nitrophenyl films covalently grafted to planar carbon surfaces". Langmuir. 23 (22): 11074–11082. doi:10.1021/la701655w. ISSN 0743-7463. PMID 17900158. Wikidata Q46978337.
- David J. Garrett; Benjamin S Flavel; Joseph G Shapter; Keith H R Baronian; Alison J Downard (1 February 2010). "Robust forests of vertically aligned carbon nanotubes chemically assembled on carbon substrates". Langmuir. 26 (3): 1848–1854. doi:10.1021/la902575w. ISSN 0743-7463. PMID 19788291. Wikidata Q43269725.
- Joanne Coyle; Alison J Downard; Jane Nelson; Vickie McKee; Charles J Harding; Regine Herbst-Irmer (30 June 2004). "Electrochemistry of a labile average-valence dicopper system". Dalton Transactions (15): 2357–2363. doi:10.1039/b405587j. ISSN 1477-9226. PMID 15278131. Wikidata Q44996229.
