= Jean Helen Thompson =

British statistician and demographer

Jean Helen Thompson CBE (2 December 1926 – 28 December 1992) was a British statistician and demographer who became chief statistician in the Office of Population Censuses and Surveys.

Thompson earned a degree in statistics at University College London, and began working for the Government Statistical Service in 1950. After moving through several other bureaus, she came to the General Register Office, the predecessor organisation to the Office of Population Censuses and Surveys, as its chief statistician in 1967. She also represented the UK on the United Nations Commission on Population and Development. She retired in 1986.

At the General Register Office, Thompson's main statistical concerns involved birth rates and immigration. However, she failed to foresee the end of the baby boom in the late 1960s and early 1970s. In the late 1970s, when Labour politician Richard Crossman's diaries were published posthumously, she was forced to sue the publisher for libel, for including claims that she was a member of a "Fascist nest" who had falsified statistics about ethnic minorities in Britain. The publishers could present no evidence that this was so, and were forced to apologise in court.

Thompson also served a term as president of the British Society for Population Studies. She was awarded the CBE on her retirement, "in recognition of her contributions both to the public service and to population studies".
