= Elizabeth Herriott =

New Zealand scientist and academic (1882–1936)

- Born: 1882; Rangiora, New Zealand
- Died: 13 March 1936 (aged 54); Christchurch, New Zealand
- Education: Canterbury University College
- Known for: First woman lecturer at Canterbury University College
- Scientific career
- Fields: Botany

Elizabeth Maude Herriott (1882 – 13 March 1936) was a New Zealand scientist and academic. She was the first woman appointed to the permanent teaching staff at Canterbury College, now the University of Canterbury.

== Education ==
Herriott was born in Canterbury in 1882. Her parents were David and Elizabeth Susannah Herriott. Herriott attended Christchurch East School and Christchurch Girls' High School, where she was head prefect in 1899. She won a scholarship to attend Canterbury College, and studied botany and chemistry there from 1900 to 1905. She graduated with a B.A. in 1904 and a M.A. in 1905. Her Master's research was on the leaf anatomy of Subantarctic Islands species, and involved the study of plants brought back from an expedition in 1903 by Leonard Cockayne.

== Career ==
On graduation Herriott took up teaching positions, initially at Rangi Ruru Girls' School and later at Kaikōura District High School.

In 1916, Herriott was appointed to an assistant lecturer position in the Department of Biology at Canterbury College. She was promoted to the position of lecturer in 1928, and held this position until her retirement in 1934.

Herriott was particularly interested in the unusual anatomical adaptations that plants made to better survive in harsh environments. Her published work included papers on fresh water crustacean, biographies of early botanists Joseph and John Armstrong, and the morphology of the seaweed Durvillaea (which was presented to the Philosophical Institute of Canterbury in 1921. Her most significant piece of work is considered to be her study of the development of the flora in the area of west Christchurch occupied by Hagley Park (which she also presented at the First New Zealand Science Congress in 1919). In this study she compared records of the plant life in the area in 1864 with later observations. She particularly noted the impact of land development such as the draining of a swamp in 1897 to create Lake Victoria, the introduction of non-native plants through ceremonial plantings by visiting dignitaries and the erection and destruction of buildings for the International Exhibition of 1906.

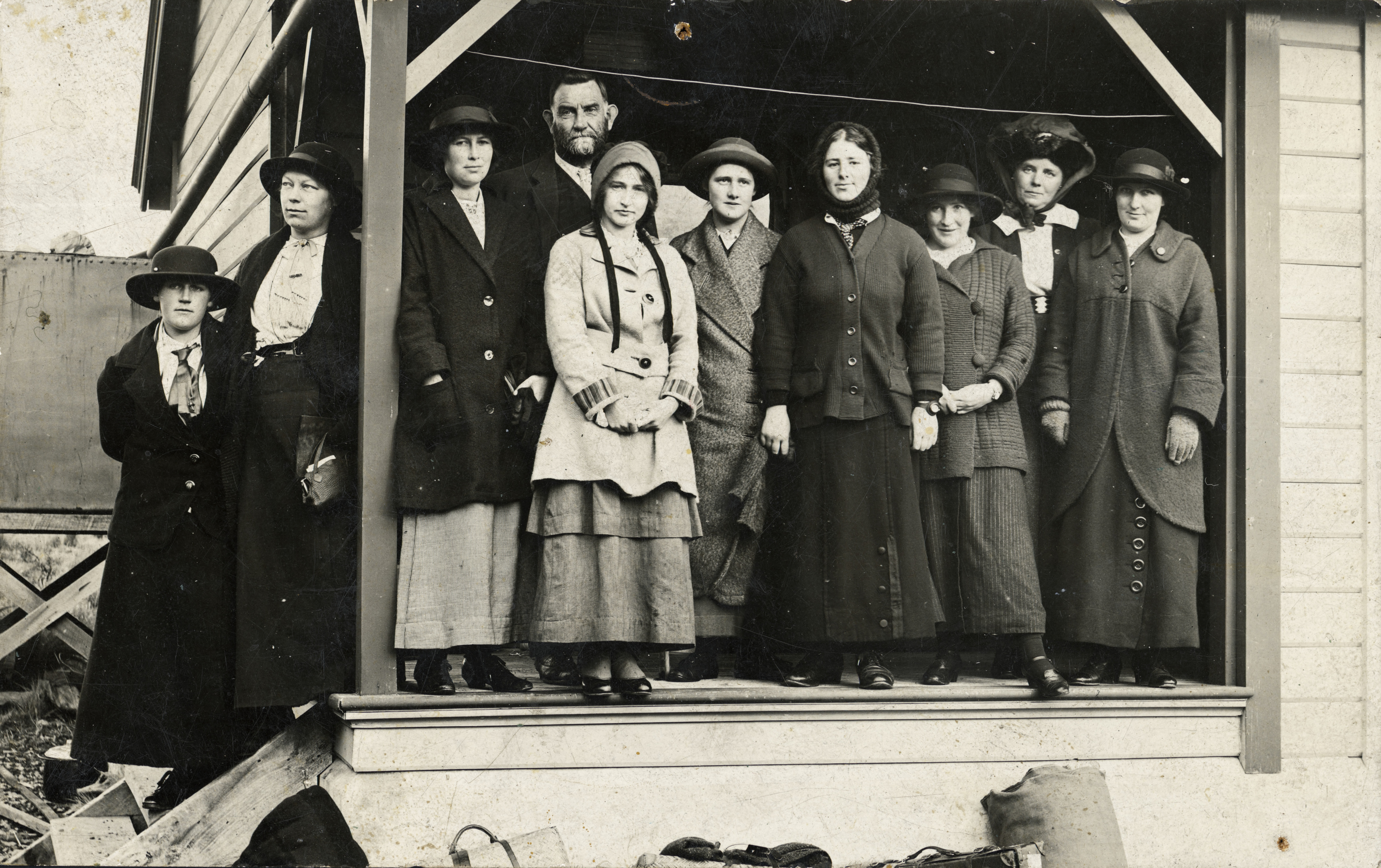
Charles Chilton and a group of unnamed women (possibly including Herriott) at Cass Field Station, 1920

From 1921 to 1927 Professor Charles Chilton, the chair of the biology department, held the position of Rector of Canterbury College, and Herriott served as his clerical assistant.

Herriott was a member of the Philosophical Institute of Canterbury for many years; in 1919 she was elected to its council, and in the 1920s she served as its Honorary Librarian.

Herriott was a member of the Worcester Street Brethren assembly and held Evangelical Union prayer meetings in her college office.

== Death ==
On 13 March 1936, Herriott died at her home at St Andrews Square in the Christchurch suburb of Strowan.

In 2017, Herriott was selected as one of the Royal Society Te Apārangi's "150 women in 150 words", celebrating women's contributions to knowledge in New Zealand.

== Publications ==
- On the Leaf-structure of some Plants from the Southern Islands of New Zealand.
- Notes on the Occurrence and Habits of the Fresh-water Crustacean Lepidurus viridis Baird.
- A History of Hagley Park, Christchurch, with Special Reference to its Botany.
- Some Morphological Notes on the New Zealand Giant Kelp, Durvillea antarctica(Chamisso).
