= Kate Sheppard =

New Zealand suffragist (1848–1934)

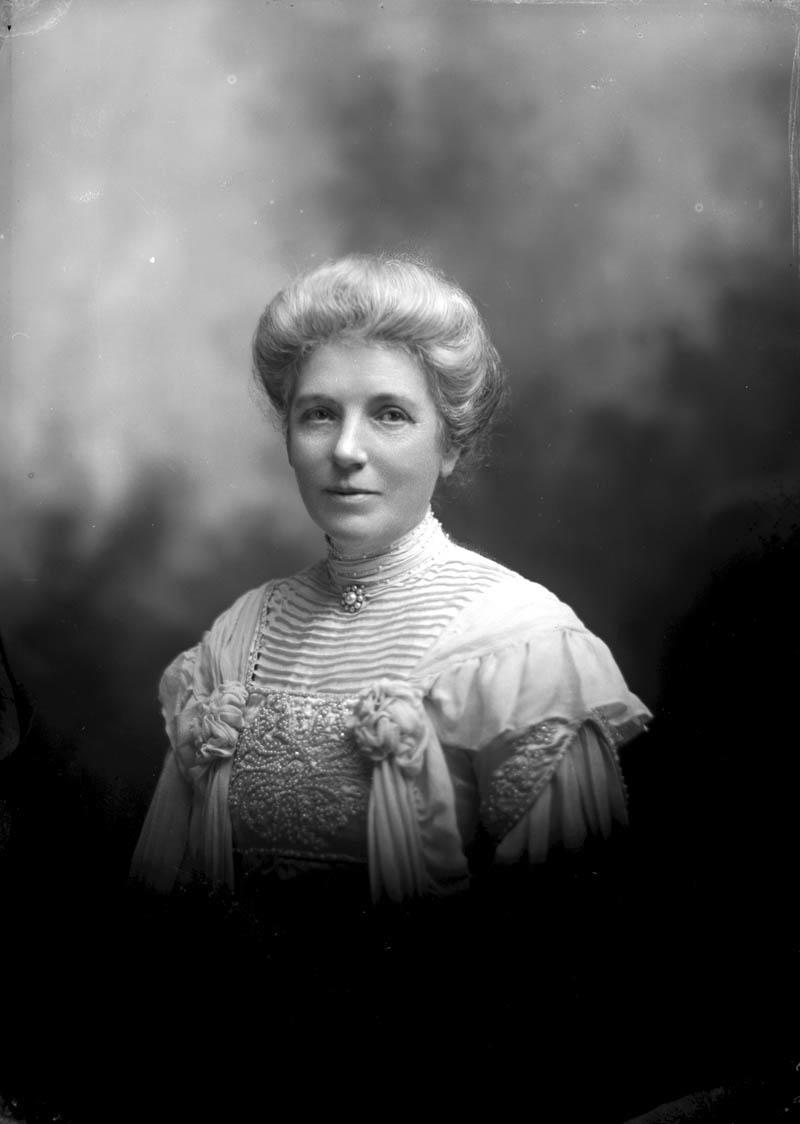
- Sheppard in 1905
- Born: Catherine Wilson Malcolm; 10 March 1848; Liverpool, England
- Died: 13 July 1934 (aged 86); Christchurch, New Zealand
- Monuments: Kate Sheppard National Memorial
- Other names: Katherine Wilson Malcolm; Kate Lovell-Smith
- Known for: Women's suffrage
- Spouses: Walter Allen Sheppard (m. 1871; died 1915); William Lovell-Smith (m. 1925)
- Children: 1
- Relatives: Isabella May (sister)

Katherine Wilson Sheppard (born Catherine Wilson Malcolm; 10 March 1848 – 13 July 1934) was a New Zealand suffragist known for organising the 1893 Women's Suffrage Petition that resulted in New Zealand becoming the first country to establish universal suffrage.

Born in Liverpool, England, she emigrated to New Zealand with her family in 1868. There she became an active member of various religious and social organisations, including the Women's Christian Temperance Union New Zealand (WCTU NZ). In 1887 she was appointed the WCTU NZ's National Superintendent for Franchise and Legislation, a position she used to advance the cause of women's suffrage in New Zealand.

Sheppard promoted women's suffrage by organising petitions and public meetings, by writing letters to the press, and by developing contacts with politicians. She was the editor of The White Ribbon, the first woman-operated newspaper in New Zealand. Through her skilful writing and persuasive public speaking, she successfully advocated women's suffrage. Her pamphlets Ten Reasons Why the Women of New Zealand Should Vote and Should Women Vote? contributed to the cause. This work culminated in a petition with 30,000 signatures calling for women's suffrage that was presented to parliament, and the successful extension of the franchise to women in 1893. As a result, New Zealand became the first country to establish universal suffrage.

Sheppard was the first president of the National Council of Women of New Zealand, founded in 1896, and helped reform the organisation in 1918. In later life, she travelled to Britain and assisted the suffrage movement there. With failing health, she returned to New Zealand, after which she continued to be involved in writing on women's rights, although she became less politically active. She died in 1934, leaving no descendants.

Sheppard is considered an important figure in New Zealand's history. A memorial to her exists in Christchurch. Her portrait replaced that of Queen Elizabeth II on the front of the New Zealand ten-dollar note in 1991.

== Early life ==
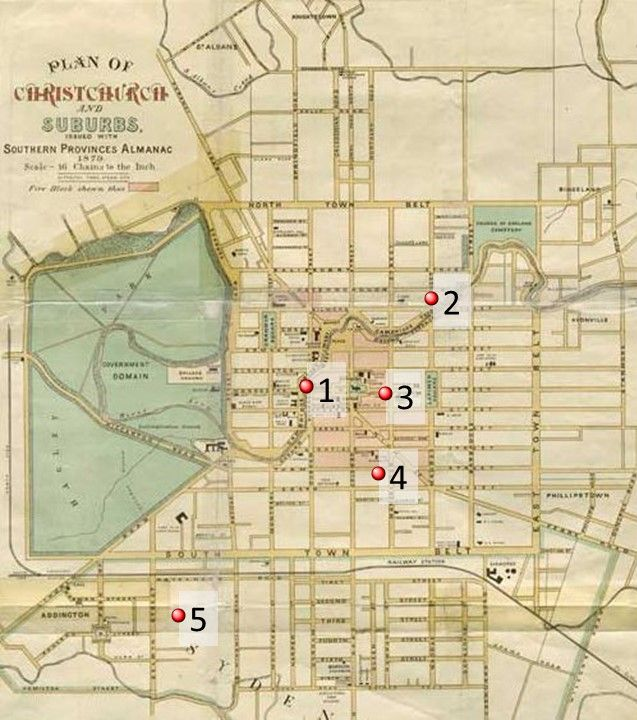
Notable Sheppard locations: 1) Kate Sheppard National Memorial 2) Madras St residence 3) Trinity Church 4) Tuam St Hall 5) Addington Cemetery

Kate Sheppard was born Catherine Wilson Malcolm on 10 March 1848 (Note: Malcolm in The Dictionary of New Zealand Biography (1993) said she was born "probably on 10 March 1847", and some later works have repeated that date, usually omitting the "probably". However, Devaliant 1992, p. 5, says that Kate gave her birth year as 1848 and that her birthday was 10 March. Furthermore, newspaper notices following her death on 13 July 1934, and her gravestone, record her age at death as 86, which indicates 1848 as her birth year.) in Liverpool, England, to Scottish parents Jemima Crawford Souter and Andrew Wilson Malcolm. Her father, born in Scotland in 1819, was described in various documents as either a lawyer, banker, brewer's clerk, or legal clerk; he married Souter in the Inner Hebrides on 14 July 1842. Catherine was named after her paternal grandmother, also Catherine Wilson Malcolm, but preferred to spell her name "Katherine" or to abbreviate it to "Kate". She had an elder sister Marie, born in Scotland, and three younger siblings – Frank, born in Birmingham, and Isabella and Robert, both born in London; evidently, the family moved often during that period. Details of the children's education are unknown, though Kate's later writings demonstrate extensive knowledge of science and law, indicating a strong education. She was known for her broad knowledge and intellectual ability. Her father loved music and ensured that the family had good musical training.

Kate's father died in 1862, in his early forties, but left his widow with sufficient means to provide for the family. After her father's death, Kate lived with her uncle, a minister of the Free Church of Scotland at Nairn; he, more than anyone else, instilled in her the values of Christian socialism. During this time, the rest of the family stayed with relatives in Dublin, where Kate later joined them.

George Beath, the future husband of Kate's sister Marie, emigrated to Melbourne in 1863 and later moved to Christchurch. After Marie joined him there, they were married in 1867 and their first child was born the following year. Marie's accounts of Christchurch motivated Jemima to move her family to New Zealand, as she was seeking better prospects for her sons' employment and wanted to see her granddaughter. They sailed on the Matoaka from Gravesend on 12 November 1868, arriving in Lyttelton Harbour on 8 February 1869.

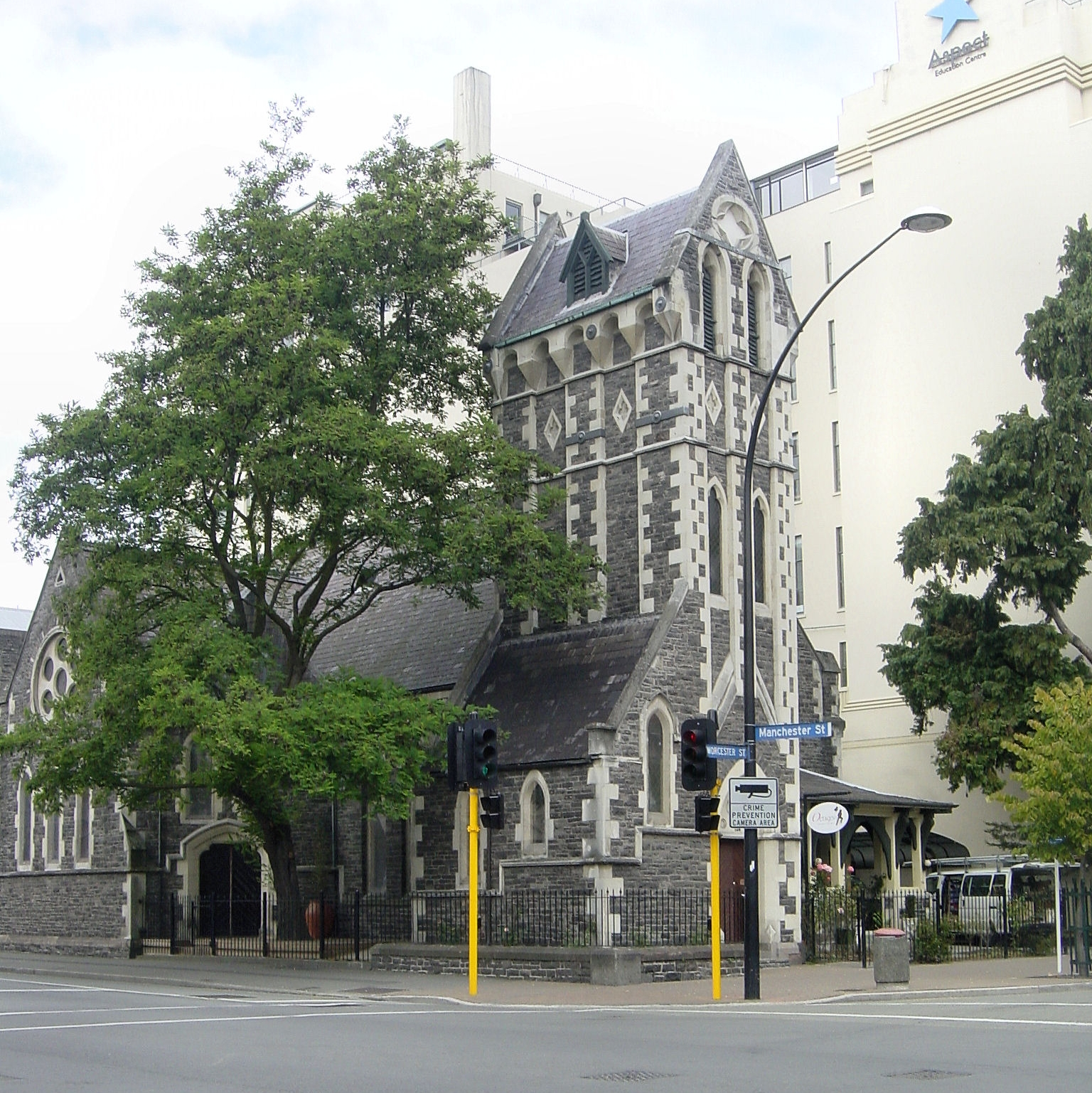
Trinity Congregational Church, where Sheppard worshipped

In Christchurch, most of the family, including Kate, joined the Trinity Congregational Church. The minister was William Habens, a graduate of the University of London who was also Classics Master at Christchurch High School. (Note: Christchurch High School, originally Christchurch Academy, later became Christchurch West High School and is now Hagley College.) Kate became part of Christchurch's intellectual and social scenes, and spent time with Marie and George's growing family.

Kate married Walter Allen Sheppard, a shop owner, at her mother's house on 21 July 1871. Walter had been elected to the Christchurch City Council in 1868, and may have impressed Kate with his knowledge of local matters. They lived on Madras Street, not far from her mother's home, and within walking distance of the city centre. The Trinity Congregational Church raised funds for a new building from 1872 to 1874, and Kate was most likely involved in this. She formed a friendship with Alfred Saunders, a politician and prominent temperance activist who may have influenced her ideas on women's suffrage. Sheppard and her husband arrived in England in 1877 and spent a year there, then returned to Christchurch. Their only child, Douglas, was born on 8 December 1880.

Sheppard was an active member of various Christian organisations. She taught Sunday school, and in 1884 was elected secretary of the newly formed Trinity Ladies' Association, a body established to visit parishioners who did not regularly attend church services. The association also helped with fundraising and did jobs for the church such as providing morning tea. Sheppard wrote reports on the work of the association, tried to recruit new members, and worked to retain existing ones. The following year she joined the Riccarton Choral Society. Her solo in a May 1886 concert was praised in the Lyttelton Times. She also served on the management committee of the YWCA.

== Women's suffrage movement ==
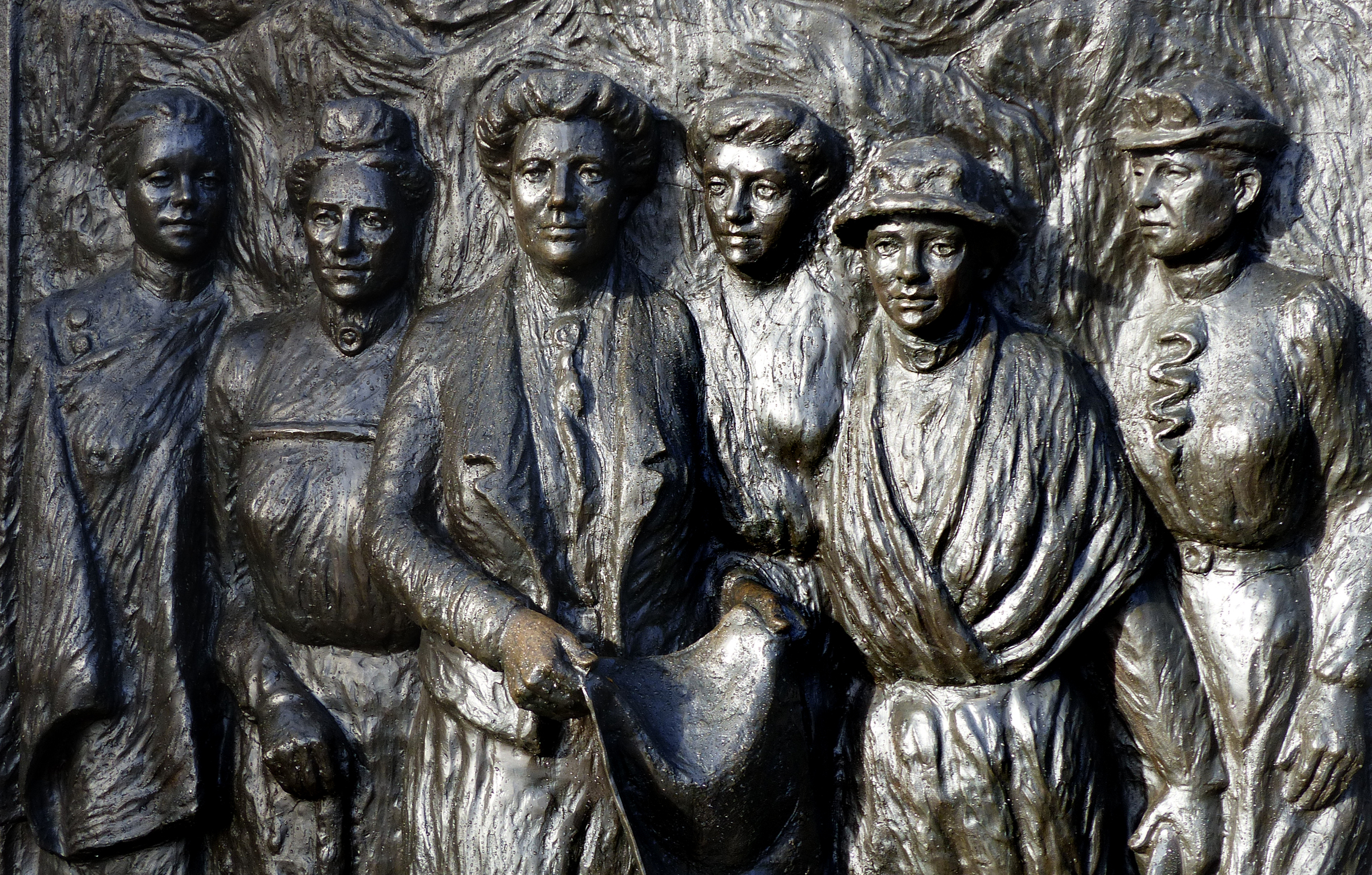
Sheppard and five other prominent New Zealand suffragists are commemorated on the Kate Sheppard National Memorial, a bronze sculpture in Christchurch.

=== Early engagement ===
Kate Sheppard's activism and engagement with politics began after listening to or reading about a talk by Mary Leavitt from the Woman's Christian Temperance Union (WCTU) of the United States. In 1885 Leavitt toured New Zealand speaking not only about the problems caused by alcohol consumption, but also the need for women to have a "voice in public affairs". She spent two weeks in Christchurch, starting with a public speech at the Theatre Royal on 10 May. Journalists were impressed by the strength of public speaking displayed by a woman, something not witnessed often at that time in New Zealand.

Sheppard became involved in establishing a Christchurch branch of the WCTU NZ prior to the formation of a national organisation. Her initial involvement was in promoting petitions to Parliament to prevent women being employed as barmaids, and to outlaw the sale of alcohol to children. This marked the beginning of her collaborations with Alfred Saunders, who advised her on her negotiations with politicians and who wrote to the premier, Sir Robert Stout, seeking to further her campaign. The barmaid petitions (including some from other parts of the country) were rejected by the Petitions Committee of Parliament later in 1885. Sheppard decided that politicians would continue to ignore petitions from women as long as women could not vote.

In 1879 universal male suffrage had been granted to all men over the age of 21 whether they owned property or not, but women were still excluded as electors. (Note: All Māori men had been able to elect members of Māori electorates since 1867.) A limited number of voting rights were extended to female voters in the 1870s. Female ratepayers were able to vote in local body elections in 1873 and in 1877 women "householders" were given the right to vote in and stand for education boards. (Note: "Rates" are a tax on land levied by local councils.)

The New Zealand Women's Christian Temperance Union was formed under the leadership of Anne Ward at a conference in Wellington in February 1886. Sheppard did not attend that conference, but at the second national convention in Christchurch a year later, she arrived ready to present a paper on women's suffrage, although there was no opportunity for her to do so. She was first appointed Superintendent for Relative Statistics, owing to her interest in economics. In 1887—when more local Franchise departments were established within the WCTU NZ—she replaced Mrs. G Clarke as National Superintendent for the Franchise and Legislation.

Much of the support for moderation came from women, and the WCTU NZ believed that women's suffrage could advance their aim to prohibit alcohol while promoting child and family welfare. Sheppard soon became prominent in the area of women's suffrage, but her interest in the cause went beyond practical considerations regarding temperance. Her views were made well known with her statement that "all that separates, whether of race, class, creed, or sex, is inhuman, and must be overcome." Sheppard proved to be a powerful speaker and a skilled organiser, quickly building support for her cause.

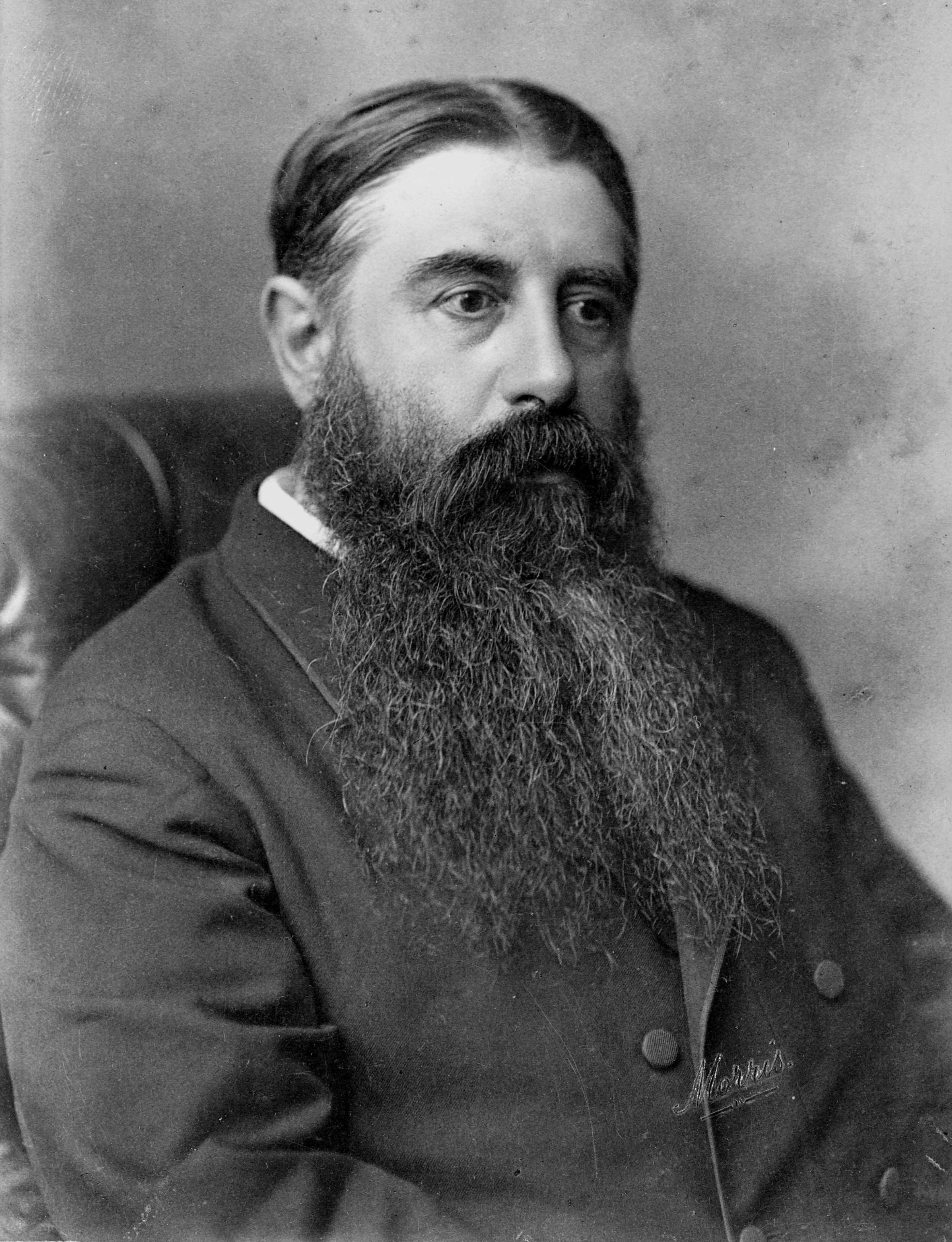
Sir Julius Vogel, member of parliament for Christchurch North and former premier, introduced a Female Suffrage Bill to Parliament in 1887.

The WCTU NZ sent a deputation to Sir Julius Vogel, a member of parliament and former premier, asking him to introduce a suffrage bill to parliament. He did so in 1887, with the Female Suffrage Bill, and Sheppard campaigned for its support. In its third reading, the part dealing with women's suffrage was defeated by one vote, and the bill was withdrawn. During the general election campaign later that year Sheppard encouraged WCTU NZ members to ask parliamentary candidates questions about suffrage, but few women did so.

In 1888 Sheppard was President of the Christchurch branch of the WCTU NZ, and presented a report to the national convention in Dunedin, where the convention decided that prohibition and women's suffrage would be the organisation's central aims. Sheppard made public speeches on suffrage in Dunedin, Oamaru, and Christchurch, developing a confident speaking style. To reinforce her message, she gave audiences leaflets produced in Britain and the United States. Sheppard then published her own single-sheet pamphlet titled Ten Reasons Why the Women of New Zealand Should Vote, which displayed her "dry wit and logical approach". A copy was sent to every member of the House of Representatives.

=== Petitions ===
The government introduced an Electoral Bill in 1888 that would continue to exclude women from suffrage, and Sheppard organised a petition requesting that the exclusion be removed. She wrote to, and later met with, Sir John Hall, a well-respected Canterbury member of the House of Representatives, inviting him to present the petition and support her cause. He did so, but no action resulted. Sheppard then produced a second pamphlet, Should Women Vote?, which presented statements on suffrage from notable people in New Zealand and overseas. The Electoral Bill was delayed until 1890, when on 5 August, Hall proposed a motion "That in the opinion of the House, the right of voting for members of the House of Representatives should be extended to women." After vigorous debate, this was passed 37 votes to 11. On 21 August, Hall moved an amendment to the Electoral Bill to give women suffrage, but it was defeated by seven votes.

Following the defeat, Hall suggested to Sheppard that a petition to parliament should be the next step. She drew up the wording for the petition, arranged for the forms to be printed, and campaigned hard for its support. During the 1890 election campaign, WCTU members attempted to ask all candidates about their position on women's suffrage. The petition contained 10,085 signatures (according to WCTU minutes), and Hall presented it to Parliament in 1891 as a new Electoral Bill went into committee. The petition was supported in Parliament by Hall, Alfred Saunders, and the premier at the time, John Ballance. Hall moved an amendment to the Electoral Bill to give women suffrage; it passed with a majority of 25 votes. An opponent of suffrage, Walter Carncross, then moved an amendment which would also allow women to stand for parliament; this seemed a logical extension of Hall's amendment but was actually calculated to cause the bill's failure in New Zealand's upper house, the New Zealand Legislative Council. The bill indeed failed in the Upper House by two votes.

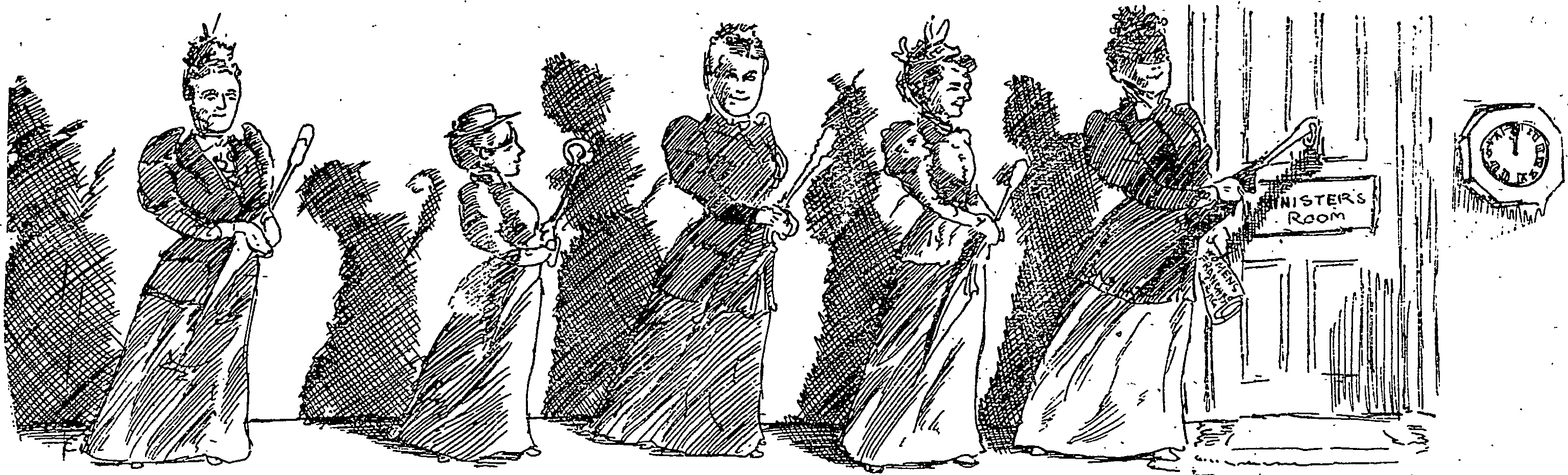
Illustrated comic of the Auckland Franchise League lining up outside the Premier's office. Published in The Observer in 1893.

In 1890 Sheppard was one of the founders of the Christian Ethical Society, a discussion group for both men and women, not limited to the members of a single church. In their first few meetings the topics included selfishness, conjugal relations, and dress reform. The society gave Sheppard more confidence debating her ideas with people from diverse backgrounds. During 1891 Sheppard began editing a page in the Prohibitionist on behalf of the WCTU. The Prohibitionist was a fortnightly temperance paper with a circulation around New Zealand of over 20,000. Sheppard used the pseudonym "Penelope" in this paper.

Sheppard promised that a second petition would be twice as large and worked through the summer to organise it; it received 20,274 women's signatures. Using paid canvassers, the Liberal MP Henry Fish organised two counter petitions, one signed by men and the other by women; they received 5,000 signatures between them. An Electoral Bill in 1892 included provision for women's suffrage and again it easily passed in the House of Representatives, but the Upper House requested that women's votes be postal rather than by ballot. As the two houses could not agree on this, the bill failed.

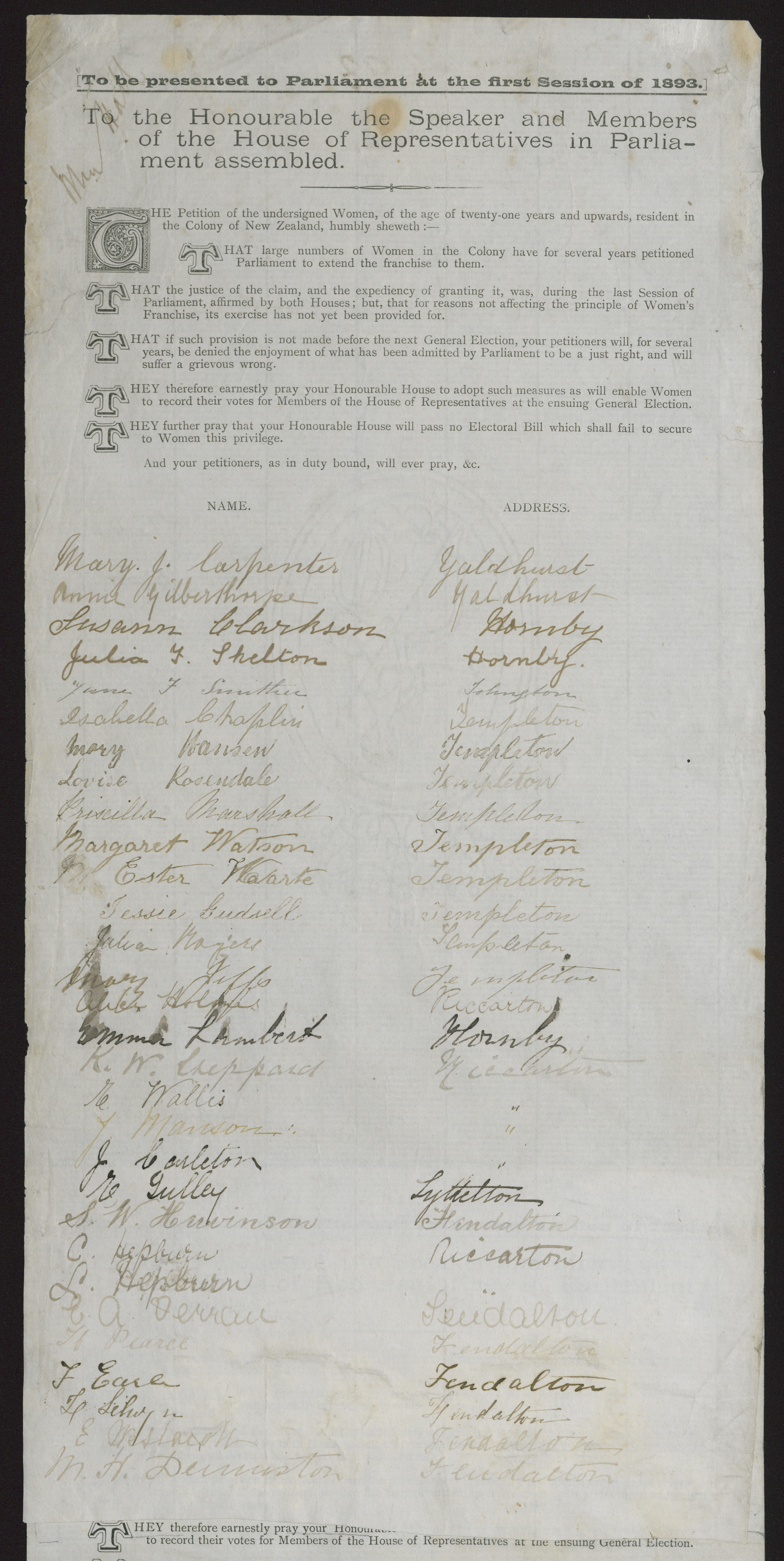
The first page of the successful 1893 Women's Suffrage Petition

A third petition for suffrage, still larger, was organised by Sheppard and presented in 1893. This time 31,872 women signed—the largest petition of any kind presented to Parliament at this point.

=== 1893 Electoral Bill ===
The Electoral Bill of 1893, which granted women full voting rights, successfully passed in the House of Representatives in August. Few MPs were willing to vote against it, fearing that women would vote against them in the general election later that year. Many therefore chose to be absent from the house during votes. Henry Fish attempted to delay the proposed statute by calling for a national referendum, but the bill progressed to the Legislative Council. After several attempts to stymie passage failed, the legislation passed 20 votes to 18 on 8 September. The bill now needed the governor's signature, and although Governor David Boyle did not support women's suffrage and was slow to sign, he eventually did so on 19 September. Sheppard was widely acknowledged as the leader of the women's suffrage movement.

== 1893 general election and further women's advocacy ==
Sheppard had no time to rest, as the 1893 election was only ten weeks away, and the newspapers were spreading rumours that an early election might be called to reduce the number of women enrolled. Along with the WCTU NZ, she was highly active in encouraging women to register as voters. The main meeting venue in Christchurch was the Tuam Street Hall. One of her largest detractors was the liquor industry, which feared for its continued business. Despite the short notice, 88 percent of women had enrolled to vote by election date (28 November), and nearly 70 percent ended up casting a vote. Although women had gained the vote they were not eligible to stand in parliamentary elections until 1919, and it was not until 1933 that the first woman was elected to parliament.

In around 1892 Sheppard had started bicycling around Christchurch—one of the first women in the city to do so. She joined the Atalanta Ladies' Cycling Club, which existed from 1892 to 1897, and was a founding committee member. The club was the first women's cycling club in New Zealand or Australia and attracted controversy as some of its members advocated "rational dress"—such as knickerbockers rather than skirts for female cyclists.

In December 1893 Sheppard was elected President of the Christchurch branch of the WCTU NZ. She chaired the first two meetings in 1894 before travelling to England with her husband and son. She was in great demand in England as a speaker to women's groups about the struggle for women's suffrage in New Zealand. In mid-1895 the WCTU launched a monthly journal, The White Ribbon, with Sheppard as the editor, contributing to it from overseas. While in England Sheppard experienced health problems, requiring an operation, possibly a hysterectomy. The family returned to New Zealand at the beginning of 1896. Later that year, Sheppard was reappointed editor of The White Ribbon.

== Canterbury Women's Institute and the National Council of Women ==
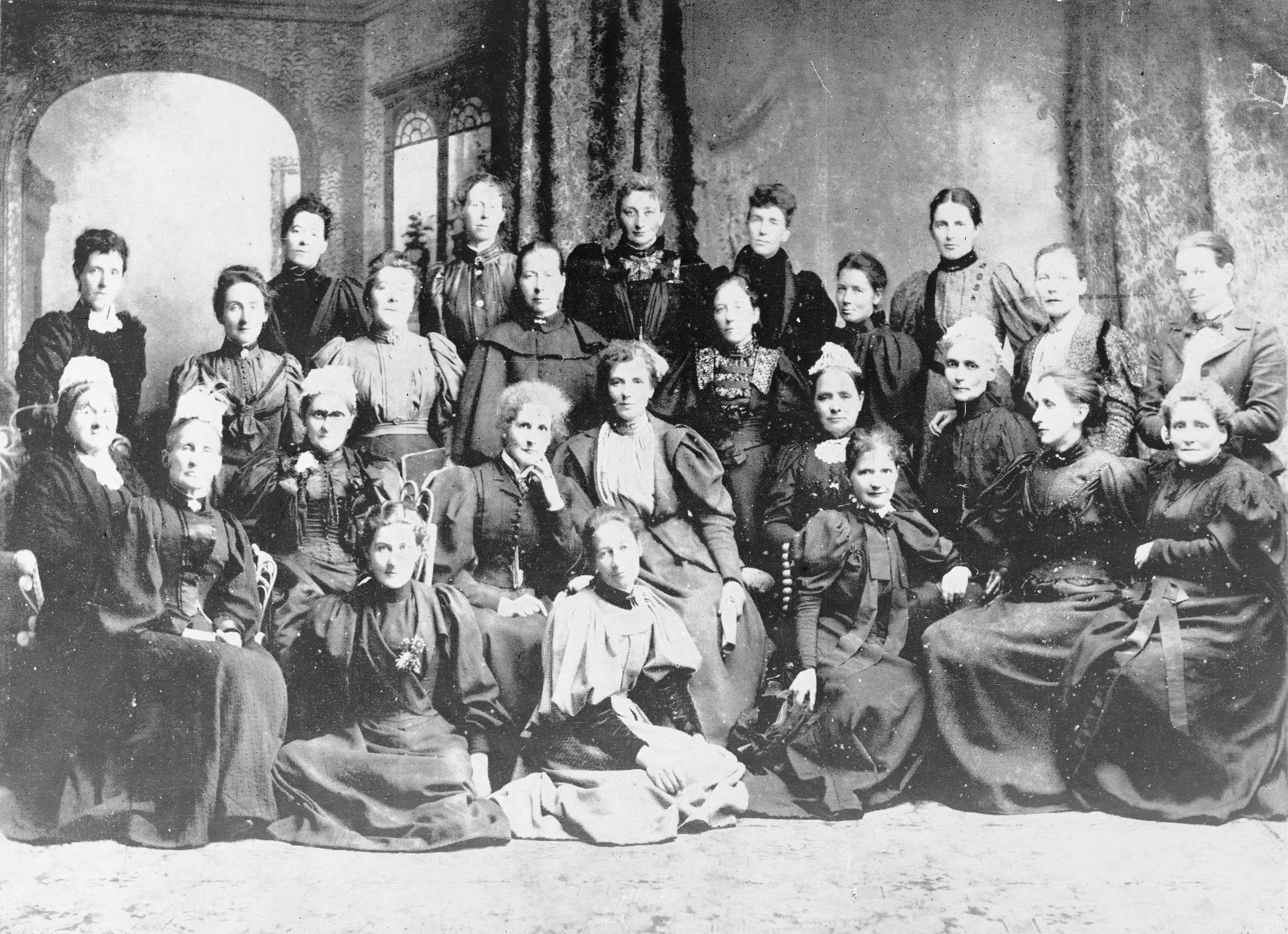
National Council of Women, Christchurch, 1896

The Canterbury Women's Institute was formed in September 1892 with Sheppard playing a leading role and taking charge of the economics department. The institute was open to both men and women and worked to reduce inequalities between them. Sheppard believed that enfranchisement was the first step towards achieving other reforms, such as reforming unfair laws on marriage, parenthood, and property, and towards eliminating the uneven treatment of the sexes in morality.

The National Council of Women of New Zealand was established in April 1896 by the Canterbury Women's Institute and ten other women's groups from throughout New Zealand, and Sheppard was elected president at its founding convention. The council promoted the right of women to stand for Parliament, equal pay and equal opportunities for women, the removal of legal disabilities affecting women, and economic independence for married women.

Sheppard's election as president, instead of fellow feminist Lady Anna Stout, had caused a rift. This, along with other disagreements such as whether the council should support New Zealand's involvement in the Second Boer War, contributed to the organisation going into recess in 1906.

== Later life ==
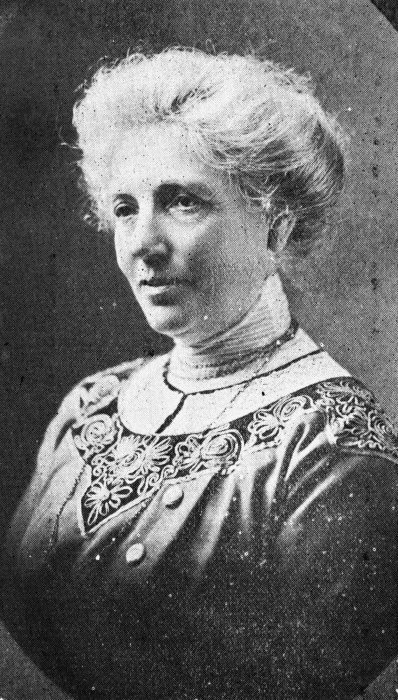
Kate Sheppard, c. 1914

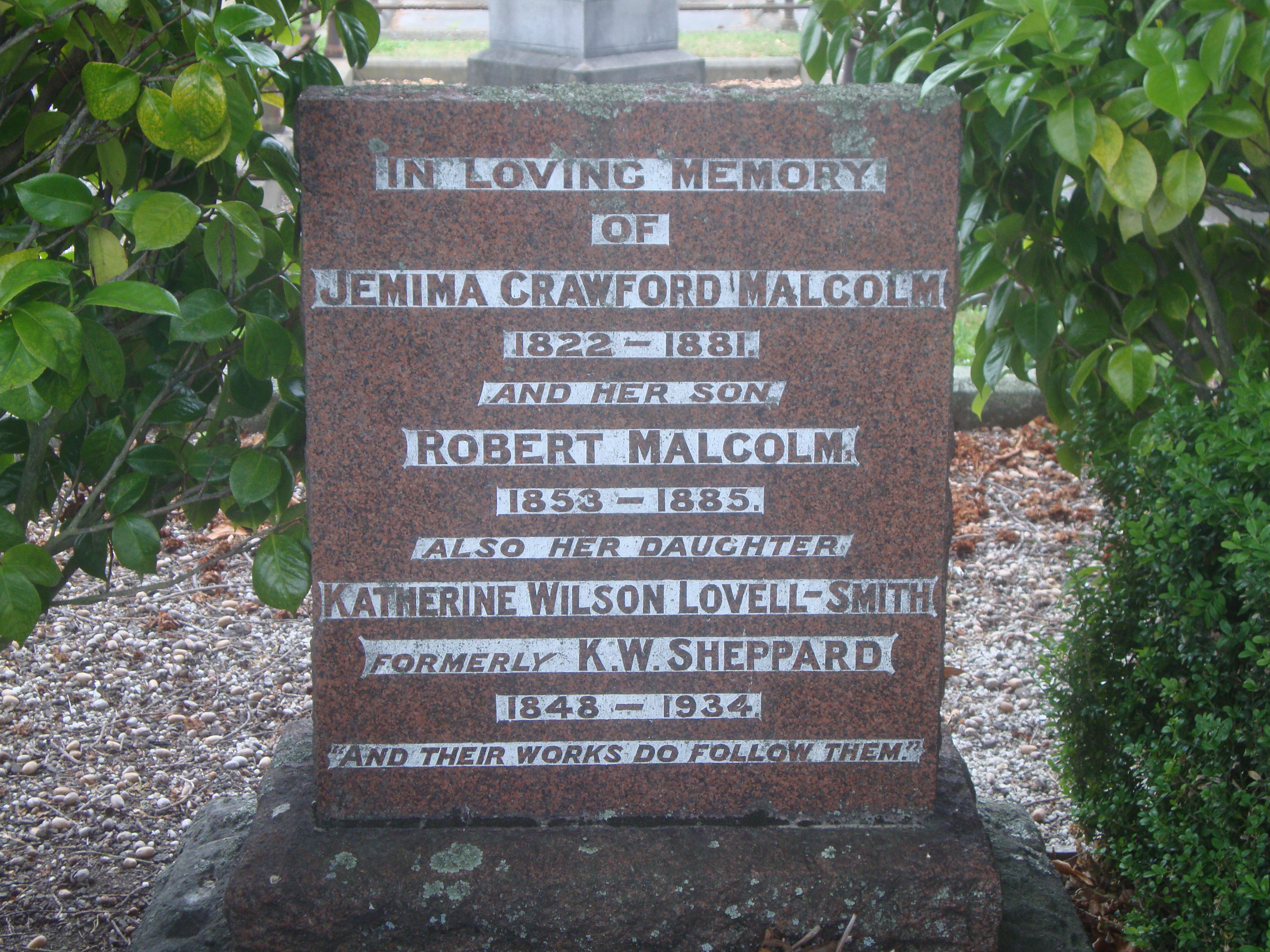
Sheppard's grave at Addington Cemetery, Christchurch

As editor of The White Ribbon and president of the National Council of Women, Sheppard promoted many ideas related to improving the situation and status of women. In particular, she was concerned about establishing legal and economic independence of women from men. She was not only occupied with advancing women's rights, but also promoted political reforms such as proportional representation, binding referendums, and a Cabinet elected directly by Parliament.

By 1902 Sheppard's marriage appears to have been under strain, and possibly had been for several years. Her husband sold their house and moved to England with their son, who wished to study in London. Sheppard bought new furnishings and appeared to be planning for a new permanent residence in Christchurch, but sold them in 1903, stepped down from her positions at the National Council of Women, and moved to England without any fixed date to return. On the way she briefly stopped in Canada and the United States where she met the American suffragist Carrie Chapman Catt. In London, she was active in promoting women's suffrage, but her health deteriorated further, forcing her to stop this work.

In November 1904 Sheppard returned to New Zealand with her husband, but he went back to England in March the following year. She moved into the house of her long-time friends William Sidney Lovell-Smith and his wife Jennie Lovell-Smith; their third daughter, Hilda Kate Lovell-Smith, had been given her middle name after Sheppard. She remained relatively inactive in political circles, and stopped giving speeches, but continued to write. She prepared a display on the history of women's suffrage for the 1906 Exhibition in Christchurch, and wrote the pamphlet Woman Suffrage in New Zealand for the International Women's Suffrage Alliance in 1907. The following year she travelled to England for her son's wedding, visiting the headquarters of the WCTU in Chicago on the way, and meeting with suffrage groups after arriving in Britain. In 1912 and 1913, she travelled with the Lovell-Smiths through India and Europe. While she did not recover her former energy, her health had stopped declining, and she continued to be effective in influencing the New Zealand women's movement. She was the first to sign a petition to the prime minister, Sir Joseph Ward, in 1916, asking him to urge the British government to enfranchise women, and she revitalised the National Council of Women along with a group of other prominent suffragists in 1918. Sheppard was elected president of the National Council that year before stepping down in 1919.

Sheppard's husband Walter died in England in 1915. Jennie Lovell-Smith died in 1924 and Sheppard and William Lovell-Smith married in 1925. Lovell-Smith died only four years later, and Sheppard herself died in Christchurch on 13 July 1934 at the age of 86. As her son Douglas had died of pernicious anaemia at the age of 29 in 1910, and her only grandchild, Margaret Isabel Sheppard, had died of tuberculosis at the age of 19 in 1930, Sheppard left no living direct descendants. She was buried at Addington Cemetery, Christchurch, in a grave with her mother and her brother Robert.

== Commemoration ==
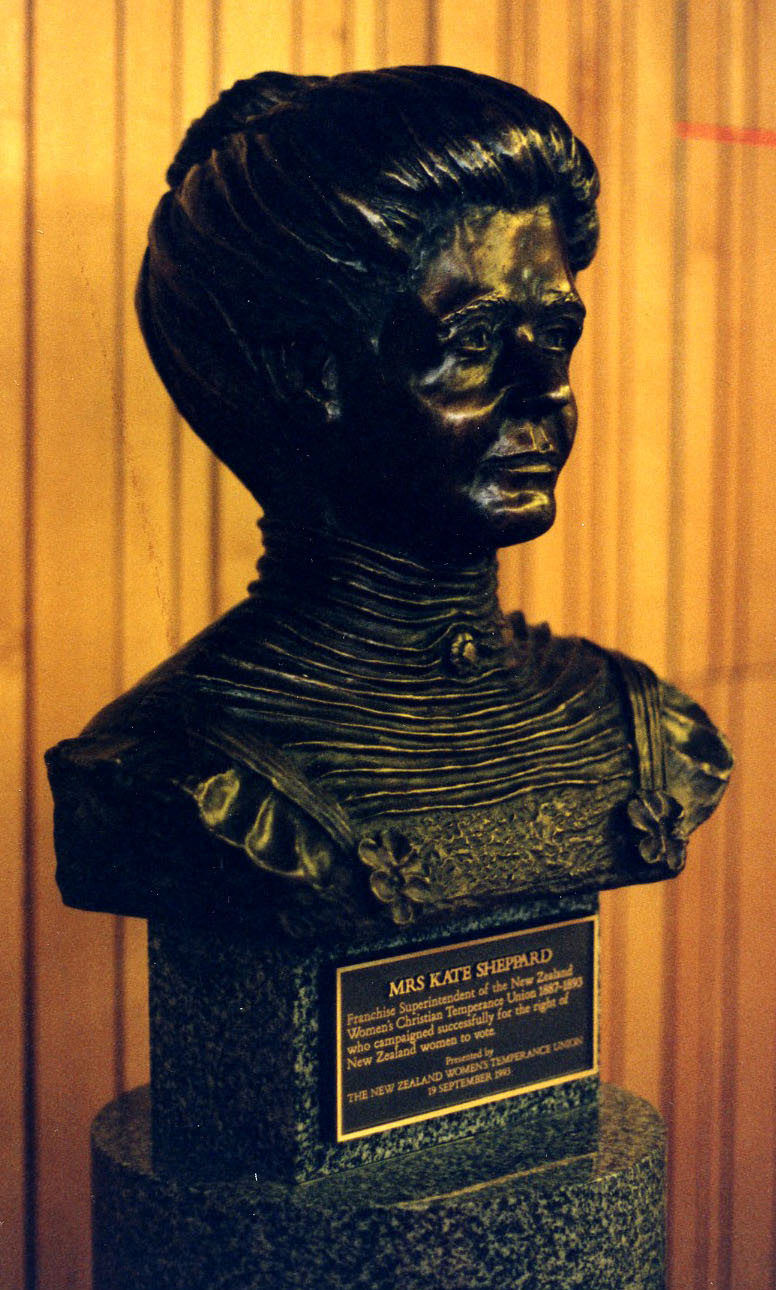
Bust of Kate Sheppard presented to Parliament in 1973 by the WCTU

Sheppard is considered an important figure in New Zealand's history. Since 1991 her profile has featured on the New Zealand ten-dollar note. A 2005 television show New Zealand's Top 100 History Makers ranked Sheppard as the second most influential New Zealander of all time. Similarly, The New Zealand Herald selected Sheppard as one of their ten greatest New Zealanders in 2013.

In 1972 Patricia Grimshaw's book Women's Suffrage in New Zealand identified Sheppard as the leading figure of the suffrage movement. This was the first acclaimed book to do so and its publication marked a growth in recognition of Kate Sheppard's life and activism.

In 1993 the centenary of women's suffrage in New Zealand, a group of Christchurch women established two memorials to Sheppard: the Kate Sheppard National Memorial, on the banks of the Avon River / Ōtākaro, and the Kate Sheppard Memorial Trust Award, an annual award to women in research. That year a special paeony-style white camellia was created at Camellia Glen Nurseries in Kaupokonui, Taranaki; white camellias were a symbol of the suffragists. It was named after Kate Sheppard and planted extensively throughout New Zealand.

The Fendalton house at 83 Clyde Road, where the Sheppards lived from 1888 to 1902 and now known as the Kate Sheppard House, is registered by Heritage New Zealand as a Category I heritage building, in view of the many events relevant to women's suffrage that happened there. It was here that Sheppard pasted together the three main petitions onto sheets of wallpaper. Kate Sheppard House came into government ownership in 2019.

New Zealand playwright Mervyn Thompson wrote the play O! Temperance! about Sheppard and the temperance movement. It was first performed in 1972 at Christchurch's Court Theatre. In 2016 and 2017 the production That Bloody Woman, which re-imagined Kate Sheppard's life as a punk rock musical, toured New Zealand.

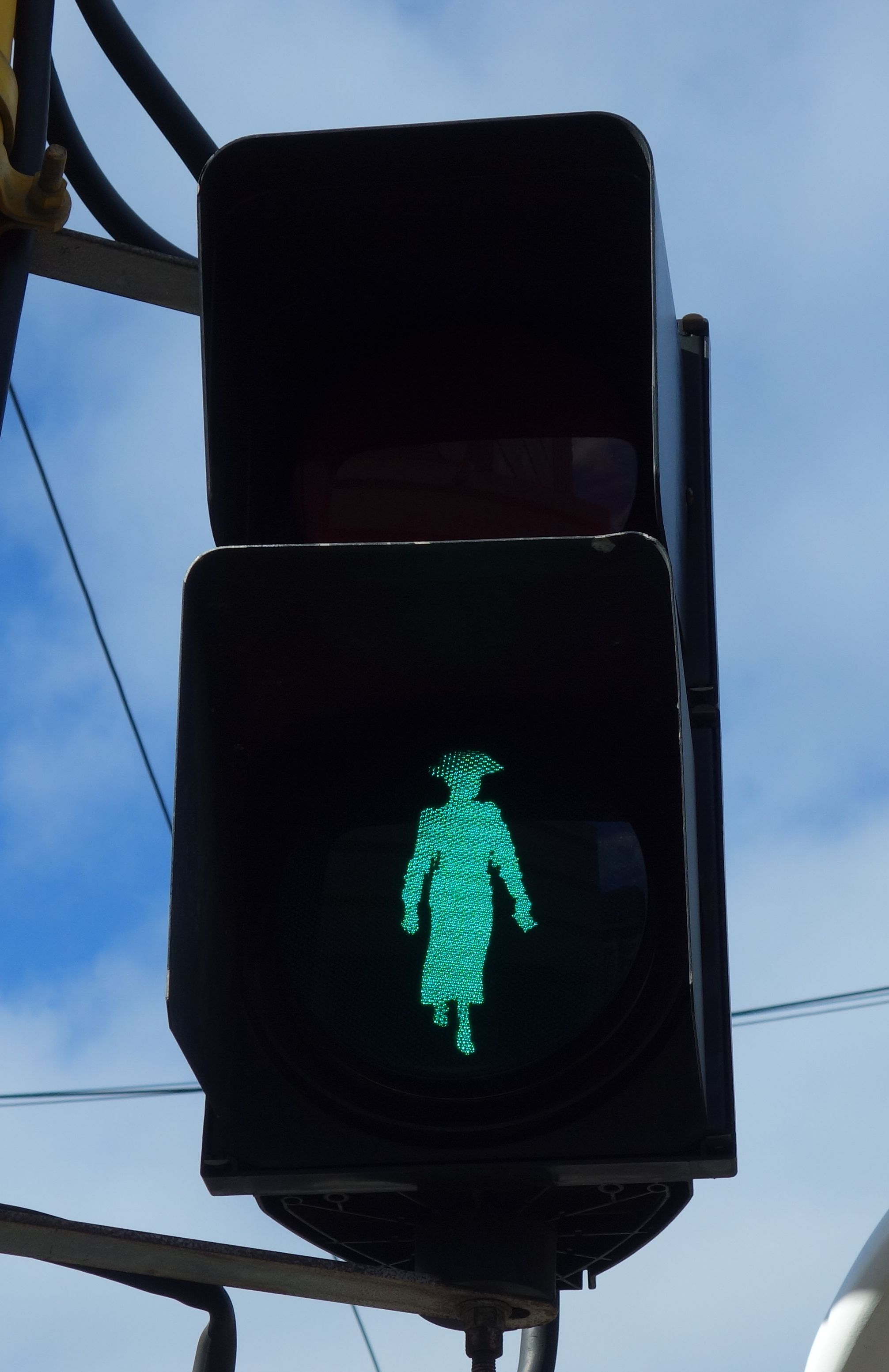
Sheppard on a pedestrian signal outside the Parliament Buildings in Wellington

Kate Sheppard Place, located within Wellington's parliament precinct, was named in her honour in the 1990s; it is a short one-way street running from Molesworth Street opposite Parliament House to Mulgrave Street. In 2014 eight intersections near Parliament in Wellington were fitted with green pedestrian lights depicting Kate Sheppard.

Several New Zealand schools have houses named after Sheppard. (Note: A number of schools in the Canterbury region alone have houses named in her honour: for example a Sheppard House exists at Cashmere High School, Christchurch Girls' High School, Christchurch South Intermediate and Rangiora High School.) In 2014 Whangārei Girls' High School renamed a house that was named after Richard Seddon, an opponent of women's suffrage, to Sheppard House at the request of a student.

On 8 March 2018 coinciding with International Women's Day and in celebration of the 125th anniversary of the women's suffrage movement, New Zealand Football renamed its premier women's knockout association football tournament the Kate Sheppard Cup.

== Works ==
- Sheppard, Kate (17 May 2017) [1888]. "Ten Reasons Why the Women of New Zealand Should Vote". New Zealand History. New Zealand Ministry for Culture and Heritage.
- Shappard, Kate (1890). Should women vote?. (Pamphlet)
- Sheppard, Kate (n.d.) [1924]. "How we won the franchise in New Zealand". New Zealand History. New Zealand Women's Christian Temperance Union. p. 7.
- Sheppard, Kate (1907). Woman Suffrage in New Zealand. International Woman Suffrage Alliance.
- "1893 women's suffrage petition". New Zealand History. Wellington, New Zealand: New Zealand Ministry for Culture and Heritage. n.d. [28 July 1893].

== See also ==
- List of suffragists and suffragettes
- National Council of Women of New Zealand
- Timeline of women's suffrage
- Women's Christian Temperance Union New Zealand
- Gender equality in New Zealand

== Sources ==
Books and journals

- Adas, Michael (2010). Essays on Twentieth-Century History. Philadelphia, Pennsylvania: Temple University Press. ISBN 9781439902714.
- Amodeo, Colin (2006). West! 1858–1966 : a social history of Christchurch West High School and its predecessors. Christchurch: Westonians Association in conjunction with the Caxton Press. ISBN 9780473116347.
- Dalziel, Raewyn (1973). "Reviews: Women's Suffrage in New Zealand" (PDF). New Zealand Journal of History. 7: 201–202. Archived from the original (PDF) on 5 February 2020.
- Devaliant, Judith (1992). Kate Sheppard: The Fight for Women's Votes in New Zealand. Auckland: Penguin Books. ISBN 9780140176148.
- Fleischer, Jeff (2014). Rockin' the Boat: 50 Iconic Revolutionaries from Joan of Arc to Malcolm X. San Francisco, California: Zest Books. pp. 151–154. ISBN 9781936976744.
- Grimshaw, Patricia (1987). Women's Suffrage in New Zealand. Auckland: Auckland University Press. ISBN 9781869400262.
- King, Michael (2003). The Penguin History of New Zealand. Auckland: Penguin Books. ISBN 9780143018674.
- Lusted, Marcia Amidon (March 2009). "International Suffrage". Cobblestone. 30 (3): 40. ISSN 0199-5197.
- Malcolm, Tessa K. (1993). "Sheppard, Katherine Wilson". The Dictionary of New Zealand biography. Vol. Two, 1870–1900. Wellington: Bridget Williams Books : Dept. of Internal Affairs. pp. 459–462. ISBN 0908912498.
- Pierce, Jill (1995). The Suffrage Trail. Wellington: National Council of Women New Zealand (NCWNZ). ISBN 0-473-03150-7.
- Simpson, Clare (1993). "Atalanta Cycling Club". In Else, Anne (ed.). Women Together : A History of Women's Organisations in New Zealand : Ngā Ropū Wāhine o te Motu. Wellington: Wellington Historical Branch, Department of Internal Affairs. pp. 418–419.
- Sulkunen, Irma (2015). "An International Comparison of Women's Suffrage: The Cases of Finland and New Zealand in the Late Nineteenth and Early Twentieth Century". Journal of Women's History. 27 (4): 88–107. doi:10.1353/jowh.2015.0040. S2CID 147589131.
- Thompson, Mervyn (1974). O! Temperance!. Christchurch: Christchurch Theatre Trust.

News

- Choe, Kim (12 June 2016). "Review: Auckland Theatre Company's That Bloody Woman". Newshub. Mediaworks. Archived from the original on 3 February 2018.
- "Christian Ethical Society". The Press. 14 June 1890. p. 6.
- "Deaths: Lovell-Smith". The Press. 14 July 1934. p. 1. "On Friday, July 13th, at "Midway," Riccarton road, Katherine Wilson Lovell-Smith; in her 87th year."
- "Editorial". The Lyttelton Times. 23 August 1890. p. 4.
- "Editorial". The Press. 16 May 1885. p. 2.
- "Gospel Temperance Union". The Lyttelton Times. 11 May 1885. p. 5.
- "Gospel Temperance Union – Mrs Leavitt at Durham Street Wesleyan Church". The Lyttelton Times. 16 May 1885. p. 5.
- "A history of NZ money". Newshub. 4 November 2016. Archived from the original on 30 March 2017.
- Hyslop, Liam (8 March 2018). "NZ Football rename Women's Knockout Cup after Kate Sheppard". Stuff.co.nz.
- MacAndrew, Ruby (14 September 2017). "Theatre review: That Bloody Woman". stuff.co.nz. Stuff.
- Maoate-Cox, Daniela (11 September 2014). "Kate Sheppard lights encourage voting". radionz.co.nz. Radio New Zealand.
- "Meetings of Societies". The Lyttelton Times. 23 July 1885. p. 6.
- "Obituary: Mrs. Lovell-Smith". Evening Post. 20 July 1934. p. 12. "... the death of Mrs. Kate Wilson Lovell-Smith, which occurred in Christchurch on Friday, at the age of 86 years. ...."
- "Our greatest New Zealanders". The New Zealand Herald. NZME. 13 November 2013.
- "Riccarton Choral Society". The Lyttelton Times. 26 May 1886. p. 3.
- Ryan, Sophie (11 February 2014). "Feminist student making a name for equality". Northern Advocate. NZME.
- "Shipping". The Lyttelton Times. 9 February 1869. p. 2.
- "The Women's Franchise". The Auckland Star. 20 May 1887. p. 4.
- "Enrolment Meeting". The Star. No. 4758. 26 September 1893. p. 3.
- "Government steps in to buy Kate Sheppard's house for $4.5m". Radio New Zealand. 19 September 2019.

Theses

- Turbott, Garth John (2013). Anthroposophy in the Antipodes: A Lived Spirituality in New Zealand 1902–1960s (PDF) (M.A.). Massey University. p. 102.

Web

- "The Atalanta Ladies' Cycling Club". Christchurch City Libraries.
- Brewerton, Emma (8 November 2017). "Kate Sheppard". New Zealand Ministry for Culture and Heritage.
- Cook, Megan. "Women's movement—Women's groups, 1890s'". Te Ara – the Encyclopedia of New Zealand.
- "The History of Bank Notes in New Zealand". The Reserve Bank of New Zealand.
- "House Competitions". Cashmere High School.
- "Houses" (PDF). Christchurch Girls' High School. Archived from the original (PDF) on 31 January 2019.
- "Houses". Rangiora High School.
- "Kate Sheppard, 1847–1934". Christchurch City Libraries.
- "Kate Sheppard House". New Zealand History. New Zealand Ministry for Culture and Heritage.
- Lovell-Smith, Margaret (2000). "Lovell-Smith, Hilda Kate". Dictionary of New Zealand Biography. Te Ara – the Encyclopedia of New Zealand.
- Malcolm, Tessa K. (May 2013) [1993]. "Sheppard, Katherine Wilson". Dictionary of New Zealand Biography. Te Ara – the Encyclopedia of New Zealand.
- McGibbon, Ian (1990). "Saunders, Alfred". Dictionary of New Zealand Biography. Te Ara – the Encyclopedia of New Zealand.
- McKenzie, David (1993). "William James Habens". Dictionary of New Zealand Biography. Te Ara – the Encyclopedia of New Zealand.
- "The National Council of Women". Ministry for Culture and Heritage. 13 January 2016.
- "Scholarship detail". Victoria University (Wellington).
- Stock, Rob (2 July 2017). "Bucking the system: How 50 years of decimal currency shows the emergence of an independent nation". Stuff. "The Queen was replaced by Kate Sheppard on ten dollar banknotes in 1991."
- "Ten Reasons Why the Women of New Zealand Should Vote". nzhistory.co.nz. Ministry for Culture and Heritage. 17 May 2017.
- "Top 100 New Zealand History Makers". Prime Television. Archived from the original on 2 April 2006.
- "Universal male suffrage introduced". nzhistory.co.nz. Ministry for Culture and Heritage. 24 November 2016.
- "Odeon Theatre". Heritage New Zealand.
