= Wilhelmina Sherriff Bain =

New Zealand teacher, librarian, feminist, peace activist and writer

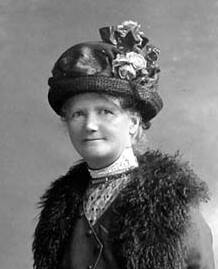
- Born: 5 September 1848; Midlothian, Edinburgh, Scotland
- Died: 26 January 1944 (aged 95); Auckland, New Zealand
- Occupations: Teacher, journalist, writer, peace activist
- Known for: Chair of the first meeting of the National Council of Women of New Zealand
- Relatives: James Walker Bain (brother)

Wilhelmina Sherriff Bain (5 September 1848 – 26 January 1944) was a Scottish-born New Zealand teacher, librarian, feminist, peace activist and writer.

== Early life ==
Sheriff Bain was born in Midlothian, near Edinburgh, Scotland, to John and Elizabeth Middlemass Bain. She had six siblings, one of whom, James Walker Bain, emigrated to Invercargill, New Zealand. Sheriff Bain, her parents and the remaining siblings followed him, travelling on the Gloucester and arriving in 1858.

== Career ==
Sheriff Bain became a teacher in 1879 and was a strong campaigner for equality for women teachers, who were often paid half the salary of male teachers. In 1894 her father died, and she moved to Christchurch, where she worked as a librarian and joined the Canterbury Women's Institute. She became the president, and in this role chaired the first meeting of the National Council of Women in 1896. Kate Sheppard was appointed the president of the council, Ada Wells secretary and Sheriff Bain treasurer.

She was a passionate advocate for peace and arbitration, and presented a number of papers on these topics at conventions and meetings. She was particularly opposed to the Boer War and in 1900 delivered a strong anti-war speech at the conference of the National Council of Women. Newspaper editors disliked her strident pacifism and the NCW distanced itself from her stance in order to avoid negative publicity.

In 1899 Sheriff Bain moved to Auckland, where she taught at Queen Victoria School for Maori Girls, and then to Taranaki in 1902. In 1901 she was elected New Zealand's representative on the International Council of Women's standing committee on peace and arbitration. In 1904 attended the ICW's Berlin conference, followed by the Thirteenth Universal Peace and Arbitration Congress in Boston, U.S. Before leaving she had secured a contract for a newspaper consortium to document her travels in Europe and North America, but her columns were rejected by editors who believed her political columns were 'interesting but not popular'.

From 1909 to 1913, Sheriff Bain lived in Riverton and worked as a journalist. She campaigned against compulsory military training, which New Zealand had introduced in 1909, and organised the Aparima Peace Union and, in Invercargill, the Women's Peace Society. She was also interested in issues of gender equality, equal pay, women jurors, prison reform and workers' rights.

In her 70s, Sheriff Bain had two books published in England: an anthology of poems, From Zealandia, and a novel, Service: a New Zealand story.

Sheriff Bain died in Auckland aged 95 on 26 January 1944.

== Personal life ==
Sheriff Bain was engaged to a man in Invercargill, John Clark, however he died before they were married. In 1914, she married a storekeeper, Robert Elliot, who died six years later. Bain took interest in the Baháʼí Faith and was a vegetarianism activist. Bain was an opponent of hunting and vivisection.

== Publications ==
- Bain, Wilhelmina Sherriff (1901). Human Betterment. ictoria University of Wellington Library, NZ: The Pamphlet Collection of Sir Robert Stout: Volume 76.
- Bain, Wilhelmina Sherriff (6 August 1913). "Bahaism Today (Part I)". The Otago Witness (Dunedin NZ). No. 3099. Papers Past, National Library of New Zealand.
- Bain, Wilhelmina Sherriff (6 August 1913). "Bahaism Today (Part II)". The Otago Witness (Dunedin NZ). No. 3100. Papers Past, National Library of New Zealand.
- Elliot, Wilhelmina Sherriff (Bain) (1925). From Zealandia: A Book of Verse (Papers Past, Books). London: John W. Watkins.
