= Odeon Theatre, Christchurch =

Theatre and former cinema in Christchurch, New Zealand

Odeon Theatre
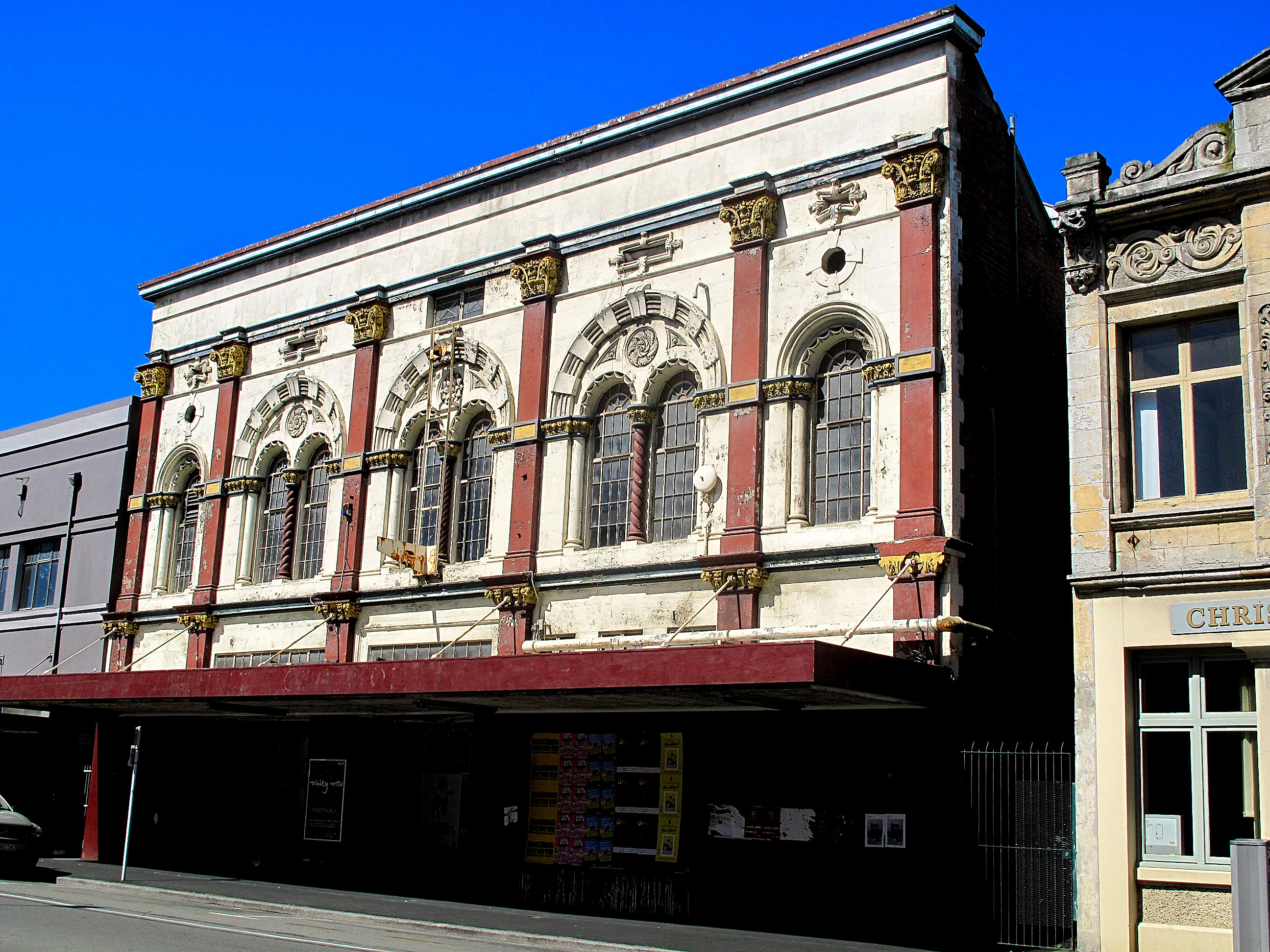
- The Odeon Theatre in Tuam Street, Christchurch (October 2010)
- Interactive map of the Odeon Theatre area
- Former names: Tuam Street Hall; Tuam Street Theatre; Opera House

General information
- Type: Former theatre
- Architectural style: Italianate architecture with Venetian Gothic elements
- Location: Christchurch Central City, 214 Tuam Street, Christchurch, New Zealand
- Coordinates: 43°32′8″S 172°38′21″E
- Completed: 1883
- Inaugurated: 20 July 1883; 142 years ago
- Renovated: 1927
- Destroyed: 22 February 2011
- Demolished: September 2012

Technical details
- Structural system: Unreinforced masonry
- Floor count: two

Design and construction
- Architect: Thomas Stoddart Lambert

Renovating team
- Architect: Sidney Luttrell

Heritage New Zealand – Category 1
- Designated: 26 November 1981
- Reference no.: 3140

References
- "Odeon Theatre". New Zealand Heritage List/Rārangi Kōrero. Heritage New Zealand.

The Odeon Theatre in Christchurch was the oldest masonry theatre in New Zealand, and one of only three remaining purpose-built 19th-century theatres in the country. The building has had different names over the years, and was put to many different uses. It was damaged beyond repair in the 22 February 2011 Christchurch earthquake and partially demolished in September 2012. The theatre was recognised as a Category I heritage building by the New Zealand Historic Places Trust, with registration number 3140. One of its most notable aspects was its use as a public meeting venue of Kate Sheppard during her women's suffrage campaign.

== History ==
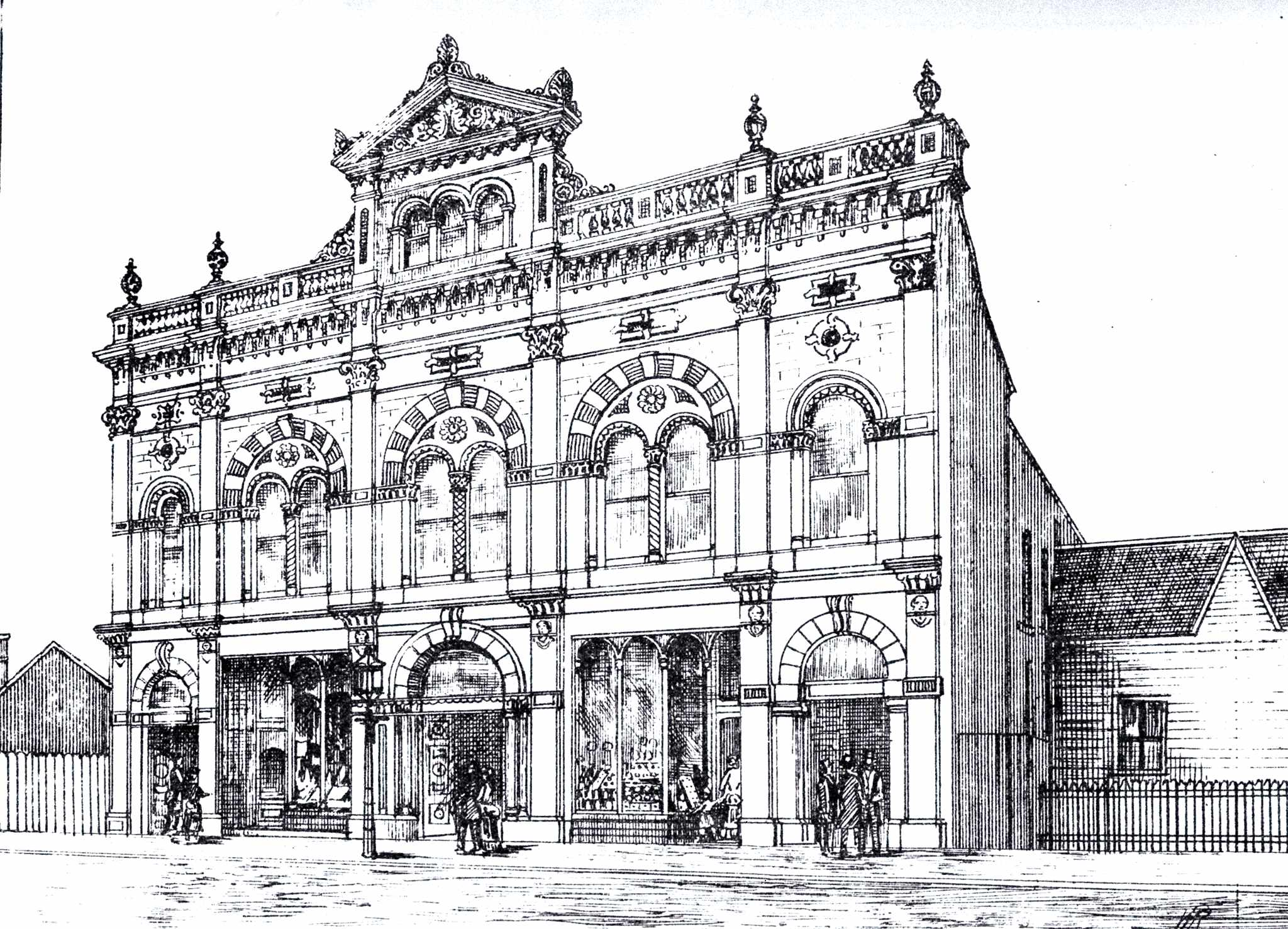
The original façade of the Tuam Street Hall including a significant parapet (removed in 1960)

A syndicate of citizens formed the Public Hall Company Ltd and through this commissioned the building. The theatre, located in 214 Tuam Street, was built in 1883 to a design by Thomas Stoddart Lambert (1840–1915). It had a capacity of 2,200 people, 600 of whom fitted into the gallery. The stage was initially 60 feet (18 m) wide and 40 feet (12 m) deep. The building was opened on 20 July 1883, with the Mayor of Christchurch, George Ruddenklau, presiding.

The building's original name was Tuam Street Hall or Tuam Street Theatre. The building had a variety of rather diverse uses: public meeting place, entertainment, exhibitions, roller skate rink, and other activities. In 1893, it was used by Kate Sheppard for women's suffrage. After the 1893 Electoral Act was passed on 19 September 1893, which meant that New Zealand women were the first in the world to be granted the right to vote, an enrolment meeting was held by Sheppard at Tuam Street Hall on 26 September in preparation for the 1893 election in late November. Despite rather unfavourable weather, 600 women were enrolled that day.

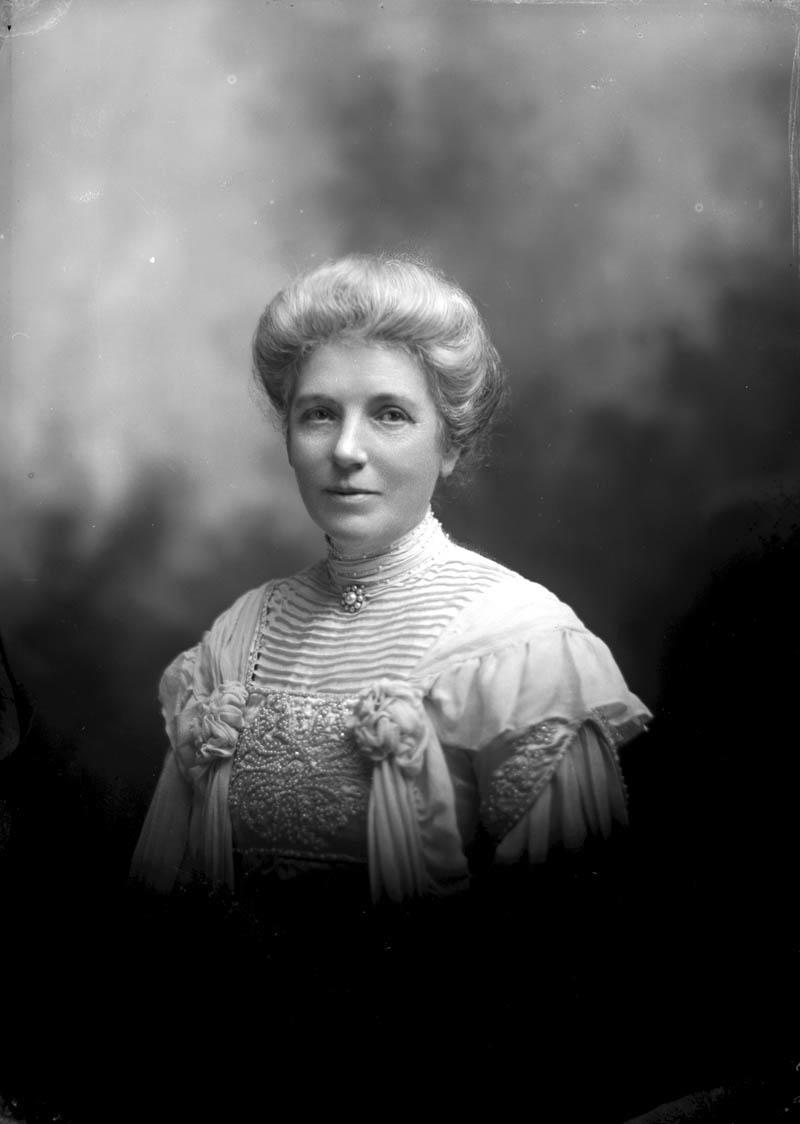
Kate Sheppard made extensive use of the Tuam Street Hall during her women's suffrage campaign

In 1894, the name changed to Opera House. Vaudeville was the main form of entertainment around the turn of the century, and John Fuller's son Benjamin started their theatre company's involvement with the building in 1903.

Sidney Luttrell was commissioned to remodel the building's interior, and the modified space opened on 26 December 1927, providing seating for 1,300 people. The dimensions of the stage were changed to 60 feet (18 m) wide, 60 feet (18 m) deep, and 40 feet (12 m) high, and there were then 19 dressing rooms. With the introduction of film in 1930, the name was once again changed, this time to St James. The stage remained, though, and the building was sometimes used for other purposes, for example live entertainment. St James closed for a period during the Great Depression. Notable performers during the 1940s include the Trapp Family Singers, Stanley Holloway, Johnny Devlin, Laurence Olivier, and Olivier's second wife Vivien Leigh.

Ownership changed in 1960 to Kerridge-Odeon Ltd, and the building was renamed Odeon and reopened on 27 September 1960. Extensive changes were undertaken, including the removal of the parapet, reduction of seating down to 720, updating of the cinema equipment, and introduction of a coffee lounge. Through competition with television, patronage declined and the theatre eventually closed. The building was purchased in 1983 by the Sydenham Assembly of God, who used it for religious gatherings from 1985.

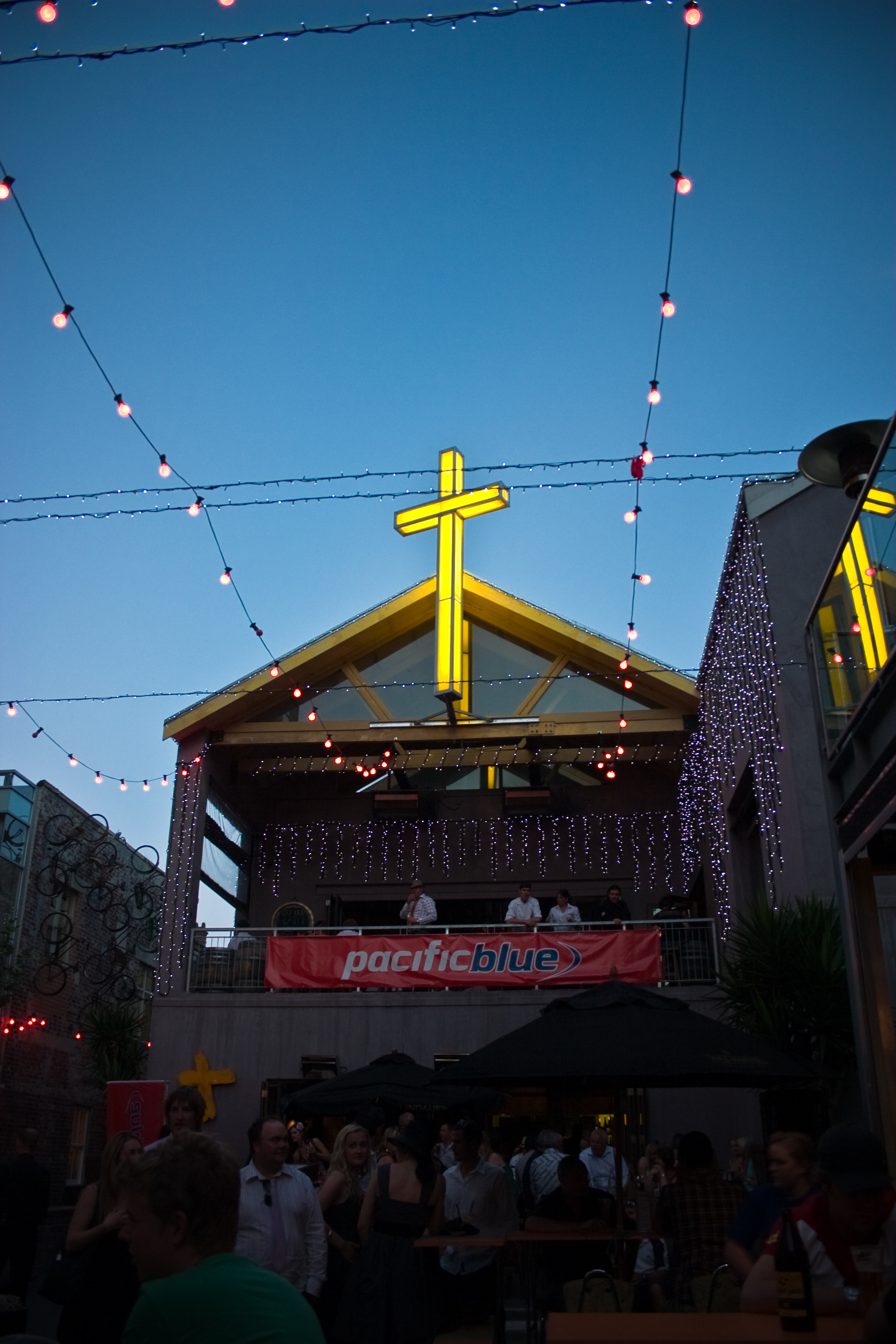
The Yellow Cross bar in SOL Square, utilising the cross from the Odeon Theatre fitted by the Sydenham Assembly of God

The building was bought in 2003 by a group of businessmen, who in May 2004 applied for demolition consent. In response, the Odeon Theatre Trust was formed by residents concerned for the preservation of the building. Ownership changed again in December 2006, when Property Ventures Ltd, the development company of David Henderson, purchased it. Property Ventures had its office in a building diagonally opposite the Odeon Theatre at 179 Tuam Street. When Henderson's companies got into financial difficulties, Christchurch City Council controversially bought five of his inner city land holdings in August 2008, but not the Odeon Theatre. Henderson was placed in bankruptcy in November 2010.

During the years of the Sydenham Assembly of God ownership, a large yellow illuminated cross was displayed on the theatre's frontage (the bracket still visible in photos post-2008). Henderson used the cross in the SOL Square development (located on the north side of the Property Ventures head office) and styled one of the bars as the Yellow Cross, prominently displaying the cross on the roof apex.

In 2009, Christchurch actor and director Mark Hadlow campaigned for the Odeon Theatre to be turned into an arts complex for an estimated NZ$60m.

== Heritage listing ==
On 26 November 1981, the building was registered by the New Zealand Historic Places Trust (now Heritage New Zealand) as a Category I historic place, with the registration number 3140. The building is recognised as the once largest public meeting venue in Christchurch, the oldest remaining theatre in Christchurch, and the then country's oldest masonry theatre. Of significance is the use of the building by Kate Sheppard. Another aspect is the building's association with two important Christchurch designers, Lambert and S. Luttrell. Its category I listing recognises it as a place of "special or outstanding historical or cultural heritage significance or value".

== Earthquake damage ==
The building was severely damaged in the February 2011 Christchurch earthquake. Demolition was ordered by the Canterbury Earthquake Recovery Authority in January 2012 and partially carried out later that year. The building's heritage status meant that the facade and upper and lower foyers were retained when the auditorium, seating, and fly tower were demolished. The front of the building was protected by a stack of shipping containers placed in Tuam Street, which took up a lane of traffic. For years the Odeon was on the City Council's "Dirty 30" list of derelict buildings awaiting demolition or development.

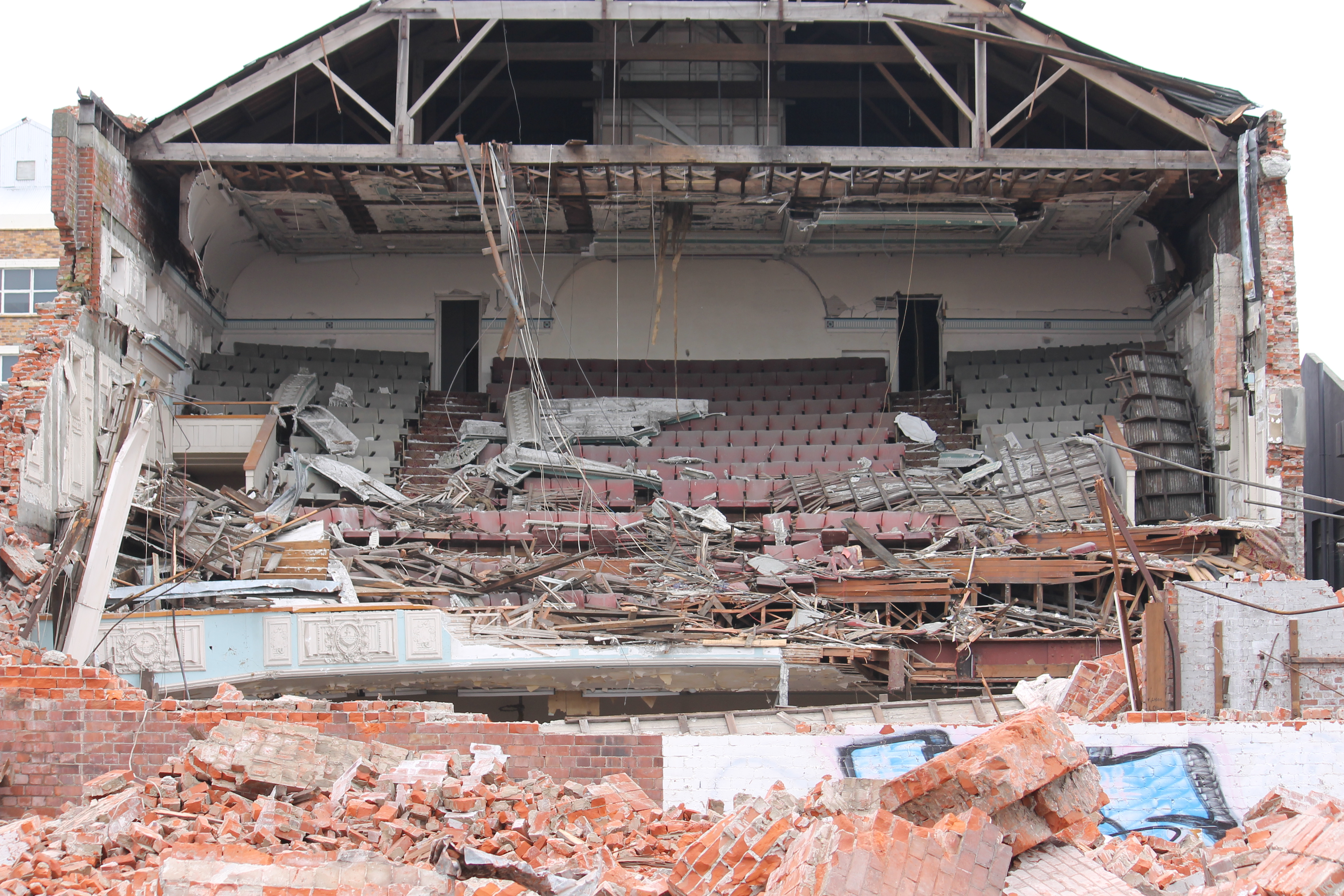
Demolition during 2012

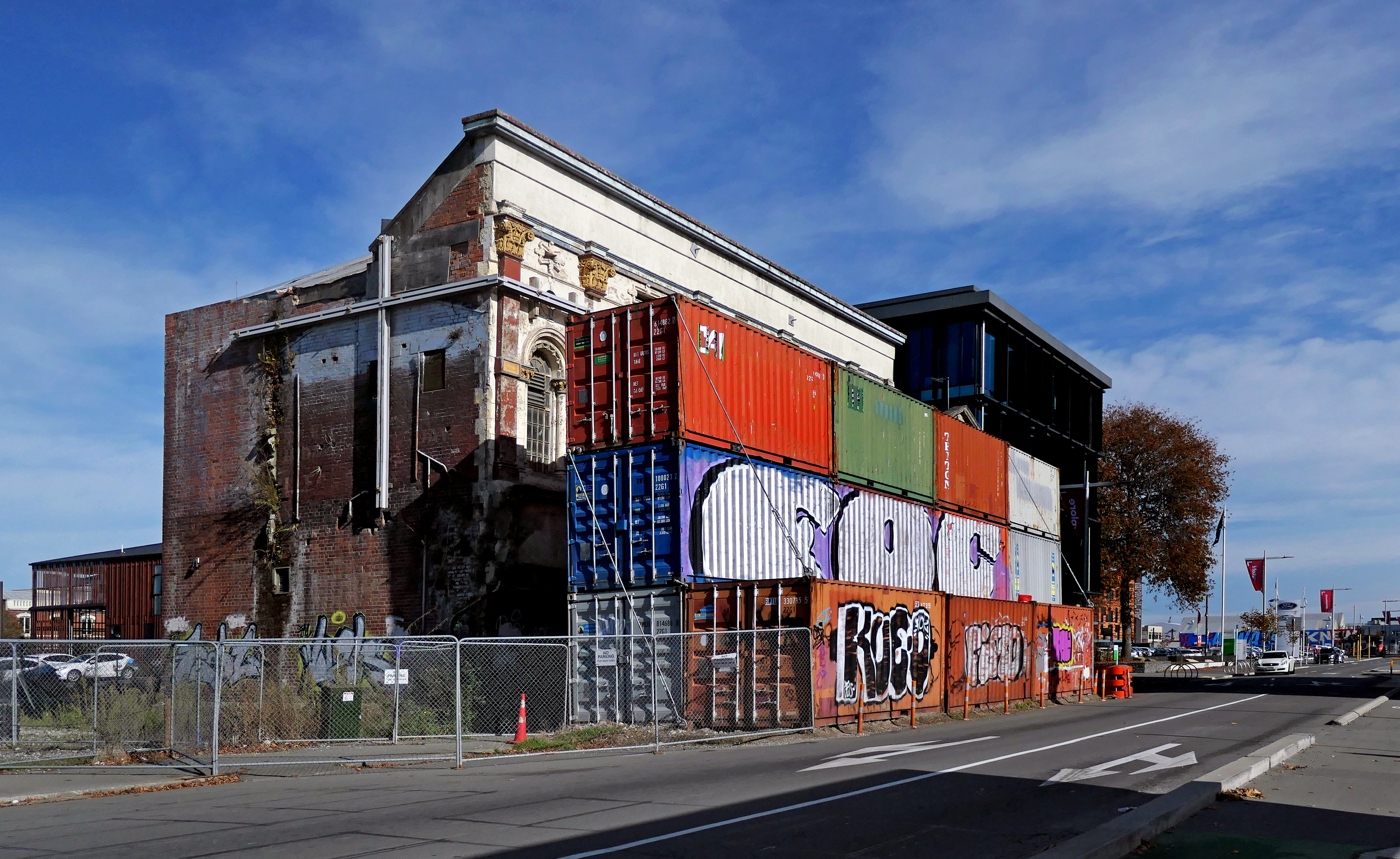
Container wall in 2019

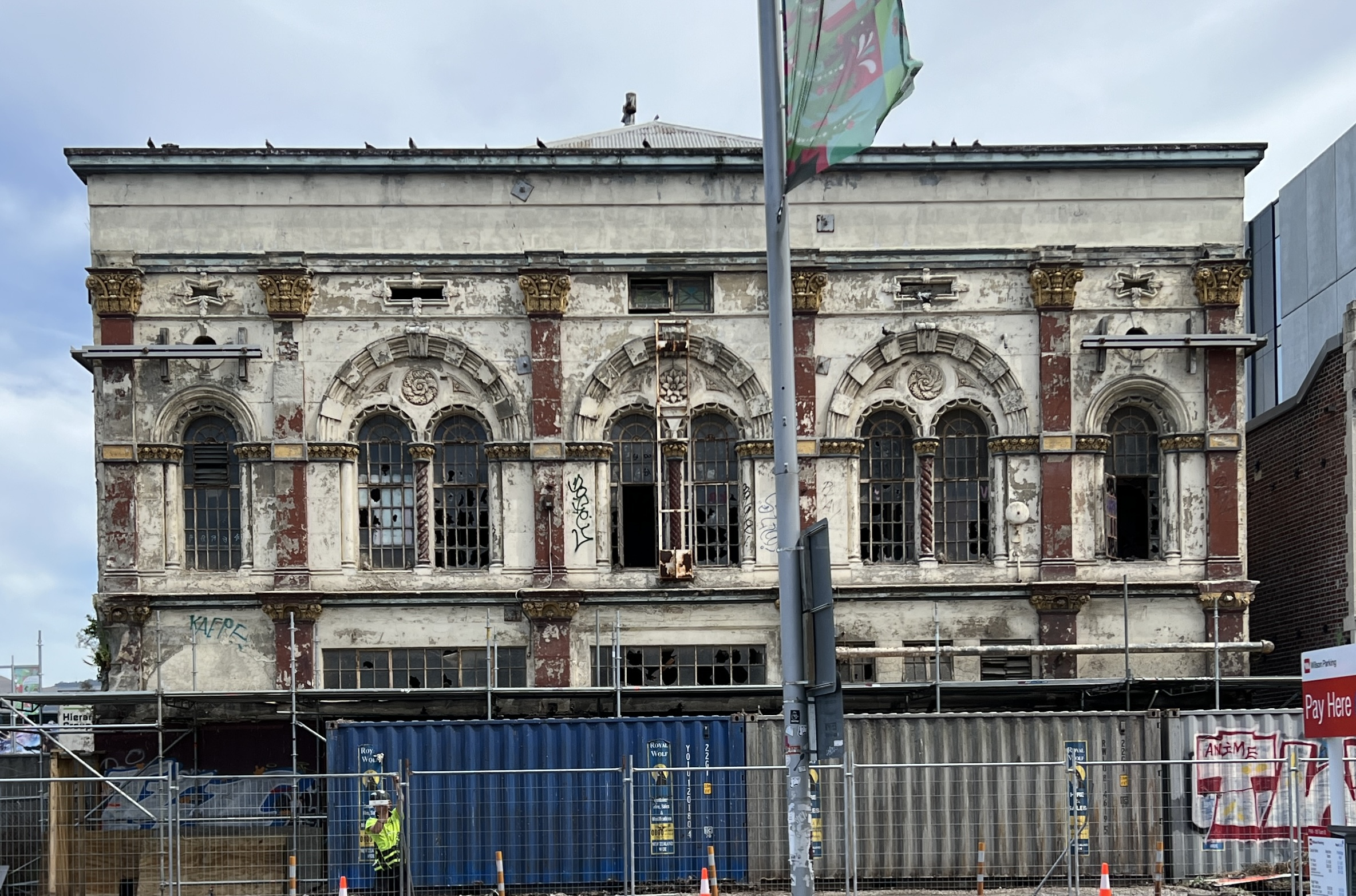
Containers removed, 2024

In August 2020 the Regional Council Environment Canterbury (ECan) purchased the Odeon and the neighbouring Lawrie and Wilson Auctioneers building, which together adjoin its Christchurch offices, from the central government agency Ōtākaro Ltd by auction for $2.95 million. Ecan also bought an empty section to the south of its offices on St Asaph St for $1.68 million. A sub-committee had been formed 15 days before to decide upon the purchase; only one of the members had experience managing heritage buildings, and he recommended that the Odeon's facade be demolished. Nevertheless the purchase went ahead. The goal was to even up ECan's "oddly-shaped" office site, control development around its headquarters, and create a precinct for Canterbury environmental organisations. In March 2022, ECan began tendering for business partners for the theatre's restoration, and in 2023 unsuccessfully approached developers about a public-private partnership to develop and lease the property. The shipping containers in front of the Odeon were removed by order of the City Council in January 2024, and ECan was required to stabilise and support the facade. After failing to find a private sector partner to help, ECan then spent $1.2 million to brace and stabilise (but not restore) the facade; discovery of previously-unknown underground services led to it going 20% over its original budget.

In June 2025 ECan decided to sell the Odeon Theatre and the neighbouring vacant land. Keeping the property was costing the Regional Council $350,000–400,00 a year in maintenance, rates, and interest on the loan; none of these costs were budgeted for in their long-term plan, and the property and its neighbour had cost ECan $8 million to date. Developers were invited to develop the corner section on Manchester Street, near Te Kaha starium, but anyone purchasing the Odeon's facade would be unlikely to get permission to demolish it given its heritage status.

== See also ==
- List of oldest buildings in Christchurch
