= Canterbury Women's Institute =

New Zealand think tank and women's rights organisation

- Formation: 1892
- Type: Political think tank
- Location: Christchurch, New Zealand

The Canterbury Women's Institute was a privately funded think tank based in Christchurch, New Zealand, which existed from November 1892 until November 1921. Its primary scope involved the study of and advocacy for women's rights. Originally non-partisan, the Institute became more left-leaning and supportive of specific political parties.

== Origins ==
The Canterbury Women's Institute (CWI) was convened after an initial meeting called in September 1892. The CWI's first official meeting on 25 November of that same year elected as president Mary Caroline Douglas née Foster, wife of Sir Arthur Percy Douglas, 5th Baronet, Under-Secretary for Defence, New Zealand. The group then created four departments with the following conveners:

- literary (learning the classics to "raise the tone of women's ideas and conversation") – Edith Searle Grossmann;
- economics (civics, equal pay and understanding women's roles as "units of the industrial army")- Kate Sheppard;
- health (physiology and diseases, "thorough physical training") – Isabella May
- domestic science ("cooking, laundry work, dressmaking, the management of money and the rearing of children") – Elizabeth Parker Garsia, née Watson (1850–1896)

The committees met to raise issues to research, write papers to read to each other, hold debates on important social and political questions, lead adult education classes, and publish open letters when resolutions were voted on successfully. Each committee had an executive council of women activists (for example, Ada Wells was the founding secretary in the economics committee) who would go on later in life to take on important leadership roles at the national level as well. Membership was limited to those women who were elected by the Institute members, though large numbers of women and men would come to special meetings. Unlike the later Women's Institutes in New Zealand, the CWI aimed to encourage the development of empowered women fully involved in the male political world. The CWI was more akin to the Franchise Leagues of Dunedin and Auckland formed about the same time to counter the anti-suffrage sentiments of the time.

== Impact ==
By 1894 the CWI combined the four departments and operated as a single committee to organise public meetings and conferences. With Annie E. Hookham as chair, the CWI held a conference in November which included representatives from the Women's Christian Temperance Union of New Zealand, Progressive Liberal Association, Freethought Association, Teachers' Institute, Church of England Temperance Society, Society for Social Ethics, Tailoresses' Union, Knights of Labour, New Zealand Workers' Union, Rational Dress Association, and the Alalanta Cycling Club. They passed several resolutions regarding women's rights and agreed that the Canterbury Women's Institute would organise periodical public meetings of women.

In February 1895, upon receiving a request for support from the Gisborne Women's Political Association, the CWI resolved to fund for three months the costs for public meetings of another "Women's Convention" to which women's organisations would be invited. The annual report of the CWI concluded that the combined efforts of their affiliated women's organisations would work "towards the uplifting of public opinion in matters pertaining to the elevation and dignity of our country and race" and that they would "steadily recruit the thinkers among our women."

The meetings of "the Committee of the Canterbury Women's Institute" were at first held at the Young Men's Christian Association then at the Chancery Lane Hall in Christchurch.

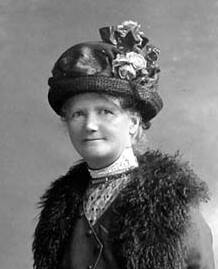
Wilhelmina Sherriff Bain

Encouraged by conversations with the Dunedin Women's Franchise League, the CWI's annual meeting on 8 February 1896, resolved the organise a convention that would consider a more formal confederation of women's organisations around the country. The "Women's Convention" called by Wilhelmina Sherriff Bain, president of the Canterbury Women's Institute, in April 1896 was held in the Provincial Council Chambers on Durham Street in Christchurch. At this meeting, with representatives from 11 women's societies, it was agreed that a National Council of Women of New Zealand would be established.

Much of the CWI's work in the following years was to organise campaigns to help elect women to local boards and political office. The CWI continued as before to promote women's health (including campaigns against corseting and dress reform. The radicalisation of the CWI leadership—such as Wilhelmina Sherriff Bain, Sarah Saunders Page and Ada Wells—influenced the CWI to promote peace activities even though this became unpopular in the years before and during World War I.

== Permanent recess ==
By November 1921, according to the minutes of the National Council of Women Christchurch Branch, the few remaining members of the CWI agreed they would go into "recess indefinitely."

== See also ==
- National Council of Women of New Zealand
- Wilhelmina Sherriff Bain
- List of think tanks in New Zealand
