= Kitty Lovell-Smith =

New Zealand linotype operator and shop manager

- Born: 10 July 1886; Riccarton
- Died: 3 February 1973 (aged 86); Riccarton

Hilda Kate Lovell-Smith (10 July 1886 – 3 February 1973), generally known as Kitty Lovell-Smith, was a New Zealand businesswoman and community organiser.

== Early life ==
Lovell-Smith was born at Riccarton, in Christchurch, New Zealand, in 1886. She was the third daughter of ten children born to Mary Jane (Jennie) Cumberworth, a former teacher, and her husband, William Sidney Smith, a printer. Both her parents were good friends of Kate Sheppard, a leading New Zealand suffragist, and Lovell-Smith was given "Kate" as her middle name in honour of Sheppard.

Lovell-Smith attended Riccarton School for her primary school education and was home-schooled as a teenager.

== Adult life ==
Lovell-Smith joined the family printing business, Smith and Anthony Limited, when she was 17 years old. She began as a Linotype operator and was later the manager of the retail stationery section.

She joined the Christchurch branch of the National Council of Women of New Zealand and became secretary in 1918, a position she held until 1927, when she became dominion secretary. In 1930, she attended the quinquennial conference of the International Council of Women in Vienna, Austria. On her return to New Zealand, Lovell-Smith joined the YWCA and was appointed general secretary of the Timaru branch in 1932. In 1937, she moved to Dunedin and became the general secretary of the Dunedin YWCA, and from 1945 to 1947 she was general secretary for the Hamilton YWCA.

In 1947, she returned to live in Christchurch and continued her community work: in November 1949 she was made founding president of the Soroptimist Club of Christchurch. She also joined the local women’s unemployment committee, the Canterbury Women’s Club, the United Nations Association of New Zealand and CORSO. In 1953, she was awarded the Queen Elizabeth II Coronation Medal.

In the 1960s, Lovell-Smith edited the journal of the New Zealand branch of the Pan-Pacific and South-East Asia Women’s Association. She also continued her work with the National Council of Women, joining the executive of the Christchurch branch and chairing a number of committees. She was president of the branch from 1951 to 1955, and in 1956 was appointed a dominion life member. She continued to attend National Council of Women meetings until over the age of 80.

Lovell-Smith was also a writer and editor. From 1952 until 1960, she was assistant editor of the National Council of Women’s New Zealand Women in Council; she wrote a history of the Christchurch YWCA, published in 1961, and a history of the Christchurch branch of the National Council of Women.

Lovell-Smith died at her family home in Riccarton on 3 February 1973.
