= Isabella May =

New Zealand temperance worker and suffragist (1850–1926)

- Born: Isabella Malcolm; 22 June 1850; Hoxton, London, England
- Died: 1 May 1926 (aged 75); Kingston upon Thames, Surrey, England
- Occupation: Social reformer
- Relatives: Kate Sheppard (sister)

Isabella May (née Malcolm; 22 June 1850 – 1 May 1926) was a New Zealand temperance worker, suffragist and one of the founders of Rational Dress Society.

== Early life ==
May was born in Hoxton, London, England, on 22 June 1850, and was the younger sister of suffragist Kate Sheppard. She arrived in New Zealand in 1869 with her mother, Kate, and their two brothers. In 1879, ten years after landing in Christchurch, she married Henry Ernest May. They had four children together.

== Political work ==
May would work alongside other feminists and social activists to enact changes in New Zealand. Her efforts would be recognised abroad for her role in the Women's Christian Temperance Union New Zealand.

May joined the Christchurch branch of the Women's Christian Temperance Union New Zealand (WCTU NZ) when it was first formed under the guidance of Mary Clement Leavitt in 1885. She served as the founding superintendent of hygiene and went on to lead this department at the national level. She worked to advocate for dress reform for children and women. She traveled to London and served as the WCTU NZ representative for the council of the Women's Liberal Federation. She spoke at a meeting of the Society for the Abolition of the State Regulation of Vice at which the British activist Josephine Butler was president.

When the Canterbury Women's Institute (CWI) was established in 1892, May led the hygiene department. Because this department became too radical in that first year, emphasising dress reform and wholefoods diets, the CWI decided to stop separating out in different departments.

In 1897, May became president of the CWI. She continued her leadership in the WCTU NZ and campaigned against the Contagious Diseases Acts of 1869 still on the books in New Zealand.

== Later life and death ==
May travelled with her family in China around 1900 then settled near London where she continued her work for women's rights. She died at her home in Kingston upon Thames on 1 May 1926.
