= William Baverstock =

New Zealand photographer and gallery director (1893–1975)

William Baverstock OBE
- Born: 2 August 1893; Norwich, Norfolk, England
- Died: 11 October 1975 (aged 82); Christchurch
- Education: Canterbury College School of Art
- Known for: Caricatures, photography, design and art museum management
- Elected: New Zealand Society of Artists, Honorary Life Member of the Canterbury Society of Arts, Vice Chairman AGMANZ

William Sykes Baverstock (2 August 1893 – 11 October 1975) was an illustrator, photographer, arts administrator and the first Director of the Robert McDougall Art Gallery in Christchurch, New Zealand.

== Early history ==
Baverstock was born in Norwich, Norfolk, England. His parents William and Alice Baverstock (née Sykes) moved to Christchurch in 1901 when Baverstock was eight for his father to take charge of the lithographic department at The Press newspaper. Baverstock senior was an artist, designer and was skilled in drawing. Baverstock began his early schooling at a private school in Norwich and went on to attend West Christchurch District High School. By the age of 13 he had proved himself as talented in drawing and won a local Art Society children’s art competition. In 1910 he went to work in his father’s department at The Press where he remained for the next 18 years. He was also able to attend the Canterbury College School of Art where he excelled in drawing and caricature. In 1915 Baverstock was awarded a First Class pass for Drawing from Life. (Same class as Ngaio Marsh) He later said of his talent, ‘I must admit, too, that although I attended art school for some time, my appreciation of good drawing came mostly from my father.’

== Career ==
Baverstock established himself as an artist and key player in the Christchurch arts community from an early age and showed at the Canterbury Society of Arts (CSA) regularly from 1913 when he also received a CSA Diploma for Caricature. By 1917 he had joined the CSA as a working member which he remained until 1972. Throughout the 1930s and into the 1940s Baverstock continued with his personal art and design practice. His illustrations, caricatures and photography were often used as illustrations in magazines and journals. His work also attracted national attention with his designs published as first day covers for the Health Camp movement and his drawings and caricatures exhibited in major exhibitions such as the New Zealand Centennial. Throughout this period he continued to develop his interests in arts administration and in 1934 he was elected to the council of the New Zealand Society of Artists and in 1943 became Secretary / Treasurer of the Canterbury Society of Arts. He filled this role for the next 16 years. It was said on his retirement that during his tenure he had signed more than10,000 receipts, taken only one day off for illness, and managed 31 large-scale exhibitions.

=== The Group ===
In 1927, Baverstock was sharing a studio with other former students from the art school including Cora Wilding, Margaret Anderson, William Montgomery, Ngaio Marsh, Evelyn Polson, and Edith Collier and together they formed the influential The Group The first exhibition was held in the studio at 109 Cashel Street which had been the old linotype room of The Press. Two years later Baverstock was one of nine artists in the first Group Show to be presented together with a full catalogue of works which was held in the CSA’s Durham Street Gallery. He also acted as The Group’s spokesperson, exhibited in a number of early shows, and later was one of the 33 artists, including Colin McCahon, Toss Woollaston, Doris Lusk, Rita Angus and Rata Lovell-Smith, selected for the 1947 20 Year Retrospective Group Show.

=== The Savage Club ===
Baverstock joined the Savage Club in 1922 and remained a member for over 50 years. The Club was a men’s only social club at this time devoted to cultural activities. Baverstock became known as its ‘honorary caricaturist’. As well as participating in the cultural activities of the club Baverstock was also active in committee work and particularly in the Clubs’ efforts to develop Health Camps. Later, in 1935, he was appointed to the management committee of Children's Health Camps which was responsible for planning the health camps of New Zealand.

=== Robert McDougall Art Gallery ===
In December 1948 Baverstock was appointed Honorary Curator of the Robert McDougall Art Gallery and continued working at both the Gallery and the CSA for the next 11 years. His appointment came after considerable criticism of the Gallery from the CSA demanding increased funding for purchases and the appointment of a curator. Such criticism often came via Baverstock himself. The new position was largely administrative with little independence as the City Council had to approve all purchases as well as programming. Baverstock now filled two demanding positions. John Simpson, who headed the Canterbury College Art School, recalled that Baverstock was usually to be found at the CSA ‘behind locked doors.’ He then ‘would precede to the Robert McDougall Art Gallery, which he opened to the public from 2pm until 4:30pm’. The appointment to the McDougall came at a controversial moment with Baverstock represented on both sides of what would become a long-lasting controversy over the purchase and gifting of the painting The Pleasure Garden by Frances Hodgkins to the Robert McDougall collection. In 1951, when the gift was eventually accepted Baverstock promised it a, 'most prominent position—in the gallery.’ In 1960, after 12 years as Honorary Curator, Baverstock was appointed Director of the Robert McDougall Art Gallery. He was still required to run the Gallery virtually single-handed under 'unenviable conditions'.

As the McDougall’s director he presented a number of contemporary exhibitions including:

- 1960 Contemporary New Zealand Painting and Barbara Hepworth Sculpture
- 1961 Paintings from the Pacific
- 1962 Recent British Sculpture
- 1964 Three British Painters
- 1965 Painting in Australia: Nineteenth and Twentieth Centuries, Henry Moore, The James Michener Collection of American Paintings and New Zealand Painting 1965
- 1966 Aspects of New British Art
- 1967 Marcel Duchamp: The Mary Sisler Collection
- 1968 Australian Sculpture Exhibition
- 1969 Frances Hodgkins (1869–1947) Centennial Memorial Exhibition

Throughout the 1960s Baverstock was also able to bring important works into the collection featuring Canterbury content including works by Petrus Van der Velden, J C Hoyte and John Gibbs. but the overall tone of the Gallery during Baverstock’s directorship was the presentation of traditional and conservative art. This approach embroiled Baverstock in yet another controversy in 1969 when a City Councillor insisted on the removal of two works from the Marcel Duchamp exhibition. They included the readymade urinal Fountain (1917). Art students in protest brought a chamber pot to the opening and placed it in the exhibition. Fountain was too much for Baverstock who told the press, ‘I don't mind a bit of good clean fun in the art world—but you have to draw the line somewhere… Fountain belongs to a display of plumbing.’ By 1968 a petition A Desirable Public Gallery for Christchurch was circulating around the Christchurch art scene, a sign of growing impatience with Baverstock’s conservative positioning. The following year he retired at the age of 76, the local press commended his dedication, ‘He managed 90 major exhibitions for the Christchurch City Council, and 31 for the Arts Society. For many of these he prepared the catalogues and wrote all the advertising. In addition, he developed a print lending scheme and, without fee, attended to hundreds of inquiries about works of art.’ Baverstock was replaced by 26 year old Brian Muir. The effect of Muir’s appointment in 1969 would be dramatic. As art historian and curator Athol McCredie noted, the budget for purchasing artworks increasing from $2,000 in 1968/69 to $30,000 in 1974 with the collection grew dramatically from 610 items owned by the gallery in 1969 to 1,791 in 1976. Baverstock died on 11 October 1975 in Christchurch.

== Awards and recognition ==
- 1934 Elected to the council of the New Zealand Society of Artists.
- Elected as a Fellow of the Royal Society of Arts.
- 1960 Appointed Honorary Life Member of the Canterbury Society of Arts.
- 1968 Awarded an OBE for services to the arts.
- 1969 Elected Vice Chairman of AGMANZ.
- 1973 Exhibition of Baverstock’s caricatures, designs and drawings presented at the CSA Gallery.
- 1973 The Baverstock Memorial Lecture ‘to promote understanding between the Māori and the Europeans’ was instituted at the Canterbury Museum.
- 1980 In Memory of William Sykes Baverstock, O.B.E., F.R.S.A. a memorial booklet published by H S Baverstock.

== Collections ==
- National Library
- Te Papa Tongarewa Museum of New Zealand
