= Kate Sheppard Memorial Trust Award =

Annual award in New Zealand

The Kate Sheppard Memorial Trust Award is an award made annually on 19 September, known as Suffrage Day, in New Zealand. This day is the anniversary of women winning the right to vote in New Zealand in 1893.

The award commemorates the life of a leading New Zealand women's suffrage campaigner, Kate Sheppard, and was established by a group of women from Christchurch who had also commissioned the Kate Sheppard National Memorial. Its aim is to assist a woman to develop her potential through study, research or training in an area of value to the community. Although the award is open to any woman, it has been noted that the large majority of applications come from university and polytechnic institute students.

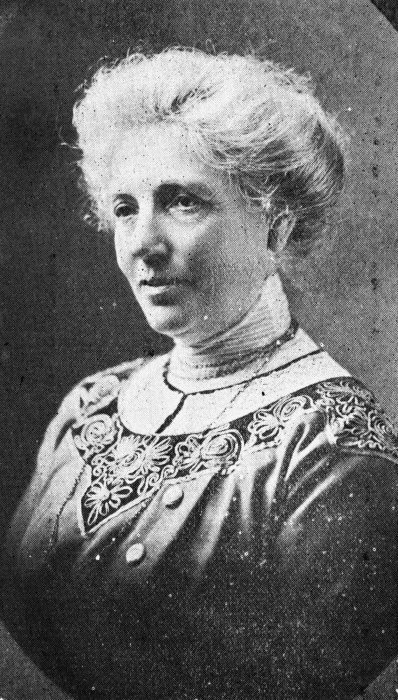
Kate Sheppard, circa 1914. Photographer unidentified.

The selection panel is made up of representatives of Christchurch City Council, National Council of Women, NZ Council of Trade Unions, Rural Women of New Zealand and YWCA.

== Recipients ==
- 2005 – Tessa Giblin
- 2006 – Lisa Woods
- 2007 – Maria Rowe
- 2008 – Fiona Shanhun, a 27-year-old PhD student at Lincoln University, who is researching Antarctica soils as a means of unravelling past climate conditions in the ice-free areas of the continent.
- 2009 – Bethany Edmunds, a Ngāti Kurī woman and a Masters of Art and Visual Culture: Costume Studies student at New York University.
- 2010 – Dr Sunyoung Ma, a 29-year-old senior lecturer at the University of Otago, who is researching the most ideal rehabilitation options for patients who have complete tooth loss.
- 2011 – Kimberley Twigden, a 22-year-old PhD student at the University of Auckland, who is researching a seismic resilient building system.
- 2012 – Helen Tsui, a clinical psychology student at the University of Otago, who was studying diagnostic tests for Alzheimer's disease.
- 2013 – Sylvia Nissen, a 23-year-old PhD student at the University of Canterbury, conducting research into the shaping of young people's political expression.
- 2014 – No award made
- 2015 – Dr Rashi Karunasinghe, a 27-year-old PhD graduate of the University of Auckland, who conducted research into stroke-related brain injuries.
- 2016 – Amber Maree Kale, a 27-year-old master's degree student at Victoria University, who is conducting a community-based research project where Wellington hosts create murals with former refugees to explore concepts of home, belonging, and visibility.
- 2017 – No award made
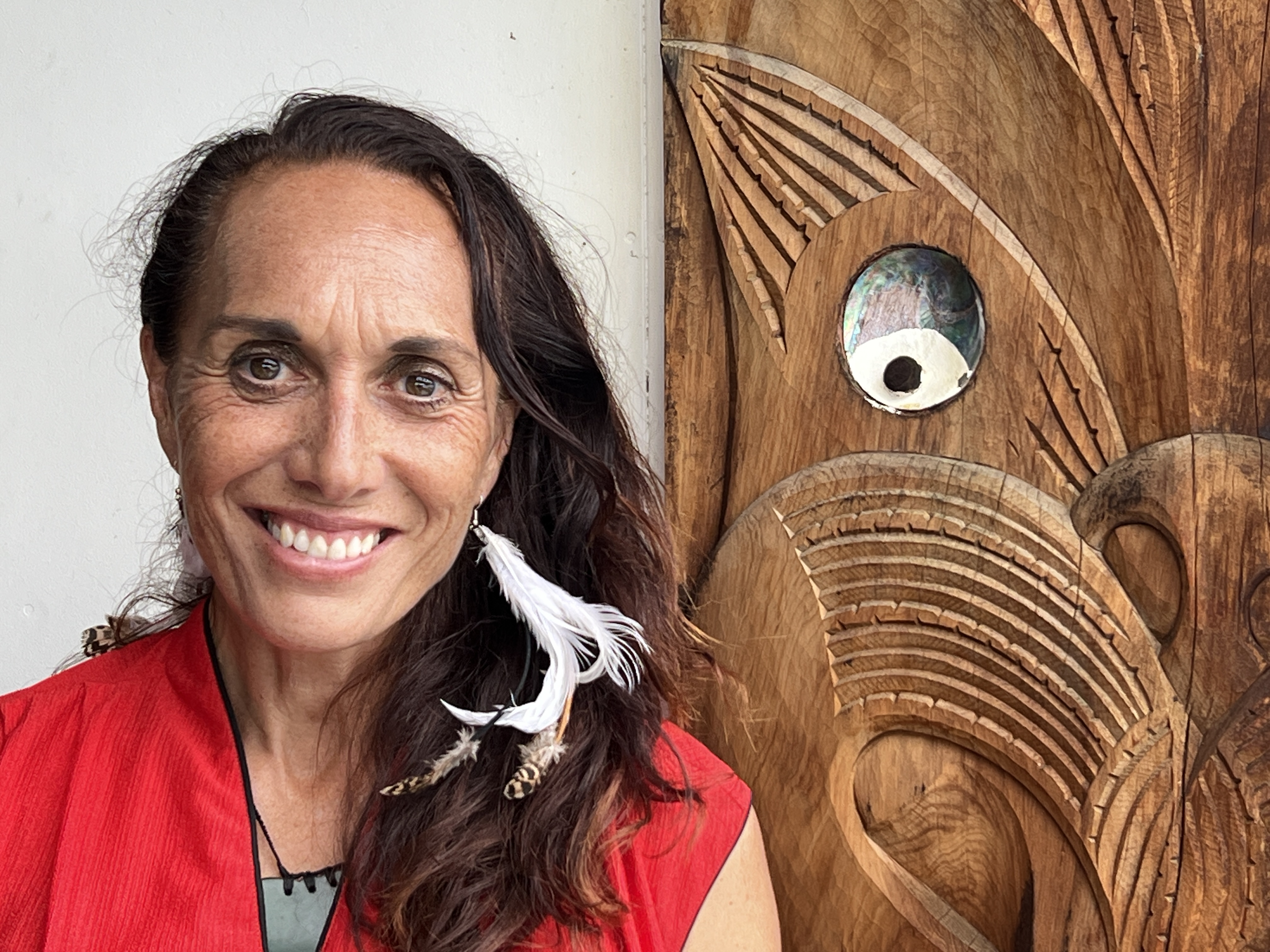
  Kelly Tikao at Ōnuku, in February 2025
- 2018 – Kelly Waiana Tikao, a Registered Nurse and PhD student at the University of Canterbury, who is researching Kāi Tahu birthing traditions and practices related to conception, pregnancy and birth.
- 2019 – No award made
- 2020 – Laura Keenan, for PhD research on yield prediction tools for a national forage database.
- 2021 – No award made due to economic conditions

== See also ==
- List of awards honoring women
