= William Habens =

New Zealand Congregational minister and educationalist

William James Habens (17 June 1839 – 3 February 1899) was a New Zealand Congregational minister and educationalist. He was born in Brighton, Sussex, England on 17 June 1839. He and his wife emigrated to Christchurch, New Zealand, arriving on 10 January 1864. He was the first minister of the Trinity Congregational Church in Christchurch and held this post until 1877. He was deeply involved in educational matters and taught as a classics master at the High School of Christchurch from 1868 where he eventually became a rector. He became the inspector general of schools in the newly created Department of Education in Wellington in 1878. He became the secretary for education in 1886.
