= Trinity Congregational Church, Christchurch =

Trinity Congregational Church
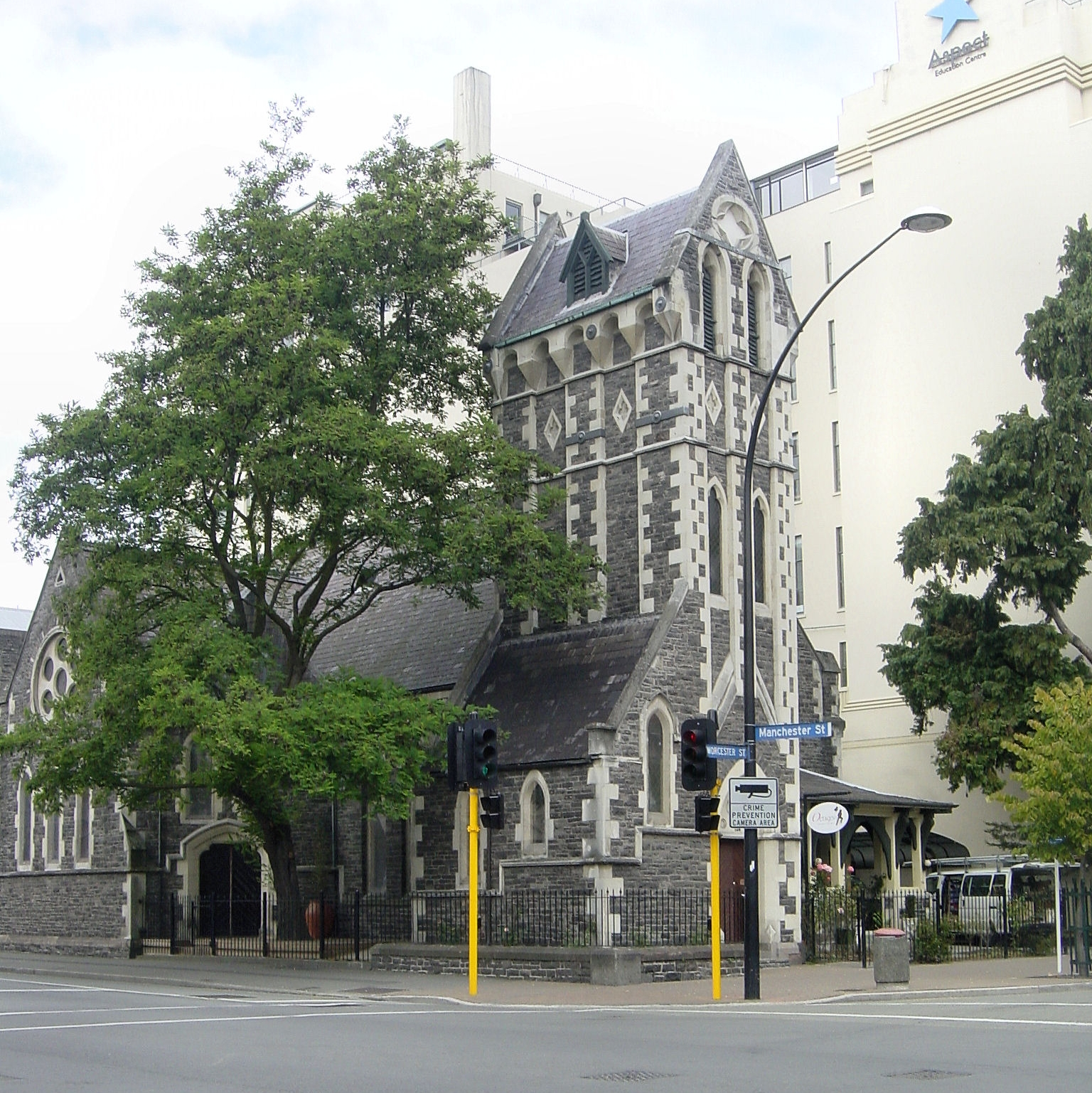
- Trinity Congregational Church
- 43°31′52″S 172°38′22″E
- Address: 124 Worcester Street, central business district, Christchurch
- Country: New Zealand
- Previous denomination: Congregationalism

History
- Status: Church (1864 – 1974); Commercial use (since 1974)
- Events: 2010 Canterbury earthquake; 2011 Christchurch earthquake

Architecture
- Architect: Benjamin Mountfort
- Architectural type: Church
- Style: Early French Gothic Revival
- Years built: 1864–1870
- Closed: 1974 (as a church)

Specifications
- Materials: Oamaru stone and rubble

Heritage New Zealand – Category 1
- Official name: Trinity Congregational Church (Former)
- Designated: 4 April 1985
- Reference no.: 306

The Trinity Church or Trinity Congregational Church designed by Benjamin Mountfort, later called the State Trinity Centre, is a Category I heritage building listed with Heritage New Zealand. Damaged in the 2010 Canterbury earthquake and red-stickered after the February 2011 Christchurch earthquake, the building was threatened with demolition like most other central city heritage buildings. In June 2012, it was announced that the building would be saved, repaired and earthquake strengthened. The building, post its church status, has housed some commercial operations, including the State Trinity Centre; 'The Octagon' (2006–2010); and later, following earthquake repairs, a business called 'The Church Brew Pub' (2023–present).

== Geography ==
The building is located on the south-west corner of Worcester and Manchester Streets. The three buildings on the south side of the section of Worcester Street leading into Cathedral Square are all registered heritage buildings and together, they form an important setting. The neighbouring buildings are the State Insurance Building, an art deco office tower designed by Cecil Wood and registered as Category II, and the Old Government Building designed by Joseph Maddison and registered as Category I.

== History ==
=== Early beginnings ===
The Congregational church was brought to New Zealand by Barzillai Quaife. Congregationalists had their first meeting in Christchurch in 1861. Meetings were held at Bonnington's Hall until July 1864, when that property changed hands and was no longer available. A society was formed, four members raised funds (Samuel Farr, Mr Gee, James Jameson and Mr Lewis) and members bought the property on the south-west corner of the Manchester and Worcester Streets intersection for a church. Farr was chosen as the architect for the original church and the affairs were progressed by the first minister, William Habens. The original church, built in stone, was opened with a series of opening services starting on 23 November 1864.

By 1870, the church had become too small for the congregation, and there were problems with ventilation. Four architects were invited to provide designs for a new building: Farr, Benjamin Mountfort, William Armson and Robert Lawson. Although Farr was a Deacon of the Trinity Congregational Church and had designed the first church, the design of Mountfort was chosen, who was a devout Anglican. Farr's name is listed on the foundation stone as the church's Deacon.

Mountfort was given the requirement of an open preaching space, which he met by choosing an Early French rather than a High Gothic Revival style. For this reason, the church has a large gallery at the northern end, so that the minister could be seen by all attending a service. Stylistically, the church shares many design elements with Canterbury Museum, which was also Mountfort's work and which was built in stages starting in 1870.

=== Pacific Islanders' Congregational Church ===
The church began to be also used by the Pacific Islanders' Congregational Church in the 1960s, and the congregations formally merged in 1968. In 1969, the Congregational church and the Presbyterian church combined throughout New Zealand as part of a worldwide trend under the auspices of the World Alliance of Reformed Churches. In Christchurch, the Trinity-Pacific Congregational Church joined with the Presbyterian congregation of St Paul's Church in Cashel Street.

=== State Trinity Centre ===
Financial pressure led to the sale of Trinity Congregational Church in 1974 to State Insurance, who owned the building immediately to the west of the church. The insurance called the building the State Trinity Centre.

The renamed State Trinity Centre was used as a performing arts centre for the community. The new owners undertook significant earthquake strengthening, with the walls internally extended by adding a layer of reinforced concrete. Consent to have the tower earthquake strengthened was declined by the Historic Places Trust, as it was necessary to temporarily remove the tower's roof. The modified building opened to the public on 22 November 1975. For years, Christchurch pupils would sit their piano exams at Trinity. Ownership later changed to private individuals and the building was used as a wedding chapel for Japanese tourists who wanted to get married in Christchurch.

=== The Octagon ===
Alan Slade bought the building in 1993 while on holiday in Christchurch. The owner of a wedding business in Australia already owned several churches, but he was awed by the internal beauty of the Trinity Congregational Church, especially the timber ceiling. His wife described the spontaneous purchase as one undertaken "by a guy with a big heart and very little brain". Restoration work took 13 years in total and in 2006, they opened the restaurant. It was both a restaurant and a training venue for music students. The students worked at the restaurant, trained in music during times the restaurant was closed, and performed for the diners while the restaurant was open. The restaurant's name, The Octagon, makes reference to the octagonal floor plan of the church.

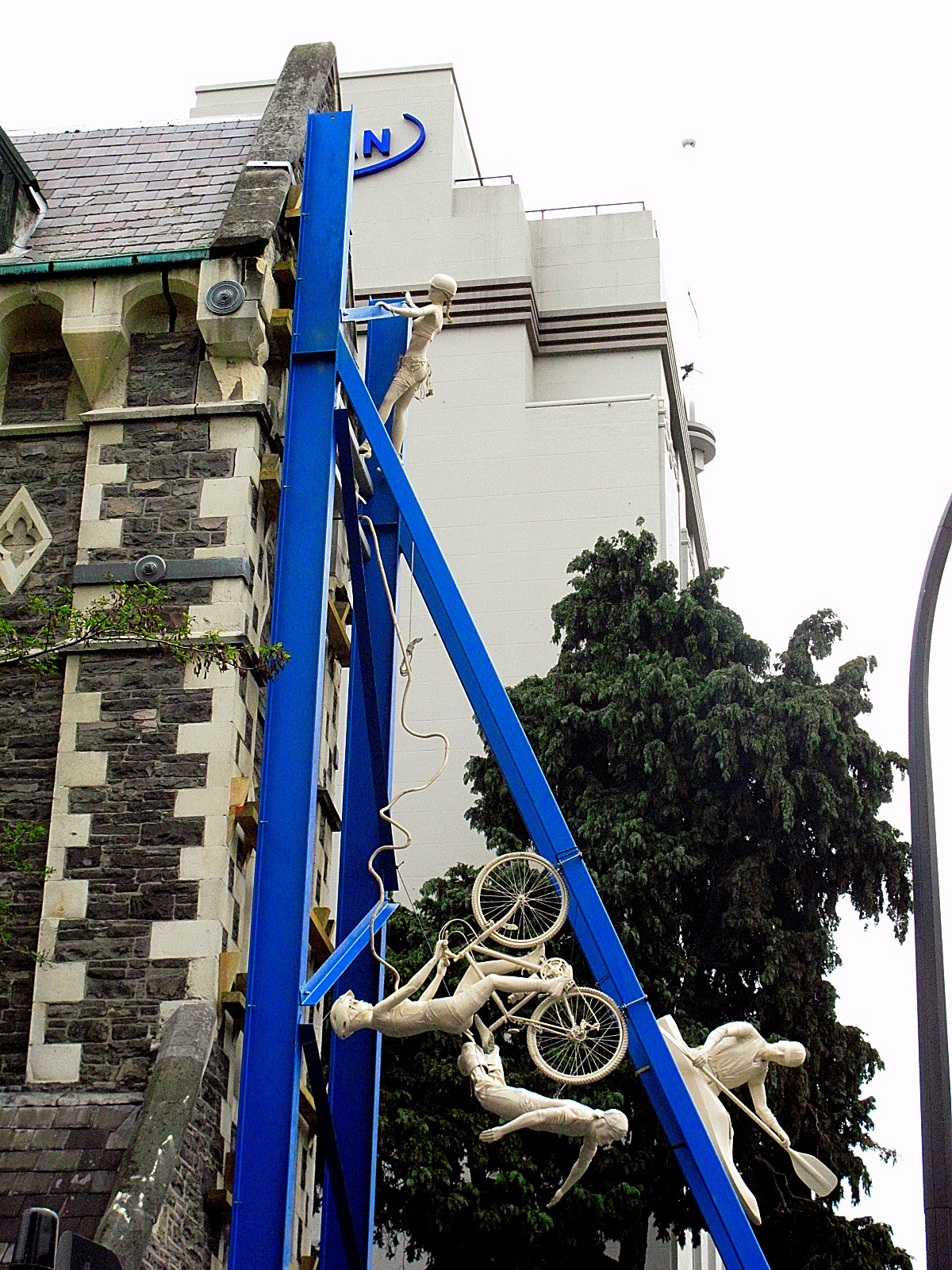
The church tower with bracing after the September 2010 Canterbury earthquake

The former church was damaged in 4 September 2010 Canterbury earthquake and the tower braced with an external steel structure; it was a much photographed item for its decoration with mannequins. Within two months, the restaurant was operating again. The building suffered further damage by the strong aftershock on Boxing Day of that year that was centred underneath the central city. Within two days, the restaurant opened again.

In the 22 February 2011 Christchurch earthquake, the tower collapsed. The engineer who had designed the 1975–76 strengthening work had only recently warned that the tower was "severely compromised". Slade blamed that the consenting authorities, the Christchurch City Council and the New Zealand Historic Places Trust, were responsible for much of the loss of Christchurch's historic buildings due to their bureaucratic attitudes, which prevented much earthquake strengthening work from going ahead due to it being too intrusive. Slade, who had spent NZ$500,000 on remedial work prior to the February earthquake, had run out of funds and had reluctantly applied for the building to be demolished.

In June 2012, it was announced that the building was saved, repaired and earthquake strengthened. In the 2012 Canterbury Heritage Awards, the building won the Heritage Retention Award, and the Supreme Award. In March 2013, Christchurch City Council's community, recreation and culture committee voted to give NZ$1 million towards the restoration and strengthening costs.

== Architecture ==
Mountfort had designed other stone churches previously, but Trinity Congregational was the first to be built. Stone rubble walls are contrasted with Oamaru stone, which results in a striking juxtaposition of building materials, with most visual impact on the saddleback tower.

The floor plan of the church is octagonal. The timber roof structure is a double barrel vault, which is regarded as an elegant solution to roofing over such a floor plan. The overall appearance of the building is in the Gothic Revival style.

== Heritage registration ==
The building was registered as a heritage building by Heritage New Zealand on 2 April 1985 with registration number 306 classified as B. With the change of the classification system, the building later became a Category I listing.

== See also ==
- List of oldest buildings in Christchurch
- List of restaurants in New Zealand
