= Christchurch West High School =

New Zealand school (1858–1966)

Coordinates: 43°32′15.24″S 172°37′24.43″E

- Christchurch; New Zealand

Information
- Type: High School

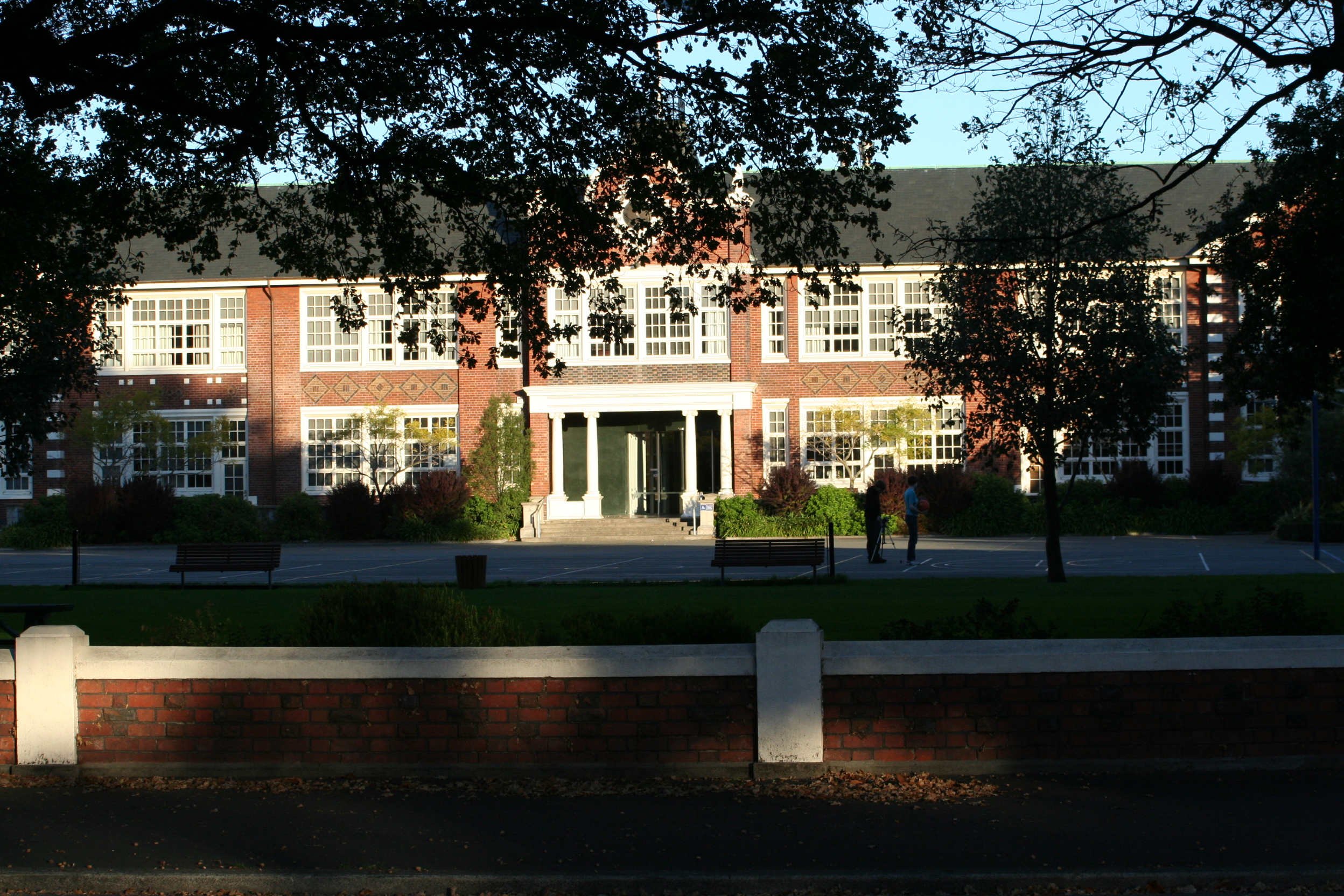
Hagley Community College in 2008

Christchurch West High School (originally Christchurch Academy then High School of Christchurch and then West Christchurch Borough School) existed prior to 1966 on the site of Hagley College in Hagley Avenue, in Christchurch, New Zealand. In that year 'West' amalgamated with Technical High School to become Hagley High School. As part of that amalgamation, the maroon, black and white colours were changed to teal.

== History ==
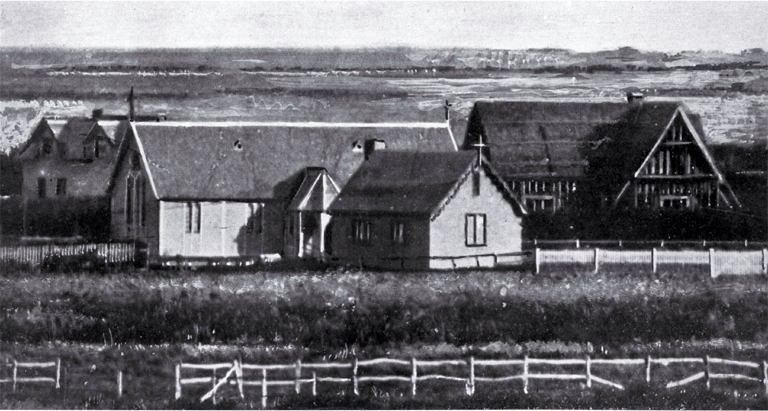
St. Andrew's Presbyterian Church and The Academy in 1858 at Hospital corner; the church was later relocated to Rangi Ruru Girls' School

The school was opened on 15 November 1858 by the St. Andrew's Presbyterian Church on their triangular site formed by Tuam Street, Antigua Street, and Oxford Terrace. The original name was Christchurch Academy and the school enjoyed a good reputation. The school committee that ran the school decided in 1863 that a bigger site was needed and they purchased the current school grounds opposite South Hagley Park some 400 yards (370 m) from their original site. The name changed to High School of Christchurch when the school relocated in July 1863.

A main source of income for early Christchurch schools was an annual grant by the Canterbury Provincial Council, with funds distributed to school committees in proportion of the denomination of the population. The educational system changed in 1873 and the province discontinued its grants. Reluctantly, the school committee decided to offer the school buildings and grounds to the newly established West Christchurch educational committee. The chairman of the West Christchurch educational committee, Henry Tancred, sanctioned the purchase in September 1873. The school was renamed West Christchurch Borough School and it became public that year; 70 existing pupils transferred to the new school. The roll greatly increased and by the end of 1877, there were 868 pupils.

== Heritage registration ==
The main school building, built in 1924, is registered by Heritage New Zealand as a Category II heritage structure with registration number 1874. It was originally called the West Christchurch Public School. A centenary book was published in 1958.

== Notable staff ==
- Tony Foster (1853–1918), headmaster from 1882 until ca 1904
- William Habens (1839–1899), on the staff from 1868

== Notable alumni ==
- Derek Arnold (born 1941), All Blacks player
- William Baverstock (1883–1975), first director of the Christchurch Art Gallery
- Sir Frank Callaway (1919–2003), influential music educator and administrator in Perth, Western Australia
- Ben Couch (1925–1996), All Black (1947–49), Member of Parliament for Wairarapa and Minister of Māori Affairs (1978–84)
- Colleen Dewe (1930–1993), National MP for Lyttelton (1975–1978)
- Maurice Dixon (1929–2004), All Black (1953–57)
- Pauline Gardiner (born 1947), former member of parliament
- Sydney Josland (1904–1991), bacteriologist
- Tommy Taylor (1862–1911), former Christchurch Mayor, New Zealand Member of Parliament, businessman and prohibitionist (advocate of temperance)
- Ada Wells (1863–1933), suffragette
- Owen Wilkes (1940–2005), peace campaigner
- Cecil Wood (1878–1947), architect
- Denis Young (1930–2020), All Black (1956–64)
