= Wellington Writers Walk =

Walk touring a series of 23 sculptures of quotations from New Zealand writers

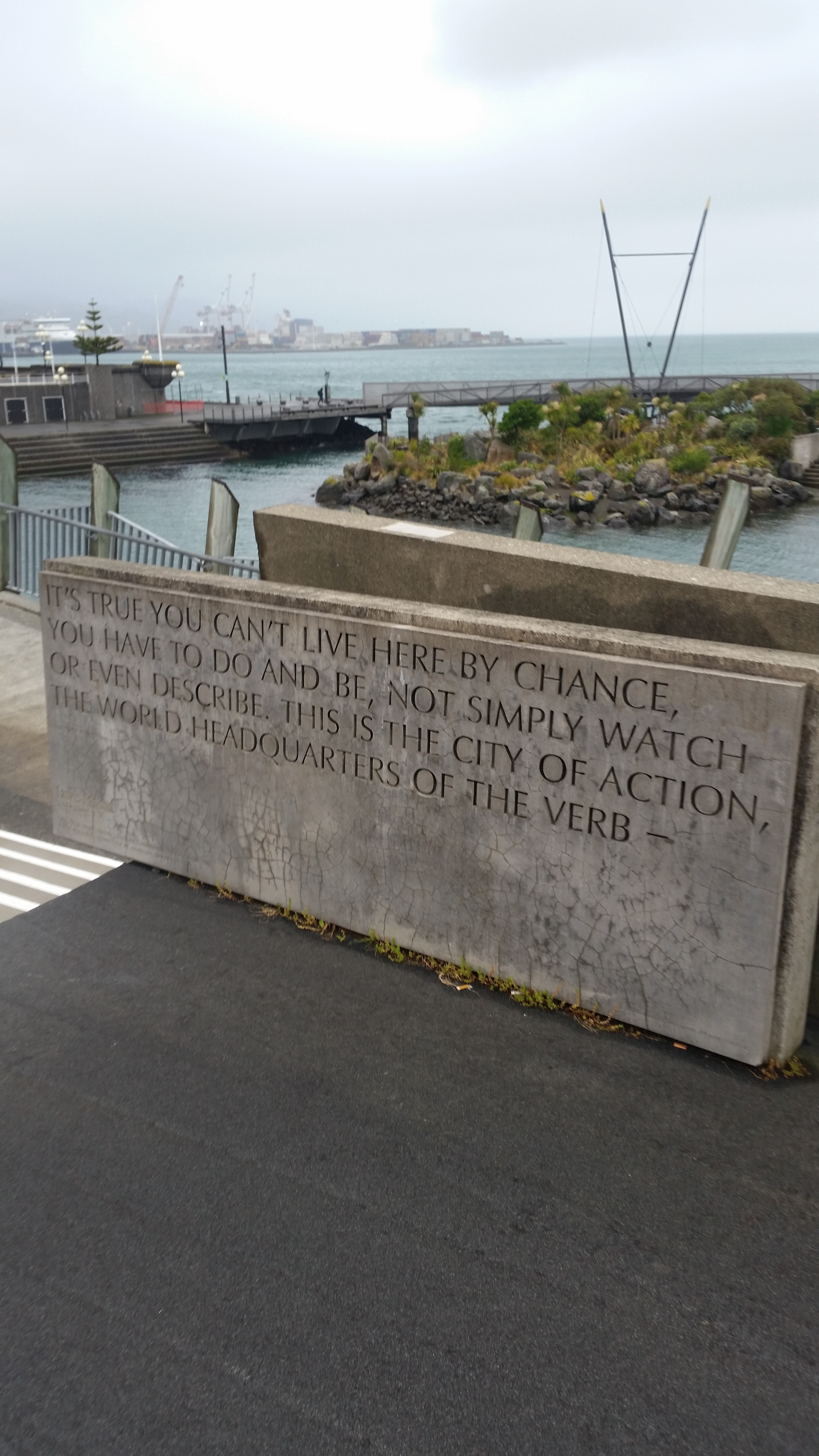

The Wellington Writers Walk is made up of a series of 24 quotations from New Zealand writers, including poets, novelists, and playwrights. The quotations are placed along the Wellington waterfront, from Kumutoto Stream to Oriental Bay, and were installed to honour and celebrate the lives and works of the writers, all of whom had (or have) some connection to Wellington. The sculptures take several different forms: contemporary concrete plaques, designed by Catherine Griffiths; inlaid metal text on wooden 'benchmarks', designed by Fiona Christeller, and the most recent sculpture, with a backlit metal plaque sitting on a patterned concrete cylindrical base, designed by David Hakaraia.

== History ==
The Wellington Writers Walk began as a project of the Wellington Branch of the New Zealand Society of Authors (PEN NZ Inc.) Te Puni Kaituhi o Aotearoa under the inaugural committee of Eirlys Hunter (convenor), Robin Fleming, Dame Fiona Kidman, Barbara Murison, Ann Packer, Susan Pearce, Judy Siers and Joy Tonks. The committee later comprised Rosemary Wildblood (convenor), Robyn Cooper, Sarah Gaitanos, Michael Keith and Barbara Murison.

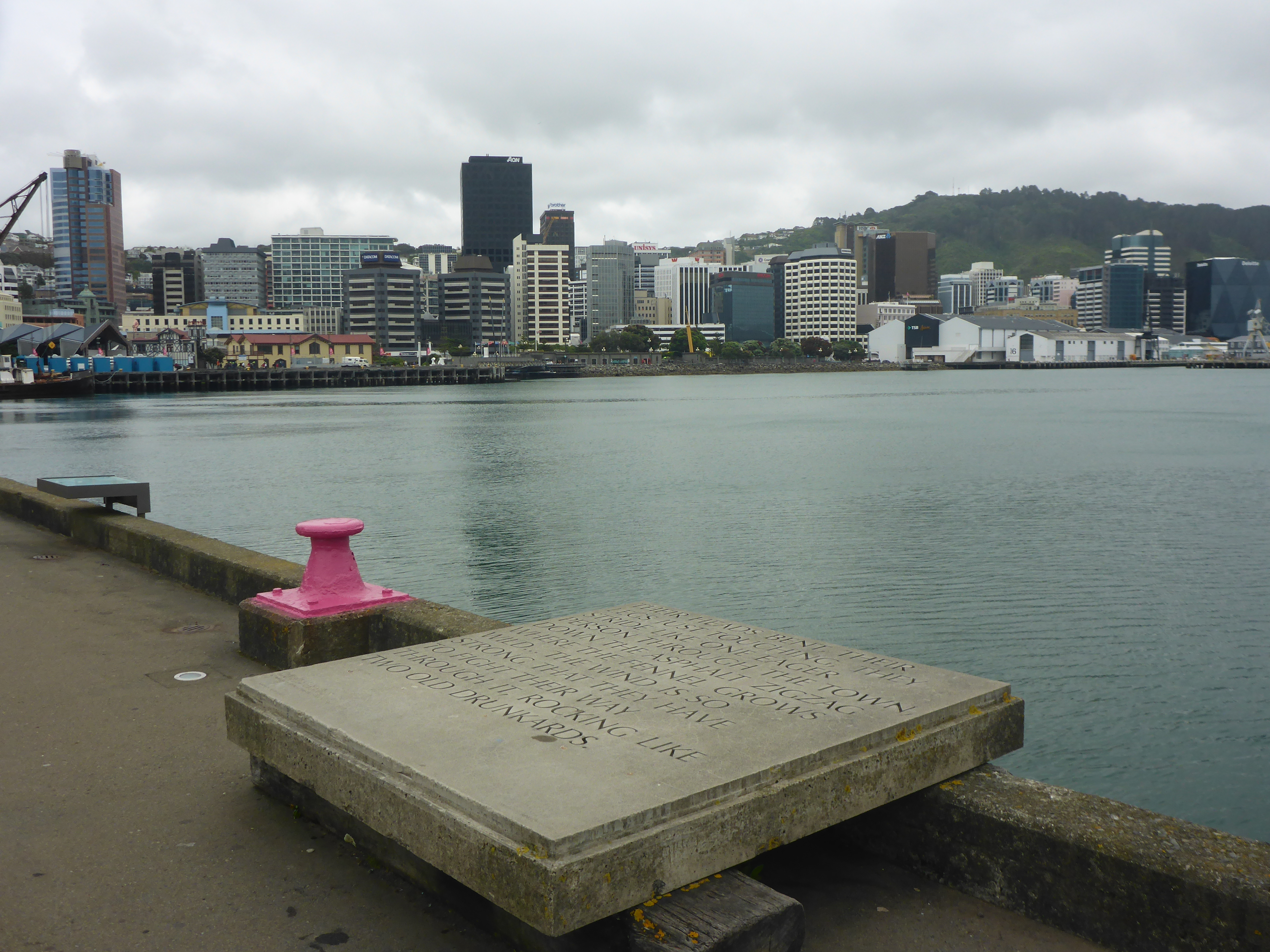

The first series of 11 concrete plaques were designed by internationally renowned typographer Catherine Griffiths, with each plaque having an individual sponsor. The Writers Walk was opened during New Zealand Post Writers and Readers Week, part of the International Festival of the Arts, on 11 March 2002. Stage Two of the Walk was launched on 8 May 2004. Catherine Griffiths was awarded the Terry Stringer Award at the BEST Design Awards in 2002 for her work on the sculptures.

The quotations for Jack Lasenby, Joy Cowley, James McNeish and Elizabeth Knox were unveiled by the then patron, Governor-General Sir Jerry Mateparae, in a ceremony on the waterfront on 20 March 2013. These were designed by award-winning Wellington architect Fiona Christeller.

The most recent sculpture, and the first in te reo Māori, was unveiled on 25 June 2026. It features the text “He Karakia mō Puanga mā Matariki”, composed by Ben Ngaia (Te Āti Awa), and was designed by David Hakaraia (Ngāpuhi, Ngāti Paoa) with landscape design by Tama Whiting (Te Whānau-ā-Apanui).

The Writers Walk attracts a lot of attention from locals as well as visitors, tourists, bloggers and photographers, and is also a popular expedition for school groups.

Past Patrons of the Wellington Writers Walk have included Dame Silvia Cartwright, Sir Anand Satyanand, Sir Jerry Mateparae and Lady Janine Mateparae and Dame Patsy Reddy.

== Events ==
In 2008, the Wellington Writers Walk committee held the Wellington Sonnet Competition, sponsored by New Zealand Post, which attracted over 200 entries. The competition was judged by Harry Ricketts and won by Michele Amas, with Saradha Koirala and Richard Reeve in second and third place respectively.

In 2012, New Zealand was Guest of Honour at the Frankfurt Book Fair, and the Wellington Writers Walk played a starring role, with large decals of the quotations appearing alongside the River Main in Frankfurt. It was launched there in September 2012 by New Zealand writers Hamish Clayton and Tina Makereti, both in residence at Frankfurt's Weltkulturen Museum.

The Writers Walk featured in a 2015 Spectrum documentary when presenter Jack Perkins explored part of the walk with Rosemary Wildblood, Barbara Murison and Philippa Werry.

In 2017, a project for the Wai-Te-Ata Press at Victoria University of Wellington, called the Literary Atlas of Wellington, was undertaken to create an augmented reality mobile application based on the Wellington Writers Walk.

== List ==
Plaque	Writer	Dates	Quotation	Source	Location
	Elizabeth Knox	b. 1959	The evening light concentrated, till the city and the topped-up trembling horizon beyond Pencarrow Head would begin to look like a seaport in someone's lost paradise.	From 'Provenance' in The Love School (Victoria University Press, 2008)	https://www.google.com/maps/place/Wellington+Writer's+Walk+%231/@-41.2828242,174.7782602,18z/data=!3m1!4b1!4m5!3m4!1s0x6d38af4843440b07:0xe2c62ecfc5693f00!8m2!3d-41.2828256!4d174.779034
	Eileen Duggan	1894-1972	My quiet morning hill Stands like an altar drawn Whereon hushed hands shall lay The shining pyx of dawn. With penitence and stir, And drowsy flurry by, The wind, a shamefaced serving-boy Comes running up the sky.	'The Acolyte' in Selected Poems: Eileen Duggan, ed. Peter Whiteford (Victoria University Press, 1994)	https://www.google.com/maps/place/Wellington+Writer's+Walk+%232/@-41.2839725,174.7780358,18z/data=!3m1!4b1!4m5!3m4!1s0x6d38afe4ff57ea8d:0x6733410e451a82c5!8m2!3d-41.2839725!4d174.7791301
	Denis Glover	1912-1980	The harbour is an ironing board; Flat iron tugs dash smoothing toward Any shirt of a ship, any pillowslip Of a freighter they decree Must be ironed flat as washing from the sea.	From 'Wellington Harbour is a Laundry' in Come High Water (Dunmore Press, 1977)	https://www.google.com/maps/place/Wellington+Writer's+Walk+%233/@-41.2872816,174.7772092,17z/data=!3m1!4b1!4m5!3m4!1s0x6d38afb69d22f1ef:0x8ee95667be0ad78f!8m2!3d-41.2872857!4d174.7793979
	Michael King	1945-2004	I baited my line, watched it sink, and waited with exquisite anticipation for the pecking of mullet, the sucking of trevally, or - best of all - the sudden pull of kahawai or kingfish.	From Being Pakeha Now (Penguin Books, 1999)	https://www.google.com/maps/search/Wellington+Writer's+Walk+%234/@-41.2872735,174.7772092,17z/data=!3m1!4b1
	Louis Johnson	1924-1988	From Brooklyn hill, ours is a doll-size city A formal structure of handpicked squares and bricks Apprehensible as a child’s construction Signifying community.	From 'Last View of Wellington' in Fires and Patterns (The Jacaranda Press, 1975)	https://www.google.com/maps/place/Wellington+Writer's+Walk+%235/@-41.2879898,174.7772166,17z/data=!3m1!4b1!4m5!3m4!1s0x6d38af241aa73ceb:0x203f65349b01e111!8m2!3d-41.2879939!4d174.7794053
	Pat Lawlor	1893- 1979	And now, as I grow in years, I feel at times like an old violin played on by a master hand. You, dear city, are the maestro drawing the bow over the sensibilities of my mind, echoing the music of my days.	From Old Wellington Days (Whitcombe & Tombs, 1959)	https://www.google.com/maps/search/Wellington+Writer's+Walk+%236/@-41.2879817,174.7772166,17z/data=!3m1!4b1
	Lauris Edmond	1924-2000	It’s true you can’t live here by chance, you have to do and be, not simply watch or even describe. This is the city of action, the world headquarters of the verb –	From 'The Active Voice' in Scenes from a Small City (Daphne Brasell Associates Press, 1994)	https://www.google.com/maps/search/Wellington+Writer's+Walk+%237/@-41.2879736,174.7772166,17z/data=!3m1!4b1
	Vincent O'Sullivan	b. 1937	Then it’s Wellington we’re coming to! It’s time, she says, it’s time surely for us to change lanes, change tongues, they speak so differently down here.	From 'Driving South with Lucy to the Big Blue Hills' in Seeing You Asked (Victoria University Press, 1998)	https://www.google.com/maps/@-41.2888522,174.7787781,3a,90y,296.49h,86.07t/data=!3m6!1e1!3m4!1sJJEEaRy_gnvrLbvg9ycqKQ!2e0!7i13312!8i6656
The quotation for Maurice Gee on the Wellington Writers Walk	Maurice Gee	b. 1931	Then out of the tunnel and Wellington burst like a bomb. It opened like a flower, was lit up like a room, explained itself exactly, became the capital.	From Going West (Faber and Faber, 1992)	https://www.google.com/maps/place/Wellington+Writer's+Walk+%239/@-41.2876527,174.7747313,16z/data=!4m5!3m4!1s0x6d38af14faec583b:0x8f95516b4fc31200!8m2!3d-41.288232!4d174.7795063
	Patricia Grace	b. 1937	I love this city, the hills, the harbour, the wind that blasts through it. I love the life and pulse and activity, and the warm decrepitude ... there’s always an edge here that one must walk which is sharp and precarious, requiring vigilance.	From Cousins (Penguin Books, 1992)	https://www.google.com/maps/place/Wellington+Writer's+Walk+%2310/@-41.2886204,174.7777457,17z/data=!3m1!4b1!4m5!3m4!1s0x6d38afe3b907f2ed:0xa3f45f618b0a8b35!8m2!3d-41.2886245!4d174.7799344
	Jack Lasenby	1931-2019	I want to live among people who believe in truth and freedom...I want to discuss ideas... I want books...	From The Conjurer (Oxford University Press, 1992)	https://www.google.com/maps/place/Wellington+Writer's+Walk+%2311/@-41.2896156,174.7777925,17z/data=!3m1!4b1!4m5!3m4!1s0x0:0xafaefeb47a23c55b!8m2!3d-41.2896197!4d174.7799812
	Bill Manhire	b. 1946	I live at the edge of the universe, like everybody else.	From 'Milky Way Bar' in Milky Way Bar (Victoria University Press, 1991)	https://www.google.com/maps/@-41.2896284,174.7806273,3a,15y,243.93h,61.7t/data=!3m7!1e1!3m5!1sn_NVtqibXKt9jVTW1YSDcQ!2e0!6shttps:%2F%2Fstreetviewpixels-pa.googleapis.com%2Fv1%2Fthumbnail%3Fpanoid%3Dn_NVtqibXKt9jVTW1YSDcQ%26cb_client%3Dsearch.revgeo_and_fetch.gps%26w%3D96%26h%3D64%26yaw%3D175.58965%26pitch%3D0%26thumbfov%3D100!7i13312!8i6656
	Sam Hunt	b. 1946	Tall buildings no bigger than blocks on the floor, Wellington afloat on the harbour haze ... You think of how most men spend their days In offices as cramped as elevators –	From 'Letter to Jerusalem 2' in Collected Poems 1963 - 1980 (Penguin Books, 1980)	No good quality Google Maps link. Imagine this artwork is Just to the left, across the "diving board" from the previous (Bill Manhire) link.
	Bruce Mason	1921-1982	I ask that not only my city, but all, give themselves to the essence of our cult – the ritual assembly of an interested coterie in a space where magic can be made and miracles occur.	From Theatre in 1981: Omens and Portents unpublished ms, Bruce Mason papers, JC Beaglehole Room, Victoria University of Wellington	In front of Circa Theatre, near Te Papa https://www.google.com/maps/@-41.2901499,174.7808488,3a,74.7y,243.82h,86.03t/data=!3m6!1e1!3m4!1s8J9u6MB_SmkgNuLmaCk5vQ!2e0!7i13312!8i6656
	Alistair Te Ariki Campbell	1925-2009	Blue rain from a clear sky. Our world a cube of sunlight – but to the south the violet admonition of thunder.	From 'Blue Rain' in The Dark Lord of Savaiki: Collected Poems (Hazard Press, 2003)	https://www.google.com/maps/@-41.289743,174.7806881,3a,52.3y,157.13h,79.78t/data=!3m6!1e1!3m4!1sMLIVNkRpOk9ecEpXdW0Mxg!2e0!7i13312!8i6656
	Ben Ngaia	1977–	He Karakia mō Puanga mā Matarikii	Text was gifted to Wellington Writers Walk by Te Wharewaka o Pōneke	
The quotation for Robin Hyde on the Wellington Writers Walk	Robin Hyde	1906-1939	Yet I think, having used my words as the kings used gold, Ere we came by the rustling jest of the paper kings, I who am overbold will be steadily bold, In the counted tale of things.	From 'Words' in Young Knowledge: The Poems of Robin Hyde, ed. Michele Leggott (Auckland University Press, 2003)	https://www.google.com/maps/@-41.2896105,174.7814115,3a,15.1y,188.51h,86.62t/data=!3m6!1e1!3m4!1sFQEnTAbixV7aMAv10jKy8Q!2e0!7i13312!8i6656
The quotation for James K. Baxter on the Wellington Writers Walk	James K. Baxter	1926-1972	I saw the Maori Jesus walking on Wellington Harbour. He wore blue dungarees. His beard and hair were long. His breath smelt of mussels and paraoa. When he smiled it looked like the dawn.	From 'The Maori Jesus' in Collected Poems of James K Baxter, ed. J E Weir (Oxford University Press, 2003)	https://www.google.com/maps/@-41.2894922,174.7825234,3a,40.9y,216.75h,96.06t/data=!3m6!1e1!3m4!1sE78bVHG9-vzIABFIbMRo-g!2e0!7i13312!8i6656
	Katherine Mansfield	1888-1923	Their heads bent, their legs just touching, they stride like one eager person through the town, down the asphalt zigzag where the fennel grows wild ... the wind is so strong that they have to fight their way through it, rocking like two old drunkards.	From 'The Wind Blows' in Bliss and Other Stories (Penguin Books, 2001)	https://www.google.com/maps/place/Wellington+Writer's+Walk+%2318/@-41.2886123,174.7777457,17z/data=!4m5!3m4!1s0x6d38af3df6c6e91d:0xbcbc0b2e372e1649!8m2!3d-41.2893614!4d174.7830566 https://www.google.com/maps/@-41.289475,174.7830662,3a,15.3y,4.59h,83.61t/data=!3m6!1e1!3m4!1swNW92B2EHJc_Y5HLwAtDLw!2e0!7i13312!8i6656 (Image)
	Joy Cowley	b. 1936	Light dances on hills and office windows and shakes its skirts over the harbour in a wild fandango that attracts the pale moths of yachts in droves	From the poem 'After the Southerly' in Writing from the Heart (Storylines, 2010)	
	James McNeish	1931-2016	A ruffian wind is bliss, a blind man's comfort station. When I get tired of walking around it, I can always lean against it.	From The Crime of Huey Dunstan (Random House, 2010)	https://www.google.com/maps/place/Wellington+Writer's+Walk+%2320/@-41.2896075,174.7777925,17z/data=!4m5!3m4!1s0x6d38af6b529c7cbd:0xf231f95664c08acd!8m2!3d-41.2905541!4d174.7839984 https://www.google.com/maps/@-41.2905919,174.7839315,3a,16.9y,58.69h,72.06t/data=!3m6!1e1!3m4!1sNIgJtDkQm_lkuShXQMfkSg!2e0!7i13312!8i6656 (Image - look closely)
	Marilyn Duckworth	b. 1935	Then with the coming of darkness the bay opened up beneath us, like a shell splashed with beads of light.	From A Barbarous Tongue (Hutchinson, 1963)	https://www.google.com/maps/@-41.2905718,174.7842898,3a,42.8y,2.21h,84.91t/data=!3m6!1e1!3m4!1sxfvrnXGVfFZWE-yAA0KPaA!2e0!7i13312!8i6656
	Fiona Kidman	b. 1940	This town of ours kind of flattened across the creases of an imaginary map a touch of parchment surrealism here no wonder the lights are wavering all over the place tonight not a straight town at all	From 'Speaking with my Grandmothers' in Writing Wellington, ed. Roger Robinson (Victoria University Press, 1999)	https://www.google.com/maps/place/Wellington+Writer's+Walk+%2322/@-41.2900549,174.7877836,17z/data=!3m1!4b1!4m5!3m4!1s0x6d38afe8d6844ea9:0xaad9489e13827508!8m2!3d-41.290059!4d174.7899723
	Barbara Anderson	1926-2013	Everything about it was good. The tugging wind trapped and cornered by buildings, steep short cuts bordered by Garden Escapes, precipitous gullies where throttling green creepers blanketed the trees beneath.	From 'The Girls' in I Think We Should Go into the Jungle (Victoria University Press, 1989)	https://www.google.com/maps/place/Wellington+Writer's+Walk+%2323/@-41.2886026,174.7974058,17z/data=!4m5!3m4!1s0x6d38af5987632455:0xb2bd5bb1d154048d!8m2!3d-41.2886026!4d174.7995945 https://www.google.com/maps/@-41.2882879,174.799433,3a,15y,163.75h,89.91t/data=!3m7!1e1!3m5!1s0u-42KPG1sflx37yBp5QNQ!2e0!6shttps:%2F%2Fstreetviewpixels-pa.googleapis.com%2Fv1%2Fthumbnail%3Fpanoid%3D0u-42KPG1sflx37yBp5QNQ%26cb_client%3Dsearch.revgeo_and_fetch.gps%26w%3D96%26h%3D64%26yaw%3D233.577%26pitch%3D0%26thumbfov%3D100!7i16384!8i8192 (Image)
