= Terry Locke =

New Zealand poet, anthologist, poetry reviewer and academic

Terry James Locke (born 1946) is a New Zealand poet, anthologist, poetry reviewer and academic.

== Background ==
Terry Locke was born in Auckland and grew up in the suburb of Sandringham, the youngest of three children. He attended St Peter's College where he was in the same class as Sam Hunt and was taught "for two important senior years" by K O Arvidson. He was dux of the college in 1964 and in 1965 was awarded a Junior National University Scholarship. In 1965 Locke attended Holy Name Seminary in Christchurch and then commenced a degree in English and Mathematics at Auckland University, eventually completing a PhD in English. His doctoral thesis, supervised by Wystan Curnow, was on the subject, The Antagonistic City: A Design for Urban Imagery in Seven American Poets. During that time he was also a social activist and was involved in the foundation of Youthline with Father Felix Donnelly. He was the director of Youthline and was involved in other social and Catholic initiatives. He later wrote a history of Youthline.

== Academic ==
While completing his PhD and afterwards, Locke lectured from time to time in the English Department at Auckland University over a period of nine years (1970–76 and 1980–83). He was editor of Rapport for four years.

In 1971-72 he was a visiting research fellow at Yale University while working on his PhD thesis. He also taught at secondary school level for twelve years. From 1997 to 2017 he worked in the Arts and Language Education Department of the School of Education at Waikato University, where he trained secondary English teachers and pursued academic interests in such areas as "professionalism, 'new technologies', the construction of English and educational reform".

Locke retired as professor in 2017 and was appointed emeritus professor: arts and language education

== Poetry ==
As a student at Auckland University Locke associated with other new poets including Ian Wedde. He has stated that his poetic influences include William Wordsworth, T. S. Eliot, William Carlos Williams, Wallace Stevens, Charles Olson, Robert Duncan, Denise Levertov and William Stafford. Emily Dickinson is his favourite poet but he has stated that she has not influenced his poetry. His early poems were published in Landfall and other journals. Some of those were republished in his first book of poems, After a Life in the Provinces, published in 1983.

His home in the old villa in Kingsland provided the setting for his second book of poems, Home Territory (Lindon, 1984). Locke's third book of poems Maketu (concerning Phillip Tapsell) was published in 2003 and his fourth collection, Ranging around the zero, appeared in 2014 and Tending the Landscape of the Heart (2019). Locke edited or co-edited three anthologies of New Zealand poetry

== Collections ==
=== After a Life in the Provinces ===
The poems in Locke's first book of poems are dominated by personal and family concerns (for example, in Child of Mine, Poem for Barry at the Age of Two and Surrogate Lover). This may be compared with the more mature eponymous poem After a Life in the Provinces where Locke interweaves his past, his religious concerns, his relationship with his wife and his domestic setting with reflections on poetry: Unless presently engaged/ poetry must endless grope/towards a past/immediately felt./One perception must lead to another./In that must/is dust transfigured. That poem quotes Walt Whitman from Song of Myself: Having pried through the strata, analysed to a hair,/ counsel'd with doctors and calculated close,/I find no sweeter fat than sticks to my own bones. Locke replies: It's that easy, eh?.

Locke's religious concerns are given more pointed treatment in Church Universal. Another reflection in a domestic setting is in the poem Morning: Grapefruit, Many of the poems have specific New Zealand settings familiar to the poet such as Near the Waiohini River Bridge It Happens and Mangaweka. The poem Demonstration concerns the Saturday, 5 September 1981 Auckland riot during the Sprinboks tour which occurred in the area around Eden Park, Auckland. The poem Reply to Baxter is an attack on some of the social views of James K Baxter expressed in his poem Pig Island Letters (2).

=== Home Territory ===
Locke's second book of poems contains two named poems The Motel (4 parts) and the much longer Home Territory (45 parts). Both poems are largely dominated by family concerns, particularly Locke's relationship with his wife, her pregnancy and the eventual birth of their daughter.

=== Maketu ===
Locke's third book of poems is an extended sequence concerning Phillip Tapsell (also known as "Philip Tapsell"), a figure from early Nineteenth-century New Zealand history "at once romantic, tantalizingly inaccessible and significant" The poems are a record of the process of finding out about Tapsell (speaking with descendants and others, reading documents and their "academic interpretations" and writing letters) and a reconstruction of the life of Tapsell and Hineiturama, Chieftainess of Te Arawa, who became his wife in 1833. The poems are in a variety of styles. Unifying them all is the image of the diving board as metaphor for the invitation to historical engagement.

The poems refer particularly to the Boyd massacre of 1809. Tapsell was involved in the retribution against the Māori iwi concerned, Ngā Puhi, giving rise to the main poems The Ballad of the good ship Boyd, The Retribution and The Shadow, a description of, and reflection on, Tapsell's first marriage, to Maria Ringa, a Ngā Puhi woman (Thomas Kendall married them – but she left Tapsell soon after) and his second marriage, to another Ngā Puhi woman, solemnised by Samuel Marsden, which also ended quickly, with her death. The later experience of Tapsell and Hineiturama (who were formally married by Bishop Pompallier in 1841) is referred to in the poems The Revenger's tragedy and The artefact.

The sequence is referenced to the moment and place (Maketu) where Locke first heard of Tapsell: "The day was fine. The Kaituna River eddied quietly seawards. The old diving board was still. Near the memorial was an old cannon, and attached to the cannon's base was a plaque bearing the name, Philip Tapsell" (hence the poems carrying the unifying themes The cannon, and especially, The diving board). The poems are rich with references as diverse as William Shakespeare, St Januarius, Copernicus and Pocahontas.

== Publications ==
=== Poetry ===
- After a Life in the Provinces: Poems 1975–1982, Auckland West: Lindon 1983.
- Home Territory, Auckland West: Lindon, 1984.
- Maketu, Wellington: HeadworX, 2003.
- Ranging around the zero, Steele Roberts, Wellington, 2016; retrieved 11 August 2016.
- White Feathers: An Anthology of New Zealand and Pacific Island Poetry on the Theme of Peace, Christchurch: Hazard Press, 1991 (with Peter Low and John Winslade).
- Doors: A Contemporary New Zealand Poetry Selection, Hamilton: Leaders Press, 2000.
- Jewels in the Water: Contemporary New Zealand Poetry for Younger Readers, Hamilton: Leaders Press, 2000.

=== General and academic ===
- National Library of New Zealand, catalogue search: Terry Lock, natlib.govt.nz; retrieved 11 August 2016.
- Professor Terry Locke - Selected Bibliography, University of Waikato; retrieved 25 December 2020.
