= Pukerua Bay =

Suburb of Porirua

- Suburb
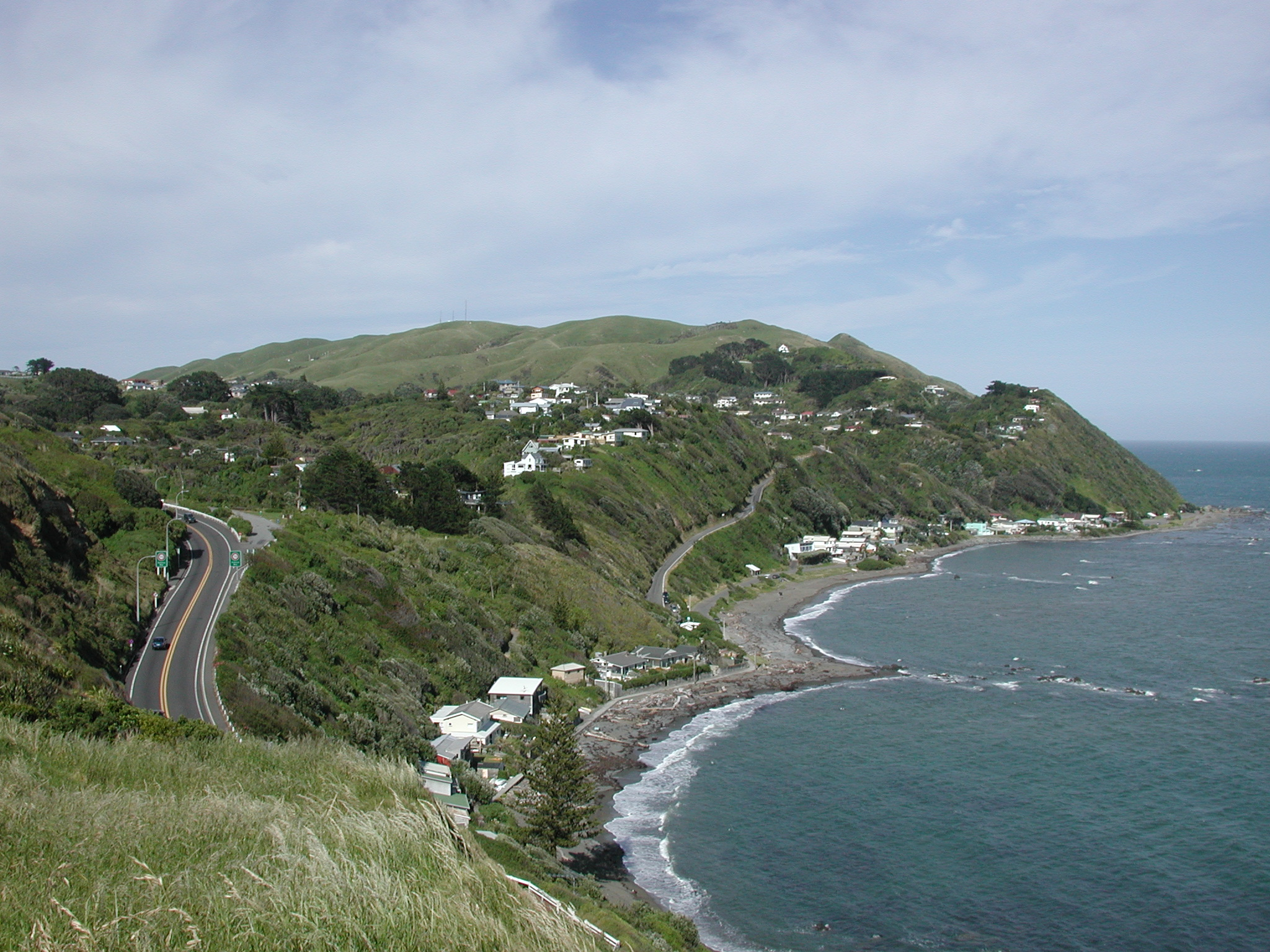
- Pukerua Bay, looking west
- Interactive map of Pukerua Bay
- Coordinates: 41°02′S 174°53′E
- Country: New Zealand
- City: Porirua
- Local authority: Porirua City Council
- Electoral ward: Pāuatahanui General Ward; Porirua Māori Ward

Area
  - Land: 817 ha (2,020 acres)

Population (June 2025)
  - Total: 1,970
  - Density: 241/km^{2} (625/sq mi)
- Train stations: Pukerua Bay railway station; (Muri railway station closed in 2011)

Tasman Sea	Kapiti Island	Paekākāriki
Cook Strait	Pukerua Bay	Paekākāriki Hill
	Plimmerton

Pukerua Bay is a small seaside suburb at the southern end of the Kāpiti Coast, New Zealand. In local government terms it is the northernmost suburb of Porirua City, in the Wellington Region. It is 12 km north of the Porirua City Centre on State Highway 59, and 30 km north of central Wellington. In Māori, the words puke rua literally mean two hills but it is not clear to which hills the name refers.

== Geography ==
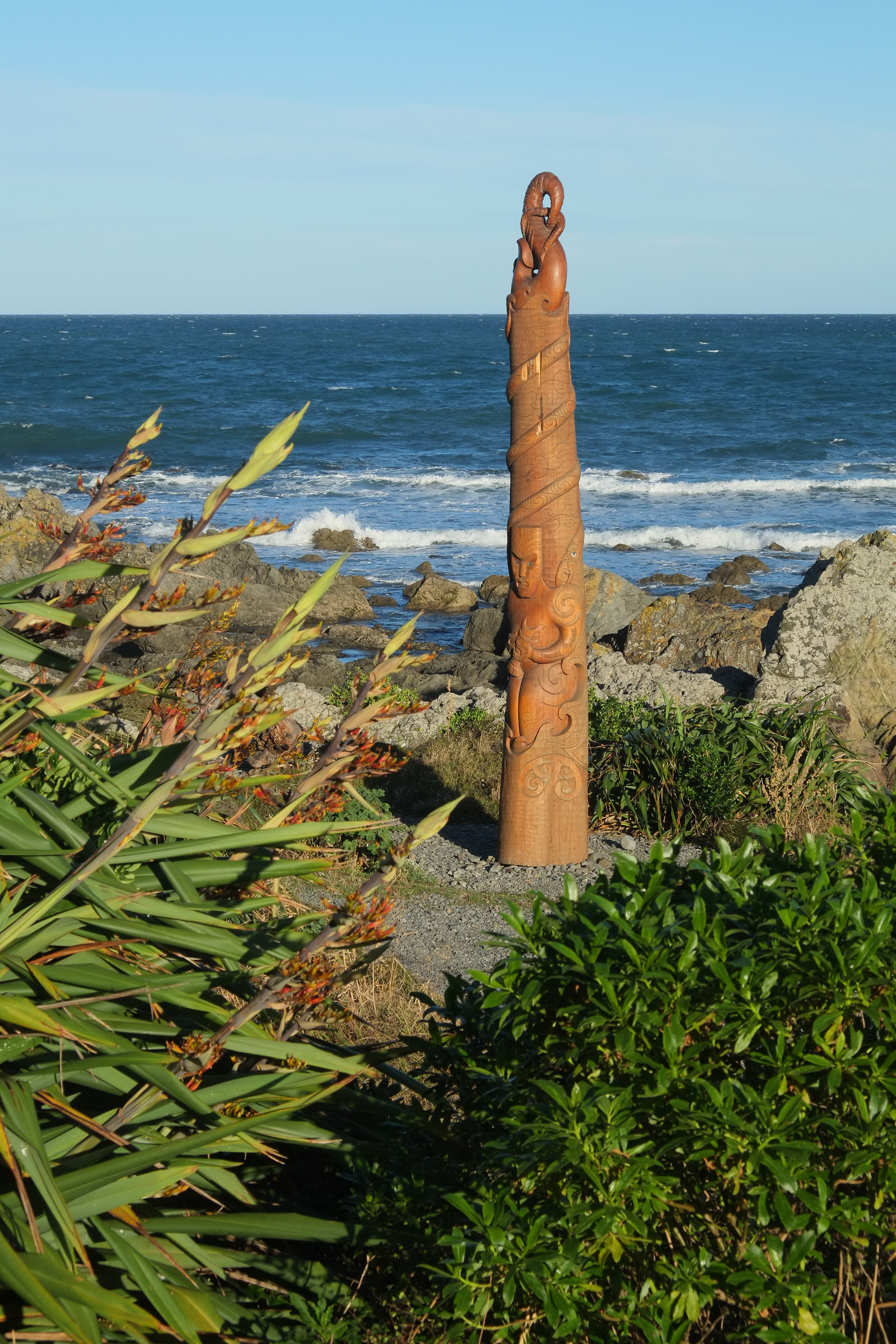
Pou whenua

The majority of Pukerua Bay is situated in a saddle between hills, about 60-90m above sea level, offering sea views (and views of Kapiti Island and occasionally Mounts Taranaki and Ruapehu to the north) from many houses. The Kaikoura range on the South Island including Mt Tapuae-o-Uenuku can be seen from some places at the southern end of the township. The coast around Pukerua Bay is fairly steep, with only a few houses nestled in a row behind the two sandy beach areas. The surrounding hills are mainly farm land used for sheep and cattle grazing, providing a rural backdrop to the east and west. The area to the south, along SH 59, turns into Taupō Swamp towards Plimmerton.

Pukerua Bay's main residential areas are along Rawhiti Road, west of SH 59, the central clifftop, Sea Vista Drive east of SH 59 and the beach frontage extending east (Brendan Beach) and west of Beach Road. There is a pedestrian bridge over SH 59 near Wairaka Road's Kindergarten and pre-school and the school's back entrance (the main entrance is on Rawhiti Road).

There are two walks between Pukerua Bay and Plimmerton (5 km south), one around the rocky coast, and one inland (part of a longer cycleway) parallel to the railway. The inland route is pre-European – it was traditionally known as te taua tapu (the sacred war-party). The cycleway is known as Te Ara Harakeke (the flax road). The coastal route goes past Marble Arch (Te-ana-Puta-o-Hau) to Wairaka Rock on an uninhabited part of Pukerua Bay, was the only mainland home of Whitaker's skink (Oligosoma whitakeri), an icon of the bay. According to legend, the rock is the petrified wife of culture hero Haunui-a-Nanaia, who pursued her from Māhia Peninsula, naming places on the way including Manawatū, Ōhau and Turakina.

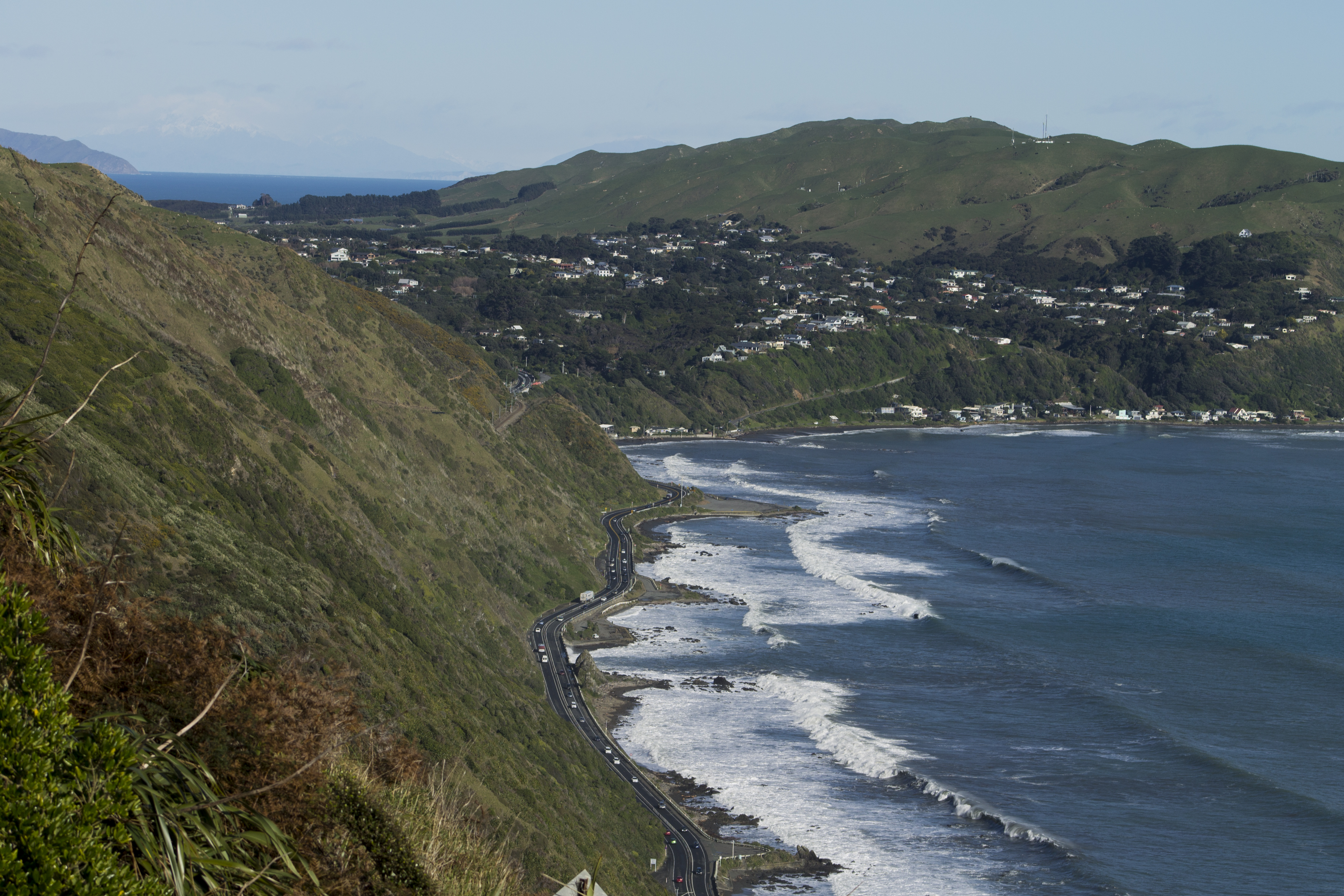
Centennial Highway and Pukerua Bay in 2015

The escarpment track between Pukerua Bay and Paekākāriki is exposed and prone to slips from significant rain events affecting SH 59 north of Pukerua Bay. The coastal road was closed three times within a year in 2022.

The waters around Pukerua Bay, from a point north halfway to Paekākāriki to Wairaka Point south of Pukerua Bay, are currently protected by a rāhui.

== History ==
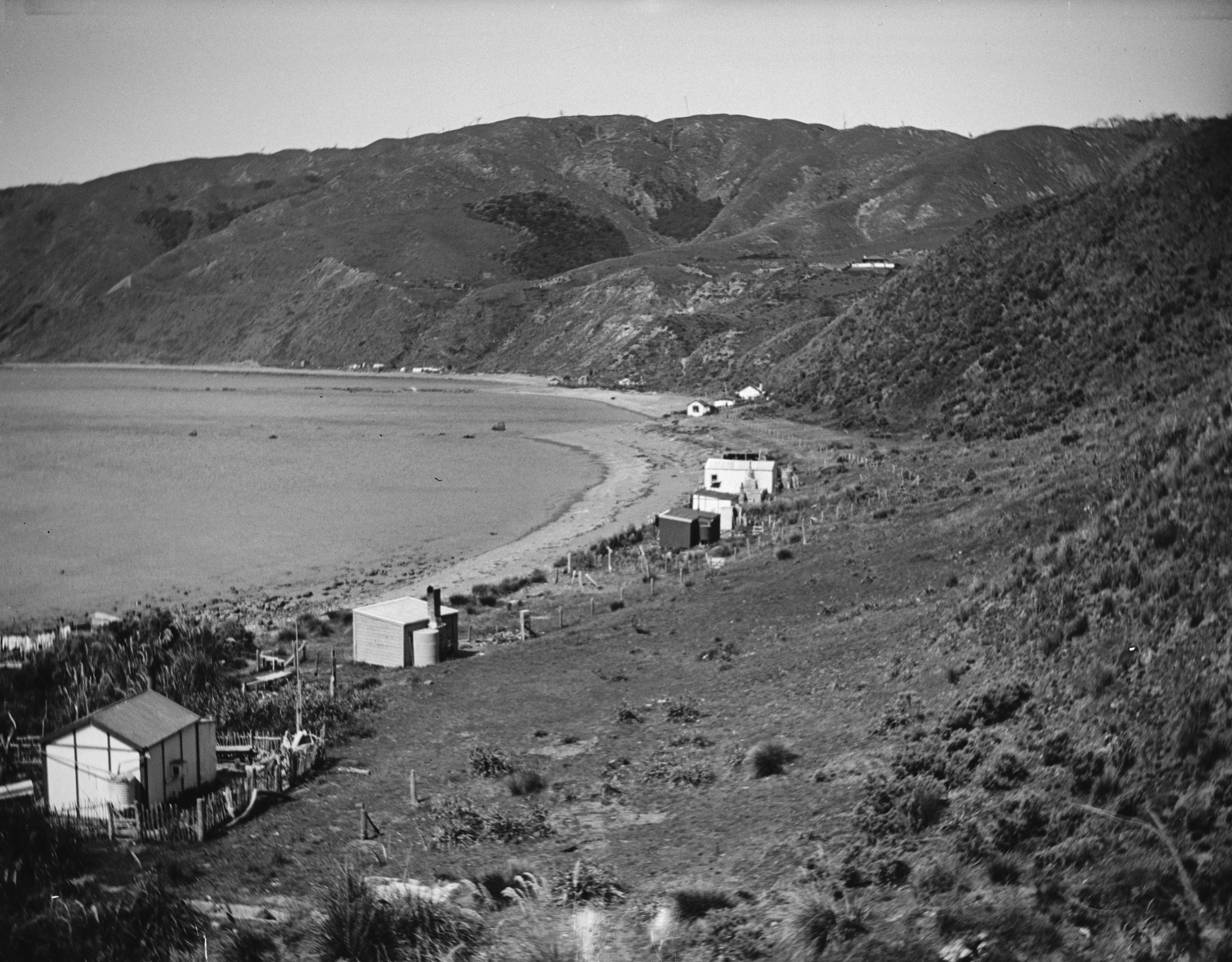
Pukerua Bay beachfront, 11 February 1920, by Leslie Adkin.

The earliest people known to have lived in the area around Pukerua Bay were the Ngāti Ira Māori tribe and later the Muaūpoko, who built Waimapihi Pā near today's seaward end of Rawhiti Road. Pukerua Bay was on the main route for Māori travellers going north or south. About 1822, it was invaded from Kapiti Island by Te Rauparaha and his Ngāti Toa people. According to oral tradition, the Muaūpoko people fled up the gorge of the Waimapihi stream (on the Ohariu Fault line), abandoning their treasures on the way.

The land blocks originally surveyed (Wairaka in the west, Waimapihi and Pukerua in the east) were sold to settlers from Europe for farming in the late 19th century. Charles Gray was the first landowner to subdivide and sell residential sections in Pukerua Bay, in the early 20th century.

Pukerua Bay's development history is curious because the railway went through it (1886) for years before there was good road access (1940), so it grew at first on the waterfront as a weekend destination. The original railway station was named "Pukerua" until it was changed briefly to Waimapihi in the 1920s and then to "Pukerua Bay" to avoid confusion with "Pukerau" in the South Island.

By the end of the 1920s, Pukerua Bay numbered 100 houses, a small school on land donated by Charles Gray, and a few small stores. Electricity was put through from Plimmerton to Pukerua Bay in 1927 and in 1928 the track between Plimmerton and Pukerua Bay was formed into a narrow road. The beach remained the main attraction for weekend visitors from Wellington (by steam train) as there was still no road bridge at Paremata until 1935 and no highway until the Centennial Highway was completed in 1940.

Most of the clifftop development dates from after World War II and Pukerua Bay has its own branch of the Returned Services Association. Pukerua Bay experienced significant growth in the 1950s and 1960s, being connected to Wellington via the Kāpiti Line (which was double-tracked to Pukerua Bay and electrified to Paekakariki in 1940) and accessible from north and south via State Highway 1 (which ran through Pukerua Bay at the time). In 1973, Pukerua Bay joined Porirua City Council to get the issues of water and sewerage connection addressed.

Growth continued in the 1970s with the Sea Vista Drive subdivision and soon the fact that the SH 1 route, with increasing traffic, was going through the middle of Pukerua Bay became an issue. In 1989, an over-bridge over the SH 1 route was opened, after continued lobbying by local residents, which included continually walking across the pedestrian crossing to hold up traffic.

The SH 1 route through Pukerua Bay was renumbered SH 59 on 7 December 2021, due to SH 1 being shifted to the Transmission Gully Motorway.

== Demographics ==
The Pukerua Bay statistical area covers 8.17 km^{2} (3.15 sq mi). It had an estimated population of 1,970 as of June 2025, with a population density of 241 people per km^{2}.

Historical population
Year	Pop.	±% p.a.
2006	1,725	—
2013	1,896	+1.36%
2018	1,962	+0.69%
2023	1,965	+0.03%

Pukerua Bay had a population of 1,965 in the 2023 New Zealand census, an increase of 3 people (0.2%) since the 2018 census, and an increase of 69 people (3.6%) since the 2013 census. There were 948 males, 1,002 females, and 15 people of other genders in 717 dwellings. 4.1% of people identified as LGBTIQ+. The median age was 41.0 years (compared with 38.1 years nationally). There were 426 people (21.7%) aged under 15 years, 261 (13.3%) aged 15 to 29, 984 (50.1%) aged 30 to 64, and 291 (14.8%) aged 65 or older.

People could identify as more than one ethnicity. The results were 90.4% European (Pākehā); 15.0% Māori; 4.0% Pasifika; 3.4% Asian; 1.4% Middle Eastern, Latin American and African New Zealanders (MELAA); and 1.8% other, which includes people giving their ethnicity as "New Zealander". English was spoken by 96.9%, Māori by 4.0%, Samoan by 0.8%, and other languages by 10.4%. No language could be spoken by 2.4% (e.g. too young to talk). New Zealand Sign Language was known by 0.2%. The percentage of people born overseas was 21.8, compared with 28.8% nationally.

Religious affiliations were 26.0% Christian, 0.5% Hindu, 0.2% Islam, 0.8% Māori religious beliefs, 0.6% Buddhist, 0.9% New Age, 0.2% Jewish, and 1.1% other religions. People who answered that they had no religion were 64.4%, and 5.6% of people did not answer the census question.

Of those at least 15 years old, 615 (40.0%) people had a bachelor's or higher degree, 753 (48.9%) had a post-high school certificate or diploma, and 171 (11.1%) people exclusively held high school qualifications. The median income was $57,700, compared with $41,500 nationally. 366 people (23.8%) earned over $100,000 compared to 12.1% nationally. The employment status of those at least 15 was 867 (56.3%) full-time, 255 (16.6%) part-time, and 39 (2.5%) unemployed.

== Features ==
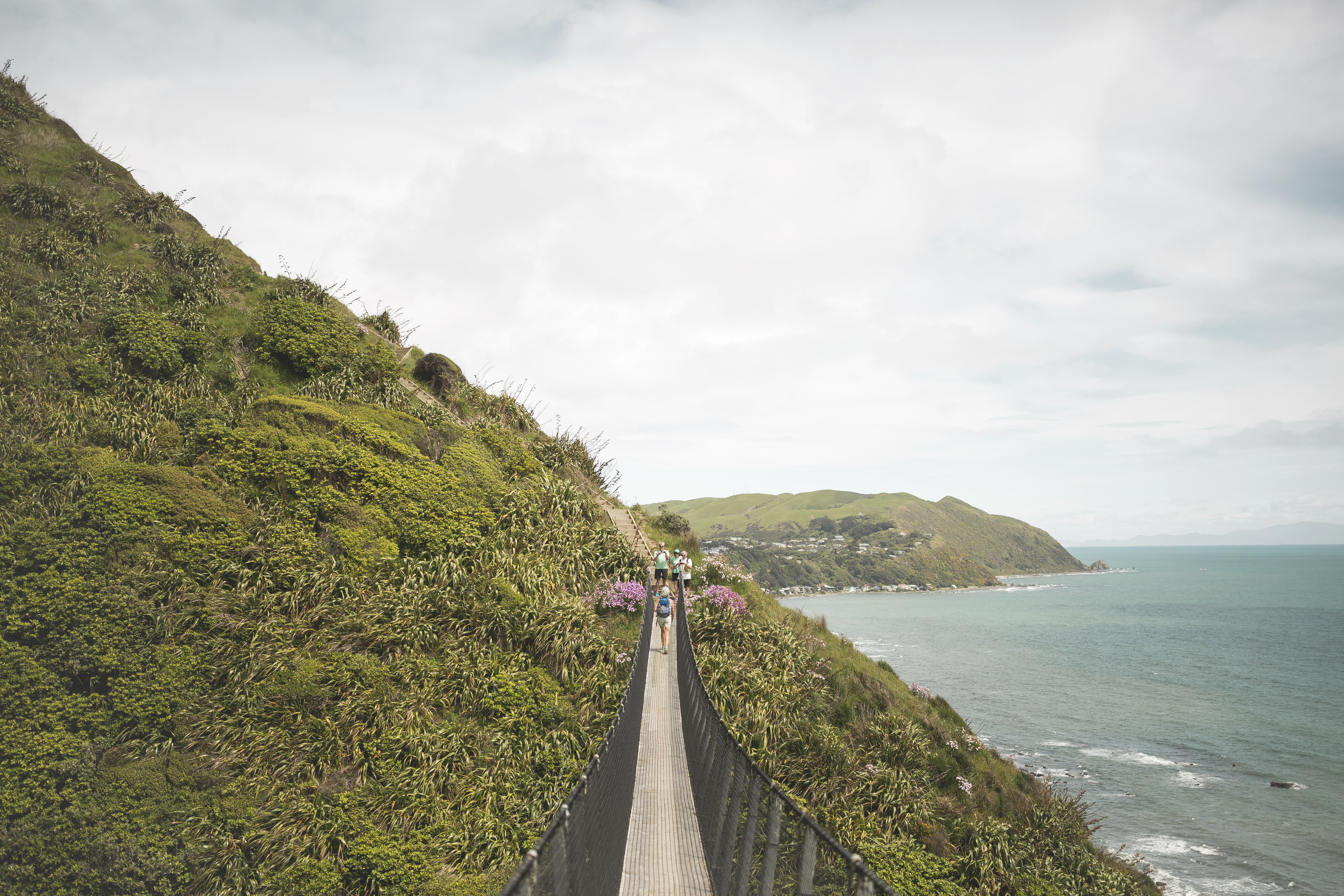
Swing bridge on the Escarpment Track

Pukerua Bay has a branch of Porirua Library, a Returned Servicemen's Association, tennis club, scout hall, sports field, and several nature reserves and trails. Retail facilities include a convenience store, hairdresser and second-hand bookstore. There is one railway station, Pukerua Bay railway station, on the North Island Main Trunk railway, with suburban services provided by Metlink. The train journey to Wellington takes about 35 minutes, to Paraparaumu 20 minutes. A second station, Muri railway station, 1.2 km by road north of Pukerua Bay station, was closed on 30 April 2011.

Pukerua Bay's skatepark was rebuilt in 2009 in a collaborative venture between the Porirua City Council, the Residents Association, and PKBSK8 Inc. Funding was also provided by the Caversham Foundation and the Mana Community Grants Foundation. The park is adjacent to the Pukerua Bay railway station, and replaces an old asphalt bowl which the City Council claims was the only purpose-built skatepark in the Southern Hemisphere when it opened in 1976.

A popular 10-kilometre walkway, the Escarpment Track, constructed as part of the national Te Araroa Trail, links Pukerua Bay with Paekākāriki. The walk features views to Kapiti Island.

== Education ==
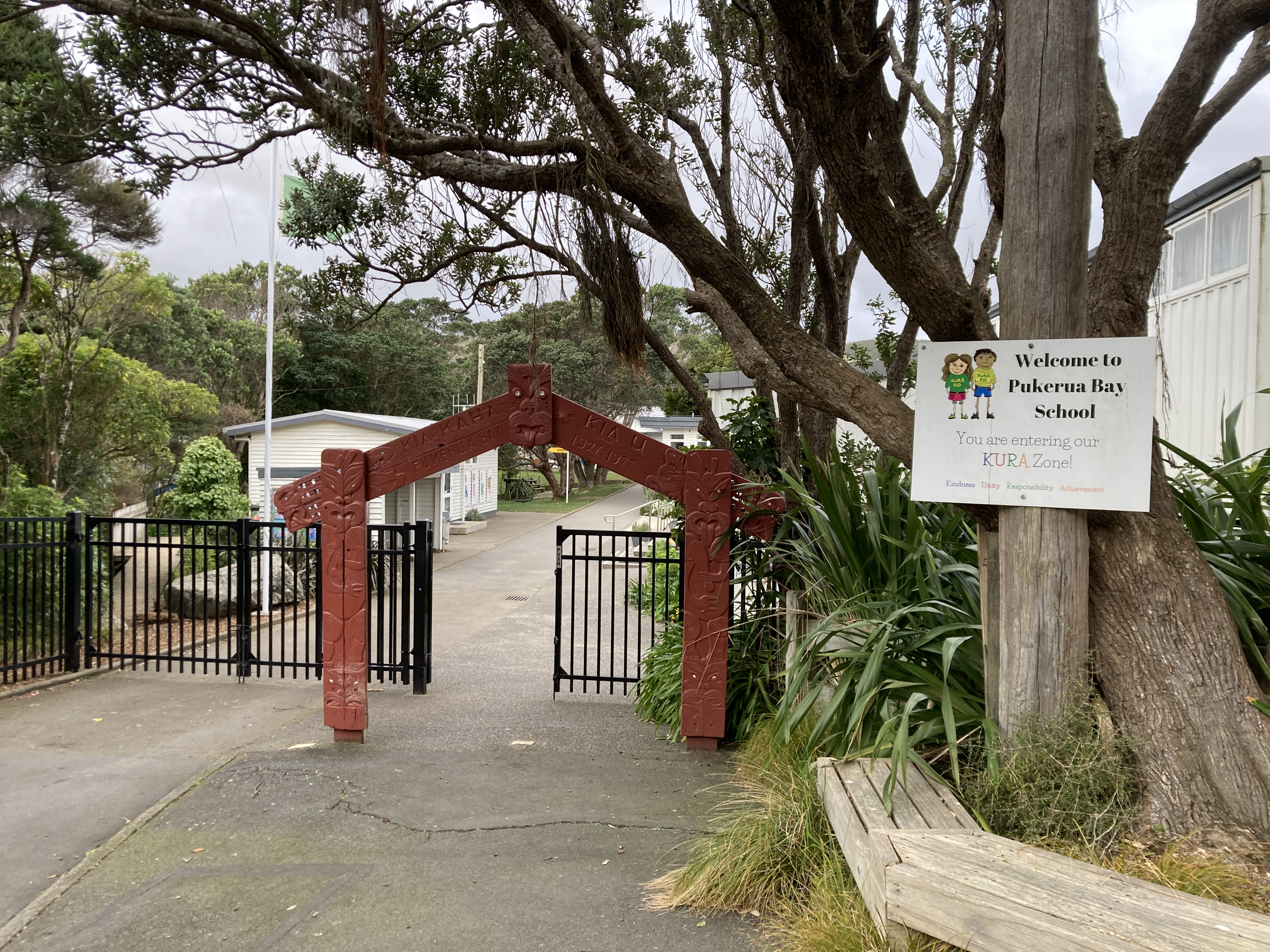
Pukerua Bay School entrance

Pukerua Bay School is a co-educational state primary school for Year 1 to 8 students, with a roll of 155 as of July 2026. It opened in 1927.

Following primary education, most students go to either Aotea College, Mana College, or Kāpiti College for their secondary school education. Pukerua Bay also has a kindergarten.

== Notable residents ==
Prominent residents are filmmaker Dame Jane Campion, artist Pauline Morse, authors Gillian Candler and Gay Hay.

Former prominent residents include poets Louis Johnston, Sam Hunt, James K. Baxter, Denis Glover, Meg Campbell, Alistair Campbell, composer Jenny McLeod, film editor John Gilbert, actress Davina Whitehouse, artist Robin Kay, politician Dame Margaret Shields and former CEO of Meridian Energy Dr Keith Turner. Pukerua Bay is also the birthplace and childhood home of film director Sir Peter Jackson, whose first feature film, Bad Taste, was filmed there. He later went on to direct the Lord of the Rings film trilogy and its prequel The Hobbit trilogy. Karl Kippenberger, bass player of rock group Shihad also grew up in Pukerua Bay.
