= Gordon Challis =

New Zealand poet

Cecil Gordon Challis (3 July 1932 – 2 March 2018) was a New Zealand poet.

== Background ==
Challis was born in a Welsh family in Birmingham, England, and raised there and in Sydney. After living for a time in Spain, he arrived in New Zealand in 1953 and worked as a postman in Wellington and studied psychology and social work at Victoria University. After working as a psychiatric social worker in Porirua Hospital 1961–62, he joined the new Hastings psychiatric unit as a psychologist. He returned to psychiatric social work in 1973, at Canberra, and retired from it in 1988, at Porirua, and moved to Nelson. During his final years, Challis lived in Golden Bay.

== Poetry ==
Challis began writing poetry at Victoria University. His work was widely published in literary periodicals, especially Landfall, and in 1960 Charles Brasch nominated him as one of the four leading contenders for poetic fame in New Zealand in the coming decade. A poetic sequence, "The Oracle", was published in Landfall 60 (1961), the first poem of which subsequently appeared in Challis's collection, Building (Caxton, 1963). The intense pressures of mental health work led Challis to abandon writing poetry and, apart from translations from Spanish for Landfall, he published no poetry. After his retirement from mental health care, Challis found "to his surprise" that writing slowly began returning to him. He had new work published in The New Zealand Listener and Landfall. In 2003 Challis published his second collection, The Other side of the brain and in 2009, his third collection Luck of the Bounce appeared.

Challis's work has been linked with Louis Johnson (the most influential), Peter Bland and Charles Doyle, all three immigrant English poets writing in Wellington from the mid-1950s. These poets dealt with personal experience in a contemporary urban, often domestic, setting, and using modernist techniques. Andrew Mason see Challis's most enduring work as more distinctive than the work of those poets. In Building, certain poems ("The Iceman", "The Shadowless Man", "The Thermostatic Man", "The Asbestos-Suited Man in Hell" and its sequel "The Inflammable Man") explore psychological states and the development of personal identity. Others in that first collection ("The Black One", "The Sirens" and "The Oracle") are an often ironic reworking of myths or archetypes into contemporary situations. The poems are all "linguistically inventive" but "carefully crafted". Challis's poetry published in the twentieth century is characterised by an "apparent distance", almost a "clinical detachment", which "subverts the immediate or expected emotional response". "Beneath that, however, there is a deeper identification with psychological conditions that are unique to the individual yet common to humankind".

In his third collection, Luck of the bounce (2009), the poems became "sometimes light and quirky, often witty, occasionally self-deprecating but always compassionate". There was a satirical edge to some of the humour, but (in Challis's words) "never his intention to hurt people". He described Luck of the bounce as "part of a progression in his work" with the poems being lighter and more humorous. His earlier works were "news stories from the unconscious mind" but in his third collection they were "news stories from a more conscious kind of awareness" with direct references to local and everyday life . For example, the poem "Getting the music (on 91.4FM)" begins: Living under the hill you have to take /the luck of the bounce – /the diffractive spray from waves clipping /just the right rocks. /This is Upper Takaka /this is Golden Bay /twice as far from Nelson /as Nelson is from it. But he retained his interest in more fundamental matters as he engaged in poetry because of its "intensity of its reflection and its ability to make connections with an audience in its endeavours to fathom the human condition".

== Publications ==
- Building, The Caxton Press, Christchurch, 1963.
- Other side of the brain, Steele Roberts, Wellington, 2003.
- Luck of the bounce, Steele Roberts, Wellington, 2009.
