= Wellington Group =

Group of poets in Wellington, New Zealand

The Wellington Group or Wellington School was a group of poets who worked and lived in and around Wellington, the capital of New Zealand, in the 1950s and 1960s.

== History ==
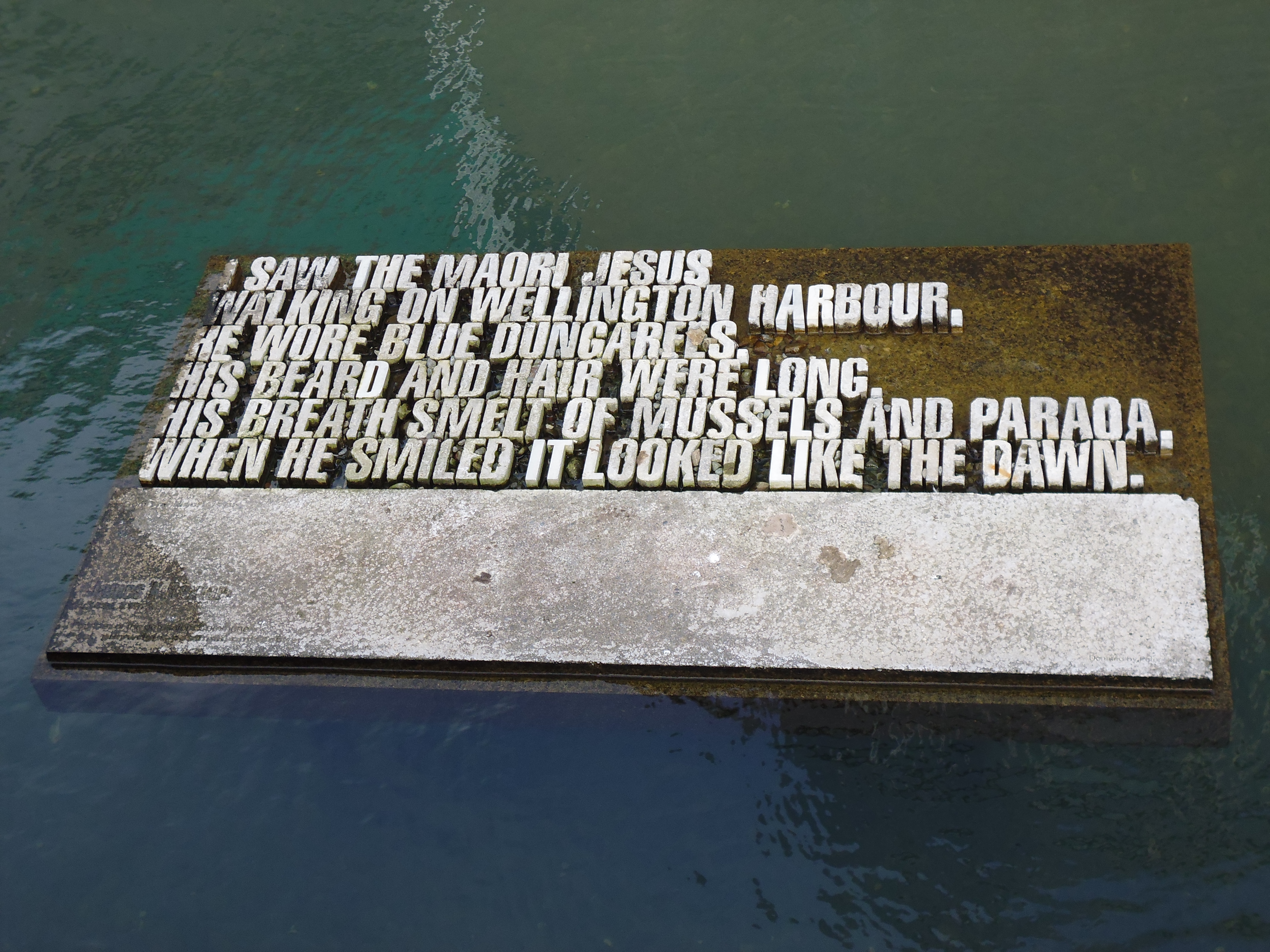
A casting in concrete of "The Māori Jesus" by James K Baxter

The movement started with Louis Johnson, who started up the Poetry Yearbook which ran from 1951 to 1964. In part, it was a reaction to Allen Curnow's dictum of localism in NZ poetry, emphasising universalism, but both the Wellington Group and Curnow liked to use some degree of Māori symbolism.

Another significant publication was Numbers, which ran 1954–1960.

== Members ==
- James K. Baxter
- Peter Bland
- Alistair Te Ariki Campbell
- Gordon Challis
- Louis Johnson
