= Sam Hunt (poet) =

New Zealand poet (born 1946)

Sam Hunt CNZM QSM
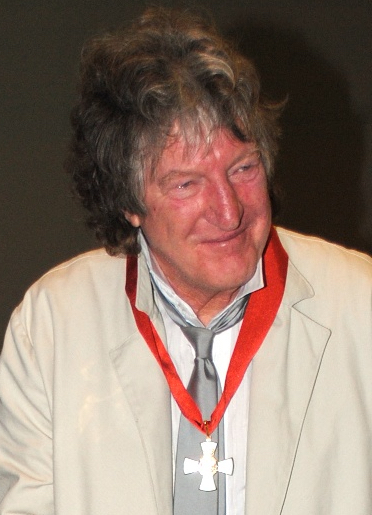
- Born: Samuel Percival Maitland Hunt; 4 July 1946 (age 80); Castor Bay, Auckland
- Occupations: Poet, Novelist

Samuel Percival Maitland Hunt CNZM QSM (born 4 July 1946, Castor Bay, Auckland) is a New Zealand poet, especially known for his public performances of poetry, not only his own poems, but also the poems of many other poets. He has been referred to as New Zealand's best-known poet.

== Background ==
Hunt's father, a barrister, was sixty when Hunt was born (his mother was 30). Hunt grew up at Castor Bay on the North Shore of Auckland. He became interested in poetry because of his mother. Hunt loved his unconventional parents and " ... early poems featuring his father remain amongst his best". Hunt has an older brother, Jonathan, and they have an older half-brother, Alexander Hunt.

== Education ==
Hunt was educated at St Peter's College, Auckland which he attended from 1958 to 1963. At St Peter's Hunt chafed under the Christian Brothers' authoritarianism. He would later recount on numerous occasions an incident in which he was strapped for reciting a poem by James K. Baxter, which had sexual imagery, in the classroom. He was 14 at the time.

He expressed his individuality and the pressures of adolescence in poems. Some of his earliest poems were published in the St Peter's College annual magazines. However, Hunt was good at some sports (running and diving) and had academic success. He has said that at the end of his sixth form year (he was 16) it was indicated to him by the headmaster of the school that he was not expected to return for the upper sixth form year. Hunt interpreted this as a request to leave school, which he did. In his final year at St Peter's his English master had been the poet Ken Arvidson and he had obtained University Entrance.

Hunt has said that "if Mr Arvidson ... had not come to the school, I would not have lasted [at St Peter's] as long as I did, and I'd just turned sixteen when I left. He introduced me to poets like Gordon Challis, who I've gone on loving ever since". Arvidson endowed a poetry prize at St Peter's that was awarded to Hunt in 1963. One of Hunt's most reproduced poems is Brother Lynch, a poem about a St Peter's College teacher, Brother J B Lynch, who was sympathetic to the young Hunt. An annual literature competition at St Peter's College is named after Hunt, and he has acted as its judge. He is also remembered at St Peter's because of the large Pōhutukawa surviving from the early days of the college and dubbed the Sam Hunt Tree from which the student Hunt recited poems to his bemused contemporaries.

In the period 1964–67, Hunt led a restless wandering life around New Zealand but particularly between Auckland and Wellington, attending university in both cities. He spent brief periods truck-driving and panel-beating, but he graduated from teachers college and taught briefly in a secondary school (Mana College) before deciding, in the late 1960s, to devote himself to poetry writing.

== Poet ==
Hunt was among the younger New Zealand poets who began to be published in the late 1960s. He was first published in Landfall in 1967. Hunt and other young poets were interested in daily linguistic usage and in the natural units of speech rather than any special poetic language. This expressed itself in a restoration of oral aspects of poetry and a stress on performance.

Many of his poems are characteristically expressions of feeling in a single surface line which leads to a poignant close. His own experience is his single subject; moments in his life, love and its loss, and poems about his father, mother and sons. A number of Hunt's works share common themes and characters, such as the poems Porirua Friday Night and Girl with Black Eye in Grocer's Shop, both of which feature the same female character. "Everything Hunt writes is geared for personal performance: his lyrics are deliberately uncomplicated and colloquial; their traditional forms and regular rhythms allow 'the stories and myths [to be] fleshed and invested with energy and power'". Critics have noted Hunt's "unabashed romanticism". As Hunt wrote, Romantics, so they say,/ don't ever die! (second "Song"). Hunt has been called "a kind of ["laconic"] Jack Kerouac" – whose poems (he has called them "roadsongs") are direct and simple, "surprised by their own powerful emotion".

His romanticism has been compared with that of another New Zealand poet, Hone Tuwhare and their romanticism has been credited with contributing to the popularity of both poets. From the late 1960s until 1997, Hunt lived in a number of locations around the Pāuatahanui inlet near Wellington. Many of the events in each dwelling are described in his verse, notably Bottle Creek (where he was joined by his famous black and white sheepdog, "Minstrel"), Battle Hill (where his older son, Tom, was born), Death's Corner (formerly the farmhouse of a Mr Death) and then back to a boatshed in Paremata. Other poems (see above) are set in Porirua nearby. In the 1980s Hunt with Jack Lasenby and Ian Riggir (who both lived in Paremata) published poems on an 1886 upright press obtained from the Government Printing Office.

He lived for a time Pukerua Bay near Wellington. In 1997 Hunt moved to Waiheke Island near Auckland. He later moved to Paparoa, Kaipara in Northland with his younger son, Alf.

Hunt has been a central figure in New Zealand literature since the publication of his first mature work From Bottle Creek: Selected Poems 1967–69 in 1969, published when the poet was aged just 23. He was a prolific writer in the 1970s–1990s. By focusing on the public performance aspects of poetry, Hunt was the "young poet" who most successfully reached a wider audience. Hunt pointed out how his poetry showed up the intellectuality of his contemporaries and their inclination to see popular culture as input rather than output. Much of Hunt's output is in a style similar to those of Denis Glover, Alistair Campbell, and James K. Baxter. These poets were personal friends as well as influences on Hunt. Baxter was particularly important to, and wrote many poems for, Hunt. In one of the most important of these poems, Letter to Sam Hunt, Baxter provided advice to the young Hunt. Hunt frequently delivers Baxter poems in his performances and has claimed to have committed 200 of them to memory. Many of Hunt's performance tours have been undertaken with another poet and "fellow exuberant", Gary McCormick.

Hunt has a high regard for other twentieth-century English language poets such as William Butler Yeats, W. H. Auden and Dylan Thomas (Hunt particularly loves Thomas' poem, In my Craft or Sullen Art, which he sees as speaking to his own mission as a poet; he has said that he sometimes gives his occupation (to Customs Officers and such) as "sullen artist"). He also loves foreign language poets such as the Italian, Salvatore Quasimodo, and the Hungarian poet Jozsef Attila (Hunt often recites Attila's poem A Hetedik or The Seventh with which he is familiar in both English and Hungarian (having heard it as a child often delivered by a Hungarian friend of his family)). Hunt also admires the work of Bob Dylan amongst many other poets. As well as his own poems, Hunt, in his performances, recites poems by all these poets, whether famous, obscure or anonymous (from sometimes unlikely sources, for example The War Cry). It is the quality of poems that is most important to him. After a publishing gap of nearly a decade, Hunt has published in most years since 2007. Hunt's book sales far exceed most New Zealand poets.

In April 2009, New Zealand musician David Kilgour, of cult band The Clean, released an album on which poems by Hunt were reinvented as song lyrics. In 2014, Hunt and Kilgour reunited with The Heavy 8s, to create a second album. Unlike the first album, where Kilgour was lead vocalist, Hunt is the lead vocalist on "The 9th". The album was released in May 2015 to critical acclaim and was supported by gigs in Queenstown, Dunedin, Wellington and Auckland following its release.

== Iconic status ==
Hunt's distinctive appearance – tall and thin, usually wearing long, tight, trousers ("Foxton straights" he has called them) with vests and open-chested shirts, with long hair curling wildly above a well-worn face – is complemented by the familiar gravelly drawl, the rhythmic, sometimes staccato and sometimes incantatory quality of his recitation (often tapping his fingers or flicking a hand to emphasise the poetic beat) and the execution of occasional small dance-like steps of concentration. These have all made him one of New Zealand's most recognisable figures. Once, almost as well-known was his long-time travelling companion, the dog Minstrel. "A bard in the truest sense of the itinerant minstrel, Hunt's turangawaewae [i.e. 'one's own turf', literally: 'a place to stand'] is the public bar. Touring the pubs with bands of musos and poets, he is himself one of the national icons". Hunt is also a familiar figure in New Zealand figurative art, notably in paintings by Robin White, such as in Sam Hunt at the Portobello Pub, painted in 1978. In 2012, the artist Dick Frizzell completed a series of paintings of Sam Hunt poems. At the opening of the exhibition of those paintings on 7 February 2012, Frizzell said that he and Hunt had, in their respective paintings and poems, committed the ultimate "sin", the "sin of being understood".

== Honours and awards ==
Hunt was awarded a Robert Burns Fellowship at the University of Otago in 1975, and spent 1976 in Dunedin. In the 1985 Queen's Birthday Honours, he was awarded the Queen's Service Medal for community service, and in the 2010 Queen's Birthday Honours, he was appointed a Companion of the New Zealand Order of Merit, for services to poetry. In 2012 he received a Prime Minister's Award for Literary Achievement.

== Sam Hunt Wine ==
In June 2015, Hunt released his own range of wines, under the Sam Hunt wine label. The range was developed in association with Auckland-based fine wine retailer and distributor, La Cantina Wines. Each of the five wine varieties (Sauvignon Blanc, Chardonnay, Pinot Gris, Pinot Noir, Merlot Malbec) features poetry from Hunt on the label and has a QR code that enable users to listen Hunt, Kilgour and The Heavy 8s performing brief excerpts of the poems.

== Published works ==
For a comprehensive list of works, check the catalogue at the National Library of New Zealand

- From Bottle Creek: Selected Poems 1967–69 (1969)
- Bracken Country (1971)
- From Bottle Creek (1972)
- Roadsong Paekakariki (1973)
- South Into Winter: Poems and Roadsongs (1973)
- Time To Ride (1975)
- Drunkard's Garden (1977)
- Poems for the Eighties : New Poems (1979)
- Collected Poems 1963–1980 (1980)
- Running Scared (1982)
- Approaches To Paremata (1985)
- Selected Poems (1987)
- Making Tracks(1991)
- Naming the Gods (1992)
- Down the Backbone (1995)
- Roaring Forties (1997)
- James K. Baxter: Poems selected and introduced by Sam Hunt (2008)
- Doubtless: new and selected poems (2008)
- Backroads, Charting a Poet's Life (2009)
- Chords & Other Poems (2011)
- Knucklebones: Poems 1962–2012 (2012)
- Salt River Songs (2016)
- Coming To It: Selected Poems (2018)
