= Alistair Te Ariki Campbell =

New Zealand poet, playwright and novelist

Alistair Te Ariki Campbell ONZM
- Born: 25 June 1925; Rarotonga, Cook Islands
- Died: 16 August 2009 (aged 84); Wellington, New Zealand
- Occupations: Poet, playwright, novelist
- Spouses: Fleur Adcock (m. 1952; div. 1957) Meg Campbell (m. 1958; died 2007)
- Children: 5
- Writing career
- Movement: Wellington Group
- Website: poems.nz

Alistair Te Ariki Campbell ONZM (25 June 1925 – 16 August 2009) was a poet, playwright, and novelist. Born in the Cook Islands, Campbell was the son of a Cook Island Māori mother and a Pākehā father, who both died when he was young, leading to him growing up in a New Zealand orphanage. He became a prolific poet and writer, with a lyrical and romantic style tempered by a darkness borne out of his difficult childhood and struggles with mental health as a young adult. Although he wrote about Māori culture from his earliest works, after a revelatory return to the Cook Islands in 1976, his later works increasingly featured Pasifika culture and themes.

Campbell received a number of notable awards during his lifetime including the New Zealand Book Award for Poetry and Prime Minister's Award for Literary Achievement, and is considered one of New Zealand's foremost poets as well as a pioneer of Pasifika literature written in English.

== Early life and career ==
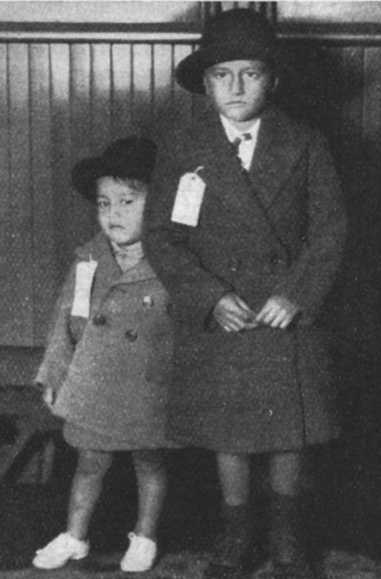
Campbell and his younger brother, Bill, on their way to New Zealand in 1933 after the deaths of their parents

Campbell was born in Rarotonga, on 25 June 1925, and spent his early years on Penrhyn atoll or Tongareva. His mother, Teu Bosini, was Cook Island Māori, and his father, John Archibald (Jock) Campbell, was a Pākehā New Zealander of Scottish descent. His father was a former World War I soldier who worked on the island as a successful trader. In 1932, when Campbell was seven, his mother died from what may have been tuberculosis. The following year, his father also died after becoming an alcoholic. Campbell was sent with his younger brother, Bill, to live with their grandmother in Dunedin, in the South Island of New Zealand. She already had care of their two older siblings. She was however unable to cope with the four children given the Great Depression and sent the children to an orphanage in 1934, where Campbell spent the next six years. In later life, he said that he did not remember the years after his father's death due to his grief. Although he spoke little English at the time of the move to New Zealand, he quickly learnt, and found the books in the orphanage to be a refuge from his feelings of abandonment. He attended Otago Boys' High School, where he did well academically and in sports, but experienced racism from other students due to his Cook Island heritage. He began writing poetry around this time.

He studied first at the University of Otago and then attended Victoria University of Wellington off and on between 1944 and 1952, while working various menial jobs to support himself. His oldest brother, Stuart, was killed while serving with the Māori Battalion in Italy in 1945. At the University of Otago he became friends with James K. Baxter, another famous New Zealand poet. In 1949 his poem "The Elegy" was published in Landfall, marking his first significant publication. It was dedicated to his friend Roy Dickson who had died in a mountaineering accident in 1947, having previously accompanied Campbell on trips to central Otago. The poem was set to music by his friend, composer Douglas Lilburn, in 1951. He became a part of the Wellington Group in the 1950s, a group of poets who saw themselves as having a different perspective to Allen Curnow, another notable New Zealand poet. Other members of the group included Baxter, Louis Johnson and Peter Bland. In this time he was a founder and editor of two literary magazines, Hilltop and Arachne.

== Literary career ==
Campbell's first poetry collection, Mine Eyes Dazzle, was published in 1950. It was the first book published by the Pegasus Press, and was reprinted in 1951 and 1956. The first part of the book was his poem "The Elegy", and it also featured love poems about unattainable and beautiful women; the title of the book combined both themes, having been taken from a line in The Duchess of Malfi: "Cover her face; mine eyes dazzle; she died young". His writing was known for being lyrical and romantic in style, if somewhat dark, and his early poetry did not mention his Cook Islands heritage. In 1953 he graduated from Victoria with a Bachelor of Arts, and the following year he obtained a teaching diploma from Wellington Teachers' College. In 1952 he married his first wife, the poet Fleur Adcock; they had two sons but divorced six years later. The two remained on good terms in later years.

After obtaining his teaching diploma, Campbell taught for a short period at Newtown School in Wellington, and subsequently became the editor of the New Zealand School Journal from 1955 to 1972. He married his second wife, Aline Margaret (Meg) Anderson, in 1958; she was a young actress who would later become a poet herself, and they had a son and two daughters together. In 1961 they moved to Pukerua Bay near Wellington, where they lived for the rest of their lives. In the same year he wrote a novel for children, The Happy Summer (1961).

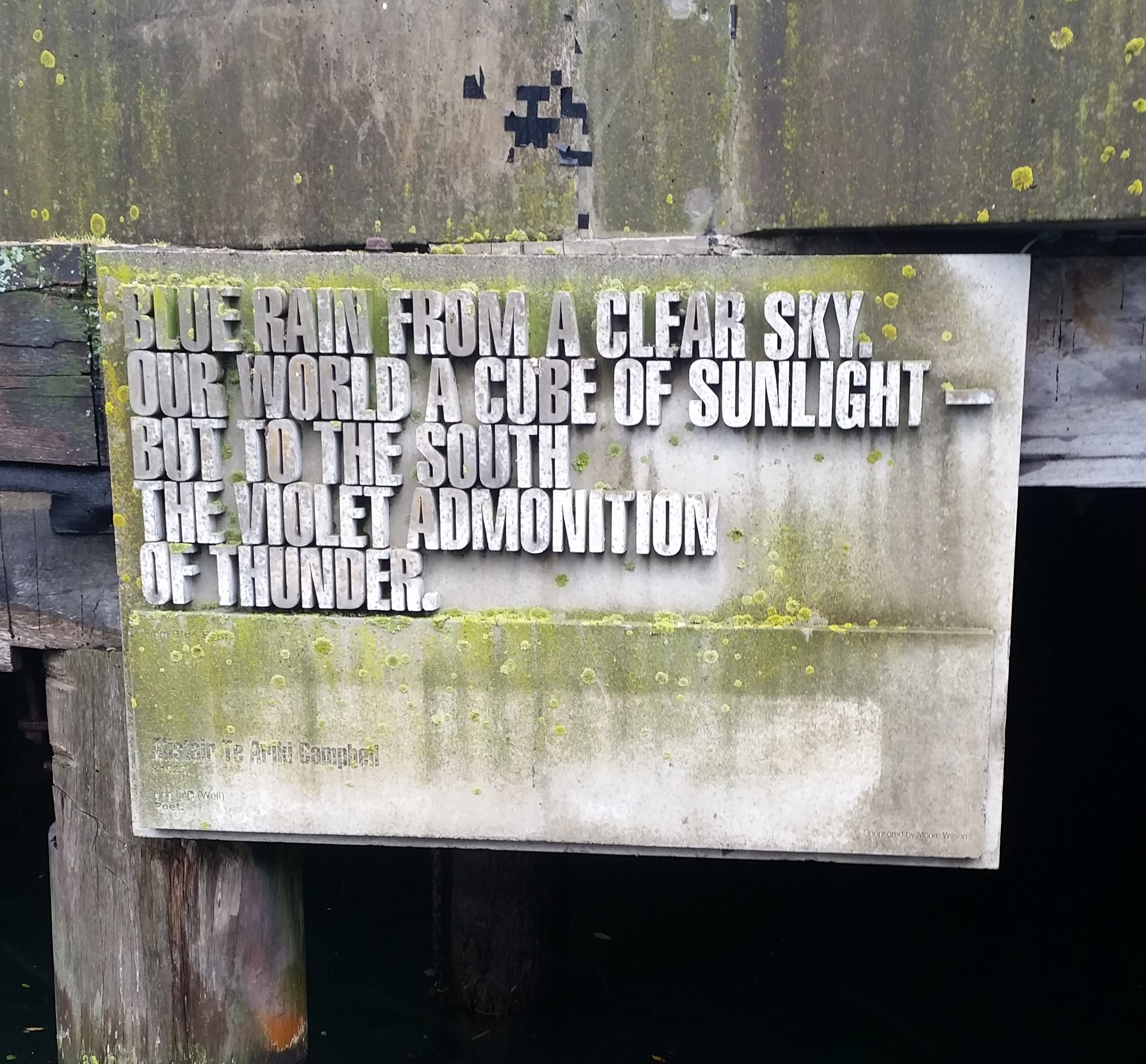
Quote from Campbell on the Wellington Writers Walk

During his early working life Campbell experienced some mental breakdowns as he recovered from his childhood experiences, and his wife also suffered from severe post-natal depression. These experiences led him to turn to writing and explore his troubles in poetry; in a 1969 interview he said: "It was almost as if the springs of creativity had become iced over ... my nervous breakdown cracked the ice and allowed the spring to flow once more." He was also inspired by New Zealand's history, with a sequence in the collection Sanctuary of Spirits (1963) featuring narration by the nineteenth-century Ngāti Toa leader Te Rauparaha. In 2001 the sequence was adapted into a ballet and performed as part of the Kapiti Arts Festival. His third collection, Wild Honey, was published by Oxford University Press in 1964. In addition to some new works, it featured some of his earlier poems revised and rearranged for overseas readers. His biographer Nelson Wattie said of the work that "old poems are blended harmoniously with new, so that, more than a retrospective, Wild Honey suggests a future for the poet secure on the foundations he had laid and ... a determination to overcome the obstacles his illness had created by stretching the bow between future and past". In 1965 his poem "The Return" was set to music by Douglas Lilburn, and was Lilburn's first major electronic work.

In 1976, a formative experience in Campbell's life occurred when he returned to Tongareva, together with his younger brother Bill, and rediscovered his Polynesian heritage and family. The trip had been inspired by a letter Campbell had found in the late 1970s, written by his grandfather to Campbell and his siblings in 1933, which expressed love for them and asked them not to forget their family in Tongareva. He said of the return: "Suddenly, we had a family again. As a long-lost son, I was wept over by old ladies, wailing 'Aue!' I also had the clear sensation my mother was there, waiting." From this trip onwards he used his full name, Alistair Te Ariki Campbell. The middle name "Te Ariki" was part of his birth name and meant that his family was of high rank. He had stopped using the name after his move to New Zealand. His Polynesian heritage, which he had begun exploring in the 1960s, from then on became central to his writing and poetry. His 1980 collection, The Dark Lord of Savaiki, focussed on his ancestors through his mother's side, in particular his grandfather, and his feelings as he came to terms with his heritage. In 1984 he wrote a memoir, Island to Island, which traced his life through his childhood in Tongareva and his later return.

From 1972 until 1987 Campbell was the senior editor at the New Zealand Council for Educational Research. From 1987 onwards, Campbell wrote full-time. In addition to his poetry, Campbell also wrote plays such as The Suicide (1966) and When the Bough Breaks (1970), edited a radio programme about poetry in 1958, wrote a trilogy of novels (The Frigate Bird (1989), Sidewinder (1991) and Tia (1993)), and wrote more novels for children such as Fantasy with Witches (1998). He also tutored creative writing, and in the late 1970s, was the President of the New Zealand PEN Centre, the New Zealand branch of PEN International. In 1979 he toured New Zealand with Sam Hunt, Hone Tuwhare and Jan Kemp.

== Later life and legacy ==
Campbell wrote about his father's and brother's experiences in wartime in his later life, with the collection Gallipoli and Other Poems (1999) and a poetic sequence called "Māori Battalion" in 2001. Reviewer Iain Sharp wrote that these later works "rank among his strongest work". Peter Simpson noted that Campbell continued to find "poetry and peace not in repressing his distant past, but in embracing it and exploring it". After the death of his wife Meg in 2007, Campbell edited a joint collection of their poems called It's Love, Isn't It? which was published in 2008. It was his final collection; on 16 August 2009 he died in Wellington Hospital.

The Dictionary of New Zealand Biography says of Campbell that he was "one of New Zealand's most distinctive poetic voices from the 1950s to the 2000s ... His work, which combined lyricism and darkness, was shaped by an idyllic Rarotongan childhood, early family tragedies, childhood exile to New Zealand, and a transformative return to Polynesia in middle age." He received many honours and awards during his career, most notably the New Zealand Book Award for Poetry for his Collected Poems in 1982, the Creative New Zealand Pacific Islands Artist Award in 1998, an honorary doctorate in literature from Victoria University of Wellington in 1999, and a Prime Minister's Award for Literary Achievement in 2005. In the 2005 New Year Honours, he was made an Officer of the New Zealand Order of Merit. On receiving the award, he said: "This finally justifies all those years that I struggled with my demons and chose the path I am still on. This is my wife Meg's recognition and makes all the sacrifices worthwhile."

In 2016 his Collected Poems were published by Victoria University Press, with Robert Sullivan noting in the foreword that "Campbell's dual Polynesian and Pākehā heritage makes him a foreparent of bicultural and multicultural writing in Aotearoa". Other New Zealand writers like Albert Wendt have cited him as an influence. In April 2020 New Zealand prime minister Jacinda Ardern recorded a reading of his poem "Gallipoli Peninsula" as part of Anzac Day commemorations for Westminster Abbey.

== Selected works ==
=== Poetry ===
- 1950: Mine Eyes Dazzle: Poems 1947–49, Christchurch: Pegasus Press
- 1951: Mine Eyes Dazzle: Pegasus New Zealand Poets 1, Christchurch: Pegasus Press ("With a Foreword by James K. Baxter")
- 1956: Mine Eyes Dazzle, Christchurch: Pegasus Press ("New Revised Edition")
- 1963: Sanctuary of Spirits, Wellington: Wai-te-ata Press
- 1964: Wild Honey, London: Oxford University Press
- 1967: Blue Rain: Poems, Wellington: Wai-te-ata Press
- 1972: Kapiti: Selected Poems 1947–71, Christchurch: Pegasus Press
- 1975: Dreams, Yellow Lions, Martinborough: Alister Taylor
- 1980: The Dark Lord of Savaiki: Poems, Pukerua Bay: Te Kotare Press
- 1981: Collected Poems 1947–1981, Martinborough: Alister Taylor
- 1985: Soul Traps, Pukerua Bay: Te Kotare Press
- 1992: Stone Rain: The Polynesian Strain, Christchurch: Hazard Press
- 1995: Death and the Tagua, Wellington: Wai-te-ata Press
- 1996: Pocket Collected Poems, Christchurch: Hazard Press
- 1999: Gallipoli & Other Poems, Wellington: Wai-te-ata Press
- 2001: Maori Battalion: A Poetic Sequence, Wellington: Wai-te-ata Press
- 2002: Poets in Our Youth: Four Letters in Verse, being four letters in verse to John Mansfield Thomson, Harry Orsman, Pat Wilson and James K. Baxter; Wellington: Pemmican Press
- 2005: The Dark Lord of Savaiki: Collected Poems, Christchurch: Hazard Press
- 2007: Just Poetry, Wellington: HeadworX
- 2007 Two Poems broadsheet, Wellington: The Night Press
- 2008: It's Love, Isn't It? (with Meg Campbell), Wellington: HeadworX
- 2016: The Collected Poems of Alistair Te Ariki Campbell, Wellington: Victoria University Press

=== Other work ===
- 1961: The Happy Summer, a novel for children
- 1965: The Proprietor, a radio play
- 1964: The Homecoming, a radio play
- 1966: The Suicide, a radio play
- 1970: When the Bough Breaks, a radio play
- 1984: Island to Island, memoir
- 1989: The Frigate Bird, a novel, regional finalist for the Commonwealth Writers Prize
- 1991: Sidewinder, a novel, Auckland: Reed Books
- 1993: Tia, a novel, Auckland: Reed Books
- 1998: Fantasy With Witches, a novel
