= Deaths and Entrances =

1946 volume of poetry by Dylan Thomas

First edition (publ. J. M. Dent)

Deaths and Entrances is a volume of poetry by Dylan Thomas, first published in 1946. Many of the poems in this collection dealt with the effects of World War II, which had ended only a year earlier. It became the best-known of his poetry collections.

Some of the poems contained in the volume have become classics, notably Fern Hill. The other poems in the collection are:

- The conversation of prayers
- A Refusal to Mourn the Death, by Fire, of a Child in London
- Poem in October
- This side of the truth
- To Others than You
- Love in the Asylum
- Unluckily for a death
- The Hunchback in the Park
- Into her lying down head
- Paper and sticks
- Deaths and Entrances
- A Winter's Tale
- On a Wedding Anniversary
- There was a saviour
- On the Marriage of a Virgin
- In my craft or sullen art
- Ceremony After a Fire Raid
- Once below a time
- When I woke
- Among those Killed in the Dawn Raid was a Man aged a Hundred
- Lie still, sleep becalmed
- Vision and Prayer
- Ballad of the Long-legged Bait
- Holy Spring
