= K. O. Arvidson =

New Zealand poet and academic

Kenneth Owen Arvidson (1938–2011), was a New Zealand poet and academic.

== Early life ==
Arvidson was born in Hamilton and attended Catholic schools there and in Auckland. His secondary education took place at Sacred Heart College.

== Formation ==
As a student at Auckland University he began publishing poems in Kiwi in the late 1950s while studying science. Arvidson transferred to an Arts course, studying German (as a preliminary for MSc) and attending lectures by Bill Pearson, John Reid, M K Joseph, Allen Curnow and others. While studying for his MA in English, Arvidson taught senior English at St Peter's College from 1961 to 1963. Notably, he taught and considerably influenced the poet Sam Hunt in the lower sixth form in 1963. Terry Locke, another poet, also benefited from his teaching. He endowed a prize for poetry at St Peter's, which was awarded to Sam Hunt in that year.

== Academic career ==
Arvidson lectured at Flinders University of South Australia from 1967 to 1970 and in 1971 moved to the University of the South Pacific to develop a degree programme in English and Commonwealth literature. He joined the staff of the University of Waikato in 1974 and later became a professor of English there. Arvidson's research interests include John Henry Newman, Gerard Manley Hopkins, Victorian literature, Irish literature, Pacific literature and Australian literature.

== Poet ==
Arvidson's verse has appeared in literary magazines in New Zealand and internationally, and has been anthologised in Australia and Japan as well as the Penguin, Oxford and other New Zealand collections. Temporal and spiritual matters balance one another in much of his poetry, in keeping with his Catholic cast of thought.

== Publications ==
For Biographical and professional information including a list of Arvidsons publications see: Aotearoa New Zealand Poetry Sound Archive/ Arvidson K O:
