= Pauline Morse =

New Zealand painter

- Born: Christchurch
- Education: Wellington Girls College, Victoria University
- Known for: Painting

Pauline Morse is a New Zealand painter, based in Pukerua Bay.

== Biography ==
Morse's best-known work is a series of bird studies which appeared on a series of definitive stamps first issued between 1985 and 1991.

Morse is also known for her paintings of Pāuatahanui, Plimmerton, Pukerua Bay, and Mana Island. Her paintings have been exhibited at many New Zealand art galleries. Morse's career as a painter started in Fiji where she was asked to illustrate Birds of the Fiji Bush by Fergus Clunie and then in 1994 she wrote and illustrated Wild Natives.
