= Peter Bland =

British-New Zealand poet and actor

Peter Bland (born 12 May 1934 in Scarborough, North Yorkshire) is a British-New Zealand poet and actor.

== Life ==
He emigrated to New Zealand at the age of 20 and graduated from the Victoria University of Wellington.

He worked as a radio producer for the New Zealand Broadcasting Corporation.

He became closely associated with the Wellington Group which included James K. Baxter and Louis Johnson. He worked in theatre, as co-founder and artistic director of Downstage Theatre from 1964–68.

He returned to Britain in 1970 for a short time but now lives in Auckland, New Zealand.

== Awards and honours ==
- 1977 Cholmondeley Award
- Arvon Foundation International Poetry Competition, England
- 2011 Prime Minister's Awards for Literary Achievement

== Works ==
=== Poetry ===
- Title 3 poets: I. Habitual fevers, by Peter Bland. II. The watchers, by John Boyd. III. The sensual anchor, by Victor O'Leary. Capricorn Press. 1958.
- My Side of the Story: Poems 1960–1964. Mate Books. 1964.
- Domestic Interiors. Wai-te-ata Press. 1964.
- The Man With the Carpet-Bag. Caxton Press. 1972.
- Mr. Maui. London Magazine Editions. 1976.
- Primitives. Wai-te-ata Press. 1979.
- Stone Tents. London Magazine Editions. 1981. ISBN 978-0-904388-40-4.
- The Crusoe Factor. London Magazine Editions. 1985.
- Selected Poems. McIndoe. 1987.
- Paper Boats. J. McIndoe. 1991. ISBN 978-0-86868-130-6.
- Selected Poems. Carcanet. 1998. ISBN 978-1-85754-357-5.
- Let's Meet: poems 1985-2003. Steele Roberts. 2003. ISBN 978-1-877338-07-6.
- Ports of Call. Steele Roberts. 2003. ISBN 978-1-877338-04-5.
- The Night Kite: Poems for Children. Illustrator Carl Bland. Mallinson Rendel. 2004. ISBN 978-0-908783-83-0.
- Mr Maui's Monologues. Steele Roberts. 2008. ISBN 978-1-877448-27-0.
- Loss. Steele Roberts. 2010. ISBN 978-1-877448-97-3.
- Starkey the Gentle Pirate. Illustrator Nikki Slade Robinson. Steele Roberts. 2010. ISBN 978-1-877-577-03-1.
- Coming Ashore. Steele Roberts. 2011. ISBN 978-1-877577-49-9.
- Collected Poems: 1956–2011. Steele Roberts. 2013. ISBN 978-1-877577-99-4.
- Breath Dances. Steele Roberts. 2013. ISBN 978-1-927242-11-7.
- Hunting Elephants. Steele Roberts. 2014. ISBN 978-1-927242-53-7.

=== Plays ===
- Father’s Day (Wellington, 1966; the first locally-written production at Downstage Theatre)
- George the Mad Ad Man (Wellington, 1967, and Coventry, England, 1969).

=== Film and television acting ===
- A Touch of the Other (1970)
- Don't Just Lie There, Say Something! (1974)
- Dangerous Orphans (1985)
- Came a Hot Friday (1985)
- Queen City Rocker (1986)
- Heart of the High Country (1985)
- Porters (1988)

=== Memoir ===
- Sorry, I'm a Stranger Here Myself. Vintage. 2004. ISBN 978-1-86941-632-4.
