= Gay Hay =

New Zealand children's book author

- Born: 1948 (age 77–78)
- Occupation: Author
- Years active: 2008–present
- Known for: writing
- Notable work: Watch Out, Snail! (2013); Fantail's Quilt (2011) both illustrated by Margaret Tolland

Gay Hay (born 1948) is a New Zealand children's book author, based in Pukerua Bay, best known for her books Fantail's Quilt (2011) and Watch Out, Snail! (2013), both illustrated by Margaret Tolland.

== Career ==
Hay worked as a primary school teacher and librarian before writing picture books for children and teachers published with Page Break.

== Recognition ==
In 2012, Fantail's Quilt was a finalist in the LIANZA Children's Book Awards: Russell Clark Award.
In 2014, Watch Out, Snail! was a finalist in New Zealand Post Book Awards, Children & Young Adults: Picture Books.

== Reception ==
Reviewers said of Fantail's Quilt, "A simple story with a strong message about predation [it] will have preschoolers anxious about the fate of the fantail babies right to the last page. Pukerua Bay writer Gay Hay and Porirua artist Margaret Tolland capture the spirit of the elusive birds and their shady bush setting." "[An] effective angle on environmental concerns ... written in poetic prose ... [i]t encourages us to reflect on the environmental implications and the dangers introduced species pose to our birdlife."

About Watch Out, Snail!, reviewers wrote, "Short, sharp text heightens the sense of tension and drama ... It is great to see an information book for young readers about a little-known animal with such an engaging storyline and attractive illustrations." "Snail wends through the forest, eluding one predator after another, as recounted in spare but effective text: 'Hedgehog shuffles'; 'Rat sneaks up'; 'Possum fossicks.' ... The active, alliterative text reads aloud well". "The language in the book is very descriptive with phrases such as 'shimmering trail', 'gnarly roots' and 'marauding teeth'."

One reviewer described Go, Green Gecko! as similar to We're Going on a Bear Hunt: "The art supports minimal, loosely rhythmic text that uses many different verbal phrases to describe both the lizard's movements in its environment and its methods of gathering food and drink for its mostly insectivorous diet. Every page includes, in bold print, 'Watching out for danger,' followed by how that is done—as in 'looking here and there' or 'looking up and down' ... offering opportunities for participation." Another reviewer said, "This book is captivating and the simple telling of one tiny creature's natural world is enlightening. There is a lot to see and consider on every page as the lively text and enticing illustrations enmesh readers with the world of the green gecko." However, the scientific facts included at the end omitted information about tail regeneration.

== Works ==
- 2011 – Fantail's Quilt
- 2013 – Watch Out, Snail!
- 2015 – Go, Green Gecko!
- 2016 – Will There Be Puffins?
- 2008 – Discovery Time: Developing Key Competencies Through Activity-Based, Child-Directed Learning
