= Wairaka Rock =

Rock southwest of Pukerua Bay, New Zealand

Coordinates: 41°01′49″S 174°52′13.5″E

Wairaka Rock from south

Wairaka Rock, also known as Gibraltar Rock, is a rock located on the coast south-west of Pukerua Bay, north of Wellington, New Zealand.

According to local tradition, the rock represents Wairaka, the wife of the explorer Haunui. Legend holds that after Wairaka fled with her lover, Haunui pursued the pair, eventually overtaking them at Pukerua Bay and transforming Wairaka, her lover, and their companions into stone.
