= In my craft or sullen art =

1946 poem

"In my craft or sullen art" is a poem by Welsh poet Dylan Thomas, first published in Deaths and Entrances (1946). The poem describes a poet who must write for the sake of his craft rather than for any material gains. The speaker is not Thomas himself; Thomas never wrote at night and performed on TV and tours as his "trade".

== Text ==
In my craft or sullen art
Exercised in the still night
When only the moon rages
And the lovers lie abed
With all their griefs in their arms,
I labour by singing light
Not for ambition or bread
Or the strut and trade of charms
On the ivory stages
But for the common wages
Of their most secret heart.

Not for the proud man apart
From the raging moon I write
On these spindrift pages
Nor for the towering dead
With their nightingales and psalms
But for the lovers, their arms
Round the griefs of the ages,
Who pay no praise or wages
Nor heed my craft or art.

== Cultural Influences ==
In 2009, the London-based Poetry Society used the poem for their "Knit A Poem" project. Each letter of the poem was charted and knit onto a square by volunteers. More than 850 volunteers from all over the world participated, and the finished poem was unveiled in front of the British Library in London.

The poem has been set to music as a tone poem by Thomas Hewitt Jones (2008) and read in full in the song "Midnight Hour" by Perth County Conspiracy (1970, on The Perth County Conspiracy Does Not Exist). A phrase from the poem was also adopted as the title of the 1971 film The Raging Moon by Bryan Forbes.
