= James K. Baxter =

New Zealand poet (1926–1972)

- Baxter in c. 1945
- Born: James Keir Baxter; 29 June 1926; Dunedin, New Zealand
- Died: 22 October 1972 (aged 46); Auckland, New Zealand
- Occupation: Poet
- Spouse: Jacquie Sturm (m. 1948)
- Relatives: John Baxter (son)
- Writing career
- Period: 1944–1972
- Movement: Wellington Group

James Keir Baxter (29 June 1926 – 22 October 1972) was a New Zealand poet and playwright. He was also known as an activist for the preservation of Māori culture. He is one of New Zealand's most well-known and controversial literary figures. He was a prolific writer who produced numerous poems, plays and articles in his short life, and was regarded as the preeminent writer of his generation. He suffered from alcoholism until the late 1950s. He converted to Catholicism and established a controversial commune at Jerusalem, New Zealand, in 1969. He was married to writer Jacquie Sturm.

== Early life ==
Baxter was born in Dunedin as the second son to Archibald Baxter and Millicent Brown and grew up near Brighton, 20 km south of Dunedin city. He was named after James Keir Hardie, a founder of the British Labour Party.

Baxter's father had been a conscientious objector during World War I, and both his parents were active pacifists and socialists. His mother had studied Latin, French and German at the Presbyterian Ladies' College, Sydney, the University of Sydney and Newnham College, University of Cambridge. Baxter and his brother were not baptised, although their mother read to them sometimes from the Bible. On his first day of school at Brighton Primary School (now Big Rock Primary School), Baxter burned his hand on a stove and later used this incident to represent the failure of institutional education.

In 1936, when Baxter was ten, the family moved to Wanganui where he and his brother attended St Johns Hill School, and the following year they moved to England and attended Sibford School in the Cotswolds. Both schools were Quaker schools and boarding schools. In 1938 the family returned to New Zealand. Baxter said of his early life that he felt a gap between himself and other people, "increased considerably by the fact that I was born in New Zealand, and grew up there till I was nine, and then attended an English boarding school for a couple of years, and came back to New Zealand at thirteen, in the first flush of puberty, quite out of touch with my childhood companions and uncertain whether I was an Englishman or a New Zealander".

Baxter began writing poetry at the age of seven, and he accumulated a large body of technically accomplished work both before and during his teenage years.

In 1940, Baxter began attending King's High School, Dunedin, where he was bullied, because of his differences to other students (in personality, voice and background), his lack of interest in team sports and his family's pacifism. His older brother, Terence, was a conscientious objector like their father and was detained in military camps between 1941 and 1945 for his refusal to fight in World War II. Between 1942 and 1946, Baxter drafted around 600 poems, saying later in life that his experiences as a teenager were painful but "created a gap in which the poems were able to grow".

In 1943, Baxter's final year of high school, he wrote to a friend that he was considering becoming a lawyer, but was "not decided on it": "If I should find it possible to live by writing I would gladly do so. Yet many men have thought they could, and found it an illusion."

== Life and career ==
=== Early literary career ===
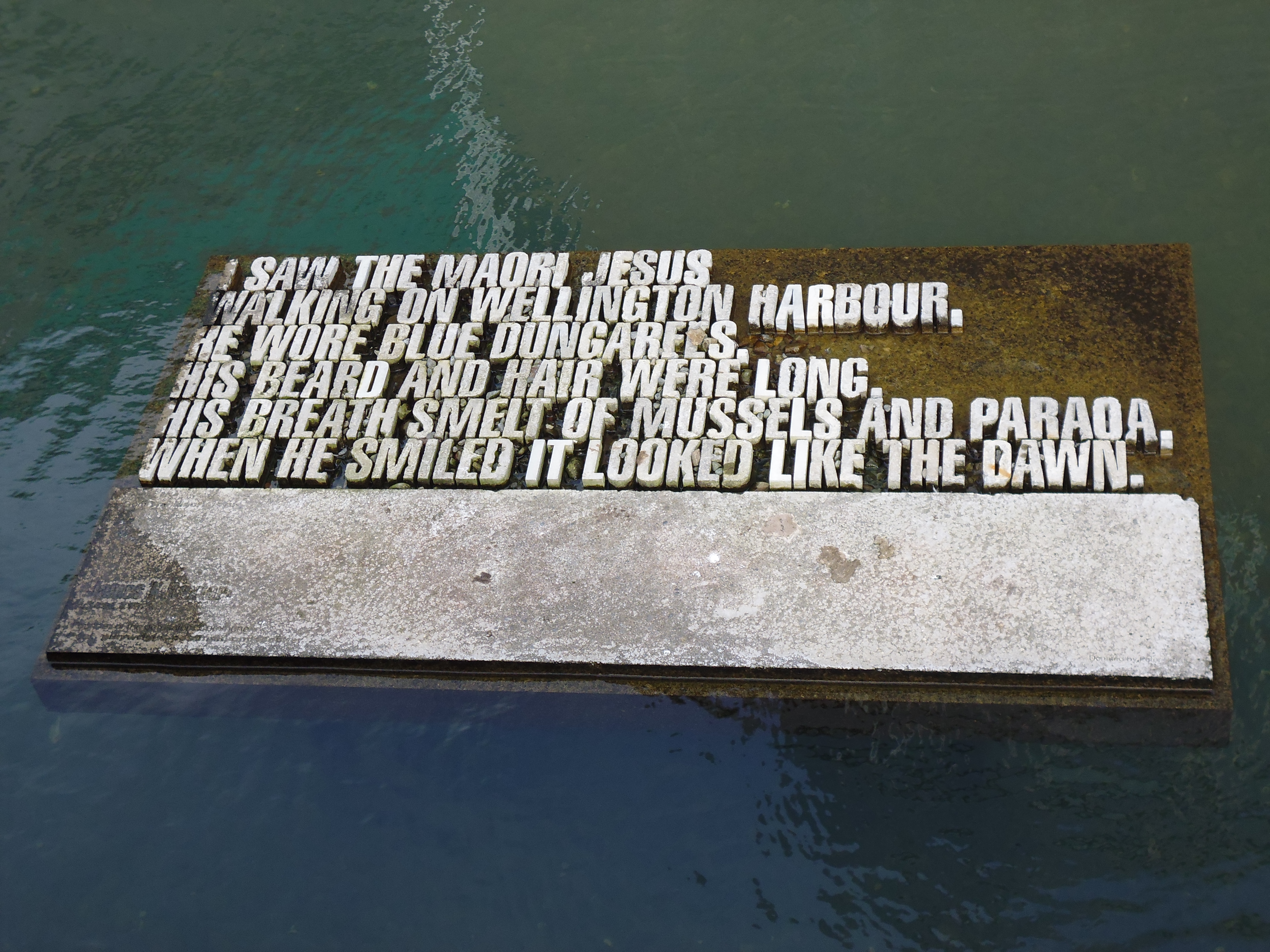
A casting in concrete of "The Maori Jesus", a poem by Baxter

In March 1944, at age seventeen, Baxter enrolled at the University of Otago. That same year, he published his first collection of poetry, Beyond the Palisade, to much critical acclaim. Allen Curnow selected six poems from the collection for 1945 collection A Book of New Zealand Verse 1923–1945, and described Baxter's poems as "a new occurrence in New Zealand: strong in impulse and confident in invention, with qualities of youth in verse which we have lacked". In this year, Baxter also won the Macmillan Brown Prize for his poem "Convoys". The prize was coincidentally named after his Scottish maternal grandfather, John Macmillan Brown.

Baxter's work during this time was, as with his contemporary compatriots, most notably the experimental novelist Janet Frame, largely influenced by the modernist works of Dylan Thomas. He was a member of the so-called "Wellington Group" of writers that also included Louis Johnson, W.H. Oliver and Alistair Te Ariki Campbell. Baxter typically wrote short lyrical poems or cycles of the same rather than longer poems.

After his eighteenth birthday on 29 June 1944, like his father and brother, Baxter registered as a conscientious objector, citing "religious and humanitarian" grounds. The authorities did not pursue him however due to the late stage of the war.

Baxter failed to complete his course work at the University of Otago due to increasing alcoholism, and was forced to take a range of odd jobs from 1945 to 1947. He fictionalised these experiences in his only novel Horse, published posthumously in 1985. It was during this time that he had his first significant relationship, with a young medical student, but the relationship ended due to his alcoholism. He wrote the collection of poems Cold Spring about this early failed relationship, but it was not published until after his death in 1996. In 1947 he met Jacquie Sturm, a young Māori student, who would later become his wife.

In late 1947, Baxter moved to Christchurch where he continued working odd jobs. Although he did not enrol at the University of Canterbury he became the literary editor of its student magazine, Canta, and attended some lectures. His behaviour could be erratic due to his alcoholism. His second collection, Blow, Wind of Fruitfulness was published in 1948, and its themes included the New Zealand landscape and solitude. Curnow, in a review, described Baxter as "the most original of New Zealand poets now living".

=== Marriage and later career ===
In 1948 Baxter married Jacquie Sturm at St John's Cathedral, Napier, and his developing interest in Christianity culminated in his joining the Anglican church and being baptised during that same year. They moved to Wellington and in February 1951 Baxter enrolled at the Wellington Teachers' College. In 1952 Baxter's poems were published in a collaborative volume, Poems Unpleasant, alongside poems from Louis Johnson and Anton Vogt. He completed his teaching course in December 1952, and subsequently published his third major collection of poems, The Fallen House. In 1954 he was appointed assistant master at Epuni School, Lower Hutt, and it was here that he wrote a series of children's poems published later as The Tree House, and Other Poems for Children (1974).

Baxter and his wife had a daughter, Hilary, in 1949, and a son, John, in 1952.

In late 1954, Baxter joined Alcoholics Anonymous, successfully achieving sobriety, and in 1955, he finally graduated with a Bachelor of Arts from Victoria University College. He had also received a substantial inheritance from a great-aunt in 1955 and was able to purchase a house for the family in Ngaio, Wellington. He left Epuni School early in 1956 to write and edit primary school bulletins for the Department of Education's School Publications Branch. This period is likely to have influenced his later writing which criticised bureaucracy.

In 1957 Baxter took a course in Roman Catholicism and his collection of poems In Fires of No Return, published in 1958 by Oxford University Press, was influenced by his new faith. This was his first work to be published internationally, though it was not critically well-received. Through the late 50s and 60s Baxter visited the Southern Star Abbey, a Cistercian monastery at Kopua near Central Hawke's Bay. Baxter admitted however in a letter to a friend that his conversion was "just one more event in a series of injuries, alcoholism, and gross mistakes".

Baxter and Sturm separated in October 1957. While it has been reported that their separation was due to Baxter's wife, a committed Anglican, having been dismayed by his conversion to Catholicism, their great-grandson Jack McDonald has stated that it was in fact "a loss of trust, which was only in part a result of his secretly taking instruction as a Catholic."

Later in 1958, Baxter received a UNESCO stipend to study educational publishing and began an extended journey through Asia, and especially India, where Rabindranath Tagore's university Shantiniketan was one of the inspirations for Baxter's later community at Jerusalem, New Zealand. In India he was reconciled with his wife and contracted dysentery. His writing after returning from India was more overtly critical of New Zealand society, evident in the collection Howrah Bridge and Other Poems (1961). He was particularly concerned about the displacement of Māori within the country.

In the late 1950s and 1960s Baxter became a powerful and prolific writer of both poems and drama, and it was through his 1958 radio play Jack Winter's Dream that he became internationally known. The play was produced by the New Zealand Broadcasting Service for radio, and in 1978 was adapted for the screen by New Zealand filmmaker David Sims. It was performed as a radio play with incidental music by Ashley Heenan, which he then worked into a suite of "nine portraits for orchestra", recorded in 1958 by the New Zealand Symphony Orchestra, conducted by the composer. The play was performed with the NZSO playing Heenan's incidental music in "an epic and almost oratorical rendition" in the Wellington Town Hall as part of the International Festival of the Arts, 1988.

The first half of the 1960s also saw, however, Baxter struggling to make ends meet on a postman's wage, having resigned from the Department of Education in 1963 and refused to take work as a schoolmaster. He also controversially criticised The Penguin Book of New Zealand Verse, an anthology published by his former champion Allen Curnow, for under-representing younger New Zealand poets. However, in 1966 Baxter's critically acclaimed collection of poems Pig Island Letters was published in which his writing found a new level of clarity. In 1966, Baxter took up the Robert Burns Fellowship at the University of Otago, which eased the money worries for a time. He held the fellowship for two years during which time he participated in protests against the Vietnam War. During the fellowship he also had a number of his plays staged at the Globe Theatre by Dunedin director Patric Carey.

=== Jerusalem ===
In 1968 Baxter claimed in a letter to his friend John Weir that he had been instructed in a dream to "Go to Jerusalem". Jerusalem, New Zealand was a small Māori settlement (known by its Māori transliteration, Hiruhārama) on the Wanganui River. He left his university position and a job composing catechetical material for the Catholic Education Board, with nothing but a bible. This was the culmination of a short period in which he struggled with family life and his vocation as a poet.

While planning his move to Jerusalem, in early 1969, Baxter spent some time in Grafton, Auckland where he set up a drop-in centre for drug addicts, acting on the same principles as Alcoholics Anonymous. Around this time, Baxter worked for three weeks as a cleaner at Chelsea Sugar Refinery, which inspired the poem Ballad of the Stonegut Sugar Works. He had been referred to the job by poet Hone Tuwhare. He also adopted the Māori version of his name, Hemi.

Around July or August 1969, Baxter travelled to Jerusalem, which according to John Weir was at that time "a tiny Māori settlement – it had a marae, a resident priest, a church, a convent, resident nuns and some abandoned dwellings." Baxter stayed in a cottage owned by the Sisters of Compassion, and obtained permission for a long stay from the mother general of the sisters. He proceeded to form a commune structured around "spiritual aspects of Māori communal life". It was a place where he felt he could embody both his Catholic faith and his interest in Māori culture. He lived a sparse and isolated existence and made frequent trips to the nearby cities where he worked with the poor and spoke out against what he perceived as a social order that sanctions poverty. His poems of this time, published in his final collections Jerusalem Sonnets (1970) and Autumn Testament (1972), have a conversational style but speak strongly of his social and political convictions.

The commune's popularity grew, in part due to an article in the Sunday Times newspaper in June 1970, and by mid-1970 around 25 people were living in the community. The population increased to 40 permanent residents by May 1971, mostly aged between 16 and 25, living in three abandoned houses, and the number of visitors was estimated by Baxter at about a thousand over the year. The five goals Baxter devised for the commune were: "To share one's goods; To speak the truth, not hiding one's heart from others; To love one another and show it by the embrace; To take no job where one has to lick the boss's arse; To learn from the Maori side of the fence". He was, however, reluctant to impose any kind of rules or work roster.

The increased numbers of residents and visitors, and the lack of order and regulation, led to growing concern from the Sisters of Compassion and Wanganui District Council, and opposition from local residents, particularly the local Māori iwi, Ngāti Hau. Baxter himself was often absent from the commune participating in protests or other social work. In September 1971, the commune was disbanded under pressure from the Council and local farmers. Baxter returned to live in Wellington, but in February 1972 was permitted to return to Jerusalem provided that only 10 people would be allowed to live on the land at any one time.

=== Final years and death ===
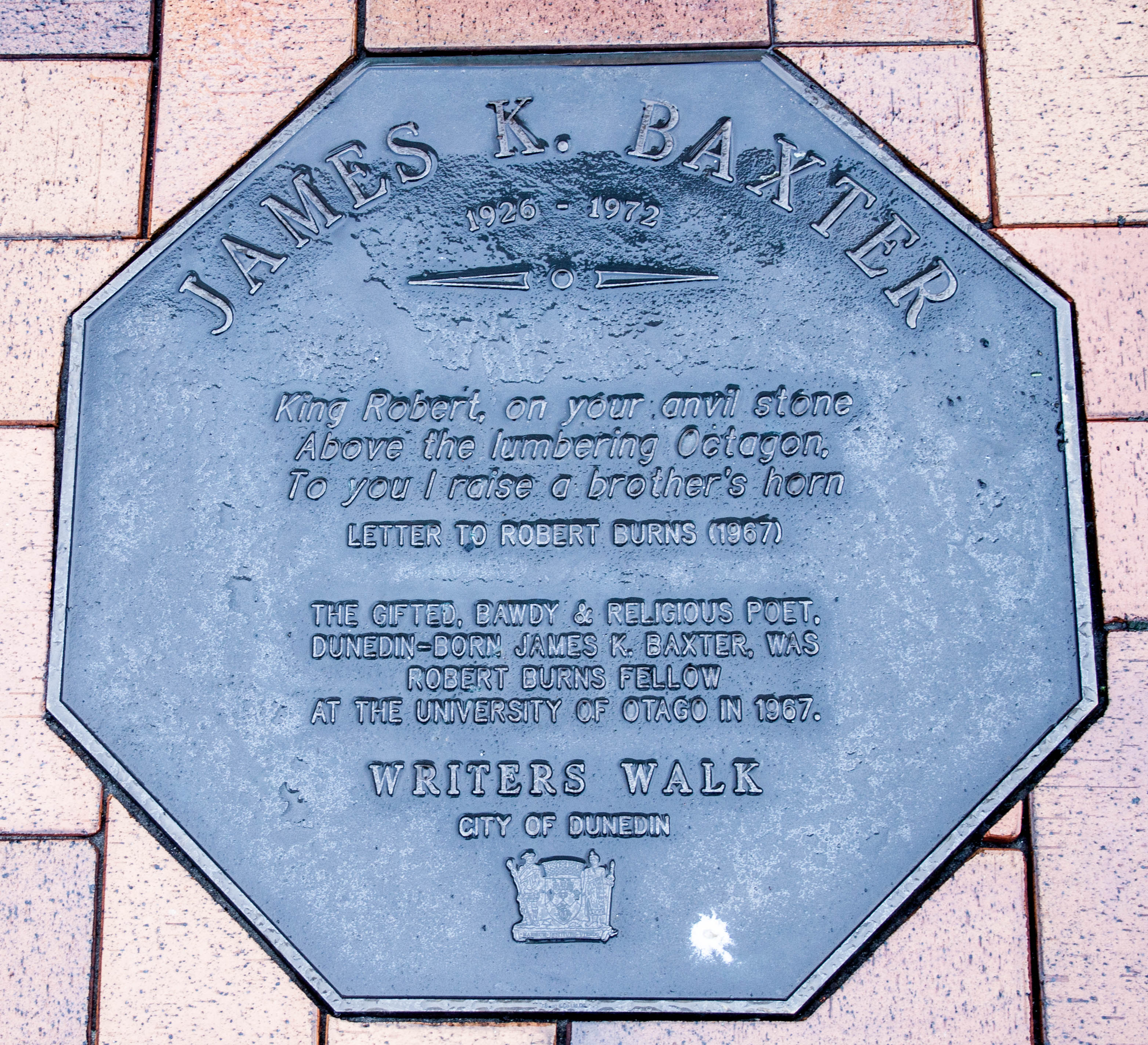
James K. Baxter memorial plaque in Dunedin

The harsh deprivations Baxter adopted at this time took their toll on his health. By 1972 he was too ill to continue living at Jerusalem and moved to another commune near Auckland. On 16 October Baxter visited his long-time friend the artist Michael Illingworth and wrote his last poem on the Illingworths' dining room table before leaving on the 19th. Three days later on 22 October 1972 Baxter suffered a coronary thrombosis in the street and died in a nearby house, aged 46. He was buried at Jerusalem on Māori land in front of "the Top House" where he had lived, in a ceremony combining Māori and Catholic traditions. A river boulder on the burial site was inscribed with his Māori name Hemi.

Sturm was Baxter's literary executor after his death. She collected and catalogued his prolific writing, arranged new and revised publications of his work, and negotiated the use and adaptation of his works. She set up the James K. Baxter Charitable Trust, which supported causes he had supported, for example prison reform and drug addiction rehabilitation programmes, and ensured that all proceeds of his work went to the trust.

== Evidence and allegations of sexual assault ==
In January 2019, the Victoria University Press published a collection of Baxter's personal letters as James K Baxter: Letters of a Poet. The collection was edited by his friend, John Weir. One letter in the collection revealed that in 1960, Baxter confided to another woman that he raped his wife, Jacquie Sturm, after she expressed low interest in sex. New Zealanders reacted with dismay to the revelations, describing them as "awful", "terrible" and "shocking". Marital rape in NZ was first criminalised in 1985. In The Spinoff John Newton wrote that it is no longer possible to talk about Baxter without addressing how Baxter thinks and writes about women.

Paul Millar, a Baxter scholar and personal friend of Sturm, who had been appointed as her literary executor after her death, cautioned against reading the letter as turning Sturm into a victim: "Leaving apart how appalling this letter is – a betrayal on so many levels from the brutal act described, the lack of shame in the description, and the profound betrayal of trust – its publicity is once again putting Jacquie in a subordinate position to Baxter, a bit player in his narrative. ... Jacquie deserves much more than to be remembered as Baxter's victim ... despite everything she endured, she emerged victorious. If people really want to know Jacquie they should seek our her writing, not Baxter's." Mark Williams, emeritus Professor of English at Victoria University, said the admission was consistent with what he knew of Baxter: "He observed his own adulteries objectively as part of the fallen human condition. This even extended to marital rape. I'm not sure if he was simply a phoney, as some have observed. He was genuinely religious. The problem is that his religious faith allowed him to regard his sexual failings—small and great—at a quizzical remove."

Baxter and Sturm's great-grandson, Jack McDonald, wrote that the account was "sickening" and that he believed his great-grandmother "would never have wanted these brutal details made public". He also noted that she never received sufficient credit for connecting Baxter to the Māori world: "The reality is that Nana had introduced Baxter to everything he knew about Māoritanga".

An allegation of attempted rape followed when, in April 2019, the New Zealand news outlet Stuff published an account by Rosalind Lewis (Ros), who had been at the Jerusalem commune in 1970 when she was aged 18 years. Ros described an "attempted rape", which would have succeeded were it not for Baxter's erectile dysfunction. She mentioned a friend of hers, "Angela", who had told Ros that she was permitted to watch him flagellate himself (a variety of religious penance), and that she, Angela, knew of two other women who she claims were sexually abused. No charges were pressed at the time by the women. Lewis said: "This truth needs to sit alongside Baxter's literary achievements. It must be fully acknowledged and never glossed over. This is for the sake of women such as myself and for those who may not be able to find a voice as I have. As ever, in celebrating the genius of Baxter the artist, we cannot overlook the evils of Baxter the human being."

== Critical reception and legacy ==
Criticism of Baxter's poetry has generally focused on his incorporation of European myths into his New Zealand poems, his interest in Māori culture and language, and the significance of his religious experiences and conversion to Roman Catholicism. New Zealand poet laureate Vincent O'Sullivan wrote in 1976 that Baxter is an inherently New Zealand poet: "that is the proportion of Baxter's achievement – the most complete delineation yet of a New Zealand mind. The poetic record of its shaping is as original an act as anything we have." A common theme in Baxter's extensive body of writing was strong criticism of New Zealand society. His biographer Paul Millar said: "If, at times, Baxter appears to evaluate New Zealand society harshly, his judgements are always from the perspective of one intimately involved in the social process."

Baxter's use of the Māori language has inspired both praise and criticism. W.H. Oliver described it as "often a cosmetic device, or worse, an earnest affectation". By contrast, John Newton noted that at least some Māori welcomed Baxter's engagement with their language and culture, and John Weir regards his use as "a genuine attempt at using a bicultural language in this country when no other Pākehā was doing so".

In his critical study Lives of the Poets, Michael Schmidt claimed that Baxter was "one of the most precocious poets of the century", whose neglect outside of New Zealand is baffling. In Schmidt's view, Baxter's writing was affected by his alcoholism. Schmidt also commented on Baxter's influences, noting that his work drew upon Dylan Thomas and W. B. Yeats; then on Louis MacNeice and Robert Lowell. Michael Schmidt identified "an amalgam of Hopkins, Thomas and native atavisms" in Baxter's Prelude N.Z..

The critic Martin Seymour-Smith ranked Baxter above Robert Lowell ("Baxter knew all about narcissism and vanity, and is a much superior poet"), and defended Baxter's high reputation on the grounds of his spiritual and intellectual seeking: "Baxter's energy and sheer intelligence, his refusal to give way to mean cerebral impulses or to give up his terrible struggle with himself, are sufficient to justify his high position in New Zealand poetry". On the other hand, Smith said that Baxter "remained, disappointingly, over-intoxicated with his own energy, and never convincingly manifested qualities of restraint to balance it."

A number of Baxter's poems were written in the ballad form, and Baxter has been described by critics as "New Zealand's principal lyricist". A number of Baxter's works have been translated into music by New Zealand musicians. In 2000, a collection of songs written to Baxter's poems was released, titled Baxter. It featured some of New Zealand's most well-known musicians, such as Dave Dobbyn, Martin Phillipps, Emma Paki, Greg Johnson, David Downes and Mahinārangi Tocker. It was devised by New Zealand singer-songwriter Charlotte Yates.

== Selected works ==
- Beyond the Palisade, 1944
- Blow, Wind of Fruitfulness, 1948
- Hart Crane; a poem, 1948
- Recent Trends in New Zealand Poetry, 1951
- Poems Unpleasant, 1952 (with Louis Johnson and Anton Vogt)
- Rapunzel: a Fantasia for Six Voices, 1953
- The Fallen House, 1953
- The Fire and the Anvil, 1955
- Traveller's Litany, 1956
- The Iron Breadboard: Studies in New Zealand Writing, 1950
- The Night Shift: Poems on Aspects of Love, 1957 (with Charles Doyle, Louis Johnson and Kendrick Smithyman)
- In Fires of No Return, 1958
- Chosen Poems, 1958
- Two Plays: The Wide Open Cage and Jack Winter's Dream, 1959
- The Ballad of Calvary Street, 1960
- Howrah Bridge and Other Poems, 1961
- Three Women and the Sea, 1961
- The Spots of the Leopard, 1962
- The Ballad of the Soap Powder Lock-Out, 1963
- A Selection of Poetry, 1964
- Pig Island Letters, 1966
- Aspects of Poetry in New Zealand, 1967
- The Lion Skin, 1967
- The Man on the Horse, 1967
- The Bureaucrat, 1968 (prod.)
- The Rock Woman: Selected Poems, 1969
- Jerusalem Sonnets: Poems for Colin Durning, 1970
- The Flowering Cross, 1970
- The Devil and Mr Mulcahy, and The Band Rotunda, 1971 (plays)
- Jerusalem Daybook, 1971
- The Sore-Footed Man, and The Temptations of Oedipus, 1971 (plays)
- Ode to Auckland and Other Poems, 1972
- Autumn Testament, 1972 (reissued in 1998, edited by Paul Millar)
- Four God Songs, 1972
- Letter to Peter Olds, 1972

=== Posthumously published ===
- Runes, 1973
- Two Obscene Poems, 1974
- Barney Flanagan and Other Poems, read by James K. Baxter (record), 1973
- The Labyrinth: Some Uncollected Poems 1944–72, 1974
- The Tree House and Other Poems for Children, 1974
- The Bone Chanter, edited and introduced by John Weir, 1976
- The Holy Life and Death of Concrete Grady, edited and introduced by John Weir, 1976
- Baxter Basics, 1979
- Collected Poems, edited by John Weir, 1979 (reissued in 1995 and 2004)
- Collected Plays, edited by Howard McNaughton, 1982
- Selected Poems, edited by John Weir, 1982
- Horse: a Novel, 1985
- The Essential Baxter, selected and introduced by John Weir, 1993
- Cold Spring: Baxter's Unpublished Early Collection, edited and introduced by Paul Millar, 1996
- James K. Baxter: Poems, selected and introduced by Sam Hunt, 2009
- Poems to a Glass Woman, with introductory essay by John Weir, 2012
- James K. Baxter: Complete Prose, four volume set edited by John Weir, 2015 (Victoria University Press)
- James K Baxter: Letters of a Poet, edited by John Weir, 2015 (Victoria University Press)
