= Louis Johnson (poet) =

New Zealand poet (1924-1988)

Louis Johnson

Louis Albert Johnson (27 September 1924 Feilding, New Zealand – 1 November 1988) was a New Zealand poet.

== Life ==
He graduated from Wellington Teachers' Training College. From 1968 to 1980, Johnson lived overseas and traveled widely, with an extended stay in Papua New Guinea.

Johnson worked as a schoolteacher, journalist, and editor of several publications, including the New Zealand Poetry Yearbook (1951–64), Numbers (1954–60), and Antipodes New Writing (1987).

== Awards ==
- 1975 New Zealand Book Award for poetry for Fires and Patterns
- 1976 Montana New Zealand Book Award for Poetry

== Works ==
- "City Sunday"; "Holidays"; "Kapiti Coast", New Zealand Electronic Poetry Center
- Stanza and Scene (1945)
- Roughshod Among the Lilies, (1951)
- The Sun Among the Ruins (1951)
- New Worlds for Old (1957).
- Bread and a Pension. Pegasus Press. 1964.
- Land like a lizard, New Guinea poems. Jacaranda Press. 1970. ISBN 978-0-7016-0346-5.
- Onion (1972)
- Coming and Going. Mallinson Rendel. 1982. ISBN 978-0-908606-14-6.
- Winter Apples (1984)
- True confessions of the last cannibal: new poems. Antipodes Press. 1986. ISBN 978-0-9597805-0-5.
- Terry Sturm, ed. (2000). Selected poems. Victoria University Press. ISBN 978-0-86473-350-4.

== Criticism ==
- "Starveling Year, poems by Mary Stanley", new zealand electronic poetry centre
