= Deirdre Hart =

New Zealand geographer

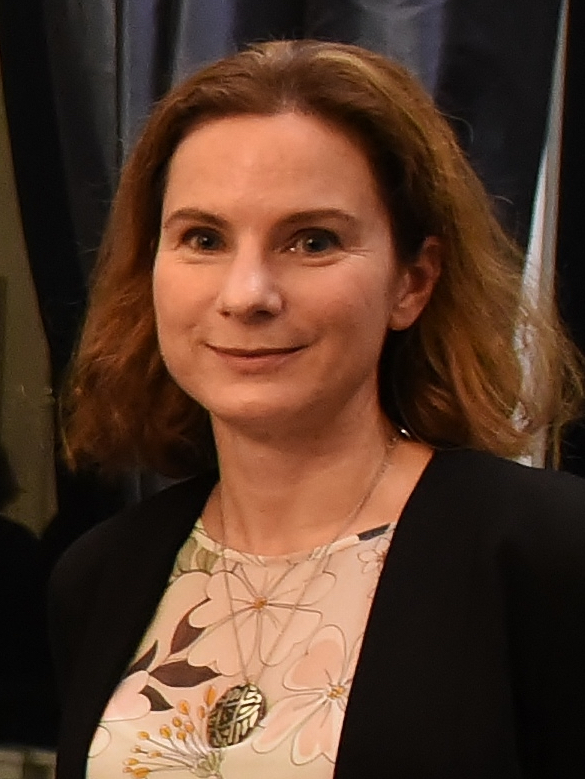
- Hart in 2018
- Awards: Zonta Science Award (2008)

Academic background
- Education: University of New South Wales
- Thesis: Eco-sedimentological environments of an inter-tidal reef platform, Warraber Island, Torres Strait (2003)
- Doctoral advisor: Roger McLean, Graham Symonds, Paul Kench

Deirdre Hart is a New Zealand geographer, and as of 2022 is a full professor at the University of Canterbury. She uses multidisciplinary approaches to research the physical, human and biological processes and interactions in coastal environments. In 2008 she was awarded the Zonta Science Medal.

== Academic career ==
Hart was educated at Christchurch Girls' High School, and then completed a BSc and an MSc at the University of Canterbury before undertaking a PhD titled Eco-sedimentological environments of an inter-tidal reef platform, Warraber Island, Torres Strait at the University of New South Wales. Hart returned to teach at the University of Canterbury, rising to full professor in 2022. Her research focuses on processes and interactions in coastal environments, and includes reef sediments, river mouths, and hazard research.

Hart asks her students to write Wikipedia articles as teaching assignments, after having initially banned students from using the online encyclopedia.

== Awards ==
As the top geographer master's student in her year, Hart won the Eileen Fairbairn Award.

In 2008, Hart was awarded the Zonta Science Prize. The award's convenor said "We look for an outstanding woman scientist able to use the Award to further her career, a person who can be an advocate for women in science but who also contributes to her community. We want a role model for other women scientists who will demonstrate the rewards of entering into the science field and Deirdre certainly shows all these attributes." Hart used the awarded flights to attend the 2008 International Coral Reef Symposium in Florida.

== Selected works ==
- Kelly, David; Hart, Deirdre Erin; Allen, Robert B. (2001). "Evaluating the Wind Pollination Benefits of Mast Seeding". Ecology. 82 (1): 117–126. doi:10.1890/0012-9658(2001)082[0117:etwpbo]2.0.co;2. JSTOR 2680090. Wikidata Q58462945.
- Hart, Deirdre Erin; Kench, Paul Simon (2006). "Carbonate production of an emergent reef platform, Warraber Island, Torres Strait, Australia". Coral Reefs. 26 (1): 53–68. doi:10.1007/s00338-006-0168-8. Wikidata Q56386751.
- Woodroffe, Colin; Bongkoch Samosorn; Quan Hua; Hart, Deirdre Erin (2007). "Incremental accretion of a sandy reef island over the past 3000 years indicated by component-specific radiocarbon dating". Geophysical Research Letters. 34 (3). Bibcode:2007GeoRL..34.3602W. doi:10.1029/2006gl028875. Wikidata Q56386754.
- Matthew W. Hughes (2015). "The sinking city: Earthquakes increase flood hazard in Christchurch, New Zealand". GSA Today: 4–10. doi:10.1130/gsatg221a.1. Wikidata Q57870980.
- Hart, Deirdre Erin (2007). "River-Mouth Lagoon Dynamics on Mixed Sand and Gravel Barrier Coasts". Journal of Coastal Research: 927–31. JSTOR 26481715. Wikidata Q115584091.
- Brander, Robert; Kench, Paul Simon; Hart, Deirdre Erin (2004). "Spatial and temporal variations in wave characteristics across a reef platform, Warraber Island, Torres Strait, Australia". Marine Geology. 207 (1–4): 169–184. doi:10.1016/j.margeo.2004.03.014. Wikidata Q115584130.
