= Christchurch Girls' High School =

- Māori: Te Kura o Hine Waiora
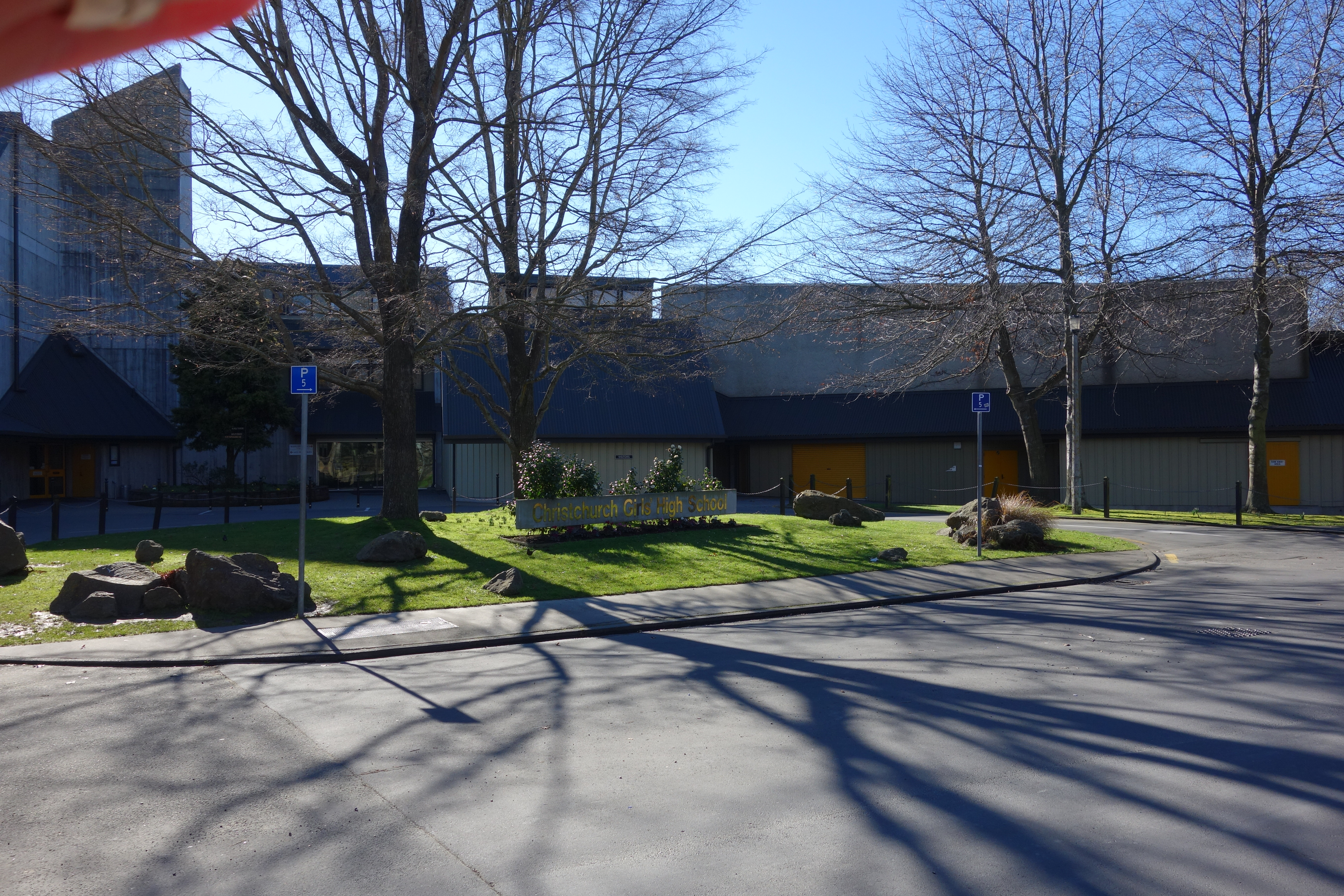
- Christchurch Girls' High School

Location
- 10 Matai Street; Riccarton; Christchurch 8011; New Zealand; 43.5249°S 172.6109°E

Information
- Type: State Secondary (Year 9–13) with boarding facilities.
- Motto: Sapientia et Veritas "Wisdom and Truth"
- Established: 1877; 149 years ago
- Ministry of Education Institution no.: 328
- Chairperson: Lesley Vehekite
- Principal: Helen Armstrong (from 2023)
- Gender: Female
- Enrolment: 1,299 (July 2026)
- Socio-economic decile: 9Q
- Website: www.cghs.school.nz

Christchurch Girls' High School (Māori: Te Kura o Hine Waiora) in Christchurch, New Zealand, was established in 1877 and is the second oldest girls-only secondary school in the country, after Otago Girls' High School.

== History ==
Christchurch Girls' High School was established in 1877, four years before Christchurch Boys' High School. The first headmistress was Mrs. Georgiana Ingle (a daughter of Richard Deodatus Poulett-Harris and half-sister of Lily Poulett-Harris). The second principal Helen Connon (later Helen Macmillan Brown) is better known as she was the first woman in any British university to gain an Honours degree.

The school was originally housed in buildings on the former Canterbury College site, which later became the Christchurch Arts Centre. The school quickly outgrew that space and in 1882 moved to a building on Cranmer Square. This building was renamed the Cranmer Centre when the school vacated it in 1986. The Cranmer Centre building features prominently in the 1994 film Heavenly Creatures based on the 1954 Parker–Hulme murder case involving two students.

The school featured in national and international news in 1972 when two students led a "walkout" from school assembly to protest against the inclusion of religion in school morning assemblies. At the time, schools in New Zealand were supposed to be secular but this was largely ignored and students were usually told to bring a note from their parents if they wanted to opt out of the religious component of school assemblies.

In June 2020, students complained that posters they had put up promoting the Black Lives Matter movement were removed without adequate explanation. Students reported that some staff had said the posters could damage the walls, but that other posters were allowed to remain, while the staff member who took the posters down reportedly said it was because "all lives matter". The incident followed similar complaints at two other New Zealand schools, where students had alleged racist motivations for removing posters. Prime Minister Jacinda Ardern, commenting on the issues across the three schools, said that the matters were for schools to deal with, but she did not discourage the students' actions, while Massey University sociologist Paul Spoonley said it was censorship and appeared to be "institutional racism – racism that has come from the school itself".

== Present day ==
Christchurch Girls' High School, known to many as Girls' High or CGHS, provides boarding facilities for 95 students from years 9 to 13 at Acland House, located 20–30 minutes walk away from school.

The school stands by the Avon River, on a site it has occupied since 1986. Previously, the area was occupied by a mill that was first built in 1861 by William Derisley Wood, which became known as the Riccarton Mill.

The February 2011 Christchurch earthquake had a large impact on the school: it caused extensive damage to the current site; the old Cranmer Centre site was damaged so badly that it was later demolished – and the school's principal at the time, Prue Taylor, lost her husband Brian in the CTV Building collapse.

The current principal is Helen Armstrong, who was appointed the role in November 2023 and formally began acting in February 2024.

== Enrolment ==
As of July 2026, the school has a roll of 1,299 students, of which 187 (14.4%) identify as Māori.

As of 2026, the school has an Equity Index of 419, placing it amongst schools whose students have few socioeconomic barriers to achievement (roughly equivalent to deciles 8 and 9 under the former socio-economic decile system).

== Notable alumnae ==
- Ursula Bethell (1874–1945), poet and social worker
- Alice Candy (1888–1977), academic and second woman lecturer at Canterbury College
- Gay Davidson (1939–2004), journalist
- Eileen Fairbairn (1893–1981), teacher and geographer
- Ivy Fife (1905–1976), painter
- Marama Fox, politician and co-leader of the Māori Party
- Ruth France (1913–1968), novelist and poet
- Helen Gibson (1868–1938), founder of Rangi Ruru Girls' School
- Mary Gibson (1864–1929), Principal of CGHS for thirty years
- Edith Searle Grossmann (1863–1931), writer and teacher
- Deirdre Hart, geographer and professor at University of Canterbury
- Stella Henderson (1871–1926), first woman Parliamentary reporter for a major New Zealand newspaper
- Elizabeth Herriott (1882–1936), academic and first woman lecturer at Canterbury College
- Ethel Jacobson (1877–1965), editor of the Akaroa Mail
- Margaret Lorimer (1866–1954), mountaineer and Principal of Nelson College for Girls for twenty years
- Elsie Low (1875–1909), temperance campaigner
- Jorja Miller, gold medal winner in the 2024 Paris Olympics
- Pauline Parker (born 1938), convicted murderer
- Edna Pengelly (1874–1959), teacher, civilian and military nurse
- Anne Perry (1938–2023; born as Juliet Hulme), English author and convicted murderer
- Christabel Robinson (1898–1988), teacher and community worker.
- Myrtle Simpson (1905–1981), teacher
- Gwen Somerset (1894–1988), adult educator and writer
- Lucy Spoors (born 1990), Olympic rower
- Phoebe Spoors (born 1993), Olympic rower
- Joyce Watson (1918–2015), chemist
- Fay Weldon (1931–2023), English author
- Natalia Zotov (1942–2012), cosmologist specialising in gravity waves

== Notable staff ==
- Catherine Alexander (1863–1928), first known woman to publish a paper in the Royal Society Te Apārangi's Transactions
- Kate Edger (1857–1935), first woman university graduate in New Zealand
- Emily Foster (1842–1897)
- Christina Henderson (1861–1953)
- Leila Hurle (1901–1989)
- Stephanie Young (1890–1983)
- Elsie Low (1875–1909)
- Dawn Lamb (born 1940), schoolteacher
