= Mary Gibson (principal) =

New Zealand teacher and school principal (1864–1929)

- Born: Mary Victoria Gibson; 28 October 1864; Lyttelton, New Zealand
- Died: 1 September 1929 (aged 64); Oamaru, New Zealand
- Occupation: School principal
- Known for: Principal of Christchurch Girls' High School for thirty years
- Relatives: Helen Gibson (sister)

Mary Victoria Gibson (28 October 1864 – 1 September 1929) was a New Zealand teacher and school principal.

Born in Lyttelton in 1864 soon after her mother came to New Zealand, her father was Frederick Denhame Gibson, a port officer in Lyttelton, and her mother was Mary Fox Gibson (née Rodd). Mary Gibson received her education at a private school, followed by Christchurch Girls' High School and Canterbury College, from where she graduated in 1887 with a Bachelor of Arts, and a year later with a Master of Arts in English and Latin.

Gibson started teaching at Sydenham School while she was still at the college. In 1889, Gibson was put in charge of the girls' department of East Christchurch School. She was appointed principal of Christchurch Girls' High School in 1898 after the sudden death of the previous principal, Emily Foster. She remained at the school for 30 years and under her guidance, the roll grew significantly. She retired from CGHS in 1928 and in the following year, she relieved the principal at Waitaki Girls' High School in Oamaru. She developed pneumonia and died in Oamaru on 1 September 1929. Her funeral service was held at Rangi Ruru and she was buried at Waimairi Cemetery. Later in the month, a memorial service was held at ChristChurch Cathedral.

Gibson was from a family of educators. Her father bought a school in Papanui in 1889, and it was run by her sister Helen and her mother; the school was later renamed Rangi Ruru. Her sister Beatrice became principal of Nelson College for Girls.
