= Catherine Alexander =

Catherine Alexander may refer to:

- Catherine Tresa Alexander (born 1989), Indian actress
- Catherine Alexander Duer, (1755–1826), American socialite
- Catherine Alexander, character in The Other Side of Midnight
- Catherine Alexander (botanist) (1863–1928), New Zealand botanist

== See also ==
- Katharine Alexander (1898–1981), American actress
