= Argentine military trials of 2009 =

Set of military trials

The preliminary hearings to do with the planned Argentine military trials of 2009 that in the event failed to take place had the intention to determine the validity of claims made against officers and NCOs by former conscripts for alleged cowardice, brutality and misconduct including the failure to feed the men properly under their command during the 1982 Falklands War.

== History ==
The first round of accusations related to Argentine Army officers and NCOs accused of handing out brutal field punishment to their troops involved involved superiors accused of implementing harsh disciplinary measures to their men in the days and weeks prior to the Battle of Goose Green. Ernesto Alonso, the president of CECIM, an anti-Argentine military veterans' group founded by Rodolfo Carrizo and other conscripts of the 7th Mechanized Infantry Regiment, said, "Our own officers were our greatest enemies ... They supplied themselves with whiskey from the pubs, but they weren't prepared for war. They disappeared when things got serious." Former Private Miguel Savage said in an interview with BBC News, "The punishment was 'estaqueo' - they would peg you to the ground and leave you crucified for hours, with minus 20, rain and even shelling." The Anglo-Argentine veteran that served as a conscript with the 7th Infantry Regiment on Wireless Ridge in the same interview says that one evening he was caught by a corporal stealing a tin of meat. "He made me kneel down, pointed his gun on my head and I was crying and begging for him not to shoot." There are others (including British Intelligence Officer Nicholas Van Der Bijl who interviewed key Argentine prisoners-of-war) who maintain that the officers and NCOs helped the conscripts to make themselves as comfortable as possible under the circumstances, (Note: Not all 12th Regiment conscripts experienced field punishments, and some even came forward to praise Sub-Lieutenant Ernesto Peluffo and said that he would break and share his loaf of bread and that he took his platoon out of Darwin Ridge prior to the fighting to allow his men to have a shower and relax in nearby Darwin. (Diario Momarandu, 25 ANIVERSARIO DE MALVINAS, By Armando Godoy, 02/04/2007)) and that officers, such as Second Lieutenant Juan Domingo Baldini, tried hard to bolster morale, and that their officers and NCOs fought well. (Note: According to Robert Bolia, "Criticism has also been leveled at lower ranking officers for not fighting with their men, although this seems to have little foundation, at least at Darwin and Goose Green where most, if not all, of the company-grade officers were in the trenches with their troops. Indeed, 1st Lieutenant Estevez was killed in action while defending the position near Darwin Hill, and 2nd Lieutenant Guillermo Aliaga and 2d Lieutenant Ernesto Peluffo were seriously wounded during the fight. In general, the officers in command of sections or companies performed valiantly in the action on the Darwin Isthmus". (The Battle of Darwin-Goose Green. Robert Bolia (Military Review; July/August 2005) p. 49.))

In 2009, Argentine authorities in Comodoro Rivadavia ratified a decision made by authorities in Río Grande, Tierra del Fuego, who, according to Argentina, have authority over the islands, by charging 70 officers and NCOs with inhumane treatment of conscript soldiers during the war.Pablo Andrés Vassel, undersecretary of human rights in the province of Corrientes, told Inter Press Service News Agency, "We have testimony from 23 people about a soldier who was shot to death by a corporal, four other former combatants who starved to death, and at least 15 cases of conscripts who were staked out on the ground."

On 23 May 1982, a 12th Regiment conscript, Segundino Antonio Riquelme, from A Company north of Goose Green who had according to Pablo Vassel, Ernesto Alonso and CECIM had reportedly been "starved to death" had in fact died of heart failure (inflamed and enlarged heart because of extreme duress) after he had struggled for weeks to get accustomed to the cold weather, poor food and the bullying in his platoon that he experienced from fellow conscripts. Although his physical and mental collapse was evident, the other conscripts in his platoon that witnessed the abuse but refused to take part in it failed to report it to the 12th Regimental medical officer, First Lieutenant Juan Carlos Adjigogovic and the 12th Regiment chaplain, Santiago Mora, who would regularly visit their positions to hand out chocolate bars, cigarettes and letters from home. (Note: Another conscript to die under similar circumstances was Private Remigio Antonio Fernández of the 5th Regiment at Port Howard, who sank into deep depression, refused to eat and, despite attempts to feed him intravenously, died on 10 June.) There were consequently claims on behalf of nationalistic veteran groups that false testimonies had indeed been used as evidence in order to accuse the Argentine officers and NCOs of complete dereliction of duty, and Pablo Vassel had to eventually resign as undersecretary of human rights of Corrientes in 2010. Private Orlando Javier Ruffino from the 25th Special (Ranger) Regiment's C Company explains that the predicament of Riquelme started soon after the conscript abandoned the frontline positions held by the 12th Regiment's A Company (taking a vital belt-fed machine-gun with him) and taking-up an underground hiding spot in Darwin Schoolhouse outside Goose Green Settlement where he was soon discovered by Ruffino and other Rangers from the 25th Special Regiment and marched back to his position in disgrace as a deserter and where he soon lost the will to live after being beaten up by fellow conscripts and even denied food.

Marine Private Héctor Miguel Rolla, who according to CECIM, had been abused and also died from starvation, had in fact died from hypothermia on the morning of 7 June on Mount Longdon after having spent a good part of a freezing night out in the open while on sentry duty. Several high-profile veterans were skeptical about the accusations of widespread abuse with Colonel Martiniano Duarte, an ex-601 Commando Company officer in the Falklands, saying in 2014 that it has become "fashionable" for ex-conscripts to now accuse their superiors of abandonment. A former conscript, Fernando Pablo Cangiano, of the 10th Armoured Cavalry Reconnaissance Squadron, which fought during the Battle of Wireless Ridge in the Falklands, has also dismissed the claims about the "supposed widespread sadism present among the Argentine officers and NCOs" and the claim that the conscripts had not handled themselves well as soldiers during the ground fighting. A former conscript, César Trejo, of the 3rd Infantry Regiment, who also fought in the defence of the Argentine stronghold of Port Stanley, also accused the then Argentine defense minister Nilda Garré of promoting a "state of confused politics" on behalf of CECIM.

Sub-Lieutenant Gustavo Adolfo Malacalza is accused of handing out harsh field punishment in his platoon dug in on Burntside HIll, in the form of having staked out in the open on the freezing ground three conscripts at Darwin Parks, who had abandoned their positions to go looking for food and for revealing in the process their forward positions to British patrols with gunfire. ""We said it was going to be us next"," said Private Mario Oscar Nuñez, who recalled the death of Private Riquelme. Just before the British landings, on 19 May 1982 he and two other conscripts took the decision to kill a sheep in order to get extra food. The three men were skinning the sheep when they were discovered by Sub-Lieutenant Malacalza, who was accompanied by fellow conscripts of A Company, 12th Regiment and the three accused deserters were given a beating with enraged fellow conscripts taking part. "They started kicking and stomping on us. Finally came the staking".

On 23 May, as the men in the 12th Regiment's A Company (under First Lieutenant Jorge Antonio Manresa) had largely been out in the open for a prolonged debilitating period in the freezing wind and been reduced to often eating half cooked sheep meat in the wet because of the lack of firewood, two Argentine Air Force Chinook helicopters from Port Stanley finally delivered over 100 large boxed ration donations that had arrived from the mainland (from civilians volunteer packers in Buenos Aires) and each soldier in Manresa's company (regardless of rank except for those accused of desertion and other grave offenses) received such luxuries like canned tuna in olive oil and packets of premium cigarettes.

Then Sub-Lieutenant Ernesto Peluffo reports that another three conscripts in the 12th Regiment's A Company had also gone Absent Without Leave (AWOL) around this time seeking refuge in the abandoned house of Brooke Hardcastle. When Peluffo accompanied by a corporal apprehended them the three deserters were discovered to have been earlier on in the kitchen frying potatoes. Rather than risk a potential court-martial with a possible jail-time sentence or even execution they were given the chance to redeem themselves in the battlefield an offer they gladly took in light of their situation and two of them (Privates Roque Evaristo Sanchez and Avelino Nestor Oscar Pegoraro) were killed and posthumously decorated for heroism. Jorge Alberto Altieri, a former private in Sub Lieutenant Juan Domingo Baldini's 1st Rifle Platoon from B Company 7th Regiment would claim that the conscripts on Mount Longdon experienced much hunger, despite permission to go through stockpiled tinned rations on the Argentine strong-hold:

During wartime, the higher ranking officers are in totally different places ... Sub Lieutenant Baldini would receive orders from Major Carrizo who was further down, to use our cold rations and that the more nutritious food we'd get when the fighting started because they didn't know if they'd be able to supply us with food. From 16 April to 11 June we fought, we'd have soup with lentils, green peas and some piece of mutton. We would tell our officer: "We can't tell the British soldiers to wait so that we could get better food and then start shooting ... We weren't properly fed prior to the fighting like we should've been, we were weakened.

In a British documentary, former Private Luis Leccese from the 1st Platoon stated, "Regrettably all we thought about was eating, just food. All we had was just soup, just watery soup. A couple of times we were given bubble gum. That's all we ate, bubble gum." He also revealed that Baldini had once even threatened to shoot Leccese in the head in the presence of the rest of the men after having caught him and Private Juan Antonio Guerra looking for extra food at the company field kitchen on the easter end of Mount Longdon but admits that Corporal José Óscar Carrizo from the 1st Platoon allowed him and Private Orlando Gilberto González after an overnight stay in Port Stanley, to stock up with luxury items such as tinned pudding, cigarettes and even a large cheese wheel from the food depot Corporal Carrizo was guarding at the time in the Moody Brook area. Former Private Félix Benjamín Barreto, from the nearby 3rd Rifle Platoon (under First Lieutenant Enrique Eneas Neirotti) claims that during the last two weeks on the mountain, he gathered three or four sheep to later butcher in order to feed the men in the rifle section that he served in and that they would grill the meat first.

The experiences in Baldini's platoon varied from soldier to soldier. Former Private José Luis Aparicio in an interview with Silvia Paglioni for Bahia Noticias, claims that he and others once escaped into Port Stanley where they were able to buy cigarettes, jam, bread, apples and cookies and that the corporal in charge of his section would allow them to shoot and eat sheep, but that in the last 20 days they hardly got any food. He also admits that the 1st Platoon was taken out of the mountain twice, in April and in the beginning of May, so that the soldiers could get a chance to shower in Port Stanley and that on their last march into town, Baldini allowed the men to stay there overnight inside a commandeered building. In that same interview, Private Carlos Amato says that Baldini had a net stretched outside his tent that contained tinned meals for his men, but claims these cold rations were unappetizing, although he would consume them after getting a fellow conscript to heat them up first but that the NCOs in the platoon had no qualms in eating the cold rations without heating them first. Another former private in the 1st Rifle Platoon, Sergio Juan Delgado, told Silvia Paglioni that he hated his section leader, Corporal Geronimo Remigio Díaz, but admits that the NCO allowed him and four other conscripts to open up and drink several cans of beer that had been helicoptered forward and sunbathe in one rare sunny day. Another former private in the 1st Platoon, Claudio Alberto Carbone claimed that Baldini would always get him to go and look for firewood so that the officer could heat up his food while the remainder of the platoon "starved" and that Baldini "clashed with everyone" and as a result was left to himself and "died alone" in the coming battle, ignoring the fact that Corporal Darío Rolando Ríos had died alongside Baldini attempting to repel the British advance on the western slopes of Mount Longdon and that shortly after their deaths Sergeant Jorge Alberto Ron had been killed and Private Jorge Altieri had badly wounded attempting to get to the aid of Baldini and Ríos.

Sub-Lieutenant Baldini is accused of having handed out rough field punishment to a number of his conscripts for going absent-without-leave (AWOL) in Port Stanley or for being caught having fallen asleep a number of times while on night-time sentry duty in the case of Private Claudio Carbone. "Our own officers were our greatest enemies", says Ernesto Alonso who served as a conscript in Baldini's platoon, and who later became the president of CECIM, an anti-Argentine Military war veterans group founded by Rodolfo Carrizo and former conscripts of the 7th Regiment. "They supplied themselves with whiskey from the pubs, but they weren’t prepared for war. They disappeared when things got serious." Alonso also claims the conscripts on Mount Longdon fought “without any type of leadership by our commanders, the officers and NCOs." Alonso admits he took no part in the fighting for he was evacuated during the daylight hours of 11 June, a victim of shell-shock after a low-level aerial strike on the part of a Royal Air Force GR-3 Harrier fighter-bomber formation on the western slopes of Mount Longdon. The previous day, 10 June, Private Claudio Carbone had also been evacuated after he shot himself in his left thigh while inside his tent as is revealed in the book Two Sides of Hell (Bloomsbury Publishing, 1994). Baldini applied first-aid and allowed the conscript to be taken down the mountain, where a Bell UH-1 Huey helicopter arrived to take the wounded soldier to Stanley Hospital, but not before coming under rifle fire from nervous Argentine sentries on Wireless Ridge that damaged the helicopter. According to former Private Delgado, another soldier in the 1st Platoon (Private Ricardo Daniel Barreto from the anti-tank section) had also shot himself on purpose around this time in order to be taken off the mountain and that several other conscripts had simply vanished and had become deserters like Privates Donato Manuel Gramisci and Gustavo Alberto Hidalgo who were nowhere to be seen except for Gramisci who after 25 days hiding with friends in the Headquarters & Support Company on Wireless Ridge finally decided to return to the 1st Rifle Platoon in order to avoid a court-martial back in Argentina and unfortunately just in time for him to take part and be killed on the freezing mountain on the night of 11–12 June.

British Warrant Officer Nick van der Bijl (who interviewed key Argentine prisoners-of-war), maintains that the conscript defenders on Longdon were helped by their officers and NCOs to make themselves as comfortable as possible under the circumstances and that their platoon commanders, including Baldini and even platoon sergeants, tried hard to bolster morale:

Baldini was later heavily criticized by veterans for being indifferent and selfish toward his men although this seems to have come from several petulant soldiers who failed to appreciate his efforts to keep them alive in difficult conditions.

Sub-Lieutenant Baldini was reported to have handed cups of hot chocolate milk to each of the sodden conscripts from his 1st Rifle Platoon as a reward on Argentine National Day on 25 May 1982 after first getting them to sing the Argentine National Anthem and as an effort to raise morale with Private Claudio Carbone recalling: "Snow had fallen, it was bitterly cold, and it was my turn to relieve my mate on guard duty. I found him collapsed behind a rock. No sooner had I got him round than I, too, fainted. The next day they gave us chocolate. It was the only time I can ever recall being given something sweet."First Sergeant Rolando Mario Spizuoco also refutes the charge that he left the 1st Platoon conscripts to fend for themselves: "I saw to it that they were not cheated of their ratpacks, that they had chocolate bars, balaclavas and the best possible warming-up tents."

In 2016, Victor José Bruno, a former Private 1st Class in the 1st Platoon spoke in defence of Baldini, claiming that the officer would happily share his cigarettes with the smokers in his platoon and that Baldini, although suffering from the onset of a serious case of trench foot, refused to be evacuated preferring to remain beside his men. Former Corporal Carlos Roberto Cascio from the 1st Platoon also defended the conduct of the much-maligned Corporal Dario Rolando Ríos (Killed-In-Action) for although the NCO was suffering from influenza and a bad case of dysentery, Ríos refused immediate evacuation to the aid post on the mountain where the combat medic (Private Jorge Risso) could attend him for he was much needed on the frontlines and died imitating the conduct of his platoon commander on Longdon. In 2024, former Private Darío Miguel Pedraza who along with Private Bruno had received Ranger-type training in 1981 before being posted in the 1st Rifle Platoon spoke extremely well of Baldini describing him as the "Jesus Christ of the mountain" for his willingness to share every little thing he could get his hands on. He also shared a story told to him later by one of Baldini's close friends in the form of a fellow officer cadet from the Argentine Army Academy that while studying, Baldini would live off a fraction of his stipend and give the rest to the officer cadets in his class from the interior provinces struggling to make ends meet so they could afford to go back home to visit their families during Christmas and national holidays.

On 23 May 1982, as A, B and C Companies of the 7th Infantry Regiment had been in their positions out in the open for 41 days with little proper food, the Regimental Adjutant (Captain Raúl Eugenio Daneri) ordered that the rifle companies take turns in preparing and serving the hot food for the 7th Regiment. "It was my turn to be the mess cook; we took turns, I think, weekly. That way I could get a little extra food. Although going out in the cold to serve the others was awful, Roberto Maldonado (my foxhole companion) and I would fill three water canteens with yerba mate tea and use them as hot water bottles—that way we had something warm to drink all morning," says Miguel Savage, a mortarman in C Company.

On the night of 8–9 June, a number of conscript soldiers from the 7th Regiment's A Company deserted their positions on Wireless Ridge and after crossing a river broke into the house of Claude and Judy Molkenbuhr in Murrell Farm and completely vandalized the house, along with valuables. The four deserters involved, Privates Carlos Alberto Hornos, Pedro Vojkovic, Alejandro Vargas and Manuel Zelarayán were killed when their heavily laden wooden boat struck an anti-tank mine on the opposite bank.

On 13 June, in another case involving desertions on the part of Argentine conscripts, Private Juan Carlos González from N Company 5th Marine Battalion on Tumbledown Mountain and Private Mario Ramón Luna from B Company 6th Regiment in reserve positions in the valley between Tumbledown and Wireless Ridge were killed around midday by Argentine Commandos laying in ambush position near Goat Ridge in a friendly-fire incident while these deserters along with others were returning from raiding the abandoned food cache that B Company 6th Regiment that had been forced to leave behind on Two Sisters Mountain while taking up new defensive positions in the early hours of 12 June.When Marine Sub-Lieutenant Carlos Daniel Vázquez discovered that one of his men from 4th Platoon N Company had been instrumental in leading the forbidden expedition to Two Sisters feature that ended in two Argentine deaths, he spared the conscript in question from immediate execution on the spot despite his immense rage but forced the culprit at gunpoint to crawl repeatedly through rotting sheep entrails as a form of rough punishment.

In a 2019 interview with Radio Noticias, former Private Gustavo Alberto Placente from the 181st Military Police Company explained that the harsh field punishments that many in CECIM consider were unwaranted brutal cases of torture, were absolutely necessary to keep the conscript defenders in line and save them from potential harm from not only minefields but also British and friendly-fire but most importantly to protect the lives of local civilians in Port Stanley and keep Argentine soldiers out of the abandoned houses of the Falklanders that had sought safety in the Falklands interior.Captain Miguel Ángel Romano, a reserve officer, had been sent to Port Stanley to help take charge of the 181st Military Police Company during the Argentine occupation. According to Falklander Patrick Watts from Port Stanley: "He took appropriate action against conscripts caught stealing from unoccupied dwellings and tried to help the civilian community as far as his rank would allow."

In 2009, Argentine authorities in Comodoro Rivadavia ratified a decision made by authorities in Río Grande, Tierra del Fuego (which, according to Argentina, have authority over the islands), announcing their intention to charge 70 officers and NCOs with inhumane treatment of conscript soldiers during the war."We have testimony from 23 people about a soldier who was shot to death by a corporal, four other former combatants who starved to death, and at least 15 cases of conscripts who were staked out on the ground", Pablo Vassel, president of the Human Rights Department of the province of Corrientes, told Inter Press Service News Agency.

There was also the unproven case of Private Silvio Katz from the rifle platoon under Sub-Lieutenant Eduardo Sergio Flores Ardoino from B Company 3rd Infantry Regiment who claimed his platoon commander forced Katz to eat his meals while sitting among feces and other filth after he was caught having gone AWOL (Absent Without Leave) under the cover of darkness and hunting for sheep in the middle of the defensive minefields of Sector Bronze facing the sea and guarding against a British seaborne invasion so soon after the death of Private Vicente Pérez from a neighbouring unit in a friendly-fire incident in the same sector.

CECIM also accuses then Sub-Lieutenant Marcelo Alberto Llambías-Pravaz of being a sadistic brute who took great pleasure in torturing the young soldiers that formed part of his 3rd Rifle Platoon from C Company 4th Regiment on Two Sisters Mountain, completely ignoring the fact that retired-major Llambías-Pravaz is held in high regard by the former soldiers that he commanded on Two Sisters and that the young officer only had to intervene once in enforcing strict discipline in his platoon during the first week of June 1982 and that was when it was discovered that two conscripts soldiers had during one night had eaten all the biscuits meant to have lasted a full week and were to be distributed each evening equally among all regardless of rank in the 3rd Platoon and for which the platoon commander had to rapidly intervene and punish in the open both culprits in order to avoid both suffering a very serious beating or even permanent injury or death at the hands of their enraged fellow conscripts in the platoon that saw their selfish act as an ultimate act of betrayal in what was meant to be an individual treat to be enjoyed during evening tea-time or while on sentry duty at night.

The conscript that was supposedly "shot to death by his superiors" according to CECIM, was soon identified as being Marine Private Rito Florencio Portillo from the 1st Marine Anti-Aircraft Battalion, who according to the military surgeon (Major Andino Luis Francisco) that attended his wounds and spoke to him before the unfortunate conscript succumbed to his injuries, was in fact shot in error by a nervous sentry on the night of 4–5 May while Portillo was returning to his tent from nearby latrines. Private Remigio Antonio Fernández from the 5th (Jungle) Infantry Regiment at Port Howard who according to CECIM had been deliberately starved to death by his superiors had in fact sunk into deep depression, refusing to eat and, despite attempts to feed him intravenously, died on 10 June 1982.

The 25th Special (Ranger) Regiment's C Company (under Paratroop-trained First Lieutenant Carlos Daniel Esteban) established outposts at Goose Green and San Carlos, alongside elements of A Company 12th Infantry Regiment with Esteban telling Argentine military historian Isidoro Jorge Ruiz-Moreno that he took good care of his Rangers: “My men were never forced to stay in their wet foxholes except when there was an air raid or when the battle came closer. But before the English landed, I made sure that my troops were warm, safe and well fed.” There were serious claims that false testimonies were used as evidence in accusing the Argentine officers and NCOs of complete abandonment of their men and Vassel had to step down from his post in 2010. Since the 2009 announcement was made, no one in the military or among the retired officers and NCOs has been charged, causing Pablo Vassel in April 2014 to comment:

For over two years we've been waiting for a final say on behalf of the courts ... There are some types of crimes that no state should allow to go unpunished, no matter how much time has passed, such as the crimes of the dictatorship. Last year Germany sentenced a 98-year-old corporal for his role in the concentration camps in one of the Eastern European countries occupied by Nazi Germany. It didn't take into account his age or rank.

In 2016, another high-profile Argentine Falklands War veteran in the form of retired-Colonel Horacio Sánchez Mariño (former 601 Combat Aviation Battalion pilot), in an online newspaper article criticized the anti-Argentine military veterans' group CECIM for accusing the Argentine Army of dereliction of duty, accusing the veterans association of being caranchos (vultures) that lived off the memory of the Argentine dead.
