= Helen Gibson (teacher) =

New Zealand educator

Helen Fannie Gibson
- Born: Helena Fannie Gibson; 14 July 1868; Lyttelton, New Zealand
- Died: 24 July 1938 (aged 70); Christchurch, New Zealand
- Known for: Foundation principal of Rangi Ruru Girls' School
- Relatives: Mary Gibson (sister)

Helena Fannie Gibson (14 July 1868 – 24 July 1938) was a New Zealand educator and the principal of Rangi Ruru Girls' School in Christchurch for its first 50 years.

== Early life ==
Gibson was born in Lyttelton, near Christchurch, in 1868. She was one of ten children of Frederick Gibson and his second wife, Mary. All eight daughters in the family became teachers or school principals - Mary Gibson became the principal of Christchurch Girls' High School, Beatrice became the principal of Nelson College for Girls, and Ethel, Alice, Ruth and Winifred taught at Rangi Ruru School. There were also two brothers, Frederick and Thomas.

== Education ==
Gibson attended Mrs Crosby's private school in Christchurch, followed by Christchurch Girls' High School. She attended lectures at Canterbury College, and painting classes at the Canterbury College School of Art, but did not graduate with a degree.

== Career ==
Gibson's father bought a school run by friends of his, the Greshams, in 1889. Gibson visited the families of the pupils and persuaded almost all of them to remain at the school under the new management of Gibson, her mother and her sister Alice. They renamed the school Miss Gibson's Private School for Girls, and began with 18 pupils. The school was developed as a place for teaching strong Christian values. Cooking and hand sewing were compulsory subjects, and the girls were expected to adhere to high standards of personal grooming and conduct.

The school prospered under Gibson's leadership, growing to around 100 pupils by 1917, and to over 200 by the time of her death in 1938.

Gibson continued to paint throughout her life, and frequently gave gifts of paintings to family and friends. She also taught drawing and painting at the school, and was involved with the Canterbury Society of Arts; she exhibited her art there, and in 1900, she was on the society's council. She also had paintings exhibited at the New Zealand Academy of Fine Arts, the Auckland Society of Arts and the Otago Society of Arts.

Apart from a one-year visit to England in 1906, Gibson ran Rangi Ruru School until her death in 1938. She never officially retired, remaining actively involved in the school.

== Legacy ==
A stained glass window in St. Mary's Church, Christchurch, commemorates Gibson's life and work.

Rangi Ruru School holds 15 paintings by Gibson in its art collection: landscapes in oils and watercolours.
