= Elsie Low =

Scholar, teacher, temperance campaigner

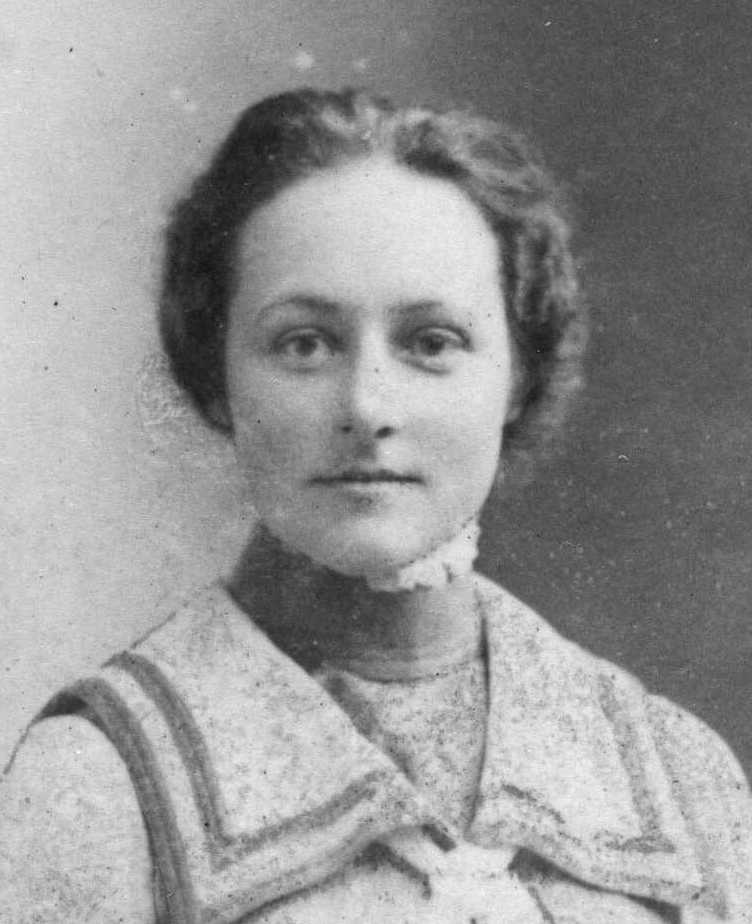
- Elsie Low circa 1905
- Born: 25 July 1875; Horndon on the Hill, Essex, UK
- Died: 14 February 1909 (aged 33); Waimate, Canterbury, New Zealand
- Other name: Elsie Dohrmann
- Spouse: Henry (Heinrich) Dohrmann
- Children: Adelheit Dohrmann
- Scientific career
- Fields: Botany, education, temperance
- Institutions: Christchurch Girls' High School, Napier Girls' High School

Elsie Low (later Dohrmann; 25 July 1875 – 14 February 1909), was a New Zealand botanist, teacher and temperance campaigner.

== Early life and education ==
Low was born in Horndon on the Hill, Essex, England on 25 July 1875. She was the youngest of five children and her parents were Benjamin Low and Sabine Susanna née Harris. Her family owned a general store in Horndon-on-the-Hill until they emigrated to New Zealand in 1876. Benjamin Low became the first schoolmaster in Willowby, near Ashburton. Both Benjamin and Sabine Low enrolled for the basic teaching certificate, and both qualified in 1881, and taught at the Willowby School over the next 21 years.

Low probably attended Willowby School, and in 1888 she won a scholarship to attend the Ashburton High School (now Ashburton College) for three years. She won another three-year scholarship in 1891 to attend Christchurch Girls' High School where she was encouraged by Helen Connon to compete for a scholarship to attend university in 1894. She was successful and started at Canterbury College the same year. Her studies focused on natural sciences, particularly botany.

Low was awarded a Bachelor of Arts in 1897, and then continued with an MA in the department of biology, under Professor Arthur Dendy. Low's research focused on the endemic New Zealand alpine plant Haastia pulvinaris, commonly known as the vegetable sheep. Prior to Low's work, the only published material on the plant was from Hooker's Handbook of New Zealand Flora, published thirty years prior. Low studied the grey-green form of the plant, and prepared a manuscript in 1897. Low described the anatomy of the leaf, stem and root of the plant, and discussed the adaptions required to survive in the extreme environment of an altitude of 5–6,000 feet.

At this point in New Zealand, university papers were still sent to Europe for examination. Low's paper was lost en route, when the steamship Mataura was wrecked in the Strait of Magellan. After the loss of her examination papers, Low was offered a second-class honours degree in English, French, botany and biology. She declined, and instead took up a post teaching for a year at Waimate District High School. Low then retook the examinations and rewrote her botanical work to be read in 1899, but in the meantime the leaf structure of Haastia pulvinaris was described by another paper. It is possible this other publication led to Low receiving first-class honours in English and French but only second-class honours in botany.

== Later life and career ==
In 1899, Low published her paper on Haastia in the scientific journal Transactions and Proceedings of the Royal Society of New Zealand. It was also read by Arthur Dendy in front of the Canterbury Philosophical Institute.

In 1899, Low taught at both Napier Girls' High School and then moved to Christchurch Girls' High School where she taught for three years. Low married Henry Dohrmann, a farmer from Christchurch, on 3 June 1903, and gave up teaching as was customary at the time. They had a daughter, Adelheit Susanna Dohrmann, in 1905.

After her marriage, Low was a prominent figure in the temperance movement. She was president of the Waimate branch of the Women's Christian Temperance Union from 1906 until her death. She was also the national treasurer between 1906 and 1907, the national corresponding secretary between 1907 and 1908 and the superintendent of the union's Department of Non-Alcoholic Medication which protested doctors prescribing alcohol for medicinal purposes. Low was also involved in the campaign against gambling. She wrote an unsigned column on temperance in the Waimate Times for several years and spoke at many public meetings.

Low had suffered from rheumatic fever as a child, leaving her with damage to her heart, and her education and teaching career were both interrupted by the resulting illness. She died on 14 February 1909, aged 33, in Waimate. Her friends and colleagues recalled her as lively and fun-loving.

== Legacy ==
A brass plaque at Christchurch Girls' High School commemorates Low's time there as a pupil and staff member. In 2017, Low was selected as of the Royal Society Te Apārangi's 150 women in 150 words, celebrating the contributions of women to knowledge in New Zealand.

== Published work ==
- Elsie Low (1900). "On the vegetative organs of Haastia pulvinaris". Transactions and Proceedings of the New Zealand Institute. 32: 150–157. ISSN 1176-6158. Wikidata Q104908127.
