= Millicent Baxter =

Scottish-New Zealand peace activist and pacifist

- Born: 8 January 1888; Christchurch, New Zealand
- Died: 3 July 1984 (aged 96); Dunedin, New Zealand
- Education: University of Sydney and Newnham College, Cambridge, England
- Known for: peace activist and pacifist
- Spouse: Archibald Baxter (m. 1921, d. 1970)
- Children: James K. Baxter
- Parent(s): Helen Connon and John Macmillan Brown
- Relatives: Viola Macmillan Brown (sister); John Baxter (grandson)

Millicent Amiel Baxter (8 January 1888 – 3 July 1984) was a New Zealand peace activist and pacifist.

== Early life ==
Baxter was the eldest daughter of John Macmillan Brown, one of the founding professors of Canterbury University College, Christchurch, and Helen Connon, the principal of Christchurch Girls' High School and first woman graduate with honours in the British Empire. Baxter and her sister Viola grew up in a large Fendalton mansion with a governess and lessons from her mother.

After her mother died in 1903, Baxter went to live with relatives in Sydney and was educated there at the Presbyterian Ladies' College and at the University of Sydney, graduating with a B.A. in Latin, French and German in 1908.

== Adult life ==
In 1909, Baxter and her father travelled to England and Europe together. After his return to New Zealand, she entered Newnham College, Cambridge, to study languages, and then went on to Germany to study German and old French. She returned to New Zealand as the First World War was breaking out, and undertook war work for the New Zealand Red Cross and the Lady Liverpool Fund. In mid-1918, a friend showed her a letter written by Archibald Baxter to his parents, describing the punishments he was suffering in France as a conscientious objector. Baxter said of this letter "it altered my whole outlook on politics and on everything in life."

In 1920, Baxter was offered work at Wellington Girls' College, however her father insisted that she move to Dunedin with him instead. She went, and when Macmillan Brown went away travelling, Baxter taught in his place. While in Otago, Baxter sought out Archibald at his family home in Brighton – they fell in love and were married on 12 February 1921, despite strong opposition from Macmillan Brown at the wide disparity in their backgrounds. The couple bought a farm at Kuri Bush, and farmed there for the next nine years. The Baxters had two sons, Terence in 1922 and Jim in 1926. Jim grew up to become one of New Zealand's foremost poets, James K. Baxter.

For the rest of her life, Baxter was involved with pacifism campaigns. In 1931, she and Archie established the Dunedin Branch of the No More War Movement, which aimed to end conscription and encourage disarmament. In the late 1930s the family travelled to Europe and attended the War Resisters' International Conference in Copenhagen, meeting many more pacifists there. Back in New Zealand, conscription was introduced in 1941 and Baxter was a strong supporter of the conscientious objectors, attending their hearings and lobbying Members of Parliament (MPs) and officials for adequate conditions for their detainment. Her son Terence was detained from 1941 to 1945 as an objector, but James was too young to be conscripted.

In the 1950s, Baxter's interests moved to nuclear disarmament. She joined the United Nations Association of New Zealand, Amnesty International, and the peace organisation Voice of Women. Also in the 1950s, Baxter returned to her childhood love of botany and nature, nurtured by her parents on "educational tours" both within New Zealand and abroad. She joined the Dunedin Naturalists' Field Club and organised their field trips, developed her own garden and on a trip to Dunstan with Archie, found a new species of plant – Gingidium baxterii.

== Later life ==
Archie died in 1970, and Baxter sold their house at Brighton and moved to Kaikorai Valley, in Dunedin. In 1981, she published her autobiography, The Memoirs of Millicent Baxter. Baxter was hospitalised for a broken hip in 1983 and died in 1984.

In November 2015, Penny Griffith's biography of Baxter's life was published, "Out of the Shadows: The life of Millicent Baxter".
