= Viola Macmillan Brown =

New Zealand artist (1897 – 1981)

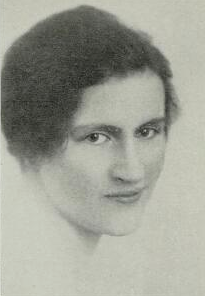
- Born: 1897; Christchurch, New Zealand
- Died: 1981 (aged 83–84)
- Education: Slade School of Fine Art
- Movement: Modernism

Viola Helen Macmillan Brown (16 November 1897 – 1981) was an artist from Christchurch, New Zealand.

== Early life ==
Macmillan Brown was the younger of two daughters of John Macmillan Brown, one of the founding professors of Canterbury University College, Christchurch, and Helen Connon, the principal of Christchurch Girls' High School and first woman graduate with honours in the British Empire. She and her sister Millicent initially lived in a large Fendalton mansion. They were taught by a governess and also had lessons from their mother. However, when Macmillan Brown was five years old her mother died suddenly, and as a result, the girls were raised by their governess. Their father moved the family home to the hill suburb of Cashmere and, apart from her time spent overseas, Macmillan Brown lived there with him until his death.

== Education ==
Around 1915, Macmillan Brown began studying at the Canterbury College School of Art, and four years later moved to Sydney to study at the Julian Ashton Art School.

Around 1922, Macmillan Brown went to England and studied art at the Slade School of Fine Art and the Heatherley School of Fine Art in London. She also travelled to Italy and spent a year in Florence.

== Career ==
Around 1927, Macmillan Brown was a founding member of a group of Canterbury artists known as The Group. These were artists who wanted to move away from the traditions of the art world, and start a modernist movement. She exhibited and worked with The Group until 1936, when she left New Zealand.

Her work was included in a 1947 retrospective exhibition by The Group.

Macmillan Brown was a lifelong friend of the writer Ngaio Marsh (both grew up in the suburb of Cashmere). A sketch of Marsh by Macmillan Brown is held at the Macmillan Brown Library at the University of Canterbury, and an oil painting at the Ngaio Marsh House.

== Personal life ==
After her father's death in 1935, Macmillan Brown left New Zealand and went to England to marry Antonio Notariello. Notariello was an Italian opera singer and although the pair had known each other for some years (Notariello had lived in Christchurch from 1923 to 1926), Macmillan Brown's father had not approved of a marriage between them.

The couple married in Bournemouth, England, in November 1936. They had two daughters, Antonietta and Felicity. Antonietta is a professor of piano at the Royal Academy of Music in London, and Felicity is a concert violinist. Notariello died in 1975.
