= Annabel Ritchie =

New Zealand rower and lawyer (born 1978)

Personal information
- Born: 20 July 1978 (age 47)
- Education: Rangi Ruru Girls' School; University of Wellington
- Occupation: Lawyer

Annabel Ritchie (born 20 July 1978) is a retired rower from New Zealand.

== Private life ==
Ritchie was born in New Zealand and attended Rangi Ruru Girls' School in Christchurch from 1994 to 1996. She studied at Victoria University of Wellington and graduated LLB. She lived in Queenstown where she worked as a lawyer in private practice.

== Rowing career ==
Ritchie made the New Zealand U19 coxless four to compete at the 1996 World Rowing Junior Championships in Motherwell, Scotland, where the Jude Hamilton-coached crew won a bronze medal. At the 1998 World Rowing Championships in Cologne, Germany, she came seventh with the women's eight. At the next World Rowing Championships a year later in St. Catharines, Ontario, Canada, she came eighth with the women's eight.

She attended the University of Washington, USA, and was part of the crew which won back-to-back National Collegiate Athletic Association (NCAA) championship titles. Her Husky team included Athens Olympic silver medallists and Beijing and London gold medallists Mary Murray (née Whipple) and Anna Cummins (née Mickelson) (USA), and Olympians Rika Geyser (South Africa) and Nicole Borges (Canada).

In 2012 to 2014, she was a rowing coach for the Wakatipu club in Queenstown.
