= Catherine Alexander (botanist) =

New Zealand botanist

- Born: 8 December 1862; Kaiapoi, New Zealand
- Died: 17 March 1928 (aged 65); Christchurch, New Zealand
- Education: Canterbury College
- Notable work: "Observations on the Glands in the Leaf and Stem of Myoporum lætum, Forster"
- Scientific career
- Fields: botany
- Workplaces: Christchurch Girls' High School

Catherine Alexander (married name Rowe; 8 December 1862 – 17 March 1928) was a New Zealand botanist, and the first known woman to publish a paper in the Royal Society Te Apārangi's Transactions in 1886.

== Early life and education ==
Alexander was born in Kaiapoi in December 1862, to George and Mary Ann Alexander, née Hatch. George Alexander was a baker. She received her education at the day school belonging to St Luke's Church in Christchurch. She studied at Canterbury College from 1882, concentrating on English (taught by John MacMillan Brown) and botany (taught at that time by Frederick Wollaston Hutton). She received an Exhibition Scholarship towards her botany honours degree work. She graduated with a Bachelor of Arts with first-class honours in botany and second-class honors in English in 1885 and then worked at Christchurch Girls' High School as an assistant teacher until her marriage.

== Scientific work ==
Her paper on ngaio (a small New Zealand native tree), "Observations on the Glands in the Leaf and Stem of Myoporum lætum, Forster" appeared in the Royal Society's Transactions and Proceedings of the New Zealand Institute. Three more papers, all by women -- Annette Wilson, Miss Morrison, and Katherine Browning -- followed in 1892. By the time her paper was read before the Wellington Philosophical Society in 1886, Alexander was teaching at high school.

== Later life ==
In August 1886, Alexander married Thomas Rowe in Addington, Christchurch, a teacher. Francis Haslam, one of Alexander's professors at Canterbury College, witnessed the ceremony. They had four children and lost one son in WWI. Rowe was principal of Rangiora High School, and Alexander was assistant mistress, taking charge of the younger pupils, for a time. In 1893, Rowe was appointed as the first librarian in the Wellington City Library, but by 1904 the family had returned to Christchurch. Her husband died suddenly on 1 February 1928. Having never recovered from the shock of her husband's death, she died six weeks later on 17 March. They are both buried at Christchurch's Linwood Cemetery.

== Awards and honours ==
In 2017, Alexander was selected as one of the Royal Society Te Apārangi's "150 women in 150 words", celebrating the contribution of women to knowledge in New Zealand.

== Publication ==
- Observations on the Glands in the Leaf and Stem of Myoporum lætum, Forster Transactions and Proceedings of the New Zealand Institute 1886 19: 314–316
