= Joyce Watson (chemist) =

New Zealand chemist (1918–2015)

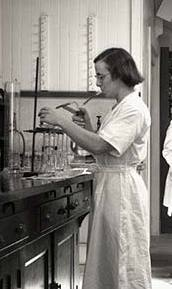
- Watson at the Cawthron Institute in c. 1949
- Born: 5 July 1918; Nelson, New Zealand
- Died: 28 September 2004 (aged 86); Nelson, New Zealand
- Education: University of Canterbury
- Awards: FNZIC
- Scientific career
- Fields: trace elements in crops, fruit disorders
- Workplaces: Cawthron Institute
- Thesis: A phase rule investigation of the three component system BaO – (CH3CO)2O – H2O at 25 degrees C., and 35 degrees C (1940)

Joyce Watson FNZIC (5 July 1918 – 28 September 2004) was a New Zealand chemist specialising in fruit disorders and trace elements.

== Academic career ==
Watson was born in Nelson in 1918, the daughter of Helen "Nellie" Knaggs Watson (1883–1956; née Clark) and Francis George Watson (1887–1957). She received her education at Christchurch Girls' High School. After a BSc in 1939, Watson completed an MSc titled A phase rule investigation of the three component system BaO–(CH_{3}CO)_{2}O–H_{2}O at 25°C and 35°C in 1940 at Canterbury College, then part of the University of New Zealand. She then moved to the Cawthron Institute in 1941, where she was employed as an assistant pasture chemist.

Watson's research began with investigating the disorders of fruit caused by trace element deficiencies, and progressed into tomatoes, pasture, hops, flax and tobacco. Watson's work on the fruit disorder bitter pit led to the discovery that the cause is calcium deficiency. Calcium sprays are still used to prevent the disorder.

When takahē were rediscovered in 1948, Watson was tasked by the Wildlife Service with analysing the tussock to assist with captive rearing and to discover whether the application of fertiliser might improve bird health. The work may have led to the application of nitrogen and phosphorus to the tussock.

Watson died on 28 September 2004 at the Omaio Village Rest Home in Nelson.

== Recognition ==
In 1971 Watson was made a Fellow of the New Zealand Institute of Chemistry, an honour bestowed on only three other women by that point.

In 2017, Watson was selected as one of the Royal Society Te Apārangi's 150 women in 150 words.

== Selected works ==
- Joyce Watson; Henry Oscar Askew (December 1956). "Molybdenum Deficiency in Hops". Nature. 178 (4545): 1302–1303. doi:10.1038/1781302a0. ISSN 1476-4687. Wikidata Q58932695.
- Henry Oscar Askew; E. Chittenden; Joyce Watson; A.J. Waters (December 1958). "Influence of applications of sodium molybdate and ground limestone on a newly sown pasture". New Zealand Journal of Agricultural Research. 1 (6): 874–895. doi:10.1080/00288233.1958.10422391. ISSN 0028-8233. Wikidata Q104626663.
- H. O. Askew; E. T. Chittenden; R. J. Monk; Joyce Watson (February 1960). "Chemical investigations on bitter pit of apples: II. The effect of supplementary mineral sprays on incidence of pitting and on chemical composition of Cox's orange fruit and leaves". New Zealand Journal of Agricultural Research. 3 (1): 141–168. doi:10.1080/00288233.1960.10419868. ISSN 0028-8233. Wikidata Q104626628.
- H. O. Askew; E. T. Chittenden; R. J. Monk; Joyce Watson (February 1960). "Chemical investigations on bitter pit of apples: III. Chemical composition of affected and neighbouring healthy tissues". New Zealand Journal of Agricultural Research. 3 (1): 169–178. doi:10.1080/00288233.1960.10419869. ISSN 0028-8233. Wikidata Q104626614.
- H. O. Askew; R. J. Monk; Joyce Watson (October 1958). "Physical and chemical changes in the developing hop cone". New Zealand Journal of Agricultural Research. 1 (5): 757–777. doi:10.1080/00288233.1958.10431582. ISSN 0028-8233. Wikidata Q104626664.
- E. T. Chittenden; D. J. Stanton; J. Watson (February 1969). "Bitter pit in Cox's Orange apples". New Zealand Journal of Agricultural Research. 12 (1): 240–247. doi:10.1080/00288233.1969.10427092. ISSN 0028-8233. Wikidata Q104626705.
- E. T. Chittenden; D. J. Stanton; J. Watson (March 1973). "Calcium sprays for control of bitter pit and other disorders in apples". New Zealand Journal of Crop and Horticultural Science. 1 (1): 85–91. doi:10.1080/03015521.1973.10427623. ISSN 0114-0671. Wikidata Q104626708.
- T. Rigg; Watson, J. (1945). "Phormium tenax manurial and cultural experiments at Westport". New Zealand Journal of Science and Technology. 27: 336–342. ISSN 0375-0140. Wikidata Q104626728.
