= Gay Davidson =

New Zealand-born Australian journalist

Miringa Gay Davidson (née Yandle; 14 February 1939 – 22 November 2004) was a New Zealand journalist known for her career in Australia. She was a senior writer for The Canberra Times and headed the Canberra Press Gallery and National Press Club as the first female political correspondent for a major Australian newspaper.

== Early life ==
Davidson was born on 14 February 1939 in Christchurch, New Zealand. She was the daughter of Abina (née Hegarty) and Geoffrey Yandle; her mother was born in Ireland and her father in England. She was educated at the Community of the Sacred Name School and Christchurch Girls' High School, subsequently spending two years at Canterbury University College.

== Career ==
Davidson completed a journalism cadetship at The Press in Christchurch and gained experience in print, radio and television journalism. She moved to Australia in 1967 when her first husband won a scholarship to the Australian National University, and subsequently began working for The Canberra Times, eventually as leader writer and senior columnist. She was the first woman to work as political correspondent for a major Australian newspaper and subsequently became the first woman president of the Canberra Press Gallery. As president of the National Press Club she helped restore the club's financial position and secure a permanent premises for the organisation.

In 1987, Davidson left the press to work for public relations firm Hill+Knowlton Strategies. She resigned in 1991 and later worked on a contract basis for the Department of Health. She was also a board member of various community organisations, including Canberra Hospital, the ACT Land and Planning Appeals Board, the Bruce Stadium Trust, and the Australian Institute of Health. Davidson was deputy chair of the Australian Institute of Political Science for a number of years and was made a life member in 1999. She was posthumously inducted into the Australian Media Hall of Fame in 2018.

== Personal life ==
Davidson married twice, firstly to Naylor Hillary and secondly to Ken Davidson. Her daughter Kiri died of subacute sclerosing panencephalitis in 1984 at the age of thirteen. She subsequently worked to promote the Bicentennial Measles Campaign to encourage immunisation of children against measles.

Davidson died in Canberra on 22 November 2004, aged 65.
