= Viran Molisa Trief =

Ni-Vanuatu jurist

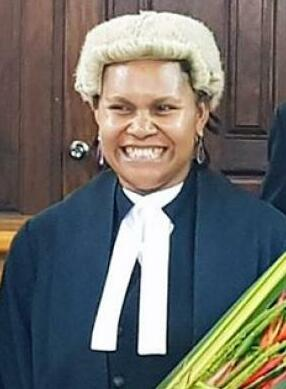
- Trief at her swearing-in ceremony (2019)

Justice of the Supreme Court of Vanuatu
- Incumbent
- Assumed office July 2019
- Appointed by: Tallis Obed Moses

Personal details
- Parents: Sela Molisa (father); Grace Mera Molisa (mother)
- Education: Victoria University of Wellington; Australia National University

Viran Molisa Trief (born 1977) is a Ni-Vanuatu jurist who has been a member of the Supreme Court of Vanuatu since July 2019; she was the first Ni-Vanuatu woman to hold that role. She previously served as Solicitor General, and was the first woman to hold that role.

== Early life and education ==
Trief is the daughter of Grace Mera Molisa and Sela Molisa, who were both instrumental in the founding of the Republic of Vanuatu in 1980. She is the eldest of three children; her brother Pala is a lecturer at Victoria University's Business School. They grew up in Port Vila, but went to New Zealand for their secondary education. Trief went to Nelson College for Girls, before graduating from Victoria University of Wellington with a Bachelor of Laws with honours in 2001. She also has a Bachelor of Tourism Services Management. She graduated with a Master of Public Policy from the Australian National University in 2011, winning the Raymond Apthorpe Master Degree Prize for the best overall result in the degree.

== Career ==
Trief worked at the State Law office as a researcher. She became a State Counsel in 2003 and Assistant Senior State Counsel in 2004. She was program coordinator of the Vanuatu Australian Policing and Justice Program. She was appointed Solicitor General in March 2009. She also served as Secretary of the Law Council and Disciplinary Committee until her appointment to the Court.

Trief was appointed to the Supreme Court by President Tallis Obed Moses in May 2019 and sworn-in in July. She was one of ten local and international applicants for the position. She is the first Ni-Vanuatu woman to be appointed a Judge of the Supreme Court of the Republic of Vanuatu.

== Personal life ==
Trief is married with three children.
