= Archibald Baxter =

New Zealand socialist, pacifist and conscientious objector

- Born: Archibald McColl Learmond Baxter; 13 December 1881; Saddle Hill, Otago, New Zealand
- Died: 10 August 1970 (aged 88); Dunedin, New Zealand
- Education: Primary
- Occupation: Farmer
- Known for: Pacifist, socialist and conscientious objector
- Notable work: We Will Not Cease
- Movement: No More War and Peace Pledge Union
- Spouse: Millicent Baxter (m. 1921, d. 1984)
- Children: Terence and James Keir
- Parent(s): John Baxter and Mary McColl

Archibald McColl Learmond Baxter (13 December 1881 – 10 August 1970) was a New Zealand socialist, pacifist and conscientious objector.

== Early life ==
Baxter was born at Saddle Hill, Otago, on 13 December 1881, to John Baxter and Mary McColl. He was one of eight children. His father had migrated to New Zealand from Scotland in 1861. Leaving school at 12, Baxter worked on a farm and became head ploughman at Gladbrook Station.

During the 1899–1902 Second Boer War New Zealand sent troops to help the British. Baxter considered enlisting, but heard a Dunedin lawyer, possibly Alfred Richard Barclay, speak about pacifism before he did so and decided against enlisting. He read pacifist and anti-military literature, forming a Christian Socialist view. Baxter also heard British Labour Party leader Keir Hardie speak during his 1908 visit to New Zealand and concluded that war would not solve problems. He convinced six of his seven brothers that war was wrong.

== World War I ==
=== Conscription ===
With the introduction of conscription under the Military Service Act 1916, Baxter and his brothers refused to register on the grounds that

all war is wrong, futile, and destructive alike to victor and vanquished.

The Act did not recognise their stand, as the only grounds for a man to claim conscientious objection were:

That he was on the fourth day of August, nineteen hundred and fourteen, and has since continuously been a member of a religious body the tenets and doctrines of which religious body declare the bearing of arms and the performance of any combatant service to be contrary to Divine revelation, and also that according to his own conscientious religious belief the bearing of arms and the performance of any combatant service is unlawful by reason of being contrary to Divine revelation.

This was a considerable contraction of the exemption allowed under the Defence Amendment Act 1912, which had provided under Section 65(2)

On the application of any person a Magistrate may grant to the applicant a certificate of exemption from military training and service if the Magistrate is satisfied that the applicant objects in good faith to such training and service on the ground that it is contrary to his religious belief.

The 1916 Act meant that only Christadelphians, Seventh-day Adventists, and Quakers were to be recognised as conscientious objectors. As Baxter was not a member of one of these, he could not apply for objector status. According to the Act, Baxter was automatically deemed to be a First Division Reservist. The Act also required all eligible males to enroll in the Expeditionary Force Reserve or face up to 3 months imprisonment or a fine of £50. Baxter had not enrolled. Failing to enroll and being convicted of it also meant that Baxter could be immediately called up for service. Failure to report for duty became either desertion or absence without leave, offences under the Army Act.

Baxter and two of his brothers – Alexander and John – were arrested by civilian police in mid March 1917 for failing to enroll under the Act and were first imprisoned in the Terrace Gaol, Wellington. They were subsequently transferred directly to Trentham Military Camp when their appeals as conscientious objectors were rejected. On 21 March Archibald and John Baxter and William Little, another objector, refused to put on Army uniform; Alexander Baxter refused to work. All were court martialed, all stating that they did not consider themselves soldiers, having never volunteered or taken the oath of allegiance. None was represented by legal counsel. The four were sentenced to 84 days imprisonment with hard labour, served at both the Terrace Gaol and Mount Cook Prison. At the end of their sentence they were to be sent back to Trentham Camp. Back at Trentham after release, Archibald Baxter continued to refuse orders and was sentenced to 28 days detention.

=== Deportation to the front ===
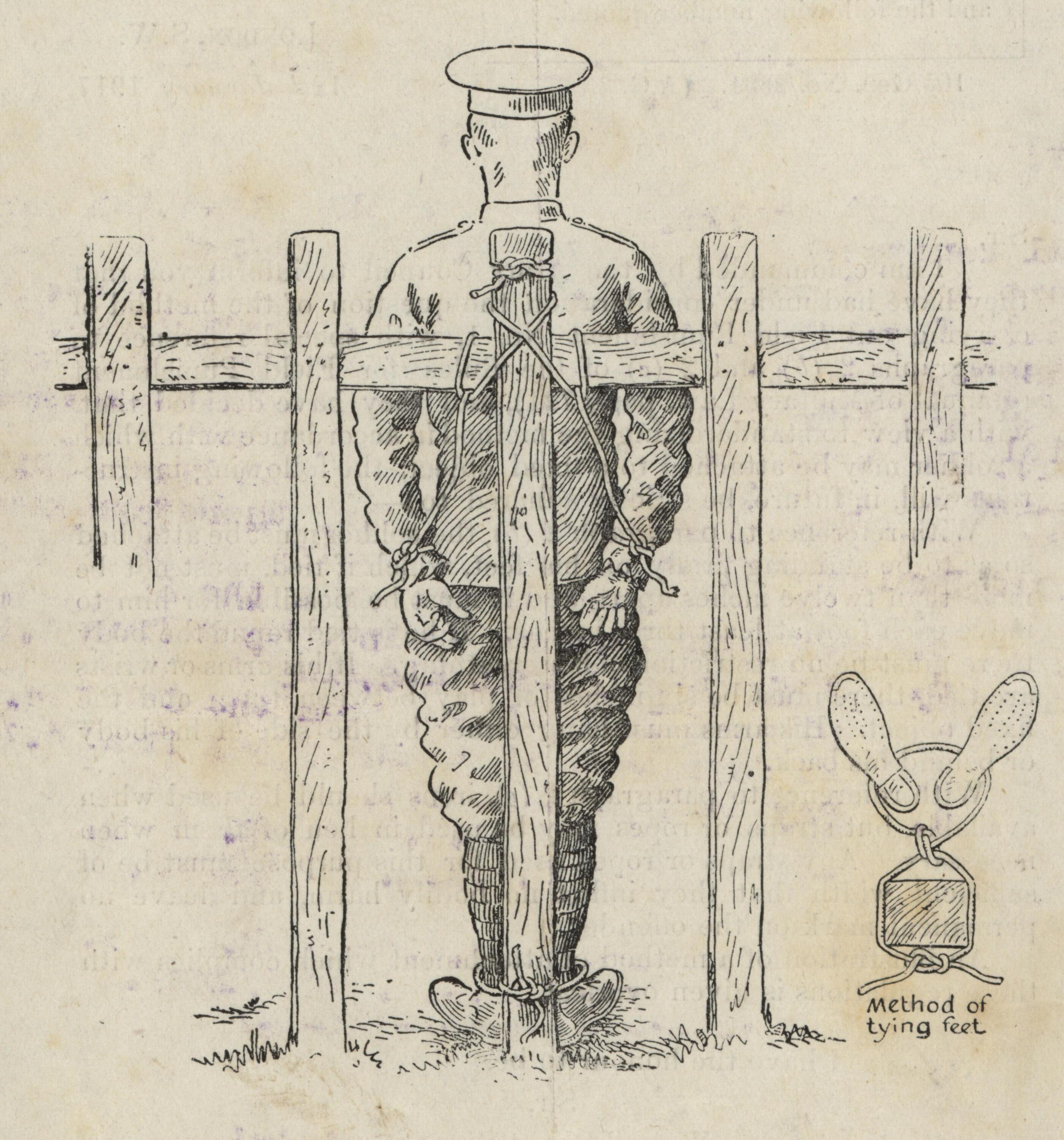
Contemporary illustration of Field Punishment Number One.

In 1917 the Minister of Defence, Sir James Allen, decided that all men claiming to be conscientious objectors but not accepted as such should be sent to the Western Front. Accordingly, orders were given by Colonel H R Potter, Trentham Camp Commandant, that he along with 13 other conscientious objectors – his two brothers, William Little (Hikurangi), Frederick Adin (Foxton), Garth Carsley Ballantyne (Wellington), Mark Briggs (politician), David Robert Gray (Hinds. Canterbury), Thomas Percy Harland (Roslyn, Dunedin), Lawrence Joseph Kirwan (Hokitika), Daniel Maguire (Foxton), Lewis Edward Penwright (Geeverton, Tasmania), Henry Patton (Cobden Greymouth) and Albert Ernest Sanderson (Babylori, North Wairoa) – were to be shipped out. On 24 July they were embarked on the troopship Waitemata en voyage to Cape Town, where a measles epidemic on board caused the ship to stop. Archibald, Jack and Sanderson and some troops were taken to hospital, and the ship was condemned by the port authorities as unfit for troops, necessitating the civilian liner Norman Castle being used to take the main military group, including the other COs, to England.

After recovery, Archibald and the other two COs were taken on the civilian liner Llanstephan Castle, arriving at Plymouth, Devon, on 26 December. Baxter was still refusing to put on a uniform or do any work for the army. He was kept under detention at Sling Camp, Salisbury Plain, and then sent to France, Folkestone–Boulogne, and on to Étaples. British newspapers of the time reported that because he had been sent to the front he could be shot for disobeying orders.

There Baxter remained under detention and continued to refuse any military involvement. He had been assigned to E Company of the 28th Reinforcements, led by Captain Frederick Harold Batten, father of the aviator Jean Batten. He was placed under Lt Col George Mitchell, 3rd Otago Reserve Battalion, who investigated his case, questioning him about his beliefs, but ultimately finding that he was considered a soldier by the New Zealand Government. Mitchell told Baxter that if he did not obey military orders he should expect to be punished, as determined by Mitchell. Eventually Mitchell punished Baxter with 28 days of Field Punishment No.1 at Ouderdom (near Ypres in Belgium).

A doctor examined Baxter before the punishment, and despite telling Baxter he thought he was unfit for it, spitefully passed him as fit. Because the personnel at Ouderdom would not punish him, he was moved to Mud Farm near Dickebusch (also known as Dikkebus) in West Flanders, where he was put under two hours punishment each day. Eventually he was sent to Abeele and back to Mitchell. On 5 March Mitchell ordered him up to the lines at Ypres. Provost Sergeant Booth was put in charge of Baxter and at one time punched him in the face and beat him up, Booth saying he had been ordered to do so. Baxter was placed under Captain Phillips and taken to the Otago Infantry Regiment camp. He was then returned to Booth's supervision.

At one stage Booth, on direction from a Captain Stevenson, placed Baxter by an ammunition dump being shelled by the Germans. Despite a heavy barrage, Baxter was unharmed. After further abusive treatment including starvation, he suffered a complete physical and mental breakdown, and was sent to hospital in England about May 1918. According to his records, by the time he went to hospital he had been assigned to the 3rd New Zealand Entrenching Battalion.

Baxter was said to have been diagnosed as suffering from melancholia. He was returned to New Zealand, but during the voyage was diagnosed as being in good mental and physical health. He arrived on 21 September 1918, and returned to his Otago farm after the war.

The physical treatment given to Baxter can to a large extent be directly attributed to the attitudes of the Minister of Defence, Allen; the Commander of New Zealand forces based in England, Brigadiar-General Sir George Richardson, and General Godley, Commander of the New Zealand Expeditionary Forces. Godley gave orders that if Baxter and the others failed to comply, they were to be "summarily punished or dealt with at reinforcement camps, where they are now, and that they are not to be sent up to the front." Neither Allen nor Richardson had any such qualms and were likely to be the reason behind Baxter being taken to the front.

=== Reaction in New Zealand and England ===
Concern about the fate of Baxter and the others sent to France began to be raised by the Dunedin branch of the Women's International League. The Canterbury Women's Institute also wrote expressing concern. In late 1917 English Quaker and wife of the late John Ellis, Maria Rountree, wrote about trying to find the fate of the 14 objectors, only to be stonewalled by the Commander of the New Zealand forces, Richardson. Harry Holland MP, citing an article in the Dominion on 21 November, deduced that the British Government had condemned the New Zealand government's sending of conscientious objectors to the front. The paper had written, "the Imperial authorities have no wish to be troubled with men who will not fight,..". This effectively ended such deportations, but did not mean the release of those already in France.

In February 1918 the National Peace Council of New Zealand wrote to the Minister of Defence, James Allen, expressing concern about the treatment of Baxter and the others. Of particular concern was the sending of the objectors to the front, where they could be court-martialled and shot for not fighting the enemy. Harry Holland MP also took up their cases, writing to the Prime Minister and newspapers.

As further news came of the inhumane way Baxter had been treated by the military, it was the subject of a Women's International League delegation to the Acting Prime Minister and Minister of Defence, Sir James Allen, in June 1918. The treatment of both him and the other objectors continued to be raised after the war by Harry Holland MP and others. In 2014 a docu-drama of his treatment entitled Field Punishment No 1 was televised.

The attitude of the military of the day towards Baxter was summed up in a letter from Colonel Robert Tate, Adjutant-General, New Zealand Military Headquarters, in which he stated

Regarding Archibald Baxter ... the sympathy of many earnest people who would like to see the lot of the conscientious objector alleviated, is wasted on men [Baxter] who are in no sense conscientious but are merely defiant of all control and willing to be subject to no law but their own inclinations. ...

== Inter-war period ==
On 12 February 1921 Archibald married Millicent Amiel Macmillan Brown, daughter of Helen Connon, and Professor John Macmillan Brown, founding chair of Canterbury College. Brown opposed the marriage due to the disparity in the couple's backgrounds – Millicent, educated overseas, and Archie, who had received only a primary education. Millicent, in her autobiography, stated that she had heard of Baxter in 1918 and became a pacifist a short time later.

During the 1920s the Baxters farmed at Brighton and had two sons, Terence (born 1922) and James Keir (born 1926). James' middle name was chosen in honour of Keir Hardie, a founder of the Labour Party in Britain, who notably spoke against war at a rally in London on 2 August 1914, two days before Britain (and New Zealand) declared war. James grew up to become one of New Zealand's most famous poets (known as James K. Baxter), and both sons became pacifists.

With Millicent's support, he founded the Dunedin Branch of the New Zealand No More War Movement in 1931. The movement sought to end conscription and promote disarmament. His father-in-law died in the 1930s and the Baxters inherited enough from his estate to enable them to travel. They moved to Wanganui, then went to Salisbury, England in 1937. Baxter addressed the 5th War Resisters' International conference (the last before World War II) in Copenhagen, 23–26 July 1937. While living at Salisbury he wrote his account of his World War I experiences, published as We Will Not Cease in 1939. The family returned to New Zealand in 1938.

== World War II ==
Both of Baxter's sons followed their parents' pacifism. His elder son, Terence, was imprisoned for refusing conscription during World War II. The National Service Emergency Regulations 1940, under which he was called up, were almost as limiting on the grounds for conscientious objection as the 1916 Act. Regulation 21 (2) required the person objecting to prove they held ".. a genuine belief that it is wrong to engage in warfare in any circumstances." The regulation further stated that "Evidence of active and genuine membership of a pacifist religious body may in general be accepted as evidence of the convictions of the objector..." Active and continuous membership of the Society of Friends or Christadelphians prior to the outbreak of war was taken as sufficient proof. The Appeal Boards set up under the regulations tended to take a very narrow and sometimes contradictory view of conscientious objectors. After an April 1941 British court case those deemed to be politically based were unlikely to be accepted. The continuation of conscription must have been ironic for Baxter as many members of the now governing Labour Party had been imprisoned during World War I for opposing conscription. The prime minister, Michael Joseph Savage, had been very vocal opposing conscription during that war.

During the war Baxter was an active member of the Dunedin Branch of the New Zealand Peace Pledge Union.

== Later years ==
After the war the Baxters continued their involvement with the peace movement. They lobbied against nuclear weapons, supported Amnesty International, and wrote against the Vietnam War, about which in 1968 Archibald said:

…the only apparent justification that war ever had was that by destroying some lives it might clumsily preserve others. But now even that justification is being stripped away. We make war chiefly on civilians and respect for human life seems to have become a thing of the past. To accept this situation would be to accept the Devil's philosophy.

During the 1950s–60s the Baxters also took a keen interest in botany, discovering on a trip to Dunstan a new plant species now known as Gingidia baxterae.

In 1965, Baxter's younger son James convinced both Archibald and Millicent to become Roman Catholics.

Baxter lived in Dunedin until his death on 10 August 1970.

== Archibald Baxter Memorial Trust ==
In 2013 a group in Dunedin, chaired by Kevin P. Clements of the University of Otago National Centre for Peace and Conflict Studies, set up the Archibald Baxter Memorial Trust to honour Baxter and other conscientious objectors of the First World War. Ian Fraser is the trust's patron, and trustees include Baxter's granddaughter Katherine Baxter.

The Trust proposed an annual lecture in Baxter's name, an annual essay competition commencing in August 2014, and a memorial in Dunedin in Baxter's honour. The first lecture was given on 22 September 2014 by Australian historian and author Professor Henry Reynolds of the University of Tasmania. His lecture was titled Discovering Archibald Baxter and the thoughts on war which followed. The topic for the Trust's first essay competition was They also served who would not fight and was to be set against a backdrop of New Zealand History. There were two age group categories: Junior (New Zealand school years 9–11) and Senior (New Zealand school years 12–13). The senior section was won by Modi Deng of Columba College and the Junior section by Rhys Davie of Tokomairiro High School.

More than $100,000 were raised through grants and donations for what is the first memorial to honour pacifism in New Zealand. The Trust hoped to unveil the memorial on the centenary of the Battle of Passchendaele in 2017, however resource consent was not granted until July 2018. Construction of the memorial, which was estimated to cost $300,000, commenced in April 2021 at a site on the corner of George and Albany Streets, Dunedin and was officially opened on 29 October 2021.

== Literature, theatre and film ==
- Field Punishment Number One, David Grant, paintings by Bob Kerr, Steel Roberts publishers, Wellington, 2008, page 106, ISBN 978 1 877448 46 1
- My Brother's War, David Hill, Penguin, 2012 ISBN 9780143307174 – the story in this book draws from Baxter's experiences.
- Field Punishment No 1, (2014) – docu-drama based on David Grant's book
- War Hero (2026) — Play by Michael Galvin as a commission for the Bruce Mason Playwriting Award, based on We Will Not Cease, mounted by Stagecraft theatre company at the Gryphon Theatre, Wellington in May 2026.

== See also ==
- Christian pacifism
- Compulsory Military Training in New Zealand
- List of peace activists

== Bibliography ==
- Baker, Paul. King and Country Call: New Zealanders, Conscription and the Great War. Auckland, New Zealand, Auckland University Press, 1988, ISBN 1869400348
- Baxter, M. The Memoirs of Millicent Baxter. Whatamongo Bay, Cape Catley Ltd., 1981, ISBN 9780908561117
- McKay, F. The Life of James K. Baxter. Auckland, Oxford University Press, 1990, ISBN 9780195581348
