= Margaret Lorimer =

New Zealand school principal and mountaineer

Margaret Lorimer (9 June 1866 – 29 October 1954) was a New Zealand school principal and mountaineer.

== Early life and education ==
She was born in Inverness, Scotland and moved to Lyttelton, New Zealand with her family in 1874. She attended Christchurch Girls' High School and took the university entrance examination in 1883.

== Career ==
She became headmistress of Mount Cook Girls' School, Wellington in 1897. She later served as principal of Nelson College for Girls in 1906, remaining in this role for 19 years.

Margaret Lorimer climbed Mount Moltke in 1912 and continued to have a number of successful climbing seasons in her 50s, ascending Mount Cook – New Zealand's highest mountain – in 1918. She became a member of the New Zealand Alpine Club from 1924, also joining the Ladies' Alpine Club in London.
