= Edith Searle Grossmann =

New Zealand teacher, novelist, journalist and feminist

- Born: Edith Howitt Searle; 8 September 1863; Beechworth, Australia
- Died: 27 February 1931 (aged 68); Auckland, New Zealand
- Occupations: Novelist, freelance journalist

Edith Howitt Searle Grossmann (née Searle, 8 September 1863 – 27 February 1931) was a New Zealand teacher, novelist, journalist and feminist.

== Early life ==
Grossmann was born in Beechworth, Victoria, Australia on 8 September 1863, to Mary Ann Beeby and George Smales Searle. She was the fourth of their five children. Grossmann's parents were acquaintances of the parents of Alfred William Howitt, an explorer who rescued the sole survivor of Robert O'Hara Burke's ill-fated expedition of 1861. As Grossmann was born almost exactly two years after this rescue, they gave their daughter the middle name "Howitt".

Her father was initially a wine merchant in Australia, before becoming a newspaper editor. The family moved to Melbourne and then, in 1878, to Invercargill, where Searle became editor of The Southland Times newspaper.

== Education ==
In Invercargill, Grossmann attended Invercargill Grammar School for a year, before being sent to Christchurch Girls' High School. The principal, Helen Connon, encouraged Grossmann to continue her studies to the end of secondary school, and to apply for a university scholarship. In her final year, Grossmann was head girl of the school.

Grossmann studied at Canterbury College from 1880 to 1885, during which time she received a number of prizes and honours, and was also an active participant in student life. She had received a junior scholarship to enter the College, and in 1882 also received a senior scholarship. In 1881, she won second prize in the Bowen Essay Competition, and in 1882, the first prize. Grossmann was also a member of the university debating society and participated in debates on contemporary issues such as the Married Women's Property Bill of 1884, and the higher education of women.

When Grossmann completed her studies, she held both a B.A. degree and an M.A. degree with first class honours in Latin and English, and third class honours in political science.

== Career ==
After her graduation, Grossmann taught at Wellington Girls' College until 1890, initially as assistant mistress, then later as second assistant.

Her non-fiction writing ranged from essays on theology and philosophy to articles on the women's movement, and pieces of literary criticism, and appeared in a number of publications, including the Empire Review and the Westminster Review. She also wrote fiction, including poetry, which was published in Zealandia magazine, and short stories, published in the Otago Daily Times.

From 1903 to 1912 she lived in London and was a freelance writer there, often writing on issues related to New Zealand. While living in London, she was a founding member of the New Zealand Circle at the Lyceum Club, a club for professional women, and a member of The Austral, another club specifically for women from the colonies. Grossmann found these clubs very useful for making contacts in the writing world, and advised other women to join them. Some of her fellow club members were Kate Isitt and Dora Wilcox.

Grossmann was the author of four novels and one biography:

- Angela;- A Messenger (1890)
- In Revolt (1893)
- A Knight of the Holy Ghost (1907); republished as Hermione; A Knight of the Holy Ghost (1908)
- A Life of Helen Macmillan Brown (1905)
- The Heart of the Bush (1910)

Grossmann was an advocate of women's suffrage and in 1892 she and her husband were founding members of the Canterbury Women's Institute, which campaigned for the vote. She signed the suffrage petition submitted to Parliament in 1893 by Kate Sheppard.

== Personal life ==
In 1890, Grossmann married Joseph Penfound Grossmann, a master at Wellington Boys' High School, who had been a fellow student of hers at Canterbury College. Grossmann resigned from her teaching position and the couple moved back to Christchurch where her husband took a teaching position at Christchurch Boys' High School. Their only child, Arthur Searle, was born in 1894, and was considered to be intellectually handicapped. Grossmann separated from her husband around 1897, and the couple never reconciled.

Arthur lived with Grossmann, including in London, until around 1914, when his father arranged for him to live on a farm near Christchurch with family friends. This enforced separation from her son had a significant impact on Grossmann's mental health; she wrote a letter to the editor of the Auckland Star as late as 1929, in which she complained of the effects of separating the mentally ill from their loved ones.

Grossmann died on 27 February 1931 at her home in Auckland, and was buried at Hillsborough Cemetery.

== Legacy ==
In 1999, the Canterbury Branch of the New Zealand Society of Authors laid a trail of 32 plaques around Christchurch commemorating notable writers of the city, including Edith Grossmann.
