= Journal of Coastal Research =

- Discipline: Geography, environmental science
- Language: English
- Edited by: Charles W. Finkl

Publication details
- Former name(s): Litoralia
- History: 1984-present
- Publisher: Coastal Education & Research Foundation
- Frequency: Bimonthly
- Impact factor: 0.915 (2016)

Standard abbreviations
- ISO 4: J. Coast. Res.

Indexing
- ISSN: 0749-0208 (print); 1551-5036 (web)
- OCLC no.: 682021147

Links
- Journal homepage; Online access; Online archive

The Journal of Coastal Research is a bimonthly peer-reviewed scientific journal covering research on coastal studies and processes. It was established in 1984 as Litoralia, obtaining its current name in 1985. It is published by the Coastal Education and Research Foundation, whose president and executive director, Charles W. Finkl, is also the journal's editor-in-chief. The journal has been a member of BioOne since 2005. According to the Journal Citation Reports, the journal has a 2016 impact factor of 0.915, ranking it 193rd out of 229 journals in the category "Environmental Sciences".
