= Colin Woodroffe =

Australian geographer and geomorphologist

Colin David Woodroffe is a British-born Australasian geographer and coastal geomorphologist currently serving as professorial fellow at the University of Wollongong, having previously taught at Sheffield and Auckland. He is the coordinator of the GeoQuEST Research Centre.

He left his native England to study tropical coasts around the world, later spending five years at ANU's North Australia Research Unit in Darwin studying the environmental history of tidal rivers in the Kakadu region. In 1988, he became a faculty member at the University of Wollongong. His international research focuses on the morphology, stratigraphy and sedimentary dynamics of tropical and subtropical coasts, and the application of Geographical Information Systems (GIS) to the study of processes and change in the coastal zone.

== Research topics ==
- Morphodynamics of estuaries and deltas
- Reef morphology and sedimentation
- Coral paleoclimatology and ocean circulation
- Reef island evolution and climate change

== Publications ==
- Woodroffe, C.D., B. Samosorn, Q. Hua, and D.E. Hart (2007) "Incremental accretion of a sandy reef island over the past 3000 years indicated by component-specific radiocarbon dating". Geophysical Research Letters, 34: L03602, doi:10.1029/2006GL028875.
- Woodroffe, C.D. (2007) "Critical thresholds and the vulnerability of Australian tropical coastal ecosystems to the impacts of climate change". Journal of Coastal Research, Special Issue, vol. 50: pp. 469–473.
- Woodroffe, C.D., Kennedy, D.M., Brooke, B.P. and Dickson, M.E. (2006) "Geomorphological evolution of Lord Howe Island and carbonate production at the latitudinal limit to reef growth". Journal of Coastal Research, vol. 22: pp. 188–201.
- Woodroffe, C.D., Nicholls, R.J., Saito, Y., Chen, Z. and Goodbred, S.L. (2006) "Landscape variability and the response of Asian megadeltas to environmental change". Global Change and Integrated Coastal Management: The Asia-Pacific Region, Springer, pp. 277–314.
- Woodroffe, C.D., Kennedy, D.M., Jones, B.G. and Phipps, C.V.G., 2004. "Geomorphology and Late Quaternary development of Middleton and Elizabeth Reefs". Coral Reefs, vol. 23: pp. 249–262.
- Woodroffe, C.D. (2003) Coasts, form, process and evolution. Cambridge University Press, 623pp.
- Woodroffe, C.D., Beech, M.R. and Gagan, M.K. (2003) "Mid-late Holocene El Nino variability in the equatorial Pacific from coral microatolls". Geophysical Research Letters, vol. 30, pp. 1358–1361.
- Kennedy, D.M. and Woodroffe, C.D. (2002) "Fringing reef growth and morphology: a review". Earth-Science Reviews, vol. 57, pp. 255–277.
