= Myrtle May Simpson =

New Zealand teacher, school inspector and educationalist (1905–1981)

Myrtle May Simpson (1905–1981) was a notable New Zealand teacher, school inspector and educationalist. She was born in Christchurch, New Zealand in 1905. Simpson completed her master's degree at Canterbury University College (now the University of Canterbury) in 1935, with a thesis on the history of the New Zealand Parliament between 1856 and 1860.
