= Stephanie Grace Young =

Stephanie Grace Young (1890–1983) was a notable New Zealand headmistress and educationalist. She was born in Stroud, Gloucestershire, England in 1890. She was headmistress of St Margaret's College, Christchurch in 1931.
