= Helen Connon =

New Zealand women's education pioneer

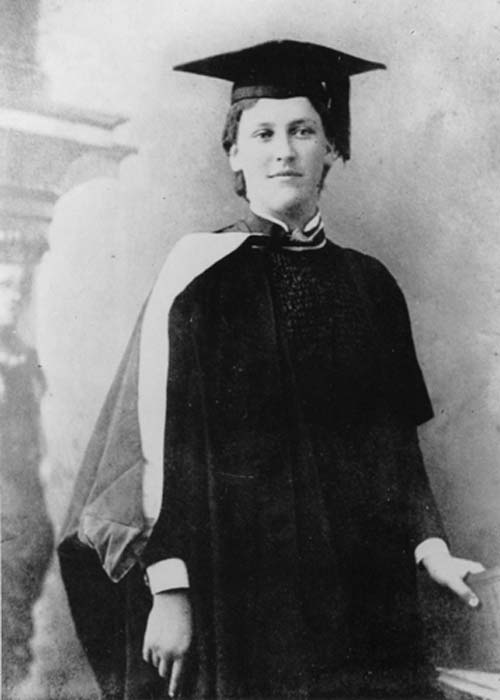
- Helen Connon in academic dress
- Born: c. 1860; Melbourne, Colony of Victoria
- Died: 22 February 1903 (aged 43); Rotorua, Colony of New Zealand
- Education: Canterbury College
- Known for: First woman in the British Empire to gain an Honours degree
- Spouse: John Macmillan Brown
- Children: Millicent Baxter and Viola Macmillan Brown
- Relatives: Archibald Baxter (son-in-law); James K. Baxter (grandson)

Helen Connon (c. 1860 – 22 February 1903) was an educational pioneer from Christchurch, New Zealand. She was the first woman in the British Empire to receive a university degree with honours.

== Early life ==
Connon was born in Melbourne, in 1859 or 1860 to George Connon, a Welsh carpenter and his Scottish wife Helen Hart. She was their second child. The family arrived in Dunedin around 1862.

== Education ==
In Dunedin, Connon was taught by a newly qualified teacher, Robert Stout; he would later become Prime Minister of New Zealand.

After the family moved to Hokitika, she was enrolled in Hokitika Academy – a boys' school, because the local girls school (a Dame school) was considered inadequate by her mother. At this school she soon outshone the boys. The principal was impressed and opened a class for girls, placing the 15-year-old Helen in charge. When she was 16, she received a school prize called "Facile princeps" – "Easily the Best".

In 1874 the family moved to Christchurch and Connon's mother pleaded with the newly arrived Professor John Macmillan Brown to enrol her daughter as Canterbury College's first woman student. She matriculated in 1878, and graduated with a BA in 1880 – the second woman arts graduate in the British Empire. She was beaten only by Kate Edger, also a New Zealander, who graduated on 11 July 1877.

When Connon graduated with an MA with first-class honours in English and Latin in 1881, she became the first woman in the British Empire to gain a degree with honours.

== Career ==
In 1878, while still a university student, Connon became one of the first five teachers at Christchurch Girls' High School, teaching English, Latin and mathematics. In 1882, at the age of 25, she was appointed the school's second principal, and held this position until her resignation due to poor health in 1894.

Under Connon's leadership, the school curriculum was expanded to include practical subjects such as cookery, nursing and dressmaking. She was an advocate of physical exercise and introduced lessons in gymnastics, swimming and tennis to the school. The school was also one of the first in the country to provide instruction in drill. Connon was closely involved in the education of the girls, visiting classrooms, reading exam papers and providing extra teaching as needed. She also provided extra tuition, in her own time, to the brightest pupils of the school, encouraging them to apply for university scholarships. One of her star pupils was Edith Searle Grossmann, who became a writer and taught at Wellington Girls' College.

As a result, the school was highly successful – between 1879 and 1883, Christchurch Girls' High School won more awards and honours than any other secondary school in New Zealand.

== Personal life ==
While she was a student, Macmillan Brown asked Connon to marry him; however she asked him to wait and also stipulated that he must allow her to continue working after their marriage – an uncommon state of affairs for the times. Connon and Macmillan Brown were eventually married at Christchurch on 9 December 1886. They bought a property in the suburb of Fendalton and had two daughters: Millicent in 1888 and Viola in 1897. Millicent later married Archibald Baxter and was mother to the poet James K. Baxter.

In 1892 Connon and Macmillan Brown took leaves of absence from their positions and travelled to Europe. In 1896, after Connon had retired, they returned with Millicent, and in 1900 they went again, with both daughters and their governess.

Connon suffered from insomnia and the effects became increasingly serious for her. She also had two miscarriages which appeared to take their toll on her. She fell ill while travelling through Rotorua in 1903 during a holiday with her husband, and was diagnosed with diphtheria. She died there on 22 February.

== Legacy ==
After his wife's death, John Macmillan Brown established the Helen Macmillan Brown Bursary, to be awarded to up to ten women students of the University of Canterbury each year. Her former pupil, Edith Searle Grossmann, wrote a biography of Connon, which was published in 1905.

In 1916, Helen Connon Hall was opened on Park Terrace, Christchurch. It was the first hall of residence for University of Canterbury students, and was home to up to 70 women students each year. When the university moved from its inner city site to its new site at Ilam in the 1970s, the building was sold to Cathedral Grammar School.

In 2017, Connon was selected as one of the Royal Society Te Apārangi's "150 women in 150 words", celebrating the contributions of women to knowledge in New Zealand.

A marble bust of Connon is displayed in the Macmillan Brown Library at the University of Canterbury.

There is a memorial plaque to Connon in the Great Hall of the present-day Christchurch Arts Centre; these buildings were originally Canterbury College's campus.

Christchurch Girls' High School awards a memorial prize in Connon's name each year.
