= Marine Geology (journal) =

Peer-reviewed scientific journal

- Discipline: Marine geology
- Language: English

Publication details
- History: 1964–present
- Publisher: Elsevier
- Open access: No
- Impact factor: 2.710 (2014)

Standard abbreviations
- ISO 4: Mar. Geol.

Indexing
- ISSN: 0025-3227

Links
- Journal homepage

Marine Geology is a peer-reviewed scientific journal about marine geology published by Elsevier. About its scope the journal states "We accept papers on subjects as diverse as seafloor hydrothermal systems, beach dynamics, early diagenesis, microbiological studies in sediments, palaeoclimate studies and geophysical studies of the seabed."
