= Field punishment =

Punishment used against military personnel in active duty

Field punishment is any form of punishment used against military personnel in the field; that is, field punishment does not require that the member be incarcerated in a military prison or reassigned to a punishment battalion. It may be formalised under a system of military law and may be a sentence imposed in a court martial or similar proceedings.

In English language contexts, "field punishment" refers specifically to Field Punishment Number One, which was used by the British Army between 1881 and 1923 and the armies of some other British Empire countries.

== British Army ==
=== 1881–1923 ===
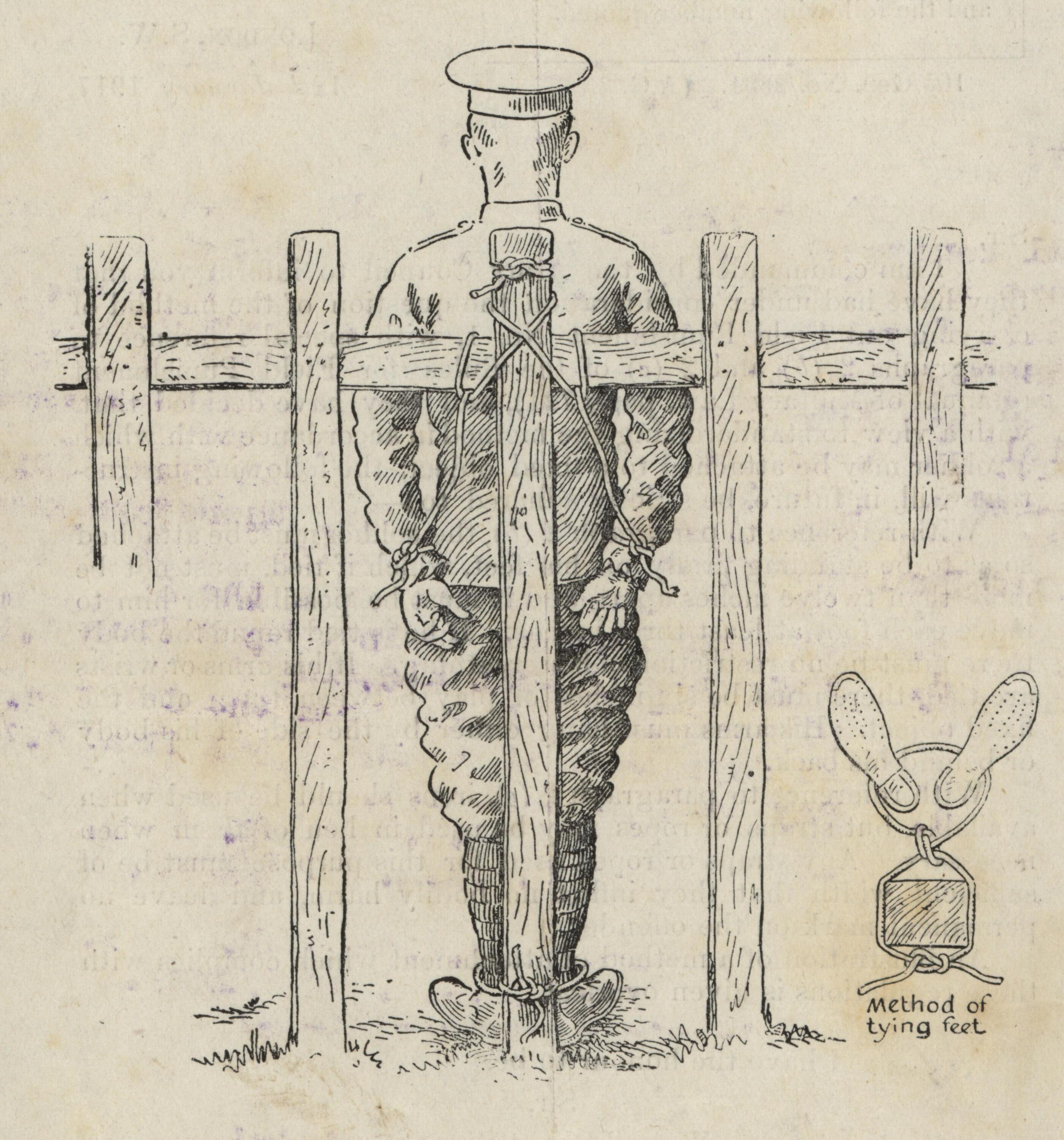
Contemporary illustration of Field Punishment Number One

Field Punishment had been introduced on home service in 1868 and on active service in 1881 as a relatively humane replacement for flogging (the latter was still used in military prisons until 1907). It was a common punishment during World War I. A commanding officer could award field punishment for up to 28 days, while a court martial could award it for up to 90 days, either as Field Punishment Number One or Field Punishment Number Two.

Field Punishment Number One, often abbreviated to "F.P. No. 1", "No. 1 field", or even just "No. 1", consisted of the convicted man being placed in fetters and handcuffs or similar restraints and attached to a fixed object, such as a gun wheel or a fence post, for up to two hours per day. During the early part of World War I, the punishment was often applied with the arms stretched out and the legs tied together, giving rise to the nickname "crucifixion". This was applied for up to three days out of four, up to 21 days total. It was usually applied in field punishment camps set up for this purpose a few miles behind the front line, but when the unit was on the move it would be carried out by the unit itself. It has been alleged that this punishment was sometimes applied within range of enemy fire. During World War I Field Punishment Number One was issued by the British Army on 60,210 occasions (many of those punished were repeat offenders).

Conscientious objectors who had been conscripted to the army were treated the same as any other soldier, so when they consistently refused to obey orders they were usually given Field Punishment No. 1. Alfred Evans, who was sent to France where he would be sentenced to death (later commuted) with 34 others claimed that "it was very uncomfortable, but certainly not humiliating". Some conscientious objectors even saw F.P. No. 1 as a badge of honour.

Although the 1914 Manual of Military Law specifically stated that Field Punishment should not be applied in such a way as to cause physical harm, in practice abuses were commonplace. For example, the prisoner would deliberately be placed in stress positions, with his feet not fully touching the ground, or the punishment would be applied in driving rain or snow. The New Zealand conscientious objector Archibald Baxter gave a particularly graphic account of his experience with Field Punishment No. 1 in his autobiography "We Will Not Cease". Baxter's story was dramatised in the 2014 TV movie Field Punishment No 1.

In Field Punishment Number Two, the prisoner was placed in fetters and handcuffs but was not attached to a fixed object and was still able to march with his unit. This was a relatively tolerable punishment.

In both forms of field punishment, the soldier was also subjected to hard labour and loss of pay.

Field Punishment Number One was eventually abolished in 1923, when an amendment to the Army Act which specifically forbade attachment to a fixed object was passed by the House of Lords. However, physical restraint remained a theoretical (though rarely imposed) possibility.

== Other examples ==
=== Australian & New Zealand forces during the Vietnam War ===
According to author Paul Ham, Australian soldiers caught asleep on sentry duty in the Vietnam War, would be sentenced to 28 days' field punishment usually in the form of hard labour and would lose one week's pay. On its first tour of Vietnam the Australian 105th Field Battery came under much media scrutiny as a result of the “O’Neill affair”. In February 1966 20-year-old Gunner Peter O’Neill, who had been absent without leave when rostered for guard duty, failed to appear on a field punishment parade. The battery commander, Major Peter Tedder, had ordered O’Neill to be handcuffed to a metal stake in a weapons pit for 20 days at the Bien Hoa airbase. Gunner O'Neill contends that Major Tedder refused his right to a trial by Court Martial as a result he refused the Major's punishment but he was released and flown to serve time in the army prison at Holsworthy outside Sydney when questions were raised in the Australian parliament. Following a visit by Gough Whitlam and a vote in parliament he was released forthwith. Major Tedder was Court Martialed but acquitted as Gunner O'Neill did not give evidence and the illegal punishment had been condoned by a Superior officer. To date Gunner O'Neill has not told his side of the story.

New Zealand servicemen that served in the Vietnam War with V Force (Vietnam Force) were not exempt from field punishment with some being locked inside large shipping containers for considerable time in the sweltering heat.

=== Argentine forces in the Malvinas/Falklands war ===
According to Ernesto Alonso, a senior member of the Centre of Former Malvinas Islands Combatants in La Plata (CECIM), Argentine officers and NCOs ordered the staking out of several conscripts during the Falklands War. Most were 10th Brigade conscripts, and had for example repeatedly fallen asleep during night-time sentry duty like the case of Private Claudio Alberto Carbone from B Company 7th Regiment on Mount Longdon or had gone Absent Without Leave (AWOL) from their defensive positions to go hunting for sheep in the middle of minefields like the case of Private Silvio Katz from B Company 3rd Regiment in Sector Cobre (Copper) covering the southern beaches of Port Stanley.

On the night of 8–9 June, a number of soldiers from the 7th Regiment's A Company deserted their positions on Wireless Ridge and after crossing a river broke into the house of Claude and Judy Molkenbuhr in Murrell Farm and completely vandalized the house, along with valuables. The four deserters involved, Privates Carlos Alberto Hornos, Pedro Vojkovic, Alejandro Vargas and Manuel Zelarayán were killed when their heavily laden wooden boat struck an anti-tank mine on the opposite bank.

On 13 June, Private Juan Carlos González from N Company 5th Marine Battalion on Tumbledown Mountain and Private Mario Ramón Luna from B Company 6th Regiment in reserve positions near Tumbledown were killed around midday by Argentine Commandos laying in ambush position near Goat Ridge in a friendly-fire incident while these deserters along with a number of others were returning from raiding the abandoned food cache that B Company 6th Regiment that had been forced to leave behind on Two Sisters Mountain while taking up new defensive positions on the night of 11-12 June. This tragedy is cited by some in Argentina as further evidence supporting the necessity of severe, immediate military discipline to prevent soldiers from leaving their defensive positions, which could otherwise lead to operational chaos or misidentification in the field.

In a 2019 interview with ‘Radio Noticias’, former Private Gustavo Alberto Placente from the 181st Military Police Company explained that the harsh field punishments that many in CECIM consider were unwaranted brutal cases of torture, were absolutely necessary to keep the conscript defenders in line and save them from potential harm from minefields and both enemy and friendly-fire but most importantly to protect the lives of local civilians in Port Stanley and keep Argentine soldiers out of the abandoned houses of the Falklanders that had sought safety in the Falklands interior.Captain Miguel Ángel Romano, a reserve officer, had been sent to Port Stanley to help take charge of the 181st Military Police Company during the Argentine occupation. According to Falklander Patrick Watts from Port Stanley: "He took appropriate action against conscripts caught stealing from unoccupied dwellings and tried to help the civilian community as far as his rank would allow."

=== French Foreign Legion ===
The French Foreign Legion had its own field punishment. A legionnaire in the 1990s, Gareth Carins, witnessed this punishment. While in training, a recruit called Schuhmann was caught deserting the training camp. Carins in the book Voices of the Foreign Legion: The French Foreign Legion in Its Own Words described how he saw Schuhmann slumped at the bottom of a flag pole: "His wrists had been bound together behind the flag pole, as had his ankles, so that it was impossible to stand up, and he was forced into a sort of kneeling position. I could see blood on the side of his face." In the book Mouthful of Rocks: Through Africa and Corsica in the French Foreign Legion former legionnaire and author Chris Jennings writes that recruits, as a form of punishment, had to dig graves in frozen soil, where the man would then spend the night, buried up to his neck.
