= Eileen Fairbairn =

Teacher, geographer

- Born: 27 June 1893; Dunedin, New Zealand
- Died: 9 August 1981 (aged 88); Christchurch, New Zealand
- Burial place: Saint Mary's Anglican Churchyard, Christchurch
- Education: University of Canterbury, New Zealand; Newnham College, Cambridge, England
- Occupations: Teacher, geographer
- Parents: Andrew Fairbairn (father); Ada Pilkington (mother)

Eileen Fairbairn (27 June 1893 – 9 August 1981) was a New Zealand teacher and geographer who pioneered the teaching of modern geography in New Zealand secondary schools.

== Biography ==
Fairbairn was born in Dunedin, New Zealand on 27 June 1893. Her parents were Ada Pilkington and her husband, Andrew Fairbairn, a "commercial traveller" who shared with her his passion for climbing. Eileen Fairbairn, in turn, nurtured her love for mountains and mountaineering. In 1906 she walked the 53.5 km Milford track on the South Island with her family. Her passion for nature would later focus her interest in geography.

Fairbairn attended Christchurch Girls’ High School and then Canterbury College (now University of Canterbury), graduating with a bachelor's degree in 1915. In 1921 she began teaching at Girls’ High School but her father disapproved of her having a career, so for several years, she continued to live at home and drew no salary.

In 1927 she was in Cambridge, England, earning a diploma in the study of geography at Newnham College there. By 1929 she had returned to New Zealand and Girls’ High School to teach geography, biology and mathematics. At the time geography was not recognised as a separate field of study in New Zealand. "Eileen Fairbairn brought new perspectives to the curriculum, including field trips and the making of relief models. Later she would comment that the new methods were introduced ‘in the face of Departmental opposition which now seems ludicrous’".

In 1942 Fairbairn officially retired from the Girls’ High but returned to do substitute teaching and to take classes at St Andrew’s College and Christ’s College during World War II.

=== Geographer ===
She was an enthusiastic tramper and an associate member of the New Zealand Alpine Club, climbing extensively in the Mt Cook region.

In 1928, Fairbairn was the first geographer from New Zealand to participate in the International Geographical Congress.

In retirement Fairbairn widely travelled and attended international geographical conferences. Her special interests were "the effects of landscape on people and the processes that formed mountains." In 1956 while in Brazil, she made a detailed study of coffee-growing lands, and in 1960 she journeyed north from Sweden into Finland to examine the effects of glaciation.

Fairbairn was a founding member of the Canterbury branch of the New Zealand Geographical Society. She became president in 1961 and in 1973 was named one of its first life members.

Fairbairn never married and died in Christchurch on 9 August 1981 at 88 years of age.

The University of Canterbury awards the Eileen Fairbairn Award to the top geography master's student, who wears the Fairbairn gown at graduation.

== Select publications ==
- Fairbairn, Eileen. "Geographical congress in Brazil." New Zealand Geographer 13.1 (1957): 84–84.

== Literature ==
- Banks, Eileen. "Miss Eileen Fairbairn." New Zealand Journal of Geography 72.1 (1982): 22–22.
- Matthews, Kay Morris. "'Imagining Home': women graduate teachers abroad 1880–1930." History of Education 32.5 (2003): 529–545.
