= Rangi Ruru Girls' School =

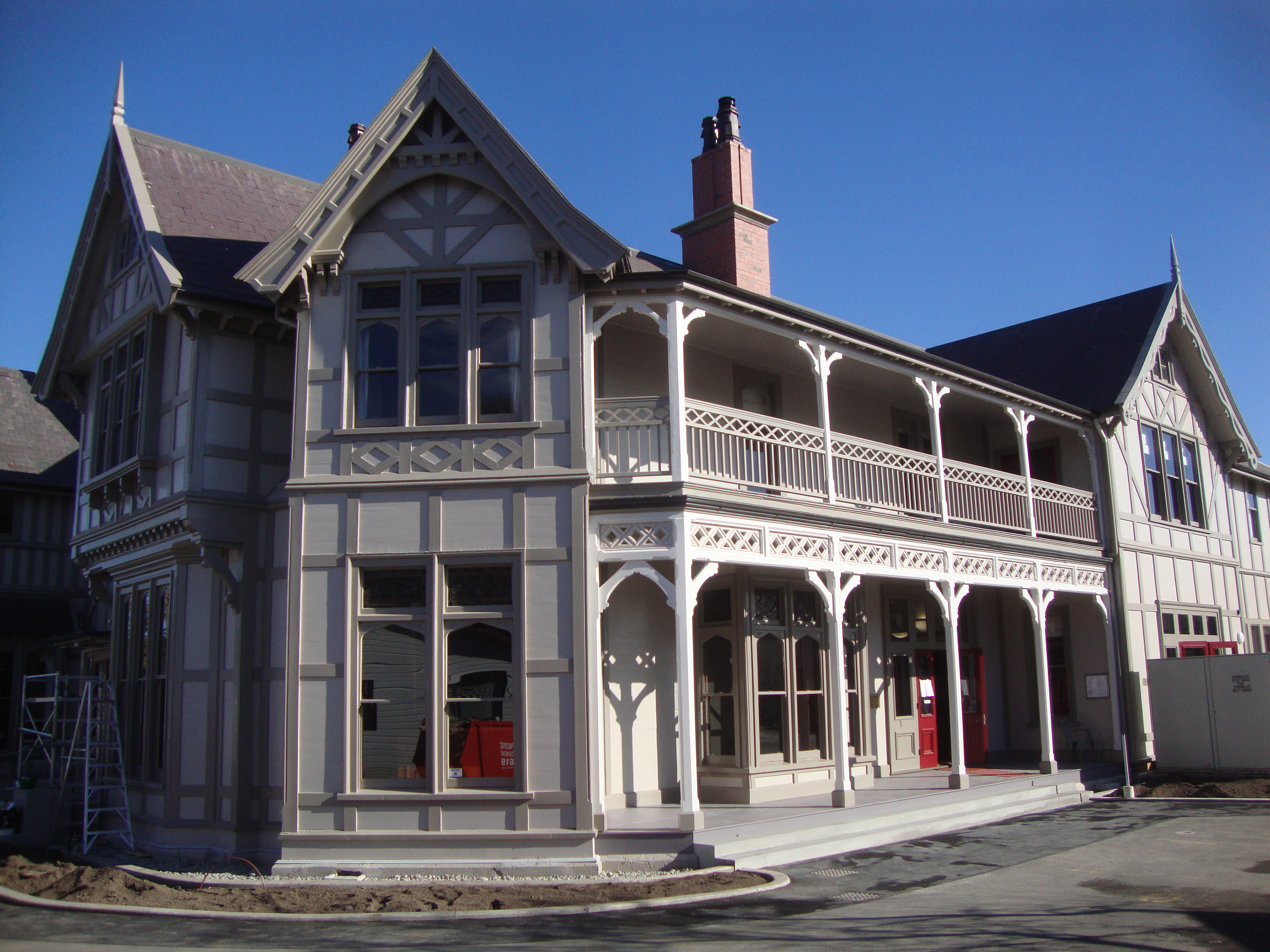
- Te Koraha, the administration building of Rangi Ruru

Location
- 59 Hewitts Road, Merivale, Christchurch, 43.5192°S 172.6175°E

Information
- Type: Independent Single sex girls Intermediate and Secondary (Year 7–13) school with boarding facilities (Boarding from Year 7)
- Motto: Māori: Whaia to te rangi (Seek the heavenly things)
- Established: 1889
- Ministry of Education Institution no.: 325
- Chairperson: Nicki Carter
- Principal: Tracy Herft
- Enrolment: 705 (July 2026)
- Socio-economic decile: 10
- Website: RangiRuru.school.nz (requires plugin)

Rangi Ruru Girls' School is a New Zealand private girls' day and boarding secondary school located in Merivale, an inner suburb of Christchurch. The school is affiliated with the Presbyterian Church and serves approximately 705 girls from Years 7 to 13 (ages 10 to 18).

== History ==
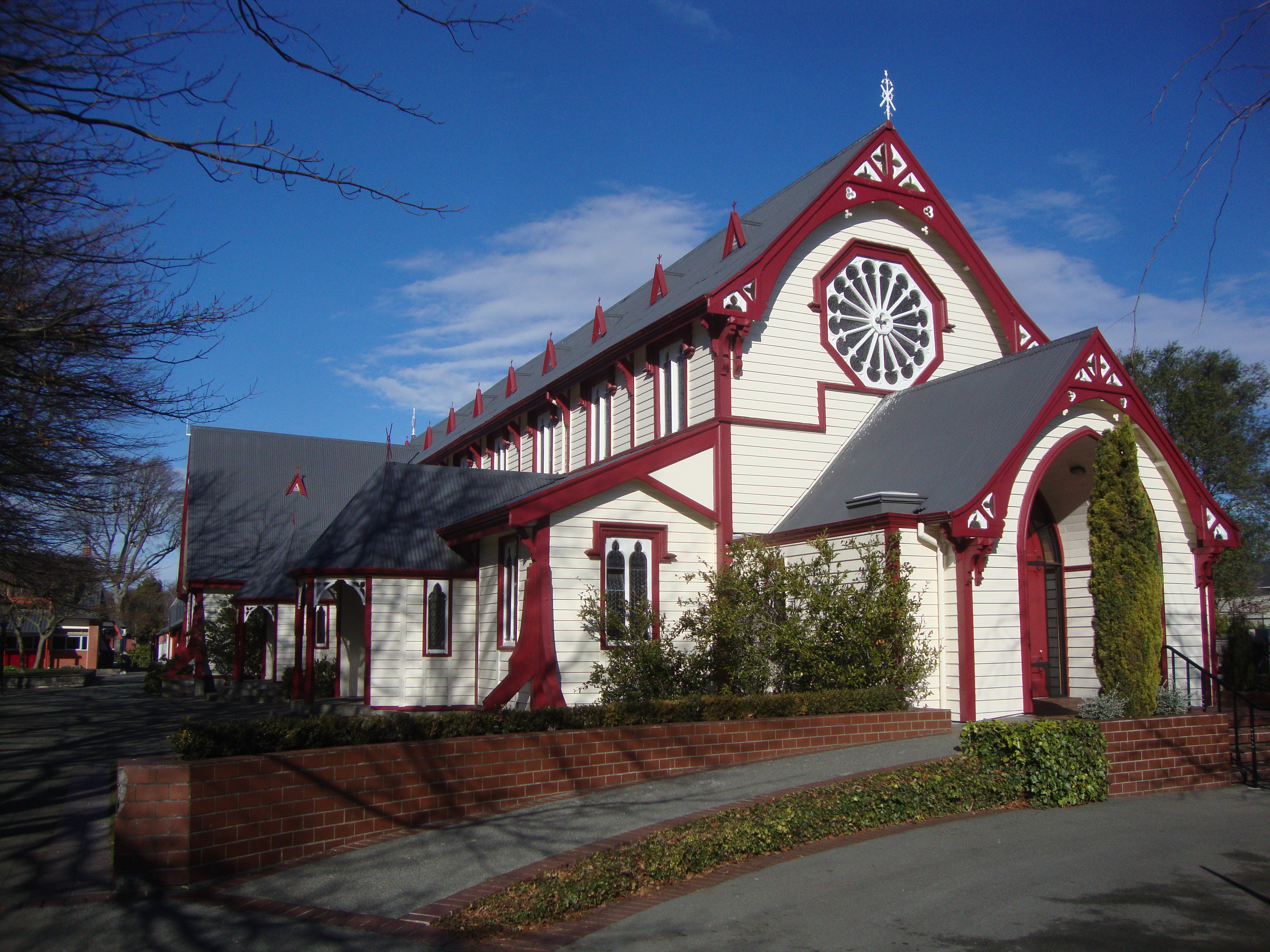
St Andrew's Church at Rangi Ruru

The school was founded in 1889 when Frederick Gibson bought a school run in Papanui by friends of his, Ada, Kate and Jessie Gresham, who were moving to Australia. The school had 18 students, aged 5 to 16 years old. Initially Gibson's daughters Alice and Helen and their mother Mary ran the school, calling it "Miss Gibson's Private School for Girls". In 1891, the school moved to a building in Webb Street and was renamed Rangi Ruru, meaning "wide sky-shelter". This name had been suggested by a Māori chief of Rapaki Pa, Pāora Taki, a friend of Frederick Gibson. Helen Gibson continued as Principal and her sisters Alice, Ethel, Ruth and Winifred joined as teachers. Under Helen Gibson's leadership the school roll grew, reaching over 200 students at the time of her death in 1938. From 1938 until the sale of the school in 1946, Ethel Gibson was principal; her sisters continued to assist and support her.

The school moved to its present site in 1923, as the Webb Street building was becoming too small. Te Koraha, the original house on the site, had been the home of the Rhodes family; it was made available to the Duke and Duchess of Cornwall and York for their June 1901 royal visit to Christchurch.

The Rangi Ruru Board of Governors was established in 1946 when Presbyterian Church members purchased the school from the Gibson family. While the Christchurch Presbytery approves appointments, the board is autonomous.

In the early 1980s, the school wanted an on-site chapel, while simultaneously the congregation of St. Andrew's Presbyterian Church at Hospital Corner was declining. It was decided to relocate the church to the school site, and in 1986, the building was moved to land adjacent to the school on Merivale Lane. The church became known as "St Andrew's at Rangi Ruru".

== Enrolment ==
As a private school, Rangi Ruru charges tuition fees to cover costs. For the 2025 school year, tuition fees for New Zealand residents are $27,150 per year for students in years 7 and 8 and $30,300 per year for students in years 9 and above. Boarding fees are $19,200 per year.

As of July 2026, Rangi Ruru has roll of 705 students, of which 56 (7.9%) identify as Māori. As a private school, the school is not assigned an Equity Index.

== Academic achievement ==
Rangi Ruru is consistently one of New Zealand's highest-achieving schools in academic achievement.

In 2013, all girls who left Rangi Ruru held at least NCEA Level 1, while 98.2% held at least NCEA Level 2, and 92.0% held at least University Entrance. This was in contrast to the national percentages of 86.8%, 77.2%, and 55.4%, respectively, for girls.

== Notable alumnae ==
- Sophie Devine (born 1989), cricket and hockey player
- Elizabeth Edgar (born 1929), botanist
- Sophia Fenwick (born 1992), netball player
- Kenneth Gresson (1891–1974), soldier, lawyer, university lecturer and judge (attended before Rangi Ruru became a girls' school)
- Polly 'PJ' Harding (born 1990), radio host
- Eve MacFarlane (born 1992), rower
- Margaret Munro (1914–2005), architect
- Elizabeth Manu (born 1986), netball player
- Annabel Ritchie (born 1978), lawyer and rower
- Francie Turner (born 1992), rowing cox
- Cassie Henderson (born 1999), singer-songwriter

== Notable staff ==
- Helen Gibson (born 1868), educator and principal
