= Nelson College for Girls =

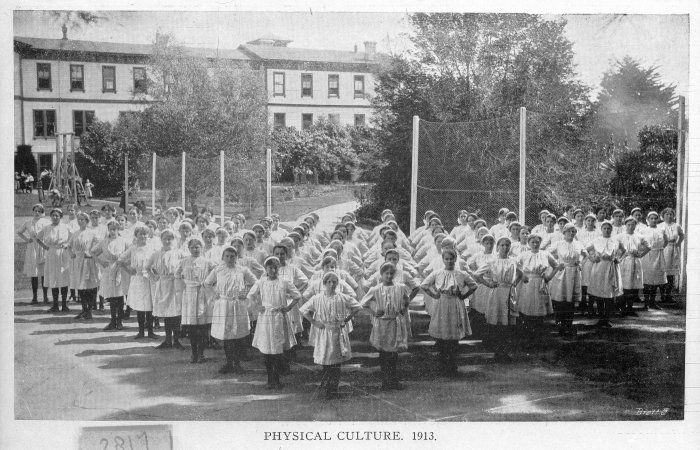
- A 1913 physical education class at Nelson College for Girls.

Location
- Trafalgar St; Nelson; New Zealand; 41.2791°S 173.2821°E

Information
- Type: State secondary, day and boarding
- Motto: Latin: Pietas Probitas et Sapientia (Loyalty, honesty and wisdom)
- Established: 1883; 143 years ago
- Sister school: Nelson College
- Ministry of Education Institution no.: 295
- Principal: Claire O'Fee
- Enrolment: 964 (July 2026)
- Socio-economic decile: 7
- Website: ncg.school.nz

Nelson College for Girls is an all-girls state school in Nelson, New Zealand. Established in 1883, it has close ties with the all-boys Nelson College and has a private Preparatory School.

Nelson College for Girls was one of the highest rankings school in the Nelson region for NCEA with an average of 71% of Year 13 students achieved NCEA Level 3 in 2005. (This compares with a National average of 51.2% and Decile 7 Girls' schools - 68.9%) The boarding house, Clarice Johnstone House is headed by Mrs. Barbara Symonds and caters for around 120 girls from years 7-13.

== History ==
The school was established in 1883, and its first principal was Kate Edger, who was the first woman to earn a university degree in New Zealand. As was expected at this time, Kate resigned on her marriage in 1890, and was succeeded as Principal by Beatrice Gibson, one of the well-known Gibson sisters, who were very influential in girls’ education in the South Island at the turn of the 20th century. Gibson also resigned on her marriage, in 1900, and Althea Tendall took her place for a period of five years, followed by Margaret Lorimer from 1906 to 1926.

Three of these early principals were graduates of Canterbury College, Christchurch, which came to an agreement with the school to enable pupils resident in Nelson, and enrolled at Nelson College for Girls, to receive university tuition from its staff. The pupils in Nelson were able to enrol in the same university classes as those available in Christchurch, sit the same examinations and receive the same qualifications. This arrangement continued until the 1920s.

Throughout its history, the school has enabled its students to attain high academic success as well as promoting a sense of the importance of being a part of the community. During World War, many Old Girls of the school enlisted as nurses.

The school has a boarding house which caters for a wide range of students from outside of Nelson. The main house is named after another principal, Clarice Johnstone, who was instrumental in setting up the hostel. It caters for around 120 girls from years 7–13.

== Houses ==
The school has five houses that divide the girls into groups for school competitions such as athletics, swimming, music, drama and academics. They are named after local landmarks, mountains, rivers and plains; Dun, Maitai, Maungatapu, Waimea and Whangamoa. Points are collected for each event and the end of the year overall winner is awarded with the Whangamoa Shield.

== Notable alumnae ==
- Muriel Bell (1898–1974) – nutritionist and medical researcher
- Jessica Bygate (born 1992) – basketball player
- Kate Isitt (1876–1948) – writer and journalist
- Courtney Love (born 1964) – singer
- Cora Wilding (1888–1982) – YHA (NZ) founder
- Viran Molisa Trief – first female Solicitor-General and Supreme Court judge of Vanuatu
- Bessie te Wenerau Grace – first Māori woman to achieve a university degree

== Notable staff ==
- Kate Edger – first woman university graduate in New Zealand
- Ethel McMillan – politician
- Richard Nunns – musician
- Dolla Richmond – artist

=== Principals ===
Since its establishment in 1883, Nelson College for Girls has had 13 principals. The following is a complete list:

	Name	Term	Notes
1	Kate Edger	1883–1890	
2	Beatrice Gibson	1890–1900	
3	Althea Tendall	1900–1905	
4	Margaret Lorimer	1906–1926	
5	Clara Mills	1927–1931	
6	Jean Stewart	1932–1946	
7	Clarice Johnstone	1947–1959	
8	Lois Voller	1959–1979	
9	Elizabeth Perrott	1980–1989	
10	Alison McAlpine	1990–2008	
11	Christine Barlow	2008–2009	
–	Claudia Wysocki (acting)	2009–2011	
12	Cathy Ewing	2011–2022	
–	Heather McEwen (acting)	2023	
13	Claire O'Fee	2024–	
