= John Weeks (painter) =

New Zealand artist (1886–1965)

John Weeks OBE
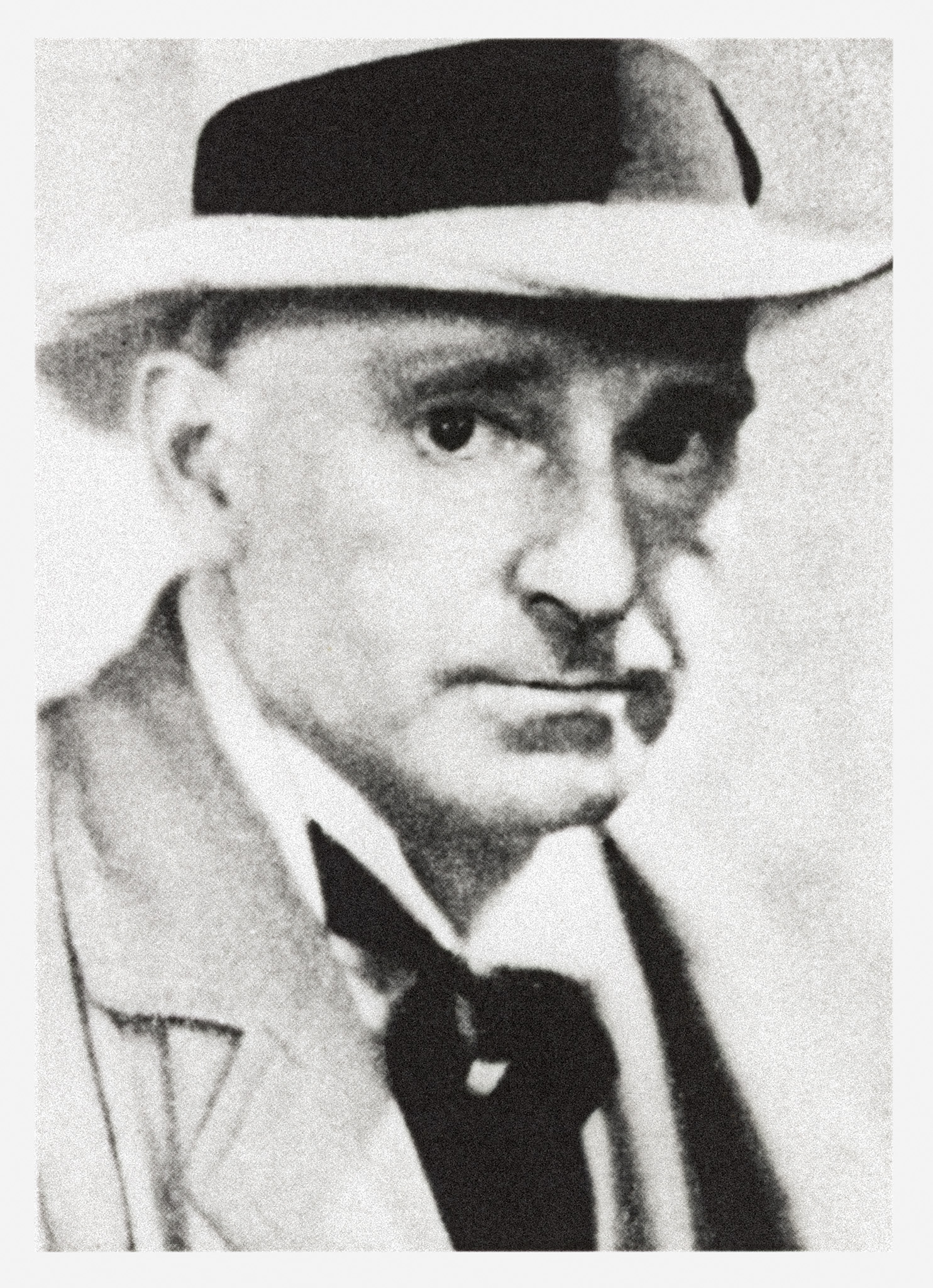
- John Weeks
- Born: 8 June 1886; Devon
- Died: 10 December 1965 (aged 79); Auckland
- Education: Canterbury College School of Art
- Known for: Introducing European modernist art and Cubism to New Zealand and as an influential art teacher
- Style: abstract
- Awards: Bledisloe landscape medal 1935, Order of the British Empire 1958

John Weeks OBE (8 June 1886 – 10 September 1965) was a New Zealand artist and an influential teacher at the Elam Art School of the University of Auckland from 1930 to 1954.

== Early life and education ==
John Weeks was born in Sydenham Damerel, Devon, England, to Emma Kate Weeks (née Hooper) and William John Weeks. They had a second child, Mary. Weeks was six when in 1892 the family migrated to New Zealand. They eventually settled on a farm near Te Awamutu and after Weeks had finished primary school the family moved to a dairy farm in Northcote, Auckland. When he left school Weeks worked as a sign-writer and in 1908 began night-classes at the Elam School of Fine Arts under the instruction of Archibald Nicholl. The following year he was awarded a certificate from the School issued by the Science and Art Department of the Board of Education, London. Weeks continued his work as a signwriter and in 1911 joined his family on a year-long trip to London. He then travelled to Australia where he took art classes at the Sydney Technical College from 1913 to 1915. He was still in Australia at the outbreak of the First World War and returned to New Zealand to enlist serving from 1917 with the No 3 Ambulance Unit. For most of 1919 Weeks was in Britain working in a hospital before again returning to New Zealand. During his time on the front he painted many watercolours of the activities of his unit but was never registered as an official War Artist. Back in New Zealand he studied at Canterbury College School of Art from 1921 to 1922 where his contemporaries included Flo Aitkins, Ivy Fyfe, Olivia Spencer Bower, R. Lonsdale, William Trethewey, Evelyn Polson, Russell Clarke, and James Cook. Weeks continued to show regularly with the Canterbury Society of Arts (catalogue) and with the New Zealand Academy of Fine Arts. In 1939, the NZAFA purchased the painting Fruit and Flowers to gift to the National Art Gallery.

Weeks returned to the UK in 1923 to study at the Edinburgh College of Art and the Royal Scottish Academy for two years. He won the 1925 Painting Prize of the Royal Scottish Academy and three of his works were included in the New Zealand display at the British Empire Exhibition at Wembley. A critic at the time noted, ‘The very second picture in the catalogue commands attention and thought. It is Pearly Morning, the Square, Christchurch, by J. Weeks. Further travels followed in the UK and in Paris where he studied with the Cubist André Lhote in 1925. After living and working in North Africa he returned to Lhote for another year of study in 1929.

== Art teaching career ==
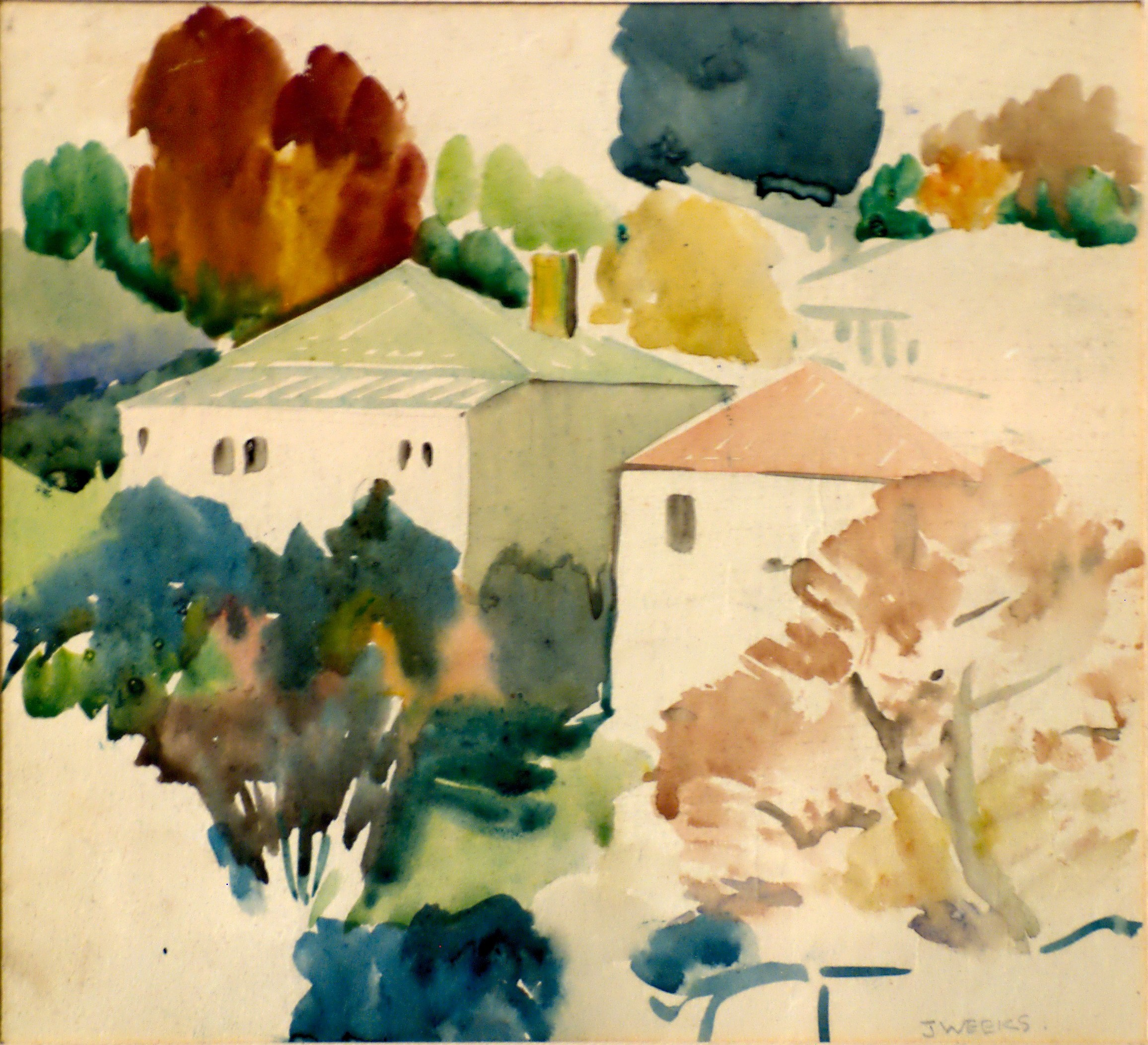
A watercolour sketch undertaken as a demonstration to Elam students

Weeks returned to Auckland late in 1929 and the following year accepted a job as a relief teacher at the Elam School of Art. In 1931 he became a member of the permanent staff teaching painting. Historian Francis Pound describes Weeks at that time as, ‘an extremely rare figure in Nationalist New Zealand – one who had some first-hand contact with European Modernist art.’ Weeks brought this knowledge and, in particular, the influences of Cubism and Cézanne, to his practice both as a teacher and painter. As a teacher Weeks proved very influential both on students and other artists especially as In those early years he was one of the few artists in New Zealand who worked in an abstract style. He did not retire until 1953 and so he was in the position to have an impact on artists as diverse as Louise Henderson and Michael Smither. Over these years Weeks was also an active member of the Auckland Art Society (Brown/Keith) and contributor to The Group and other art society exhibitions around the country. In 1935 he was awarded the Bledisloe landscape medal for his oil painting After the Shower, Waitakere Ranges Writer and critic A.R.D. Fairburn said of Weeks that he was, ‘the starting-point for a school of New Zealand painting’ and this opinion was validated five years later when Weeks’s Still Life was included in the 1940 New Zealand Centennial Exhibition.

In 1949 a wooden building shared by the Adult Education Centre and the Elam School of Arts was destroyed by fire along with 200 of Week’s paintings, watercolours and drawings that were stored there. The destruction of so many items has posed a continuing problem in dating Weeks’s work.

1950 saw Weeks and others draw away from the Auckland Arts Society to form their own association the Thornhill Group. Participants included Louise Henderson, John Tole, Charles Tole, Helen Brown, Alison Pickmere and Wifred Stanley Wallis. They all wanted to bring European ideas into New Zealand by adopting Cubist ideas in their landscapes and still-life paintings. The group’s first exhibition was in Hamilton in 1950 followed by a show at the Helen Hitchings Gallery in Wellington. The following year their third and final exhibition was shown in Auckland. The contribution Weeks had made to the introduction of abstract painting into New Zealand was acknowledged by his being awarded the Queen Elizabeth II Coronation Medal in 1953 and inclusion in the 1954 exhibition Object and Image at the Auckland City Art Gallery. It was the first time a public art gallery had focused on abstract painting in New Zealand and the exhibition included, alongside Weeks, Milan MrKusich, Louise Henderson, Ross Fraser, Kase Jackson, Michael Nicholson and Colin McCahon. McCahon, who had helped organise the exhibition, also noted Weeks’s influence, remarking that in 1950s Auckland, ‘Cubism – or at least a kind of latter-day, provincial manifestation of it – was very much in the air.’ The year after the Object and Image exhibition, Weeks was the subject of the first retrospective of a single New Zealand artist at the Auckland City Art Gallery. This major exhibition of 162 paintings was presented in association with the Auckland Society of Arts (Auckland City Art Gallery and the Auckland Society of Arts, John Weeks, and went on to tour other metropolitan galleries.Eric Westbrook, director of the Gallery, noted in his catalogue introduction that Weeks, ‘never set out to be a 'popular' painter, indeed much of his work has been of a kind which causes protest when produced by other men.’

In 1958, Weeks was appointed an Officer of the Order of the British Empire, OBE for services as an artist. Further recognition came when he was selected for the second of Eric Westbrook’s Eight New Zealand Artists series at the Auckland City Art Gallery. He exhibited alongside Doris Lusk, Janet Paul, Jan Michels, Ron Stenberg, Arthur Thompson, Toss Woollaston and John Zambelis.

John Weeks died at his home in Northcote on 10 September 1965.

=== Recognition by public institutions ===
In 1970 a major collection of Weeks’s work owned by Mrs H. O'Connor was purchased by the four metropolitan galleries. It included 74 oil paintings, 13 watercolours, 16 pastels, 13 drawings and 10 prints. Funds for the purchase were arranged by the Queen Elizabeth II Arts Council and the four City Councils of Auckland, Wellington, Christchurch and Dunedin.

== Selected exhibitions post 1965 ==
1970 John Weeks Robert McDougall Art Gallery

1987 John Weeks (1886-1965) Works Selected from the Permanent Collection Robert McDougall Art Gallery

1999 Manufacturing Meaning: The University of Wellington Art Collection in Context (group) Adam Art Gallery

2108 Freedom and Structure: Cubism and NZ Art (group)1930-60 Auckland Art Gallery Toi o Tāmaki

== Collections ==
Auckland Art Gallery Toi o Tāmaki

Te Papa Tongarewa

Christchurch Art Gallery Te Puna o Waiwhetū

Dunedin Public Art Gallery

Metropolitan Museum of Art, New York

== Essential reading ==
Melvin N. Day John Weeks Career and Credo and John Weeks and Wilfred Stanley Wallis: The Rotorua Connection
