= Pleasure Garden (painting) =

Watercolour painting by Frances Hodgkins

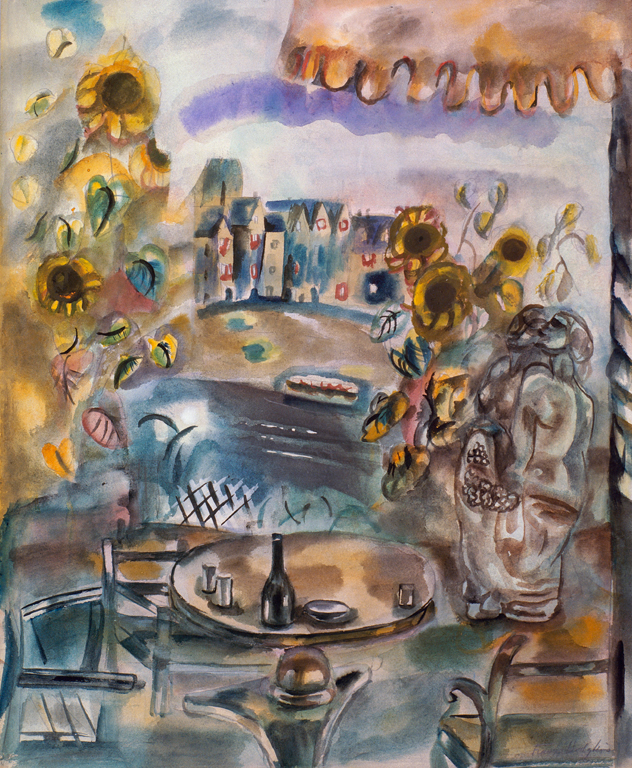
- Artist: Frances Hodgkins
- Completion date: 1932
- Medium: Watercolour
- Movement: British modernism
- Subject: Bridgnorth in Shropshire
- Dimensions: 87.5 cm × 75 cm (34.4 in × 30 in)
- Location: Christchurch Art Gallery Te Puna o Waiwhetū, Christchurch
- Website: christchurchartgallery.org.nz/collection/6908/frances-hodgkins/pleasure-garden

Pleasure Garden (1932) is a watercolour painting by Frances Hodgkins. When it was rejected as a gift to the Robert McDougall Art Gallery in Christchurch, New Zealand, a controversy started. Hodgkins, born in New Zealand, had permanently relocated to the United Kingdom in 1927. After she died in 1947, with many prominent British galleries holding her work, there was a desire to have some of her works held by the Robert McDougall Art Gallery. The Canterbury Society of Arts (CSA) organised for some paintings to come to New Zealand on loan, including Pleasure Garden. The CSA sent Hodgkins' works back, having decided against purchasing any. The artist Margaret Frankel organised a fundraising campaign to purchase Pleasure Garden and to gift it to Christchurch City Council as the owner of the Robert McDougall Art Gallery. It took a year-long campaign before the painting was accepted, with Auckland City Art Gallery meanwhile having offered to purchase the painting.

== The artist ==
Frances Hodgkins was born in Dunedin, New Zealand, in 1869, and after studying there she travelled to Europe multiple times before eventually settling in the United Kingdom permanently around 1927. She exhibited extensively in Europe and in 1940 her work was selected for the 22nd Venice Biennale representing Great Britain, although the event was cancelled because of the declaration of war. Hodgkins died in Dorchester, England, on 13 May 1947.

Five years after Hodgkins' death, the British Arts Council mounted a Memorial Exhibition at Tate Gallery. Her work is held by a number of public art museums including Tate in London who have significant holdings of her works in their collections.

== The painting ==
In the summer of 1932, Hodgkins holidayed with fellow artist Hannah Ritchie at Bridgnorth, Shropshire, on the River Severn. The result of this visit was a number of paintings, watercolours and drawings, including Pleasure Garden and Enchanted Garden, now in the collection of the Sheffield Art Gallery. Tony Green, Professor of Art History at the University of Auckland, described Hodgkins' work at this time as showing "suggestions of Braque's still lifes of the late twenties". In his foreword to the catalogue of the Lefevre Gallery Retrospective in 1946, critic Eric Newton noted that Hodgkins could make watercolours "sing" and even make "browns look positively rapturous", concluding: "She can juggle with colour orchestrally". Art historian Elizabeth Eastmond describes Pleasure Garden as being ‘suggestive of Chinese painting’ a subject that had been featured in the art journal Studio the summer Pleasure Garden was painted. Eastmond also proposes that the statue, unattended table, ’curiously placed cloth and oddly distinct black vase’ gives the painting a surrealist look that could be linked to the painter de Chirico.

== Pleasure Garden in New Zealand ==
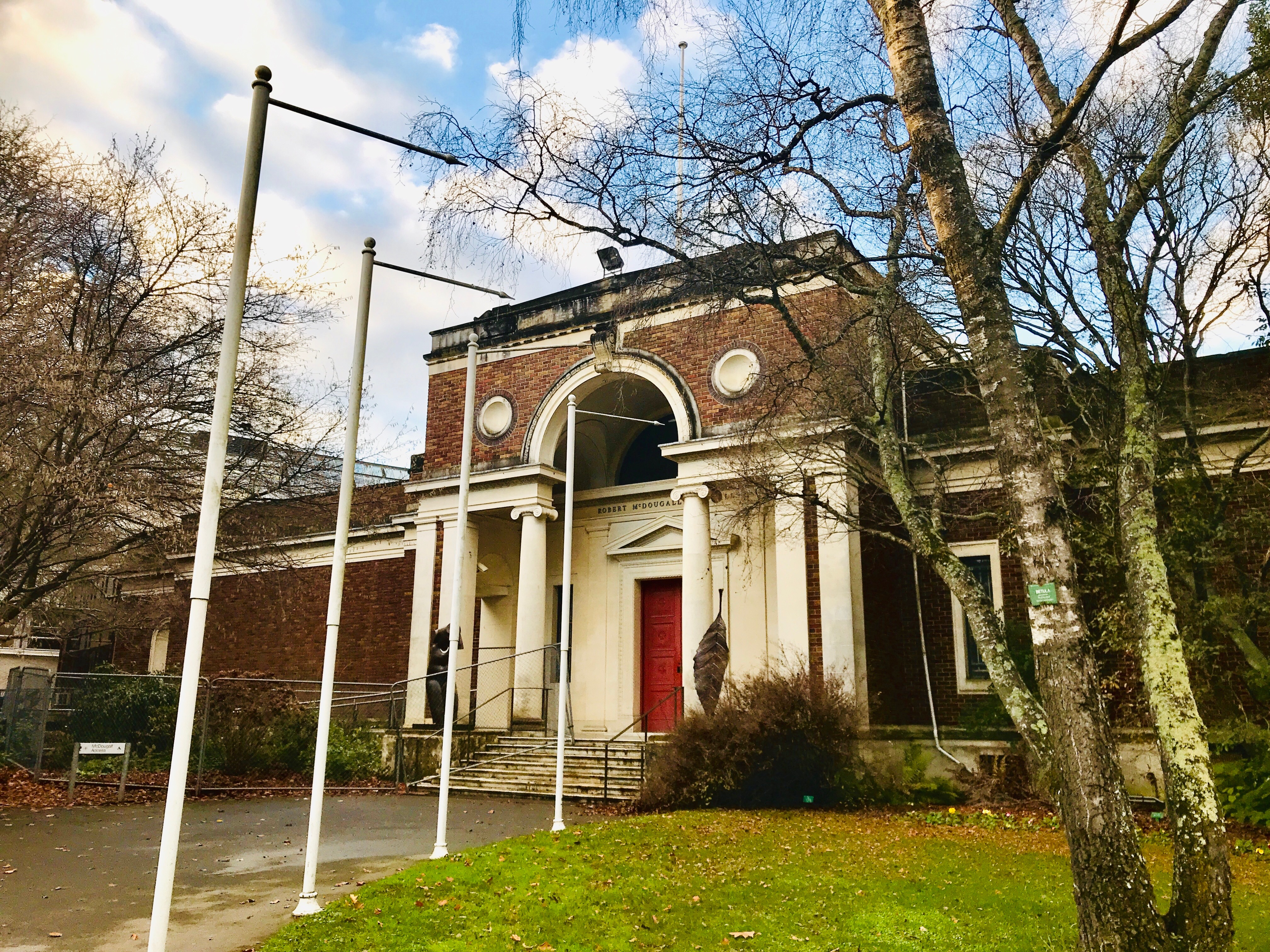
The Robert McDougall Art Gallery in 2018

Hodgkins died in 1947 and the following year the Canterbury Society of Arts (CSA), mindful that her work was not included in the collection of the Robert McDougall Art Gallery, undertook to purchase three paintings and donate them to the gallery. Margaret Frankel, a member of the CSA's Council, worked with the British Arts Council to select six works as possible purchases from the Lefevre Gallery in London. Among the six were Ruined Mine in Wales, Still life with Fruit Dishes and Pleasure Garden. The works arrived in New Zealand and were released from customs under bond in October to be displayed in the 1948 Group exhibition. To the surprise of the press, however, the Secretary of the CSA, William Baverstock (later to be the first professional director of the Robert McDougall Art Gallery) made it clear that the works were definitely "not part of the show" and were not to be "reviewed as part of the exhibition".

== Controversy ==
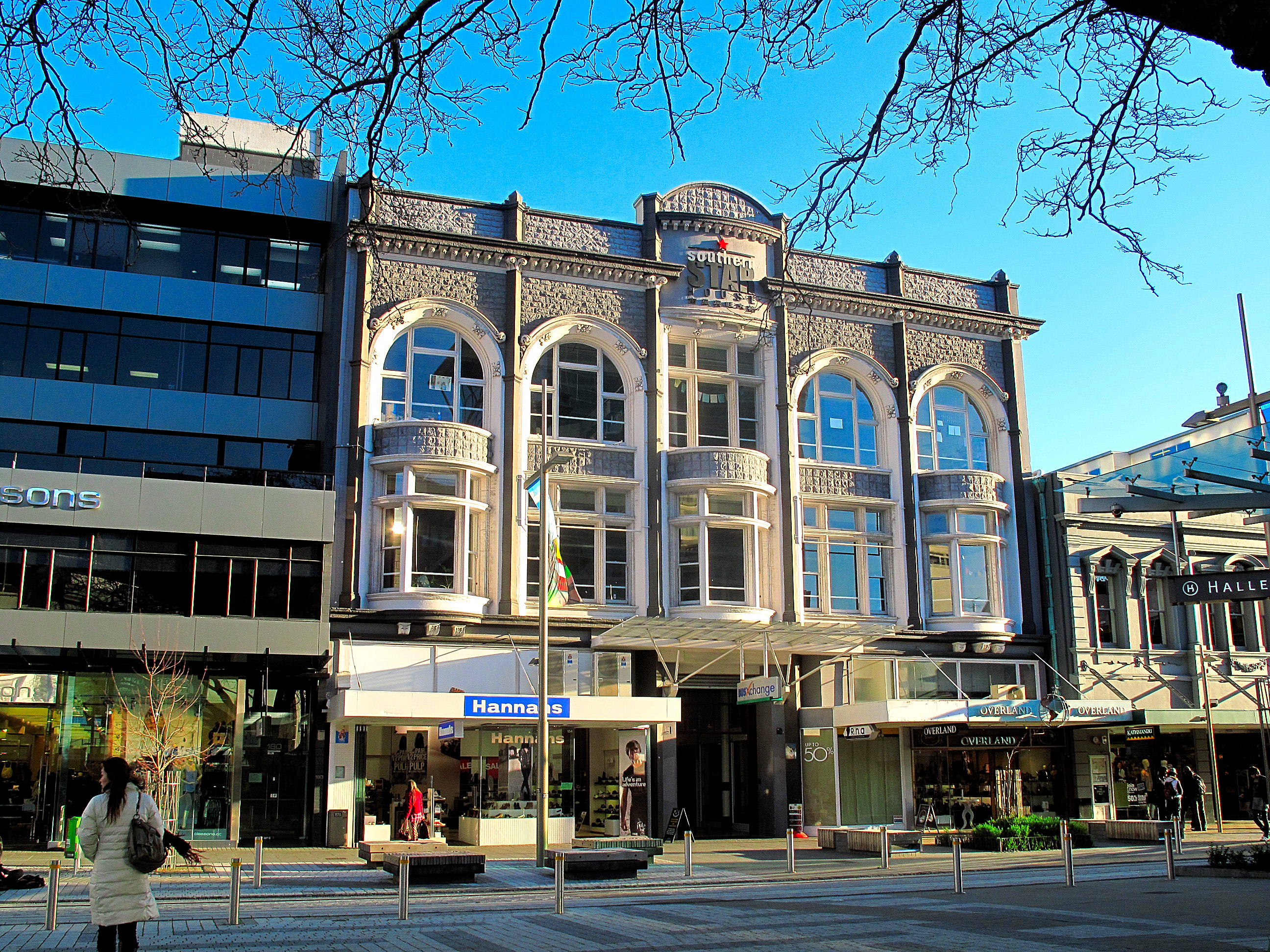
Pleasure Garden was displayed in the window of Beaths department store in Cashel Street.

After discussion, the CSA Council declined to purchase any of the Hodgkins works. The reason was that many of their members were unaware of how contemporary art had developed in Europe lately; the work was too modern for their taste. The following year Frankel initiated a fundraising campaign to purchase Pleasure Garden and gift it to the Robert McDougall Art Gallery via the Christchurch City Council. The 39 subscribers included five current or former members of the Council of the CSA and ten working artists. Notable contributors included Rita Angus, Heathcote Helmore, Douglas Lilburn, Ngaio Marsh, Colin McCahon, Olivia Spencer Bower and the Caxton Press. A full list of donors including the amount of each individual's contribution has been preserved. In preparation for the presentation of the painting to the City Council, Pleasure Garden was displayed in the window of Beaths department store to a mixed reception.

In July the painting was finally offered to the City Council to become part of the Robert McDougall Art Gallery's collection. After Margaret Frankel made an hour-long case for the work the Christchurch City Council, on the recommendation of its artist advisors Archibald Nicoll, Richard Wallwork and Cecil Kelly, declined to accept the painting for the Robert McDougall Art Gallery claiming it to be "unintelligible". It was also described as something " ... a child could do ...". The decision sparked numerous letters for and against in the local press. The letter of artist Colin McCahon berated the council and its advisors: "These gentlemen must be very proud of the three tombs of dead art they have helped to preserve so well, and for so long in this city". The three tombs he referred to were the Canterbury College of Art, the CSA and the Robert McDougall Art Gallery. The decision also created consternation throughout New Zealand with prominent arts people like John Beaglehole, James Bertram, Charles Brasch, Helen Hitchings, M. H. Holcroft, Fredrick Page, Douglas Lilburn, Mervin Taylor and Harry Tombs all writing to the mayor of Christchurch in protest. Frankel herself made the case for Hodgkins' works, including Pleasure Garden, in the 1949 Yearbook of the Arts. "The dispute over the acceptance of the Pleasure Garden exposed the difficulty of implementing any kind of progressive plan for the Gallery if the advisory committee to purchase continued to represent 'only one school of painting'." In November Pleasure Garden was reproduced as a full-colour page in the Arts Year Book No 5.

A month after the City Council's rejection of the work the Auckland City Art Gallery accepted Pleasure Garden on loan and immediately put it on exhibition. John W. Kealy, chairman of the Auckland City Council's library committee, told reporters that "Paintings of this nature are of value in establishing interest in the gallery and making it alive".

In the year following the controversy in Christchurch, Auckland City Art Gallery offered to purchase the painting leaving the owners uncertain of how to proceed. In July 1951 Alan Brassington and Frankel made it clear they were prepared to accept the work from the Auckland Art Gallery if the work was refused again by the Christchurch City Council. When Pleasure Garden was finally presented to the council as a gift in September the vote taken agreed to accept the painting into the Robert McDougall Art Gallery's collection. Before its actual exhibition in the gallery, however, there was some delay while a new frame was made, but Baverstock, now acting as director, noted that a key position in the gallery had been saved for the work. Almost three years after the original offer to gift the work Pleasure Garden was finally exhibited to the general public in the Robert McDougall Art Gallery.

In March 1951, Bill Sutton painted Homage to Frances Hodgkins. Sutton's painting shows key supporters of the painting Doris Lusk, Colin McCahon, Heathcote Helmore, Margaret Frankel, Beth Zanders, R. S. Lonsdale, A. C. Brassington, Olivia Spencer-Bower, John Oakley and Sutton grouped round Pleasure Garden resting on an easel. The painting has been lost but a photograph exists and studies for it are in the collection of the Christchurch Art Gallery along with a number of drawings of the individuals portrayed.

A 2009–2022 exhibition that included this painting provided the following text:

Pleasure garden was the first work by Hodgkins to be acquired for the collection and remains one of the most controversial acquisitions in the Gallery's history.

== Exhibitions ==
A selected list of exhibitions that have included Pleasure Garden:

- 1954 Frances Hodgkins and Her Circle Auckland Art Gallery. The exhibition was organised to coincide with the 1954 Auckland Festival of the Arts.
- 1962 Six New Zealand Expatriates: Grace Joel, Rhona Haszard, Frances Hodgkins, Francis McCracken, Raymond McIntyre, Owen Merton (group) Auckland Art Gallery. The exhibition was curated by Colin McCahon who was at that time Keeper of Collections.
- 1968 Paper Treasures (group) Robert McDougall Art Gallery, Christchurch
- 1969 Frances Hodgkins 1869–1947 Queen Elizabeth II Arts Council of New Zealand and Auckland Art Gallery
- 1980 Canterbury Society of Arts (group) Robert McDougall Art Gallery
- 1993 Frances Hodgkins Museum of New Zealand Te Papa Tongarewa and curated by Jill Trevelyan
- 2015 Treasury: A Generous Legacy (group) Christchurch Art Gallery
- 2019 Frances Hodgkins: European Journeys Auckland Art Gallery Toi o Tāmaki
- 2024 Pleasure Garden: Unheard Stories from the Collection Christchurch Art Gallery Te Puna o Waiwhetū

== Music ==
- 2020 The Pleasure Garden An operetta based on the Pleasure Garden gift was written by Philip Norman and A.K. Grant.
- 2013 The Great Art War a musical by Stuart Hoar and Philip Norman based on the Pleasure Garden controversy premieres at the Court Theatre in Christchurch. William Baverstock was played by Philip Aldridge, Margaret Frankel and Dorothy Richmond by Delia Hannah, Alan Brassington by Robert Tripe and Frances Hodgkins by Juliet Reynolds-Midgley.
