= Ilam School of Fine Arts =

Art school at the University of Canterbury

Coordinates: 43.524704°S 172.585471°E

The Ilam School of Fine Arts at the University of Canterbury, located in the Ilam suburb of Christchurch, New Zealand, was founded in 1882 as the Canterbury College School of Art.

The school became a full department of the university in the 1950s, and was the first department to move to the suburban Ilam site in 1957, in the Okeover Homestead. Art history was included in 1974, and the Bachelor of Fine Arts degree was introduced in 1982.

== History ==
In its original rendition, the school was modelled on the late-Victorian-era Arts and Crafts movement in Britain, centred in London's National Art Training School in South Kensington. Its mission was to give instruction focussing on the "arts and crafts" and their "practical application to the requirements of trade and manufactures.

By 1884, student artworks of sufficient quality to being shown at the Wellington Art Society's Annual Exhibition in the company of J C Richmond, John Gully and C D Barraud and two years later as part of an exhibition of Colonial art in the Royal Albert Hall, London.

By 1912, the college had 365 attending students although as reporters pointed out many of them were doing classes normally provided by technical colleges. In 1920, the New Zealand painter and past student of the school Archibald Nicholl was appointed and would remain head of school to 1927. Along with David Blair, previous heads of the school were: G.H. Elliott and R. Herdman Smith. Nicholl was followed by R. Wallwork (1927–1945).

Initially, the school was based in the Girls High School building on the corner of Rolleston Avenue and Hereford Street, now part of The Art Centre after Girl's High moved to Cranmer Square. However, in 1929, a standalone site on the corner of Gloucester and Montreal Streets was purchased. In 1957, the art school was the first faculty of the university to move to Ilam where it was situated in Oakover House on the Ilam campus.

The following years, John Simpson was appointed senior lecturer and in 1961, aged 38, was made first professor of fine arts at the School of Art Canterbury University. Simpson headed the school for nearly thirty years, retiring in 1990. During his time as head of school, he oversaw its relocation on the Ilam campus in 1979 in what would be its first purpose-built structure. He also introduced graphic design in 1963 and film in 1966 as subjects. Art history was included in 1974, the Bachelor of Fine Arts degree introduced in 1982 and art theory available as a subject from 1985.

In 1991, the School of Fine Arts celebrated its Māori students, past and present, with an exhibition He Tol Tutanga Na Ngaa Toa O Te WhareWaananga O Waltaha. One of the earliest Māori artists to attend Ilam was Buck Nin (Ngati Raukawa), who trained under Rudi Gopas and gained a Diploma of Fine Arts from Ilam in 1966 becoming the first Māori to graduate from the school.

Other Māori students who have graduated from the school include: Matt Pine 1962, Gavin Bishop (Waikato, Ngati Awa) 1964–1968, Jonathan Mane-Wheoki [Nga Puhi] 1966–1969, Eruera (Ted) Te Whiti Nia 1970–1973, Kura Te Waru-Rewiri (Nga Puhi) 1970–1973, Shane Cotton (Nga Puhi) 1985–1988, Peter Robinson (Kai Tahu) 1985–1988, Chris Heaphy (Ngai Tahu) 1987–1990, Darryn George [Ngapuhi) 198–1991 and John Walsh Aitanga a Hauiti/ New Zealand Irish 1973–1974.

== Staff ==
Since its inception, the staff of the school has largely been drawn from practising artists, many of whom were students at the school themselves. They have included: Archibald Nichol, Florence Atkins, Evelyn Page, Colin Lovell-Smith, Frances Shurrock, Cecil Kelly, Elizabeth Kelly, Sydney Lough Thompson, John Weeks, W.A. Sutton, Doris Lusk, Eileen Mayo, Tom Taylor, Rudi Gopas, Don Peebles, Maurice Askew, John Panting, Barry Cleavin, Quentin Macfarlane.

== Notable alumni ==
=== Early-20th century ===
Rita Angus, Leonard Booth, Grace Butler, William Baverstock, James Cook, Rhona Haszard, Rata Lovell-Smith, Ngaio Marsh, Owen Merton, Raymond McIntyre, Evelyn Polson (Evelyn Page), Daisy Osborn, Flora Scales, Olivia Spencer-Bower, William Thomas Trethewey.

=== 1920s to 1940s ===
Rita Angus, Kathleen Brown, Russell Clark, James Coe, Austen Deans, Margaret Frankel, Ivy Fife, Molly Macalister, Frances Rutherford, John Weeks, Toss Woolaston.

=== 1950s and 1960s ===
Philippa Blair, Philip Clairmont, John Coley, Barry Cleavin, Bill Culbert, Neil Dawson, Michael Dunn, Tony Fomison, Dick Frizzell, Roy Good, Gil Hanly, Patrick Hanly, Bill Hammond, Ronnie van Hout, Rosemary Johnson, Hamish Keith, Tom Kreisler, Vivian Lynn, Maria Olsen, Jonathan Mane-Wheoki, Quentin McFarlane, Trevor Moffat, Gaylene Preston, Philip Trusttum, Boyd Webb.

=== 1970s and 1980s ===
Bing Dawe, Denise Copeland, Seraphine Pick, Julia Morrison, Vincent Ward, Ruth Watson, Tim White.

=== 1990s to 2000s ===
Nina Oberg Humphries, Mahiriki Tangaroa.

== See also ==
- The Group, an art association started by former art students
