= Ivy Fife =

New Zealand artist (1905–1976)

Ivy Grace Fife
- Born: 1905; Christchurch, New Zealand
- Died: 1976 (aged 70–71)
- Education: Canterbury College School of Fine Art
- Known for: painting, portrait
- Notable work: 'Peter', 'Big Crate', 'Backyards', 'Sign of the Times T.A.B.'
- Spouse: Alan Forrester

Ivy Grace Fife (1903–1976), born Ivy Grace Hofmeister, was a New Zealand painter based in Christchurch and Canterbury. Known for her portraits, her work also includes landscapes and is reflective of life in Canterbury and the South Island of New Zealand.

Working in gouache, oils, watercolours, ink and wash, and pencil, she was influenced by W.A. Sutton and a contemporary of Olivia Spencer Bower and Russell Clark.

== Education ==
Fife's early education included Elmwood School and Christchurch Girls' High School. In 1920, Fife enrolled in the Canterbury College School of Fine Art and after graduation continued her association with the school, including as Lecturer in Design, until her retirement in 1959. While at the school she worked with Cecil Kelly, Archibald Nicholl, F. A. Shurrock, Richard Wallwork and Leonard Booth.

== Exhibitions ==
Fife's work has been included in several art society exhibitions at Christchurch, Dunedin, Invercargill and Nelson, as well as the Gallery of the New Zealand Academy in Wellington. In 1958, five of her paintings were included in an exhibition by the Auckland City Art Gallery entitled Eight New Zealand Painters, exhibiting alongside W. A. Sutton, Milan Mrkusich, Rita Angus, Clifford Murray, Michael Nicholson, Sydney Thompson, and Dennis Knight Turner. The exhibition toured cities and towns throughout the country and provided public exposure to the New Zealand painters involved. Fife has been part of several exhibitions at the Christchurch Art Gallery Te Puna o Waiwhetu including: One Hundred New Zealand Painters (1965); A Harbour View (1989); About Town (1995); 40 out of 40: Canterbury Painters 1958–1998 (1997–98). Although she never had a solo show while alive, in 1977 the McDougall Art Gallery (now Christchurch Art Gallery Te Puna o Waiwhetu) hosted an exhibition of her work entitled Ivy Fife Retrospective 1938–1976.

== Positions held ==
Ivy Fife was a member and Council Member of the Canterbury Society of Arts from 1949 to 1966, and a member of the Advisory Committee of the Robert McDougall Art Gallery.
