= Rhona Haszard =

New Zealand artist (1901–1931)

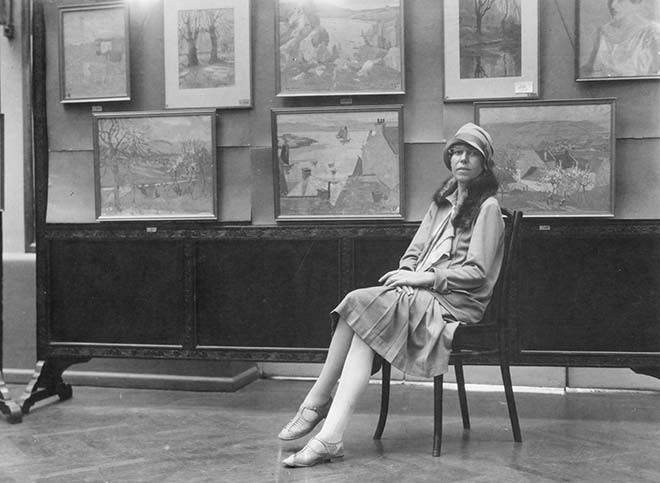
- Haszard at an exhibition of her paintings in Claridge's Hotel, Alexandria, which ran 9–16 December 1928. Two of the visible works are Spring in the Marne Valley and Early Morning at Camaret.
- Born: 1901; Thames, New Zealand
- Died: 1931 (aged 29–30); Auckland, New Zealand
- Occupation: Artist

Alice Gwendoline Rhona Haszard (1901–1931) was a New Zealand artist.

== Biography ==
Haszard was born in Thames, New Zealand, one of the five children of Alice (née Wily), and Henry Douglas Morpeth Haszard, a surveyor, who worked for the Lands and Survey Department and later became a Commissioner of Crown Lands in 1910. As a result of her father's job the family moved often and lived in Auckland, Christchurch, Hokitika and Invercargill. Haszard was a pupil of artist Hugh Scott in Hokitika in 1910, and attended Southland Girls' High School. The family moved to Christchurch on her mother's death in 1918.

At the age of 18, Haszard enrolled at the Canterbury College School of Art, now the Ilam School of Fine Arts, joining a set of women artists that included Ngaio Marsh, Evelyn Page (née Polson), Rata Lovell-Smith (née Bird) and Olivia Spencer Bower. She was taught amongst others by Archibald Nicoll, the newly appointed head of the school.

Haszard was very bohemian. She dressed eccentrically, spoke positively of de facto relationships and advocated vegetarianism and unprocessed food.

In 1922, she married Ronald McKenzie, a teacher and fellow student. However, in 1925, she abandoned this marriage to run off with an ex-British Army officer Leslie Greener. After being confronted with society disapproval, the couple escaped to France in 1926. They settled in Paris and studied briefly at the Académie Julian. Haszard continued to paint landscapes and exhibited in Paris at the Paris Salon and, during 1927, in London with the Society of Women Artists and in Cairo as well as sending work back to be exhibited in New Zealand.

The couple completed numerous painting trips to the Channel Islands, Cyprus and Greece. In 1927, Greener was employed by Victoria College, Alexandria, Egypt to teach art. In 1928 Haszard had a serious accident that left her with a back injury and she returned to London to seek medical treatment in 1929 and 1930. However she remained committed to painting and to the bohemian art and theatre circles. She returned to Alexandria in 1930. She was killed when she fell off a four-storey tower at Victoria College, Alexandria in 1931 the night after her last exhibition opened. She was 30.

== Gallery ==
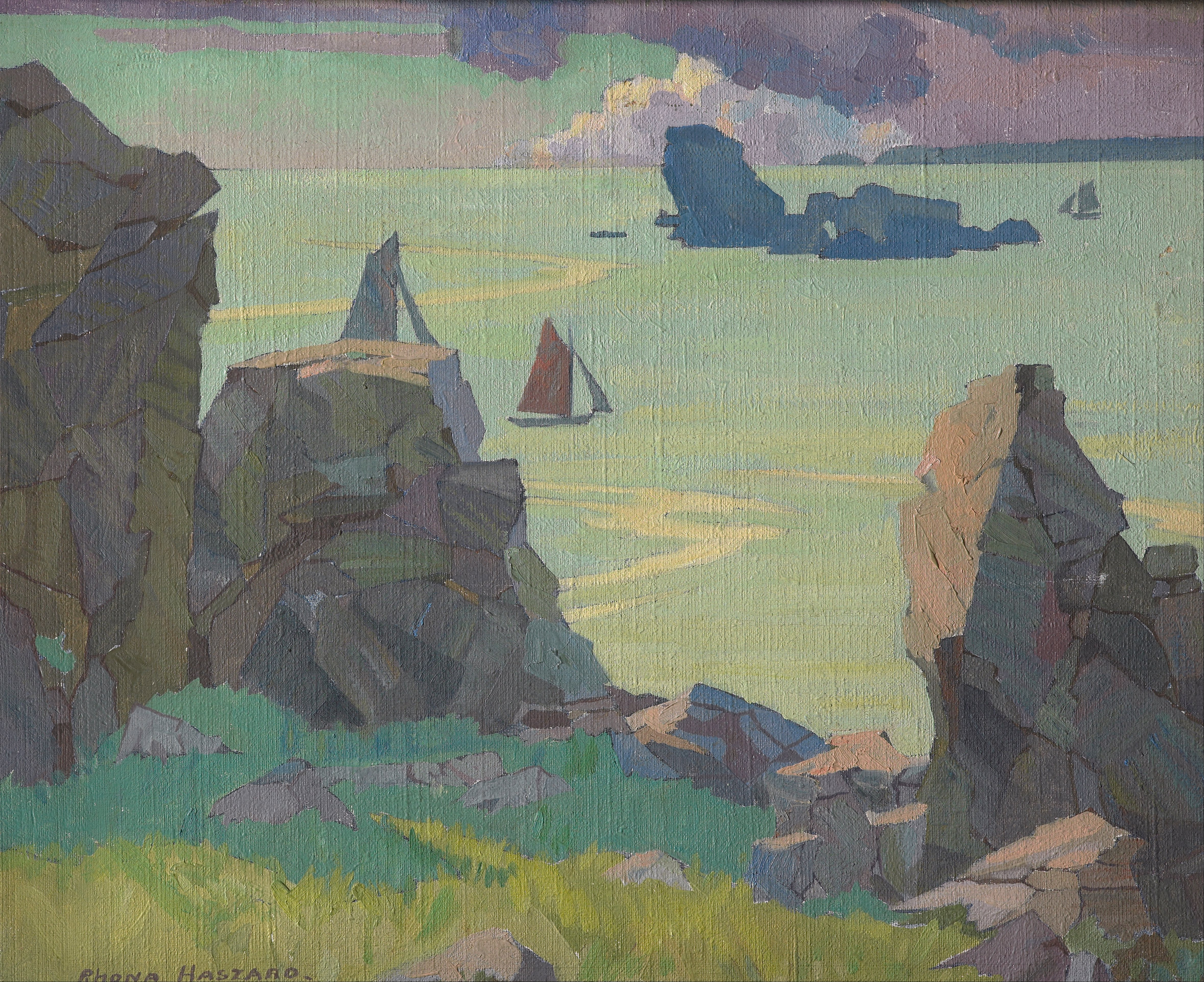
Finistère (1926)

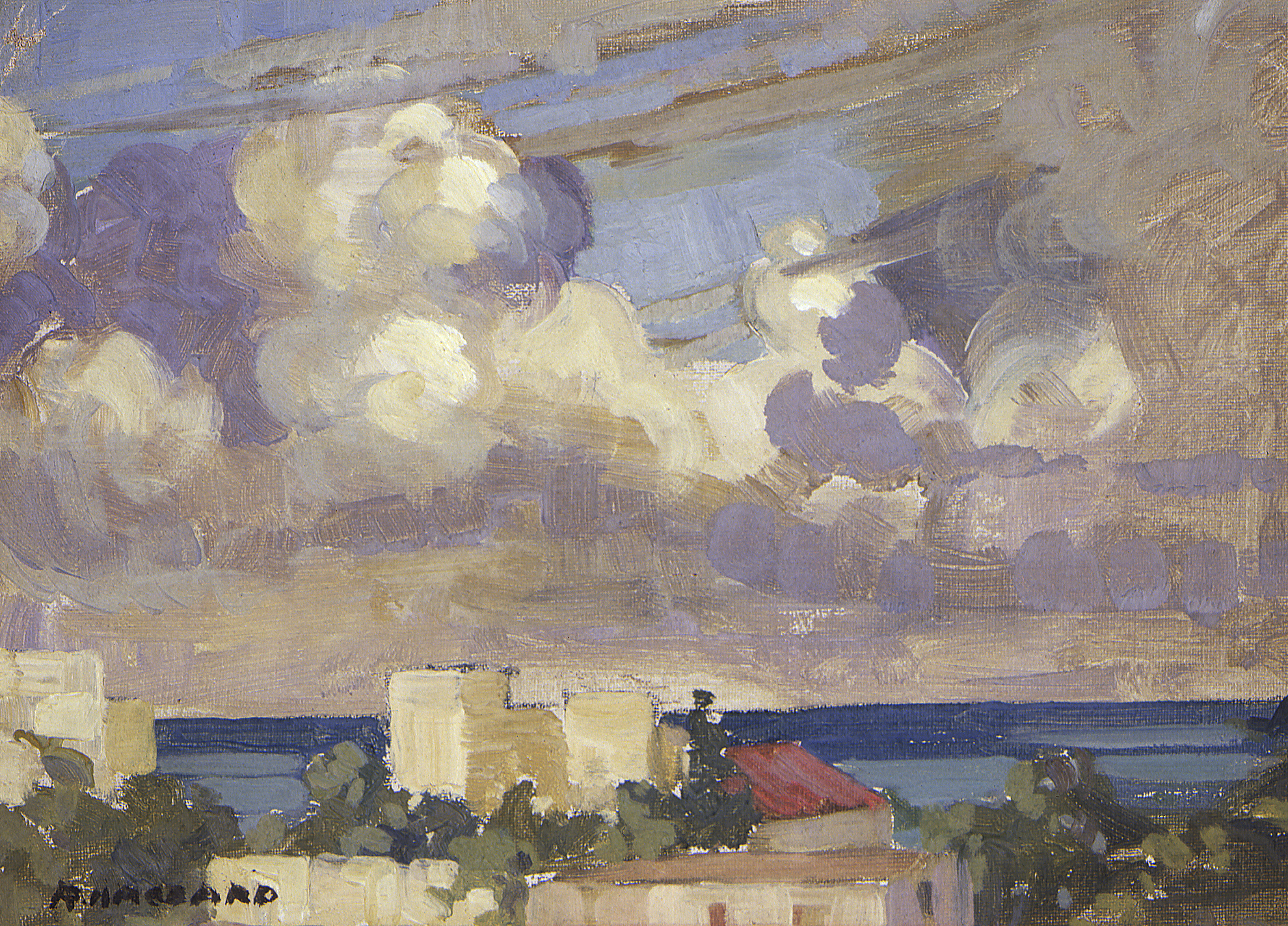
In Alexandria, Egypt (1930)

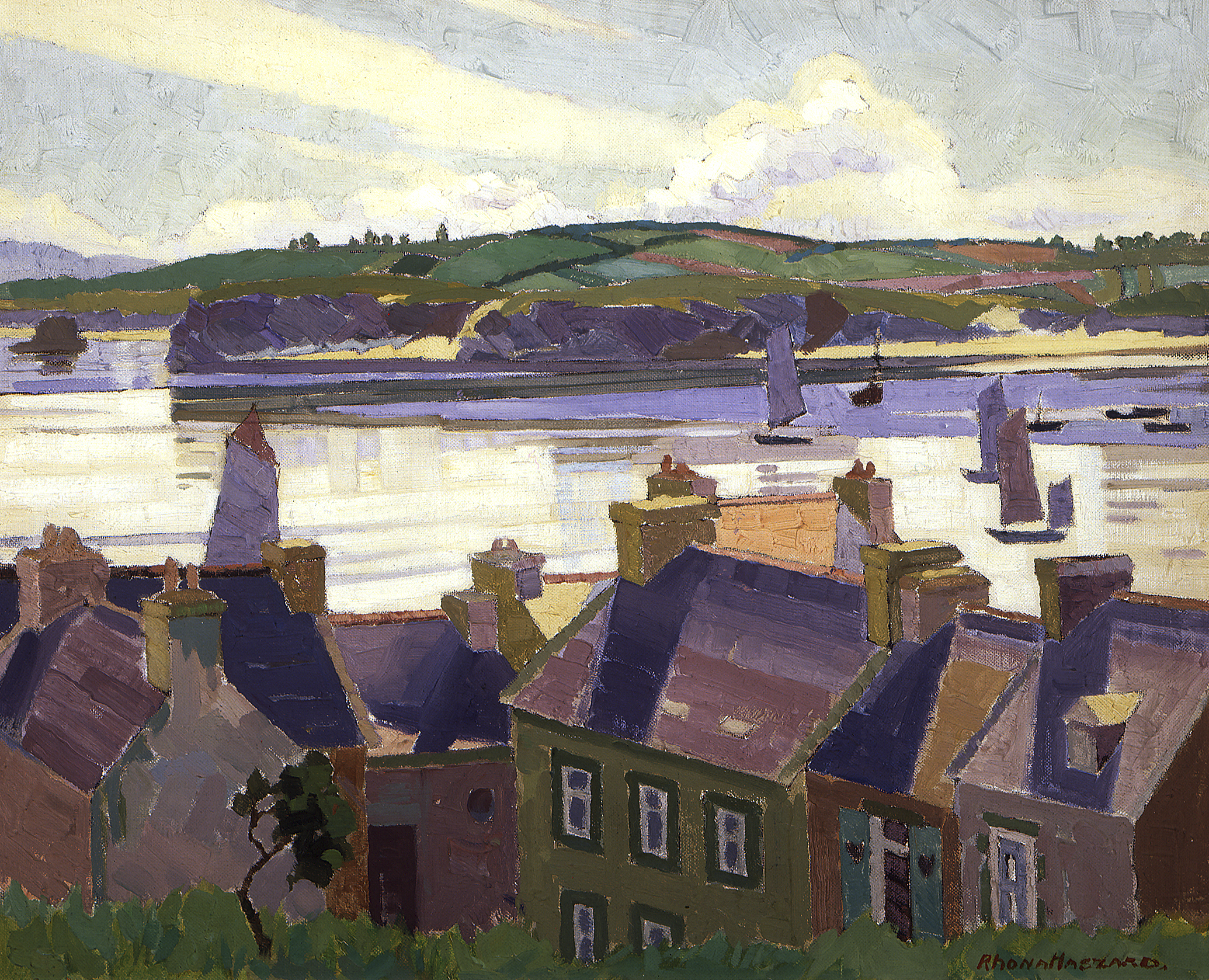
Morning calm, Camaret (1926)

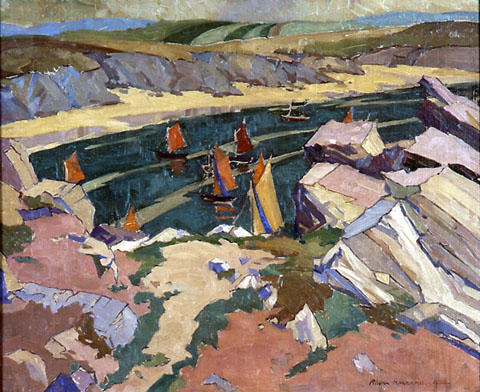
Sardine Fleet, Brittany (1926)

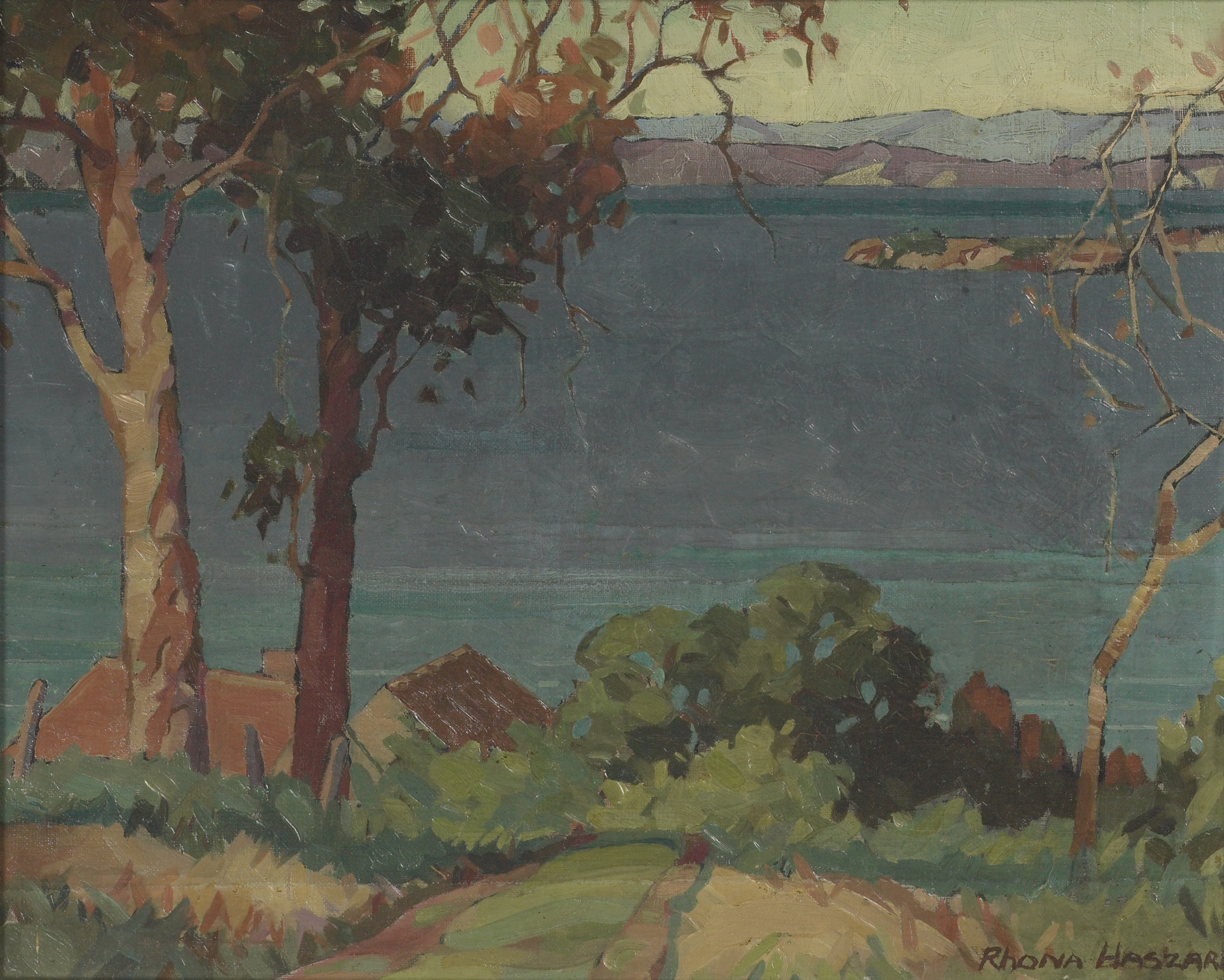
Across the Firth of Thames (c. 1925)

== List of works ==
- Works from the collection of the Museum of New Zealand Te Papa Tongarewa
