= Bill Sutton (artist) =

New Zealand artist (1917–2000)

Bill Sutton CBE
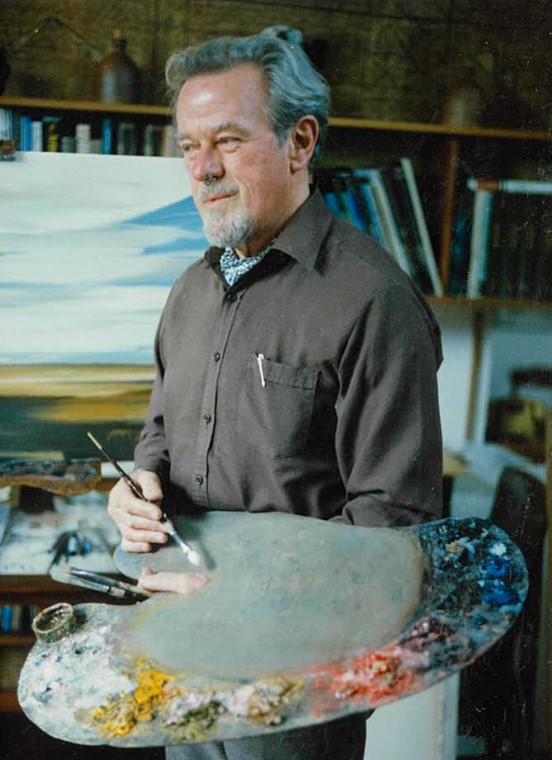
- Bill Sutton in his studio, 1983
- Born: William Alexander Sutton; 1 March 1917; Christchurch, New Zealand
- Died: 23 January 2000 (aged 82)

William Alexander Sutton CBE (1 March 1917 – 23 January 2000) was a New Zealand portrait and landscape artist.

== History ==
Sutton was born in Sydenham, Christchurch and attended Christchurch Boys High School. He became interested in art at an early age and was first taught in art classes by Ivy Fife and later at night classes with Colin S. Lovell-Smith. In 1934 he began his studies at the Canterbury College School of Art (since 1956, the University of Canterbury School of Fine Arts) and was awarded his Diploma of Fine Arts in 1937. He was tutored by many well-known Canterbury artists, including Evelyn Page, Archibald Nicoll and Cecil Kelly. In 1941 Sutton was found unfit for overseas service in World War II and served as a conscript in the Home Force of the New Zealand Army who used his art skills for camouflaging activities. A year later his name was put forward for the role of New Zealand’s war artist but the role was filled by Russell Clark. Sutton then replaced Clark as an illustrator for Korero the New Zealand Army magazine. In 1945 Sutton began a part-time teaching position at the Canterbury College of Art.

Two years later Sutton travelled to London on a Mural Scholarship where he studied for a time at the Anglo-French Centre in St John's Wood. He returned to New Zealand in 1949 to take up a permanent teaching position at the Canterbury University College School of Art and in 1959 was appointed senior lecturer. Sutton continued to teach at the school until his retirement in 1979 and continued painting until 1993. A number of students of note who passed through the art school during Sutton’s tenure have commented on his influence including Pat Hanly and Jonathan Mane-Wheoki.

=== 20 Templar Street ===
In 1963, Sutton’s Art School colleague Tom Taylor designed a house for him at 20 Templar Street in the Christchurch suburb of Richmond. The house included Sutton’s studio and he painted most of his works there. The house was purchased by Neil Roberts, a former curator of the Robert McDougall Art Gallery, whose intention was to gift it for an artist in residence scheme. Following the 2011 Christchurch earthquake the house was purchased by the Canterbury Earthquake Recovery Authority on behalf of the Crown because it was in the Residential Red Zone. The Crown then sold the house back to the Christchurch City Council for $1. Since 2022 it has become an artist residency run by the Sutton Heritage House and Garden Trust. The Sutton House was also listed as a Historic Place Category 1 by Heritage New Zealand in 2022.

== Painting style and selected works ==
Portrait painting of Eric Raymond Hudson by Sutton

During the 1940s and 1950s Sutton followed in the footsteps of fellow Canterbury artists, such as Rita Angus, Colin McCahon, Rata Lovell-Smith and Louise Henderson, to develop his own distinctive interpretation of the Canterbury landscape. He continued to explore this landscape through both realist and abstract interpretations for the rest of his life. Some selected examples:

- Nor’wester in the Cemetery 1950 In An Introduction to New Zealand Painting art historian Gordon H Brown called this painting, ‘a fitting climax to the Canterbury School of landscape painters who …had sought to identify themselves with the physical appearance of the area.’
- Saint Sebastian 1951 In locating the martyr in a Canterbury landscape, curator Ron Brownson proposed that the work, ‘recalls the suffering of New Zealand’s armed forces during World War II.’ The model for the painting was Sutton’s teaching colleague Tom Taylor.
- Homage to Frances Hodgkins 1951. When the Christchurch City Council declined to purchase Frances Hodgkins’ Pleasure Garden, Sutton responded with a painting based on Homage to Cezanne (1900) by the French painter Maurice Denis. Sutton substituted the artists in that painting by supporters of the Pleasure Garden purchase including Doris Lusk, Colin McCahon, Olivia Spencer-Bower and John Oakley. The Hodgkins’ painting was eventually purchased, but Sutton’s homage has not survived.
- (Untitled) Taylor's Mistake 1957. One of Sutton’s most popular paintings is of the bachs at Taylor's Mistake near Christchurch with the brown hills in the background. It is in the collection of the Christchurch Art Gallery.
- Grasses 1967 In this series of paintings, Sutton turned to abstraction derived from nature. The approach confused some contemporary critics.
- Threshold IV 1973 The Threshold series is based on the river terraces at the base of the Southern Alps. Another painting in the series, Threshold VII, was the first work purchased by the Chartwell Collection.
- 1977 Te Tihi O Kahukura and Sky X One of eight works in a series depicting the Canterbury landscape in a variety of moods.

== Exhibitions ==
Like many of his Christchurch peers, Sutton was a regular exhibitor with the informal New Zealand association The Group. He first showed in the 1946 Group Show with Apricot Orchard and then 20 more times until the final exhibition of The Group in 1977 in which he exhibited Te Tihi O Kahukura and Sky No. 5 (The Citadel of the Rainbow God) .

Other key exhibitions include:

- 1970 First solo show in Christchurch, CSA Gallery
- 1973 Threshold, Stewart Mair Gallery, Canterbury Society of Arts.
- 1974 Italian Watercolours Robert McDougall Art Gallery
- 1978 Te Tihi o Kakuhura CSA Gallery

A number of large survey exhibitions have been devoted to Sutton’s work. The first, “Bill” William Alexander Sutton: Retrospective 1917–1971, was curated by David Millar, Director of the Dowse Art Gallery, in 1972. This exhibition of 42 works toured nationally in 1973. A large Sutton retrospective with a detailed catalogue was mounted by Christchurch Art Gallery Te Puna o Waiwhetū in 2003.

== Commissions ==
- 1950 (with Russell Clark) Murals for the Canterbury Museum celebrating the centennial of the province and Lyttleton Harbour in 1851.
- 1957 Design for the Riccarton High School Crest.
- 1959 Mural for the Children’s Dental Clinic (with Ted Bracey), Colombo Street, Christchurch.
- 1962 Mural at Linwood High School as a memorial to art teacher Mr P. L. Weenink. The mural was destroyed by fire in 1975.
- 1963 Mural for Bank of New South Wales, Hereford Street, Christchurch showing industry and sources of income.
- 1978 Stained glass windows for the North Transept of Christchurch Cathedral.

=== Notable subjects painted ===
Between 1954 and 1990 Sutton was commissioned to paint over 80 portraits. Some of the notable people represented include:

- 1954 Alice Candy Warden of Helen Connon Hall, Christchurch
- 1965 Dr Roger Duff Director of the Canterbury Museum
- 1971 Mr A. R. Low Governor of the Reserve Bank of New Zealand
- 1971 Rt Rev. Allan Pyatt Bishop of Christchurch
- 1971 John Cawte Beaglehole historian and academic
- 1978 James Fletcher businessman
- 1982 Sir Michael Fowler Mayor of Wellington
- 1990 Sir Hamish Hay Mayor of Christchurch

== Awards ==
- 1973 Queen Elizabeth II Arts Council Fellowship.
- 1980 Sutton was appointed a Commander of the Order of the British Empire, for services to art.
- 1984 The New Zealand Academy presented the Governor General’s Award to Sutton.
- 2009 Sutton was commemorated as one of the Twelve Local Heroes, and a bronze bust of him unveiled outside the Christchurch Arts Centre.

== Additional Reading ==
- Christchurch Art Gallery: W.A.Sutton
- S.M.V. Rennie W.A.Sutton and the Canterbury Landscape Master of Art History, University of Canterbury 1984
- Pat Unger Bill’s Story: a Portrait of W.A.Sutton Canterbury University Press 2009
- Pat Unger W.A.Sutton Painter Hazard Press, Christchurch, New Zealand 1994
- Pat Unger (ed) An Italian Sojourn Wily Publications 2011
