= Kathleen Browne (artist) =

New Zealand artist and teacher (1905–2007)

- Born: 1905; Christchurch, New Zealand
- Died: 14 May 2007 (aged 101–102); Hampstead, London
- Education: Canterbury College School of Art; Chelsea School of Art; Royal College of Art
- Known for: Painting
- Spouse: Marian Kratochwil

Kathleen Browne (1905 – 14 May 2007) was a New Zealand-born artist and teacher who established her artistic career in the United Kingdom.

== Biography ==
Browne was born in Christchurch in New Zealand and studied at the Canterbury College School of Art between 1920 and 1924. Browne taught in New Zealand before, in 1931, moving to England where she trained at the Chelsea School of Art during 1932 and 1933 and then at the Royal College of Art in 1934. In 1947, she won a bronze medal at the Paris Salon. Browne taught art at various school and colleges until 1949 when she established her own school with her future husband the artist Marian Kratochwil, (1906–1997), in Chelsea. In 1950, she was part of a three-artist exhibition at the Prince Galitzine Gallery. She retired from teaching in 1979 to focus on her own painting, particularly of portraits. She and her husband shared a retrospective exhibition at the Polish Cultural Institute in 1994. She was a member of the Senefelder Club of lithographers and printmakers and the Graphic Arts Society. She was also a member of the Women's International Art Club and regularly exhibited with the Royal Academy, the Royal Scottish Academy and the Royal Society of British Artists. The British Museum holds a number of prints and drawings by Browne. The National Portrait Gallery in London has her portrait of Arnold Dolmetsch in its collection.
