= Alice Candy =

New Zealand academic and historian (1888–1977)

Alice Muriel Flora Candy (9 July 1888 – 18 May 1977) was a New Zealand teacher, academic and historian.

Born in West Oxford, New Zealand on 9 July 1888, Candy attended Christchurch Girls' High School and got a Junior Scholarship.

She earned a Bachelor of Arts in 1910 and secured Senior Scholarship in economics, leading to a Master of Arts with honors in political science in 1911. After leaving Canterbury College (now University of Canterbury) she taught at several schools including Chilton Saint James School in Lower Hutt.

Candy was appointed to lecture history at the college in December 1920, making her the second woman academic at the institution, after biologist Elizabeth Herriott.

She worked closely with James Hight, including writing the 1927 A short history of the Canterbury College (University of New Zealand) with a register of graduates and associates of the college; it was to be her only major publication; with her background in school teaching, she specialised in teaching rather than research. At the time between a quarter and a third of students were women, and Candy played an active role in caring for them, being warden of Helen Connon Hall, an all-women hall of residence. By the time of her retirement in 1948 she had risen to senior lecturer.

After her retirement she served on the University Council.

Candy never married. She died on 18 May 1977 in Christchurch. Candy lives on in the name of a building on campus and in a W. A. Sutton portrait in the collection of the university. The Christchurch Art Gallery holds some preparatory sketches for the portrait.

== Roles ==
- Foundation member of the Canterbury branch of the New Zealand Federation of University Women .
- President Canterbury branch of the New Zealand Federation of University Women (1926–27).
- Vice-president New Zealand Federation of University Women (1929).
- Delegate National Council of Women of New Zealand (1926–27, 1928–29) .
- Exchange Lecturer, Bedford College for women, University of London, in 1928–29
- University of Canterbury Council (1954 to 1957)
