= Leslie Greener =

Herbert Leslie Greener (February 13, 1900 - December 8, 1974) was a soldier, writer, artist, journalist, and egyptologist. He was born in Constantia, South Africa. He studied at Felsted School from 1914 to 1917, then Sandhurst, before joining the Indian Army.

His first marriage was to painter Rhona Haszard. The couple lived on the premises of Victoria College in Alexandria, Egypt, where he taught art and French.

He wrote about his time as a prisoner of the Japanese while serving in the Australian Army during World War II.

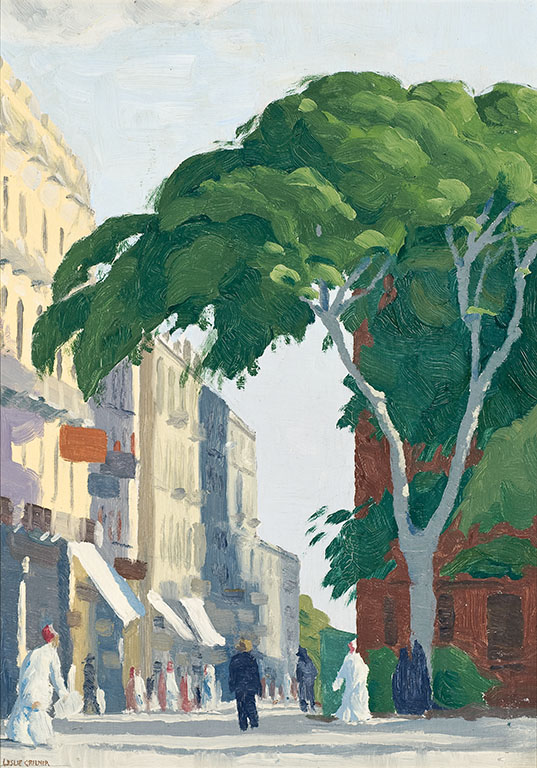
Leslie Greener, Rue de la Poste, Alexandria (c.1929), oil on canvas, Collection: Christchurch Art Gallery Te Puna o Waiwhetu, purchased 2010.

He lived in Hobart, Tasmania.

== Published works ==
- No Time to Look Back, Victor Gollancz, 1950
- Moon Ahead, Viking Press, New York (1951) hb/William Pène du Bois
- The Wizard Boatman of the Nile and Other Tales from Egypt, George G Harrap, London (1957)
- High Dam over Nubia (1962)
- The Discovery of Egypt (1966)
