= Raymond McIntyre =

New Zealand artist and art critic (1879–1933)

Raymond Francis McIntyre
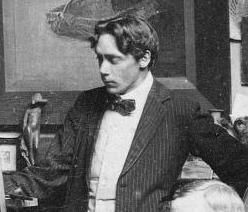
- McIntyre circa 1912.
- Born: 5 February 1879; Christchurch, Canterbury, New Zealand
- Died: 24 September 1933 (aged 54); London, England
- Occupations: Artist, art critic

Raymond Francis McIntyre (5 February 1879 – 24 September 1933) was a New Zealand artist and art critic, best known for his superb painting and acute awareness of contemporary trends in European art of the early twentieth century.

== Early life ==
McIntyre was born in Christchurch, New Zealand on 5 February 1879. He was one of seven children born to George McIntyre, mayor of New Brighton in 1902. From early childhood, McIntyre suffered from poor health and was inclined not to socialize easily. However, he did enjoy several friendships with writers and musicians, playing the cello himself. His formal education concluded at the age of fifteen, wherein he began art studies at the Canterbury School of Art under the tutelage of Herdman Smith and Alfred Walsh. He took a five-year break from training between 1901 and 1906, during which time he shared a studio in Cathedral Square with Leonard Booth and Sydney Thompson.

== Career ==
McIntyre resumed his art studies at a more advanced level when he returned to the art school in 1906. Little is known about McIntyre prior to 1909, though his artistic knowledge and education was limited to what he learned at the Canterbury School of Art, and the local artists of Christchurch. His artistic activity in New Zealand mostly focused on painting, with a few illustrations for his own books.

In 1909, McIntyre relocated to England, settling into a rented studio on Cheyne Walk. In 1910, he began art studies at the Westminster Technical Institute under William Nicholson and Walter Sickert, as he was drawn to the Pre-Raphaelite painting style.

Although shy and withdrawn, McIntyre exhibited his work widely while living and studying in England. Exhibitions included the Thames Valley Art Club in 1910 and the London Goupil Gallery in 1911. After the war, McIntyre continued to paint. In October 1918 he held a large exhibition at the Eldar Gallery; and in 1921, as a member of the Monarro Group, exhibited in the Goupil Gallery alongside Paul Signac, M.L. Pissarro and Lemaitre.

McIntyre spent several years as an art critic for the Architectural Review. He reviewed the work of artists such as Cézanne, Heckel, Signac and Hodler. McIntyre had an exhibition accepted with the Royal Academy in 1924, and in 1926 McIntyre stopped exhibiting.

== Death and legacy ==
McIntyre died of a strangulated hernia on 24 September 1933 at age 54 in London, England.

His work is represented in New Zealand's National Art Gallery, the Hocken Collections, Christchurch Art Gallery Te Puna o Waiwhetū and other major galleries.

== Gallery ==
Works by Raymond McIntyre

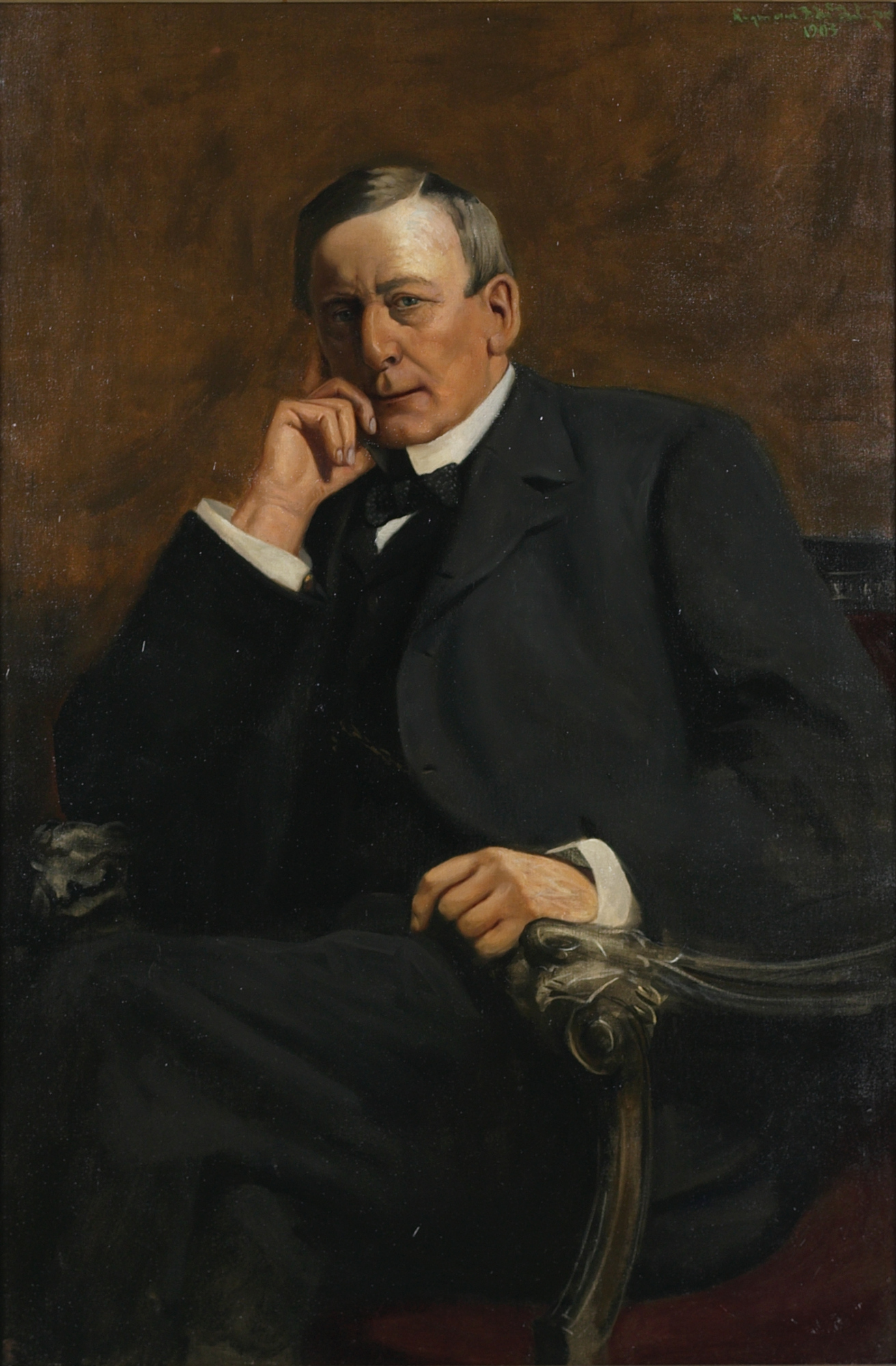
"Portrait of William Rolleston", circa 1903 (Te Papa, Wellington)

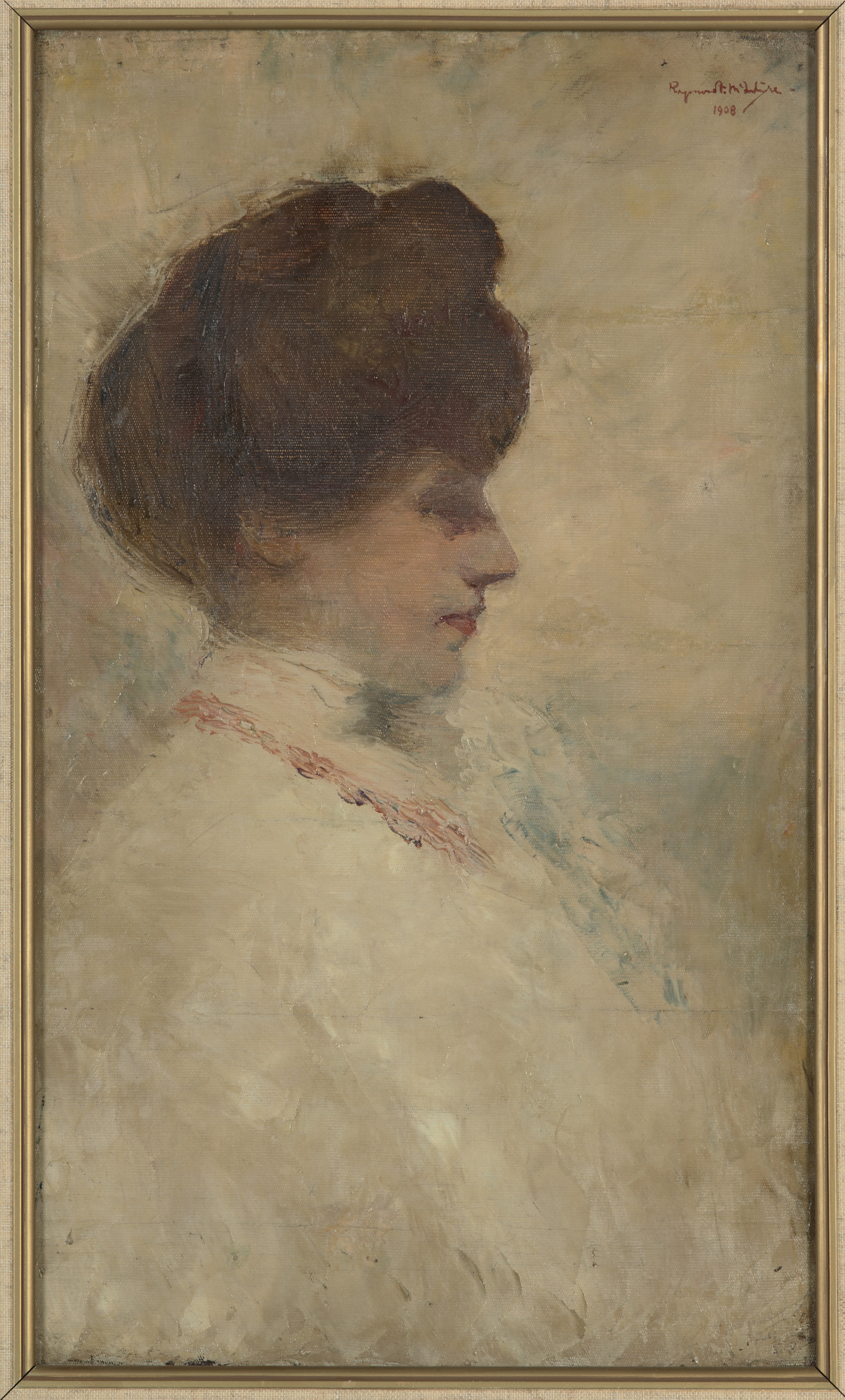
"Portrait of Doris McIntyre", circa 1908 (Te Papa, Wellington)

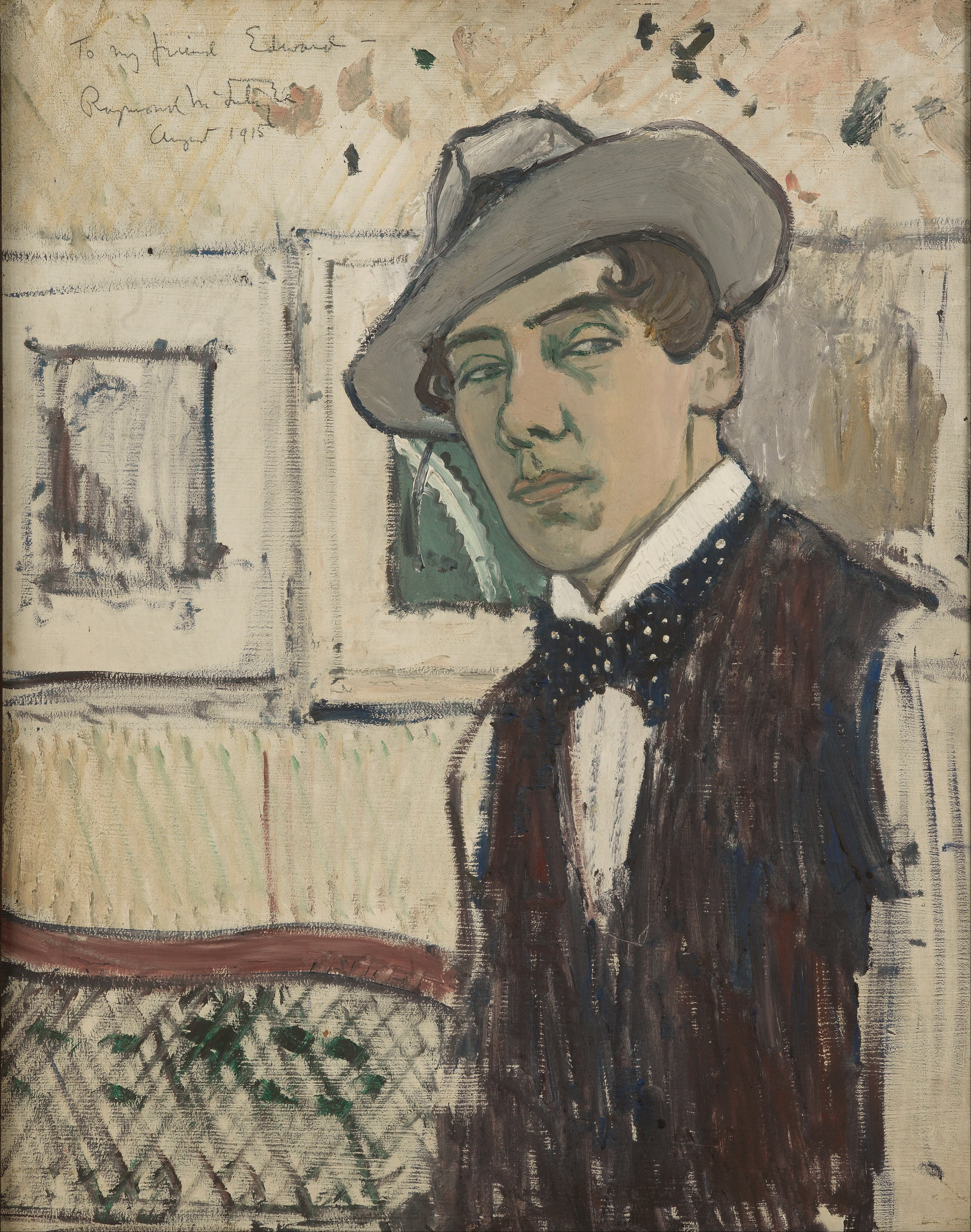
Self portrait, 1915 (Te Papa, Wellington)

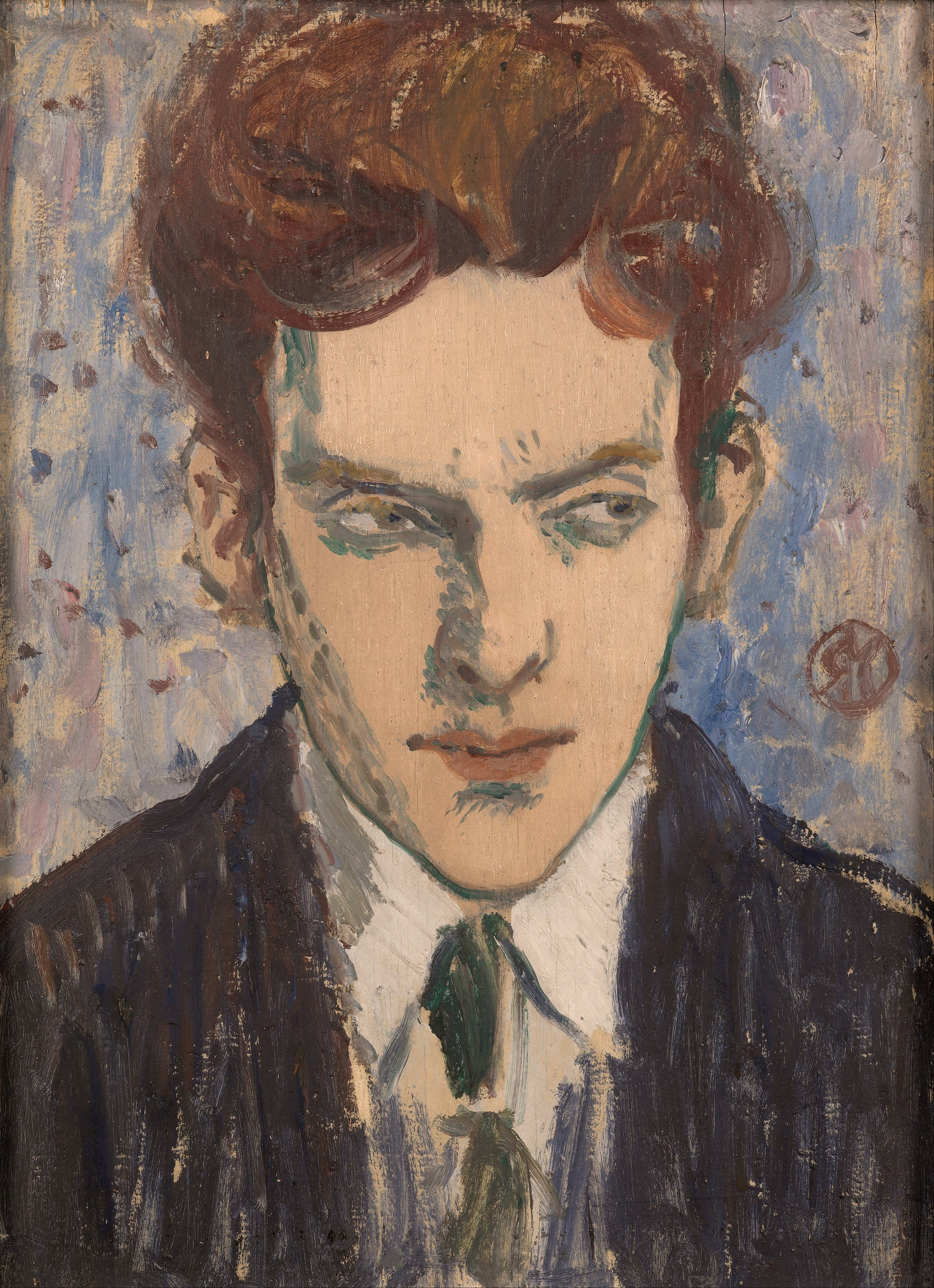
Edward McKnight Kauffer, circa 1915 (Te Papa, Wellington)

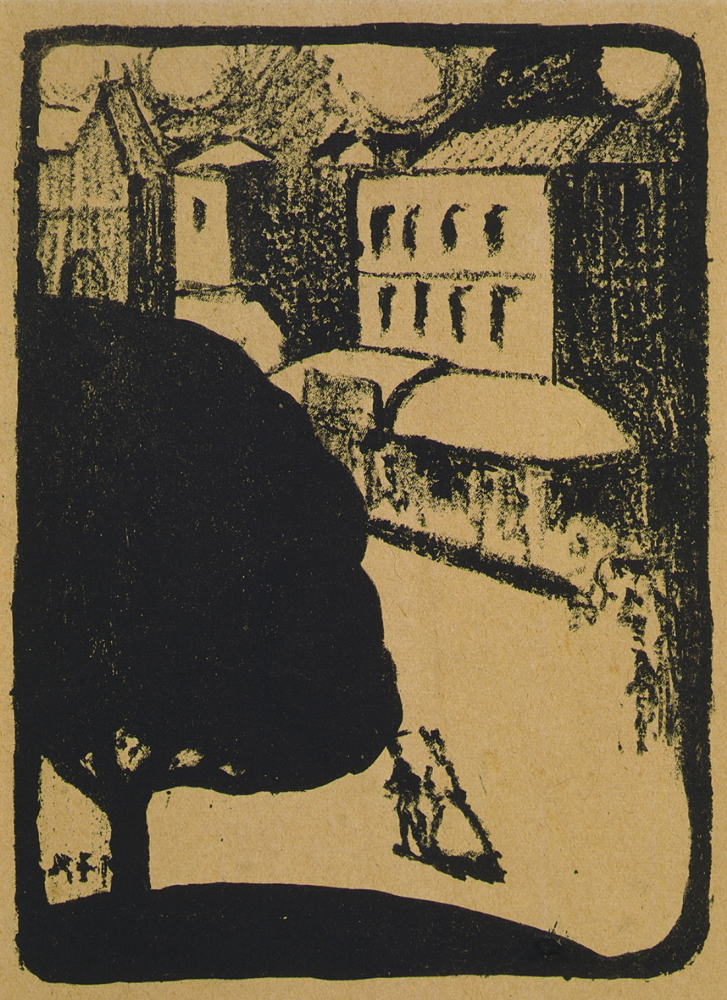
"Street scene", circa 1917 (Te Papa, Wellington)

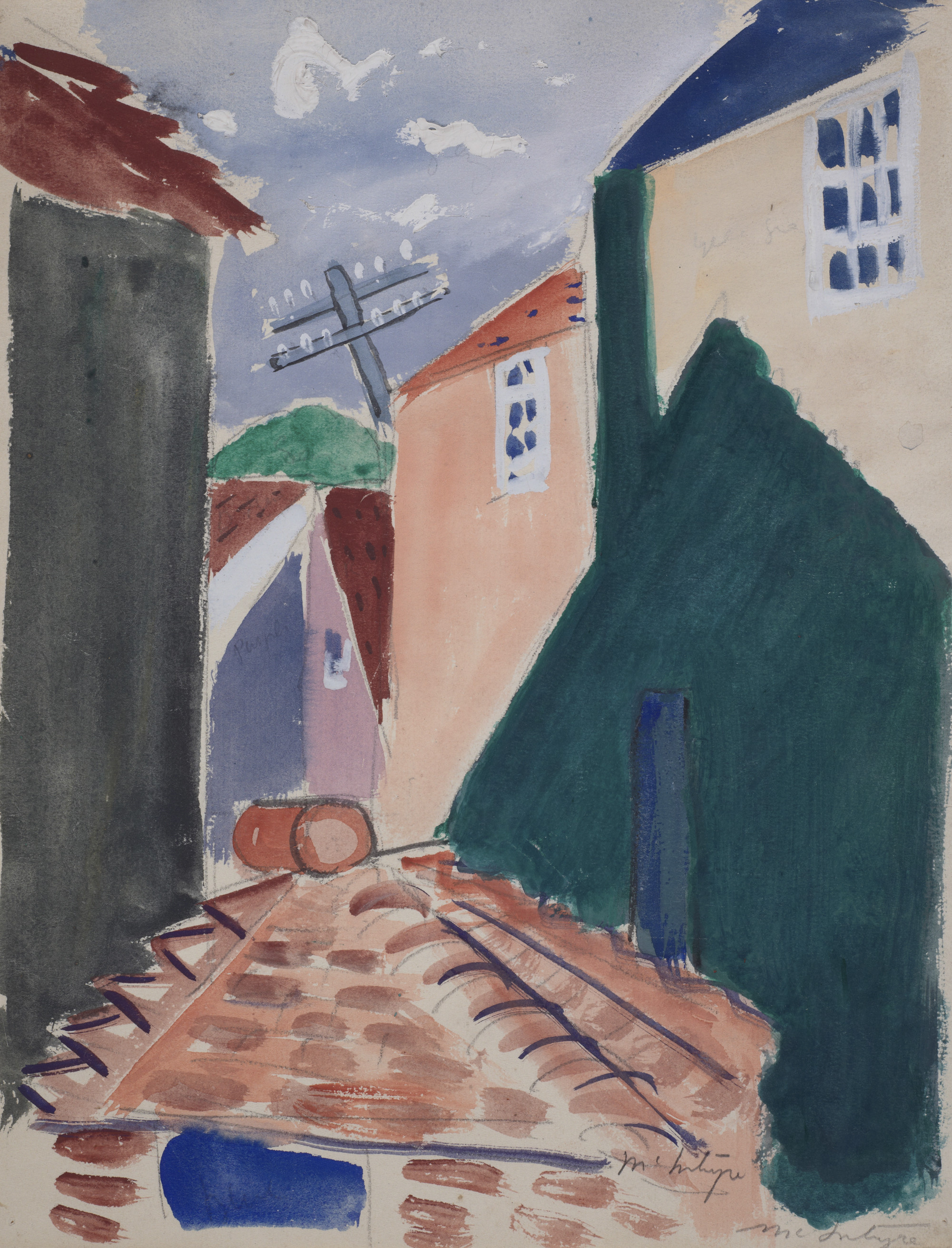
"Scene in Berkshire", circa 1920 (Te Papa, Wellington)

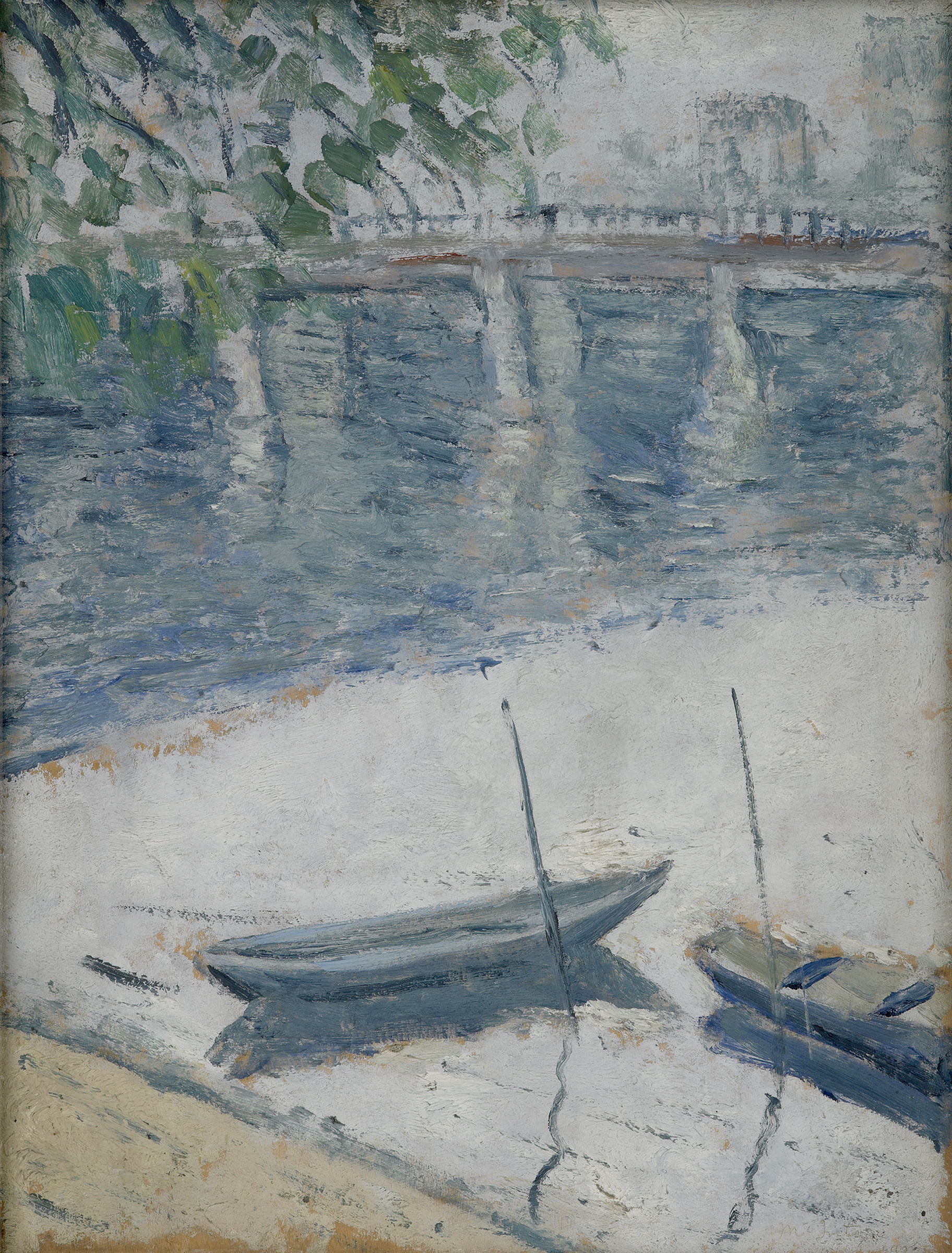
"Morning on the Seine", circa 1921 (Te Papa, Wellington)

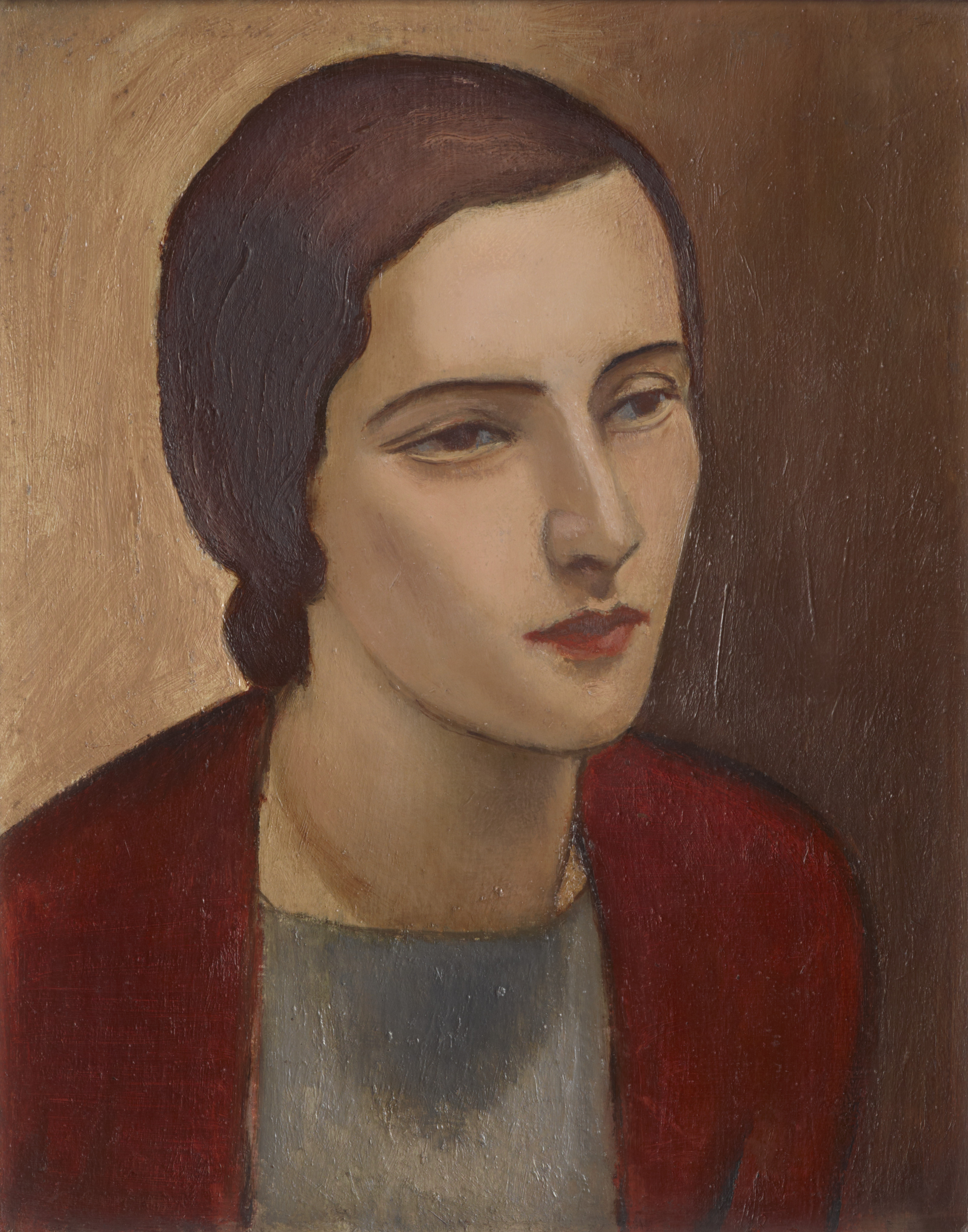
"Head of a girl", circa 1922 (Te Papa, Wellington)
