= Russell Clark (artist) =

New Zealand illustrator, sculptor and university lecturer (1905–1966)

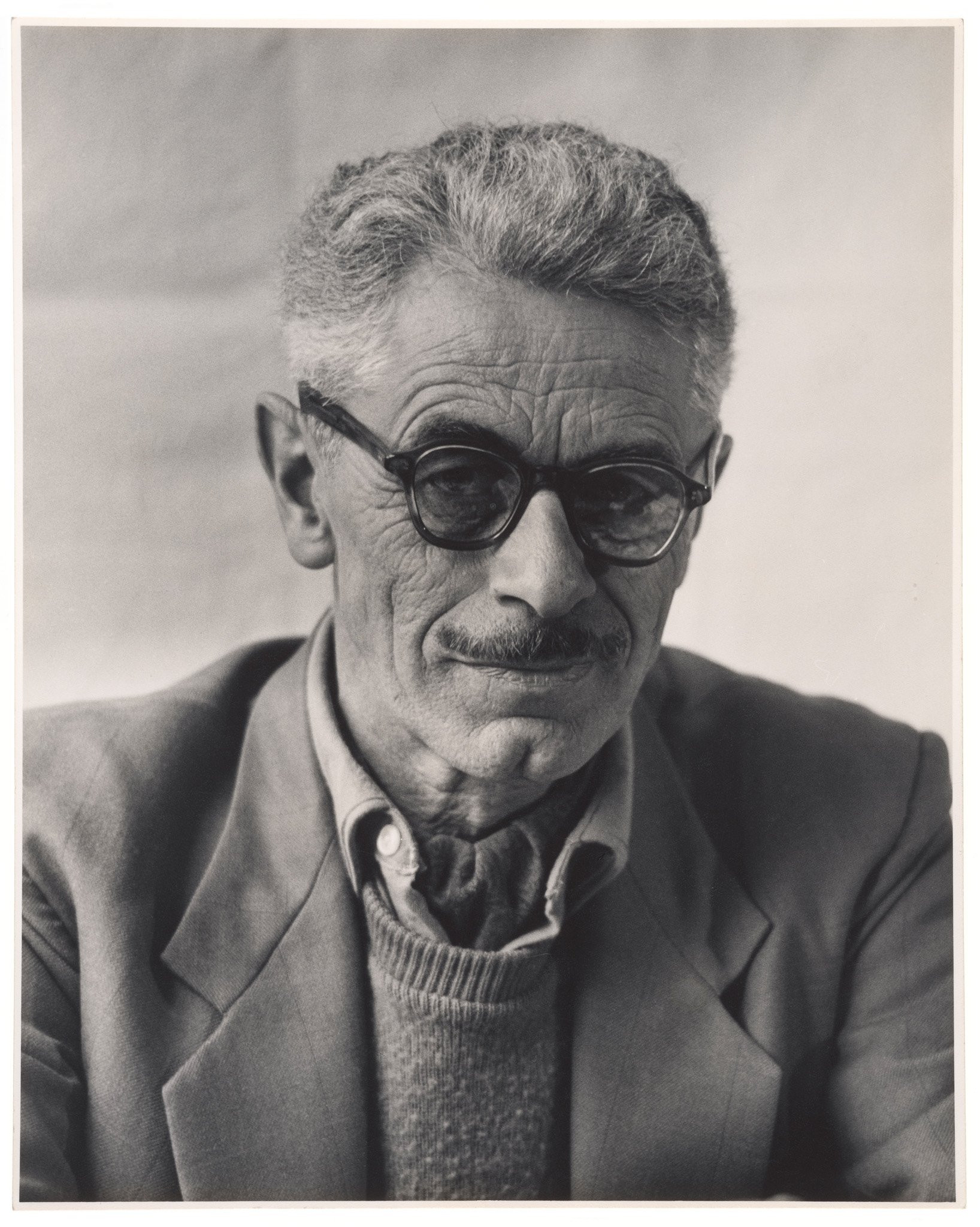
- Russell Clark (Russell Clark Archives, Robert and Barbara Stewart Library and Archives, Christchurch Art Gallery Te Puna o Waiwhetū)
- Born: 27 August 1905; Christchurch
- Died: 29 July 1966 (aged 60)
- Education: Canterbury College School of Art
- Known for: Sculpture, murals, paintings and illustration
- Notable work: Family Group (1960), initially commissioned for the Hay’s Shopping Centre in Christchurch; now part of the Canterbury University collection
- Movement: Early New Zealand Modernism

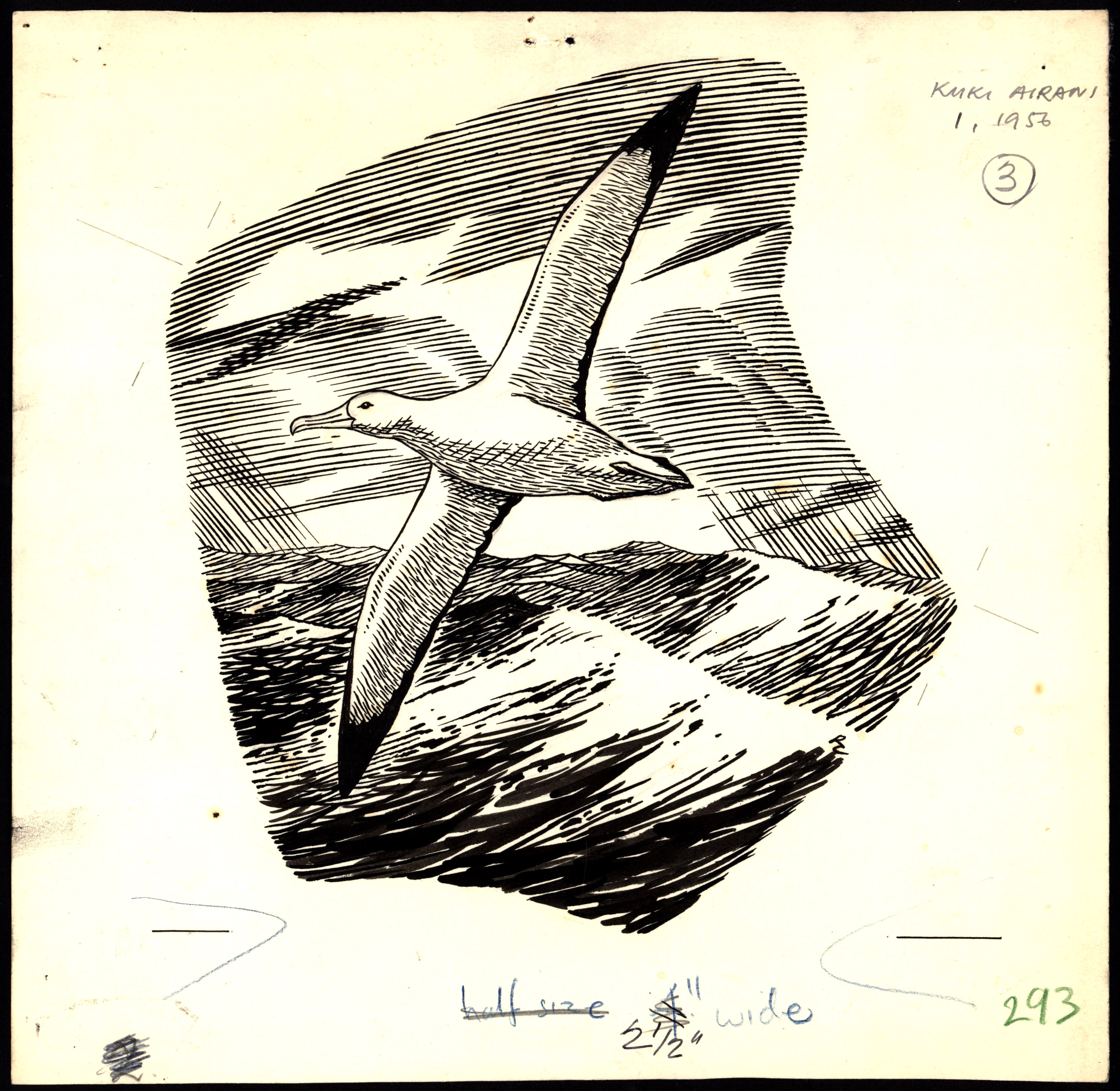
Seabird, by Russell Clark, for Samoan school publication

Russell Stuart Cedric Clark (27 August 1905 – 29 July 1966) was a New Zealand artist, illustrator, sculptor and university lecturer.

== Early life ==
Clark was born in Christchurch on 27 August 1905 into a family with a strong interest in art. His mother was recognised as a person with a sophisticated sense of colour and his father, a plumber and tinsmith, was an accomplished watercolourist. At an early age Clark was already known to be creating his own cartoons. After attending the Christchurch Boys' High School he went on to study at the Canterbury College School of Art from 1922 to 1928. and then to work in an advertising agency. Later he joined John McIndoe the printer and publisher in Dunedin as a commercial artist. During this period Clark used one of the studios to hold popular art classes. The classes offered commercial art, fine art and special juvenile classes on Saturday morning. His students included a number of Dunedin artists who went on to have successful art careers including Doris Lusk and Colin McCahon from 1933-35. McCahon remembered Clark as a 'splendid teacher' and recalled in particular one exercise where he arranged a pile of chalk boxes to demonstrate the handling of tones and volumes. In 1930 Clark married Eunice Ingham. He was a regular exhibitor with the Otago Art Society, in 1933 the Otago Daily Times reviewer describing him as 'the outstanding all round contributor to this year's gallery.'

In 1936 Clark painted a series of 28 panels for the City Hotel (later Elms Hotel) on Princes Street in Dunedin, owned at that time by the Masetti family. The panels depicted the 1860s Otago gold rush. The panels were smoke-damaged in a hotel fire in 1952, and retouched, although it is unclear which artist did the restoration work. The panels were moved to a Bannockburn winery after the hotel's closure in 1986, and then purchased by the Central Stories Museum and Art Gallery in Alexandra, which put them on display in 2026.

== The Wellington years ==
In 1937 Clark moved to Wellington to join the advertising agency Catts, Paterson, and Co. This move coincided with his being awarded a commission to produce a large scale mural for the New Zealand Centennial Exhibition building in Wellington. He was one of only three artists given this opportunity. Clark's three panel mural the Departure of the Tory from Plymouth, 1840 was positioned at the end of the foyer leading into the main exhibition hall. By using 'a border of kauri and oak leaves and English Tudor roses' Clark's mural highlighted the links between England and its Dominion New Zealand.

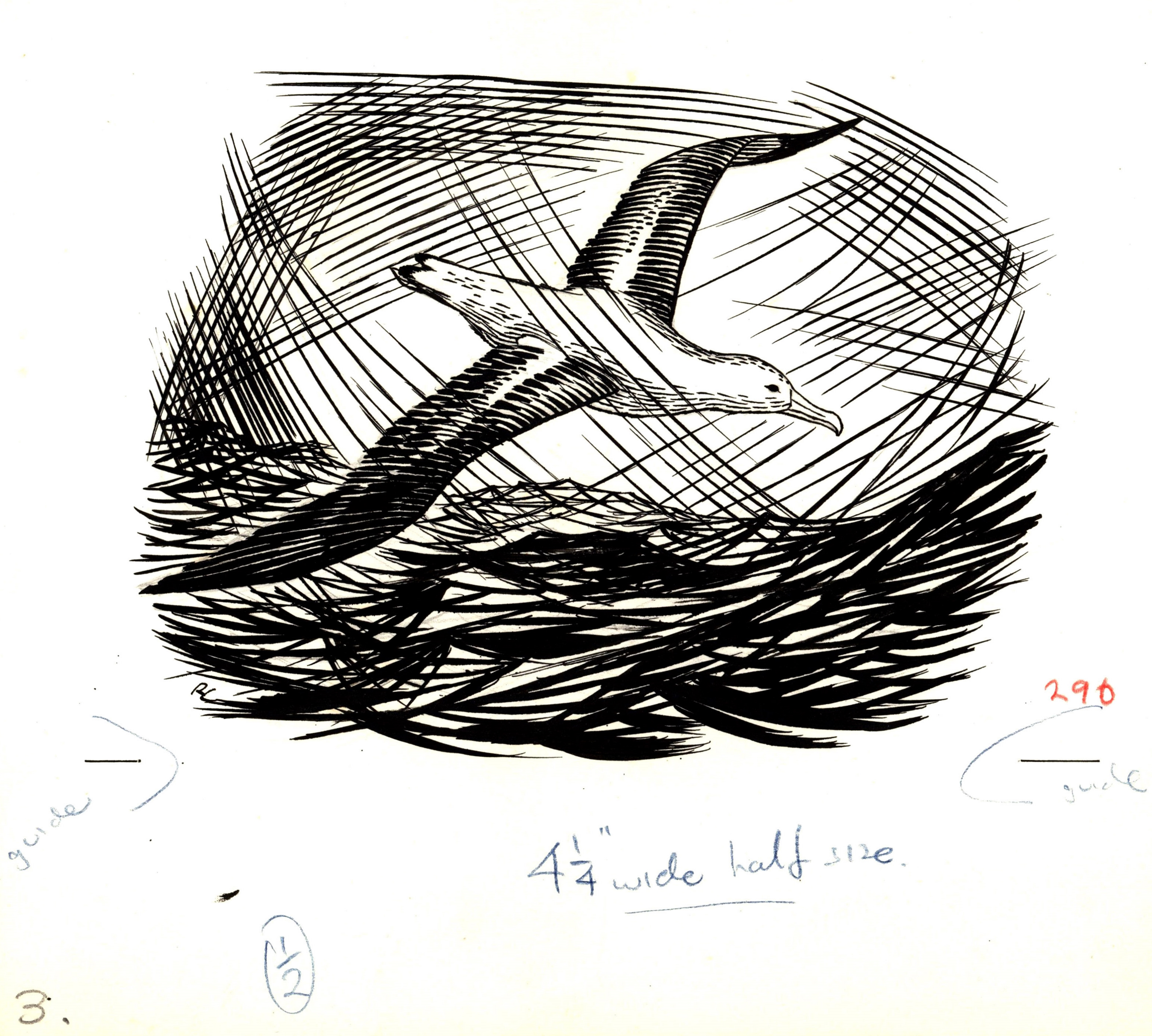
Sea bird, for Samoan school journal, by Russell Clark

Clark began designing for the newly launched magazine the New Zealand Listener from its first issue in June 1939. He went on to become involved in all aspects of the magazine's design including covers, illustrations, cartoons, and headlines. This relationship continued until 1962. Other publications that featured Clark's work for many years were Radio Weekly and the Education Department's New Zealand School Journal which featured his illustrations throughout the 1940s and 1950s. Clark was soon acting as an 'unofficial' art editor for the School Journal partnering artists and writers. In 1948 he was commissioned by the Education Department to illustrate Life at the Pa, a bulletin written by Ray Chapman Taylor about the Urewera Iwi at Ruatahuna, a region he returned to many times. Clark's paintings, sculptures and illustrations of Māori were seen to be free of the sentimentality that typified many of the images of the time. Writer and economist Bill Sutch commented that while Clark depicted the 'fun and animated talk on the marae' he also registered 'the social strain put on the Māori race by the white man's alleged civilisation.'

== World War II ==
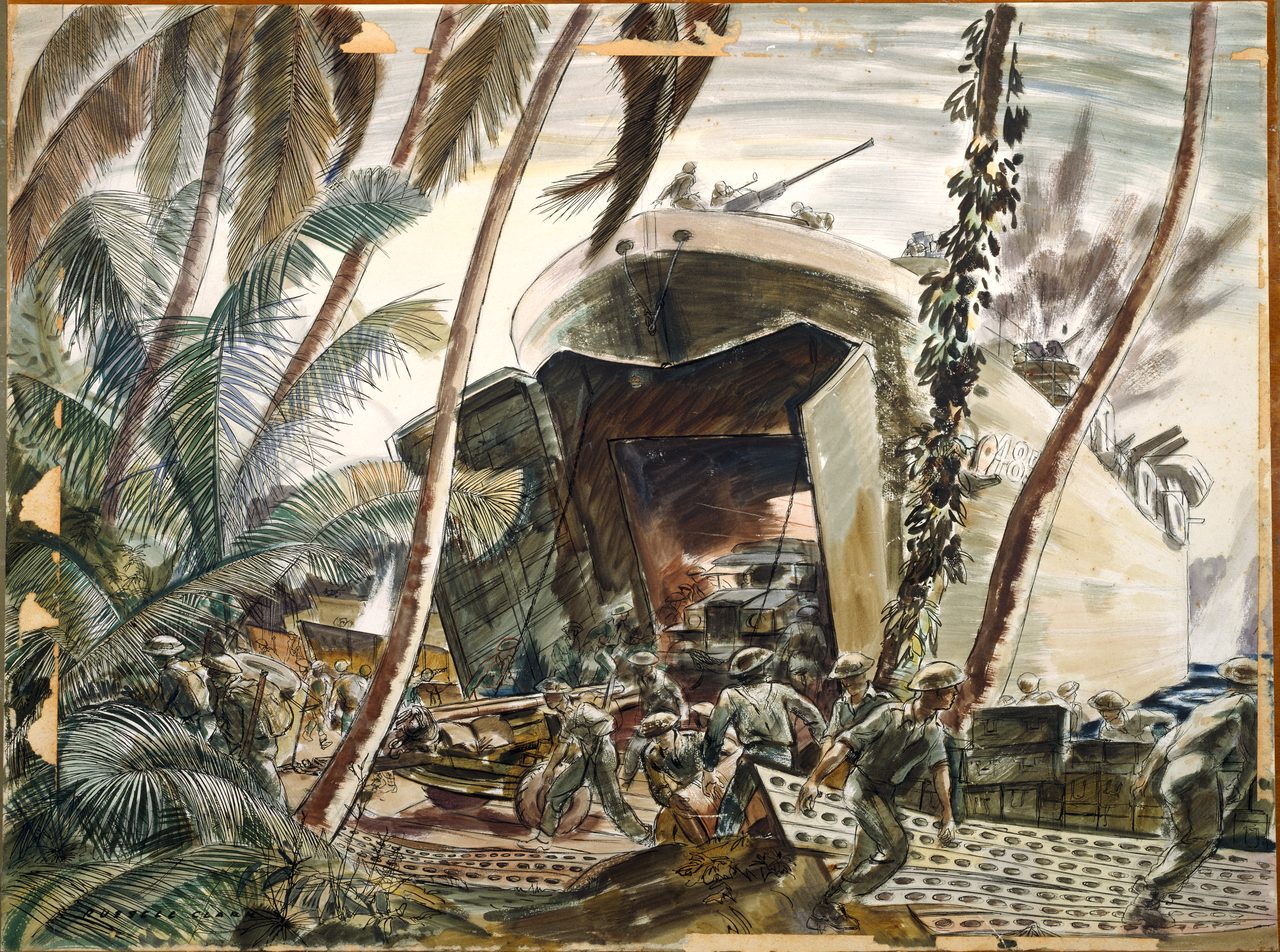
Landing Ships Under Fire, Treasury Island, 1943, by Russell Clark

After three years with the agency Catts-Patterson, Clark joined Carlton-Caruthers, but he was eager to play a part in the war. In 1942, the New Zealand Society of Arts wrote on his behalf to the Prime Minister Peter Fraser to recommend Clark as the official war artist. The position, however, was given to Peter McIntyre. Clark was called up later in the year and served as a private involved primarily in sign writing. Early in 1944, however, his position as an official war artist was approved and he was sent to the Solomon Islands with the rank of second lieutenant. While in the Solomons Clark was a member of the hanging committee for an exhibition organised by the Special Services branch of the United States Army featuring work by war artists in the Pacific. On his return to New Zealand Clark was the New Zealand representative in the exhibition Art in War shown at the Dunedin Settlers Hall.

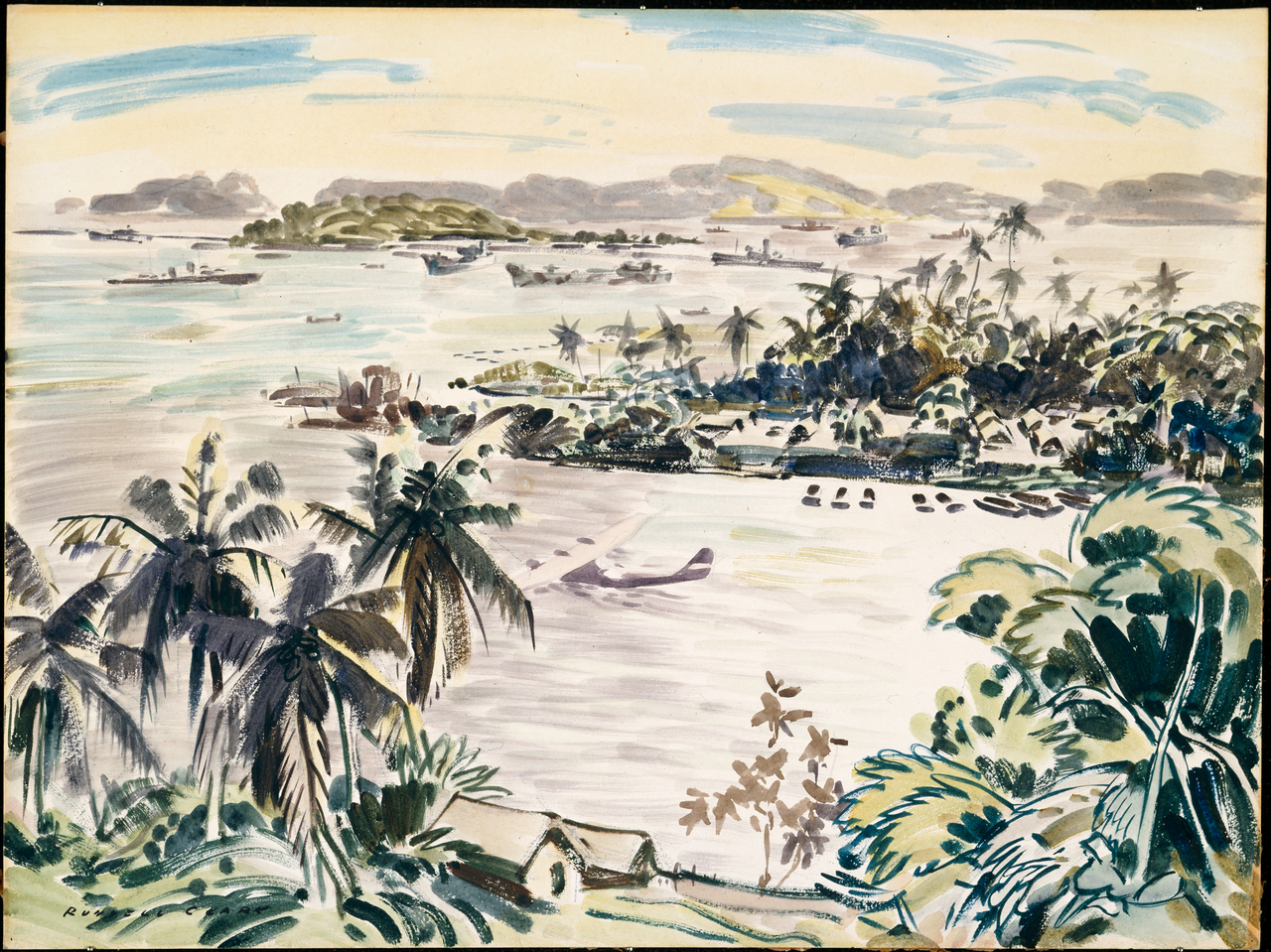
Russell Clark, Looking towards Tulagi from Halvao, 1944

== Christchurch years ==
In 1947 Clark moved to Christchurch to take up a teaching position at the Canterbury University College School of Art. In 1950 he was appointed senior lecturer in painting and continued teaching at the art school until his death in 1966. Clark became a central figure in the Christchurch art scene starting by exhibiting nine paintings and a sculpture in his first Group Show in 1948. He was also elected a member of the Council for the Canterbury Society of Arts for six years. Clark made lasting friendships with colleagues and other artists and often worked with them on joint projects. In 1951 he joined the advisory panel that went on to approve the previously rejected Frances Hodgkins painting Pleasure Garden, proposed for the Robert McDougall Art Gallery's collection. Archibald F. Nicoll, Richard Wallwork, Colin Lovell-Smith, Heathcote Helmore and Cecil Kelly were his co-panellists. In the mid-1950s Clark and fellow teacher Eric Doudney pushed for the establishment of an Arts Council to support artists. They produced a well-argued pamphlet proposing 'that some organisation should be brought into being to facilitate the employment of artists…and help in raising the general cultural level.' This advocacy played a role in the eventual establishment of the Queen Elizabeth II Arts Council.

Two years later Clark met an artist who would make a big Impression on his work: this was his brother-in-law Alan Ingham who had been born in Christchurch but studied sculpture at the Central School of Art in London. After graduating Ingham had been selected by Henry Moore to be an assistant helping with bronze casting and making moulds. When he returned to New Zealand in 1953, Ingham worked alongside Clark for a period the next year and shared his experiences with Moore's casting techniques, working practice and ideas. It was an important time for Clark who was already fascinated by Henry Moore's work and was 'galvanised' to focus on sculpture. The arrival of the Henry Moore exhibition in Christchurch two years later in 1956 increased even further what artist and art critic John Coley described as Henry Moore's 'dominant influence' on Clark's sculpture. Perhaps in recognition of this connection Clark was asked to open the touring Henry Moore exhibition when it was shown at the Durham Street Gallery in Christchurch. Although he continued as a prolific illustrator, including projects such as Denis Glover's book Hot Water Sailor in 1962, from this time on Clark was increasingly engaged in large scale sculptural commissions until his death in 1966.

== Commissioned sculptures ==
The late 1950s and early to mid-1960s saw Clark produce a significant number of large-scale sculptures. He was a passionate advocate for public art believing that 't is important that the public should become used to outdoor sculpture and to accept it as they would any other seriously conceived decorative work.'

His public sculptures include:

1957 Timaru Telephone Exchange. The sculpture was known to locals as The Ear.

1959 Mural for Christchurch airport to commemorate the Canterbury international air race by the Air Race Council.

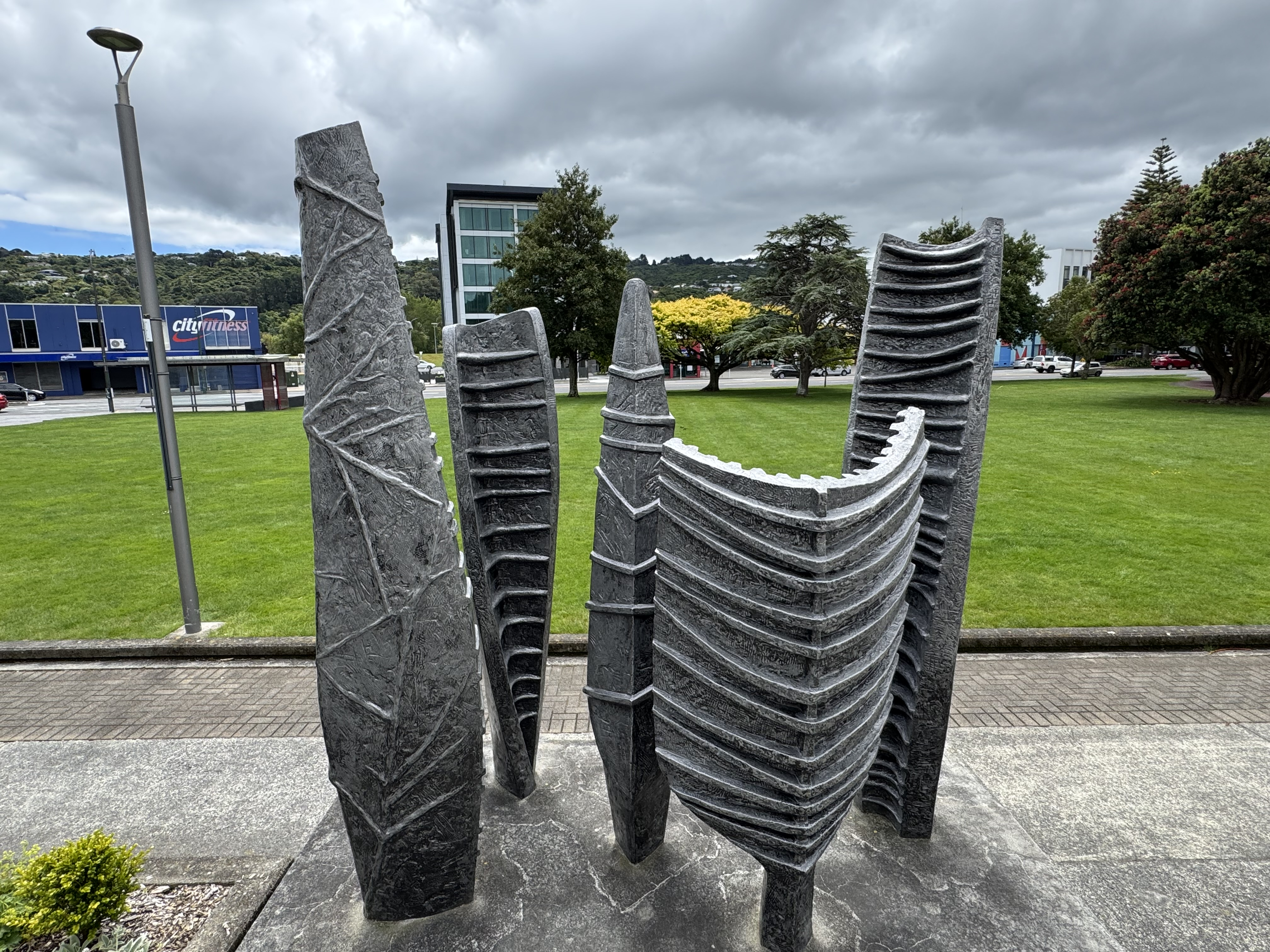
Free Standing Forms, 1967, commissioned by the Arts Advisory Council and presented by the Queen Elizabeth II Arts Council 1967

1959 Anchor stones (Matahora and Tainui) (1958–59) sited alongside the Bledisloe Building in central Auckland.

1960 Opo The Dolphin, Opononi

1960 Family Group. Initially commissioned for the Hay's Shopping Centre in Christchurch and now part of the University of Canterbury collection.

1962 Mural for the foyer of the T & G Insurance Building (demolished) in Christchurch.

1963 Fountain commissioned for Armagh Court, Christchurch.

1964 Free Standing Forms Lower Hutt Civic Centre.

== Later years and legacy ==
In 1964 Clark was featured in a one person exhibition at the Durham Street Art Gallery, Christchurch. In his review John Coley noted the impact of Clark's public sculpture throughout New Zealand. 'His work has perhaps reached a wider public in his own country than any other New Zealand painter… a remarkable exploration of the New Zealand character.' He also praised his contribution to the New Zealand Listener over so many years, and his work with the School Journal which had 'delighted generations of schoolchildren.' 1964 also saw Clark travel overseas to study architecture and the use of mosaic in public places but he became very ill. On his return Clark was offered what was to be his final commission when he won a Queen Elizabeth II Arts Council competition for sculpture for the Lower Hutt Civic Centre. He died before it could be finished and the work was completed by a sculptor at the University of Canterbury Art School.

The Russell Clark Award, for excellence in children's book illustration, was established in 1975. Since 2016, the Award has been part of the New Zealand Book Awards for Children and Young Adults. Winners include Gavin Bishop in 1989, Gwenda Turner in 1985, and Dick Frizzell in 1988.

Many of Clark's art works are held in Archives New Zealand in Wellington.

== Selected exhibitions ==
=== Solo ===
1938 Russell Clark New Zealand Artists' Group gallery in Bowen House, Wellington.

1939 Russell Clark: Murals Wellington Sketch Club.

1949 Russell Clark Dunedin Public Library.

1954 Russell Clark Wellington Architectural Centre.

1964 Russell Clark Canterbury Society of Arts.

1966 Academy of Fine Arts Annual Exhibition, Wellington. Clark was the 'Feature Artist'.

1975 Russell Clark 1905-1966 A Retrospective Exhibition Robert McDougall Art Gallery, Christchurch. Curated by Michael Dunn.

1989 Russell Clark: Illustrations Robert McDougall Art Gallery, Christchurch.

=== Group ===
1933 Group show Bristol Court Chamber, Christchurch.

1933 Otago Art Society Exhibition.

1937 Coronation Exhibition London. Organised by the Royal British Colonial Society of Artists.

1939 International and New Zealand Art National Art Gallery, Wellington.

1939 New Zealand Art: A Centennial Exhibition Wellington.

1944 New Zealand Artists in Uniform. Organised by the Army and Welfare Service toured New Zealand.

1945 Art in War Settlers Hall, Dunedin (group).

1948 Group Show (also 1958, 1959, 1960 ).

1959 Group show Gallery 91, Christchurch. The first exhibition for Gallery 91 it was opened in a special preview by Ngiao Marsh.

1959 Eight New Zealand Painters III Auckland Art Gallery.

1989 Artists on the Avon Christchurch Art Gallery.

1991 Art and Organised Labour City Gallery Wellington.

== Collections ==
Auckland Art Gallery Toi o Tāmaki

Christchurch Art Gallery Te Puna o Waiwhetu

Dunedin Public Art Gallery

MTG Hawke’s Bay Tai Ahuriri

Te Papa Tongarewa Museum of New Zealand

Waikato Museum Te Whare Taonga Waikato

== Essential reading ==
Michael Dunn Russell Clark: 1905-1966 A Retrospective Exhibition.

NOTE: Many of Clark's art works and papers are held in Archives New Zealand in Wellington.
