= Evelyn Page =

New Zealand artist

Evelyn Page OBE
- Born: Evelyn Margaret Polson; 23 April 1899; Christchurch, New Zealand
- Died: 28 May 1988 (aged 89); Wellington, New Zealand
- Occupation: Artist
- Spouse: Frederick Page (m. 1938; died 1983)
- Children: 2

Evelyn Margaret Page OBE (née Polson, 23 April 1899 – 28 May 1988) was a New Zealand artist. Her career covered seven decades, and her main areas of interest were landscapes, portraits, still lifes and nudes.

== Early life ==
Page was born in Christchurch, New Zealand, in 1899, the youngest of seven children of Mary Renshaw and John Polson. Her father was accountant and then manager of Suckling Brothers shoe company. Her parents encouraged her and her sisters to learn music and painting from an early age; in fact, Page could read both words and music, and was able to draw, before starting school.

== Education ==
In 1906, Page started primary school at Sydenham School. She initially wanted to follow in her father's footsteps and learn book-keeping, and asked to be sent to Christchurch Technical College, however she didn't enjoy the experience. Instead, when she was 15, she enrolled at Canterbury College School of Art as a junior pupil. She quickly progressed from elementary to advanced classes, under her teachers Cecil Kelly, Leonard Booth, Archibald Nicoll and Richard Wallwork. She received a number of prizes while at the school, as well as first class honours in her examinations.

While at art school, Page began lifelong friendships with a number of literary and artistic local women, including writer Ngaio Marsh and fellow artist Viola Macmillan Brown.

Page was also taught by fellow Canterbury artist Margaret Stoddart.

== Career ==
In 1922, Page was elected to the Canterbury Society of Arts, which enabled her to begin working as a professional artist, exhibiting and selling portraits and landscape works around New Zealand. In 1927, Page was a founding member of a group of Canterbury artists who became known simply as The Group. These were artists who were interested in breaking with the traditions of the art world, and wanted to start a modernist movement.

From 1930 to 1936, Page was a teacher at the Canterbury College School of Art. During this time she taught Bill Sutton, who went on to become a well-known artist. In 1933 she was a foundation member of the New Zealand Society of Artists.

=== Influences ===
A number of overseas trips influenced Page's work. In 1936 she travelled to Europe where she visited the Tate Gallery of portraits in London and was impressed by the French Post Impressionists. She started to use pure colour after this trip.

Some years later, Page began to admire the work of Kokoschka and in 1956-1957 she travelled to Salzburg, Austria, to attend a Kokoschka summer school.

=== Recognition ===
In 1983, Page was made a Fellow of the New Zealand Academy of Fine Arts, and was also the first artist to hold the Governor-General's Art Award.

In the 1987 New Year Honours, Page was appointed an Officer of the Order of the British Empire, for services to art.

== Personal life ==
Page married pianist Frederick Page in 1938 in Governors Bay, near Christchurch, and they rented a country house there for the next seven years before moving to Wellington. They had two children, a son (Sebastian, born 1939) and a daughter (Anna, born 1942). Her husband died suddenly in 1983, and Page died in 1988 in Wellington.
