= Archibald Nicoll =

New Zealand artist and art teacher

Archibald Nicoll OBE
- Born: Archibald Frank Nicoll; 14 June 1886; Lincoln, New Zealand
- Died: 1 February 1953 (aged 66); Christchurch, New Zealand
- Education: Canterbury College School of Fine Art
- Known for: painting, portrait
- Spouse: Ellen Ethel Fearn
- Awards: Bledisloe Medal

Archibald Frank Nicoll OBE (14 June 1886 – 1 February 1953) was a New Zealand artist and art teacher. His interpretation of the Canterbury landscape made him a leader in what has become known as the 'Canterbury School'.

== Early life and education ==
He was born in Lincoln, Canterbury. He was the fifth of six children of Alexander Nicoll, a farmer, and his wife, Eliza Pannett. He attended Springston School from 1891 to 1899. He was awarded a scholarship to attend Christchurch Boys' High School and attended the school from 1900 to 1902.

== Career ==
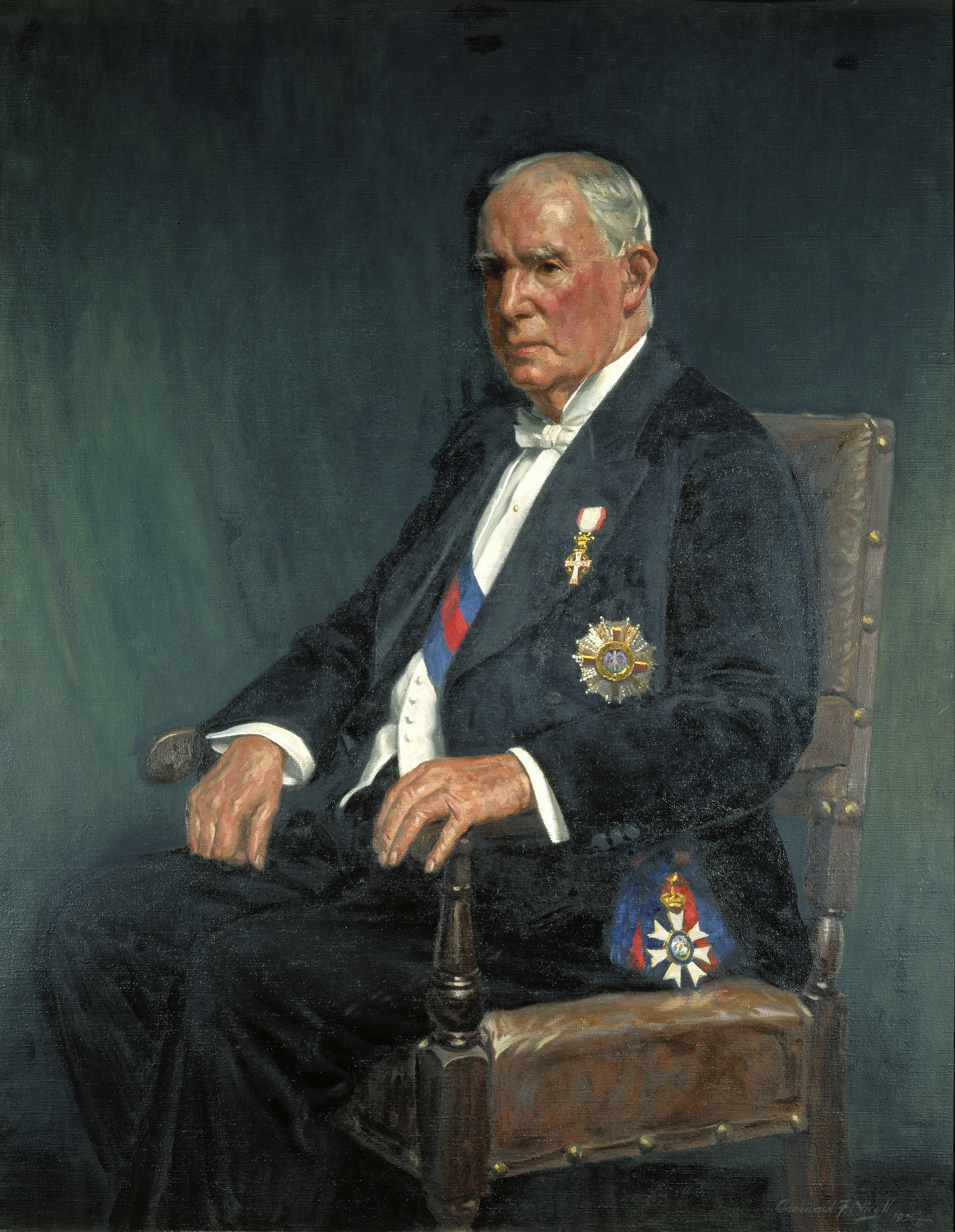
Francis Bell painted by Nicoll in 1935

After school he started working at the Union Steamship Company as a junior clerk. During this time he continued to draw and he enrolled in an evening class at the Canterbury College School of Art. In 1904 he became a member of the Canterbury Society of Arts and exhibited with them and the New Zealand Academy of Fine Arts in 1905. In 1907 he resigned from the Union Steamship Company and was appointed to a teaching position at Elam School of Art and Design in Auckland. In 1911 he moved to Edinburgh. He started studying at the Edinburgh College of Art as a mature student in 1912. One year later he was offered a teaching position at the Edinburgh College of Art. While based in Edinburgh he won a number of prizes which allowed him to travel to Europe. In 1914 he moved back to New Zealand arriving in September. He exhibited at the Canterbury Society of Arts in September of that year and in October he also presented a one-man show with over 200 of his works. With the First World War escalating a call for New Zealand men to enlist was sent out. On 9 December 1914 he enlisted with the New Zealand Expeditionary Force. He fought in the Second Battle of the Somme and was injured during the fighting. His injury resulted in the amputation of his right leg above the knee. He returned to Wellington in 1918 and took up a relief teaching position at the Wellington Technical College. In 1919 he was appointed the Director of the Canterbury College School of Art. He regularly exhibited with art societies beyond Christchurch and 1930 he exhibited for a second time at the Royal Academy, London. He resigned as director of Canterbury College School of Art to paint full-time in 1928. Without the responsibilities of teaching he painted a lot of portraits during this time. With the birth of his son in 1933 he decided to return to teaching and rejoined the staff of the Canterbury College School of Art in 1934. He remained there until his retirement in 1945. In the 1947 King's Birthday Honours, Nicoll was appointed an Officer of the Order of the British Empire for services to art.
