= Centre of Contemporary Art =

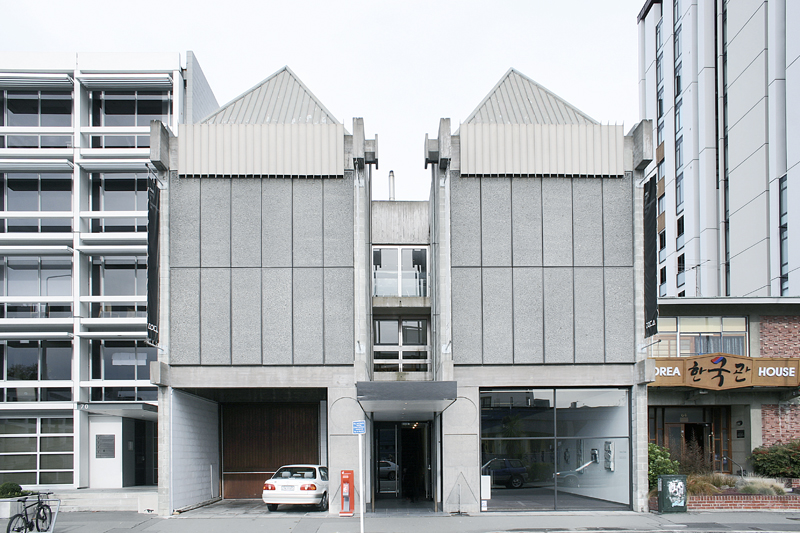
- The CoCA gallery
- Interactive map of the Centre of Contemporary Art area

General information
- Architectural style: modernist
- Location: Christchurch Central City, 66 Gloucester Street, Christchurch
- Coordinates: 43°31′48″S 172°37′55″E
- Construction started: 1968
- Renovated: 2011–2016
- Renovation cost: NZ$4.1 m
- Owner: CSA Charitable Trust

Design and construction
- Architecture firm: Minson, Henning Hansen

Centre of Contemporary Art (CoCA, formerly the Canterbury Society of Arts) is a curated art gallery in the centre of Christchurch, New Zealand. The gallery is governed by the Canterbury Society of Arts Charitable Trust.

== History ==
=== The Canterbury Society of Arts ===
CoCA began in 1880 as the Canterbury Society of Arts (CSA). It was the first organisation to exhibit and collect artworks in Christchurch, and quickly became the most influential and dynamic arts society in New Zealand. Its first exhibition was held in 1881 at Christchurch Boys' High School, in what later became part of the Christchurch Arts Centre. The CSA played an essential role in New Zealand's burgeoning arts scene. In the 1930s it exhibited the works of “The Group”; a collection of artists including the eminent New Zealand painters Rita Angus, Evelyn Page and Doris Lusk. The CSA found its first permanent home in 1890 in a building especially designed for it by society member and acclaimed New Zealand architect Benjamin Mountfort (1825–1898) – the Canterbury Society of Arts Gallery. This was a prime example of the function and form of Gothic Revival in New Zealand architecture. A second neighbouring gallery, in the more conservatively favoured Venetian Gothic style, was added in 1894 by Richard Dacre Harman. Both buildings were on the New Zealand Historic Places Trust register until their demolition following the 2011 Christchurch earthquake.

=== Gloucester Street and CoCA ===
In 1968 the CSA moved to larger premises at 66 Gloucester Street. The purpose-built gallery is a major example of the 'Christchurch Style' of modernist buildings designed by Canterbury's avant-garde architects in the post-war period. The building was honoured by two New Zealand Institute of Architects awards. In the years following this move, the gallery thrived and was renowned for housing some of the most progressive and innovative exhibitions in New Zealand's history of art. The CSA helped launch the careers of local New Zealand artists including Neil Dawson, Bruce Edgar, Ross Marwick, and Boyd Webb, who had their inaugural exhibitions there in June 1971.

In 1996, the CSA gallery was rebranded CoCA Centre of Contemporary Art. In 2016, the gallery was gifted the name Toi Moroki by Ngāi Tahu. The gallery's full name became CoCA Toi Moroki Centre of Contemporary Art.

=== Earthquake and recovery ===
Like many prominent buildings in Christchurch, the CoCA gallery was damaged in the February earthquakes of 2011. In 2013 a "rescue squad of volunteers, former gallery staff on contract and experts from Te Papa recovered all the artworks trapped in the building, including everything on display at the time and the gallery's collection". Four million dollars was spent on repairs, strengthening and refurbishment of the building.

== Future and refocus ==
CoCA reopened on 13 February 2016 in its restored and modernised gallery space on Gloucester Street. The gallery was closed again temporarily after the 2016 Christchurch earthquake struck the day after the reopening. Since 2022, CoCA has refocussed its role within New Zealand contemporary art, and places an emphasis on serving its local arts community. Programmed by an artist-led group via an open call process, CoCA continues to show work by prominent New Zealand artists including the late Robyn Kahukiwa, Judy Darragh and Ron Te Kawa, as well as emerging artists including arts collective The Killing.
