= Elva Bett =

New Zealand art gallery owner (1918 - 1991)

Elva Bett QSM
- Born: Elva Lilian Brown; 30 March 1918; Dunedin, New Zealand
- Died: 6 December 2016 (aged 98); Paraparaumu, New Zealand
- Spouse: John James Bett

Elva Lilian Bett QSM (née Brown, 30 March 1918 – 6 December 2016) was a New Zealand artist, art historian and art gallery director. Her work is held in the Museum of New Zealand Te Papa Tongarewa.

== Biography ==
Bett was born Elva Lilian Brown in Dunedin, New Zealand, on 30 March 1918, the daughter of Lily May Marion Brown and Herbert Patrick Flowerdew Brown. In 1940, she became engaged to John James Bett, and the couple later married.

An artist in her own right, Bett focused on painting and printmaking and considered herself a purist: "When all is said and done, I think there is a content in painting which goes beyond just the pictorial or the gimmicky or the adventuresome or the experimental". Bett was an artist member New Zealand Academy of Fine Arts and an honourable member New Zealand Print Council. In the 1960s, Bett was based in Wellington where she was a director at the Centre Gallery.

Elva Bett curated an exhibition as director of the Centre Gallery in 1968 called Painting today by Thirty Women Painters.

In 1968, Bett and her business partner, Catherine Duncan, opened the Bett-Duncan Gallery on Cuba Street, where they exhibited works of promising and established artists, and Bett held art classes. Early exhibitions included pottery by Doreen Blumhardt and prints by Greer Twiss and Hamish Keith. In 1976, Duncan left the gallery which subsequently became the Elva Bett Gallery. The gallery exhibited art by emerging artists such as Tony Fomison, Philip Clairmont, and Allen Maddox.

In the 1980s, Betts focus shifted from gallery work to writing and she went on to publish two books including Drawing and Painting: a complete study course for New Zealanders (1984).

In the 1988 New Year Honours, Bett was awarded the Queen's Service Medal for community service. She died in Paraparaumu on 6 December 2016.

Bett was referred to in a book of prose poems about visual art by Michele Leggott called Vanishing Points. This book of poetry combines historical references such as Bett and paintings by Leggott’s mother with references to fictional works of art by Leggott’s mother and fictional exhibitions such as reference to the exhibition A Room of One’s Own: Women in New Zealand Art, 1964 purportedly curated by Bett.

== Publications ==
- Drawing and Painting: A Complete Study Course for New Zealanders. Wellington: Reed, 1984.
- New Zealand Art: A Modern Perspective. Auckland: Reed Methuen, 1986.
