= Neil Grant (potter) =

New Zealand potter (1938–2024)

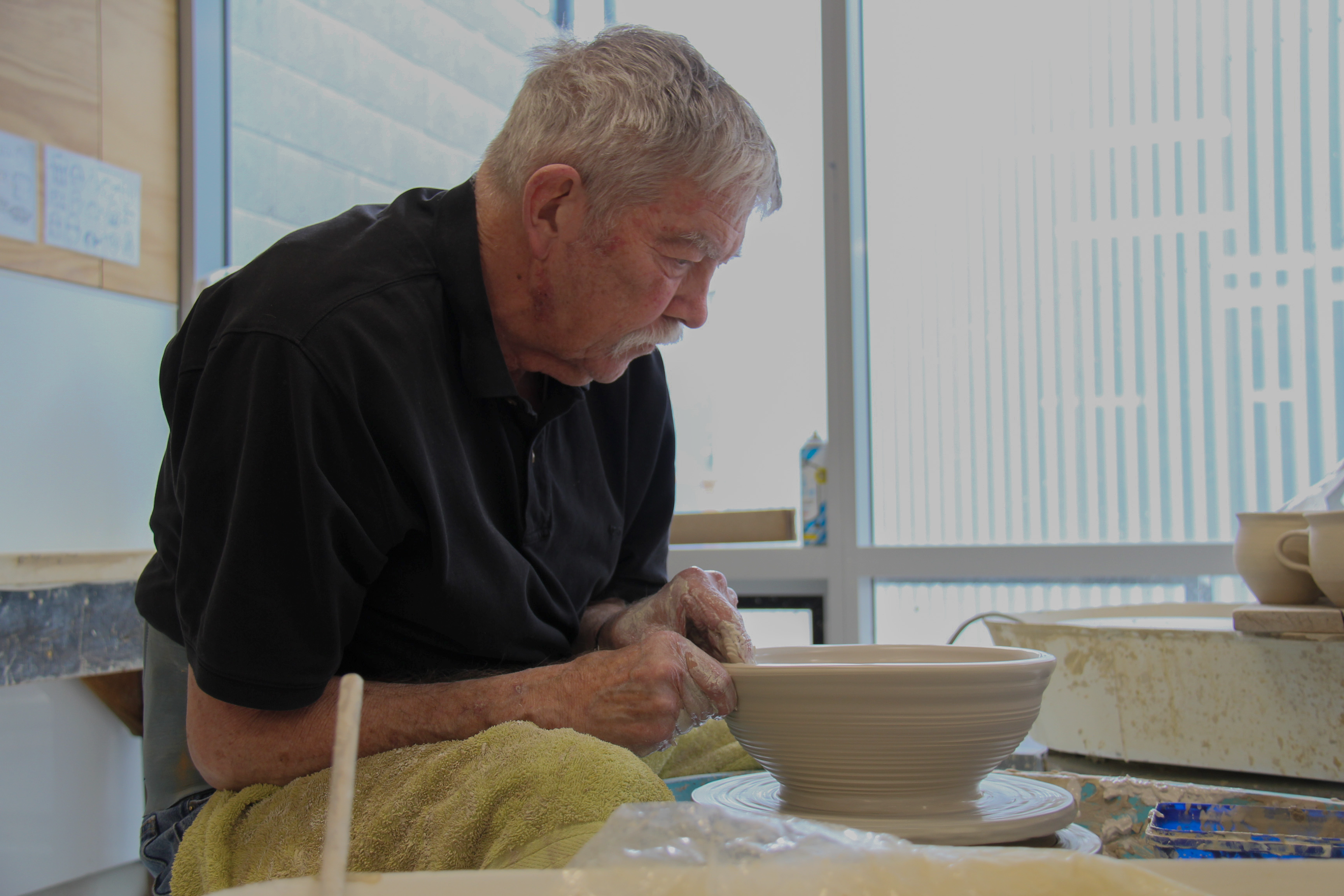
- Born: 7 November 1938; Napier, New Zealand
- Died: 7 May 2024 (aged 85)
- Occupations: Artist, potter

Neil Macalister Grant (7 November 1938 – 7 May 2024) was a New Zealand potter and ceramics teacher.

== Early life and family ==
Neil Macalister Grant was born in Napier on 7 November 1938. His parents were schoolteachers, shifting from one placement to another every few years: to Marton, then back to Tarradale near Napier, where Grant attended Napier Boys' High School as a boarder, then to Auckland, where he went to Mount Roskill Grammar School from the age of fourteen to sixteen, and finally to Eltham in Taranaki, where he was a student at Stratford Technical High School. He went on to study at Ilam, the Canterbury University School of Fine Arts, graduating in 1960 with a Diploma in Fine Arts in Sculpture. He then trained as a secondary school teacher at Auckland Secondary Teachers’ Training College.

In 1960 Grant married Nicola Nell Baird (Niki), from Hokitika. The couple had three children.

Grant died in Dunedin on 7 May 2024.

== Art educator ==
After some years as an art teacher at Mount Albert Grammar School, in 1976 he took a lecturing position at the Dunedin School of Art at the Otago Polytechnic where he joined Michael Trumic on the staff of the ceramics department, soon taking over as tutor-in-charge.

Grant was later instrumental in introducing a remodelled Distance Ceramics course offered for the first time in 2002. Nationally recognised ceramicists tutored studio classes at regional centres in Auckland, Hamilton, Otaki, Wellington, Nelson and Christchurch, contracted and paid-for by the Otago Polytechnic. Drawing, Art History and Theory and Glaze Technology were delivered by part-time campus staff on-line from 2003. This initiative had been developed by Neil Grant, who retired as Head of Ceramics in 2003, but continued as a part-time lecturer on a permanent basis as the Distance Learning Programme Coordinator.

== Pottery ==
His sixty-year career as a ceramic artist spans the years from the flowering of domestic rustic pots to large sculptural ceramics and architectural commissions. He is well known for his distinctive reworking of traditional Shino-Japanese pottery into a fusion of Anglo-Oriental forms but recreating them in new and exciting ways.

Grant’s first experience of clay was preparing modelling material for tutors at Ilam. Early influences in ceramics were products from the Luke Adams Pottery in Christchurch, and purchases he made of imported Leach Pottery in 1960. At the Auckland Secondary Teachers’ College Grant was introduced to the practice of pottery by Peter Smith, Principal Lecturer in the Visual Arts Department. He attended pottery throwing demonstrations at Auckland University Extension classes run by Barry Brickell. A major influence was the work and practice of Len Castle and the Auckland Studio Potters Group established in 1961. Grant became a founding member of the New Zealand Society of Potters in 1962. From 1965 to 1979 he was a regular exhibitor at New Vision Gallery run by run by Kees and Tine Hos. He featured in the 2nd Potter’s Calendar, published by New Vision, for 1968, photographed by Marti Friedlander.

In 1965 Japanese ceramics was celebrated in New Zealand at the Pan Pacific Arts Festival with workshops by the Japanese master potter Shoji Hamada. Grant attended Hamada’s workshops, preparing clay and acting as Hamada’s ‘electric boy’, kicking a converted Leach pottery wheel.

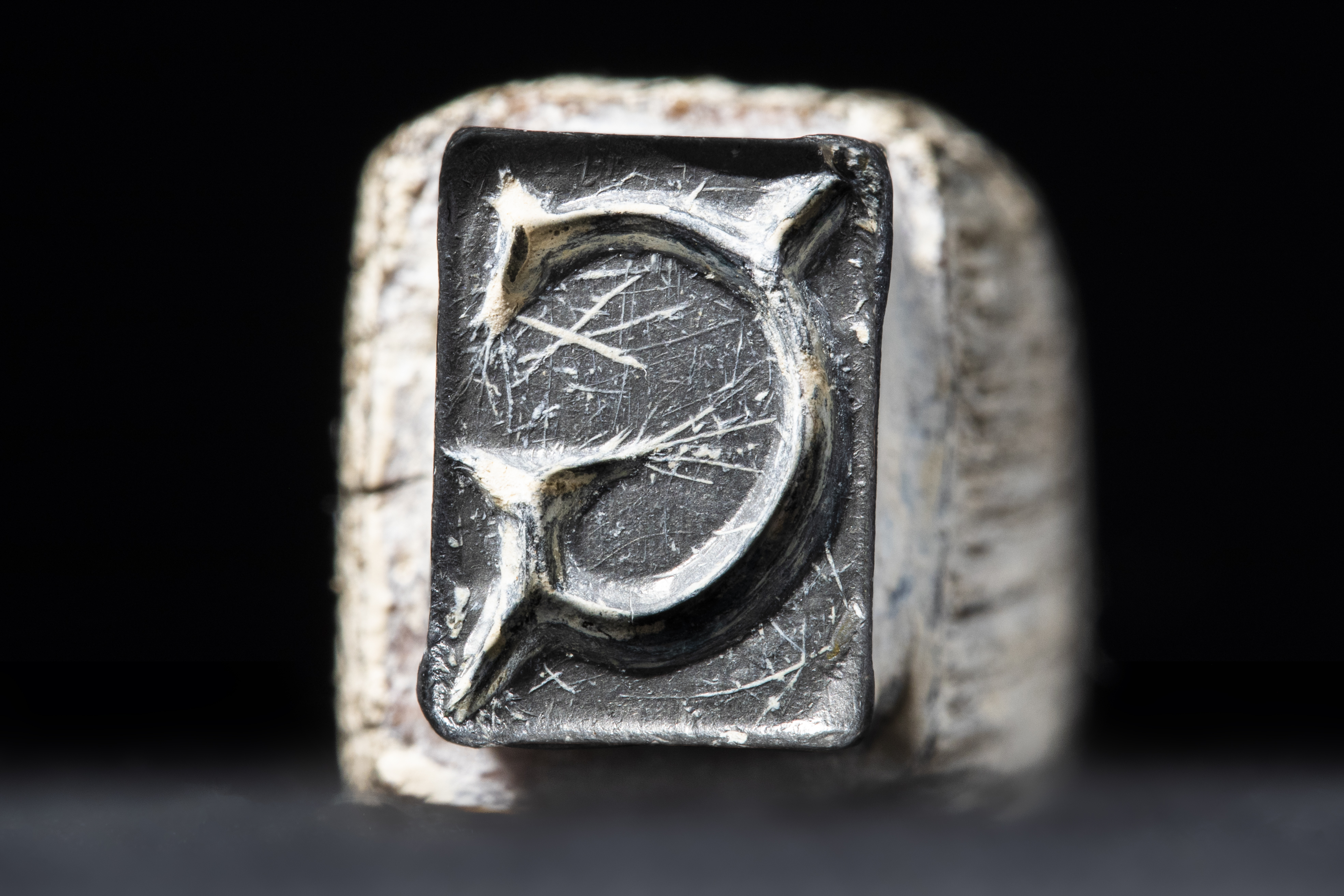
Neil Grant, Potters stamp 2020, Photograph Thomas Lord.

Aside from assisting during Hamada’s visit, Neil Grant also attended high profile workshops by visiting international potters and ceramic artists including Paul Soldner, Daniel Rhodes, John Pollex, Don Reitz and John Glick. In 1979 Grant travelled to the USA on a QEII Study Award to visit ceramic departments at American tertiary institutions, meeting notable potters including Richard Shaw, John Mason, Peter Voulkos, Wayne Higby and William Daley. During a second visit to the US in 2001 he ran classes at several Summer Schools.

Grant is best known for his domestic stoneware, his sculptural Nikau Series and Wavy Line "piece pots" from the 1970s. He has also produced magnificent lustre bottles and lidded floor pots. In his later years he worked intensely on producing domestic ware, large platters and dishes using chün over tenmoku glazes, as well as superbly crafted celadon work with celadon jade and sang-de-boeuf glazes. Many of his pieces also display his skill at Japanese-style brushwork, "chattering" and "fluting".

== Honours and awards ==
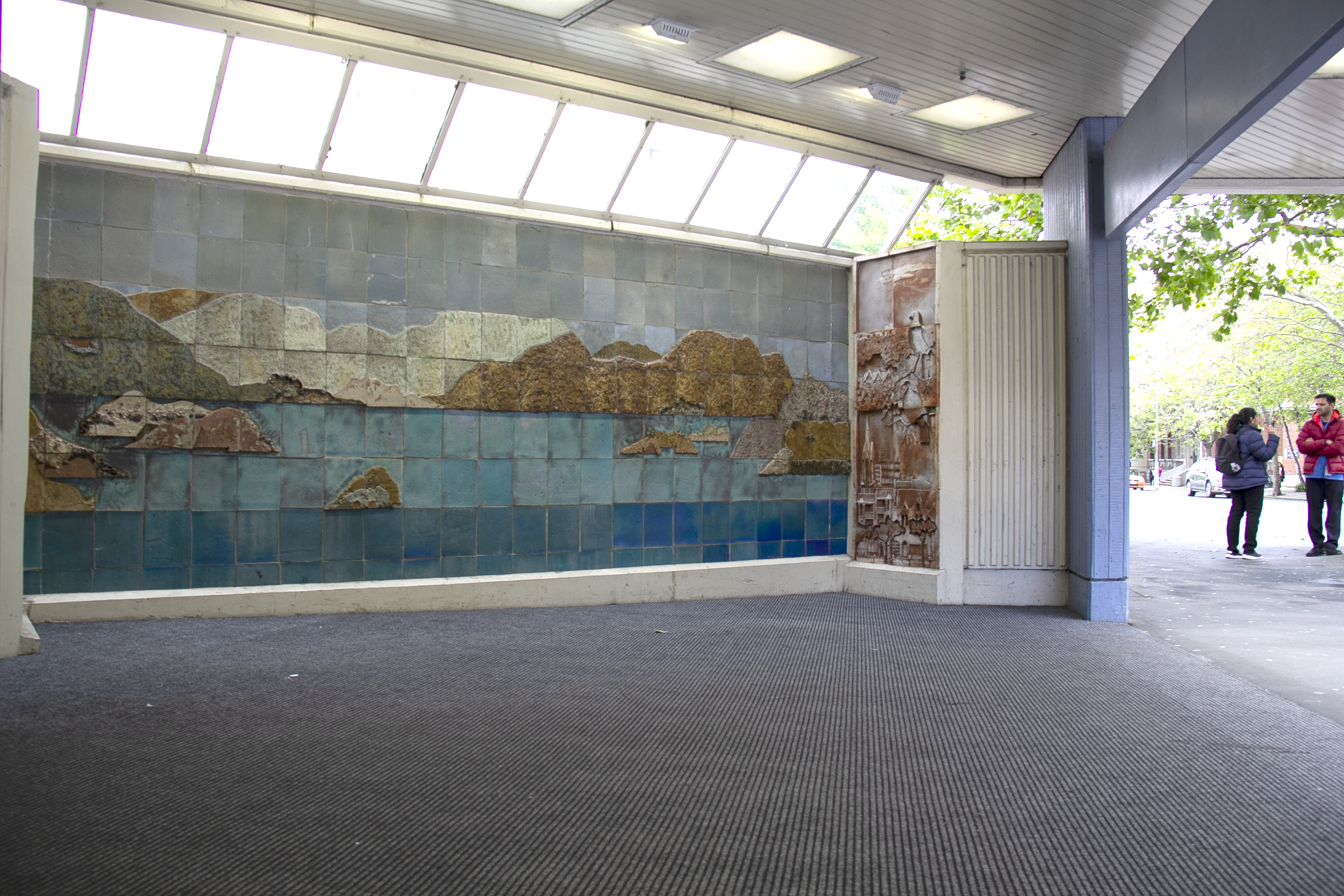
Neil Grant, Dunedin Hospital Mural, Ceramic tiles, 1984. Photograph Pam McKinlay.

In the early 1970s Grant was recognised as a master potter on the international stage: he showed work at the World Expo Exhibition, Osaka 1970 and at the QEII Commonwealth Games Exhibition which travelled to Fiji. His work was selected for the New Zealand section of an international ceramics exhibition in Faenza. that was then bought for the International Museum of Ceramics at the Musée Ariana in Geneva. He showed work at the World Craft Council exhibition in Toronto. In 1971, he featured in an article by John Baggaley The Artful Potters of New Zealand, in Air New Zealand's Jetway Magazine. His work was photographed by Brian Brake for Craft New Zealand: The Art of the Craftsman (1981). edited by Doreen Blumhardt and Brake, and works included later in Athol McCredie’s Brian Brake: Lens on the World (2010).

Grant received a mural commission in 1984 to enhance the main entrance to the Dunedin Hospital in Dunedin.

During the 1980s and through to the 2000s Grant was active in all major pottery conventions and exhibitions in New Zealand.
