= Ruth Castle =

New Zealand weaver (1931- )

- Born: Ruth Main; 9 April 1931 (age 95); Matamata, New Zealand
- Known for: Basketweaving
- Spouse: Len Castle (m. 1959; div. 1987)

Ruth Castle (née Main, born 9 April 1931) is a New Zealand weaver. Her work has been exhibited widely and is held in a range of public New Zealand institutions.

== Early life and family ==
Castle was born Ruth Main on 9 April 1931 in Matamata, the daughter of Elsie Kathleen Main (née Hall) and William Harold Main. She was educated at Waikato Diocesan School in Hamilton, and Epsom Girls' Grammar School in Auckland, before studying languages at Auckland University College between 1949 and 1951. She went on to train as an occupational therapist at the School of Occupational Therapy at Oakley Hospital, graduating with a Diploma of Occupational Therapy in 1955.

She married potter Len Castle in 1959, and the couple divorced in 1987.

== Career and practice ==
In 1956, she became a handcrafts tutor for adults, during which time she developed her weaving skills.

In 1967, she travelled across several countries in Asia to investigate and observe weaving practices.

From the late 1970s, argues art historian Damian Skinner, Castle had become "an established part of the studio craft scene in Aotearoa" New Zealand. She served on the Titirangi Community Arts Council for a large part of the 1980s, and from 1985 to 1990 was exhibitions officer at Lopdell House.

She was awarded a QEII Arts Council grant to travel to California and Mexico in 1981, studying the weaving techniques and materials of Native American weavers in California and Arizona, and weaving practices in Mexico. She also visited a range of museums where she was able to study their basket collections and be exposed to contemporary weaving practices.

Her work was selected for inclusion in Kahurangi: Treasures from New Zealand, a major exhibition of New Zealand contemporary craft shown in the United States in 1984. In 1989 she was made a life member of the Arts Council. In 1993, she exhibited at the Cave Rock Gallery at the Christchurch Arts Centre. She has exhibited with the New Zealand Academy of Fine Arts. In 2015 Objectspace staged a significant exhibition of Castle's work, curated by Dr Damian Skinner, designed to reflect her lifetime of weaving and give viewers an understanding of her process.

Castle uses a wide range of materials and techniques in her practice, and has two or three basic approaches to her work. Using fine rattancore, she weaves intricate patterned dishes and other items. She also weaves sculptural open-cane work and experiments with natural fibres 'such as vines, grass, rope and branches.'

== Collections ==
Her work is held in the Auckland War Memorial Museum, Te Uru Waitakere Contemporary Gallery in Auckland, the Academy of Fine Arts in Wellington, The Dowse Art Museum in Lower Hutt, Christchurch Art Gallery, and the Museum of Folk Art in Tokyo.

== Selected exhibitions ==
- 1969, Len Castle and Ruth Castle, New Vision Gallery, Auckland
- 1969, Len Castle Pottery, Ruth Castle Basketry, Several Arts Gallery, Christchurch
- 1970, New Zealand Asian Exhibition, World Craft Council, Dublin, Ireland
- 1972, New Zealand Crafts 1972, International Tour
- 1974, Powerhouse Museum, Sydney
- 1979, CSA Gallery, Christchurch
- 1982, Suter Gallery, Nelson, (with basketmaker Willa Rogers)
- 1984, Baskets Galore, The Pumphouse, Takapuna, Auckland
- 1984, Kahurangi: Treasures from New Zealand, Pacific Asia Museum, Los Angeles
- 1988, World Expo, Brisbane
- 1989, Contemporary Basketry, Compendium Gallery, Devonport, Auckland
- 1993, Cave Rock Gallery, Christchurch
- 1995, NZ Craft in the 90s, New Zealand Academy of Fine Arts, Wellington
- 1996, Panoply, The Dowse Art Museum, Lower Hutt
- 2015, Ruth Castle: Basketmaker, Objectspace, Auckland

== Further sources ==
- Jenny Pattrick, Ruth Castle, New Zealand Crafts 9, March–April 1984
- Damian Skinner, Ruth Castle, Basket Maker, Garland, 2015
