= Several Arts =

Former art gallery in New Zealand

Coordinates: 43°31′34″S 172°38′11″E

- Known for: Craft and contemporary art
- Founded: 1960
- Location: Christchurch

Several Arts was a commercial gallery specialising in craft and contemporary art in Christchurch, New Zealand, from 1960 to 1991.

== Beginnings ==
Several Arts was opened by Miro (Michael) Trumic in 1960 in Christchurch at 793 Colombo Street. Trumic had moved to New Zealand from his birthplace in Yugoslavia in 1950. Through a friendship with fellow refugee Rudi Gopas, Trumic developed the interest in craft and contemporary art that became the focus of Several Arts. Several Arts was the only commercial gallery showing contemporary art in Christchurch until 1965, when it was joined by another craft-based gallery, the Little Woodware Shop. No other gallery dedicated to contemporary art in Christchurch existed until the 1975 opening of the Brooke Gifford Gallery. Prior to Several Arts there had only been one stand-alone commercial art gallery for the visual arts in Christchurch, Gallery 91. That had operated for just one year in 1959.

Although primarily craft-oriented, Trumic kept a close eye on the local scene. In 1961, for example, when the Canterbury Museum featured reproductions of Stone Age paintings found in the Lascaux caves, Trumic mounted an exhibition of Māori rock art in the form of tracings made by artist Tony Fomison. Fomison had an exhibition of his own work the following year at Several Arts. At the time Fomison was in his early twenties and still at art school where he was taught by Gopas. Ceramics were central to Several Arts, with important artists like Len Castle, Harry and May Davis, David Brokenshire, Mirek Smíšek, and Barry Brickell exhibiting. New Zealand Potter Magazine commented on Several Arts in 1966, saying that, 'run by potter Michael Trumic and his wife Victoria; this shop has helped greatly in building up goodwill towards and interest in the crafts. The exhibitions they put on periodically of one or two man shows have helped in the establishment of several potters.' In the mid-1960s Several Arts moved to 809 Colombo Street.

== The Hewson years ==
In the late 1960s Trumic left Several Arts to work as a full-time potter and teacher, and the business was taken over by Ngaire Hewson and her husband George. They ran Several Arts from August 1967 until 1977. Hewson, an artist herself, intended to retain the craft/art mix and added a gallery consisting of two adjoining rooms upstairs from the shop that were 'suitable for small exhibitions of paintings, drawings, sculpture and pottery'. The layout was later described as, 'two rooms opening into each other, the larger fifteen by fifteen feet (21 square meters). Into the space of these two rooms we can put about a hundred and fifty pots ... the building is old so the ceiling is high... around both rooms are wooden benches about two feet wide. ...above these benches we can tier two shelves.' Hewson's exhibition programme followed Trumic's pattern. She opened with etchings by Barry Cleavin (The Print Maker Press 10 August 1967, Page 8) followed by ceramics exhibitions by Trumic and Barry Brickell. Artists who exhibited in the first two years included Lee Cresswell, Philip Trusttum, Rudi Gopas, Trevor Moffitt, and Tom Taylor. In the second half of 1968 Nelson artists and potters Frank and May Davis exhibited paintings and printed fabrics. Fabrics were also central to the work of Fanny Buss, whose printed fabrics and clothing became a regular feature of the exhibition gallery and shop. A contemporary advertisement for Several Arts describes Buss's output as including, 'caftans • mini skirt and waistcoat sets, trouser suits, tunic frocks in velvet, cotton and corduroy.' Hewson was also a fan of Rudi Gopas. He had taught her in the early sixties and she went on to become his sole agent, exhibiting his work regularly. Under Hewson's ownership craft remained at the forefront but along with 'stoneware, hand block printed frocks, scarves, hand spun sweaters, ski socks, mittens, hand spun wool for knitting, spinning wheels and looms, fleece wool for spinning and yarns for weaving' were a number of significant contemporary art exhibitions.

In 1970, while he was finishing his honours year at the Ilam School of Fine Arts at the University of Canterbury, Several Arts exhibited Philip Clairmont's first solo show. The exhibition featured 70 works comprising 19 paintings, 38 drawings, 10 prints, and three sculptures.' It was a bold step for the small gallery. In his review, artist and critic Trevor Moffitt commented of Clairmont's work that it, 'bristles with the menace of a threatening world of drugs, war and violence. Bird, human and abstract forms tangle in nightmarish despair.' Established artists including Suzanne Goldberg, John Coley, Barry Cleavin, Rudi Gopas, Quentin Macfarlane, Alison Pickmere, and Toss Woollaston were shown, along with recent graduates from the art school including Jonathan Mane-Wheoki (then known simply as Jonathan Mane), and Tony Geddes.

== A final turn to craft ==
By the mid-1970s Several Arts was being run by Anne Noonan and Mel Pritchard who focused the exhibitions and showroom almost entirely on crafts. In 1977, they purchased the shop next door as a showroom for looms and spinning wheels, and as a place for the craft community to hold classes. The art gallery of Several Arts was not used for around 10 years until it was reopened in 1985 with the exhibition Tense Interiors, featuring etchings by Diane Morris. The 15 prints on show were recent works from her final year of study at Ilam. The following year the gallery celebrated by hanging a flag designed by Friedensreich Hundertwasser, featuring a green spiral on a white background speaking for 'nature, Māori history and future generations.

== Closing ==
Several Arts closed in 1991, with its final owner, Naomi Gilling, citing the 'current economic recession'. The last exhibition was aptly named 'The Last Exhibition'.
