= Barry Brickell =

New Zealand potter (1935–2016)

Ian Barry Brickell OBE (26 October 1935 – 23 January 2016) was a New Zealand potter, writer, conservationist and founder of Driving Creek Railway.

== Biography ==
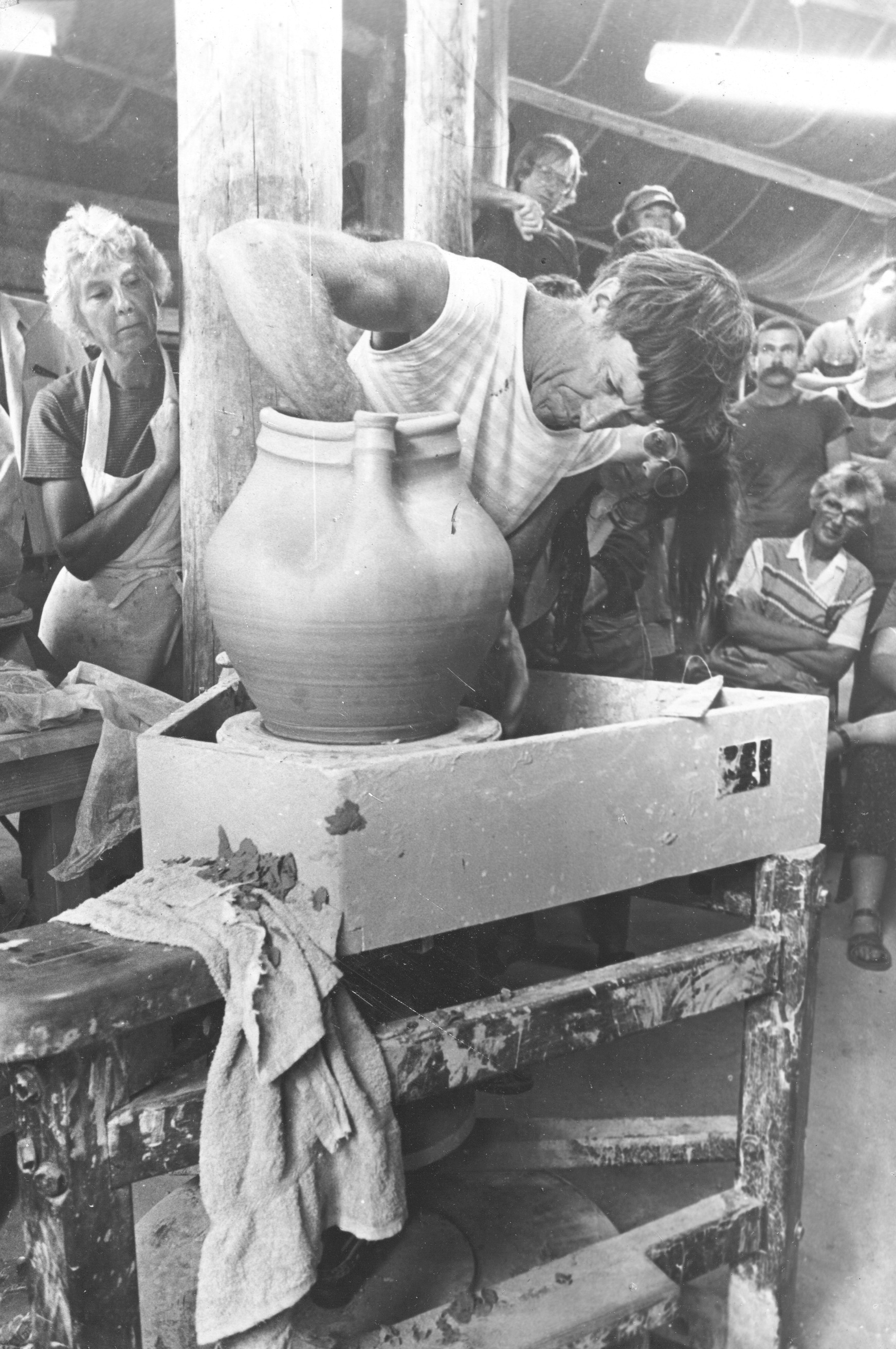
Brickell in his studio, circa 1970

Born in New Plymouth in 1935, Brickell was the son of Shirley Margaret Wooler and Maurice Crawford Brickell. The family soon moved to Auckland, initially staying in Meadowbank then settling in Devonport on Auckland's North Shore. While a student at Takapuna Grammar School, Brickell was introduced to potter Len Castle. He enrolled in a Bachelor of Science Degree at Auckland University College in 1954, completing his studies under the Post Primary Teacher's Bursary Scheme. His first and only teaching appointment was in 1961, at Coromandel District High School. This lasted only a few months. Brickell then became a full-time potter and purchased his first property near the township of Coromandel. Because this location had good access by sea to Auckland, he was able to deliver pots to the city, or at times, sell them directly from the wharf.

In 1974, he bought the adjacent 24-hectare (60-acre) property and created Driving Creek Railway and Potteries in the Coromandel, with workshops and kilns, where he worked with other potters. The line for the railway runs through around 20,000 replanted native trees and is under the care of the Queen Elizabeth II National Trust. Much of the land for the track was cleared initially by hand with bulldozers later making it safe, and the lines were purchased from a local closed coal mine. Brickell said: "I wanted to demonstrate that you can have engineering in a rugged landscape and it could be good. Engineering doesn't have to be ugly." In October 1990 Driving Creek Railroad was opened officially under the Ministry of Transport.

Brickell met Theo Schoon through Len Castle.

He wrote several books and small publications, including A New Zealand Potters' Dictionary (1985) and Rails toward the Sky (2011). In 1996, Christine Leov-Lealand published the biography Barry Brickell: A Head of Steam. In 2013 Auckland University Press published the book His Own Steam: The Work of Barry Brickell to coincide with a major touring retrospective of his pottery work, organised by the Dowse Art Museum and featuring 100 of his pieces. In 2008 Brickell paid tribute to the recently deceased poet Hone Tuwhare, noting that his words [reminded him]... "of an albatross with wings outstretched and soaring. It would alight in unexpected places, showering humour, wicked fun and generosity where it was not always known".

Brickell noted in 2013 that most of his works hadn't been for sale, adding:

I've never wanted to sell anything. Selling and money are anathema to me. I have sold truckloads of pottery in order to make a living, in order to survive. It wasn't pleasant, but it was much better than school teaching, and I could dress as I wanted to. What I'm trying to say is the drudgery is still there of making money or surviving.

== Kiln-building ==
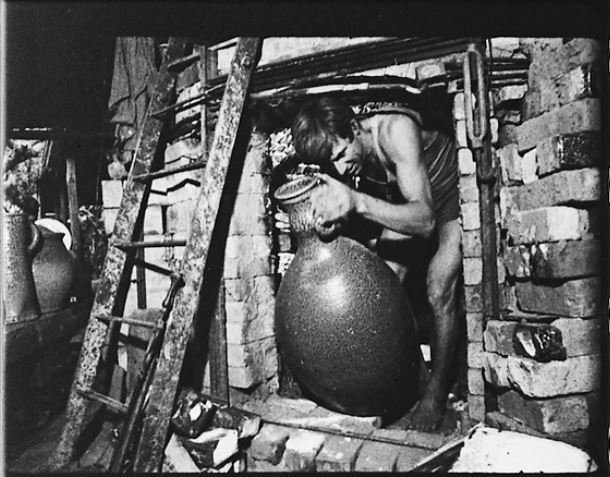
Brickell 1970

Brickell was known for his skill at building kilns. Most of the kilns at Driving Creek Railway were designed and built by Brickell using bricks made on-site from clay sourced on the same property. According to Christine Leov-Lealand's biography, Brickell built his first brick kiln at age seven under the family home in Devonport, which was almost set alight.

Brickell built his first homemade kiln in Freemans Bay in the mid-1950s, this acted as a social hub for fellow potters and artists such as Hamish Keith and Keith Patterson and paving the way for the establishment of dealer galleries like New Vision.

He built a round coal-fired kiln for potter Yvonne Rust in Greymouth in 1968, and in 1975, constructed another for artist Ralph Hotere in Port Chalmers, fired from pine bark recycled from a nearby wharf. In 1982, Brickell was invited to Vanuatu to build a kiln and establish a ceramics programme for young people, and in 1986, he built a wood-fired salt-glaze kiln for the Northern Arizona University Art Gallery.

== Selected exhibitions ==
The Press reported on 24 September 1964 that the Queen Elizabeth II Arts Council, the governing board of Creative New Zealand, had organised an exhibition of New Zealand ceramics and paintings to open in the Takashimaya store in Ginza, during the Tokyo Olympic Games. The exhibition, which was later to tour Malaysia and India, included work by Brickell as part of a selection, said by the Director of the Auckland Art Gallery, Peter Tomory, to show work that reflected the variety and professionalism in New Zealand and "help counter the impressions...[that New Zealand]...was a nation of shepherds".

In May 1966, Brickell, along with Len Castle, Doreen Blumhardt and Helen Mason, exhibited some of his work at the N.Z Painting and Pottery exhibition in London. In a 1969 exhibition at Several Arts Gallery in Christchurch, Brickell, who displayed a selection of "platters, jugs, bottles, beer mugs, a coffee set and fruit bowls", was described along with Yvonne Rust as one of the potters [who gave]..."strength to the exhibition".

The Leigh Yawkey Woodson Art Museum, located in Wausau, Wisconsin, held two exhibitions in 1988. One, called Treasures from the Land: Crafts from New Zealand, featured work that Lloyd Herman, the former director of the Museum said reflected the relationship between contemporary crafts in New Zealand and the Māori heritage, and Brickell's work exemplified the "special relationship between the craftsman and his land".

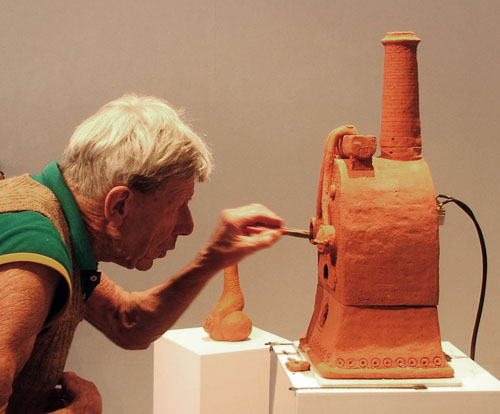
Barry Brickell stoking a miniature clay kiln at the opening of an exhibition at the Brett McDowell Gallery in Dunedin, October 2013.

Brickell was one of the artists featured in Treasures of the Underworld, the New Zealand pavilion exhibition at Seville Expo '92. The exhibition toured to the Netherlands and throughout New Zealand before the works were accessioned for the collection of the National Art Gallery, now held by the Museum of New Zealand Te Papa Tongarewa.

The 2013 exhibition His Own Steam, A Barry Brickell Survey, curated by Emma Bugden and David Craig, and held at the Dowse Art Museum, in Lower Hutt, located Brickell's work within the "great New Zealand art of the 1950s, 60s and 70s...[noted in the catalogue as]...making new forms to bring together images that have never been seen before. Perhaps they are a kind of anthropomorphic engineering that has grown out of the Pacific – open, generous and abundant".

A further exhibition at Te Uru Waitākere Contemporary Gallery in 2015, surveyed Brickell's work over 60 years. Exhibition notes describe his most well known form, the Spiromorphs as "large-scale spiral creations built from coiled clay...[which]...twist and unfold in expansive curves and visceral ridges, drawing on the relentless energy of nature. His work resonates with his often quoted mantra—'not the thing but how'—demonstrating his unique interest in the process of making, and the distinctiveness of a local voice". Two areas of Bricknell's work, stoneware and terracotta, were also displayed at the Quartz Museum of Studio Ceramics in Wanganui in 2015. A reviewer said the pieces reflect "playful humour mixed with a serious concern for sculptural form...[and]...are made with a sophistication and confidence which requires no adornment".

== Honours and awards ==
In 1974 Brickell was awarded a QEII Arts Council Grant to build New Zealand's first wood-fired stoneware pottery kiln, which he made with help from students, using bricks from a demolished hotel in the nearby town of Coromandel. He was appointed an Officer of the Order of the British Empire, for services to pottery and ceramics, in the 1988 New Year Honours. On 27 July 2016, Takapuna Grammar School opened an art studio in a tribute to Brickell as an ex-student. The school principal Mary Nixon said the studio "would acknowledge Brickell's work in art and conservation".

== Death ==
Brickell died at Coromandel on 23 January 2016.

== Publications ==
- A New Zealand Potter's Dictionary: Techniques and Materials for the South Pacific (1985)
- Six Spiromorphs (2009)
- Rails toward the Sky: The Story of Driving Creek Railway (2011)
- Plastic Memories: Thirty-Eight Years of Storytelling in Clay (2013)
- The hand is more important than the brain (1977)

== In popular culture ==
In 1971, a National Film Unit production called Barry Brickell - Potter, about Brickell's creative life on the Coromandel Peninsula, won first prize at the Venice International Film Festival.

Brickell appeared in Marcus Lush's 2004 documentary Off the Rails: A Love Story.

Barry Brickell appears in New Zealand film-maker David Sim's 2016 documentary The Last Fatso - and no maybes, based on Brickell's life and contribution to society.

== Works ==
- Works in the collection of the Museum of New Zealand Te Papa Tongarewa
- Works in the collection of the Govett-Brewster Art Gallery
- Works in the collection of Auckland War Memorial Museum
- Exhibitions at Brett McDowell Gallery, Dunedin in 2009 and 2012
- Works at Driving Creek Railway
- May Smith's 1969 painting From Barry Brickell's Verandah in the Fletcher Trust Collection
