= Rudolf Gopas =

New Zealand artist and art teacher (1913–1983)

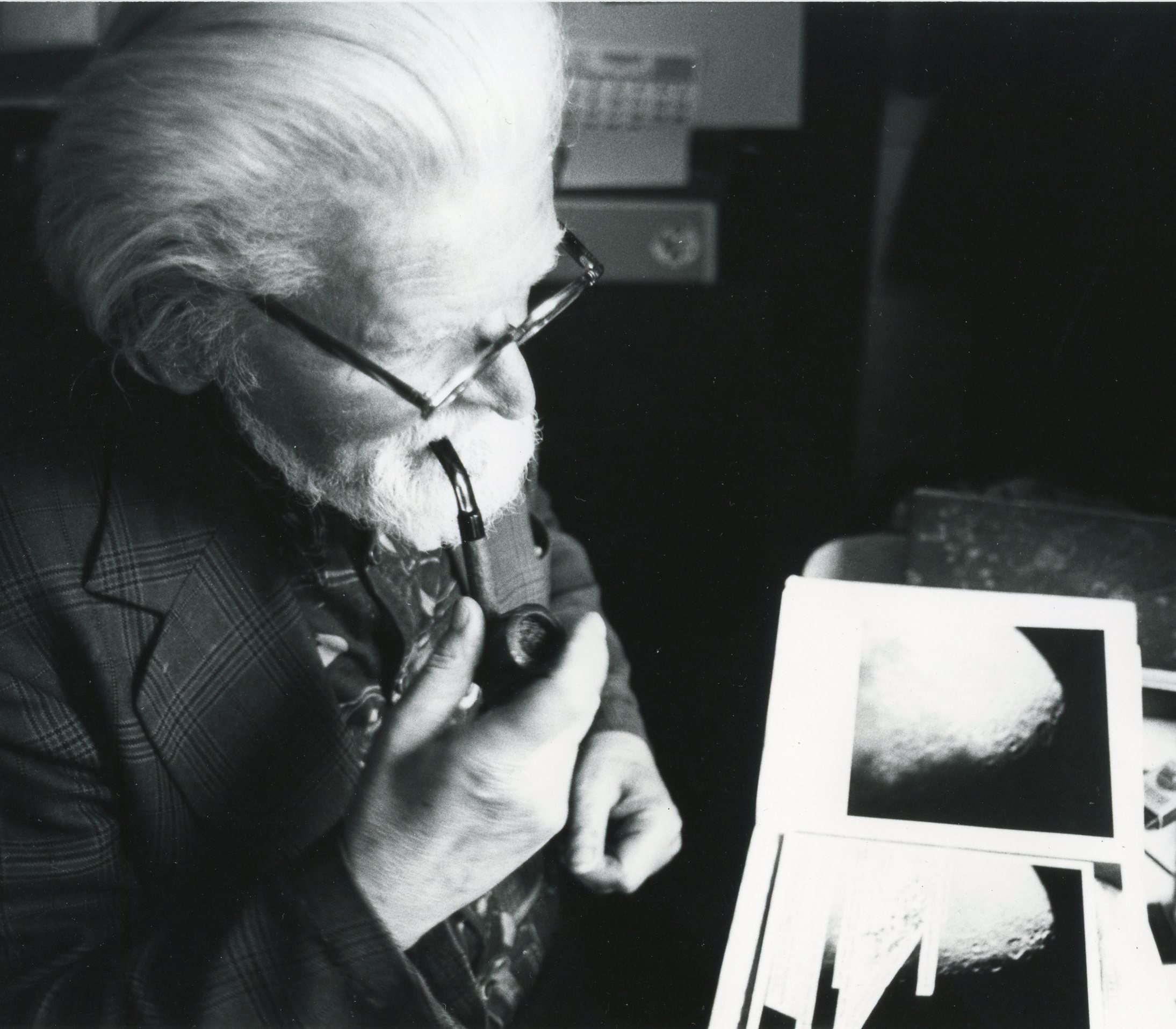
- Rudolph Gopas in his Christchurch studio, 1982
- Born: 13 December 1913; Šilutė, Germany (present day Lithuania)
- Died: 23 July 1983 (aged 69); Christchurch
- Known for: Painting and teaching

Rudolf Gopas (né Hopp, 13 December 1913 – 23 July 1983) was a New Zealand artist and art teacher. He was born in Šilutė, Germany (present day Lithuania). Gopas' works are held in the collections of the Auckland Art Gallery Toi o Tāmaki, the Museum of New Zealand Te Papa Tongarewa, Christchurch Art Gallery and the Hocken Library.

His second wife was the radio broadcaster Airini Nga Roimata Grennell.

== Biography ==
=== Early life and education ===
Gopas was born in Šilutė, Germany (present day Lithuania) in 1913. His parents were Pranas Gopas, a machinery merchant, and Marte Plauschin. Gopas' birthplace was near Nidden, a fishing village with a popular artists colony.

Gopas studied painting at the Kaunas Art School from 1933 to 1938. While studying, Gopas travelled in Germany, Austria, Italy, Latvia and Greece.

=== Career ===
During the occupation of Lithuania by Germany during World War II, Gopas served in the German army. He married Natalija (Natascha) Seeberg in 1942, in Ventspils, Latvia, and their daughter Sylvia was born in 1944. When the Russian army invaded later that year, the Gopas family fled to Germany. From 1944 to 1948, they lived in a refugee camp at Ehrwald, and Gopas made a living producing portrait and landscape paintings. In June 1949, Gopas, his wife, daughter and mother-in-law (Marte Seeberg) travelled to New Zealand on an Irish boat, the Dundalk-Bay, which brought New Zealand Government-assisted immigrants from central and eastern Europe. The family arrived in Wellington on 27 June 1949, and were housed temporarily at the Pahiatua refugee camp. They were resettled in Dunedin, and Gopas found work as a photo-processor with Coulls Somerville Wilkie Limited.

Once settled in New Zealand, Gopas began to re-establish himself as a painter. From 1949 to 1953, he exhibited works at the New Zealand Academy of Fine Arts in Wellington, and from 1951, he began to exhibit at the Otago Art Society. In 1951, Gopas and others formed The Independent Group, in response to The Group in Christchurch. Gopas was a regular exhibitor with The Group until its cessation in 1977. In Christchurch Gopas exhibited with the gallery Several Arts run by one of his ex-students Ngaire Hewson.

In 1953, Gopas left his wife and daughter in Dunedin and moved to Christchurch, where he worked for a photographic firm. He and his wife divorced in 1957. In Christchurch, on 25 November 1958, Gopas married the radio broadcaster Airini Nga Roimata Grennell.

Gopas was appointed as a temporary assistant lecturer in painting at the School of Fine Arts, University of Canterbury in 1959, and took up a permanent position in 1960. His students included Philip Trusttum, Philippa Blair, Philip Clairmont, Vivien Bishop, Gavin Bishop, Tony Fomison, John Coley, Barry Cleavin, Gerda Leenards and Kura Te Waru Rewiri. Gopas was considered by his students to be a "lively and controversial teacher [...] His reputation was not based so much on his painting as on his ability as a talker about art, and as a stirrer."

In 1976, Gopas and his second wife separated, and in 1977 Gopas resigned from his teaching role at the university and travelled to Ehrwald, Austria. He quickly became disillusioned and returned to New Zealand.

=== Illness and death ===
After Gopas' return to New Zealand in the late 1970s, his mental health deteriorated and he was committed to Sunnyside Hospital for periodic treatment. Suffering from alcoholism, Gopas' condition deteriorated, and his left leg was amputated above the knee due to circulatory issues. He made a partial recovery from this surgery before complications arose. On 23 July 1983, two weeks before the scheduled opening of the first exhibition dedicated to his life's work, Gopas died of a heart attack caused by arteriosclerosis, at his home in Christchurch.

== Exhibitions ==
Exhibition of paintings by Rudolf Gopas (1950), at Kendal Nisbet, Dunedin.

Group Loan Show (1960), at the Christchurch Art Gallery.

Galactic Landscapes 1965 - '67 (1967), at New Vision Gallery, Auckland.

Paintings for the Sun (1976), at the Christchurch Art Gallery.

Rudolph Gopas: A Retrospective Exhibition (1982) at the Govett-Brewster Art Gallery, New Plymouth. This exhibition subsequently toured throughout New Zealand during 1982–1984.

Gopas and His Students: Gopas, Clairmont, Frizzell, Trusttum, Te Waru Rewiri (2002) at Ferner Galleries, Auckland.
