= Denis Cohn Gallery =

New Zealand art gallery

General information
- Location: 3 Darby Street, Auckland CBD
- Coordinates: 36°50′58″S 174°45′52″E

The Denis Cohn Gallery was an art gallery founded by Denis Cohn, an influential dealer gallery in Auckland, New Zealand in the 1980s.

Born in Hale, England, Cohn's conversion to art came at the age of 14, at an exhibition of works by Henri Matisse and Pablo Picasso at the Manchester Art Gallery. Cohn became a precocious collector, looking for finds in junk shops. In his later teens Cohn moved to London, where he met painter Michael Ayrton, from whom he bought his first art work.

Cohn met his life partner Bil (William) Vernon in 1968. Six years later they moved to New Zealand, where Cohn worked as an industrial journalist and began buying New Zealand art, beginning with a work on paper by Colin McCahon. According to art critic Hamish Keith, Cohn "had a fine eye for art, but also a keen appreciation for a bargain. He saw New Zealand art as undervalued at a time when Auckland had a mere handful of struggling galleries mainly dealing in established names". This observation led Cohn to open his eponymous gallery.

Despite its relatively short period of operation (1978-1986), Cohn and his gallery were known for showing leading artists and supporting the careers of younger and newer artists, including Malcolm Harrison, Christine Hellyar, Tony Fomison, Philip Clairmont and Allen Maddox. He also sought out a younger market of collectors, who had not yet began buying established artists' works. After the gallery closed in 1986 Cohn continued to deal art from his home, and worked with partner Bil Vernon on museum and gallery software, which became Vernon Systems.

Denis Cohn died in Fiji on 14 December 2006, aged 73.

An archive of the gallery's operations in held by the Museum of New Zealand Te Papa Tongarewa.
