= Airini Grennell =

New Zealand singer, pianist, and broadcaster (1910–1988)

Airini Ngā Roimata Grennell (11 February 1910 – 8 December 1988) was a New Zealand singer, pianist, and broadcaster.

== Early life ==
Grennell was born in Waitangi, Chatham Islands, New Zealand, on 11 February 1910, the eldest of five children. Her father, William Henry Grennell, worked as a farmer and fisherman at Matarakau, Chatham Islands, and was of Ngāti Mutunga, Ngāti Tama, Irish and American descent. Grennell's mother, Mary Hazel Teripa Tikao, daughter of Hōne Taare Tīkao and Martha Hana Toku Horomona, was of Ngāi Tahu descent.

Around 1920, the Grennell family moved to the South Island, and lived in Akaroa and then Koukourarata. Grennell's parents were part of the Koukourarata concert party, run by an aunt, Rahera Tainui. The group performed regularly around Banks Peninsula, and later for servicemen and their families during World War II. Grennell is credited as being the first to sing in te reo Māori on a national radio network in 1927.

== Education ==
Grennell attended Sacred Heart Girls' College, Christchurch, where she developed an appreciation for music. Around the age of 18, Grennell travelled to England to study music professionally, and gained diplomas of licentiateship for musicianship (LTCL and LRSM) in teaching the piano and singing.

== Career ==
=== Methodist Home Mission Party (Waiata Māori Choir) ===
In 1935, Airini and her sister Hinemoa joined the Methodist Home Mission Party (also known as the Waiata Māori Choir), which was established in 1924 by Reverend Arthur John Seamer. The choir consisted of Māori singers and orators, and performed an eclectic repertoire, including religious, popular, indigenous and Western art music. Grennell became known affectionately as the 'Chatham Islands Nightingale' thanks to her talent as a soprano, and she was considered by many to be the leading soprano of the choir. Other members of the choir included Ana Tangaere, Hinemoa Karenera, Sister Olive, Hinerangi Hikuroa, Mereana Kaitaia, Weno Tahiwi, Mihi Waikare, Mori Erihana, Rangipeka Moerua, Marama Muriwai, Mori Pickering (née Ellison), Taka Ropata, Reverend Robert Tahupotiki Haddon, Te Uira Tutaeo Manihera and Inia Te Wiata. The choir toured Australia in December 1935, and England in 1937. The choir was presented to King George VI following his coronation, before disbanding in 1938.

=== Radio ===
In October 1938, Grennell joined the radio station 4ZB in Dunedin as a programme assistant. Her 'Songs of the Islands' session in 1940 was very popular. By the end of World War II, Grennell had moved to Auckland where she worked at 1ZB as a programme assistant. By 1949 she had returned to Christchurch, working with both 3YA and 3ZB as an announcer, and at 3YA she helped organise a radio series for women, and initiated a network of women's programming on national radio. While working at 4ZB, Grennell's performance of Songs of the Islands was especially well received. Grennell was the commentator for five royal tours. She continued her broadcasting career until her retirement in 1966.

== Personal life ==
On 11 February 1931, Grennell married Hone Wereta, a farmer of Ngāti Raukawa, and they had a daughter later that year. Grennell and Wereta separated during the 1930s. Hone died in March 1958. On 25 November 1958 Grennell married well-known Lithuanian artist Rudolf Gopas, and they had a daughter together. Gopas and Grennell separated in 1976, and Grennell cared for Gopas before his death in 1983.

== Retirement and death ==
Grennell became a respected leader of Horomaka Kāi Tahu and Taranaki–Wharekauri Ngāti Mutunga. Grennell's husband and daughter predeceased her, and after her death on 8 December 1988, Grennell's ashes were interred with theirs at the family burial ground at Te Rāpaki-o-Te Rakiwhakaputa.
