= Philippa Blair =

New Zealand artist (1945–2025)

- Born: Philippa Mary Blair; 18 November 1945; Christchurch, New Zealand
- Died: 5 January 2025 (aged 79); Auckland, New Zealand
- Spouses: James Hutchison (divorced); John Porter (died 2018)
- Children: 2
- Website: www.philippablair.com

Philippa Mary Blair (18 November 1945 – 5 January 2025) was a New Zealand artist. Her works are held in the collections of the Auckland Art Gallery Toi o Tāmaki, Museum of New Zealand Te Papa Tongarewa and the University of Auckland.

== Early life and education ==
Blair was born in Christchurch on 18 November 1945, the daughter of Grace Evelyn Blair (née Mackenzie) and Ian Douglas Blair. Her father was a microbiologist at Canterbury Agricultural College (now Lincoln University). Her mother was a professional soprano and pianist, and had studied art at Canterbury Art School where she was a contemporary of Rita Angus.

Blair studied at the University of Canterbury from 1965 to 1967, under Rudolf Gopas and Don Peebles. She graduated with a Diploma of Fine Arts (painting) in 1967. At age 22, Blair married and went to live at Wairoa, teaching art at the local college, before living in Australia for several years. It was at this point that she began to commit herself seriously to painting.

In 1976, Blair completed a Diploma of Teaching in Secondary School Fine Art at Secondary Teachers' College in Auckland.

== Career ==
Blair's early painting works produced while living in Australia include Open Window - Brisbane (1969) and Primary Reflection (Melbourne 1971). Initially, Blair's intuitive and expressionistic style was not readily accepted in New Zealand, but was accepted by Kees and Tina Hos who began exhibiting Blair's work at New Vision Gallery in Auckland from 1975.

Blair worked primarily as a painter, and made semi-abstract work. Her works from the 1980s are reminiscent of works by Jackson Pollock and Len Lye, which Blair was familiar with and admired for their 'movement' and 'fugitive' qualities. She worked as both a secondary school art teacher and university painting tutor from 1968 onwards.

Blair moved from New Zealand to the United States in 1995 with her husband John Porter, and they lived at Venice Beach and San Pedro, California before moving back to Auckland, New Zealand in 2015.

== Personal life and death ==
In 1967, Blair became engaged to James Drummond Hutchison. They married and had two children including the art curator and writer Alice Hutchison, but later divorced.

Blair died in Auckland on 5 January 2025, at the age of 79. She had been predeceased by her husband, John Porter, in 2018.

== Exhibitions ==
Blair exhibited as a solo artist and in group shows widely in New Zealand and the United States, including:

- Spaces, Mats and Carpets at New Vision Gallery, Auckland 1980. The works in this show were paintings built up through dense layers of splattered paint.
- Packapoo at RKS Art, Auckland in 1980.
- Three from New Zealand: Philippa Blair, Christine Hellyar, Ralph Hotere (group exhibition with Christine Hellyar and Ralph Hotere) at Long Beach Museum of Art in 1990.
- Philippa Blair, Survey 1987-1992 at the Centre for Contemporary Art, Hamilton in 1992.
- Philippa Blair: Traverse: Recent Paintings, Drawings, Lithographs at Spencer Gallery Wickford, RI and Janne Land Gallery Wellington in 1999.
- Transmotion: Drawings and Paintings at the DoubleVision Gallery, Los Angeles, California in 2001.
- Between Heaven and Earth (group exhibition with Lawrence Abrahamsen, Fran Bull and Don Lewallen) at Walter Wickiser Gallery, New York in 2003.
- Philippa Blair: A 10 Year Survey at Warwick Henderson Gallery, Auckland in 2004.
- Crossings at PGgallery192, Christchurch in 2015.
- Dancing Off Score at PGgallery192, Christchurch in 2018.

== Residencies and awards ==
Blair received grants from the Queen Elizabeth II Arts Council in 1980 and 1984. In 1984, she became the first New Zealander to participate in the artist-in-residence programme at the Canberra School of Art.
