= Juliet Kac =

New Zealand artist

Juliet Kac (born 1949) is a New Zealand artist. Kac was born in Wellington in 1949. Her mother was a teacher, and her family background was 'cultured', with frequent visits to concerts and ballet. Her father worked as a paint chemist, so Kac grew up in an environment where paint was readily available. Kac gained an MA in Fine Arts from the Elam School of Fine Arts in 1973.

Kac travelled by boat to Europe, and for several months travelled around the Mediterranean before settling in England where she lived for a while in Cambridge. Kac met her husband there, and they moved south together so he could study at Sussex University.

Kac was a founding member of North Star Studios, a printmaking cooperative in Brighton. Due to difficult family circumstances, Kac returned to New Zealand for a period of time, and was active in the arts scene. Kac exhibited at the New Zealand Academy of Fine Arts in 1982. In 1987, Kac exhibited at the Mt Victoria cafe with three other Wellington-based artists - Patricia Susan Fry, Gerda Leenards and Eve Halliwell.

In 1987 Kac returned to Brighton, and has remained there since. She gained a PhD from the University of Brighton in 2003.

Kac's PhD thesis explored the relationship between music and painting, with reference to Frantisek Kupka, and to Kac's personal art practice. She was supervised by Professor Michael Tucker. Kac is an active artist, and currently teaches portraiture.
