= Bronwynne Cornish =

New Zealand ceramicist, sculptor and arts educator

- Born: Bronwynne Cornish; 1945 (age 80–81); Wellington, New Zealand
- Known for: Ceramics, pottery
- Notable work: Home is where the Heart is (1982)

Bronwynne Cornish (born 1945) is a New Zealand ceramicist, sculptor and arts educator.

== Early life ==
Cornish was born in Wellington in 1945. Her parents separated when she was three years old and with her father Cornish moved first to Napier and then to Taranaki where she attended Hawera Technical High School.

== Career ==
Cornish enrolled to study industrial design at the Wellington Polytechnic School of Design. While studying she lived with James Coe, the head of the School, and his wife Jemi, working as an au pair. In 1965, part way through the three year diploma, she left Wellington Polytechnic and enrolled at the Wellington College of Education, where her tutors included influential potter Doreen Blumhardt.

While living in Wellington, Cornish became acquainted with potter Helen Mason and started experimenting with clay. In 1969 she moved to Auckland and started making work at the Nihotipu pottery in the Waitākere Ranges, which was sold at the early Auckland craft co-operative The Mill. Her first significant solo exhibition China Cabinet Curiosities was held at the New Vision Gallery in Auckland in 1971 and she has been consistently making earthenware work since.

== Artworks and major exhibitions ==
One of Cornish's key early ceramic installations is Home is where the Heart is (1982). First shown at the Denis Cohn Gallery in Auckland, the work is made up of 365 individual pieces, one for each day or the year, including the forms of cats, clothes pegs, tuatara, sphinxes and a small temple. The work was purchased by director James Mack for The Dowse Art Museum; Mack described the work as "one of the most important ceramic statements ever made in New Zealand." The work was reproduced in Anne Kirker's New Zealand Women Artists: A Survey of 150 Years in 1993: Kirker included one of Cornish's statements about the work in her text

Home is where the Heart is is about the female mysteries, and as such must remain cloaked in a certain amount of hiddenness, its true meaning visible only to those who can read the signs. With these arrangements I like to create an open 'framework' on which people can hang their own stories and interpretations, thus the pieces can be read and enjoyed on many levels.

In 1983 Cornish was selected to be part of a series of exhibitions at Auckland Art Gallery where artists were invited to choose a gallery space and make an exhibition or installation for it. Cornish produced a multi-part ceramic installation titled Dedicated to the Kindness of Mothers. The installation consisted of three major elements, centred on the form of a giant woman laid on the floor made from local basalt stone, accompanied by three urns filled with fresh flower arrangements and 52 clay masks of skulls, lit with coloured lights. Reviewing the work for Art New Zealand, art historian Elizabeth Eastmond wrote:

Although she is obviously concerned with aspects of the Prehistoric and with ritual and magic (a concern which places the work in the context of an international stream of recent and current art-making) the effectiveness of Cornish's piece, for me, lies in her ability to make the work speak in the present. The baffling animation of the face does this as much as anything: but also crucial are Cornish's aesthetically rigorous selection and organisation of her component parts an importantly (although an alternative to an original idea) her use of the magenta-pink neon lights, which cast their hazy glow from floor level up over the skulls. This characteristically modern lighting form creates the necessary tension with the other elements of the piece and makes for an effective dialog with the minimalist style of the gallery space.

In 1986 Dedicated to the Kindness of Mothers was featured in Eastmond and Merimeri Penfold's book Women and the arts in New Zealand - Forty Works: 1936-86. The sculpture had been moved to Cornish's garden, with seasonally variable planting: when photographed for the book this included alyssum and baby's tears, but the authors noted Cornish was 'considering a winter planting of red cabbage and curly kale'. Cornish went on to make three more clay goddess sculptures, one made from lumps of unfired clay and two fired in situ by building a fire over them.

In 1984, prompted by her interest in Neolithic artifacts, Cornish visited Silbury Hill and Avebury Henge in Wiltshire, and in 1988 she travelled to the megalithic mounds at Newgrange in Ireland to observe the winter solstice. Pottery shards appeared in works from her 'Morphic Resonances' series: the artist stated 'I think the fascination of the shards for me lies in the history they carry with them, having already passed through many hands while in the process of being formed, fired, decorated, purchased, owned, used, broken, lost ... A broken vessel engages my mind in a way a whole one never does'.

Cornish had solo shows at the Govett-Brewster Art Gallery in 1986, City Gallery Wellington in 1988 and Auckland Art Gallery in 2002. In 1996 she was selected by New Zealand artist and curator Jim Viviaere as part of a group of artists to represent New Zealand at the second Asia Pacific Triennial of Contemporary Art in Brisbane. In 1999 she held the Tylee Cottage Residency in Whanganui.

In 2014 a major survey of Cornish's work between 1982 and 2013, titled 'Mudlark', was organised by MTG Hawke's Bay and also shown at the Gus Fisher Gallery in Auckland. The exhibition showed at The Dowse Art Museum in 2015.

== Public collections ==
Cornish's work is held in many public collections, including the Auckland War Memorial Museum, The Dowse Art Museum, the New Zealand Ministry of Foreign Affairs and Trade, The Wallace Collection, Auckland, the Museum of New Zealand Te Papa Tongarewa, and the Kobayashi Collection, Tokyo.

== Further information ==
- Gordon Brown, 'Exhibitions: Auckland', Art New Zealand, no. 17, Spring 1980
- Alistair Paterson, 'Clay Poets:The Art of Denis O'Connor and Peter Hawkesby', Art New Zealand, no. 20, Winter 1981
- Elizabeth Eastmond, 'Bronwynne Cornish's Dedicated to the Kindness of Mothers', Art New Zealand, no. 30, Autumn 1984
- Virginia Were, 'Coming to terms with impermanence', Art News New Zealand, Autumn 2014
- Bronwynne Cornish interviewed about Home Is Where The Heart Is 2015
