= Gerda Leenards =

New Zealand artist

Gerda Leenards (born 1946) is a New Zealand artist. Her works are held in the collections of Te Papa and the University of Auckland.

== Biography ==
Gerda Leenards
- Born: 1946 (age 79–80); Nijmegen, Netherlands

Leenards was born in Nijmegen, Netherlands in 1946. She emigrated to New Zealand in 1956 at the age of 10. She attended the Ilam School of Art at the University of Canterbury where she studied under Rudi Gopas, Doris Lusk and Bill Sutton.

Leenards started exhibiting in 1982, and taught as an art teacher with a correspondence school for many years.

Known for her atmospheric paintings, in particular of Fiordland, Leenards has long been influenced by both the drama of New Zealand's natural environment and the tradition of Dutch landscape painting.

Between 2007 and 2008, Gerda was involved in a series of artist trips to China, supported by The Asia NZ Foundation. In 2008, Leenards conducted a research trip to China's Guangxi province.

Leenards was married to book designer and jewellery maker Lindsay Missen, who passed away in 2022 at age 75.

Leenards is featured in Peta Carey's 2010 documentary titled The Waterfall, created for TVNZ’s Artsville slot. The Waterfall follows four contemporary New Zealand artists (Nigel Brown, Melvin Day, Gerda Leenards, and John Walsh) as they embark on a journey through Fiordland. Their five-day expedition takes them in the footsteps of William Hodges, the artist on board during Captain Cook's 1773 voyage. Individually they craft their own artistic response to the region's landscapes and legacies.

== Exhibitions ==
- Gerda Leenards: Fjords, Mists, and Vapour, City Gallery Wellington, 2003.
- Gerda Leenards: Following the Blue Ribbon, City Gallery Wellington, 2009.
- Gerda Leenards: Following the Blue Ribbon - Journeys on the River Li, Te Whare Toi o Heretaunga | Hastings Art Gallery, 2014.
- Light Through Darkness: An interplay of paintings, works on mirrors, and jewellery, The Diversion Gallery, 2015.
- Tree-scapes: reminiscences, Pātaka Art + Museum, Porirua, 2016.
- A story of a lake through time, Toi MAHARA, Waikanae, 2024.
