= Nigel Brown =

New Zealand artist (born 1949)

Nigel Brown ONZM
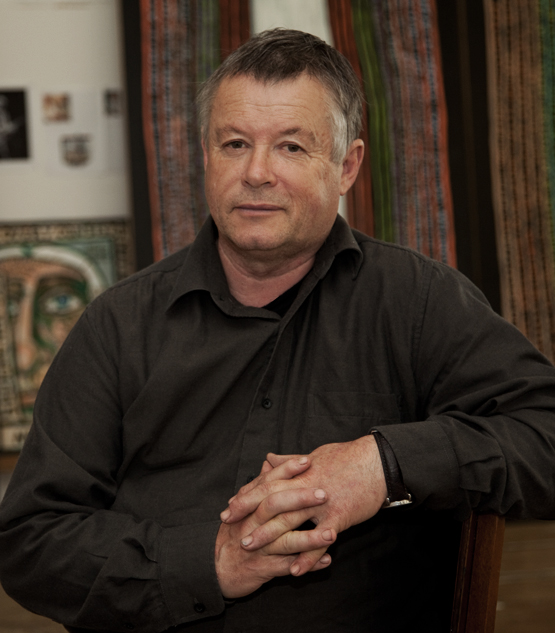
- Brown in 2011
- Born: Nigel Roderick Brown; 1949 (age 76–77); Invercargill, New Zealand
- Education: Tauranga Boys' College
- Alma mater: Elam School of Art

For the British chairman, see Nigel Brown.

Nigel Roderick Brown ONZM (born 1949) is a New Zealand painter living in Dunedin, New Zealand.

== Early years ==
Born in Invercargill in 1949, Brown grew up in Tauranga and was fortunate to have the established artist Fred Graham as an art teacher at Tauranga Boys' College. Between 1968 and 1971 he attended Elam School of Art, gaining valuable wisdom and inspiration from teachers Robert Ellis, Pat Hanly, Colin McCahon, Garth Tapper and Greer Twiss. Brown first began exhibiting in 1972 and his highly praised Lemon Tree series (1977) helped to consolidate his position in the art scene.

== Career ==
In 1981, he was awarded a QEII Arts Council Grant for travel to the United States, the United Kingdom and Western Europe. On his return, the impact of the Springbok tour protests, as well as a period living with fellow neo-expressionist artist Philip Clairmont that same year, had a lasting impression on Brown. A founding member of the pressure group VAANA (Visual Artists Against Nuclear Arms) in 1984, Brown's paintings and prints of this period tackled relevant issues not only on nuclear weaponry but also on feminism and the peace movement. This culminated in his 1985 exhibition Living in the Bomb Age, at the Dunedin Public Art Gallery.

Brown's practice examines his direct and personal articulation of the realities of the human condition. He draws on the relationship between human beings and their environment. Symbolism such as the fern, black singlet, dog and driveway, James K. Baxter and Captain Cook, all reflect his experience, his observations and his beliefs. He has incorporated these themes and symbols into his practice over a period of more than 40 years.

In his early work he combined a tension and personal narrative centred on social issues in New Zealand topography. His later work included the socio-political world of the distinctly New South Pacific, while in his current practice, he continues to emphasize his vision of a New Zealand identity.

Brown has also undertaken two significant stained glass window designs – St Mary's Catholic Church, Auckland (1991) and Holy Trinity Cathedral, Parnell (1998). In 1998 he travelled to Antarctica as part of the inaugural 'Artist to Antarctica' programme.

One of Nigel Brown's works, 'Variation on Landfall 90 1969' was included in the Landfall Exhibition, held at the Dunedin Railway Station in May/June 2018. Inspired by the Landfall 90, June 1969 cover, this painted work focuses on the original cover, adding a range of artists and writers who feature inside.

== Awards ==
In the 2004 New Year Honours, Brown was appointed an Officer of the New Zealand Order of Merit, for services to painting and printmaking, and in 2005 Brown was awarded a three-week residency in Russia hosted by the New Zealand ambassador in Moscow.
