= New Vision Gallery =

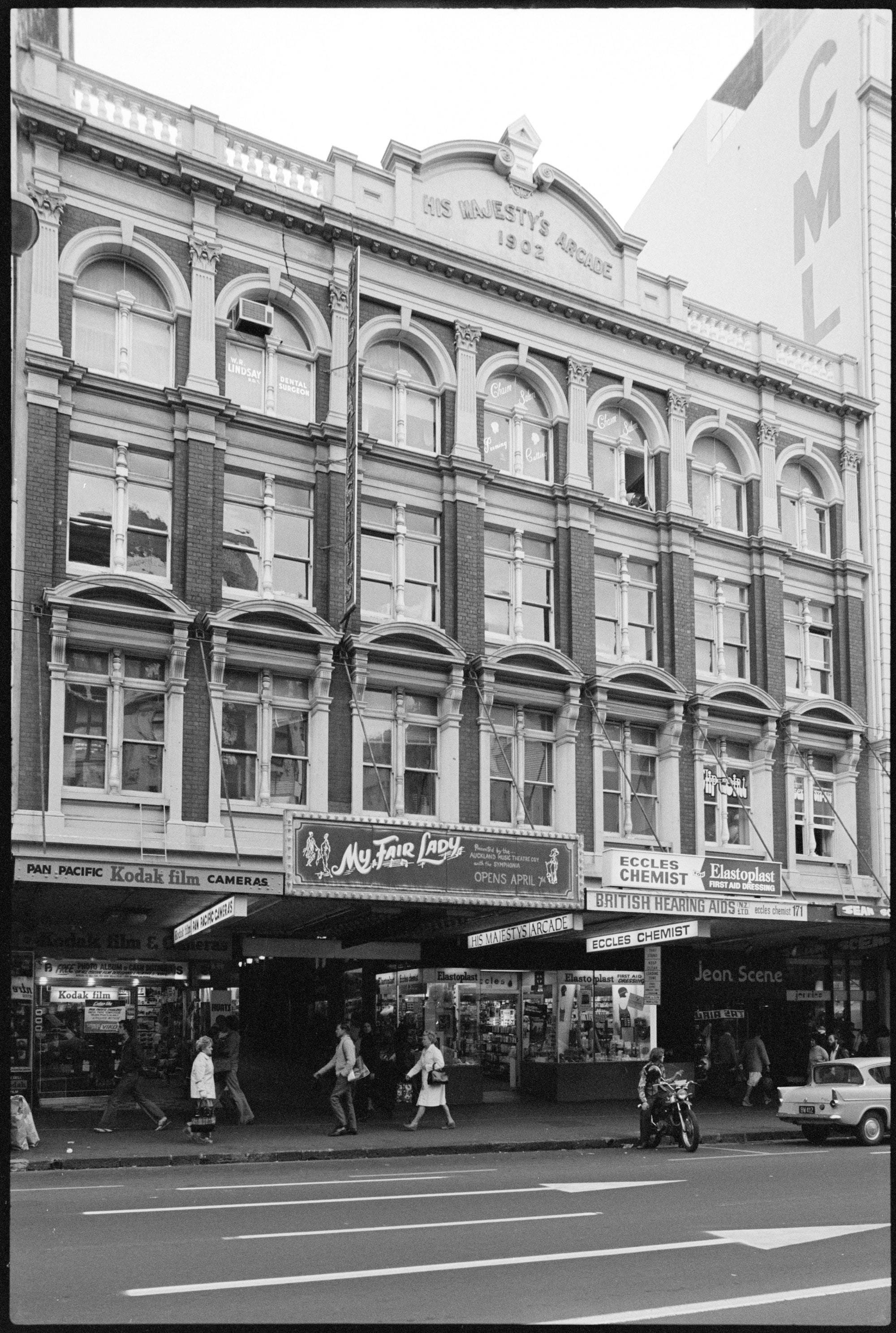
- His Majesty's Arcade on Queen Street, which housed the New Vision Gallery (pictured in 1977)
- Established: 1957
- Dissolved: October 1986
- Location: Auckland, New Zealand
- Type: Art gallery
- Founders: Kees Hos and Tina Hos

New Vision Gallery was a contemporary craft and art gallery operating in Auckland, New Zealand in the 1950s, 1960s and 1970s.

== History ==
The Gallery was established in 1957 by Dutch artists Kees (Cornelis) Hos (born 1916, The Hague, Netherlands - died 3 December 2015), a printmaker and painter, and his wife, weaver Tina (Albertine) Hos (died 1976), who emigrated to New Zealand from the Netherlands in 1956. Kees and Tina Hos originally opened the New Vision Craft Centre in Takapuna with the aim of making high quality work by New Zealand craftspeople available to the public. The gallery was named after Bauhaus artist László Moholy-Nagy's influential book The New Vision, from Material to Architecture. It became one of a small number of retail spaces and dealer galleries, including Helen Hitchings Gallery in Wellington (opened 1949) and Brenner Associates in Auckland, that showed contemporary craft alongside fine art and design.

In early 1959 the Hoses moved New Vision to His Majesty's Arcade in central Auckland, and it became the city's first retail outlet focused on New Zealand potters, jewellers, weaver, and other craftspeople. New Vision became the first retail outlet in Auckland city to concentrate exclusively on the work of New Zealand potters and other craftspeople. In the following years the Hoses became New Zealand's leading dealers for the applied arts. In 1965 the Hoses secured space above the craft gallery to open another gallery, devoted to contemporary art. The decision to open the second gallery was prompted by the closure of the Ikon Gallery, one of the few dealer galleries in Auckland at the time.

New Vision was one of few dealer galleries in New Zealand to embrace abstract art. Gordon Walters and Theo Schoon had their first solo shows here, and the Hoses were early supporters of expressionist painter Philip Trusttrum. Art historian Andrew Paul Wood notes:

The influence of New Vision on the Auckland art scene at the time was phenomenal, and aside from exhibiting, the Hoses gave tremendous moral support and friendship to a number of artists, including Colin McCahon. They were a rare thing in those days, champions of modernism and abstraction, though not exclusively, and a point of contact with developments in Europe.

The gallery also held important applied arts shows. Jeweller Jens Hoyer Hansen held his first solo show there in 1960. In 1970 the gallery staged Silver, Gold, Greenstone, the first substantial exhibition of contemporary jewellery in New Zealand. The exhibition included jewellers Kobi Bosshard, Jens Hansen, Gunter Taemmler and Ida Hudig, as well as artists not seen primarily as jewellers, including Paul Beadle, Theo Schoon and Edward Kindleysides. Ceramicist Bronwynne Cornish had her first significant solo exhibition, China Cabinet Curiosities, at the gallery in 1971.

In 1971, Kees Hos moved to Melbourne, where he had been invited to establish and lead the School of Art and Design at the Gippsland Institute of Advanced Education (now Monash University). Tina Hos remained in Auckland to manage the gallery. Tina Hos died in September 1976 and Pam Beca (later Donnelly) continued to run the business until it was taken over in 1981 by James Peters. New Vision closed in October 1986. Kees Hos died on 3 December 2015. The Arcade and Theatre building was demolished in December 1987-January 1988.

An exhibition examining the history of the gallery, curated by Joanna Trezise, was held at the Gus Fisher Gallery in 2008.

== Artists ==
Artists shown at New Vision Gallery include:

- Barry Brickell
- Kobi Bosshard
- Len Castle
- Philip Clairmont
- Barry Cleavin
- Bronwynne Cornish
- John Drawbridge
- Don Driver
- Ted Dutch
- Louise Henderson
- Richard Killeen
- Ted Kindleysides
- Michael Illingworth
- Milan Mrkusich
- John Parker
- Patricia Perrin
- Theo Schoon
- Mirek Smíšek
- Pauline Thompson
- Philip Trusttum
- Gordon Walters
