= Driving Creek Railway =

Railway in New Zealand

Coordinates: 36.7369°S 175.5040°E

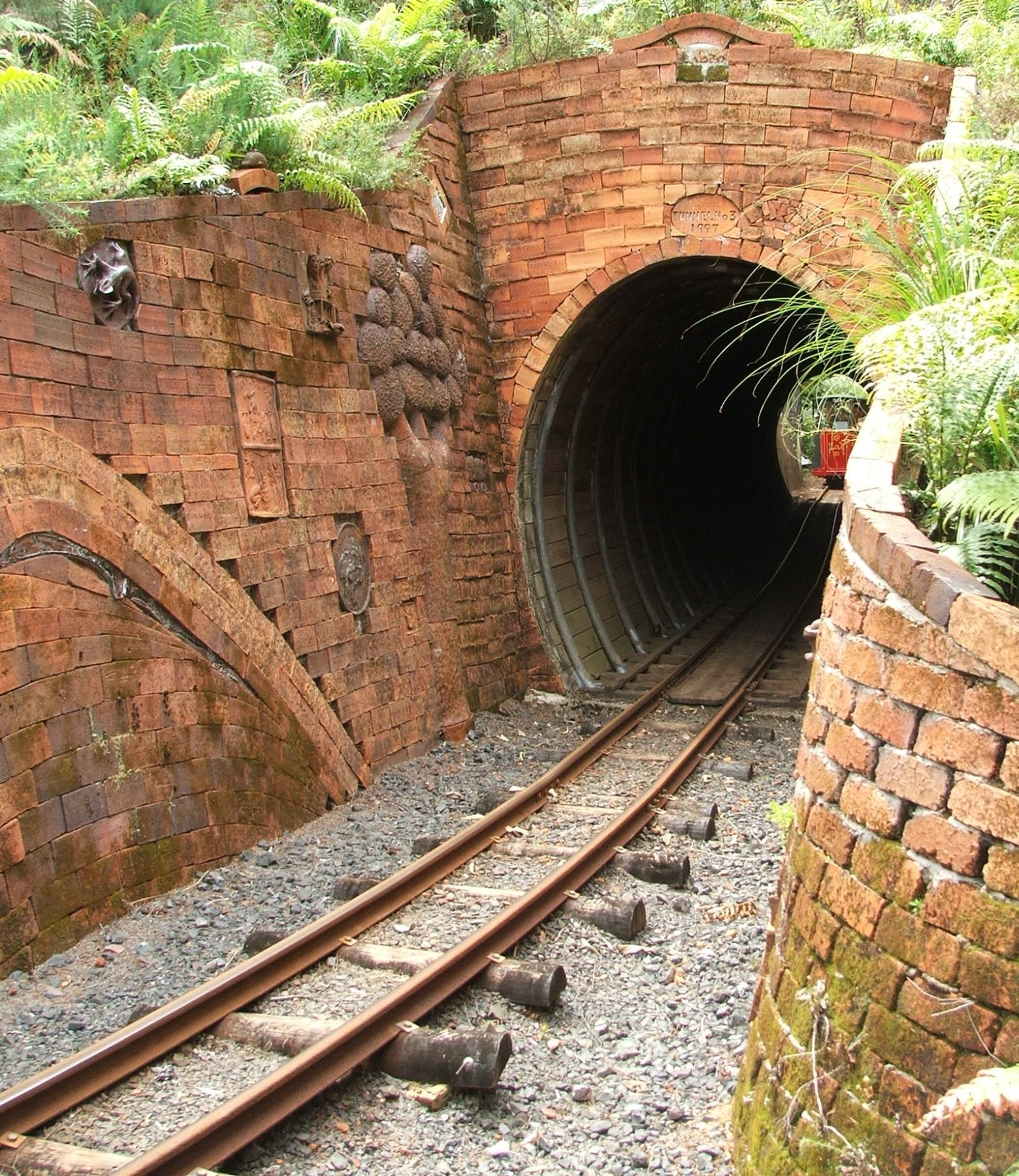
- Tunnel № 3, just beyond the fourth reversing point at Horopito. The railcar Linx can just be seen at the far end of the tunnel.
- Locale: Coromandel, New Zealand, New Zealand
- Terminus: 'Eyefull Tower'

Commercial operations
- Built by: Barry Brickell
- Original gauge: 15 in (381 mm)

Preserved operations
- Stations: Two
- Length: ca 3 km
- Preserved gauge: 15 in (381 mm)

Commercial history
- Opened: 1975 (initially for private use only)

The Driving Creek Railway is a narrow gauge bush and mountain railway on the outskirts of the provincial town of Coromandel on the northwestern coast of the Coromandel Peninsula on New Zealand's North Island. The railway leads up the mountain to a viewing platform building 165 metres (541 ft) high above the surrounding Coromandel west coast country.

== History ==
The original line was built by the potter Barry Brickell on his 22-hectare property, which he had acquired in 1961, aiming to start a pottery collective. He started construction of the 15-inch gauge rail line in 1975, originally mainly using it to transport clay and pine wood fuel to his kiln.

In 1975, Brickell purchased a larger 60 hectares (150 acres) block of land, and began working on what would become the Driving Creek Railway and Potteries. The new line would be of 15 in (381 mm) gauge instead of 10 1/2 in (267 mm) gauge, and would serve the same purpose as the original, to bring clay and firewood down from the slopes above the potteries. It would also be used to help re-plant the hillsides on Brickell's property with kauri and other native plants.

The Driving Creek Railway (DCR) was slowly expanded over the next 25 years to become one of the very few completely new railway lines in New Zealand in recent years. The project required significant civil engineering works due to the steep and complex terrain that the line traverses. Among these are the famous Double-Deck viaduct, three tunnels, ten bridges (including the Double-Deck Viaduct) and inclines as steep as 1 in 14. There is also a short branchline from the potteries to a firewood drying shed, including a short bridge, bridge № 1A, just behind the workshops at Driving Creek; this line is not used by passenger trains, although passengers will see the drying shed as their train climbs from № 1 bridge towards the Lower Spiral. The trip takes approximately 1 hour return.

The line terminates at the Eyefull Tower, completed in 2004 as the final terminus of the railway. The design of the building was based on the Bean Rock Lighthouse in Auckland, and includes a large viewing deck which was added in 2005 at Brickell's suggestion. The view from the Tower has been compared to the Kereta Hill layover just north of Coromandel, although Brickell maintained that the view from the Eyefull Tower was better than that from the Kereta layover.

The attraction now brings over 30,000 people to the railway per year, with much of the proceeds funding nature conservation works.

=== 2004 washout ===
In 2004, unseasonally heavy rain caused a major slip on the approaches to the Double-Deck Viaduct, damaging the track leading to the bridge from № 2 'Taniwha' tunnel and the higher-level track above leading into the Hoki Mai loop. A further slip occurred just above the № 3, or Cascade, switchback. Due to the damage, trains were forced to terminate just beyond the 'Taniwha' tunnel, where passengers could see the damage.

The line was repaired shortly after; this entailed the construction of two bridges, one on the lower level and one on the higher level, which included the points at the southern end of the Hoki Mai loop. A concrete retaining wall was constructed at Cascade to prevent further slips from blocking the railway.

== Trains ==
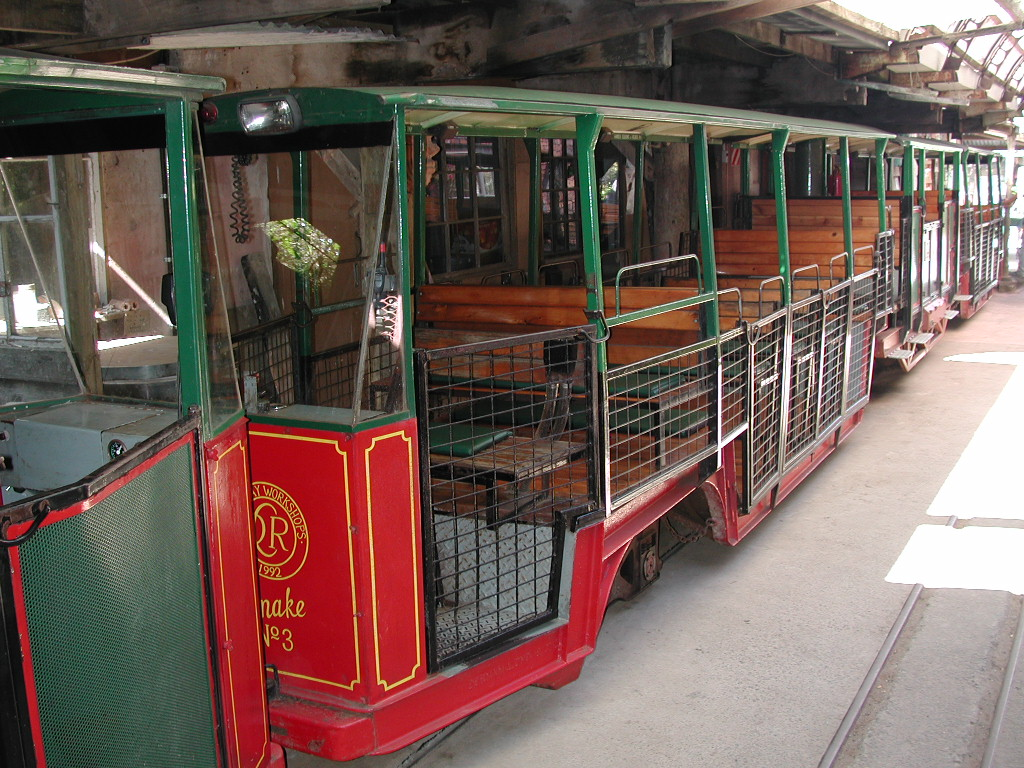
Carriages of Snake awaiting departure

The line operates a number of items of rolling stock, the most important of which are the three diesel railcars, which were built on site by the railway's own workshops. Possum (1999) is a 14-seater one-car unit, and Snake (1992) and Linx (2004) are 36-seater, three-unit articulated Railcars.

The railway also operates two diesel locomotives; Dieselmouse, an 0-4-0DM built in 1979 and the first locomotive used on the DCR, and Elephant, an 0-4-4-0DM built in 1980. In his book Rails toward the Sky, Barry Brickell stated that Dieselmouse is harder to drive, and is used as a shunting engine around the potteries and firewood drying shed. Elephant, being more powerful, is used on work trains and to haul Possum, Snake, and Linx in the event of a mechanical failure. It can also haul the line's solitary passenger carriage, nicknamed the 'Vintage Train', in times when extra capacity is required.

== Site features ==
The line climbs the hill behind Brickell's pottery, changing direction five times at reversing points to zigzag across the face of the hill. At the terminus is a wooden building, the "Eyefull Tower". Although this is a pun on the name Eiffel Tower (and on the wide land and sea views from the tower), its octagonal design is based on a much nearer landmark, the Bean Rock Lighthouse in Auckland Harbour.

There are a variety of other features on the site, such as a growing areas of re-planted native forest (including kauri), a wildlife sanctuary and a sculpture park (throughout the site and along the rail line, varying pottery and brick artworks abound, and also include retaining walls made of glass bottles).
