= Malcolm Harrison =

New Zealand clothing designer and textile artist (1941–2007)

- Born: Malcolm Armstrong Harrison; 3 September 1941; Christchurch, New Zealand
- Died: 2 November 2007 (aged 66); Waiheke Island, New Zealand
- Known for: Clothing design, textile art
- Notable work: The Family, These are Matters of Pride, Whanaungatanga
- Movement: Contemporary textile art
- Awards: Creative New Zealand Craft/Object Art Fellowship (2004)

Malcolm Armstrong Harrison (3 September 1941 – 2 November 2007) was a New Zealand clothing designer and textile artist.

== Career ==
Born in Christchurch, Harrison started his career as a window dresser with the D.I.C department store in his home town, while taking night classes in patternmaking. In the 1960s he worked as a clothing designer in Auckland. In 1961, aged 19, he was a finalist in the New Zealand Gown of the Year competition; in 1962 he won second place in the competition with an embroidered and beaded dress called Scheherazade. Harrison worked with Auckland fashion designer Colin Cole before opening his own boutique, Jasper Johnsons Jamboree, in Takapuna, and developed a reputation for his gowns, bespoke suits and bridal wear.

In the 1970s, Harrison shifted his practice from clothing production to quiltmaking, beginning a successful career as a textile artist. His early works were quilts made from dress fabric scraps. His first quilt exhibition was shown in 1979 at the Denis Cohn Gallery in Auckland. These works "reflected fabric art trends of the time - traditional American quilting techniques depicted subjects including Kiwi aviation pioneer Richard Pearse".

Harrison credited Denis Cohn for giving his artistic career a major boost. Cohn introduced Harrison to Wellington art dealer Janne Land, who showed his work regularly until his death.

Throughout his textile career, Harrisons's work ranged from large-scale quilts to smaller needlepoint canvases and simple works stitched on cloth. Textile historian Ann Packer recognises Harrison as “the man who pioneered quilting as an art form in New Zealand...a storyteller par excellence who creates his narratives in stitch.”

=== Major works and commissions ===
The Family is a popular and well-known collection of 35 dolls crafted by Harrison over 30 years and exhibited widely throughout New Zealand. The Family was first exhibited at The Dowse Art Museum in 1987, and was re-exhibited several times, including in 2005 and 2014.

In 1994, the Parliamentary Service Commission appointed Harrison to design and oversee the creation of two large-scale works for Parliament Buildings in Wellington. The two works, These are Matters of Pride and Whanaungatanga (Relationships), combined Māori weaving traditions with European embroidery practices and drew upon the skills of four Māori weavers and over 700 embroiderers. They took two years to complete.

Other commissions include Oceania, located in the Bank of New Zealand tower in Queen Street in Auckland, and work in the North Shore City Council Chambers.

=== Recognition ===
In 1992, Harrison represented New Zealand at the Fibre Triennial in Łódź, Poland.

In 2004 Harrison was awarded the inaugural Creative New Zealand Craft/Object Art Fellowship, worth $65,000. He created a new body of work as recipient of the award, drawing inspiration from Francisco Goya's etching, The Sleep of Reason Produces Monsters (c. 1799). The works were shown at an exhibition titled Minus Reason at Auckland gallery Objectspace in 2005.

== Legacy ==
Since Harrison's death on Waiheke Island in 2007, a number of exhibitions have been staged surveying his work or linking his career to that of other artists.

Objectspace staged a memorial exhibition, Requiem, in 2008. Malcolm Harrison: A celebration, a touring survey exhibition of Harrison's work, showed at the Waiheke Community Art Gallery in 2017. The exhibition included quilt works, tapestries, assemblages, small sculpture, works on paper, poetry, and illustrations and texts for children's books.

In 2018 The Dowse Art Museum will show Sleeping Arrangements, an exhibition that brings a selection of Harrison's quilts together with works by three other artists of different generations to his own: Grant Lingard (1961–1995), Zac Langdon-Pole (b. 1988), and Micheal McCabe (b. 1994).

Harrison's work is held in the collections of Museum of New Zealand Te Papa Tongarewa and The Dowse Art Museum.
