= Allen Maddox =

English–New Zealand painter (1948–2000)

- Born: 1948; Liverpool, England
- Died: 2000 (aged 51–52); Napier, New Zealand
- Education: School of Fine Arts, Canterbury University
- Movement: Abstract expressionism

Allen Maddox (1948 – 23 August 2000) was an English-born New Zealand painter, known for his bold abstract works and specifically his use of the cross motif.

== Biography ==
Born in Liverpool, Maddox migrated to New Zealand in 1963 with his family. He studied painting briefly at the School of Fine Arts at Canterbury University before dropping out to pursue an advertising career. Maddox had his first solo dealer show at the Elva Bett Gallery in Wellington in 1973.

Maddox was often paired with fellow artists and good friends Philip Clairmont and Tony Fomison, a grouping known as the 'Militant Artists Union'. All three were known for their bohemian lifestyles, expressionist painting style and heavy use of alcohol and drugs. A certain amount of mythology built up around the artists' friendships and lives. Richard McWhannell wrote in his obituary of Maddox:

The name Allen Maddox is associated with much myth and speculation. Most is hearsay and by nature erroneous. It's fair to say he was no regular chap. He suffered from a psychological illness described as schizophrenia and his psychosis was mostly controlled by medication. However the drugs were very strong and there were times when he wanted to be free of their debilitating side effects. And so there were the occasional spectacular incidents when the controls weren't there or weren't enough. Yes there were times when he went 'off' and in his words, did 'some terrible things'. Those regrettable things were to seriously stigmatise him. Part cause, I believe, that he was never given a solo public exhibition, nor has been properly represented by certain public collections.

Maddox was best known for his use of a cross/X motif in his work, said to have emerged when he emphatically crossed out a failed work in 1976. Art historian William McAloon described the motif as 'something of a self-portrait', referring to the regularity with which the artist returned to it. The motif has been interpreted in all manner of ways, including as "a symbol of anonymity, failure, Christianity, the unknown, the illiterate".

Maddox died in Napier in 2000, aged 51. A memorial exhibition was organised by City Gallery Wellington. Curators Gregory O'Brien and Rebecca Wilson described his work as "probably the most thorough and impassioned instance of abstract expressionist art yet produced in this country."

Maddox's works are held in public collections across New Zealand, including the Museum of New Zealand Te Papa Tongarewa, Auckland Art Gallery, the Sarjeant Art Gallery and Christchurch Art Gallery.
