= Matarakau Point =

Coordinates: 43°44′03″S 176°20′55″W

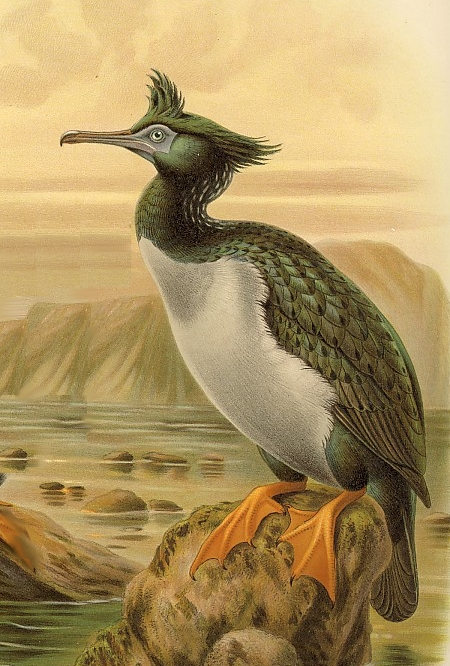
Pitt shag, illustrated by Keulemans

Matarakau Point is a headland on the north coast, and 13 km from the easternmost point, of the main Chatham Island in the Chatham Islands group of New Zealand. It has been identified as an Important Bird Area by BirdLife International because it supports breeding colonies of the critically endangered Chatham and endangered Pitt shags.
