= David Sims (director) =

New Zealand film director

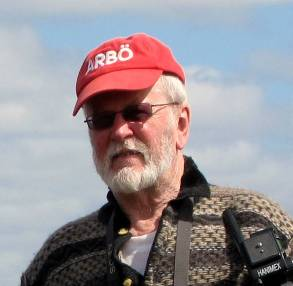
David Sims

David Sims is a New Zealand film director. He commenced his career at the National Film Unit, making his first film in 1968. Since then he has directed over 40 films. These films included Rutherford of Nelson (1972), a short film on the New Zealand chemist and scientist Ernest Rutherford's life; Tāhere Tikitiki - The Making of a Māori Canoe - a film following master carver Piri Poutapu as he traditionally made a Maori waka for the Maori Queen Te Arikinui Dame Te Atairangikaahu; The Truth about Tangiwai (2002) - an assessment of the railway disaster; and Mystery at Midge Bay, which assessed potential Portuguese and Spanish voyages to New Zealand pre Tasman.

Other films included A Sense of Involvement (1977); Jack Winter's Dream (1979); Painting in an Empty Land (1981); and Destinations (1988). An overview of his work can be seen on the NZ on Screen website.

Sims received a number of awards for his work, including for Rutherford of Nelson in 1972.
