= Philip Trusttum =

New Zealand artist (1940–2026)

Philip Trusttum ONZM
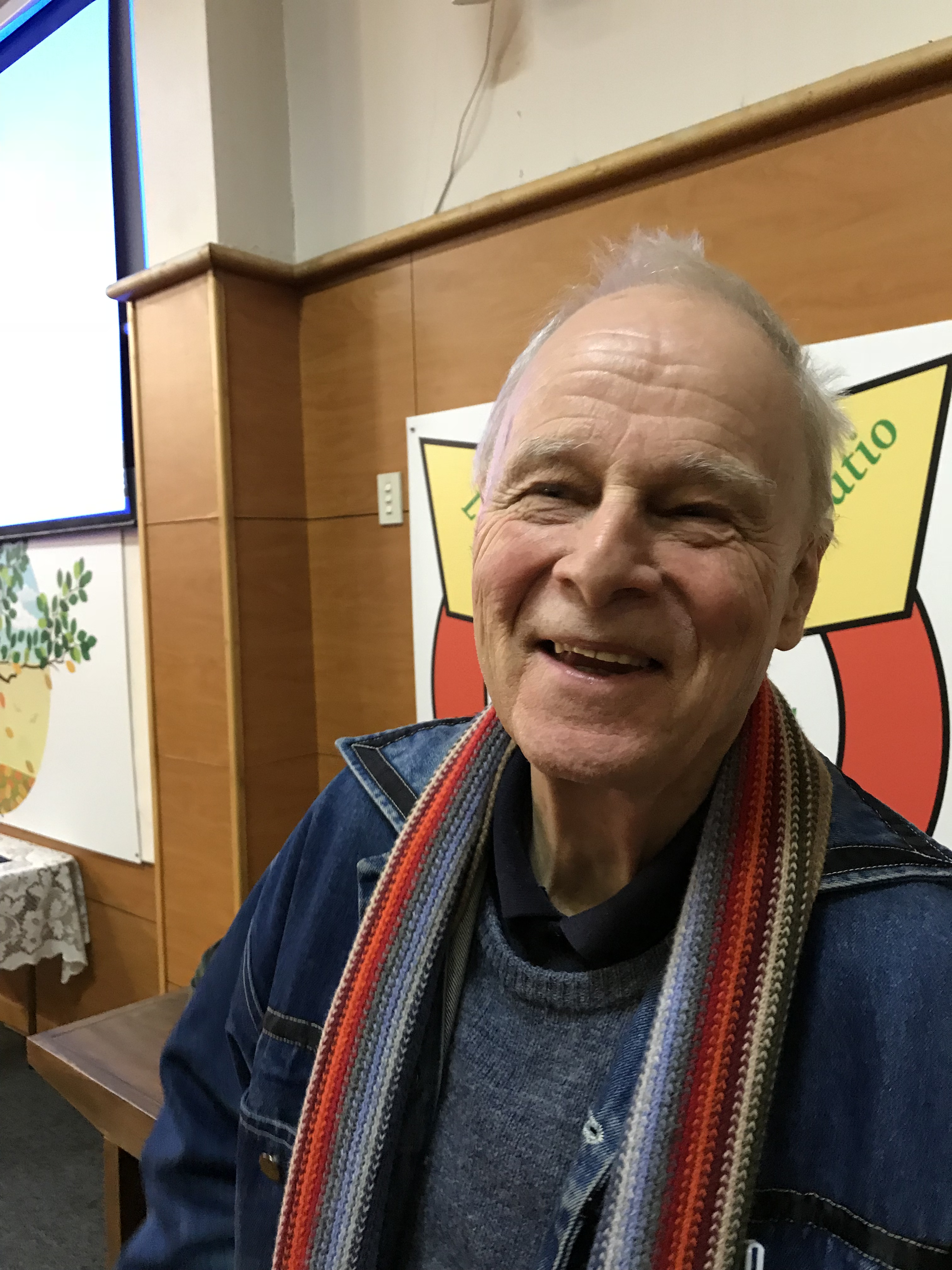
- Trusttum in 2018
- Born: 9 June 1940; Raetihi, New Zealand
- Died: 4 March 2026 (aged 85); Christchurch, New Zealand
- Education: University of Canterbury School of Fine Arts
- Website: www.trusttum.co.nz

Philip Spencer Trusttum ONZM (/ˈtrʌstəm/ TRUST-um; 9 June 1940 – 4 March 2026) was a New Zealand figurative expressionist artist. His works were usually large-scale, energetic, and colourful on unstretched canvas.

== Life and career ==
Trusttum was born in Raetihi, in the central North Island, on 9 June 1940 to William and Katherine Trusttum. His father was a Methodist lay preacher, but he became disillusioned with his religious work and in 1945 the Trusttum family left for Christchurch, where Philip attended Waimairi School. The family moved to Oxford in 1948, and again to Rangiora in 1955 and to nearby Ashley in 1957.

Trusttum's interest in art was kindled in Oxford, but did not seriously study the subject until he was 20, at which time he was accepted into the University of Canterbury School of Fine Arts. Here, he was taught by Rudolf Gopas, who was to prove a strong influence on the young artist, and through him became interested in expressionism. He also became a member of The Group, an influential group of Canterbury artists whose members included Colin McCahon, Toss Woollaston, and Doris Lusk. Trusttum graduated with a Diploma in Fine Arts in 1965.

In 1967, Trusttum was awarded a Queen Elizabeth II Arts Council scholarship for travel to develop his practice, though his initial overseas trip, to Australia, was met with disaster when many of his finished canvases were damaged in transit. Subsequently, his travels took him to North America and Europe.

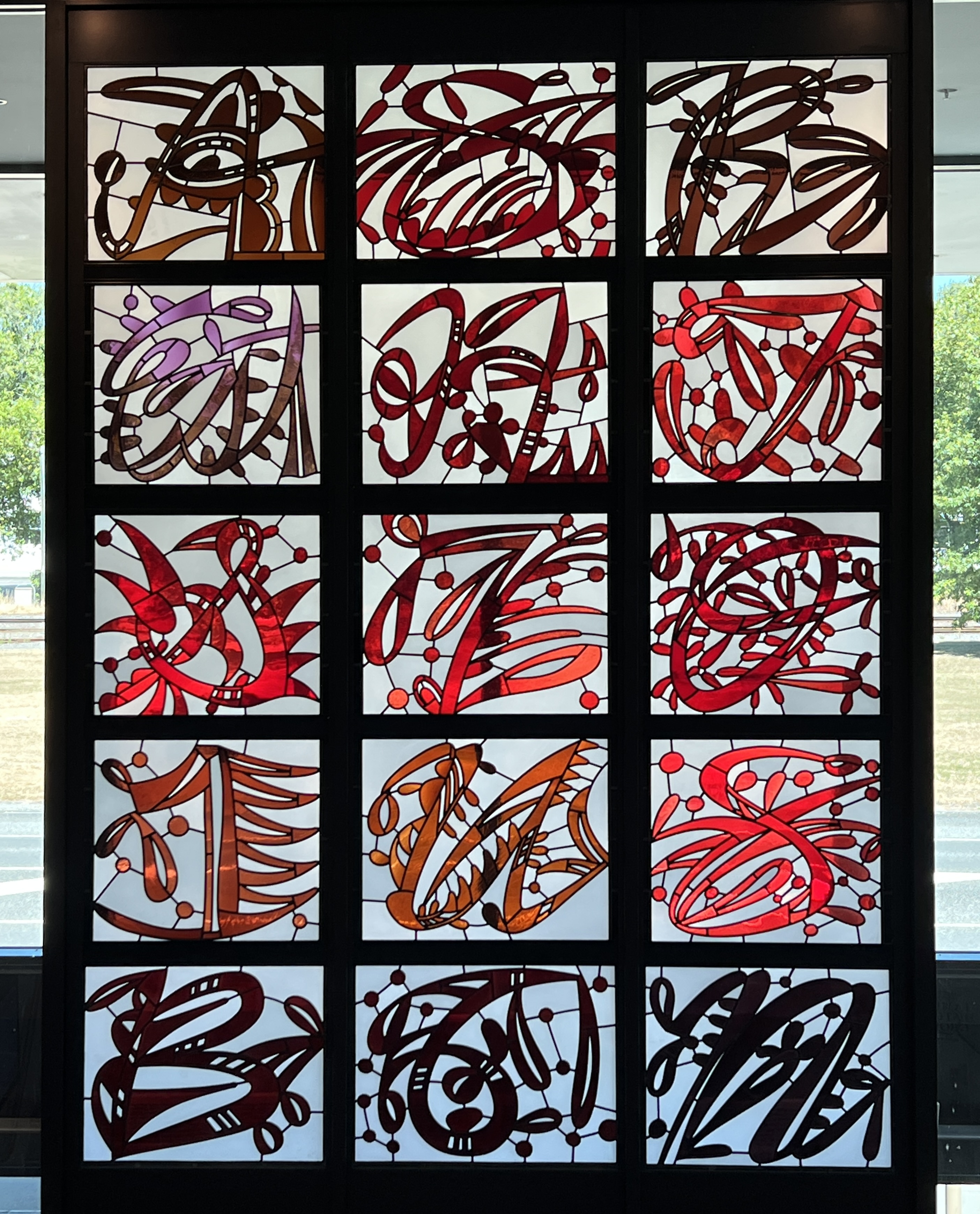
2001 stained glass window by Trusttum in the Ashburton Art Gallery and Heritage Centre atrium

From the early 1970s, Trusttum's work was largely inspired by everyday life experiences often worked into a semi-abstract form. His subject matter has ranged from house renovation to tennis, horses to Japanese masks. In 1984, Trusttum participated in ANZART at the Edinburgh Arts Festival. He exhibited in Sydney, New York, and Melbourne, as well as in all New Zealand's main centres. In 2000, he became the second New Zealand artist to be awarded the Pollock Krasner Foundation grant.

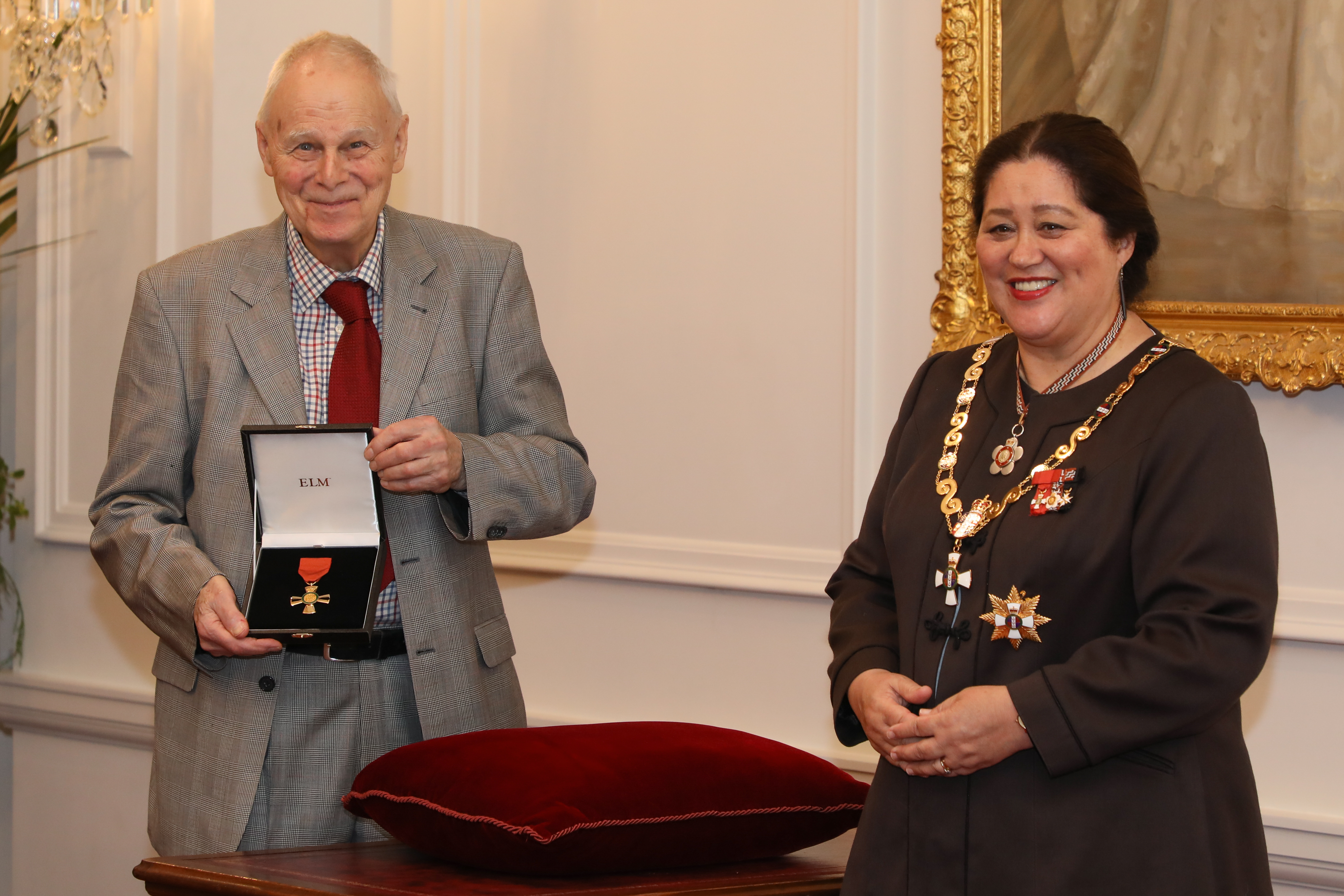
Trusttum (left), after his investiture as an Officer of the New Zealand Order of Merit by the governor-general, Dame Cindy Kiro, at Government House, Wellington, in 2021

In the 2021 Queen's Birthday Honours, Trusttum was appointed an Officer of the New Zealand Order of Merit, for services to art.

Trusttum died in Christchurch on 4 March 2026, at the age of 85.
