= Philip Clairmont =

New Zealand artist

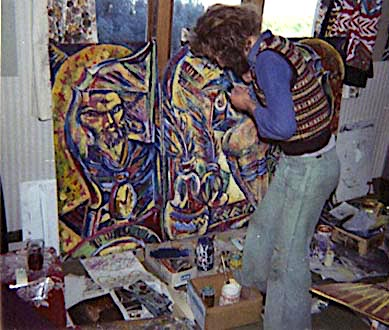
- Philip Clairmont in his Waikanae studio, 1975
- Born: Philip Anthony Clairmont; 1949; Nelson, New Zealand
- Died: 1984 (aged 34–35); Auckland, New Zealand
- Education: Canterbury School of Fine Arts
- Known for: Painting
- Movement: Expressionism

Philip Anthony Clairmont (1949–1984) was a New Zealand painter.

== Biography ==
Clairmont was born to Thelma and Rex Haines on 15 September 1949 in Nelson and named Philip Rex Haines. After his parents separated, his mother changed the family name in 1967 and he became Philip Anthony Clairmont. He attended Nelson College from 1963 to 1966. He studied in Christchurch under artists Rudolf Gopas and Doris Lusk, graduating from the Canterbury School of Fine Arts in 1970.

In 1969 he married Viki Hansen, in a wedding filmed by a local television station as an example of a 'hippie wedding', and their daughter Melissa was born the same year.

In 1973 he received a Queen Elizabeth II Arts Council grant and the family moved to Waikanae north of Wellington and four years later to 39 Roy Street in Wellington. Clairmont's final move was to Auckland in 1977. In 1979 he had another child, this time with his partner Rachel Power, a son named Orlando.

Clairmont's work was informed by the works of Vincent van Gogh and Francis Bacon, and was also influenced by his close relationship with fellow New Zealand artists Tony Fomison and Allen Maddox. His work is usually classed as expressionist or neo-expressionist because of the use of strong colours and distorted forms, often with domestic interiors as subject matter. His early work tends to be focussed and detailed. During his final decade his work had a tendency to become looser and less intense.

Clairmont epitomised the stereotypical bohemian artist lifestyle and felt himself that this form of life was necessary for him to regard himself as an authentic artist. Clairmont and Hansen divorced in 1983, and argued over matrimonial property. Police were called after an incident and Clairmont was arrested. He committed suicide three days later in Auckland in 1984, at the age of 34.

== Exhibitions ==
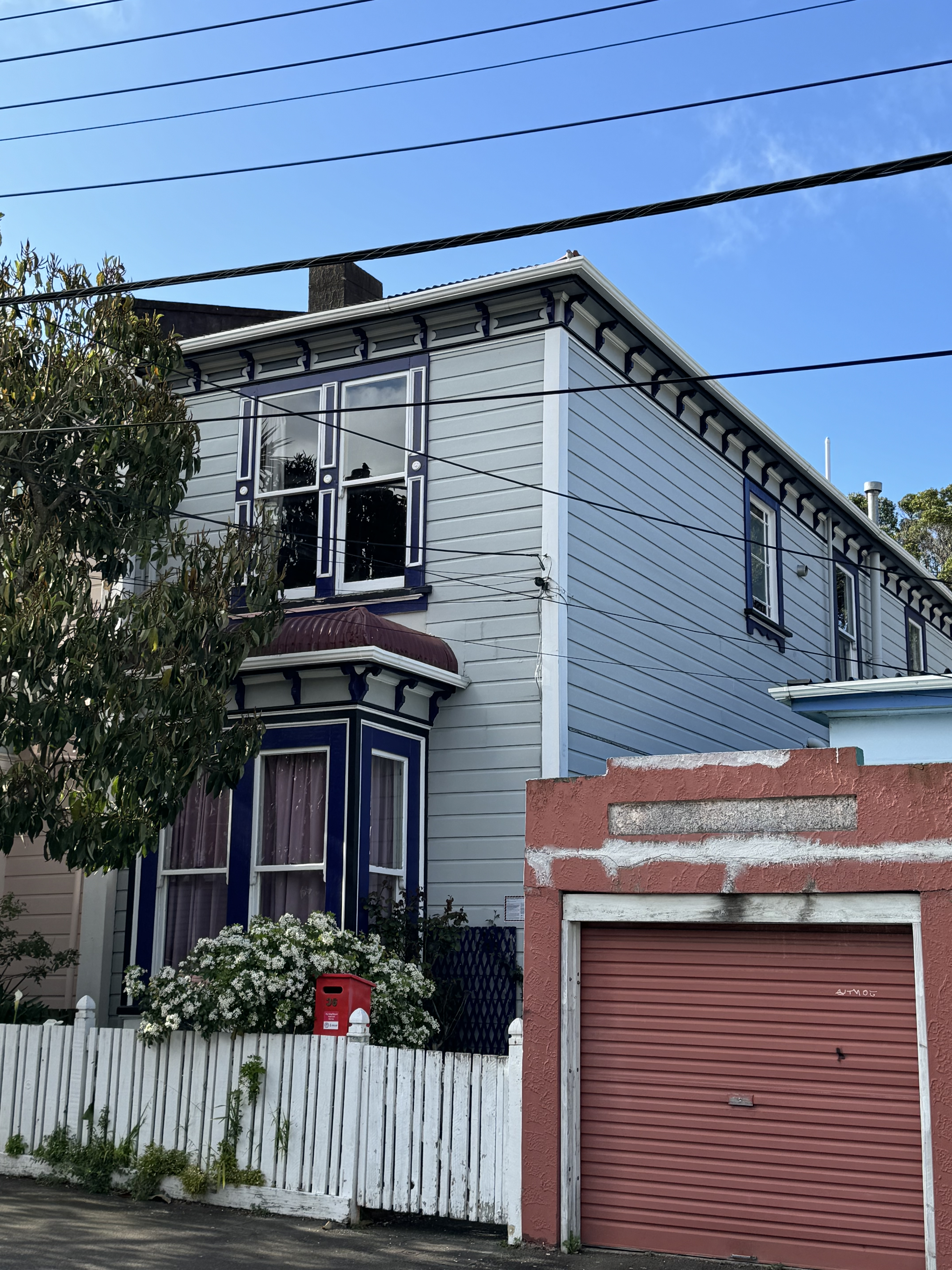
36 Roy Street, 2024

In total Clairmont had 26 solo exhibitions. The first was at Several Arts in Christchurch in 1970 while still at art school. In 1972 Clairmont was invited to join The Group and exhibited Fireplace, part of a large mural painted for the Christchurch nightclub 5 Jellies in 1971. When the club burnt down the painting had been rescued and later cut into three panels Fireplace, Lampshade and Couch, Chair and Ashtray. Clairmont showed with The Group on a number of occasions and in 1977 he sent Staircase Triptych 36 Roy Street painted in his Wellington home and studio to include in the final Group Show, The Group & the Last.

From 1972 on Clairmont was represented by dealer galleries in Christchurch, Wellington and Auckland including Bett-Duncan Gallery, New Vision Gallery and later Peter Webb Galleries, Denis Cohn Gallery and Auckland's Closet Artists Gallery. In the early seventies he exhibited many of his works in series, in particular Mirrors in 1974 and Wardrobes in 1976.

Clairmont was also admired for his drawing and print-making abilities and most exhibitions included prints and drawings included. At the beginning of Part 2 of Bruce Morrison's film referenced below you can see Clairmont inking and pulling a print of Large Still Life with Objects.

In 1984, shortly after his death, Clairmont featured in the exhibition Anxious Images: Aspects of New Zealand Art curated by Alexa Johnson for the Auckland City Art Gallery. In 1987, a survey show of Clairmont's work was organised by the Sarjeant Gallery in Whanganui and toured New Zealand.

== Selected works ==
- Lampshade 1971 view
- Portrait of a Washbasin, Blood in a Washbasin 1971 view
- Fireplace 1972 view
- Self Portrait 1975 view
- Staircase Triptych 36 Roy Street 1977 view
- The scarred couch: the Auckland experience 1978 view
- Bending Female Figure, Washbasin and Mirror 1980 view

== Archive media ==
In 1981 TVNZ made a two-part documentary profiling Clairmont. Director Bruce Morrison filmed Clairmont in his Mount Eden residence in Auckland. This documentary is freely available to view online.

The Cultural Icons series includes a video interview by Hamish Keith of Martin Edmond, Clairmont's biographer. It can be viewed online.
