= Theo Schoon =

New Zealand artist (1915–1985)

Theodorus Johannes Schoon
- Theo Schoon self-portrait
- Born: 31 July 1915; Kebumen Regency, Dutch East Indies
- Died: 14 July 1985 (aged 69); Sydney, Australia
- Occupation: Photographer

Theodorus Johannes Schoon (31 July 1915 – 14 July 1985) was a Dutch-born New Zealand artist, photographer and carver.

== Biography ==
Theo Schoon was born at Kebumen, Java in the East Indies, the son of Dutch parents, Johannes Theodorus Schoon and his wife Barbara Isabella Maria Steegemans. Theo lived in Java with his parents and brother before being sent to the Netherlands for his education. He attended the Rotterdam Academy of Fine Arts and also travelled widely in Europe. In 1936 he returned to Java and set up an art studio. In 1939, with the war looming, he and his parents emigrated to New Zealand.

While his art school training was conservative, Schoon knew about the Bauhaus, a German art and design school that revolutionised twentieth-century art. The Bauhaus taught that divisions between art and craft were illusory, and both were equally valid artistic expressions. This idea influenced Schoon for his whole artistic life and gave him the freedom to experiment in many media including drawing, printmaking, painting, wood carving, potting, stone carving, jewellery-making and photography.

While Schoon was mostly unimpressed with the local art scene in New Zealand he did briefly attend the Canterbury University College Ilam School of Fine Arts before moving to Wellington in 1941. While in Wellington he came in contact with artists whose work he approved of and influenced including Rita Angus – for whom he was one of the main sources of her interest in Buddhist art and culture; Gordon Walters – with whom he shared his interest in non-figurative painting; Dennis Knight Turner; and A. R. D. Fairburn. His portrait was painted by Rita Angus and Douglas MacDiarmid.

Schoon was very interested in Māori art. From the mid-1940s He studied the early Māori rock drawings in Canterbury caves and was employed by the Department of Internal Affairs to record the drawings from 1945 to 1948. On several of his trips to these caves he was accompanied by friend John Money, who was later to become a major patron of both Schoon and Angus.

He moved to Auckland in 1949 and stayed with A. R. D. Fairburn before moving on to Rotorua in 1950 where he began a series of photographic studies of mudpools and silica formations around Rotorua and Taupo. He returned to Auckland in 1952 and shifted his artistic focus to Maori designs in Tā moko (facial tattooing), carved gourds, and kowhaiwhai (rafters of meeting houses). In the same year, he joined the Mt Albert Plant Research Station, where he met photographer Steve Rumsey, who assisted Schoon in developing photographs for an exhibition at the Auckland Art Gallery, which was never held. He began to grow and carve his own gourds in 1956–57. He moved to the East Coast in 1961 to study traditional carving techniques with the Maori carver Pine Taiapa and was encouraged to publish an article on growing gourds in the Maori magazine Te Ao Hou in 1962 to accompany an article on carved gourds. In 1963 his gourds were the only artwork by a Pakeha (non-Maori) featured in an exhibition of Maori art held at Turangawaewae marae, Ngāruawāhia. Most of Schoon's gourds were sold to tourists and only a few remain in New Zealand today.

Martin Rumsby was with Schoon during some of his explorations in the Waiotapu geothermal area when it was not as well known, writing: "Theo told me that nature worked in repeating cycles – that was his theory. So, if he wanted a particular design in the mud pools, for example, then he would wait and count them out. That is, a particular form may appear with every seventh 'plop' so, once he had seen it he would count out how many formations it would take to reappear then photograph it."

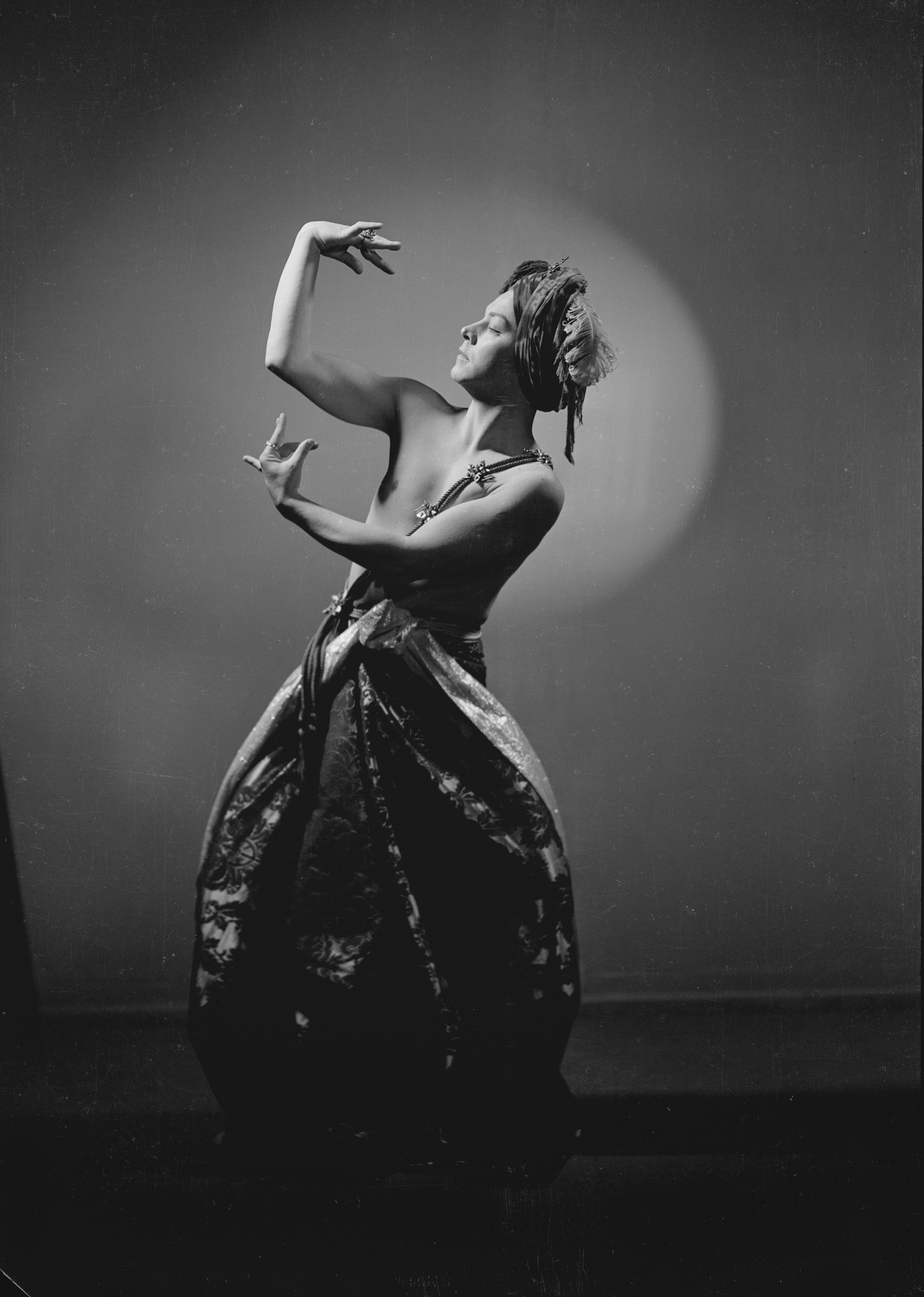
Schoon posing in Balinese costume in 1943. Photo by Spencer Digby Studios.

After moving back to Auckland in 1956 Schoon continued his work until he left Auckland for Rotorua in late 1965 to return to photographing mud pools and other geothermic activity. He switched artistic focus again in 1968 when he began to carve greenstone (pounamu or New Zealand jade). He moved to the West Coast of New Zealand – the source of the stone – and was employed by the Westland Greenstone Company in Hokitika in 1970. He did some major research into jade carving at this time including a trip to Hong Kong but was dismissed from his employment in 1971. He moved to Sydney in 1972 where he completed a book on jade carving called Jade Country, published 1973.

Throughout his life he took numerous jobs to make ends meet while he pursued his art including working as a nurse at Auckland Mental Hospital in Avondale in 1949 and as a farm worker at the Mt Albert Plant Research Station in 1952. He often relied on the generosity of friends for accommodation and support. He was a flamboyant man and a homosexual. His upbringing in the East Indies continued to influence him throughout his life. He enjoyed dressing up in Balinese clothing and had studied Javanese dance. He was photographed in later life still able to demonstrate the lotus position and the intricate hand movements.

He returned to New Zealand in 1982 but went back to Sydney in 1985 where he died on 14 July aged 69. His extensive archive including sketch books, photographic negatives and correspondence was purchased by the Museum of New Zealand Te Papa Tongarewa. A further major collection of his work is part of the John Money Collection at Eastern Southland Gallery in Gore, New Zealand.

== Artistry ==
Schoon's work was multidisciplinary, often focusing on abstract forms, surreal landscape photography and minuscule worlds.

== Exhibitions ==
- 1963: Turangawaewae marae, Group Exhibition
- 1965: New Vision Gallery Solo Exhibition
- 2008: Te Papa, Theo Schoon: Opening the Archive
- 2015: Bowerbank Ninow, Theo Schoon

== List of works ==
- Works in the collection of the Museum of New Zealand Te Papa Tongarewa
