= Barry Cleavin =

New Zealand artist (1939–2026)

Barry Cleavin ONZM
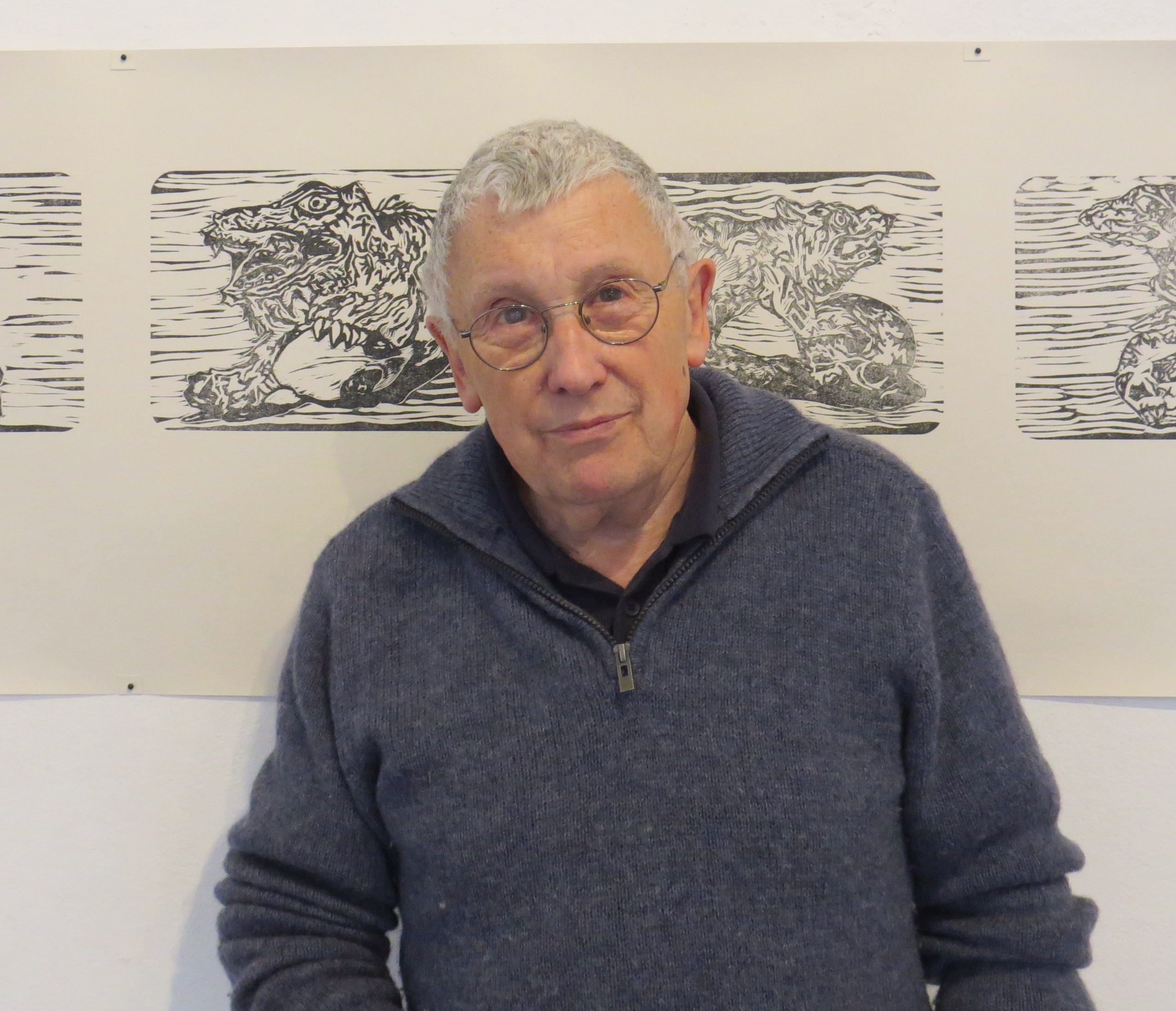
- Cleavin, with some of his artwork, in Dunedin, November 2019
- Born: Barry Vickerman Cleavin; 18 December 1939; Dunedin, New Zealand
- Died: 1 September 2026 (aged 86)
- Known for: Printmaking

Barry Vickerman Cleavin (18 December 1939 – 1 September 2026) was a New Zealand fine art printmaker.

== Life and career ==
Cleavin was born in Dunedin on 18 December 1939. He was educated King's High School from 1953 to 1958. He moved to Christchurch in 1963, and studied at the University of Canterbury, where his lecturers included Rudi Gopas and Bill Sutton. He completed a Diploma of Fine Arts (Hons) in 1966.

He continued his education in Hawaii at the Honolulu Academy of Arts, before returning to the University of Canterbury where he was senior lecturer in printmaking from 1978 to 1990. Cleavin returned to Dunedin following the 2011 Christchurch earthquake, where he set up his studio on Otago Peninsula.

Cleavin died on 1 September 2026, at the age of 86.

== Work ==
A major exhibition of Cleavin's work, which was curated by the Auckland City Art Gallery, toured New Zealand in 1982. The exhibition was called "Ewe & Eye".

Cleavin's work was long concentrated on etching, but in later years also included digital printmaking. His works are hallmarked by a wry surrealism and punning titles, using recurring motifs of animal skeletons, silhouetted horsemen, and shadow patterns. Many of his images make poignant political comments. These themes combined in the 1988 book A Series of Allegations or Taking Allegations Seriously, co-written with A. K. Grant and published by Hazard Press. In 2013, Melinda Johnston wrote Lateral Inversions: The prints of Barry Cleavin. This book surveys the majority of his work including prints and drawings from 1966 through until 2012.

His work is held in many public art galleries in New Zealand including the Christchurch Art Gallery (where he had a major exhibition called "The Elements of Doubt" in 1997) Auckland Art Gallery The Govett-Brewster Art Gallery, Te Papa, and the Suter Art Gallery where he had an exhibit called "The Exact Enigma" in 2015.

=== 36 Views of Hereweka ===
Cleavin first exhibited his 36 limited edition digital prints in 2016 at the Brett McDowell Gallery in Dunedin. The process in making these was not straightforward. Starting from a sketch or a photo, they involve computer manipulation and artistry to create a print that looks like it was originally hand-painted. They were then exhibited in Christchurch at the Chambers Art Gallery in a show called "Wintering Over" in 2017. These can be seen as a homage to Hokusai and Hiroshige, the Japanese woodblock masters of the ukiyo-e. In place of Mount Fuji, Cleavin incorporates Hereweka (Harbour Cone) into each print. A complete set of these is held in the Suter Gallery in Nelson. It was a gift of John and Ann Hercus.

== Honours and awards ==
Cleavin received numerous awards for his art, notably becoming the Fulbright Fellow at The Tamarind Institute of Lithography, Albuquerque, in 1983. He received an honorary Doctor of Letters degree from the University of Canterbury in 2005. In making the award, the University of Canterbury noted that Cleavin "is one of the country’s most inventive, forceful and prodigious artists, combining meticulous skills as a draughtsman and intaglio printmaker with an imagination that embraces a wide range of subject matter. He believes art should be readily accessible to all at a reasonable price and not be the preserve of the affluent."

In the 2001 New Year Honours, Cleavin was appointed an Officer of the New Zealand Order of Merit, for services to the arts. He represented New Zealand at various international print biennales, in Berlin, Krakow, Ljubljana, Paris, Sapporo, San Francisco, and Tokyo.
