= Tony Fomison =

New Zealand artist (1939–1990)

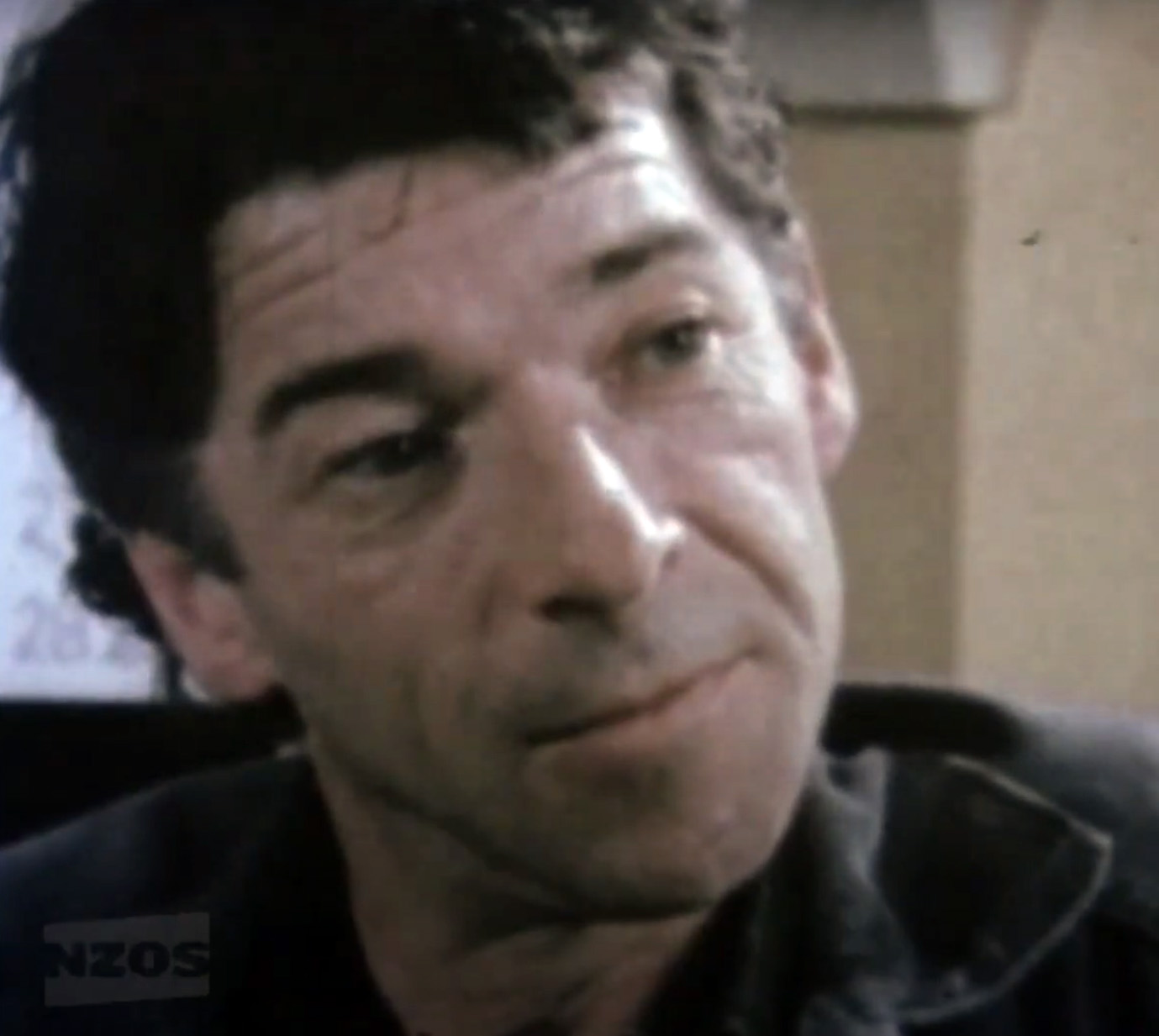
- Fomison, 1981
- Born: 12 July 1939; Christchurch
- Died: 7 February 1990 (aged 50); Whangārei

Anthony Leslie (Tony) Fomison (12 July 1939 – 7 February 1990) was a notable artist in New Zealand. He was an important post-war visual artist in the country and influenced New Zealand art by incorporating elements of narrative and myth into contemporary art.

== Background ==
Fomison was born in Christchurch and studied at Linwood High School. He studied sculpture at the School of Fine Arts at Canterbury University, where he was taught by Rudi Gopas, and during these early years he continued an interest in archaeology which had begun in high school. He also compiled photographic essays during this period. Fomison began painting in earnest in 1960–61. In 1964, he travelled to England and Spain and lived in the former for three years before returning to Christchurch in 1967. During his time in England, he was hospitalised at Banstead Hospital after succumbing to drug addiction. After his return from Europe and the UK Fomison painted a series of work based on paintings and images he had seen on his travels. Many of these works, painted on hessian, were completed over several years. Typical is his Study of Holbein's ' Dead Christ’ 1971–73 based on the Holbein original The Body of the Dead Christ in the Tomb in the collection of the Kunstmuseum in Basel.

== Study of Māori cave drawings ==
After graduating from art school Fomison went to work as an archaeological assistant at the Canterbury Museum then under the directorship of Roger Duff. Fomison took part in a major survey of Māori rock art in South Canterbury and contributed to the archive with drawings, notes and tracings recording over 300 sites. A photo of Fomison in 1969 standing next to one of his cave drawing tracings is held in the Christchurch Star archives. The same year Fomison used the rock drawings as an inspiration for his cover illustration for the literary magazine Landfall. In different colour mixes it was used for the four copies of the magazine published that year.

== Exhibitions ==
Tony Fomison in his Auckland studio, 1978

Like his friend Philip Clairmont Tony Fomison had his first solo exhibition at Several Arts in Christchurch. Over his career he had 39 solo exhibitions including two touring survey exhibitions in1979, the Dowse Art Gallery’s Tony Fomison: a Survey of his Painting and Drawing from 1961 to 1979 and in 1994 City Gallery Wellington's exhibition Fomison: What Shall we Tell Them?.

== Connections with Polynesian culture ==
Fomison moved to Auckland, the largest Polynesian city in the world, in 1973. From that time, his work was influenced by Polynesian culture, including attempts to help revive the skill of traditional Tā moko tattooing. At around this time he met fellow artist Colin McCahon, with whom he struck up a long close friendship.

Fomison was tattooed by Samoan master tattooist Sua Sulu'ape Paulo II with a pe'a, the traditional male tattoo of Samoa. Only a few Europeans have received the traditional Samoan tattoo.

His largest work, The Ponsonby Madonna, was commissioned by the Trustees of St Paul's College in Ponsonby in 1982. By 2007 high insurance costs meant the mural had to be sold and is now in the collection of the Auckland Art Gallery. A life-size reproduction of the work was installed in the chapel at St Paul's College in 2022.

== Prizes and awards ==
1963 Awarded an Arts Advisory Board grant to travel to England and Europe.

1985 Fomison was the inaugural recipient of the Rita Angus Residency. Media reports from the time state that he intended to spend his time in Wellington on the residency developing his contacts with the local Samoan community.

== Death ==
Fomison died in Whangārei having spent the day at Waitangi during the commemorations of the 150th anniversary of the signing of New Zealand's founding document, the Treaty of Waitangi.

== Art Market ==
In 2022, Fomison's painting The Fugitive sold for $1.8 million (NZ) dollars. (Webb's Auctions)
