= Len Castle =

New Zealand potter (1924–2011)

Len Castle DCNZM CBE
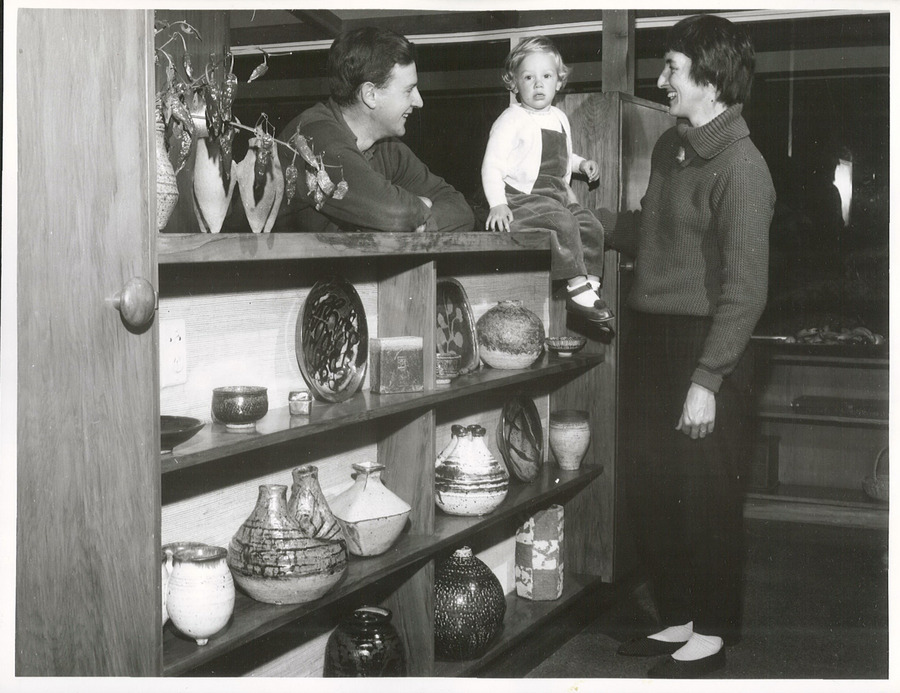
- Castle and his family at home in Titirangi (1973)
- Born: Leonard Ramsay Castle; 23 December 1924; Auckland, New Zealand
- Died: 29 September 2011 (aged 86)
- Education: Mount Albert Grammar School
- Alma mater: Auckland University College
- Known for: Pottery

Leonard Ramsay Castle DCNZM CBE (23 December 1924 – 29 September 2011) was a New Zealand potter.

== Early life and family ==
Born in Auckland on 23 December 1924, Castle was educated at Mount Albert Grammar School. He went on to study at Auckland University College, graduating Bachelor of Science in 1947, and trained as a secondary school teacher at Auckland Teachers' Training College. After a period as a science teacher at Mount Albert Grammar School, he took a lecturing position at Auckland Teachers' College.

In 1959, Castle married Ruth Main. The couple had one child, but later divorced.

== Pottery ==
Castle's first experience of pottery was as a 10-year-old, seeing Olive Jones demonstrating at the Auckland Easter Show. Castle began making his first pottery in 1947 and took night classes with Robert Nettleton Field at Avondale College, Auckland. In 1956, he moved to St Ives, Cornwall for a year to work with Bernard Leach and became a full-time potter in 1963. The same year he helped establish the New Zealand Society of Potters.

In the early 1950s, Castle met Theo Schoon and Schoon decorated the surfaces of pots thrown and fired by Castle. In the 1960s Schoon introduced him to the geothermal areas of the central North Island of New Zealand. Castle has continued to photograph this landscape area, which is also reflected in his pottery.

In the early 1960s, Castle had an architecturally designed house built in the bush of the Waitākere Ranges at 20 Tawini Road, Titirangi, with a kiln and rail system out the back, and a low basement which allowed pottery to be exhibited. The Boyes family, which bought the house, demolished the kiln; however, the bricks from it form the paving round the lower part of the house, and shards from discarded pottery works can still be found amongst the clay soil of the bush behind.

Castle studied pottery in Japan, Korea and China in 1966–67. He named Shoji Hamada as one of his influences. Castle built a new house in South Titirangi with a larger kiln and even more extensive railway to serve it in 1972–73, which is still operating. In 1989, along with a number of other New Zealand ceramic and glass artists, he was commissioned to supply work for the exhibition Treasures of the Underworld for the New Zealand pavilion at the World Expo at Seville in 1991. This work is now in the collection of the Museum of New Zealand Te Papa Tongarewa.

Castle died on 29 September 2011, and was cremated at the Purewa Crematorium.

== Honours and awards ==
In the 1986 Queen's Birthday Honours, Castle was appointed a Commander of the Order of the British Empire, for services to pottery. Four years later, he was awarded the New Zealand 1990 Commemoration Medal. Castle was appointed as a Distinguished Companion of the New Zealand Order of Merit in the 2004 New Year Honours, for services to pottery. In 2009, he declined redesignation as a Knight Companion when the New Zealand government restored titular honours.

In 2003, Castle received an Icon award from the New Zealand Arts Foundation.

The book Len Castle: Potter, published by Ron Sang Publishing, won a 2003 Montana New Zealand Book Award for non-fiction. Six years later, Lopdell House Gallery's Making the Molecules Dance won the Montana New Zealand Book Award for best illustrative non-fiction.

== Works ==
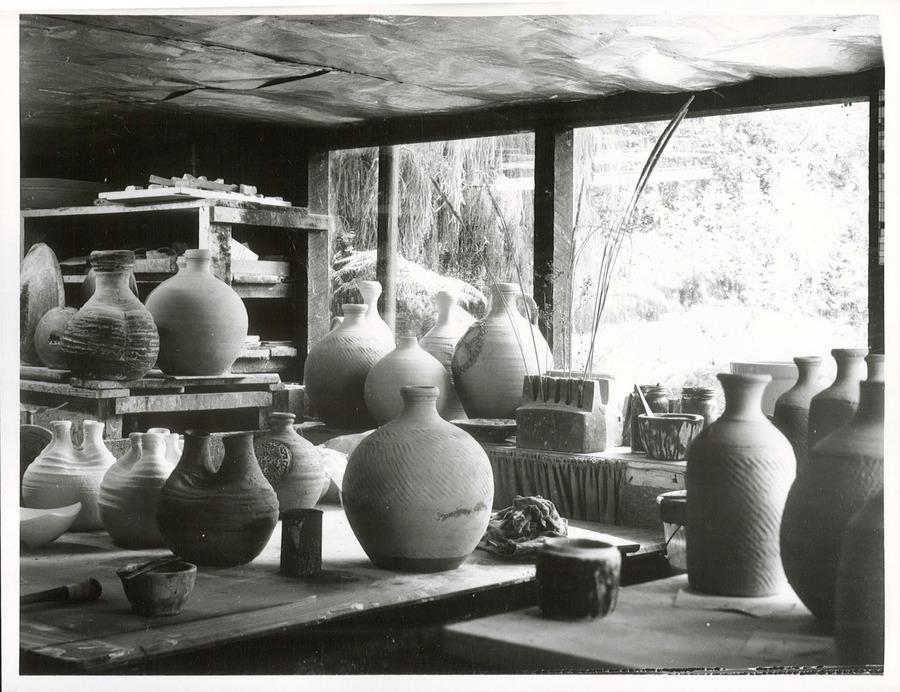
The workshop of Len Castle, of Titirangi, Auckland, showing some of his distinctive pots

- Works in the collection of the Museum of New Zealand Te Papa Tongarewa
