= Quentin Macfarlane =

New Zealand painter (1935–2019)

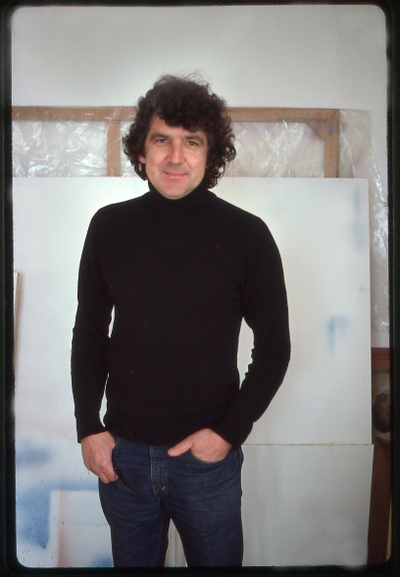
- Macfarlane in his Christchurch studio, 1978
- Born: Quentin Manners Macfarlane; 12 September 1935; Dunedin
- Died: 5 July 2019 (aged 83); Auckland
- Education: Diploma of Fine Arts with honours
- Alma mater: School of Fine Arts University of Canterbury
- Known for: Marine landscapes
- Style: Abstract

Quentin Manners Macfarlane (12 September 1935 – 5 July 2019) was a New Zealand artist known for his abstract marine paintings.

== Early life and art career ==
Macfarlane was born on 12 September 1935 in Dunedin. His mother, Tui (née Northey), was an artist. He went to school at Hutt Valley High just outside of Wellington where he was taught by James Coe. A fellow student was Bill Culbert who also went on to become a significant artist. Macfarlane studied at the School of Fine Arts at the University of Canterbury from 1954 to 1957 and graduated with honours in painting in 1958. His fellow students included John Coley, Ted Bracey, Pat Hanly, Hamish Keith, Trevor Moffitt, Ted Bullmore, Gil Taverner (Hanly) and Bill Culbert. The teaching staff included Bill Sutton, Russell Clark and Colin Lovell-Smith. After graduating Macfarlane attended the Post-Primary Teachers' Training College in Ardmore and received a diploma of teaching. He went on to teach in a number of secondary schools including Lincoln and Cashmere High Schools. From 1959, Macfarlane had become a regular contributor to group shows in Christchurch and Auckland and was selected by Auckland City Art Gallery's director Peter Tomory for a number of touring exhibitions. In the same year he married Judith Gifford who went on to direct the Brooke Gifford Gallery with Barbara Brooke. In 1962, while teaching at Cashmere High School, Macfarlane organised an exhibition at the school of twelve works by Colin McCahon selected from the collections of his friends. This exhibition was in response to the uproar that had followed McCahon being announced joint winner of the Hay's Limited Art Competition. McCahon later referred to the Macfarlane-curated show as "my first retrospective". In his own painting practice Macfarlane was an early adopter of acrylic paint. Although in use for house painting in the mid-1950s, the first use of them by an artist recorded in New Zealand was in works by Macfarlane. The catalogue for the exhibition Contemporary New Zealand Painting and Sculpture 1962 noted the medium of Macfarlane's three paintings as p.v.a.. Macfarlane continued to be an ardent supporter of the medium and years later continued to hand out extracts copied from Lawrence Jensen's book Synthetic Painting Media published by Prentice Hall in 1964. In 1964 Macfarlane was appointed as a lecturer at the Christchurch Teachers' Training College.

=== 20/20 Vision ===
1964 also saw the formation of 20/20 Vision, a loose grouping of Canterbury artists set up by artist John Coley and art school lecturer Tom Taylor. The group intended to liven up the art scene through exhibitions, demonstrations and talks around current exhibitions on show in the city alongside general hilarity such as the founding in 1966 of the 20/20 Vision Decimal Milk Token Advisory Commission. Macfarlane was an active member and wrote about the group in the magazine Ascent. 20/20 Vision went on, in 1968, to set up an exhibition in Dominion Motors on Armagh Street and the Northlands Shopping Centre in Papanui selling commercially produced prints for $2.00 each as a commentary on both the conventional nature of current print making and the art market in general.

=== Painting career ===
In 1975 Macfarlane began part-time teaching at his old art school at Canterbury University and become involved with his wife Judith Gifford's new venture the Brooke Gifford Gallery. Apart from some part-time teaching requirements, by 1975 Macfarlane was virtually painting full-time with a reputation as one of the country's leading marine painters. A good early example of this style can be seen here in the collection of the Auckland Art Gallery. In a review of Macfarlane's work in Ascent, Leo Bensemann described the "powerful rolling sweep and sense of distant loneliness ..." in the work pointing out how they "claim attention for the seas and coast around us". Serving as a regular crew member for publisher Albion Wright's yacht Pastime, alongside architect Peter Beaven, he took part in many sailing trips around Banks Peninsula drawing inspiration for his work. Friend and art writer John Coley located the marine influence in Macfarlane's work closer to home in the suburb he had lived in since the mid-1960s. "Quentin Macfarlane's paintings have always related to his local environment, specifically the seascape below his Clifton Hill home at Sumner." In 1989 Macfarlane said of these works "I'm typecast now as a marine painter. That doesn't worry me."

Macfarlane died in Auckland on 5 July 2019.

== Selected exhibitions ==
=== Solo ===
- 1959 Quentin Macfarlane Gallery 91
- 1963 Quentin Macfarlane Ikon Gallery. Macfarlane's first solo exhibition outside Christchurch.
- 1966 Quentin Macfarlane: Paintings and Drawings Little Woodware Shop, Christchurch.
- 1969 Quentin Macfarlane Barry Lett Galleries.
- 1971 Rue Pompallier Gallery Akaroa. Marine paintings.
- 1972 Quentin Macfarlane (solo) Canterbury Society of Arts.
- 1975 Quentin Macfarlane (solo) Barry Lett Galleries.
- 1984 Robert McDougall Art Gallery (solo) Art writer Evan Webb noted, “MacFarlane's extensive range of painterly skills” “The reference to landscape was still very evident as were the familiar blues and greens of MacFarlane's painting but in some works the strict horizontal composition – the measured bands of colour have given way to more intuitive arrangements.“ And from critic John Hurrell in the Christchurch Press, “well designed and meticulously executed works have conveyed a delight in colour combined with a restrained measuring out of space…”
- 1988 Paintings on Paper (solo) Brooke Gifford Gallery.

=== Group ===
- 1959–1977 The Group
- 1960 Hay's Limited Art Competition. Macfarlane showed work in all of the Hay's exhibitions, 1962, 1963 and 1966.
- Four Canterbury Artists Auckland Art Gallery. The other artists were John Coley, Janet Kenny and Peter Tennant.
- 1961 Canterbury Society of Arts Annual Exhibition.
- 1962 Contemporary New Zealand Painting and Sculpture 1962 Auckland Art Gallery.
- 1963 Biennale de Paris.
- New Zealand Painting 1963 Auckland Art City Gallery. (toured) Tomory selection.
- 1966 20/20 Vision Barry Lett Galleries, Auckland. The other artists were John Coley, Michael Eaton, David Graham and Don Peebles.
- Hay's Limited Art Competition. Second prize.
- 1968 Ten Years of Painting in Auckland Auckland City Art Gallery.
- 1969 20/20 Vision Northlands Shopping Centre, Papanui Christchurch.
- 1970 Royal Visit Art Exhibition Robert McDougall Art Gallery.
- 1971 Recent Painting in Canterbury Robert McDougal Art Gallery.
- Manawatu Centennial Prize for Contemporary Art Manawatu Art Gallery (toured).
- 1972 Benson & Hedges Art Award Canterbury Society of Arts Gallery. Finalist.
- 1973 Eight Christchurch Artists Holdsworth Gallery, Sydney. Other artists included Barry Cleavin, John Coley, Philip Clairmont and Trevor Moffit.
- Canterbury Confrontations Canterbury Society of Arts. Macfarlane painted Bill Sutton who in turn drew pencil portraits of Macfarlane.
- 1974 1972 Benson & Hedges Art Award Canterbury Society of Arts Gallery. Finalist.
- Art N.Z.’74.
- 1978 Ted Bracey and Quentin Macfarlane Brooke Gifford Gallery, Christchurch.
- 1985 Big Paintings Canterbury Society of Arts Gallery.
- 1988 Quentin MacFarland and Joanna Braithwaite Brooke Gifford Gallery, Christchurch.
- 1989 14 Canterbury Artists Brooke Gifford Gallery Christchurch.

== Commissions and awards ==
1966 Awarded a Canterbury Society of Arts Guthrie Travel Grant for travel in Australia.

1972 invited to compete for mural in Hamilton Founders Memorial Theatre. The commission eventually given to Ralph Hotere.

1974 QEII Arts Council grant.

1980 Waimarie Council Art Award.

1982 Installs set of banners in the central light well of the new Canterbury Public Library on Gloucester Street. The works hangs through three floors, of the building. The library's architect Miles Warren of the architectural firm Warren and Mahoney said that Macfarlane's work would "give a brilliance and pattern to the library" and "guide people into the upper floors".

== Collections ==
- Auckland Art Gallery Toi Tāmaki
- Christchurch Art Gallery
- Dunedin Public Art Gallery
- Fletcher Trust Collection
- Te Manawa
- Te Papa Tongarewa
