= Brooke Gifford Gallery =

Art gallery in New Zealand, 1975 to 2011

Coordinates: 43.5350°S 172.6398°E

The Brooke Gifford Gallery was a dealer art gallery focusing on contemporary New Zealand art that opened in Christchurch, New Zealand, in 1975. It was run by Barbara Brooke and Judith Gifford and closed in 2011.

== Pre history ==
In January 1959, André and Barbara Brooke opened Gallery 91 in Cashel Street, Otautahi Christchurch. Although the gallery only survived for eleven months it presented significant solo exhibitions by Rudolf Gopas, Colin McCahon, Tosswill Woollaston, Doris Lusk, Helen Brown, Douglas McDiarmid, Frank Gross, John Coley, June Black, and Olivia Spencer Bower.

== History ==
In 1975 Brooke teamed up with Judith Gifford to open the Brooke Gifford Gallery. The Gallery was located at 112 Manchester Street in a space shared with an antiques store although in time the Gallery did get its own entrance. Brooke and Gifford were helped to prepare the spaces by Quentin MacFarlane who Gifford had married in 1959. Rodney Wilson, who was teaching art history at the University of Canterbury and went on to direct the Christchurch Art Gallery and Auckland Art Gallery, drew up the lighting plan and designer Max Hailstone created the Brook Gifford Gallery Logo.

The Brooke Gifford Gallery remained the city's only dealer gallery for contemporary art for many years. In 1980, five years after the gallery opened, Barbara Brooke died leaving Judith Gifford to run the space alone. The first exhibition was by the painter Tom Field who had won the Hays Art Competition in 1963. In July of that year the Gallery arranged with Barry Lett Galleries to show Auckland artists including Pat Hanly, Robert Ellis, Colin McCahon (Jump series works), Ralph Hotere, Carl Sydow, and Suzanne Goldberg. Other artists shown in the first year of the gallery included Don Binney, Ted Bracey, John Coley, Michael Illingworth, Quentin MacFarlane, Trevor Moffitt, Allan Pearson, Paree Romanides, Olivia Spencer-Bower, Karl Sydow, Tino Tibbo, and Charles Tole.

A comparison with the artists included in the Gallery's Thirtieth Anniversary show demonstrates the breadth of the roster over the years: Don Binney, Joanna Braithwaite, Shane Cotton, Maryrose Crook, Darryn George, Bill Hammond, Richard Killeen, Tony de la Tour, Quentin MacFarlane, Seraphine Pick, Peter Robinson, Ava Seymore, Terry Stringer, Grant Takle, and John Walsh. Art historian Petrena Fishburn notes the significance of the Brooke Gifford opening in Christchurch two years before the final exhibition of The Group. For many artists the new dealer gallery was a major opportunity to present solo exhibitions on an annual basis rather than being one among many in the large mixed Group exhibitions.

== Selected exhibitions ==
1978 House Alterations was Neil Dawson's first solo dealer gallery show. The exhibition presented a series of differing views of small houses. The critic Michael Thomas described two of them in his Art New Zealand review, 'Magnification for instance shows the middle part of a house enlarged to form a circular shape; and in another work entitled Enlargement a tiny wooden house about 1 cm in height stands supported only by a thin 'shadow' of wood in front of an enlarged version of the same building.

1979 With funding from the Queen Elizabeth II Arts Council the Gallery assembled an ambitious survey exhibition of the sculptor Bill Culbert. Bill Culbert: London and New Zealand Works toured to public art museums throughout New Zealand. In the same year, with the help of artists John Hurrell and Paul Johns, Billy Apple made alterations to the gallery's small print room in his installation Censure Realised: Brooke Gifford Gallery Christchurch.

This work was included many years later in De-Building, an exhibition that was showing at the Christchurch Art Gallery during the 2011 earthquake.

1982 Bill Hammond's first exhibition with the Brooke Gifford Gallery. Art writer and critic Hamish Keith recalled seeing the exhibition, "I walked into that show and I was completely blown away ...he just made things out of who we are and where he was. An extraordinary artist."

1985 To mark the tenth year of operation and marking the United Nations' Decade for Women, Gifford curated an exhibition of women artists: Gretchen Albrecht, Claudia Pond-Eyely, Maria Olsen, Philippa Blair, Julia Morison, Sylvia Siddell and Merylyn Tweedie.

== Closure ==
In 2011 an earthquake damaged much of central Christchurch and although the building in Manchester Street was salvageable, it was in a prohibited zone and could not be accessed. Eventually, with the help of her family, Gifford was able to enter the building and remove the art works stored there. For a time, again with the help of family members, Gifford continued operating the Gallery via a website and a space in Moorhouse Avenue where the gallery mounted an exhibition 36 years in the Zone. Artists included: Laurence Aberhart, Joanna Braithwaite, Shane Cotton, Tony de Lautour, Darryn George, Jason Greig, Bill Hammond, Richard Killeen and Séraphine Pick. The gallery finally closed the following year.

Judith Gifford died on 9 September 2021.
