= Bill Culbert =

New Zealand artist (1935–2019)

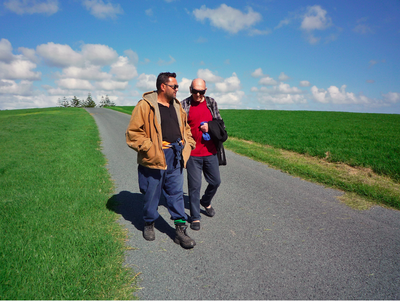
- Bill Culbert (right) and Michael Parekowhai at the Gibbs farm, 2012
- Born: William Franklin Culbert; 23 January 1935
- Died: 28 March 2019 (aged 84)
- Education: Ilam School of Fine Arts Canterbury University College
- Known for: Sculpture

William Franklin Culbert MNZM (23 January 1935 – 28 March 2019) was a New Zealand artist, notable for his use of light in painting, photography, sculpture and installation work, as well as his use of found and recycled materials.

He was born in Port Chalmers, near Dunedin, and divided his time between London, Croagnes in southern France, and New Zealand. He was married to artist Pip Culbert (1938–2016) and made many collaborative works with artist Ralph Hotere.

== Early life and education ==
Culbert was educated at Hutt Valley High School, where his teachers included James Coe. He then studied at the Ilam School of Fine Arts at Canterbury University College in Christchurch from 1953 to 1956, alongside Pat Hanly, Gil Taverner, Quentin McFarlane, Trevor Moffitt, Ted Bullmore, Ted Bracey, John Coley and Hamish Keith, many who lived in the same house in Armagh Street. Culbert received a National Art Gallery scholarship in 1957 and left New Zealand to study painting at the Royal College of Art, London. He exhibited in the Young Contemporaries and Young Commonwealth Artists exhibitions alongside fellow expatriate New Zealander Billy Apple.

== Career ==
Culbert began to experiment with electric light in 1967. He had a solo exhibition at the Serpentine Gallery, London, in 1977 and in 1979, with funding from the Queen Elizabeth II Arts Council the Brooke Gifford Gallery in Christchurch assembled the survey exhibition Bill Culbert: London and New Zealand Works that was toured to public art museums throughout New Zealand. The touring survey exhibition Lightworks was organised by City Gallery Wellington in 1997. He participated in the first Auckland Triennial in 2001. In 2013 he represented New Zealand at the 55th Venice Biennale. His exhibition, titled Front Door Out Back, was displayed in the New Zealand pavilion, sited at the Istituto Santa Maria della Pietà.

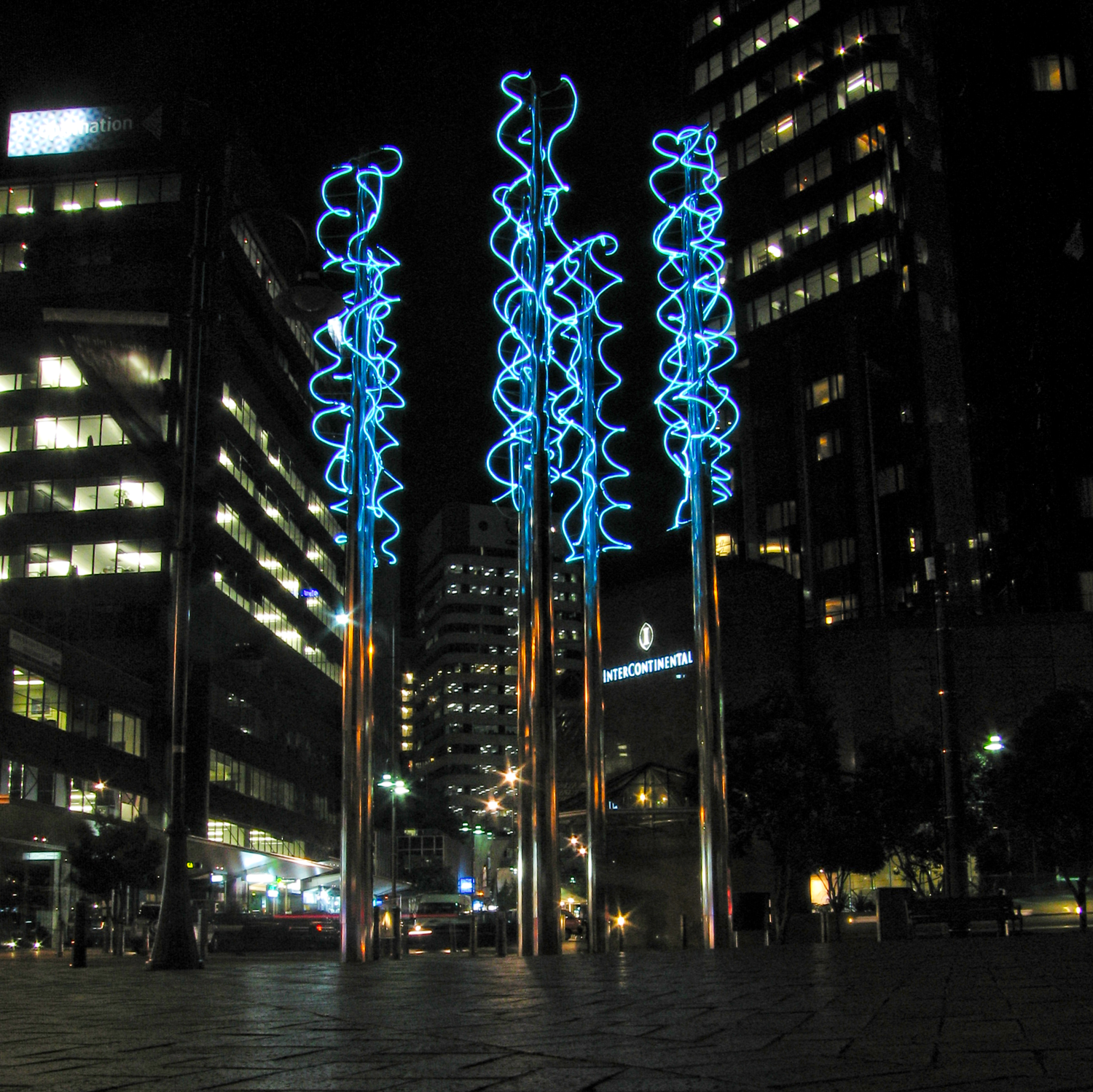
SkyBlues, Post Office Square, Wellington

He has permanent commissioned sculptures in London, Wellington and Auckland. Many are collaborative works with Ralph Hotere, including Fault on the facade of City Gallery Wellington (1994), Void (2006) in the atrium of Museum of New Zealand Te Papa Tongarewa and Black Stump, a 20m-high column outside the Vero Centre in Auckland. His work is held in public and private collections throughout New Zealand and Europe.

Culbert died on 28 March 2019.

== Awards, honours and fellowships ==
- National Art Gallery Scholarship (New Zealand), 1957
- Artist in Residence, University of Nottingham, 1963–65
- Greater London Arts Association Award, 1981
- Arts Council of Great Britain Holographic Bursary, Goldsmiths' Holography Workshop, Goldsmiths' College, London, 1982
- Residency, Museum of Holography, New York, 1985
- Residency, Exploratorium, San Francisco, 1989
- Member of the New Zealand Order of Merit, for services to art, particularly sculpture, 2008
