= Ted Bullmore =

New Zealand painter (1933–1978)

- Born: 1933; Balfour, New Zealand
- Died: 15 November 1978 (aged 44–45)
- Education: Canterbury School of Fine Arts
- Notable work: 'Astro forms' and 'Icon' series
- Style: Surrealism and construction

Edward "Ted" Aaron Alexander Bullmore (1933 – 15 November 1978) was a New Zealand artist known for his surrealistic and three-dimensional paintings one of which featured in Stanley Kubrick's 1971 film A Clockwork Orange.

== Early life ==
Edward Bullmore, known as Ted, was born in Balfour, in New Zealand's Southland Region, to William and Ann Bullmore in 1933. He attended the Balfour Public School and in 1947 continued his education at Christchurch Boys' High School. After leaving school Bullmore attended the Canterbury School of Fine Arts. His contemporaries there included students who would go on to become well-known artists and important cultural figures, such as Pat Hanly, John Coley, Quentin Macfarlane, Bill Culbert, Hamish Keith, Tony Fomison, and Trevor Moffitt. Bullmore graduated with a Diploma of Fine Arts (Hons) in 1955. While at art school he played representative rugby for Canterbury as a loose forward in 1954 and 1955, and also represented Auckland in 1956 when he moved there to take up a teacher training course. In all he would play 15 games for Canterbury and eight games for Auckland, and was described by rugby writer Lindsay Knight as 'a young player of extreme promise.' In 1958, Bullmore married Jacqueline La Roche, who had also been a student at art school. In the same year he began teaching at Tauranga District High School and in 1959 moved on to Tauranga Boys' College.

== Art career ==
After leaving art school Bullmore continued with his practice as an artist and exhibited a number of times in New Zealand. In 1959 he took part in a two person exhibition at the Willeston Gallery in Wellington as well as an exhibition sponsored by the Tauranga Art Society. Late in 1959 Bullmore and his wife Jacqueline La Roche traveled to Florence where he worked in the studio of the Italian painter Pietri Annigoni for six months. By 1960 the Bullmores had settled in London alongside other art school colleagues Pat Hanly and Bill Culbert who had been there since 1957. Bullmore painted during the day and joined Pat Hanly working at the Royal Court Theatre at night shifting scenery. He used scraps of spare canvas form the theater flats for his own paintings. The early sixties were marked by large scale antinuclear campaigns and activism. They inspired Bullmore’s nine-painting series Transition that explored ‘an aesthetic of nuclear paranoia’. The series explored a surrealist style, ‘influenced by the eerie dreamscapes of Giorgio de Chirico and Paul Nash’. Anxiety about a future with nuclear weapons is also reflected in Hanly’s work of the time. The figures painted by Bullmore in this period are often scarred as though eaten away by radioactivity; a typical example is Cuba Crisis painted in1963. His reputation as a painter grew rapidly and his work was featured in a number of important exhibitions. He was also elected as a member of the influential London Group which was one of the oldest artist-led organisations in the world. Bullmore also paintings back to New Zealand for exhibition in the Christchurch Group Show in 1962. Supporting himself and his family through teaching he worked his way up from secondary school to a tertiary position at the Sutton and Epsom Schools of Art and Design and the Brixton School of Building. Initially inspired by his time with Annigoni, Bullmore’s work was figurative and surrealist, but by 1964 he was using found pieces of furniture in 3-dimensional works. The first series was Hikarangi based on the New Zealand landscape and later between 1965 and 1967 he constructed more sexually themed works he titled Astro Forms. One of these was purchased by the film director Stanley Kubrick who included it in a set for A Clockwork Orange (1971). As Alex dances on the desk to Singing in the Rain you can see Bullmore’s ‘heart-shaped’ painting on the right.

== Selected exhibitions in London ==
1962 Fourth Annual Exhibition of Young Commonwealth artists. Bullmore showed in two more of these bi-annual exhibitions in 1964 and 1965. Of the 1965 exhibition the critic Frank Whitford of Art Review wrote that Bullmore was, "The most exciting artist here, indeed the star of the show .... His are highly original works, touching nerves at the frontier of the subconscious…”

1964 London Group exhibition, work from ‘Hikarangi’ series. Showing with Jean Horsley and Michael Browne.

1964 Group show Quantas Gallery Picadilly, London. The exhibition also included work by Ralph Hotere, Jean Horsley, Douglas MacDiarmid and Bill Culbert.

1966 Structure '66, the first open exhibition exclusively for sculpture and construction.

1967 Two Hundred Paintings Royal Institute Gallery, London. Bullmore was a member of the London Group and one of the selectors of the exhibition that included two of his works.

1967 Edward Bullmore Tama Gallery. Bullmore’s first solo exhibition in the UK and the first solo show held at the gallery Along with shaped canvases, Bullmore showed constructions made from disassembled chairs. ‘I have got dozens of old chairs that I haven’t used yet … you can often see me getting around London with a chair on the back of my motor scooter.’ Of one of the canvases art writer Stephen Cleland notes, ‘Bullmore was interested in treating the canvas like the body, where its surface becomes analogous to skin.’

=== Enchanted Domain ===
In 1967 two of Bullmore’s paintings and a sculpture were selected for the exhibition Enchanted Domain at Exeter University. Bookseller John Lyle organised the exhibition as part of the Exeter Festival of Modern Arts and it was shown at the Exeter City Gallery and Exe Gallery. The exhibition set out to show that the surrealist movement remained a current concern for contemporary artists (despite the death of its champion André Breton in 1966) and is now seen as having revived surrealism in Britain. Enchanted Domain included work by Pablo Picasso, Yves Tanguy, Giorgio de Chirico, Andre Masson, Jone Miro, Salvador Dali and many others.

== Return to New Zealand ==
The Bullmore family now included three children and they returned to New Zealand in 1969. Rotorua Boys’ High had offered Bullmore a teaching position which he accepted. Bullmore continued painting but the reputation he had developed in the UK did not follow him back to New Zealand. He mostly showed in Rotorua or nearby areas although he did exhibit four works from the Hikurangi series in the Christchurch Group show in 1971. He also showed a couple of times at the Barry Lett Galleries and was included in the 1976 Drawing Invitational organised by the Manawatu Art Gallery. In all, during the eight years following his return to New Zealand, Bullmore had 12 solo exhibitions and was included in 23 group shows. Despite this active exhibiting history his painted constructions were, as art historian Michael Dunn noted, ‘too unsettling to gain much of a reputation in his home country.’ Bullmore died of Paget's Disease on 15 November 1978 aged 45.

== Recognition and legacy ==
Bullmore’s importance was recognised in a number of ways after his death. In 1982 he was featured in the television art series Kaleidoscope. This focus on his life and art included commentary by fellow artists and his family and brought him national attention. A survey exhibition with catalogue Edward Bullmore: one decade on mounted by the Rotorua Art Gallery followed in 1988. A more unusual acknowledgement was made in a photograph taken by Peter Peryer in 1993. Edward Bullmore’s launch, Lake Tarawera has become a very well-known image with particular attention given to the Maori motifs on the vessel. In 2006 Jacqueline Bullmore, who was responsible for the large number of paintings, drawings and other art related material in Bullmore’s estate, gifted 287 of his art works to the Tauranga Gallery. The gift spurred the gallery in 2008 to produce a survey exhibition Edward Bullmore: A Surrealist Odyssey curated by Penelope Jackson which focused on Bullmore’s surrealist art. The exhibition toured to a number of venues in New Zealand and was accompanied by a fully illustrated catalogue. More recently in 2023 Penelope Jackson also curated Edward Bullmore: The London Years for the Tauranga Art Gallery.

=== Controversy ===
Around six years after Jacqueline Bullmore’s gift to the Tauranga Gallery, it was revealed that many of the remaining works held by the family had been ‘sold during the 1990s and early 2000s behind Jacqueline's back.’ Over 100 paintings were missing as the result of ‘swaps, trades, gifting, or even selling the art at a significant undervalue’ by a family member working with a local art dealer. One of these works was Hikurangi No. 3 that had been purchased by Te Papa Tongarewa Museum of New Zealand for $150,000 without Jacqueline Bullmore’s knowledge, although the Bullmore family fully support its inclusion in the collection.

Jacqueline Bullmore, died on 1 June 2019 aged 85.

=== Collections ===
Bullmore's work is in the collections of several major New Zealand art galleries including the following:

- Auckland Art Gallery view work here.
- Te Papa Tongarewa, Wellington view work here.
- Dowse Art Museum, Lower Hutt view work here.
- Eastern Southland Gallery, Gore
- Tauranga Art Gallery
- Invercargill Public Art Galleryview work here.
