= John Coley =

New Zealand painter (1935–2026)

John Coley MBE
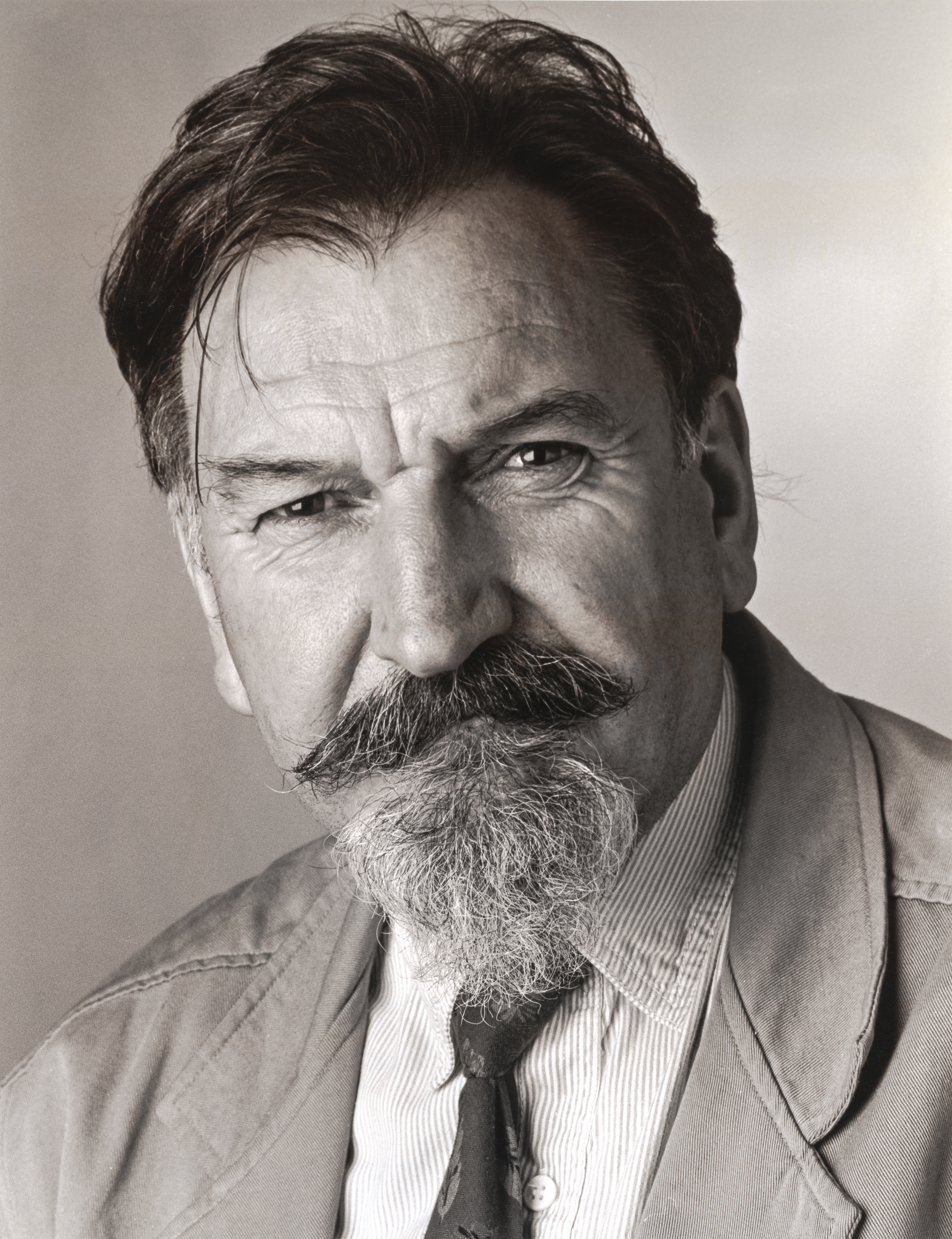
- Born: John William Coley; 28 January 1935; Palmerston North, New Zealand
- Died: 17 March 2026 (aged 91); Auckland, New Zealand
- Education: Canterbury College School of Art
- Known for: Painting, art criticism, curation and art administration
- Notable work: Abacus series

John William Coley MBE (28 January 1935 – 17 March 2026) was a New Zealand painter and art critic. He was director of the Robert McDougall Art Gallery (now known as the Christchurch Art Gallery Te Puna o Waiwhetu) from 1981 to 1995.

== Early life and art career ==
Coley was born in Palmerston North on 28 January 1935. He attended Palmerston North Boys’ High School and took evening art classes at the city's Technical School. Coley's first job was as a cadet reporter on the Manawatu Evening Standard.

In 1955, he studied at the Canterbury College School of Art in Christchurch, where he was taught by Russell Clark and Bill Sutton, alongside fellow students Ted Bracey, Pat Hanly, Gil Tavener (Hanly), Ted Bullmore, Hamish Keith and Bill Culbert. During his time at the art school, it moved from its city site to Ilam.

Coley graduated in 1957 and went on to teach at Papanui High School and later in the art department of the Christchurch Teachers' College. In 1959, he had his first solo exhibition at Gallery 91. Reviewing the show, The Press art critic Nelson Kenny wrote that Coley had "the gift of a colourist" and a "good unforced feeling for paint", adding that he was most successful in his larger paintings.

The following year, Coley was invited to exhibit with The Group and continued to do so annually—except in 1966 and 1968—until the final Group show in 1977. He received a Queen Elizabeth II Arts Council grant in 1964 and used it to visit the United States.

After returning, Coley helped form 20/20 Vision with other young Canterbury artists he knew from his student days. One project involved producing a set of commercially screen-printed artist prints, which were sold for two dollars each; contributors included Greer Twiss, Derek Mitchell, Don Peebles and Coley himself.

In 1967, Coley began his Abacus series, which became his best-known body of work; an example is held by the Dunedin Public Art Gallery.

== Robert McDougall Art Gallery ==
At the beginning of 1981, the director of the Robert McDougal Art Gallery in Christchurch, Rodney Wilson, left the gallery and the job was passed on to Coley. Wilson, as a challenge to the incoming director noted that "Christchurch deserves a bigger and better gallery than it has - it deserves the sort of programme that would result from the provision of more gallery space and spaces better suited to contemporary works". Coley would be director of the gallery for the next 15 years, his arrival described by artist Steve Furlonger as, "the kiss of life". A year after his appointment, Coley purchased Colin McCahon's As There is a Constant Flow of Light. The decision was not well received. A previous painting Tomorrow will be the same but not as this is, shown at Gallery 91, caused an uproar when the city librarian, Ron O'Reilly, attempted to have it donated to the gallery. Coley remained a champion of McCahon and in 1986 after a visit to that National Gallery of Australia and discussions with its first director James Mollison arranged the loan of an Arthur Boyd painting to the Robert McDougall Art Gallery. In exchange for McCahon's The Crucifixion According to St Mark which would feature in the new Australian National Gallery's inaugural installations. During his time at the gallery, Coley paid particular attention to contemporary art and the art of younger artists. To further highlight this focus he created the Robert McDougall Contemporary Art Annex.

=== The Robert McDougall Contemporary Art Annex ===
The Annex opened in 1988 in the Arts Centre that was formally University of Canterbury's town location. The programme was set out to focus on local and international touring exhibitions, with an emphasis on Canterbury art. In keeping with its name, the opening exhibition Here and Now included the work of 12 emerging Canterbury artists Joanna Braithwaite, Gary Collins, William Dunning, Neil Frazer, Jason Greig, Linda James, Grant Lingard, Philip Price, Richard Reddaway, Grant Takle, Bianca van Rangelrooy and Tracey Wilson.

==== Other exhibitions shown while Coley was director of the Robert McDougall Art Gallery included ====
- 1992 Prospect Canterbury 92 The exhibition that featured works by more than fifty artists showing work completed in 1992. The exhibition was curated by Lara Strongman. You can see the Annex gallery, the exhibition and Strongman talking about the work here.
- 1994 Aoraki / Hikurangi You can see a video featuring the exhibition here.
- 1995 Canterbury Belles Featuring the work of Canterbury artists Julia Morrison, Margaret Dawson and Mary Kay.

The Contemporary Art Annex would remain open for 12 years closing in 2000. Coley left the gallery in 1995, he was replaced by Tony Preston. In 2007, he moved to Auckland with his wife.

== Selected exhibitions ==
Coley has a long record of exhibitions as a painter and regularly showed in dealer galleries throughout New Zealand.

- 1959 John Coley Gallery 91 Christchurch.
- 1960 First show with The Group.
- 1965 New Zealand Painting (group) Auckland Art Gallery. Coley also showed in the 1961, 62 and 63 editions of this exhibition mounted by the Auckland Art Gallery.
- 1971 Recent Painting in Canterbury (group) Robert McDougall Art Gallery
- 1973 Canterbury Confrontations (group) Robert McDougall Art Gallery. Pan Pacific Arts Festival. Coley painted Leo Bensemann and Bensemann painted Coley.
- 1980 John Coley: Recent paintings CSA Gallery, Christchurch.
- 1995 About Town (group) Robert McDougall Art Gallery, Christchurch.
- 1998 40 out of 40 Canterbury Painters 1958-1998 (group) Robert McDougal Art Gallery, Christchurch.

== Writing ==
For a good part of the 1970s, Coley was an art critic for the Christchurch Star. For a short period in the early 1980s, before taking up the directorship of the Robert McDougall Art Gallery, he was also a critic and writer for Art New Zealand. In 2000, Coley had two books published: Jane Evans, an overview of the work of the Nelson-based artist published by Hazard Press, and Charles Luney: The Building of a Lifetime also published by the Hazard Press. Luney was the builder of many of Christchurch's best-known structures including the Miles Warren Town Hall and the James Hight Library at the University of Canterbury.

== Death ==
Coley died in Auckland on 17 March 2026, at the age of 91.

== Honours and awards ==
In the 1989 Queen's Birthday Honours, Coley was appointed a Member of the Order of the British Empire, for services to art.
