= Paul Johns (artist) =

New Zealand artist and photographer (born 1951)

- Born: 1951 (age 74–75); Christchurch
- Education: Ilam School of Fine Arts, University of Canterbury
- Known for: LGBTQ+ art activism and exhibitions
- Style: Conceptual film, installation and photography

Paul Johns (born 1951) is a conceptual artist and photographer living in Christchurch. Johns is one of a small number of gay artists who were early activists in New Zealand supporting and advocating for the recognition of the LGBTQ+ community in the arts.

== Early history ==
Paul Johns was born in Christchurch where he lives and works. He studied film making and sculpture at the Ilam School of Fine Arts at the University of Canterbury and in 1974 graduated with a Diploma of Fine Arts. Photographer Rhondda Bosworth was at art school with Johns in the 1970s and recalls it as a time when there was ‘a lively, “alternative” art scene, mostly sited at the down-market suburb of North Beach, involving printmakers, photographers, film-makers and musicians as well as painters and sculptors, makers of books, committed feminists, soft-drug dealers, persons of mixed gender and a prevailing atmosphere of sexual and artistic experimentation.’ Soon after leaving art school Johns developed what was to become a signature portrait style. Shooting films of his subjects he then used single frames from the processed film to create photographic portraits. Johns has said of the technique that, ‘Each shot is not just; a cursory glance — it is a close look achieved by multiple shots.”

== Art career ==
Three years after graduating from art school Johns was awarded a grant from the Queen Elizabeth II Arts Council of New Zealand and developed a solo exhibition at the Canterbury Society of Arts Gallery (CSA). It included a steel pyramid, a chair, a television case and metronome and still photos taken from films. Critic Michael Thomas described it as ‘Austere and even “classical” ‘. The next year Johns was caught up in controversy. He had photographed an Andrew Drummond's Crucifixion performance and ten of his Polaroid images were laid on a cross when Drummond exhibited a version of the work in the CSA exhibition Platforms. The photos were confiscated by police after a complaint and would become a central feature in a court case accusing Drummond, who appeared naked on the cross, in John's photos of obscenity. The adjudicating Magistrate found that while the John's images of Drummond may have been offensive to some that the defendants were unduly sensitive to nakedness and dismissed the charges. A more conventional presentation of his work took place later in the same year. Johns and fellow artist John Hurrell helped Billy Apple create one of his site specific works in the Brooke Gifford Gallery. They constructed a new gallery space for Apple that he left empty for his own exhibition but then invited Johns and Hurrell to use as a gesture of thanks for their assistance. Johns exhibited photos of the two gallery owners Barbara Brooke and Judith MacFarlane. Nearly 50 years later photos Johns had taken of Apple were shown at Starkwhite in Auckland to demonstrate how Apple's height had decreased with age over the years.

In 1986 New Zealand's Parliament passed the Homosexual Law Reform Act decriminalising sexual relations between men aged 16 and over. Two years later Johns was involved in the ground-breaking CSA exhibition Beyond Four Straight Sides (Homosexual) led by artist Grant Lingard and including three other gay artists Grant Lingard, Trevor Fry and Paul Rayner. This is believed to be the first time that artists identifying as gay had openly shown together in a public institution in New Zealand. Art critic Pat Unger summed up, ‘The exhibition relies on shock. Perhaps bravado… but traditionally artists, as outsiders, have been the critics of society. Better they continue to provoke reaction than become partners in some great soothing art exercise.’ Johns has exhibited regularly throughout the following decades. In 2005 he was awarded the Tylee Cottage Residency managed by the Sarjeant Gallery in Whanganui. Johns used the opportunity to photograph around the area of Jerusalem where poet James K. Baxter had spent some time.

An exhibition held in 2009 with the lengthy title Dear Paul. Thanks for your email. Usually the Japanese Government doesn't release hunt details. Their quota for summer is around 850 Minke Whales and 20-50 Fin Whales. Kind Regards, Anna P. highlighted Johns’ increasing involvement with environmental issues. The exhibition focussed on the abusive treatment of whales. It was supported by a street poster campaign and the proceeds from sales were donated to Greenpeace and Sea Shepherd. Johns revisited this subject in 2018 with an exhibition at the Christchurch Art Gallery Paul Johns: South Pacific Sanctuary / Peraki / Banks Peninsula. In his review Andrew Paul Wood noted the melancholic nature of Johns’ work from his early homoerotic work to what Paul Wood described as, ‘a compassionate response to the marginal and a quasi-mystical yearning for universalism.’ In a similar summary, writer Peter Ireland commented on what he saw as Johns’ dual contributions, ‘firstly, he instinctively recognises the memorial power of photographs; and secondly, his conceptual range enables him to transcend the narrower borders of the medium to construct scenarios that not only reinforce commemorative associations but set up poles between which these associations shimmer with a resonance like the humming of telegraph lines.’

== Selected exhibitions ==
1977 Paul Johns, Recent Work C.S.A. Gallery

1977 New Zealand Prints 1977 (group) Auckland Art Gallery.

1978 Group Show C.S.A Gallery, Christchurch.

1978 Paul Johns “Beverley.” Photographs and Prints. Brooke Gifford Gallery, Christchurch.

1978 Pyramid Visions C.S.A. Gallery, Christchurch.

1979 New Canterbury Contemporaries Robert McDougall Art Gallery, Christchurch.

1980 Benson & Hedges Art Award (group) Canterbury Society of Arts Gallery, Dowse art Gallery, Lower Hutt Christchurch.

1981 Artist Project: Paul Johns (working with a collaborator, Nicholas Register.

1982 Torsos Robinson and Brooker Gallery, Christchurch.

1982 Nine Artists (group) Robinson and Brooker Gallery, Christchurch.

1982 Face to Face (group) Robert McDougall Art Gallery, Christchurch.

1982 Centenary Exhibition (group) Canterbury Society of Arts, Christchurch.

1983 Ladies and Gentleman, Life and Death Brooke Gifford Gallery, Christchurch.

1986 Painting Group Show Manawa Gallery, 87 Cashel Street, Christchurch.

1987 When Art Hits the Headlines (group) National Art Gallery, Wellington.

1988 Thirty Canterbury Artists (group) Robert McDougall Art Gallery, Christchurch.

1988 Beyond Four Straight Sides (Homosexual) (group) CSA Gallery Christchurch.

1989 Seven Canterbury Photographers (group) Robert Christchurch Art Gallery.

1991 Paul Johns and Wilhelmus Ruifrok RKS ART Auckland Collaborative exhibition.

1998 I Want To Be Your Slave, Centre for Contemporary Art Christchurch Art Gallery.

2001 Office Space (group) Blue Oyster Gallery, Dunedin. Curated by Douglas Rex Kelaher and Dan Arps.

2002 Noughts, Crosses or Tiddlywinks? Blue Oyster Art Project Space, Dunedin.

2002 Victory Over Death (group) Peter McLeavey Gallery, Wellington.

2004 Telecom Prospect (group) City Gallery, Wellington. Curated by Emma Bugden.

2008 Spaghetti Junction: Martin Basher, Paul Johns, Eileen Leung, Peter Madden, Sanné Mestrom and Seung Yul Oh (group) 64zero3 Gallery, Christchurch

2009 Brought To Light (group) Christchurch Art Gallery.

2009 Dear Paul. Thanks for your email. Usually the Japanese Government doesn't release hunt details. Their quota for summer is around 850 Minke Whales and 20-50 Fin Whales. Kind Regards, Anna P. Physics Room, Christchurch.

2012 Running on Pebbles: through-lines with incidents and increments (group) Snakepit, Auckland. Curated by Allan Smith.

2013 All There Is Left (group) Adam Art Gallery, Wellington. With Lieko Shiga and Francis Alys. Review by Peter Ireland.

2014 Paul Johns McNamara Gallery, Whanganui.

2015 Paul Johns: South Pacific Sanctuary / Peraki / Banks Peninsula Christchurch Art Gallery.

2016 The Bill: For Collective Unconscious (group) Artspace, Auckland. A celebration of the 30th anniversary of the Homosexual Law Reform Act.

2017 I hate you, I hate you, I hate you, because I don’t hate you; I love you... (group) Artspace and Michael Lett, Auckland. Exhibition created for the Auckland Pride Festival.

2018 (May) Look at the Crowd in Swimming Ilam Campus Gallery School of Fine Arts, University of Canterbury, Christchurch.

2021 Been Here Long? Visions, Auckland.

2021 Listening Stones Jumping Rocks (group) Adam Art Gallery Te Pātaka Toi Wellington. Curated by Sophie Thorn.

2003 Reaching Out: Calling New Age Power (group) Enjoy Public Art Gallery, Wellington.

2024 Beautiful Flowers and How to Grow Them Dowse Art Museum, Lower Hutt. Curated by DJCS for the City Gallery, Wellington.

2024 Billy Apple, Starkwhite, Auckland.

== Collections ==
Auckland Art Gallery Toi o Tāmaki

Te Whare o Rehua Sarjeant Gallery

Te Papa Tongarewa
