= Barbara Brooke =

Barbara Brooke may refer to:

- Barbara Brooke (art dealer) (1925–1980), New Zealand art dealer
- Barbara Brooke, Baroness Brooke of Ystradfellte (1908–2000), British politician
