= Leo Bensemann =

NZ artist, printer, typographer, publisher and editor (1912–1986)

Leo Bensemann OBE
- Born: Leo Vernon Bensemann; 1 May 1912; Tākaka, New Zealand
- Died: 2 January 1986 (aged 73); Christchurch, New Zealand
- Known for: Painting; caricatures; printing; typography; publishing and editing
- Notable work: Portrait of Rita Angus (in collection of Te Papa Tongarewa)
- Spouse: Mary Barrett (m. 1943)

Leo Vernon Bensemann OBE (1 May 1912 – 2 January 1986) was a New Zealand artist, printer, typographer, publisher and editor.

== Early life ==
Bensemenn was born in Tākaka on 1 May 1912, the son of Victor Bensemann, a blacksmith, and his wife, Ruby Arnold. He was educated at Nelson College from 1925 to 1930, and in 1931 moved to Christchurch with his friend Lawrence Baigent. In February 1938, Bensemann and Baigent moved to Christchurch and flatted in a house owned by the artist Sydney Thompson at 97 Cambridge Terrace. Rita Angus also lived at the Cambridge Terrace address, which became a meeting place for the Christchurch art scene with people like Louise Henderson, Olivia Spencer Bower, Allen and Betty Curnow, Francis Shurrock, Frederick Page and Evelyn Page, Denis Glover and Douglas Lilburn regular visitors.

== Career ==
=== Printer and typographer ===
In 1935, Denis Glover and John Drew set up the Caxton Press and in 1937 printed their first art publication, Bensemann's Fantastica: Thirteen Drawings. Bensemann assisted with the printing of the book and this led to his joining Caxton Press as a partner in 1937, and staying with the business until 1978. In 1960, with architect Peter Beavan, sculptor Tom Taylor and others, Bensemann helped form the New Zealand Design Association, "to develop and raise standards of design throughout the country". Recognising the absence of a journal devoted to contemporary art, in 1966 Bensemann and Barbara Brooke produced five issues of art magazine Ascent. Art writer Ross Fraser congratulated Ascent on its ability to get their writers to push back and provide feedback good or bad. Bensemann retained a strong interest in typography throughout his career at Caxton press and in 1969 was awarded a QEII Arts Council travel grant to Europe to study typography and graphic art. After leaving the Caxton Press, Bensemann set up his own publishing house in 1978, producing several books under the imprint of The Huntsbury Press.

=== Artist ===
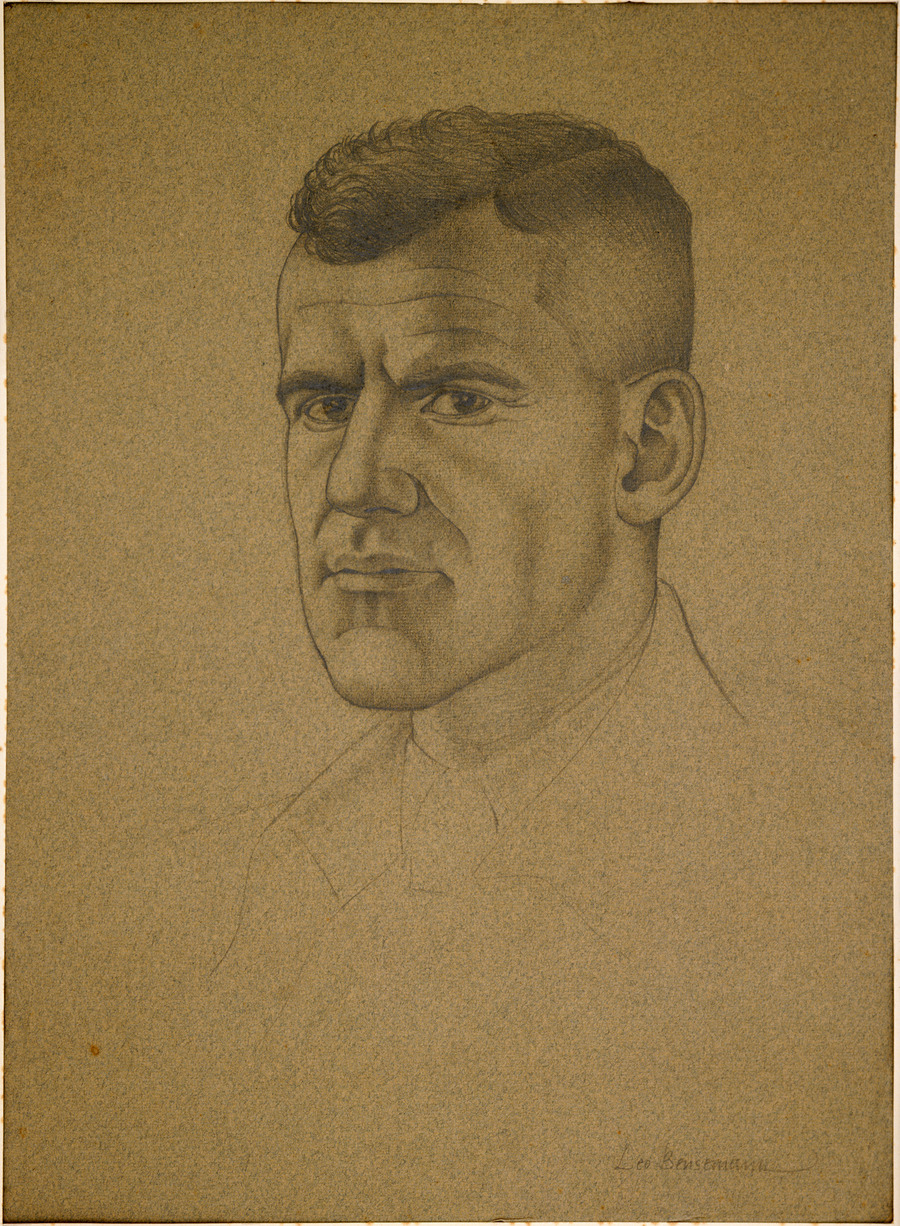
Study for a portrait of Lieutenant Keith Elliott by Bensemann

While flatting in Cambridge Terrace, and supported by Angus's nomination, Bensemann joined The Group in 1938. Seven of the nine works he submitted to this exhibition were portraits – including a self-portrait, a portrait of Rita Angus and one of Lawrence Baigent. He continued to show regularly as a Group member and was represented in the final exhibition in 1977 with four paintings, this time all landscapes. Bensemann was a regular exhibitor of paintings, caricatures and typography in both dealer galleries and public venues through to the 1980s. His work is represented in a number of public collections in New Zealand. The first painting to enter a public collection was Canterbury Spring (1961), purchased by the Robert McDougall Art Gallery the same year it was painted.

=== Solo exhibitions ===
Bensemann's solo exhibitions included:

- 1972 Leo Bensemann Retrospective Rue Pompallier Gallery Akaroa. 38 paintings from 1936 to 1972. Critic G.T.M described Bensemann as one of the early artists who, ‘began to “see” New Zealand rather than just “look” at it.’
- 1979 Leo Bensemann Brooke Gifford Gallery, Christchurch
- 1981 Leo Bensemann: Drawings Brooke Gifford Gallery, Christchurch
- 2011 Leo Bensemann: A Fantastic Art Venture Christchurch Art Gallery. The exhibition was only open for 12 days closing prematurely when Christchurch suffered a major earthquake.
- 2025 Leo Bensemann: Paradise Garden Christchurch Art Gallery Toi Wai Whetu “paintings based on the hills, beaches and intriguing karst rock formations that dominate Mohua Golden Bay”

== Collections ==
Bensemann's work is held in public collections, including:

- Christchurch Art Gallery
- Auckland Art Gallery
- Dunedin Public Art Gallery
- The Suter Art Gallery

== Honours and awards ==
In the 1985 New Year Honours, Bensemann was appointed an Officer of the Order of the British Empire, for services to art, literature and printing.
