= Rosemary Johnson (artist) =

New Zealand artist

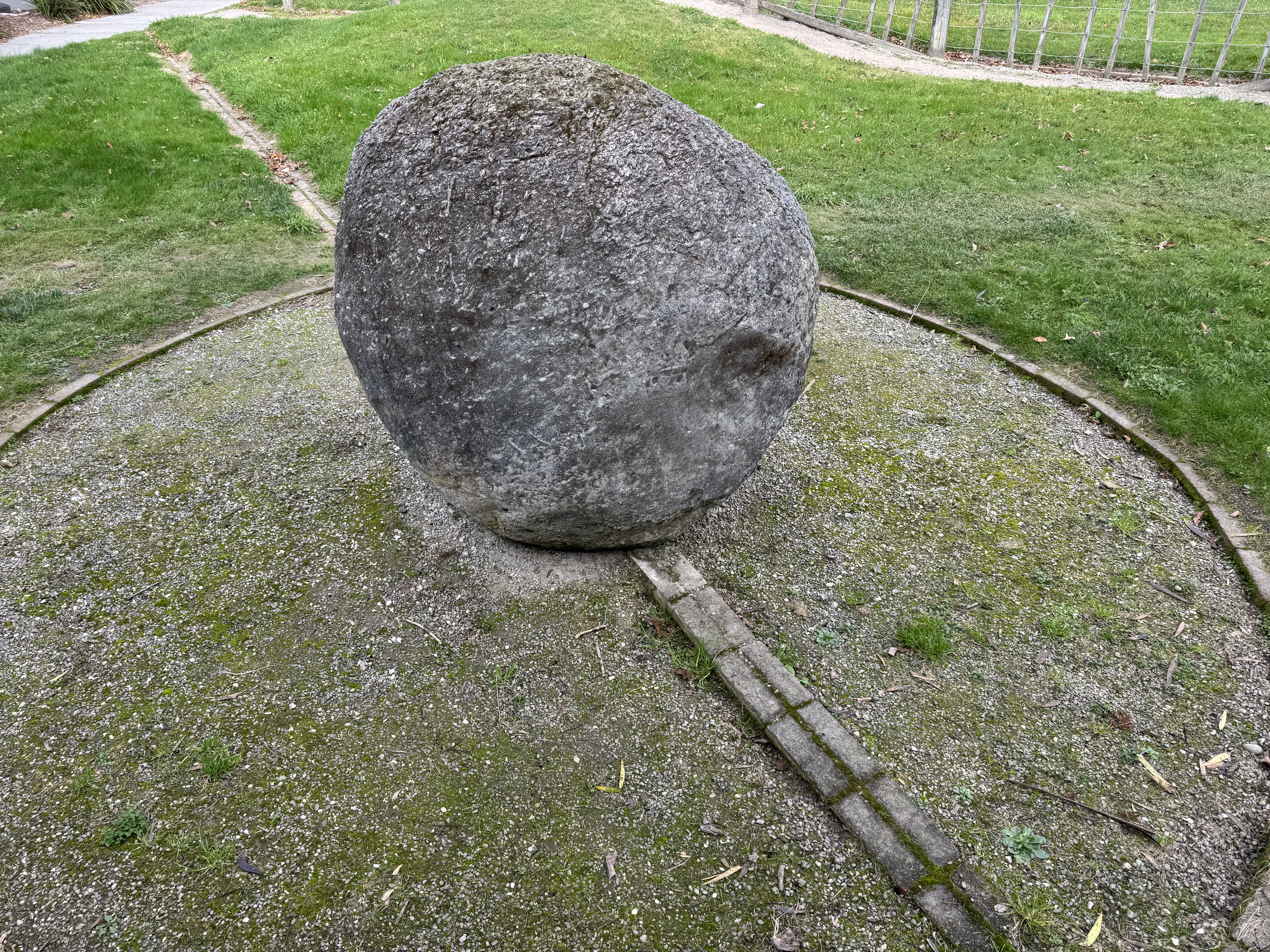
- Detail of Rosemary Johnson's An Installation. Collection University of Canterbury
- Born: 1942; Christchurch
- Died: 14 January 1982 (aged 39–40); Christchurch
- Education: University of Canterbury
- Known for: Installations
- Notable work: 'An Installation'
- Style: Conceptual sculpture and installation
- Spouse: Richard Muller
- Children: Barbara and Robert

Rosemary Eleanor Muller (née Johnson) (1942–1982) was an artist and educator who played an important role in the development of feminist and environmental art in New Zealand.

== Early life and education ==
Rosemary Johnson was born in Christchurch in 1942, the youngest daughter of Richard Nayott Darvall Johnson and his wife Rose Eleanor Clare. She attended the University of Canterbury School of Art from 1961 and graduated with a diploma in Fine Arts in sculpture, the only student of her year to be awarded Honours. In 1966 she went to study at the Central School of Art and Design in London. There she specialised in metal casting and developed an interest in the bronze cast sculptures of Henry Moore. After leaving the Central School she continued her training in the bronze casting process in Germany. Johnson kept a close association with New Zealand while in the UK and sent work back for exhibition. For example, the fibreglass sculpture Bird Sleeping was included in the 1968 Christchurch Festival exhibition. She also exhibited in the UK. She participated in the Brighton Festival in 1968 and in shows with the John Whibley Gallery and Jacey Galleries in London. It was during this period that Johnson met her husband to be, the German chef Richard Muller. In 1969 the couple returned to New Zealand to live in Dunedin for a time before moving to Christchurch. Here Muller ran the restaurant Angus Steaks in Regent Street above a gallery managed by Johnson. Early in 1972 her daughter Barbara was born followed by her son Robert. From 1972 Johnson began teaching at the Department of Extension Studies at the University of Canterbury where she remained for two years. In 1975 she was awarded a Queen Elizabeth II Arts Council grant and in 1978 she attended the 10th International Sculpture Conference in Toronto, Canada alongside sculptor Tom Taylor and designer Martin Mendelsburg. She was also able to join a pre-conference foundry course run by the Ontario College of Art.

== Art career ==
Throughout the 1970s Johnson showed regularly at local venues such as the Canterbury Society of Arts (CSA) and was an exhibiting member of The Group. Her first dealer show in New Zealand was with the Barry Lett Galleries in Auckland and she continued to show in New Zealand and Australia. A mark of the respect in which her work was held can be seen in the artists that were selected alongside Johnson for the 1975 Christchurch Festival: Tom Taylor, Larence Shustak, Neil Dawson, Carl Sydow, Michael Thomas, Martin Mendelsberg, John Coley, and Bruce Edgar.’ In 1978, along with Neil Dawson and Martin Mendlesberg, Johnson helped organise and exhibited in the controversial exhibition Platforms where three platforms, a square, rectangle or cruciform were available to feature the work of the 15 artists at the Canterbury Society of Arts Gallery. Johnson's own work was described as, ‘Rhythmic landscape forms, in highly polished manganese bronze and tinted Perspex.’

== Feminism ==
As the 1970s progressed, Johnson became increasingly involved with feminist issues. As part of the ‘77 Women's Convention, she made the installation Birth Piece that served as the entrance to the exhibition. The feminist artist Allie Eagle described the work as, ‘a simple construction, various coloured pieces, some patterned, some plain, of very light, flimsy fabric (like summer nightie material) cut and layered into hanging panels, three partitions thick, up the stairs. The sensation of the filmy materials brushing against my face as I went through them re-called for me a sense of femaleness I might have known before or on being born.’ The success of Birth Piece resulted in an invitation to show in the opening exhibition of the Women's Gallery in Wellington, but already suffering from what became a terminal illness, she was unable to accept. She did send work to a Women's Gallery exhibition later in the year called Diaries 1980. Marian Evans, one of the founding members of the Women's Gallery, recalled this work as, ‘fragile batiked pieces of orange cloth (she had a strong belief in the powers of individual colours, and she believed orange to be the most healing) with white paper clouds attached, on which she had written her diary.’ Johnson was also closely involved with the Sculpture Project and Spirituality exhibitions held in the Women's Gallery in 1981. She was fondly remembered as a key player in forwarding feminism's role in the arts by Marion Evans, ‘Rosemary's visits to Wellington were always stimulating and joyful occasions for me. She was as scrupulous in her dealings with those of us who worked in the gallery as she was in making her art.’

== Installations and commissions ==
From the mid-1970s Johnson's interests turned from small individual sculptures to large-scale installations with a growing concern with the environment. An early indication of this trend was her contribution to an exhibition with environmental themes at the CSA Gallery in 1974. Her work consisted of six solid "cloud" forms just above eye level and light enough to move with any air currents. The work was presented with music and at the opening accompanied by a dry ice mist.

=== 1975 ===
==== Clouds and Mountains ====
Johnson installed one of her best-known works Clouds and Mountains in the terminal of the Christchurch Airport. The solid cloud forms ‘floated’ above several stainless steel shapes that sat in a small courtyard garden created in an unused stairwell space. The work was de-commissioned in 1994 when the Christchurch airport was extended and taken into the collection of the Christchurch Art Gallery.

=== 1978–1980 ===
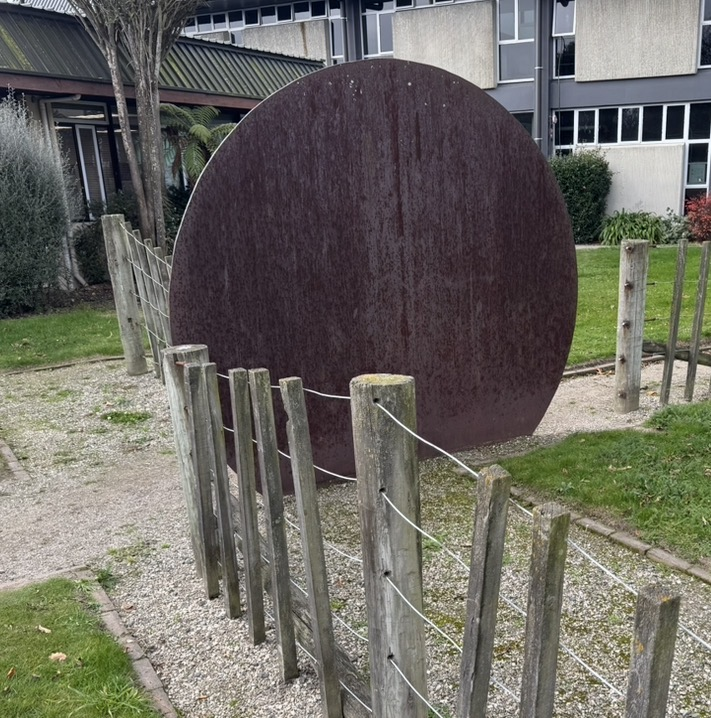
Rosemary Johnson An Installation. University of Canterbury Art Collection

==== An Installation ====
In 1978 the University of Canterbury's Art Collection commissioned Johnson to make a work. The result was An Installation which covers an area of roughly 30 x 40 meters and remains the largest artwork in the collection. It consists of two running fence lines ‘in the shape of a cross, intersected by a circular steel sun or moon disc, and surrounded by an earth mound and boulders’. Situated in a courtyard next to the Jack Mann Auditorium, An Installation was completed in 1980. That said, art gallery director and art critic John Coley noted, ‘Unfortunately a bald description of its parts fails to convey the strong, singular flavour of the sculpture. It is a complex, major installation that commands one's attention.’ Art critic Michael Thomas described the work as carrying the idea of, ‘the universe with its cosmic energy reaching out in all directions’ with the fence acting as a ‘metaphor for time passing as it progresses through the man-made hillock that suggests a burial mound.’ Johnson has inscribed on the steel disk ‘at the centre of all is the circle.’ Art historian Anne Kirker noted in 1986 that the installation was, ‘among the most advanced pieces commissioned in New Zealand in recent years’. Johnson herself said of the work that she, 'wanted to humanise the space, giving it a scale that related to people.’

=== 1981 ===
==== Fence Line – Link ====
This installation created at City Gallery, Wellington featured fence posts, twine and a wool bale trailing up the stairs from the ground floor and across the first-floor gallery ending at a projected photographic image of fence posts.’

Faced with terminal cancer, Johnson began to include performances within her installations for the last years of her life. These focused on concepts of despair, belief and spiritual renewal.

==== Ring of Light ====
Johnson made a series of large scale installations at the Women's Gallery in Wellington over the course of the year. The works were associated with death and the spirit using renewable or recycled materials such as stone circles, tape, candles, wool, and wood. Artist and academic Bridie Lonie described Johnson's performance within the installations as, ’tentative – the first piece had none, the second a private ritual within a stone and candle circle, in the third piece the audience formed the circle, holding candles. She was unsure about the last piece; the wind blew the candles out. For the people forming this circle, this didn't mar its beauty.’

==== Fractures ====
The Women's Gallery, Wellington. Here and in some other works Johnson made use of 35mm slide projectors. This installation and performance was supported by Bridie Lonie at the Women's Gallery and examined Johnson's identity as an artist and woman. Dressed as a cocktail waitress she arranged flowers in crystal vases before changing into a boiler suit and destroyed each vase.

==== Falling Fence ====
This installation was part of ANZART – Australian and New Zealand Art held in Christchurch. Johnson's work was installed in the quadrangle of the Arts Centre with a farm-style fence attached to the Art Centre building collapsing as it crossed the lawn.

At this time Johnson was close to the end of her life but continued to ‘explore new means of expression on a range of ideas which examined both despair and belief’.

==== Renewal ====
This installation and performance were part of the Women's Gallery exhibition Women and the Environment and was situated near the gallery on Harris Street in Wellington. Participants walked along a long line of battens to form a circle within a circle.

=== 1982 ===
Malvern Community Arts Council Commission. This work is installed on two sites linked by a line of boulders between a church and Darfield High School. Initially proposed as a sculptural addition to the church grounds, it has also become a place where the ashes of members of the church's congregation can be interred. Johnson visited the site and was able to prepare working drawings, finalise a model of the work and select some of the boulders before her death. The installation itself was overseen by Tom Taylor, senior lecturer in sculpture at the University of Canterbury School of Fine Arts with the help of local tradespeople. Art critic Brett Riley described the work as, ‘strong, yet quiet…It is, now, a part of that landscape, specifically, Rosemary Johnson's part of that landscape.’

== Death ==
Johnson died in Burwood hospital, Christchurch on 14 January 1982.

In 1984 Johnson's mother funded the Rosemary Johnson Muller Scholarship to assist students of sculpture at the School of Fine Arts of the University of Canterbury.

== Selected exhibitions ==
Johnson showed regularly at the CSA and was a member of The Group. She was included in the 1970, '71, '72, '73, '76 and '77 Group shows.

- 1970 – Barry Lett Gallery (solo) Auckland (First one woman exhibition) also showed in 1972 and 1975.
- 1971 – New Zealand Young Contemporaries (group) Auckland Art Gallery Toi o Tāmaki.
- 1971 – The Hansells Sculpture Award (group) years 1971, 1972, 1973, 1974 and was guest exhibitor 1976.
- 1971 – Sculptors Group (group) Held on the banks of the Avon river.
- 1973 – Eight Young Artists (group) New Zealand Academy of Fine Arts, Wellington.
- 1974 – Rosemary Johnson (solo) Robert McDougall Art Gallery.
- 1977 – Touch (group) National Art Gallery, Wellington.
- 1980 – Diaries & touring Women-in-Touch postcards (group) Women's Gallery, Wellington.
- 1980 – Package Deal (group) CSA. Gallery, Christchurch.
- 2001 – parts (group) Christchurch Art Gallery.
- 2022 – Perilous (group) Christchurch Art Gallery.

== Collections ==
- Collection at Dowse Art Museum
- Collection at Christchurch Art Gallery
