= Bullmore =

Bullmore is a surname. Notable people with the surname include:

- Amelia Bullmore (born 1964), British actress, screenwriter, and playwright
- Edward Bullmore (born 1960), British neuropsychiatrist, neuroscientist, and academic
- Herbert Bullmore (1874–1937), British rugby union player
- Ted Bullmore (1933–1978), New Zealand artist
- William Bullmore (1912–1972), Canadian politician
- Kerry Packer (1937–2005), Australian media magnate, whose full name was Kerry Francis Bullmore Packer
