= Jim Siers =

James Siers
- Born: 1936; Poland
- Died: 17 December 2013 (aged 76-77); Fiji
- Scientific career
- Fields: Ethnography; Adventure, Photography, Author

James Siers (1936 in Poland – 17 December 2013 in Fiji) was an author of numerous books on the Pacific Islands, a film maker and record producer and was well known for his work on television in Wellington, New Zealand.

== Biography ==
Siers was born in Poland in 1936 and came to New Zealand as a child in 1944 as an eight-year-old war refugee. The first time he went to the Pacific was in 1962 or 1963 on a journalistic assignment. After a long career as an author and film maker he moved to Fiji and became a resort owner.

== Writings and observations ==
With a more than keen interest in the Polynesian islands, its people and its many cultures, James Siers via his books has attempted to show the similarities and differences with the people of the Pacific. In his book Polynesia in Colour, he takes the reader on a journey through various island nations, from Samoa to Tahiti to New Caledonia.

He had a lengthy association with the Hibiscus Records label as a producer and contributor of its liner notes. Some of his liner notes have appeared on Viking Records releases such as The Family of the Maori, Viking VSP 18 .

== Books released ==
- Samoa in Colour, ISBN 0-589-00455-7 (1970)
- Polynesia in Colour, ISBN 0-8048-0866-X (1970)
- Hawaii, ISBN 0-06-013769-X (1973)
- Hawaii & Polynesia, ISBN 0-385-08167-7 (1973)
- Tahiti in color: Couleurs de Tahiti, ISBN 0-8048-1056-7 (1973)
- Tonga, ISBN 0-908582-32-3 (1978)
- Taratai: A Pacific Adventure, ISBN 0-908582-00-5 (1978)
- Taratai II: A Continuing Pacific Adventure, ISBN 0-908582-28-5 (1978)
- New Zealand: Dramatic landscape, ISBN 0-908582-40-4 (1979)
- Fiji In Colour, ASIN: B0006E6X4W (1979)
- Tahiti - Romance and Reality, ISBN 0-312-59587-5 (1982)
- Papua New Guinea, ISBN 0-312-59587-5 (1984)
- Fiji: Celebration, ISBN 0-312-28930-8 (1985)
- New Zealand: Incredible Landscape, ISBN 0-312-57170-4 (1985)
- with Hamish Keith (1986). Above Auckland. Auckland: Millwood Press. ISBN 9780908582785.
- Fiji Islands (Insight Pocket Guides) (Paperback), ISBN 0-395-73397-9 (1995)

== Films ==
- Viking of the Sunrise
- Eye of the Octopus
