= Grant Lingard =

New Zealand visual artist (1961–1995)

- Born: 1961; Blackball, New Zealand
- Died: 10 November 1995 (aged 33–34); Sydney, Australia
- Education: Ilam School of Fine Arts, University of Canterbury
- Known for: LGBTQ+ art activism and exhibitions
- Notable work: 'Flag' and 'Strange Bedfellows'
- Style: Minimalism and found objects
- Partner: Peter Lanini

Grant Lingard (1961–10 November 1995) was a New Zealand-born artist best known for his minimalist sculptural installations and as a champion of gay visual artists.^{[1]}

== Early years ==
Lingard was born in Blackball and grew up in towns on the West Coast of New Zealand. In 1981 he moved to Christchurch to study at the Ilam School of Fine Arts at the University of Canterbury and in 1984 he graduated with a Diploma of Fine Arts in painting. Staying on in Christchurch, Lingard established a studio in the Old Mill building in Addington and abandoned painting to concentrate on constructions made from found materials." Lingard's first solo exhibition was Skeletons at the James Paul Gallery the year after he graduated. The Christchurch Press's reviewer John Hurrell noted Lingard's move to sculpture describing the works as, 'very much wall reliefs based on open box-like forms…' Hurrell also commented that, 'resolved exhibitions like this are very rare in Christchurch.' Jonathan Smart, one of Lingard's dealers, later described his practice as, " … reworking Minimal and found object art traditions (now enshrined within Modernism) towards figuration and politics..."

== Early contributions as a gay artist ==
As Lingard was growing up sexual relations between men aged 16 and over were still criminalised and this did not change until Lingard was 25 in 1986. Writing in the Christchurch Press, journalist and artist Adrienne Rewi remembered Lingard for his unwavering support of the LGBTQ community. In his work he struggled to make the gay community more visible through his 'overt references to gay sexuality and his ability to treat such themes with disarming playfulness' In 1986 was awarded a Queen Elizabeth II Arts Council Award and the following year he won the $1,500 Guthrey CSA Travel Award. He was able to travel to Australia, visit art schools and study political art and cultural minorities. Following this experience Lingard was the driving force the next year behind the landmark exhibition Beyond Four Straight Sides (Homosexual) held at the CSA Gallery in Christchurch. Three other gay artists were included, Trevor Fry, Paul Johns and Paul Rayner, and it was probably the first exhibition in a public gallery in Aotearoa New Zealand to have homosexuality as its specific subject. It met with a mixed reception but as art critic Pat Unger reminded readers, '…traditionally artists, as outsiders, have been the critics of society. Better they continue to provoke reaction than become partners in some great soothing art exercise.'

== The Australian years ==
In 1989 Lingard moved to Sydney which was well-known for its very active gay community. His first exhibition there was at The Works Gallery and he showed over the next few years often in conjunction with the Sydney Gay and Lesbian Mardi Gras. Throughout these years he maintained an active exhibiting presence in New Zealand. In 1993 his exhibition Smells Like Team Spirit at Jonathan Jensen Gallery used rugby, the dominant sport in both Australia and New Zealand, to highlight the differences and implications of being gay in a heightened male environment. The work Strange Bedfellows featured four flagons of beer each labelled with explicitly derogatory terms that have been used to describe gay men. Justin Paton in his review commented, 'This sense of humour, this quality of camp or erotic wit, is the richest continuity in Lingard's sculptures. "Impropriety is the soul of wit," said Somerset Maugham. So it is with Lingard's art. "And wit", he seems to want to add, "is the soul of subversion".

== The final period ==
In 1993 Lingard had been tested HIV positive and by 1994 his health was in decline from AIDS-related complications. Although these resulted in his death the following year he was able to dramatically increase his output. Lingard made work for six exhibitions and also spent time in New Zealand as artist in residence at the Ilam School of Fine Arts University of Canterbury. Lingard's initial approach to his work had involved the quick assembly of found materials, titling, and then sending them off for exhibition but by 1994 his practice had changed. His work had become more philosophic allowing ideas to emerge of their own volition. As Lingard put it, 'Where once I was dependent on language to tie together often disparate groups of objects, now each material (its colour, texture, smell) is considered and thought through.' While he was in Christchurch he also contributed to the Tales Untold project where he used men's underwear as a symbol of the conflicts he had experienced in approaches to sexuality. A flag made from men's Y-front underwear also flew in front of the Canterbury Museum throughout the exhibition. The local paper noted, "For many people a poignant memory of Grant Lingard is the boldly flying Flag outside the Canterbury Museum which, along with other stitched items, was created by Lingard as an assertion of gay culture.' Critic Francis McWhannell commented on the flag, "The monumental scale of the piece, intensified by the closeness of the gallery space, immediately puts me in mind of flags used to claim territory or territorial victory.' He noted that Lingard himself had described it as, 'a small Up Yours, victory for me the artist.' Men's underwear also appeared on posters pasted up around the city. However, despite regular exhibitions Lingard was still comparatively unknown to the art public. This changed when he was included in the exhibition Art Now in late 1994. (see exhibition list below) at the Museum of New Zealand Te Papa Tongarewa. His work was subject to a series of complaints, mostly focussed on his challenges to macho male culture. Much of the controversy was generated through articles in the media such as the Sunday Star Times article headlined Art for Art's Sake? by reporter Jane Bowron who cast 'a layperson's eye' over the exhibition. Bowron toured Art Now with a lift maintenance operator who was unsurprisingly unimpressed by contemporary art and 'didn't get it'. The curator of the exhibition Christina Barton defended the show making it clear that the works required more than a 'ten second glance'.

== Tributes ==
Grant Lingard died on 10 November 1995. His last planned exhibition Swan Song was installed by friends in February the following year. One of the crew assembling the exhibition, artist Ruth Watson, recalled setting up the work from which the exhibition took its name – a set of white-wire drying racks covered with white sheets, towels and pillowcases, 'Grant knew he was dying and chose to make a work that spoke to his condition. As a representation of serious illness (messy, time consuming, all consuming), Swan song seems low on emotion, without histrionics. Its repetitions represent the ongoing hassle of everyday life with disease, of being fixed to mundane activities, addressed in a very simple, elegant way.' In 1998 the Grant Lingard Scholarship at the Ilam School of Fine Arts was established by the estate of Peter Lanini, Grant's partner. Since his death Lingard's reputation has grown and been the subject of a number of tribute and retrospective exhibitions.

== Selected exhibitions ==
1984

- Paul Dew, Teri Johnson, Grant Lingard, Richard Reddaway, Grant Takle — paintings, sculpture (group) Great Hall, Art Centre Christchurch.

1985

- Totems (group) CSA Gallery, Christchurch.
- Skeletons James Paul Gallery.
- Grant Lingard CSA Gallery, Christchurch.

1986

- You’re a Long Time Dead Christchurch Artists Collective (CAC).
- Paintings, Drawings and Sculpture (group) James Paul Gallery, Christchurch.
- Christchurch Artists’ Cooperative Exhibition (group) 73 Manchester Street, Christchurch.

1988

- Beyond Four Straight Sides (group) CSA Gallery, Christchurch.
- Incident in the Park Jonathan Jensen Gallery, Christchurch. Also shown at Artspace, Auckland November–December the same year.
- Beyond Four Straight Sides (Homosexual) (group) CSA Gallery Christchurch.
- Here and Now: Twelve Young Canterbury Artists (group) Robert McDougall Contemporary Art Annex, Christchurch. This exhibition opened the new Robert McDougall Art Annex.
- Grant Lingard: Lucy Macdonald: Richard Reddaway (group) Artspace, Auckland.

1989

- Installation at 331/3 Gallery Wellington.
- Grant Lingard Jonathan Jensen, Christchurch.
- Like is Pleased with Like (group) The Works Gallery, Sydney.

1991

- Beauty and the Beast (group) Tin Sheds, Sydney in association with the Gay Mardi Gras.

1992

- Vanitas (group) McDougall Art Annex, Christchurch.
- Implicated and Immune: Artists Responses to AIDS (group) Fisher Gallery, Auckland.

1993

- Smells Like Team Spirit Jonathan Jensen Gallery, Christchurch.

1994

- Breathless (group) Teststrip Gallery, Auckland.
- Coop Jonathan Jensen Gallery, Christchurch.
- Art Now: The First Biennial Review of Contemporary Art (group) Museum of New Zealand Te Papa Tongarewa, Wellington. Curator Tina Barton.
- Tales Untold: Unearthing Christchurch Histories (group) South Island Art Projects Christchurch. Nine sites around the city.
- Stimulus to Style (group) CSA Gallery, Christchurch. Curated by John Hurrell.
- Sugar Lift (group) Canterbury School of Fine Arts Gallery, Christchurch.

1995

- Vaseline (group) First Draft Gallery, Sydney. With Trevor Fry and Paul Rayner.

1996

- Swan Song: A Work in Progress First Draft Gallery, Sydney.
- Desire and Derision Jonathan Smart Gallery, Christchurch

2002

- Victory Over Death (group) Peter McLeavey Gallery, Wellington.

2015

- Implicated and Immune (group) Michael Lett, Auckland.

2018

- Sleeping Arrangements (group) Dowse Art Museum. Curated by Simon Gennard.

2021

- True Love: a Tribute to Grant Lingard Ilam Campus Gallery.

2022

- Grant Lingard: Needs and Desires Christchurch Art Gallery.

2024

- Perilous: Unheard Stories from the Collection (group) Christchurch Art Gallery.

== Essential Reading ==
- Jeremiah Boniface Grant Lingard 1961–1995

== Collections ==
- Christchurch Art Gallery
- Te Papa Tongarewa

== Works ==
- Flags and Boots(1994)
