= Reed Publishing =

New Zealand publisher

- Parent company: Penguin Group
- Founded: 1907
- Status: Acquired
- Genre: Books, records
- Country of origin: New Zealand

Reed Publishing (NZ) Ltd (formerly A. H. Reed Ltd and A. H. and A. W. Reed Ltd) was one of the leading publishers in New Zealand. It was founded by Alfred Hamish Reed and his wife Isabel in 1907; Reed's nephew Alexander Wyclif Reed joined the firm in 1925. It was a New Zealand literature specialist and general titles publisher, releasing over 100 titles a year including a number of significant New Zealand authors such as Barry Crump, Janet Frame and Witi Ihimaera.

== History ==
The Reed firm was founded in Dunedin, New Zealand, in 1907 by Alfred Hamish Reed and his wife Isabel as a mail-order Sunday school supply business that became called Sunday School Supply Stores. In 1925, Reed's nephew Alexander Wyclif (Clif) Reed joined the firm. In 1932, Clif opened a branch in Wellington. Also in 1932 the firm expanded into publishing, an activity that grew quickly, taking advantage of the shortage of imported books during World War II. In 1934 the firm, called A. H. Reed, adopted the imprint A. H. & A. W. Reed. In 1941 the firm became a limited liability company as A. H. Reed Ltd.

In the 1950s and 1960s, A. H. & A. W. Reed issued a number of bestsellers, including books by Barry Crump, and became New Zealand's foremost educational publisher. In the late 1960s the firm was the largest publisher in Australasia and changed its name to A. H. & A. W. Reed Ltd. In the 1970s Reed had its head office in Wellington and branches in Auckland, Christchurch, Sydney, and London. The firm published many popular non-fiction books that "celebrated a distinctly New Zealand way of life", including works in the fields of "back-country tales, books on sport, gardening, cooking and crafts" and illustrated books of "natural history and books of landscape photographs and painting". Books on Māori topics were one of Reed's specialities.

In the 1970s, the firm faced growing problems of shrinking markets and increased competition. It was sold to Associated Book Publishers (ABP) in 1983 and, with Methuen Publishing also part of ABP, became "Reed Methuen". In 1987 it became Octopus Publishing (NZ) and published under the Heinemann Reed imprint from 1988. In 1992 British firm Reed International (UK) took over Octopus and the New Zealand company was renamed "Reed Publishing (NZ) Ltd". In 2006 it won the Thorpe Bowker Award for Outstanding Achievement in New Zealand Book Publishing. In 2007 it changed its name to "Raupo Publishing (NZ)", raupo being the Māori for bulrush (Typha orientalis), a type of reed. It is currently an imprint of the Penguin Group.

== Book series ==
Book series published by Reed included:

- Know Your Garden Series
- Mobil New Zealand Nature Series
- New Zealand Art Series
- New Zealand Profile Series
- Pacific Writers Series
- Pageant of the Pacific
- Raupo Books
- Reed Practical Gardening Series
- Reeds Colourbook Series
- Reedway Cookbook
- The Silver Fern Series

== Kiwi Pacific Records and Hibiscus Records ==
In 1957 A.H. & A.W. Reed began producing records "to support the company's Maori language, physical education and folk-dancing school texts". This division of Reed became known as "Kiwi Pacific Records International Limited" and is no longer part of the former company.

Hibiscus Records is a division of Kiwi Pacific Records International and has many Polynesia and Maori titles on CD, specialised in mainly authentic Polynesian music. Many Maori and Pacific Island recordings were released via Kiwi Pacific Records International in Hastings, New Zealand. Many of the recordings were produced and recorded by author James Siers. An example of James Siers work is Bora Bora – Island of Dreams by the Hotel Bora Bora Entertainers, released on Hibiscus HLS-22.

Other authentic recordings are Western Samoa Festival Performers, The Festival Music From Western Samoa released on Hibiscus HLS-72 in 1976, and Western Samoa Teachers Training College – Samoa Song And Rhythm Hibiscus TC HLS-24 in 1972.

=== Selected releases ===
EP

- The Beachcombers, Songs For Beachcombers – Hibiscus Records HE.5
- Jerome Grey, Jerome Grey at the Intercontinental, Songs of Samoa – Hibiscus Records HE.6

LP

"Adventures in Sound" Series, HLS-1 – HLS-6

- Hibiscus HLS-1 – Cawaci-Loreto Combined Choirs – Echoes of the Islands
- Hibiscus HLS-2 – Navuavu Village Entertainers – Fiji – Isles of Enchantment
- Hibiscus HLS-3 – Ann's Betela Dancers and Drummers, Johnny and Alice Vahua, etc. – Rarotonga Festival
- Hibiscus HLS-4 – Tongan Entertainers, Queen Salote College Choir, Tui Mala Group – Destination Tonga
- Hibiscus HLS-5 – Voqa Kei Turaki – The Lure Of Fiji
- Hibiscus HLS-6 – The Girls Of Matautu – Samoa Sings
- Hibiscus HLS-11 – Talofa Village Entertainers – The Best Of Samoa
- Hibiscus HLS-12 – Tradewinds Boys at the Tradewinds Hotel, Bay Of Islands, Suva – Where The Tradewinds Blow
- Hibiscus HLS-15 – Nawaka Village Entertainers – Meke Fiji
- Hibiscus HLS-18 – Fiji Police Band – Pacific Brass
- Hibiscus HLS-20 – The Fijians – The Rhythm Of Fiji
- Hibiscus HLS-21 – Western Samoa Teachers Training College – Samoa I Sisifo
- Hibiscus HLS-26 – Choir of the Western Samoa Teachers Training college – Samoan Songs of Worship
- Hibiscus HLS-34 – The Beachcombers – Songs From A Paradise Isle
- Hibiscus HLS-43 – Music From Rakavono A Fijian Folk Opera for Children, Presentation and performance by pupils and staff of Levuka Public School, Hibiscus (1972)
- Hibiscus HLS-87 – The Five Stars – Fetu e Lima (1981)
- Hibiscus HLS-49 – The Gilbert & Ellice Festival Company – Te Bino/TeTinere/Te Kawawa/Te Kamei/TeBuki/Ellice Fatele(1972)
- Hibiscus HLS-72 – Unknown – Festival Music From Western Samoa
