= Barbara Brooke (art dealer) =

New Zealand art dealer and gallery owner

- Born: Elsie Barbara Brown; 23 March 1925; Christchurch
- Died: 21 March 1980 (aged 54)
- Occupation: Art dealer
- Years active: 1959–1980
- Known for: Gallery 91, Ascent magazine and Brooke Gifford Gallery
- Partner: André Brooke

Barbara Brooke (23 March 1925 – 21 March 1980) was a contemporary art dealer and partner in Gallery 91 and the Brooke Gifford Gallery in Christchurch. She was also the co-founder and co-editor of the art magazine Ascent from 1967 to 1969 and a key supporter and advocate for contemporary art and craft in New Zealand.

== Life and art career ==
Elsie Barbara Brooke was born in Christchurch, New Zealand, the daughter of Alexander and Mary Anne Brown. In 1945, she married André Brooke, an artist who had emigrated to New Zealand from Hungary. In the 1960s she began to be known as Barbara Brooke.

=== Gallery 91 ===
In 1959, the Brookes opened what would be the third contemporary art gallery in New Zealand. Gallery 91 was located at 91A Cashel Street and for almost a year became a centre for contemporary art in Christchurch. Along with exhibitions, the Gallery 91 exhibition programme included discussions, demonstrations and poetry evenings. To cater for these activities the Gallery's hours were long: 9.30 am – 5.30 pm and 7pm – 11pm on weekdays and on Saturday from 7 pm – 11 pm. Home and Building magazine described the gallery as, “a stylish, large and open exhibition space, Gallery 91 seemed to declare that New Zealand art was something of value and that its practitioners should be respected. The emphasis was on younger artists and the programme included loan exhibitions from the Auckland City Art Gallery including Contemporary New Zealand Drawings.

Among the many exhibitions shown, one stands out: the largest exhibition of Colin McCahon's paintings shown up to that time in Christchurch. Art critic and McCahon biographer Peter Simpson has named it, ‘the most remarkable exhibition of new paintings McCahon ever held’. Christchurch City Librarian and art collector Ron O’Reilly started a campaign to buy the painting Tomorrow will be the same but not as this is to gift to the Robert McDougall Art Gallery. This first attempt failed but the idea was successfully revived three years later. Lack of sustained sales forced the Brookes to close Gallery 91 after ten months.

=== Canterbury Society of Arts ===
In January 1960, André and Barbara Brooke were jointly appointed as Secretary Manager of the Canterbury Society of Arts. The reaction from the artworld was enthusiastic, “one-man shows and other exhibitions by small groups of artists will inevitably result in a change of emphasis”. The couple brought to the CSA's Canterbury Society of Arts Durham Street premises a range of younger artists and initiated high-profile exhibitions such as the Hay's Limited Art Competition (later known as the Hay's Art Prize). André Brooke resigned from the position in 1963 and Barbara was appointed as the sole Secretary Manager of the Canterbury Society of Arts. She remained in the job for the next two years with early work on planning for the construction of a new building for the CSA.

=== Caxton Press and Ascent ===
After leaving the CSA, in 1966 Barbara Brooke was employed part-time at Caxton Press to edit the New Zealand Local Government Magazine. The following year, at the suggestion of the Queen Elizabeth II Arts Council, Leo Bensemann and Brooke started up a new magazine for contemporary art, Ascent. For the first two issues Brooke is listed as ‘assistant editor’ but by issue three she is noted as co-editor alongside Bensemann. Ross Fraser reviewed the first issue in Landfall. Push the writers “extend” them with critical writers who also provide feedback – positive or otherwise – to our artists. Five issues of Ascent were published before it closed in 1969. The following October Barbara Brooke and André Brooke were divorced and he left New Zealand to live in Tahiti.

=== Mollet Street Market ===
In 1972, Brooke helped open Christchurch's first craft market with Judy Gifford and others. The Mollet Street Market was located at 601B Colombo Street and described itself as a ‘craft-display workshop with gear on sale to the public.’ The success of the market was over-shadowed when the Retail Shop Assistants’ Union took Brooke and her co-workers to court on the grounds of staff having to work in the week-ends” Brooke helped start a partition to allow the market to continue and eventually managed win an exemption via the courts. Brooke also demonstrated her engagement in local politics when she stood for and was appointed to the Christchurch Transport Board where she served from 1975 to 1978.

=== Brooke Gifford Gallery ===
Brooke's return to the contemporary art dealer business came in 1975 when she and her friend Judith Gifford opened the Brooke Gifford Gallery at 112 Manchester Street. Art gallery director and critic John Coley described the enterprise as, 'a brave venture with more than a touch of missionary idealism about it.' One of the first exhibitions was in co-operation with Barry Lett Galleries in Auckland and included Ralph Hotere and Patrick Hanly. Many of the exhibitions during Brooke's time at the gallery demonstrated her determination to bring the latest of contemporary art practice to Christchurch. A significant example was a 1979 Billy Apple exhibition in which the work consisted of renovating the gallery's print room and then curating the first exhibition in the renovated space. The Christchurch artist Neil Dawson would have his first solo exhibition House Alterations in the gallery in 1978.

After five years working at the gallery Brooke became ill and died in March 1980.

== Essential reading ==
Petrena Fishburn Barbara Brooke: A Trend-Setting Art Professional in New Zealand 1959-1980. This thesis submitted in fulfilment of the requirement for the Degree of Master of Arts in Art History at the University of Canterbury 2014. Fishburn's thesis covers all aspects of Brooke's working career in detail. You can download it here.
