= James Coe =

New Zealand artist and designer (1917–2003)

James Coe QSO
- James Coe, 1997
- Born: Herbert James Bowkett Coe; 26 September 1917; Timaru
- Died: 17 December 2003 (aged 86); Waikanae
- Occupation: Industrial designer
- Known for: Design education

Herbert James Bowkett Coe QSO (26 September 1917 – 17 December 2003) was a New Zealand artist, art teacher, industrial designer and early champion of ergonomic design.

== Biography ==
Coe was born in Timaru in 1917. He attended the Canterbury College of Fine Art until his art studies were interrupted by World War II and war service in the Pacific.

On the outbreak of World War II he resigned his commission in the Wellington West Coast Regiment to join the infantry training cadre, and also served with the Intelligence Department at Army Headquarters. Assigned to Fiji in 1940, he carried out map and survey work. Coe was promoted to Regimental Sergeant Major on the staff of the Commander of the Royal Engineers. Commissioned with the rank of Second Lieutenant in 1942, he was posted to 30th Battalion, 3rd Division, 2NZEF. His primary military service was in the Solomon Islands, where he commanded a platoon in C Company. On his return from that tour, he was appointed Intelligence Officer at Intelligence School.

Coe continued with his art during his service and often sketched portraits of soldiers for them to send home to their families and friends. His war service formed the subject of four paintings held in the New Zealand National Collection of War Art, which were painted after his return to New Zealand in 1945. Two of these were purchased for the Exhibition of Official War Paintings by New Zealand Artists in 1952. The other two were donated to Archives New Zealand by Coe in 1995.

After the war, he was seconded to the Department of Education to establish an art scheme for secondary schools. He set up the pilot programme at Hutt Valley High School in Hutt Valley, Wellington and was then recruited to become the head of the Hutt Valley High School art department from 1945 to 1959.

In 1959 Coe took up the position of art school director at Wellington Technical College and in the following years helped to establish and lead the new School of Design as part of Wellington Polytechnic. He developed a keen interest in anatomy and anatomical drawing which led to a passion for ergonomics. From 1962 he was the head of the Wellington Polytechnic School of Design, and educated design students in New Zealand about the science of ergonomics. He established a laboratory at the school for testing, measuring and recording data. In 1983 he was appointed to a teaching position in ergonomics at Royal Melbourne Institute of Technology in Melbourne.

Coe died on 17 December 2003.

The New Zealand Prime Minister, Helen Clark, opened the James Coe Centre (a suite of public meeting and exhibition and function spaces at TheNewDowse, an art & design museum in Lower Hutt, New Zealand) in February 2007, as part of the museum's refurbishment.

== Past pupils ==
Past pupils include:

- John Bevan Ford (artist)
- Bill Alington (architect)

== Honours and awards ==
In the 1981 Queen's Birthday Honours, Coe was appointed a Companion of the Queen's Service Order for public services.

In 1997, he received the John Britten Award from the Designers Institute of New Zealand. This award is the highest recognition given by DINZ to an outstanding individual for leadership, vision and achievement both in NZ and internationally.
