= The Group (New Zealand art) =

Informal association of NZ artists

The Group was an informal but influential art association formed in Christchurch, New Zealand in 1927. Initially begun by ex-students from Canterbury College of Art, its aim was to provide a freer, more experimental alternative to the academic salon painting exhibitions of the Canterbury Society of Arts. The Group exhibited annually for 50 years, from 1927 to 1977, and it was continuously at the forefront of New Zealand art's avant-garde scene.

Many of the country's best-known artists were associated at some time with The Group. Among these are Colin McCahon, Lois McIver, Doris Lusk, Toss Woollaston, Rita Angus, Olivia Spencer Bower, Leo Bensemann, Rata Lovell-Smith, Philip Trusttum, Quentin Macfarlane, Rosemary Johnson and Douglas MacDiarmid. The influence of The Group extended into other areas of New Zealand culture through the collaborations and friendship of members such as the likes of writer and editor Charles Brasch and composer Douglas Lilburn. Its influence was such that it is occasionally referred to as "Bloomsbury South".

== History ==
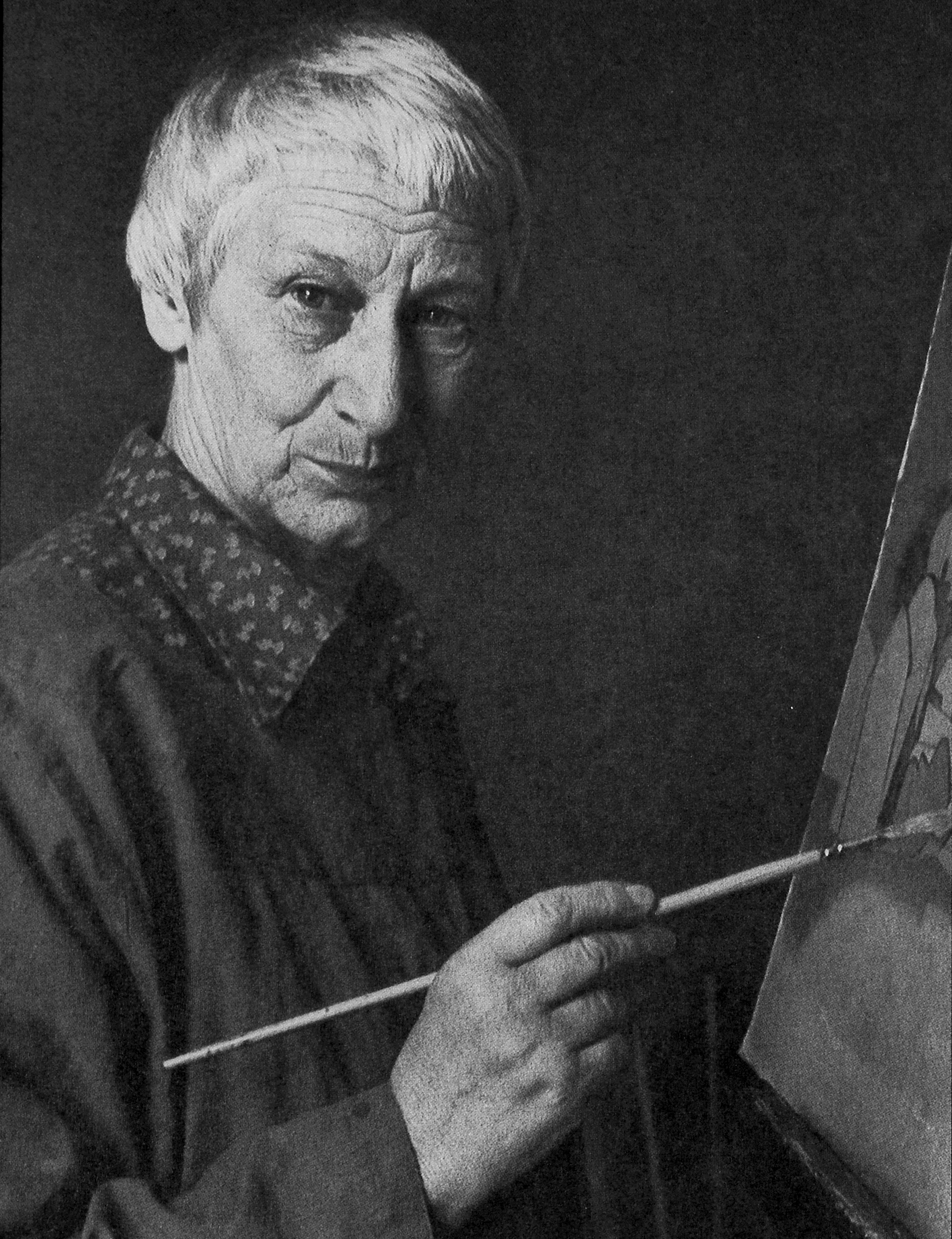
Rita Angus

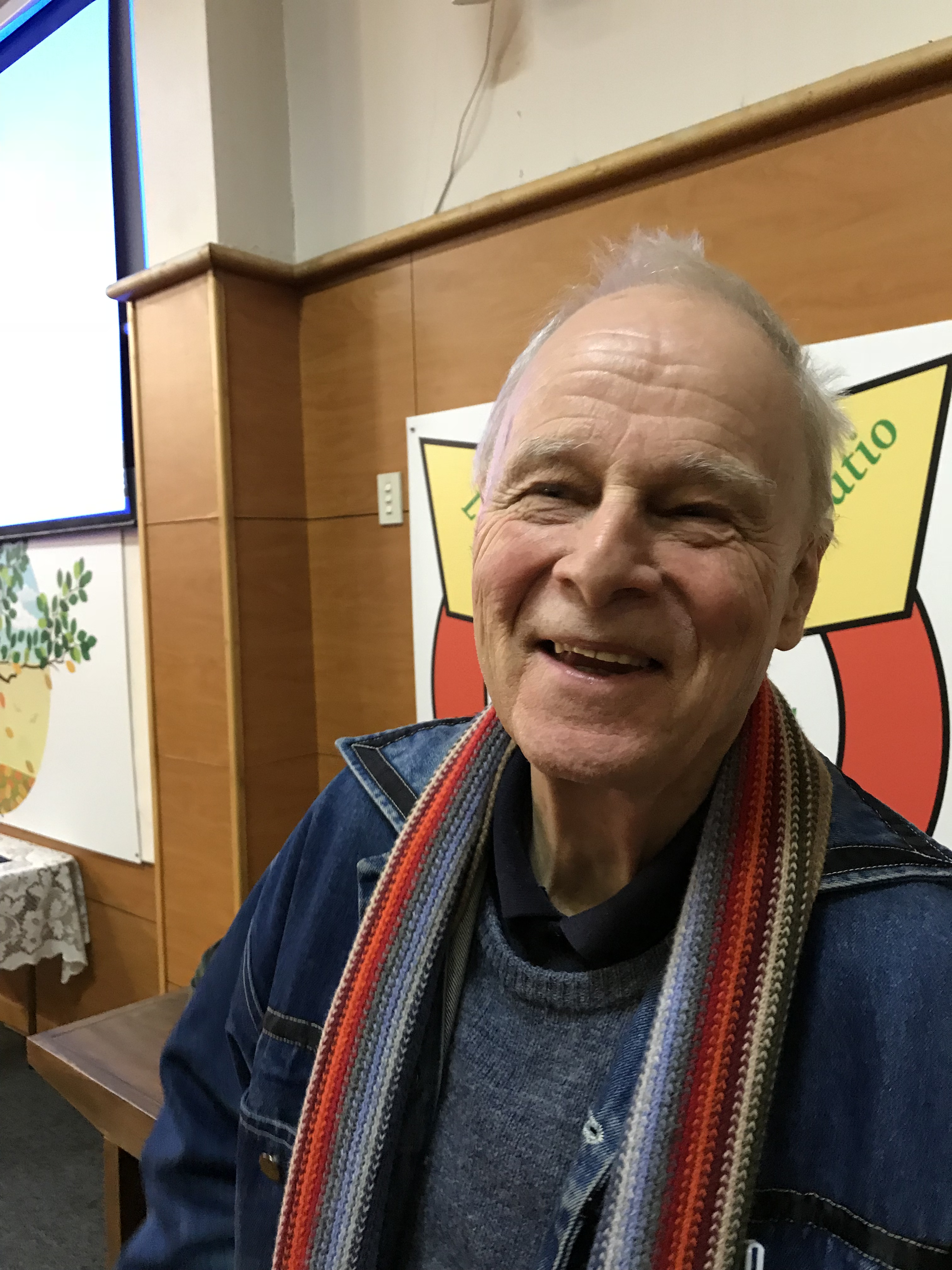
Philip Trusttum

The Group was formed in 1927 by seven young graduates of Canterbury College School of Art to challenge conventional and conservative standards of art by showcasing their artistic works free of influence and administration from a larger body. They were Margaret Anderson (later Frankel), Viola Macmillan Brown, Cora Wilding, William (Billy) Baverstock, Evelyn Polson (later Page), Edith Wall, Ngaio Marsh and William H. Montgomery. Prior to the formation of The Group, artists were to submit their artworks to larger bodies such as Canterbury Society of Arts (CSA) for review and curation before getting approved before selected artworks getting selected to be displayed at exhibitions. The CSA was a large art exhibiting institution at the time with surging membership and high sales.

From its founded year until 1933, it frequently held annual shows in later time of the year in the Durham Street gallery to distinguish from CSA’s annual shows. The Group continuously organised independent shows until it temporarily terminated its exhibition in 1933 or 1934 after the formation of the New Zealand Society of Artists (NZSA). All members of The Group at the time were tempted by the larger scale of NZSA, hence their decisions of leaving Group to join NZSA. However, members of The Group who left to join NZSA then withdrew their membership with NZSA as they were displeased with having to submit their artworks to bigger group. The Group later on organised its largest-ever exhibition in 1935 with the contribution of fourteen artists, including Rata Lovell-Smith and Louise Henderson, two major contributors to the Canterbury landscape painting style.

Despite the attempt to create a more balanced atmosphere, The Group had experienced some internal conflicts as some members attempted to turn Group into a weapon against its competitors while some other members wanted to limit the number of memberships available instead of expanding by branching out.

== Theme ==
Unlike showcased artworks at exhibitions held by other art groups in New Zealand at the time, which were usually chosen by those group’s committees, artworks displayed at exhibitions of The Group were curated by artists who had their works displayed at the upcoming exhibition.

Though the operation was unconventional during its time, members of The Group respected their traditional and conservative education they received in art school.

== Members ==
During its time, The Group had some notable names within New Zealand’s contemporary art scene joined as its members. Members of The Group were dominated by female artists except in 1932.

James Cook joined in 1931and exhibited with The Group in 1931 and 1932.

Rita Angus joined The Group in 1932. During her membership, she contributed fifteen works to the 1938 show. Angus has been a well-known name within the contemporary art scene of New Zealand, hence her membership boosted the reputation of The Group. She also introduced some artists such as Bensemann to become a member of The Group.

Leo Bensemann was a mainly self-taught artist as he, the son of a German blacksmith, grew up in an underprivileged rural environment. He withdrew his membership with CSA, where his works were exhibited during 1935 to 1938, to join The Group in 1938 after moving to Christchurch to pursue his with his membership being proposed by Rita Angus. The shared house of Bensemann, Rita Angus, and Lawrence Baigent was the informal headquarters and regular meeting spot of The Group. His art expression and style revolutionised the art scene of Christchurch as a result of his membership – free of influence from traditional methods that were taught in art school. Bensemann style focused on portraitures and graphic media, distinguishing himself from most The Group’s artists whose predominated subject is landscape.

Coming from rather similar background with Bensemann, Toss Wollaston became member of The Group in 1936. His style was similar to Bensemann’s in free and radical mindsets as they shared the same mentor. Wollaston shared the same apartment with Angus and Bensemann for some time.

Rata Lovell-Smith was a regular contributor to CSA in the 1920s until she left the institution for The Group. Her style mainly depicts landscape with poster-like colour palettes.

Olivia Spencer Bower was born in England. She graduated Canterbury College School of Art and started having her works showed with The Group from 1936. Preferred medium was using watercolour to depict landscape and figure subjects.

== Exhibitions ==
Throughout its operating period, The Group had organised its annual exhibition at the Durham Street Gallery, except for in 1933 and 1934 due to its temporary fall-out caused by the formation of NZSA. Many of Group's exhibitions displayed landscape and portraiture artworks as they were the dominated subjects of Group’s artists.

== Public responses ==
The Group received positive responses from the critics during its time being under review. They mainly spoke highly of The Group on its unique way of art exhibiting, which differentiates itself from other existing art institutions. However, there are opinions saying that Group’s lack of distinctive unity decreased its influence on New Zealand’s contemporary art scene.

Though being a competitor with The Group, James Shelley, NZSA’s first president, spoke highly of The Group as he admired their self-management and the freedom it gave its artists to fully express themselves via their artworks. He delivered opening speeches at Group’s 1929 and 1932 exhibitions.
