= Hutt Valley High School =

School in Wellington region, New Zealand

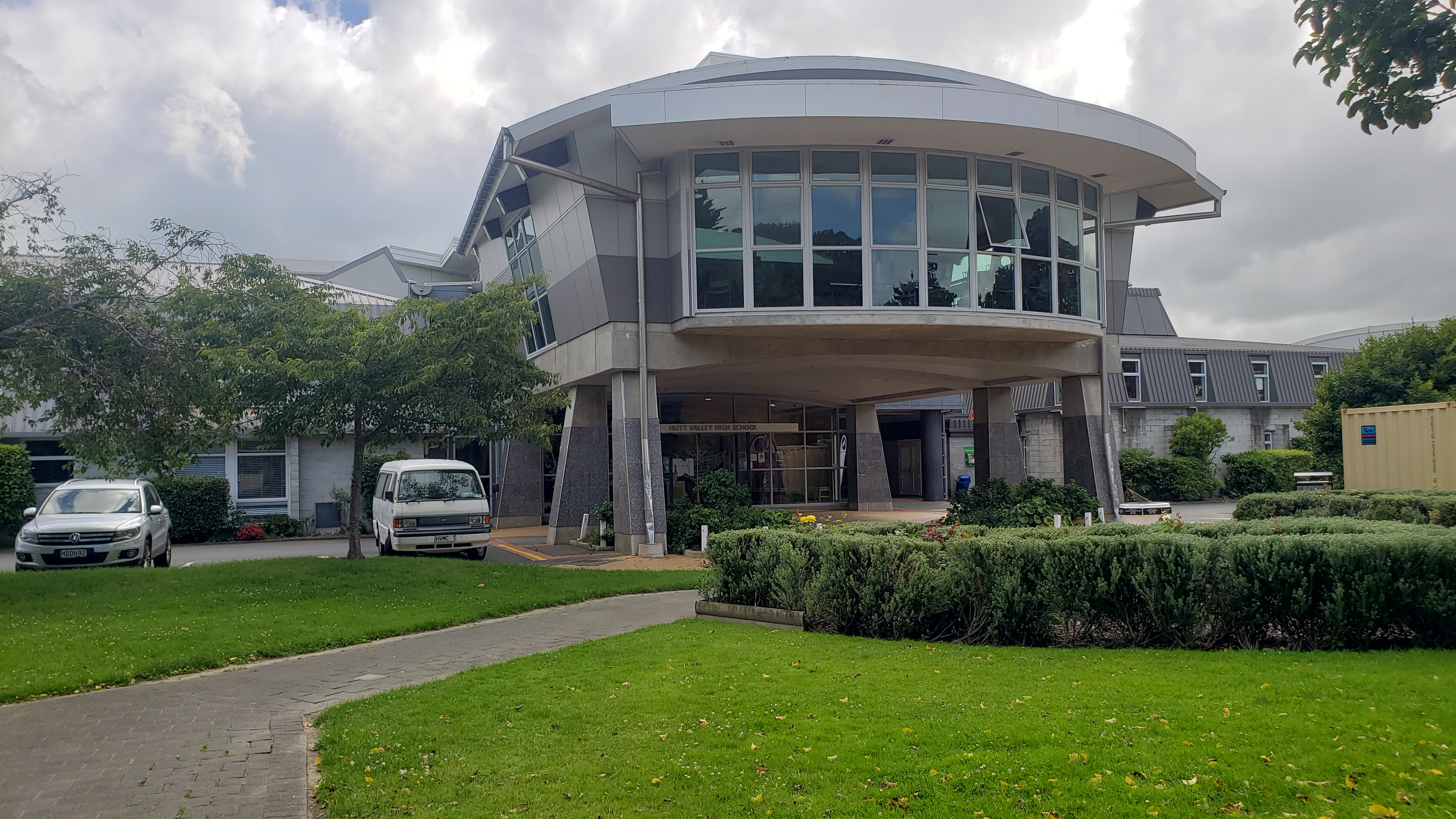

Location
- Woburn Road; Lower Hutt 5010; New Zealand; 41°12′58″S 174°54′5″E

Information
- Funding type: state
- Motto: Ad Alta (To the highest)
- Established: 1926
- Ministry of Education Institution no.: 261
- Principal: Denise Johnson
- Years offered: 9–13
- Gender: co-educational
- Enrolment: 1,989 (August 2015)
- Socio-economic decile: 8P
- Website: www.hvhs.school.nz

Hutt Valley High School is a state coeducational secondary school located in central Lower Hutt, New Zealand. A total of 1,989 students from Years 9 to 13 (ages 12 to 18) attend the school as of July 2026, making the school one of the largest in the Wellington metropolitan area.

== School ==
Hutt Valley High has a widely varied curriculum, offering many languages, sciences and almost the entire spectrum of the National Curriculum. In addition to the school's subjects, there is a wide number of extracurricular events and groups to join and participate in. The school offers organisation bodies such as the Councils (serving Years 9 – 13), the Cultural Committee and the Sports Committee. A large number of interest related groups are offered: academic clubs and societies such as Chess Club, Debating, EPro8 Challenge, Homework Club, Maths Help Club, Philosophy and Science Technicians; Cultural Clubs such as HVHS Fusion, Kapa haka, K-Pop Club, Kiwi Club, Origami Club, Poly Club and Spanish and Latin American Club; Social Clubs such as Anime and Manga Club, Board Games Club, Cornerstone Christian Group, Dungeons and Dragons, Embroidery Club, Emergency Support Crew, Green Fingers Horticultural Club and Queer Straight Alliance.

The school has a history in the realm of the Arts. Public Speech Making Competitions and the regional Debating Society are two of the events majorly associated with the school's tradition in Public Speaking. Drama productions and Musicals have been a long-standing event since 1926, ranging from 'Oklahoma' and 'Oh, It's a Lovely War' "don the Roof" in 2007. Recently, the schools Stage Challenge Troupe won the Second Night of the Wellington Round of Stage Challenge, with their humorous look at what happens when you get locked in a shopping mall after closing time – Receiving 1st place and 13 awards. The popular Multi-Cultural Evening, where food and entertainment from different cultures are sampled and celebrated, has become an annual event being run by the Cultural Committee.

A wide range of sporting pursuits are part of the school's tradition and success continues in local and national competitions. Many old boys and girls have gone on to represent New Zealand in their chosen code. The local Tararua mountains have been explored by many groups from the school as part of the Tramping Club and the Duke of Edinburgh's Award. In the 1940s, a teacher died in a snowstorm, and several other students have since lost their lives in these mountains.

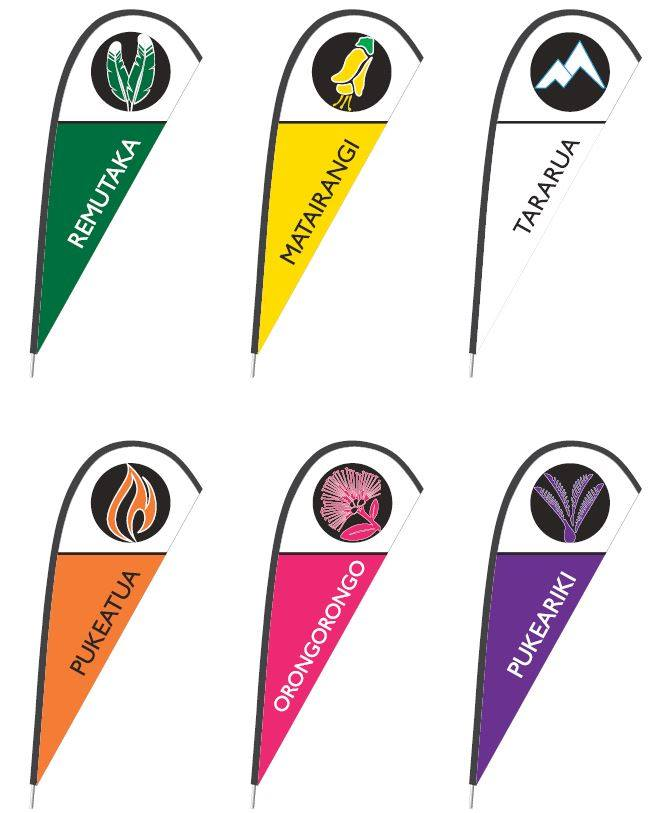
The new flags for the houses (August 2017)

Hutt Valley High School built two new facilities catering to Physical Education, Art and Drama. With the 2009 Government Grant to re-vamp school grounds, Hutt High took to earthquake strengthening the Language and Technology Block (otherwise known as D Block by Students). Currently the same renovations are taking place on the Mathematics and Science section of B Block, with the original 1920s section (which houses the Social Sciences, Computing and Graphics departments) is set to receive similar renovations later this year.

Like many other schools in New Zealand, Hutt Valley High School has a house system. There are 6 houses, formerly known as green, yellow, white, orange, pink and purple. These names were changed in 2017 to Remutaka, Matairangi, Tararua, Pukeatua, Orongorongo and Pukeariki respectively. These are named after regions near the school and the Hutt Valley in general.

== History ==
The origins of the school are in Petone, near Lower Hutt. In 1905, a secondary school, Petone District High School was added to Petone (primary) School which served a growing population employed in the Gear Meat Works and Railway Workshops. Lower Hutt School, in Alicetown, became the Hutt District High School between 1912 and 1925. From 1910, urban growth encouraged citizens to lobby the council for a local school. 18 acres (73,000 m^{2}) of land was bought in 1915 and in 1926, the school moved to its current site on Woburn Rd, as an amalgamation of Petone District High School and Hutt District High School. As the new buildings were not completed, the 164 foundation pupils were initially accommodated at Petone Technical School. By 1928, construction was completed and the roll had grown to 294.

The first principal was H. P. Kidson and the school had nine classrooms and one laboratory. The school felt rural with sheep grazing the land, loaned by local farmers. The first caretaker, Mr. H. J. M. Stirling, died while in the school's employ, and a sundial for his memorial was unveiled by the then Prime Minister and local MP for Lower Hutt, Walter Nash. This sundial is maintained as a memorial to those students who had died during their time at the school. The school's first Rhodes Scholarship was awarded to David Vere-Jones in 1957, who had been Dux in 1953. He represents the school's reputation for scholarship and the many academic honours that past pupils have been awarded over its history.

In the 1930s, girls were expected 'by voluntary labour, to keep the flower beds in order' and boys planted trees and had the opportunity to join the Cadet Company, which involved rifle drill parades and provided the guard of honour at the opening of the nearby Riddiford Baths. The 1940s saw the building of air-raid shelters in the grounds and the effects of polio outbreaks with the early closure of the school for the year in 1947. After the closure of the Petone Memorial College in 1998, its pupils were incorporated into Hutt Valley High School, which greatly increased the roll.

In 2021 the Stachybotrys chartarum (black) mould was discovered in the school during roof renovations. This led to an entire block of classrooms being demolished in 2022.

=== Bullying and violence ===
The school was highly criticised by the news media, parents and the public in 2007 when acting principal Steve Chapman did not expel or suspend five students accused of forcibly lowering the underpants of a 14-year-old student and violating him with an object on 6 December 2007. Chapman justified his decision to simply stand down the students, because it was not a violent act. The local police however, labelled the incident as extreme bullying.

Board chairwoman Susan Pilbrow's response brought the school's safety into further question. Pilbrow is reported as saying that a series of assaults preceding the main attack were minor, and did not warrant being referred to the board, even though scissors and cell phones were being used as weapons and they were regarded as serious violent and sexual assaults by authorities.

Chris Carter, then Minister of Education, asked for an urgent special review by the Education Review Office (ERO) into allegations of underage sex, drinking and drug-taking at the school. The ERO report found that there was no evidence of ongoing serious problems apart from the December incidents. However, the report found that while the school had clear expectations of its students' behaviour, there was "a lack of clear procedures in dealing with incidents" (particularly complaint and investigation of the abuse) and that some management policies needed updating.

Parents were incensed at the response from the school and complained to the offices of the Ombudsman and Human Rights Commission.

In September 2011 the Chief Ombudsman released a comprehensive and highly critical report finding that the school had a systematic culture of bullying and violence and that discipline systems were inadequate and recommended the implementation of mandatory anti-bullying programmes in all schools.

== Enrolment ==
At the June 2012 Education Review Office (ERO) review of the school, Hutt Valley High School had 1609 students, including 43 international students. The school roll had a highly skewed gender composition for a coeducational state school: 56% of students were male and only 44% were female. The ethnic composition was 59% New Zealand European (Pākehā), 16% Asian, 15% Māori, 7% Pasifika and 3% Other.

As of 2026, Hutt Valley High School has an Equity Index of 421, placing it amongst schools whose students have few socioeconomic barriers to achievement (roughly equivalent to deciles 8 and 9 under the former socio-economic decile system).

== Notable alumni ==
- Bill Alington – architect
- Dylan Andrews – professional mixed martial artist who fought in the Welterweight in Absolute Championship Akhmat and middleweight in the Ultimate Fighting Championship
- James Bannatyne – footballer, All Whites
- Philippa Campbell – film and television producer, theatre development executive
- Janet Davidson – archaeologist and museum curator
- Thomas Eichelbaum – former Chief Justice of New Zealand
- Ross Filipo – former All Black
- Kerry Fox – actor
- Catherine Healy – sex workers' rights activist
- Allan Hewson – former All Black
- Ron Jarden – former All Black and Sportsman of the Year, 1951
- Lloyd Jones – author
- Shona Laing – singer and composer
- Alan MacDiarmid – Nobel Prize laureate
- Quentin Macfarlane – Marine painter
- Rob McKay – Geologist at Victoria University of Wellington
- John Money – Psychologist and sexologist, known for his work on gender identity and the controversial sex reassignment of David Reimer
- Chris Nevin – cricketer, Blackcap and Wellington Firebirds captain
- Jason O'Halloran – former All Black, Hurricanes and Wellington Lion
- David Penman – Anglican Archbishop of Melbourne
- John Richard Reid – former New Zealand cricket captain
- Helene Ritchie – former politician
- Warren Tate – biochemist
- Jeremy Thrush – All Black, Hurricanes and former Wellington Lions
- Reginald Uren – architect
- Holly Walker – politician, Member of Parliament (Green, list, 2011–2014)
- Nick Willis – Olympic Silver Medallist, middle-distance runner
- Damien Wilkins – author and director of Victoria University of Wellington's International Institute of Modern Letters
- Jonathan Wyatt – multiple world mountain running champion
