= Joanna Braithwaite =

New Zealand artist

Joanna Braithwaite (born 1962) is a New Zealand painter. Braithwaite has been interested in exploring exchanges between people and animals since studying at the School of Fine Arts, in Canterbury in the mid-1980s. She has said her work has always tended toward the autobiographical, so what is happening in her environment creeps into the work.

== Life ==
Braithwaite was born in Halifax, England, in 1962 and immigrated to New Zealand with her family in 1965. She grew up in the township of Pleasant Point in rural south Canterbury. Since the mid-1990s, when Braithwaite spent two years living in Melbourne, she has exhibited regularly in Australia as well as New Zealand. She returned to Australia in 1999 and continue to live and work in Sydney.

== Art ==
Braithwaite has been described as a "realist, though of an edgy an sceptical sort. Braithwaite's eloquently phrased paintings occupy that point where the traditions of animal painting and Vanitas painting intersect." A painting of a slaughtered sheep's head she exhibited in 1991 epitomised New Zealand: "our farming and agricultural history, the idea of imperialism, the Christian symbolism of it and the distaste so many have for the display of powerful and raw emotion."

Braithwaite's work has seven times been a finalist in the Sulman Prize and four times in the Archibald Prize, in 2018 with her portrait of businessman, art collector and philanthropist Pat Corrigan and most recently in 2022 with McManusstan, her portrait of trade union leader Sally McManus.

== Education, awards and residencies ==
Braithwaite is a graduate of the Canterbury School of Fine Arts in Christchurch, where she received a BFA in 1985, and of the College of Fine Arts Sydney, where she received an MFA in 2000.

- 2019 Ravenswood Australian Women's Art Prize
- 1998 Art Excellence Award from the Christchurch Community Trust
- 1997 and 1998 Merit Awards in the Visa Gold Art Awards
- 1991 Molly Morpeth Canaday Art Award, New Zealand
- 1990 Olivia Spencer Bower Foundation Art Award, New Zealand
- 1986 Major Project Award, QEII Arts Council
- 1983 Ethel Rose Overton Scholarship (University of Canterbury)
- 1983 Sawtell Turner Painting Prize (University of Canterbury)
