= Canterbury Society of Arts Gallery =

Art gallery in Christchurch, New Zealand

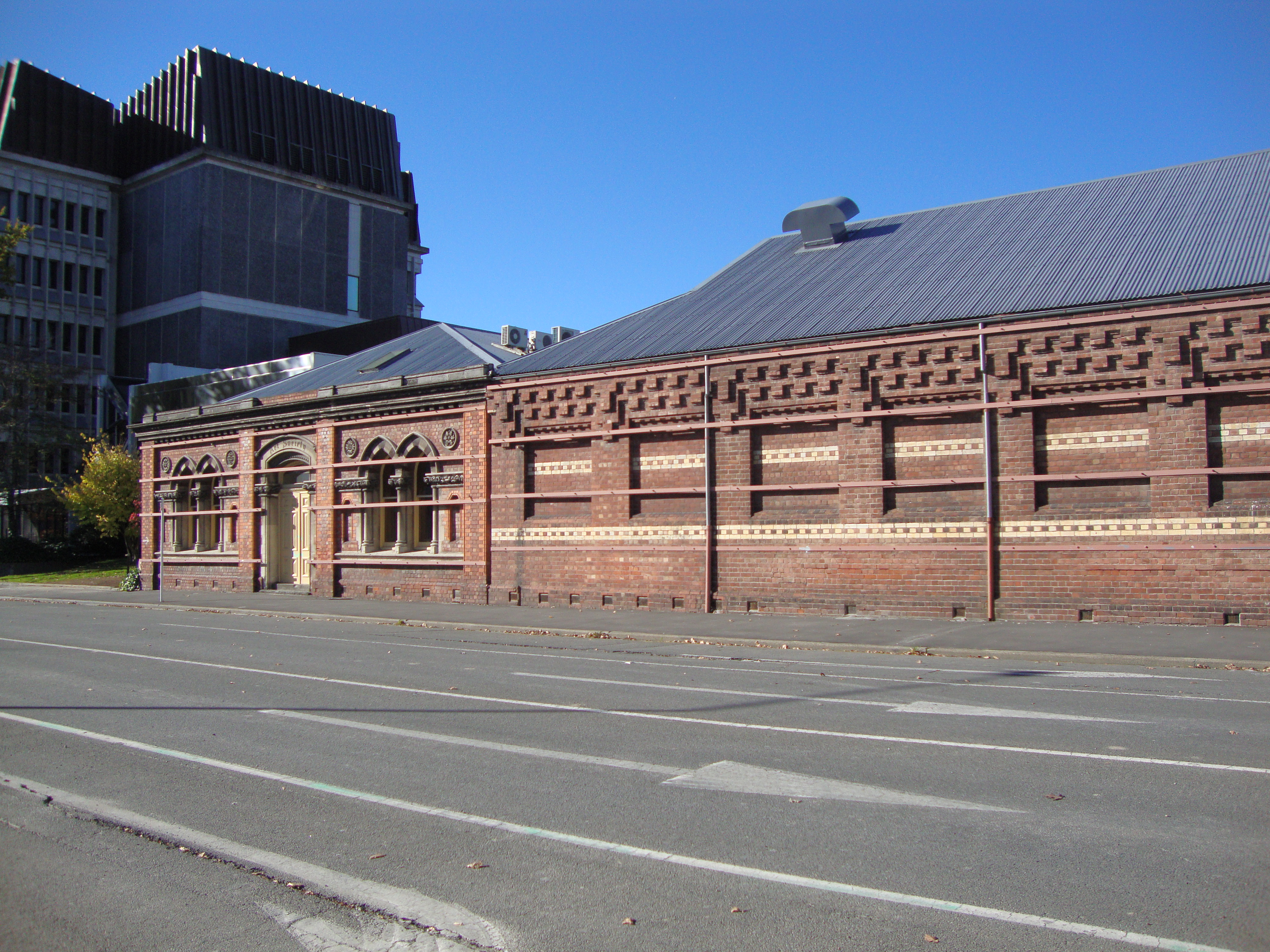
- Interactive map of the Canterbury Society of Arts Gallery area

General information
- Type: Art Gallery
- Architectural style: Gothic revival
- Location: Christchurch Central City, Armagh St
- Coordinates: 43°31′43″S 172°38′02″E
- Completed: 1890, 1894
- Renovated: 1972, c.1980
- Demolished: 2012
- Cost: £1,229
- Client: Canterbury Society of Arts (CSA)

Technical details
- Structural system: brick masonry

Design and construction
- Architects: Benjamin Mountfort & Richard Harman

The Canterbury Society of Arts Gallery, was an art gallery in the central city of Christchurch, New Zealand. It consisted of two buildings built in the late 1800s. The buildings were demolished in 2012 due to damage from the Canterbury earthquakes.

Benjamin Mountfort designed the first building in 1890, costing a total of £1,229. It consisted of a large gallery, and some smaller rooms, one that was meant for use as a library. A second building, designed by Richard Harman was completed in 1894.

In 1968 the Canterbury Society of Arts gallery moved to larger premises at 66 Gloucester Street and in 1996, was rebranded CoCA Centre of Contemporary Art, the name it is known by today.

== Demolition ==
The Ministry of Justice was the tenant of the building during the Canterbury earthquakes of 2010 and 2011. They deemed it too expensive to repair the building and the move to demolish the building was backed by building owners Ngāi Tahu. The Canterbury Earthquake Recovery Authority supported the action citing the old gallery as an earthquake risk.

The New Zealand Historic Places Trust (now Heritage New Zealand) had previously assessed the building and found it largely undamaged.
