= Trevor Moffitt =

New Zealand painter (1936–2006)

- Born: Gilbert Trevor Moffitt; 15 August 1936; Gore, New Zealand
- Died: 4 April 2006 (aged 69); Christchurch, New Zealand

Gilbert Trevor Moffitt (15 August 1936 – 4 April 2006) was a New Zealand artist, arguably one of the country's leading narrative painters. Moffitt's expressionist paintings reveal the lives and stories of ordinary working New Zealanders.

== Life ==
Moffitt grew up in the gold mining township of Waikaia, in Southland. His family was a poor rural family, where of necessity a hunter-gatherer mentality prevailed. Moffitt's father Bert was a casual rural labourer, but by the mid-1940s, within a decade of Trevor's birth, the writing was on the wall for such roles.

"The moment concrete posts came in, header harvesters came in, machine shearing came in, [my father] couldn't change or adapt or somehow be part of that. So what had been there for years and years on a seasonal basis just disappeared in a year or two".

Moffitt's relationship with his father was strained when he refused to leave school and his father didn't speak to him for many years, leaving him to finance his schooling, clothing and other necessities. Married and had children. Trevor Moffitt supported his family as a secondary school art teacher, eventually heading the large art department at Burnside High School in Christchurch. He resigned from teaching in the 1980s, to focus on his painting. He died in 2006.

== Education ==
Trevor Moffitt initially studied art at the Southland Technical College supported by his father. His father reluctantly allowed him study at the school due to its technical focus but expected him to leave school at the age of 15 to become a plumber or carpenter. Trevor stayed on at the Technical College despite his father's wishes and went on to attend the Auckland Teachers Training College. During the 1950s he attended the University of Canterbury School of Fine Art, despite his father's continued opposition, and graduated with a Diploma of Fine Arts with honours in painting in 1959.

== Art ==
One of New Zealand's most respected regional artists, Moffitt was taught by Canterbury artists Bill Sutton and Russell Clark who, along with Rita Angus, searched for a particularly New Zealand style. Moffitt was concerned that New Zealand was being painted from a European perspective and set out to paint "this place" in his own way, where people were as important as the landscape. Unlike many of his contemporaries whose work pursued a nationalism based on the landscape, Moffitt's interests resided in locating the human figure in the land.

Often confrontational in its honesty, his bold, direct expressionist style was considered almost primitive and this led to slow recognition of his talent; Moffit produced figurative and narrative work when all around him were creating international modernism. Simplicity was a feature of Moffit's art and he used his trademark technique of thickly applied impasto paint and solid tonally modelled forms to convey the messages in his paintings.

Moffitt's work is an enduring exploration of issues relevant to New Zealanders. His work focuses on the unique stories and legends of New Zealand history as well as humanist concerns of modern life. He was drawn to the stories of native folklore, with a preference for outsiders or local heroes. Admiring Sidney Nolan's Ned Kelly paintings and he developed numerous series based on such archetypes; typically producing a large number of works for each series.

- Gold Miners

Moffitt's first major series of paintings (started in 1962), were based on his childhood experience of goldminers in Waikaia.

- MacKenzie

Painted in 1964 to 1965 whilst working in Timaru, based on the life of James McKenzie a New Zealand folk hero and drover who was found with some 1000 stolen sheep in 1855.

- Stanley Graham

Painted from 1986; Stanley Graham was a New Zealand mass murderer who killed seven people on 8 October 1941. Trevor Moffitt explained why he chose Stanley Graham as the subject for a series of oil paintings: "I felt an empathy for him. Things were stacked up against him. The narrative was important – how Graham was and how his life got out of control. The lessons of the man are still to be learnt – that lack of communication leads to violence in society."

- Hokonui Moonshine

His last exhibition of paintings, "Hokonui Moonshine Final Works", opened the same night of his death. Hokonui Moonshine was illicit alcohol produced in the Hokonui Hills during the height of New Zealand's Temperance movement.

Other series include

- My Fathers Life
- Solo Father
- Freezing Works
- Canterbury Paddocks
- Southland Series
- Rakaia
- Fields and Paddocks
- Human Condition One, Two and Three

== Legacy ==
Moffitt died at his home in Christchurch on 4 April 2006. While Moffitt's work was admired by his peers, it was only shortly before his death when he began to receive substantial national attention.

Moffitt's work is held in an extensive number of collections, including the Auckland Art Gallery, Anderson Park, The Dowse Art Museum, Dunedin Public Art Gallery, Forrester Gallery, Eastern Southland Art Gallery, Hawke's Bay Museum and Art Gallery, Hocken Collections, James Wallace Charitable Arts Trust, Lincoln University, Manawatu Art Gallery, Christchurch Art Gallery, Rotorua Museum of Art and History, Sarjeant Gallery, Suter Art Gallery, and Museum of New Zealand Te Papa Tongarewa.
