= Hamish Keith =

New Zealand writer and artist

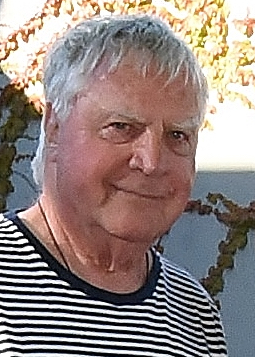
Keith in 2017

Hamish Henry Cordy Keith CNZM OBE (born 15 August 1936) is a New Zealand writer, art curator, arts consultant and social commentator.

== Introduction ==
Keith has been writing about and working with the arts in New Zealand for almost half a century. He has published a number of books on cultural and social history and cooking as well as the arts. He has contributed reviews and comment on the arts and urban and social issues for numerous magazines and newspapers since writing a weekly column of art news and reviews for the Auckland Star from 1962 to 1975. With Gordon H. Brown he wrote the first history of New Zealand art, An Introduction to New Zealand Painting, published by William Collins in 1969. Keith worked at the Auckland Art Gallery from 1958 to 1970, as Student Assistant (1958–61), Assistant Keeper (1961–64), and Keeper of the Gallery (1965–70), before working as a freelance journalist, writer and art consultant.

Keith has been, at times, a controversial figure in the arts. In the 1980s his art history sustained repeated attacks by art historians such as Francis Pound, who criticised An Introduction to New Zealand Painting for its reliance on the 'harsh clarity of New Zealand light' as an explanation for why New Zealand painting followed particular styles. In the early 1990s Keith became embroiled in a public dispute about his role in the National Art Gallery of New Zealand's controversial purchase of two paintings by Charles Goldie. Willing to stand up publicly for his opinions, Keith has played a significant role in the artistic life of New Zealand since the late 1950s.

Keith was both a member of the board that set up the Museum of New Zealand and was also on its interim board He has, however, been a consistent critic of the Museum of New Zealand Te Papa Tongarewa, referring to it as a "theme park", the "cultural equivalent to a fast-food outlet" and "not even a de facto national gallery" but seems to have moderated his opinion more recently when making a case for exhibition space on the Auckland waterfront.

He is married to the costume designer Ngila Dickson.

== Media career ==
Keith has been a regular radio and television broadcaster and worked on the pioneer arts program Review as reporter and director. He made the first television program on New Zealand art, Waterfall to Waterfall in 1962 and in the late 1960s he made a six-part series on New Zealand art for Radio New Zealand. In 1965 he toured the first ever exhibition of contemporary New Zealand art in Australia.

From 1970 to 1976 he hosted the Radio New Zealand weekly interview programme Guest of Honour. In 1982, with Bruce Morrison, he made Profiles, a series of six half-hour documentaries on contemporary New Zealand artists Tony Fomison, Richard Killeen, Neil Dawson, Greer Twiss, Philip Clairmont and Jeffrey Harris.

He wrote four scripts for the pioneering television drama series Pukemanu and was principal writer for Section Seven. In 1984 he wrote and presented the two-hour series Housing New Zealand in the Twentieth Century, and presented two series of Kiwi Shorts.

His most recent project was the arts documentary The Big Picture, directed by Paul Swadel and produced by Fiona Copland of Filmworks, which garnered three nominations at the 2008 New Zealand Screen Awards, and won Best Series and Best Music Awards.

== Arts career ==
Keith completed his Diploma in Fine Arts at the Canterbury School of Fine Art in 1956 and worked briefly at the Christchurch Press before gaining employment at the Auckland City Art Gallery. In 1960 he completed a studentship at the National Gallery of Victoria in Melbourne, followed by a Museums Diploma from the Museums Association of Great Britain in 1964.

In 1967 he toured the United States on a six-month Carnegie Corporation Fellowship. In 1970 he was one of a group who set up the Regional Arts Federations in opposition to the original Arts Council. He served as national president Actors Equity and founding president of the Writers Guild.

Appointed Chairman of the restructured Arts Council from 1975 where he served for six years, board member of the Council of the National Art Gallery, Museum for 14 years and chair of the National Art Gallery for nine. At the arts council he established the Maori and South Pacific council. In 1976 he persuaded the Muldoon government to present the major Colin McCahon painting Victory over Death to the newly opened National Gallery of Australia in Canberra. He was a member of the board that set up the Museum of New Zealand and a member of its interim board. He has sat on the board of the Auckland Art Gallery and has been consultant to a number of public and private art galleries.

He was part of a small group that persuaded Len Lye to donate his works to the Govett-Brewster Art Gallery in New Plymouth and was an original trustee of the Len Lye Foundation. He was the original negotiator for the Te Maori exhibition. In 1999 he convened the government review into New Zealand's cultural infrastructure Heart of the Nation. In 2006 Keith curated Towards Auckland: Colin McCahon, the gallery years at the Auckland Art Gallery.

== Political involvement ==
In 1969 he stood as a Labour candidate for the Parliamentary seat of Remuera. In 1990 he stood in a by-election unsuccessfully for Mayor of Auckland City as the Green Party candidate.

== Honours ==
Keith was appointed an Officer of the Order of the British Empire, for services to the arts, in the 1981 New Year Honours. In October 2009, the University of Waikato conferred an honorary doctorate on Keith. In the 2013 Queen's Birthday Honours, he was appointed a Companion of the New Zealand Order of Merit, for services to the arts.

== Publications ==
Keith has published a number of books on art, social history, self-help and cooking, including:

- Native Wit Random House 2008
- The Big Picture a history of New Zealand art since 1642 Random House 2007
- A Lovely Day Tomorrow: New Zealand in the 1940s. Auckland: Random House New Zealand. 1991. p. 80. ISBN 9781869411411.
- With Dr Gail Ratcliffe, Being Single and Happy. Australia: Simon & Schuster, 1991.
- A Plague of Professionals. Auckland: Auckland Museum and Institute, 1990.
- Salute to New Zealand. Auckland: Lansdowne Press, 1990.
- with Tony Papas, The Bayswater Brasserie Book of Food. Australia: Simon and Schuster, 1989.
- with Dinah Bradley, Becoming Single; a separated person’s resource book. Auckland & Australia: Century Hutchinson NZ / Simon & Schuster, 1988.
- with James Siers (1986). Above Auckland. Auckland: Millwood Press. ISBN 9780908582785.
- How to Discover New Zealand. Auckland: Braynart Publishing, 1986.
- New Zealand Yesterdays: a social history of New Zealand in the 20th century. Auckland: Reader's Digest Books, 1984.
- Images of Early New Zealand. Auckland: David Bateman, 1983.
- 'New Zealand', in The Visual Arts. Australia: Jacaranda Press, 1972.
- with Gordon H. Brown, New Zealand Painting 1827 – 1967: an introduction. Auckland: Collins, 1969.
- New Zealand Art 1827–1890. Wellington: AH & AW Reed, 1968.

He has also acted as a consultant on a number of publications and book series:

- Consultant Editor, The New Zealand Book of Events. Auckland: Reed Methuen, 1986.
- Editorial Advisory Board, New Zealand Encyclopaedia. Auckland: Bateman, 1983.
- Editorial Consultant, Wild New Zealand. Reader's Digest Books, 1979.
- General Editor, New Zealand Art Series, AH & AW Reed, 1976–79.
