= Pat Hanly =

New Zealand artist (1932–2004)

- Born: James Patrick Hanly; 2 August 1932; Palmerston North, New Zealand
- Died: 20 September 2004 (aged 72); Auckland, New Zealand
- Education: Canterbury College School of Art
- Known for: Painting
- Notable work: The seven ages of man, Torso

James Patrick Hanly (2 August 1932 – 20 September 2004), generally known as Pat Hanly, was a prolific New Zealand painter. One of his works is a large mural Rainbow Pieces (1971) at Christchurch Town Hall.

== Early life ==
Born in Palmerston North, Hanly was educated at Palmerston North Boys' High School. His parents organised a hairdressing apprenticeship for him and he left school during 1948 without completing his fourth-form year. During this time Hanly took night classes and then enrolled as a non-diploma student at the Canterbury College School of Art in Christchurch in 1952. After completing his studies there, Hanly travelled to Europe, and attended classes at the Chelsea School of Art.

== Career ==
Hanly returned to New Zealand in 1962, and accepted a part-time position teaching drawing at the University of Auckland School of Architecture. Hanly is one of New Zealand's most prolific artists. Hanly continued to paint until his retirement in 1994.

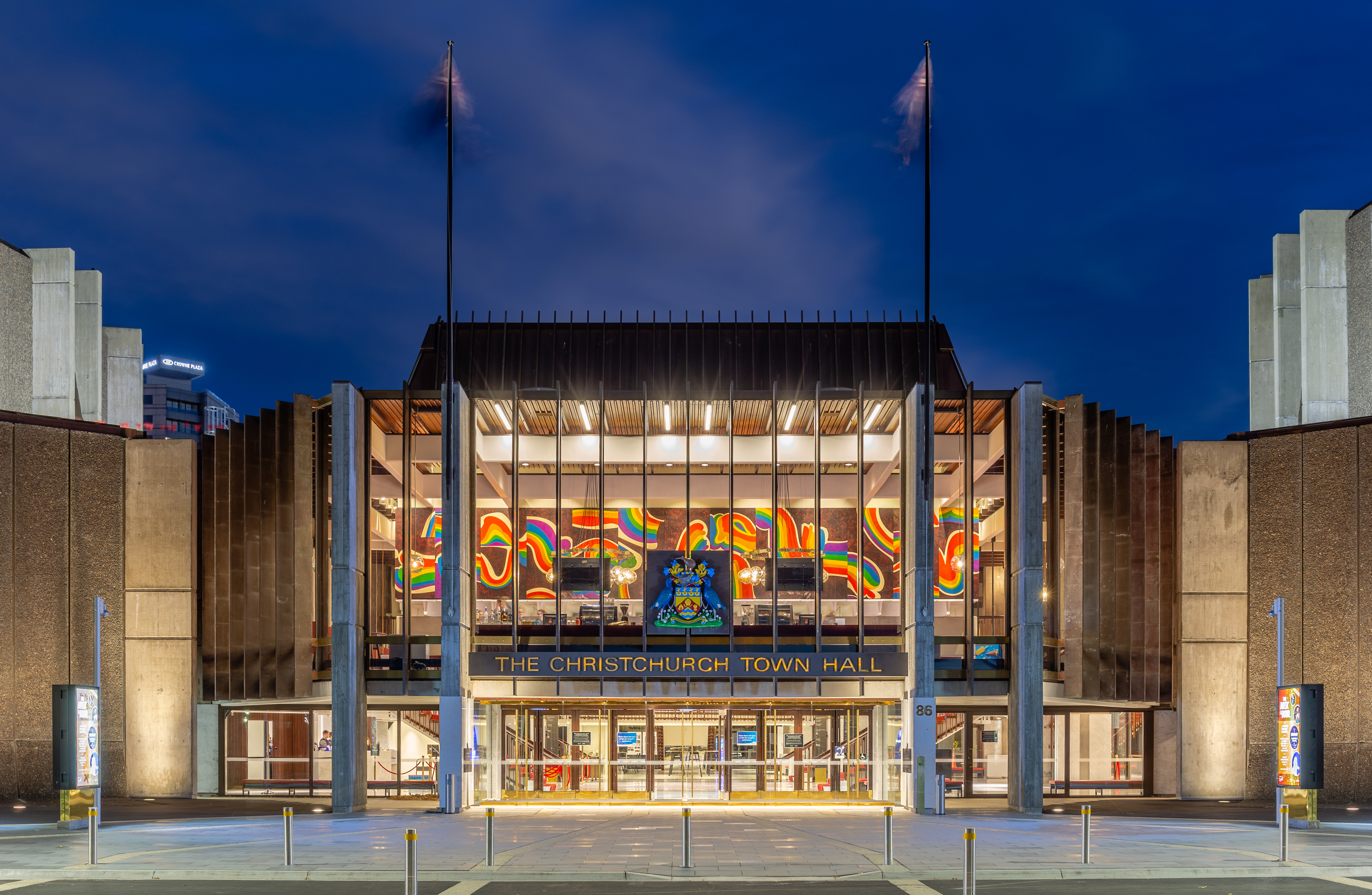
The restored mural Rainbow Pieces (1971) at Christchurch Town Hall, commissioned by Sir Miles Warren, photographed in 2019.

=== Major public commissions ===
Hanly completed a number of large public murals at Auckland Airport, the University of Auckland School of Architecture, and the Aotea Centre. Hanly was also responsible for the Peace Mural on the corner of Karangahape and Ponsonby Roads in Auckland. Hanly was also commissioned by Miles Warren to paint "Rainbow Pieces" for the Christchurch Town Hall in 1971. His murals the Seven Ages of Man are displayed in the University of Auckland Medical School building.

=== Critical recognition ===
During his time at the Canterbury College School of Art, Hanly received the Turner Prize for landscape, open to students, in 1953. He won the Manawatu Prize for Contemporary Art four times (1963, 1964, 1966, and 1967).

In 1971 Hanly was one of ten artists chosen for the Ten Big Paintings exhibition to celebrate the opening of a new wing for the Auckland Art Gallery Toi o Tāmaki.

His artwork is held in several New Zealand institutions including the collections of Te Papa, Auckland Art Gallery Toi o Tāmaki.i and Christchurch Art Gallery Te Puna o Waiwhetu.

=== Legacy ===
The Pat Hanly Creativity Awards are an annual award for senior secondary school artists established in 2002. In 2021 there were 67 students from 35 schools that took part.

Along with artists Tony Fomison and Philip Clairmont, Hanly mentored the artist Fatu Feu'u in the 1980s to explore his Samoan culture in his artwork.

In 1998 Hanly and his family were interviewed for a television documentary about his life as an activist and painter called Pacific Ikon.

A survey book about his art Pat Hanly was published in 2012 was published by Ron Sang Publications.

== Personal life ==
Hanly married Gillian (Gil) Taverner in 1958 and the couple had one son and one daughter. Hanly had another daughter in 1979, Amber, outside of his marriage. Gil took up photography in the late 1970s and became a photographer of note. Pat Hanly was an anti-nuclear activist who 'opposed French nuclear testing in the Pacific and visiting American warships' including painting anti-nuclear art. The New Zealand Who's Who listed his recreations as kite flying, sailing and Greenpeace.

Hanly died in Auckland on 20 September 2004, having suffered from Huntington's disease.
