= Christchurch Central Library =

Former library in Christchurch, New Zealand

Canterbury Public Library building
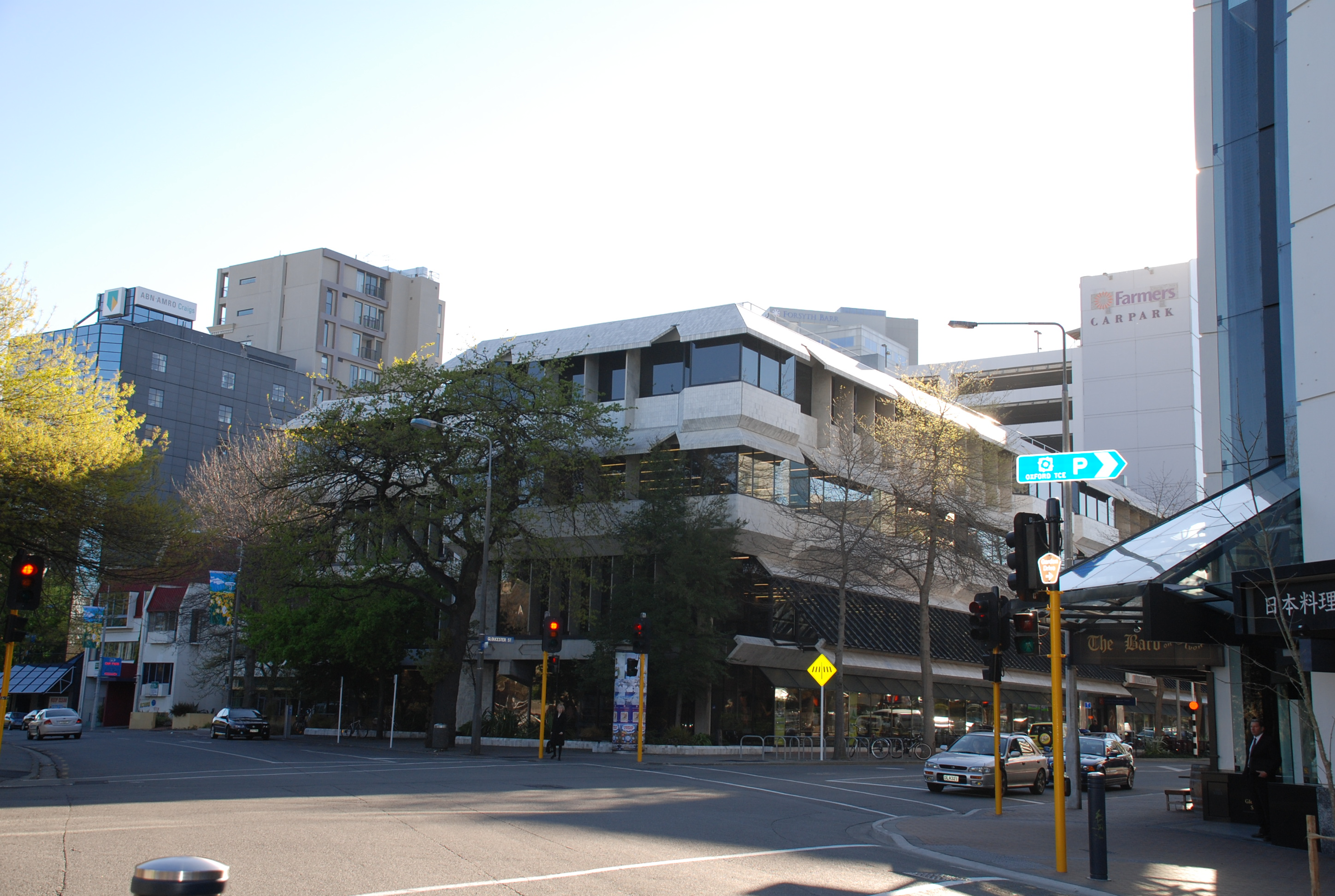
- Christchurch Central Library in 2007
- Interactive map of the Canterbury Public Library building area

General information
- Type: Library
- Location: Christchurch Central City, Gloucester Street, Christchurch, New Zealand
- Coordinates: 43°31′47″S 172°38′06″E
- Opened: 2 February 1982; 44 years ago
- Closed: 22 February 2011; 15 years ago
- Cost: NZ$5.8m
- Owner: Christchurch City Council

Technical details
- Floor count: Four storeys

Design and construction
- Architect: Warren and Mahoney
- Main contractor: Charles Luney

The Canterbury Public Library building, was a library in Central Christchurch and the main library of Christchurch City Libraries, New Zealand. It was the largest library in the South Island and the third-biggest in New Zealand. It was also known as the Central Library. It opened in 1982 on the corner of Oxford Terrace and Gloucester Street but was closed on the day of the 22 February 2011 Christchurch earthquake. After the earthquake temporary libraries to serve the Central City were set up at South City Mall, Tuam Street, Manchester Street and Peterborough Street. The building was demolished in 2014 to make way for the Convention Centre Precinct. Tūranga, the replacement library, and Civic Space was opened in 2018.

== History ==
The Canterbury Public Library dates back to 1859 and the original buildings were on the corner of Cambridge Terrace and Hereford Street. Eventually over 100 years old, a replacement was needed, and after years of searching for a suitable site, the property on the corner of Gloucester Street and Oxford Terrace was purchased in 1974. The new site was again facing the Avon River, was across the river from the historic Canterbury Provincial Council Buildings, and was only a short walk away from the town centre in Cathedral Square.

The architecture firm Warren and Mahoney was engaged to design the building, and Charles Luney was the principal contractor. The total price for the site and construction was NZ$5.8m. The building was opened by Sir David Beattie, the Governor-General, on 2 February 1982. Membership grew dramatically after the opening, and within three months, 10,000 new members were gained.

The library had four floors, with a total area of 6,000 square metres (65,000 sq ft). The ground floor and the first floor were linked by an escalator, with the second and third floor used for internal services. Another one and a half floors were added in 1997, and another escalator was added from the first to the second floor, expanding the area open to the public. Further changes were made to the building in 2001.

== Earthquakes ==
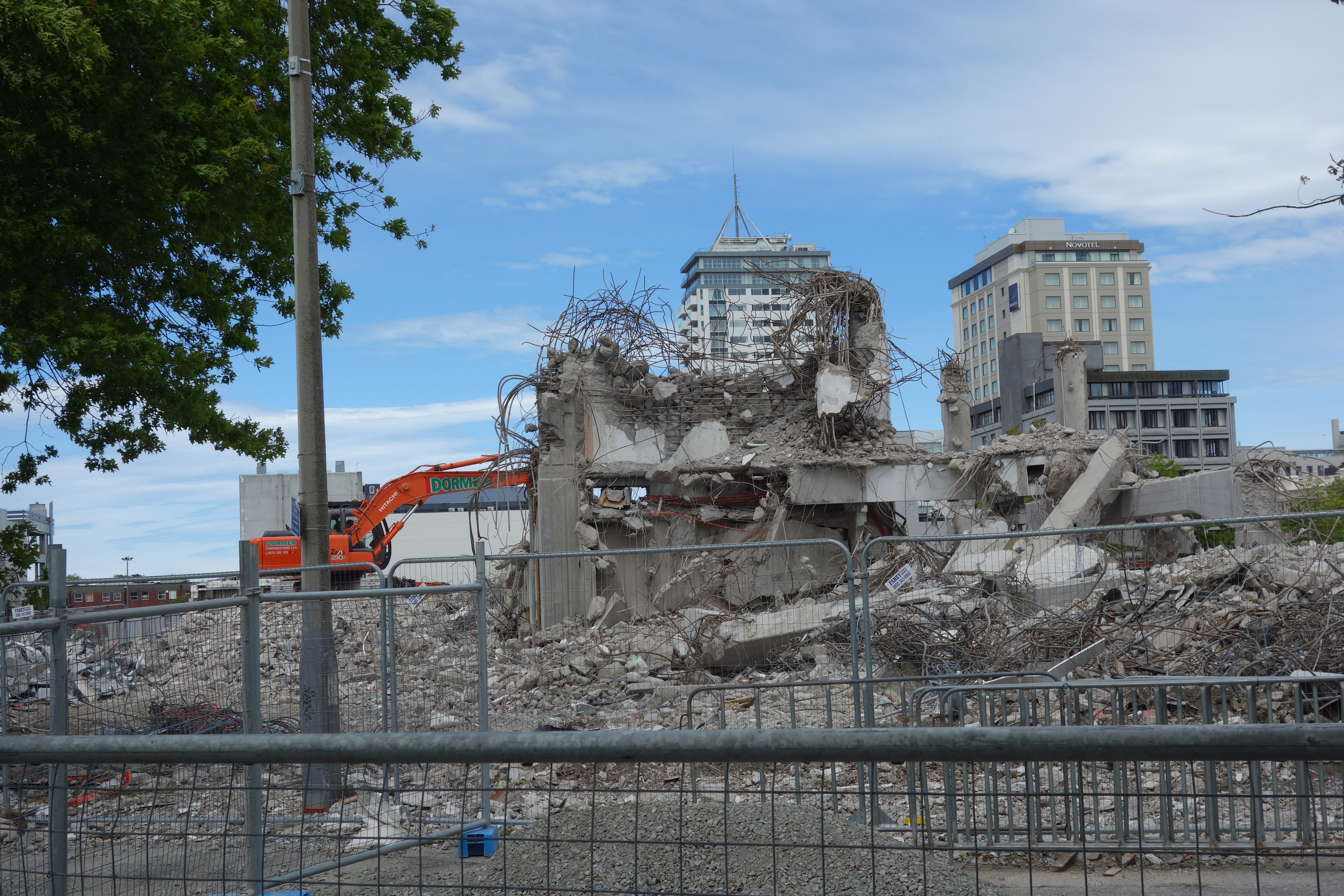
Christchurch Central Library during demolition

The library building suffered little structural damage in the 22 February 2011 Christchurch earthquake, the central city was declared a redzone and the city centre was not accessible to the public. With the red zone cordon shrinking over time, alternative central city library locations were established in South City Mall (8 July 2011 – 15 July 2012), Peterborough Street (19 December 2011 – present), Tuam Street (July 2012 – November 2013), and Manchester Street (20 January 2014 – present). The Tuam Street library was conveniently located adjacent to the temporary bus exchange and became necessary as more books were recovered from the central building in Gloucester Street, but it closed again as the land was designated for the Justice and Emergency Services Precinct.

The Central Library was located within the area that the Christchurch Central Recovery Plan designated for Te Pae and for that reason, the building was demolished during September and October 2014. Tūranga, the new Central library and Civic space opened in October 2018.
