= Christchurch City Libraries =

Library system for Christchurch, New Zealand

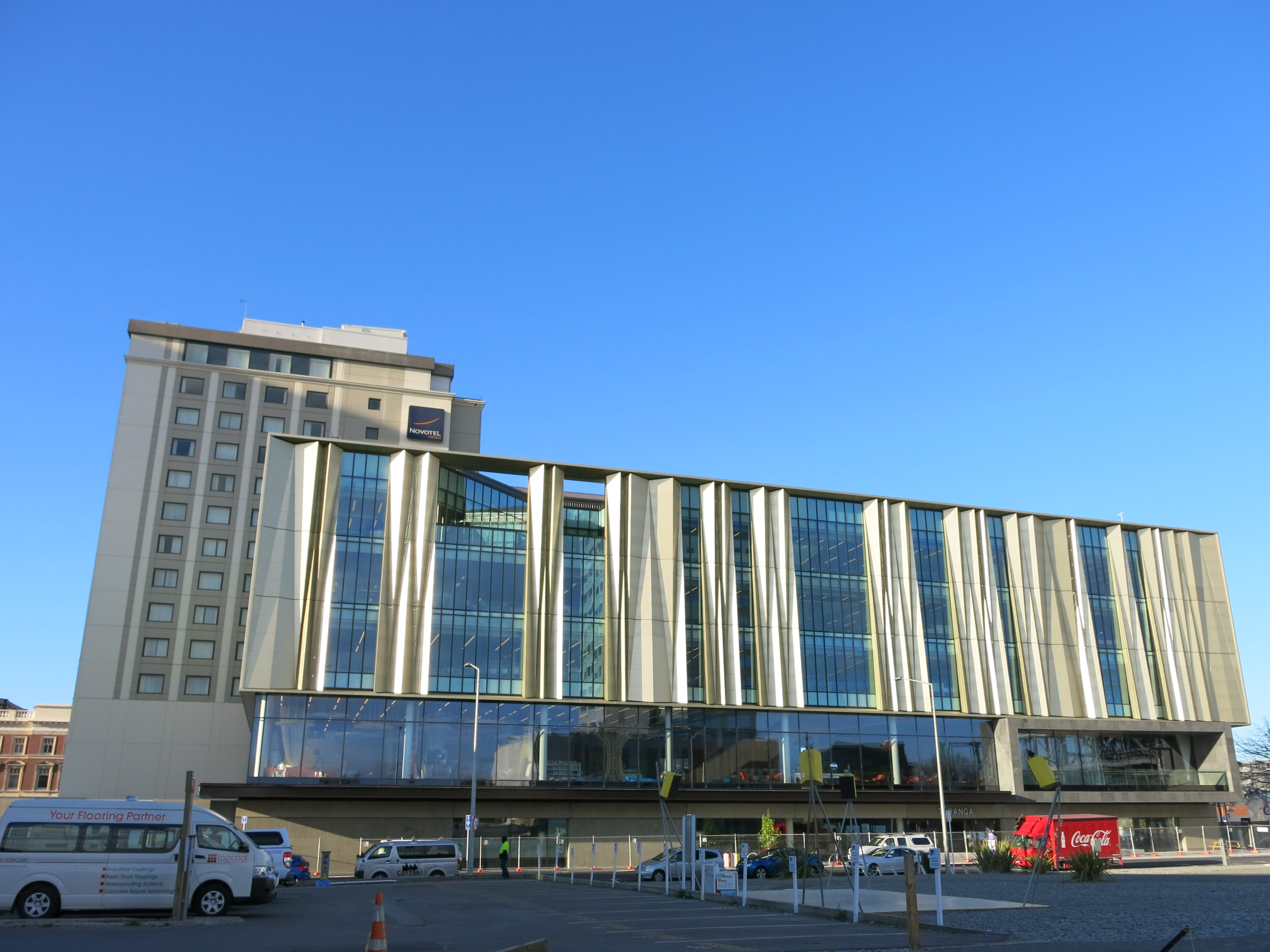
- Tūranga – the new post-earthquake central library in 2019
- 43.5300°S 172.6346°E
- Location: Christchurch, New Zealand
- Established: 1859
- Branches: 20

Collection
- Size: 1,089,818 (June 2008)

Access and use
- Circulation: 5,980,509 (July 2007 – June 2008)
- Population served: 369,006 (2018 census)

Other information
- Director: Carolyn Robertson (Libraries and Information Manager)
- Employees: 254
- Website: christchurchcitylibraries.com

Christchurch City Libraries is a network of 21 libraries and a mobile library, operated by the Christchurch City Council. Following the 2011 Christchurch earthquake the previous Christchurch Central Library building was demolished, and was replaced by a new central library building in Cathedral Square, Tūranga, which opened in 2018. A number of community libraries were also rebuilt post earthquake.

== Early history ==
The library began as the Mechanics' Institute in 1859, when 100 subscribers leased temporary premises in the then Town Hall. The collection consisted of a few hundred books.

By 1863, with the help of a grant from the Provincial Government, the Mechanics' Institute opened a building on a half-acre of freehold land on the corner of Cambridge Terrace and Hereford Street, purchased the year before at a cost of £262.10.0. This site was to remain the home of the library until 1982.

Debt, dwindling subscribers and other problems forced the institute to hand over the building to the Provincial Government in 1873. By this time the collection numbered some 5,000 volumes, and was placed by the Province under the control of the new Canterbury College (later University). With the abolition of the provinces in 1876, the library became the property of the college, ratified by an Act of Parliament in 1878.

== College years ==
Canterbury College controlled the library for over 70 years. Despite continual financial problems the bookstock and service continued to develop during most of the time.

=== Growth ===
Francis Stedman was the first official librarian (1876–1891), although he divided his time between the library and the college, where he was also registrar. By 1881 Stedman had increased the bookstock to 15,000 volumes. By 1898 when Alexander Cracroft Wilson (son of John Cracroft Wilson) was librarian (1891–1906) the stock had increased to nearly 30,000. Ten years later, under Howard Strong (1906–1913), the stock numbered over 40,000 volumes.

This dramatic growth was partly due to the gift of James Gammack, who donated the income and rents from some 1,600 acres (6.5 km^{2}) of land to the library in his will in 1896. This enabled the college to demolish the original wooden Mechanics' Institute building in 1901 and replace it with a permanent material structure.

Truly modern library service began under the librarianship of E. J. Bell (1913–1951). Bell classified the entire collection under the new Dewey Decimal system (still in use) by 1914, and opened a children's section that same year.

In 1918, with the support of the Canterbury Progress League, a Technical Library was opened. Two years later a travelling library service to country districts began, a service that continued until the establishment of the nationwide Country Library Service in 1938.

In 1924 a new wing of the library was opened including a separate children's room. A new heating unit was installed that same year.

The 1930s saw a decline in the service to the public due to the Great Depression, although in 1935 the Canterbury Public Library Journal was started. If in 1940 some 1,500 people a day were using the library, the book stock had scarcely increased since the 1920s.

Canterbury College was finding it increasingly difficult to maintain the library in any form. Ever since the 1880s it had held discussions with the Christchurch City Council with a view to handing over control of the library to the council, but it had proved impossible to reach final agreement.

In 1936 the council agreed in principle to take over the library, and made its first grant towards its upkeep. Control of the library was passed to the council by the Canterbury Public Library Act 1948, and ownership was formally transferred in late 1948.

== Council control ==
Under a new librarian, Ron O'Reilly, (1951–1968), the sheaf catalogue was transferred to a card system. The library became free in 1952, although a modest charge was retained for some popular books.

The book stock expanded rapidly, and new services became available for the first time. In 1953, the library began purchasing prints and original works of art for loan. This collection now includes original works by some of New Zealand's best known contemporary painters, including Colin McCahon, Toss Woollaston, Rita Angus and Doris Lusk.

In 1942, Dr. J.C. Bradshaw had bequeathed 600 volumes of music manuscripts to the library. Under O'Reilly this collection was expanded, and in 1955 the library began purchasing and lending recordings, a collection that is now an outstanding catalogue of serious music.

The dramatic expansion of services and stock required extensive alterations to the buildings. A floor was added to the old Reference Library and the New Zealand room was opened in 1956. A bindery was opened in 1952 to repair existing stock and stiffen new books and periodicals.

To supplement the collections of existing volunteer suburban libraries the Suburban Extension Division was started in 1958. The first branch library, at Spreydon, was opened in 1971, and has since been followed by branches at New Brighton, Papanui, Shirley and a mobile library. A further branch was planned for Linwood to complete the suburban network.

Following O'Reilly's departure in 1968 services continued to expand under his successor John Stringleman. The stock has grown to nearly 400,000 books, used by over 90,000 registered borrowers. Subject areas include Children's, Social Sciences and Humanities, Commerce, Science and Technology, and a fine New Zealand collection.

New services continued into the 1970s. Paperbacks were introduced in 1973, along with a housebound readers' service (Storyline) and a collection of books for adult new readers. SATIS, a technical information service for business firms, was begun in 1977 as a cooperative venture between Government and city.

== Technology ==
The library was the first public library in New Zealand to use a computerised lending system (1975). In 1995, the library was the first library in New Zealand to give internet access to its catalogue.

== Late 2000s ==
By the late 1960s it was obvious that site on the corner of Cambridge Terrace and Hereford Street could not cope with the library's growth, although some temporary accommodation was achieved with the addition of a mezzanine floor in 1970 and a prefabricated annex in 1975. In 1974 a new site was chosen on the corner of Gloucester Street and Oxford Terrace, and Warren and Mahoney chosen as architects. The next seven years saw the planning and development of this new home, with Charles Luney as the builder. Christchurch Central Library was opened to the public on 12 January 1982.

By the 1960s the adjoining local bodies of Waimairi District Council and Paparua County Council had also established professional library services, and these, with the central and community libraries, formed the new Canterbury Public Library network following local government reorganisation in 1989.

Canterbury Public Library celebrated 50 years of unity with the Christchurch City Council in October 1998. To mark the occasion, the library held a number of events, including a parade for information literacy in which over 700 people from various organisations, schools and community groups participated.

In July 2000 Canterbury Public Library adopted a new name, Christchurch City Libraries. A new brand and logo were also launched to reflect the new name and the increasing range of services offered.

In March 2006 Christchurch City amalgamated with the Banks Peninsula District and the four Banks Peninsula libraries (Akaroa, Diamond Harbour, Little River and Lyttelton) became part of Christchurch City Libraries.

== Since the 2011 earthquake ==
The Gloucester Street central library building was extensively damaged during the 2011 Christchurch earthquake, and was demolished to make way for a new convention centre.

In its place, a new Central Library design was approved. While it was being built, two temporary central libraries operated in 87–91 Peterborough Street. and 36 Manchester Street.

The new central library is on the corner of Cathedral Square. Named "Tūranga", this new building was opened on 12 October 2018 at a completed cost of NZ$92 million.

== Gallery ==
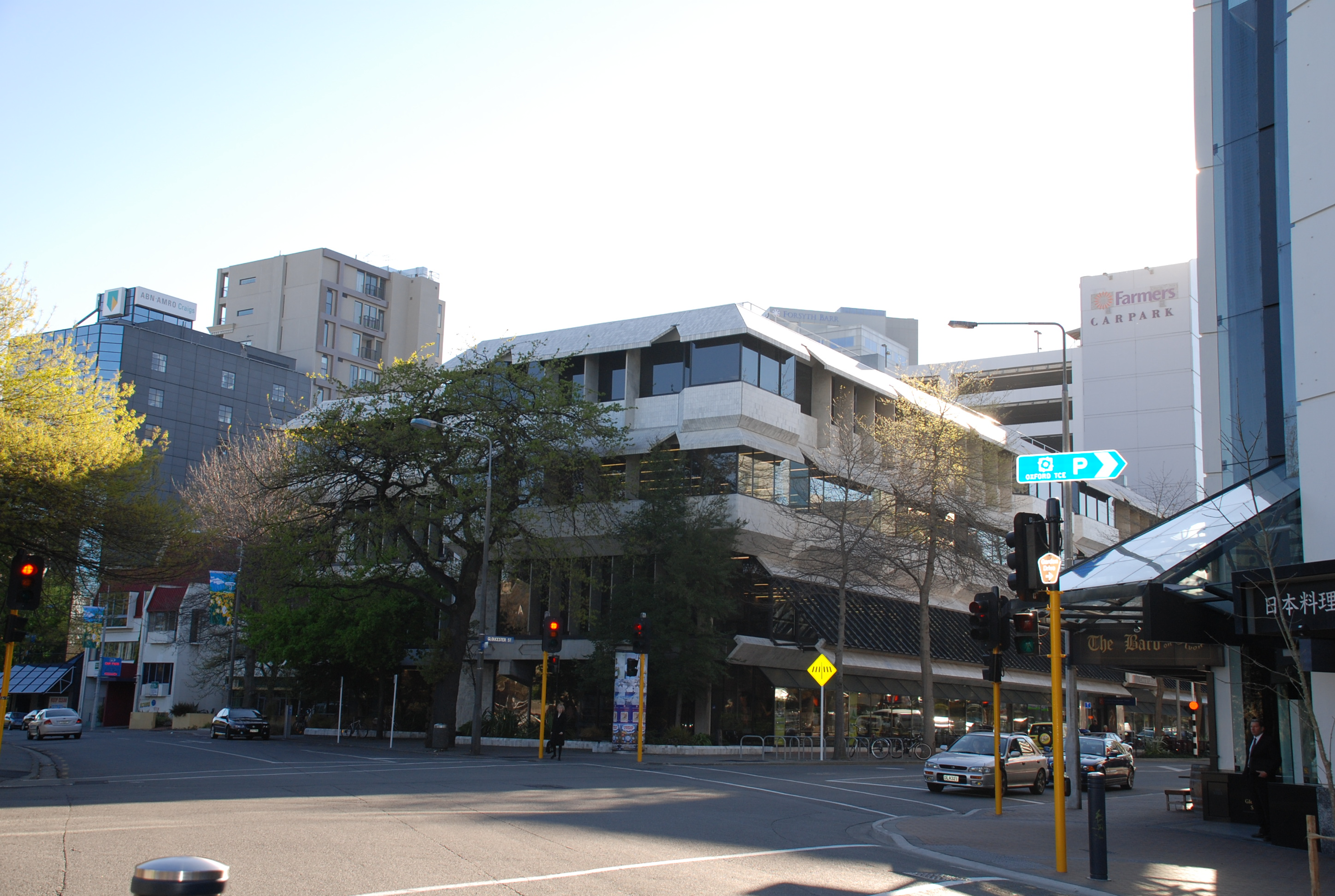
The Central Library in 2007

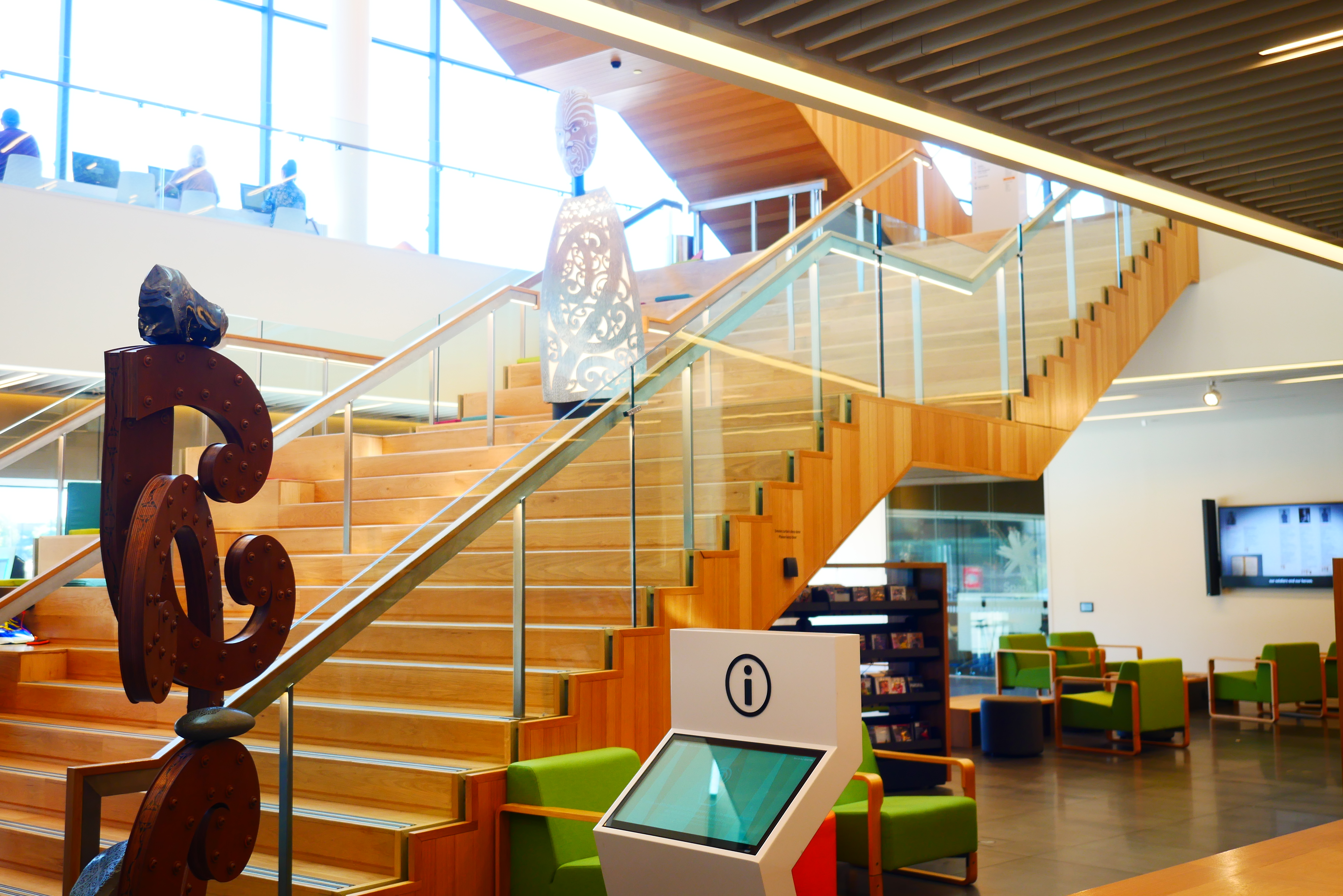
Tūranga interior

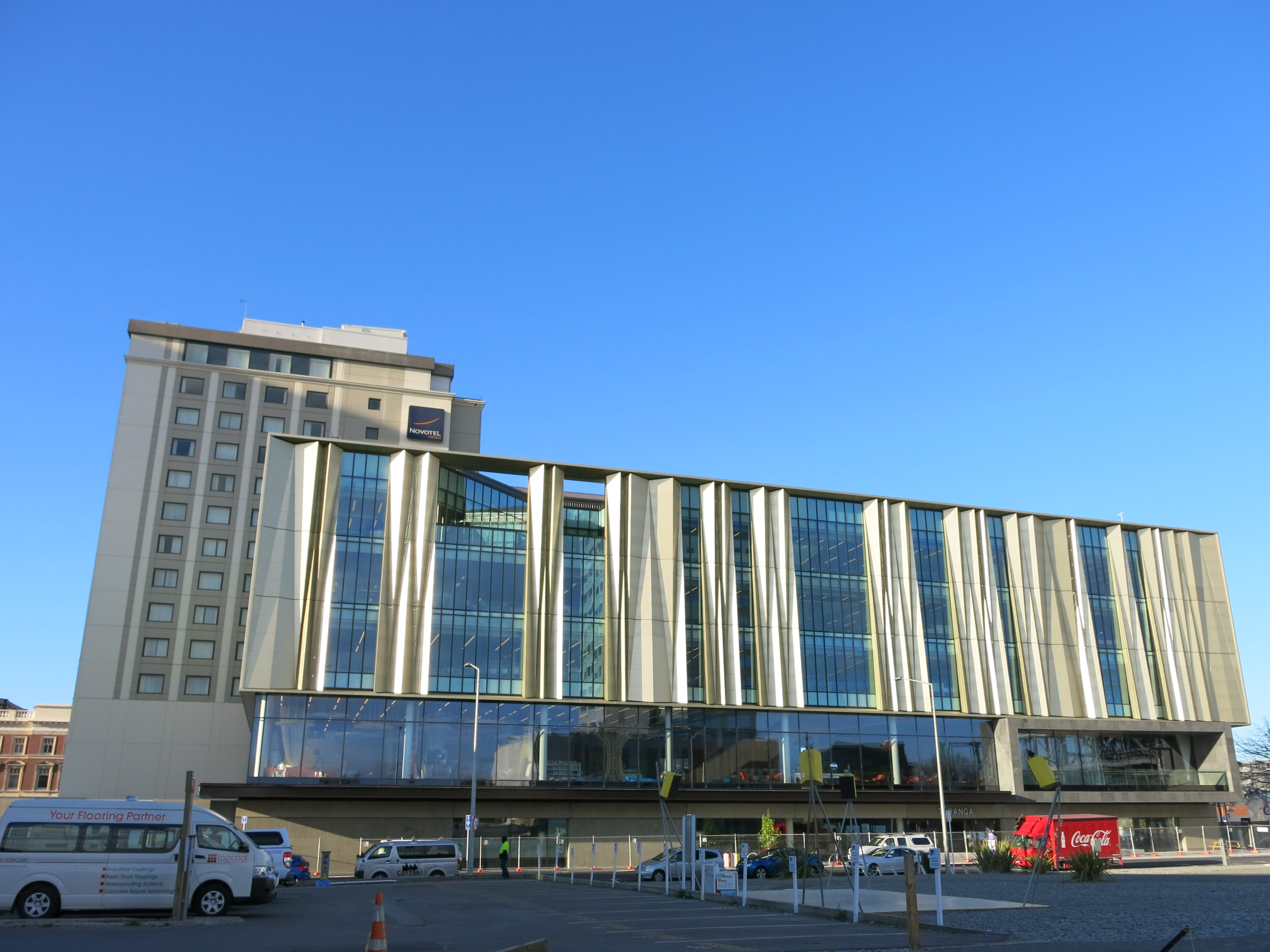
Tūranga, the post-2011-earthquake library in 2019
