= Ron O'Reilly =

New Zealand librarian (1914–1982)

Christchurch city librarian
- In office 1951–1968

Director of the Govett-Brewster Art Gallery
- In office 1975–1979

Personal details
- Born: Ronald Norris O'Reilly; 9 September 1914 Wellington, New Zealand
- Died: 10 July 1982 (aged 67) Wellington, New Zealand
- Children: 2
- Education: University of Otago
- Occupation: Librarian; gallery director

Ronald Norris O'Reilly (9 September 1914 – 10 July 1982) was a librarian who promoted and exhibited contemporary New Zealand art. He served as Christchurch city librarian from 1951 to 1968, and director of the Govett-Brewster Art Gallery from 1975 to 1979.

== Early life and family ==
Born in Wellington on 9 September 1914, O'Reilly was the son of James Matthew O'Reilly, a customs official, and Nellie Blanche May O'Reilly. After completing his secondary education at New Plymouth Boys' High School, he worked for the Customs Department from 1933 to 1946. In 1941, he graduated with a Master of Arts degree in philosophy from the University of Otago, and then taught there part-time for four years before completing the New Zealand Library Diploma at the Library School in Wellington.

In 1940, O'Reilly married Elizabeth Whittleston, and the couple had two children before divorcing in 1956. O'Reilly married Daphne Carruthers in 1956, but they later divorced.

== Library career ==
=== Early career (1947–1951) ===
From 1947 to 1951, O'Reilly organised the Country Library Service and worked on the provision of libraries in prisons and the library of the Health Department.

=== Christchurch city librarian (1951–1968) ===
In 1951, O'Reilly was appointed Christchurch city librarian and lived in that city for the next 17 years.

A progressive member of the profession, O'Reilly removed charges on borrowing, which raised lending rates by 300 percent. He also established an art lending library. At first this was a library of art prints, but in 1955 the city council agreed to include original works by artists. O'Reilly also organised an exhibition space upstairs in the library building called the Garrick Room where he showed exhibitions like Rouaut's Miserere and the 16 panels of McCahon's painting The Wake. By the time O'Reilly left the library in 1968, the loan collection consisted of 125 artworks and when the library stopped collecting in 1981, it had grown to 297 works. This collection is now held in the Christchurch Art Gallery Te Puna o Waiwhetū.

During his time as Christchurch city librarian, O'Reilly took two years leave of absence and served as a visiting professor at the Institute of Librarianship at the University of Ibadan in Nigeria. The visit sparked an enthusiasm for Nigerian sculpture and the beginnings of his collection of this work.

=== New Zealand Library School (1968–1974) ===
In 1968, O'Reilly left Christchurch to become director and lecturer at the New Zealand Library School, Wellington, where he worked until his official retirement in 1974.

== Friendship with Colin McCahon ==
From his student days at Otago, O'Reilly was a close friend of the artist Colin McCahon. The first ‘modern painting’ O'Reilly remembered seeing was in 1939 when he had a part in Fredrich Wolf's play Professor Mamlock. McCahon designed the set, which included one of his paintings. O'Reilly became a passionate collector, supporter and advisor to McCahon and, while on a short secondment to the Lower Hutt Municipal Library, helped organise McCahon's first survey exhibition of 44 works in the Wellington Public Library in 1947. A selection from this exhibition was also shown at the library in Lower Hutt. The following year, O'Reilly helped McCahon secure an exhibition at Helen Hitchings' newly opened dealer gallery in Wellington. The friendship of the two men was largely held together by letters, as they mostly lived in different cities. An exception was a brief period when O'Reilly moved to Christchurch in 1951 when he showed McCahon's On Building Bridges in the library. A transformative effect of the exhibition came out of a visit to the library by Eric Westbrook, recently appointed director of Auckland City Art Gallery. On seeing On building bridges, he offered McCahon a life-changing job at the gallery in Auckland.

Throughout their long friendship, O'Reilly often accompanied McCahon on his walking field trips taking photographs, looking for subjects, and discussing features of the landscape with the artist. The art dealer Peter McLeavey recalled of O'Reilly, "He was always taking photographs: he had a sense of history, and the importance of recording the present". In recognition of their association, in 1972 McCahon asked O'Reilly to write the introduction to his major survey exhibition Colin McCahon: A Survey Exhibition.

O'Reilly was also a long-term collector of McCahon's work, making purchases from the mid 1940s to the end of the 1970s. In 1969, seventeen works from his collection were shown at Peter McLeavey Gallery. The Dominion commented, "It is ironic that one of the best collections of the best artist in New Zealand has been bought by a private citizen ... while one assumes the National Art Gallery apparently ignored the artist". Over the years, McCahon also gifted O'Reilly a number of works including the paintings Crucifixion according to Saint Mark, King of the Jews, and Singing Woman.

== Govett-Brewster Art Gallery ==
O'Reilly was appointed director of New Plymouth's contemporary art gallery, the Govett-Brewster Art Gallery, in 1975. He was 61 with no experience in the profession. Art writer Wystan Curnow described the appointment as "bold" with its reliance on O'Reilly's administrative experience and the connections he had made as a collector and supporter of contemporary New Zealand art.

O'Reilly's arrival at the gallery coincided with the installation of three large Len Lye kinetic sculptures, including Trilogy. Unfortunately, the gyrations created by Trilogy cracked the main beam of the new gallery. Unfazed, O'Reilly gave the go-ahead for the beam to be braced and the installation completed. This was the beginning of the gallery's unique relationship with Len Lye. O'Reilly went on to become a key figure in an expanding partnership with the artist that eventually changed the gallery dramatically when it became the Govett Art Gallery/Len Lye Centre in 2015.

One of the first exhibitions that O'Reilly curated at the Govett-Brewster was McCahon's Necessary Protection. As Wystan Curnow points out, apart from Colin McCahon a Survey, for which O'Reilly wrote the catalogue introduction, it was, "the only solo public gallery exhibition offered to McCahon in his lifetime".

Other exhibitions curated or organised by O'Reilly during his directorship include:

- Billy Apple, Neon Accumulation (1975)
- Colin McCahon, Necessary Protection (1977)
- Woollaston: A Taranaki Excursion (1977)
- Len Lye Kinetic Works (1977)
- The Govett-Brewster's Great Show of Purchases over Ten Turbulent Years (1978–1979)
- Don Driver 1965–1978 (1979)

O'Reilly left the Govett-Brewster in 1979.

=== Controversies ===
During his four years as director of the Govett-Brewster Art Gallery, O'Reilly encountered a number of challenges as he attempted to continue the gallery's mandate to purchase works representative of current ideas even if they were seen as difficult. The first confrontation came the year he arrived when the local fire brigade ordered the removal of Billy Apple's Neon Accumulation on the gallery's back stairs as a hazard. There were further complaints when O'Reilly accepted the work as a gift from the artist to the gallery. The following year, attempts to purchase Christine Hellyar's sculpture Country clothesline were equally contentious with a public outcry over its cost and content. One city councillor described the work as, "the most appalling misappropriation of public money I have ever seen". O'Reilly, who had already been involved in a similar refusal by the city council to purchase Colin McCahon's I am Scared, held firm and both items eventually entered the collection.

== Later life and death ==
From 1980, O'Reilly was a consultant on the administration of libraries and art galleries. He died in Wellington on 10 July 1982, at the age of 68, and his ashes were buried at Te Henui Cemetery in New Plymouth.
