= Templeton Hospital =

Mental hospital for children in New Zealand

Templeton Hospital was the site of the first 'psychoapaedic' or psychiatric institution for children established in New Zealand, which opened outside the Canterbury township of Templeton in 1929 and closed in 2000.

== History ==
Templeton Hospital was an administrative offshoot of Sunnyside Mental Hospital which was the first hospital for the mentally ill in Ōtautahi Christchurch, New Zealand, and ran from 1863 to 2001. Sunnnyside was separated administratively from Templeton Hospital in 1960.

In 1917, 338 acres of land was purchased on Kirk's Road in Templeton by the Government for 'mental hospital purposes'. 'Templeton Hospital Farm' was built by 1919, when it was inspected by Dr. Hay, the 'Inspector-General of Mental Hospitals'.

On this site in 1929, New Zealand's first psychopaedic institution, known as Templeton Farm Mental Deficiency Colony was established. Its ethos was informed by the eugenics movement of the period, as reflected in the 1928 Mental Defectives Amendment Act which arose from the earlier 1911 Mental Defectives Act. The institution was set up under the authority of Scottish eugenicist Dr Theodore Gray who was then the Director-General of the Mental Hospitals Department. 'To protect white racial fitness [Grey] wanted segregated farm colonies for those with intellectual disability or mental illness, registration, screening and sterilisation. The first residents were boys but soon girls were sent there too, although sexes were segregated inside the institution. Dr. Gray personally signed some of the admission forms.' Templeton Hospital became a specialised state institution, for the [long term] care, control and vocational training of children with intellectual disabilities, who has previously been cared for in psychiatric hospitals.

These children were also known by the official terms ‘feebleminded’ 'idiot' and 'imbecile. 'This category generally included children with intellectual disabilities, neurodiversity, and conditions like epilepsy. It also often included children who were simply from poor families and were having trouble at school.' Parents were told that their intellectually disabled children would be 'happier with their own kind', but in line with eugenic theory, segregation from society to prevent their reproduction was the primary motivation. This meant that infants and children were committed to Templeton Hospital as permanent residents, many living there for their entire lives. Disability researcher Hilary Stace 'estimates that by the 1970s, two percent of New Zealand's population was institutionalised.' “Templeton at its height had hundreds of young people, and then of course they never left...that pattern was repeated around the country". From eight initial admissions, the number of residents peaked at 654 in 1974, and fell to 480 by 1994.

The concept of a 'farm colony' arose from the Victorian notion that hard outdoor work could both restore mental health and subsidise the costs of state institutional care through agricultural production. 'The Templeton Farm comprised nine hundred and eighty acres, of which seven hundred acres was used for livestock (cows, pigs and sheep) and mixed cropping activities': produce was supplied to Templeton Hospital as well as other institutions. In 1935 the farm component of the institution was known as Jenkins Farm, which adjoined the hospital: both were run together. Once they reached adolescence, able male residents worked on the farm and/or in the large garden area, cutting lawns and hedges, grubbing gorse and weeds, growing and digging potatoes as well as cleaning water races. Able female residents worked in the laundry, kitchens and in other domestic roles.

'[I]n 1967, the Templeton Farm Colony was dis-established with the transfer of eight hundred acres to the Agriculture Department, to be used as a crown agriculture research station. The Templeton Farm Colony's loss of the farm acreage and its related farming activities, (which left the hospital and school as its major assets) meant that it increasingly became referred to as the Templeton Hospital and Training School.'

== Buildings and amenities ==
The first villa at Templeton Hospital was commissioned in 1927, and the second in 1929. Two additional villas were completed before the two built in 1935 by Christchurch contractor Charles Luney, one for adult males and one for 'juveniles.' These were constructed from timber, and each accommodated four dormitories, each for twelve residents, in addition to a day room, a dining room, a kitchen block and staff quarters. The villas multiplied over time and were known by names of trees: Maple, Briar, Kauri, Hinau, Rimu, Totara, Manuka, Cedar, Kowhai, Pine, Tawa, Puriri, Poplar, Nikau, Miro, Rata and Beech. The site was closed in 2000, and the villas bulldozed down shortly afterward.

In 1935, a staff tennis court was constructed as well as a new water tower and workshops for the residents, to be taught 'congenial trades'. These included 'the production and/or repair of furniture, venetian blinds, livestock covers, wooden toys, foot-wear and leather-craft accessories.'

In 1966, a chapel was built on the site, designed by architect George Lucking and constructed in the modernist style of exposed concrete block and rough-sawn timber. It is known as the Templeton Chapel of the Holy Family. A large wooden board along the right side of the chapel contains lists of hundreds of former residents of Templeton Hospital who died there, dating from 1930 to 2020, printed in gold lettering. The chapel was donated by the Crown to the Holy Family Community Trust in September 2001. On 24 May 2017 the chapel's architect posthumously received the 2017 Enduring Architecture Award from the Canterbury Branch of the New Zealand Institute of Architects.

The Templeton Hospital site is now known as 'Innovation Park', containing several agriculturally-related businesses in both new and re-purposed Templeton Hospital buildings. As of January 2025, along with the Chapel of the Holy Family, the original water tower and the staff tennis court also remain.

== Experiences of residents ==
A 2004 documentary film, called Out of Sight, Out of Mind and made by Christchurch film-maker Gerald Smyth told the story of Norman Madden who was sent to Templeton Hospital in 1940, aged six, 'for the 'crime' of being naughty and illiterate'. His admission papers were signed by Dr. Theodore Gray in 1934. At Templeton, Madden suffered physical and sexual abuse, was forced into work and denied his promised education. Smyth also followed Madden's campaign to receive a Government apology 'for the inhumane treatment he endured through his youth'. Smyth also interviewed several other former Templeton residents, after the home closed in 1996, some of whom had lived there for decades and had been sent there for equally spurious reasons, such as George Smith (1926–2003) who was admitted for stealing two pies from a Riverton shop. George lived at Templeton Hospital for 60 years. Other Templeton survivors interviewed in the film who describe their inhumane treatment there include Maria Stewart, Rex Loveridge, Lilian Loveridge, Stella Dockery and Graham Cuszack.

A Templeton Hospital resident, Jabert, lived there for most of his life, and described it in the publication 'Tell Me About You: A life story approach to understanding disabled people's experiences in care (1950 - 1999)'. Here David P. also told his story about life at Templeton Hospital, where he had his 21st. He called it 'The Dump' and was once put in a laundry bag by a staff member. Also in this publication is the account of 'Sarah', who had two brothers in state care, 'Paul' (placed in Templeton) and 'Ricky' (placed in the Nelson institution, Braemar). She tells her story of reconnecting with them and understanding their care through their records.

Timaru-born Tony Ryder was a resident of Templeton Hospital from the age of 15 to 30 (1978–1993). He provided evidence of physical and sexual abuse at the Royal Commission of Inquiry into Abuse in Care in 2022. At Templeton Hospital villas Rowan and Rimu he suffered physical, sexual, and medical abuse as well as seclusion and neglect. He was molested by staff member John van der Pol at the Training Centre and at van der Pol's home. He reported that there was staff violence against the residents in Pine, Rata, Rowan, and Rimu villas. Tony spoke about how much his life improved when he was able to leave Templeton Hospital.

== Staff ==
The first matron at the Templeton Hospital was experienced psychiatric nurse Miss Isabella Duncan Brand, who came from Carrington Hospital in Auckland to take up the role. However, in June 1930 she lost her life on the nearby Sockburn railway crossing, after a collision between a car and a train, along with three other Templeton nurses, a hospital driver and the train driver.

In 1935, the matron of Templeton Hospital and the adjoining Jenkins Farm was Miss Findlay.

== Allegations of abuse ==
In May 1961, a nurse at Templeton Hospital, Ivy Johan McIlwrick, aged 21, was charged with assaulting a 19-year-old female patient, who was left with extensive bruising.

In March 1976, a 21-year-old male nurse at Templeton, Dean Andrew Francis Hamilton, was charged with whipping a 14-year-old girl with a key chain before locking her in the women's toilets, leaving welts on her buttocks. He was later found guilty of the charge.

In November 1976, Hamilton was charged with kicking an 18-year-old boy named Johnny White, who had a mental age of two, in the Manuka Villa at Templeton Hospital. He was later found guilty of this charge, in addition to one of theft.

== The Royal Commission of Inquiry into Abuse in Care ==
As part of testimony provided to the Royal Commission of Inquiry into Abuse in Care, Ms KH, a former staff member at the Templeton Centre, 'believes some staff members did not see the residents as people. She said that residents at Templeton were rarely called by their given name'. Dr. Olive Webb noted that 'when she visited the wards at the Templeton Centre... many of the residents were naked. When people shared the toilet pans, they were all in one room. The staff who worked in that ward called it the “milking session”.' The commission was also informed that, in September 1986, 'two nursing tutors formally documented their concerns about the treatment of residents by staff at Templeton and filed their report with the Canterbury Hospital Board. Among the concerns raised was that “many staff demonstrate lack of respect for the dignity of the people who are placed in their care by trusting relatives".' In addition, 'survivors [at Templeton] experienced serious educational neglect in the form of limited, or no access to education, and / or poor quality of education. This educational neglect contributed to an ongoing social and economic disadvantage for disabled people in these institutions'.
