= Justice and Emergency Services Precinct =

Precinct for justice and emergency services in Christchurch, New Zealand

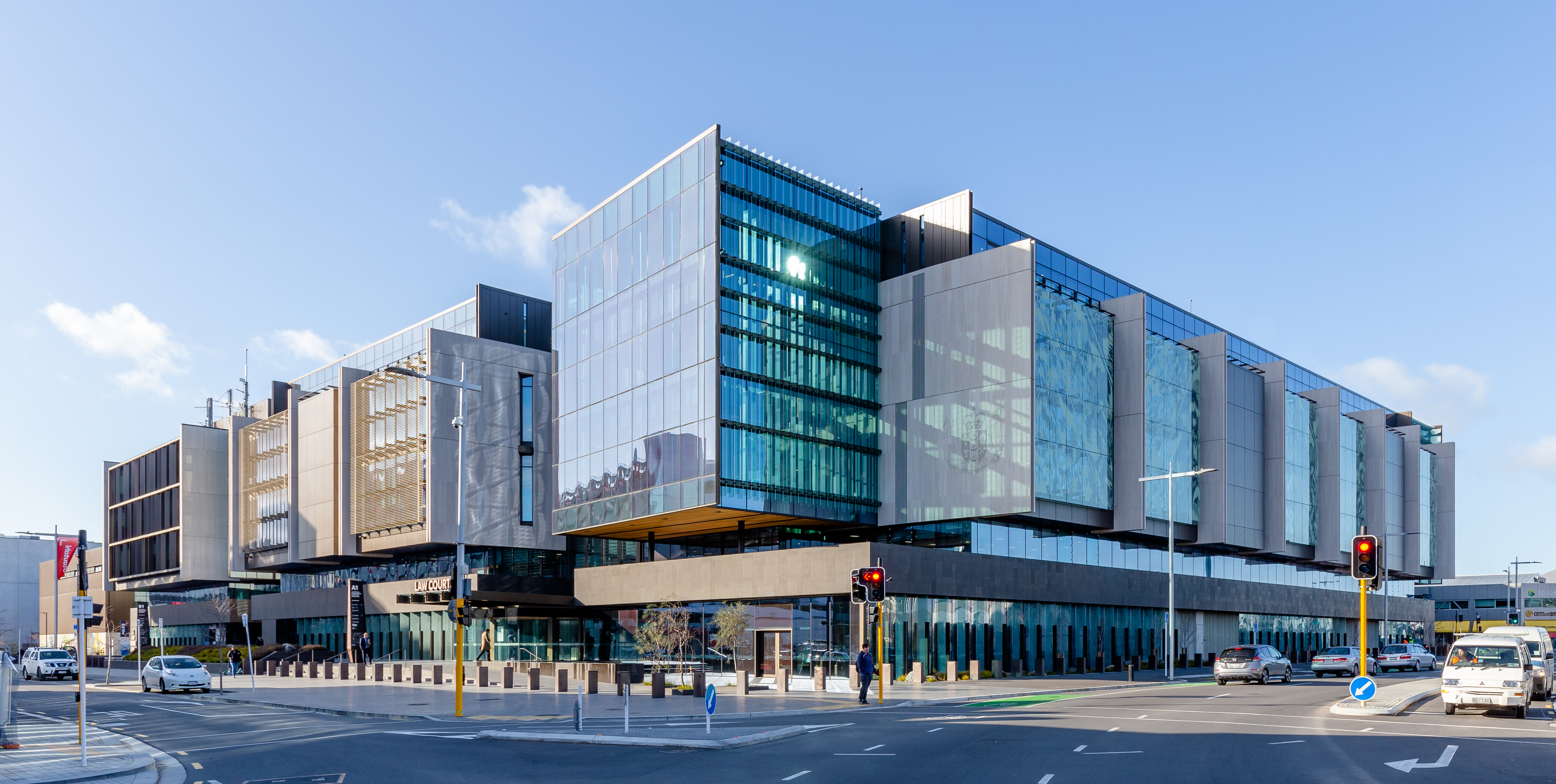
- The Precinct in 2019
- Interactive map of the Justice and Emergency Services Precinct area

General information
- Type: Government
- Architectural style: Contemporary
- Location: 20 Lichfield Street, Christchurch Central City, New Zealand
- Coordinates: 43°32′05″S 172°38′04″E
- Current tenants: Christchurch District Court; New Zealand Police; Department of Corrections; Fire and Emergency New Zealand; St John New Zealand; National Emergency Management Agency
- Year built: 2014–2017
- Groundbreaking: 22 January 2014
- Completed: September 2017
- Opened: 12 September 2017
- Cost: NZ$300 million

Technical details
- Floor count: 5
- Floor area: 42,000m^{2}

Design and construction
- Architecture firm: Warren & Mahoney; Cox Architecture; WSP Opus
- Structural engineer: Holmes Consulting Group
- Services engineer: WSP Opus
- Civil engineer: Holmes Consulting Group
- Main contractor: Fletcher Construction

The Justice and Emergency Services Precinct is a building complex in central Christchurch, New Zealand. It comprises three buildings: the Justice Building, the Emergency Services Building, and a car park for operational vehicles. It was constructed in the mid-2010s to house New Zealand Police and the Department of Corrections, law courts including the Christchurch District Court, as well as Fire and Emergency New Zealand, St John New Zealand, and the local and government Civil Defence agencies. The combined floor size of the Precinct is 42,000m^{2} and is the largest multi-agency co-location project by the government in the history of New Zealand to date.

The Precinct was developed as a key anchor project in the rebuild of Christchurch following the 2011 Christchurch earthquake. It was the first significant public building constructed and opened by the government following the earthquakes. The building was opened by Prime Minister Bill English in a ceremony on 12 September 2017.

In December 2019, two years after opening, the Precinct had undergone 1800 unplanned repairs at a cost of NZ$5.5 million, including replacing unsafe glass, fixing multiple leaks, and roughly 500 call-outs to repair the air conditioning system. The Public Service Association subsequently criticised the issues in a public statement.

== Background ==
Following the 2011 Christchurch earthquake, the Christchurch central business district underwent a substantial redesign as part of the Canterbury Earthquake Recovery project. The Justice and Emergency Services Precinct was first announced in July 2012 by Prime Minister John Key, as a major anchor project to be led by the Ministry of Justice. The 2012 plan defined four precincts for the central business district: health, arts and entertainment, retail, and justice and emergency. The Precinct would provide a new home for emergency services in Christchurch, with many key buildings having been damaged or lost in the quake, including the Christchurch Central Police Station.

In September 2013, Justice Minister Judith Collins released new details of the project, describing it as "one of the largest multi-agency government co-location projects in New Zealand history", and estimating that around 2000 people would visit the building on a daily basis, including 1200 people working in the complex. A substantial inner-city land parcel was required for the project; in October 2013, Canterbury Earthquake Recovery Minister Gerry Brownlee announced that most of the land had been secured in agreements between landowners and the CCDU.

== Design ==
The Precinct was architecturally designed by a consortium of Warren & Mahoney, Cox Architecture, and Opus Architecture. It was the largest multi-agency government project in New Zealand's history. The structural, civil and geotechnical engineering was undertaken by Holmes Consulting; the seismic design of the building uses base isolation and is built to an 'Importance level 4' standard. The property has three buildings: the Justice Building, the Emergency Services Building, and a car park for operational vehicles. It has five floors with a total floor area of 42,000m^{2}. The building also uses aquifer thermal energy storage for heating and cooling.

The site has an inner-courtyard which can be seen through a full-height, glazed public atrium. The architects rejected traditional design of the court buildings, which they described as "intimidating" spaces, and opted for a layout which felt more open and light. The design emphasises natural light, views out into the courtyard and city, and easy access and flow into the building, with a design language intended to decrease the sense of stress associated with justice and emergency buildings.

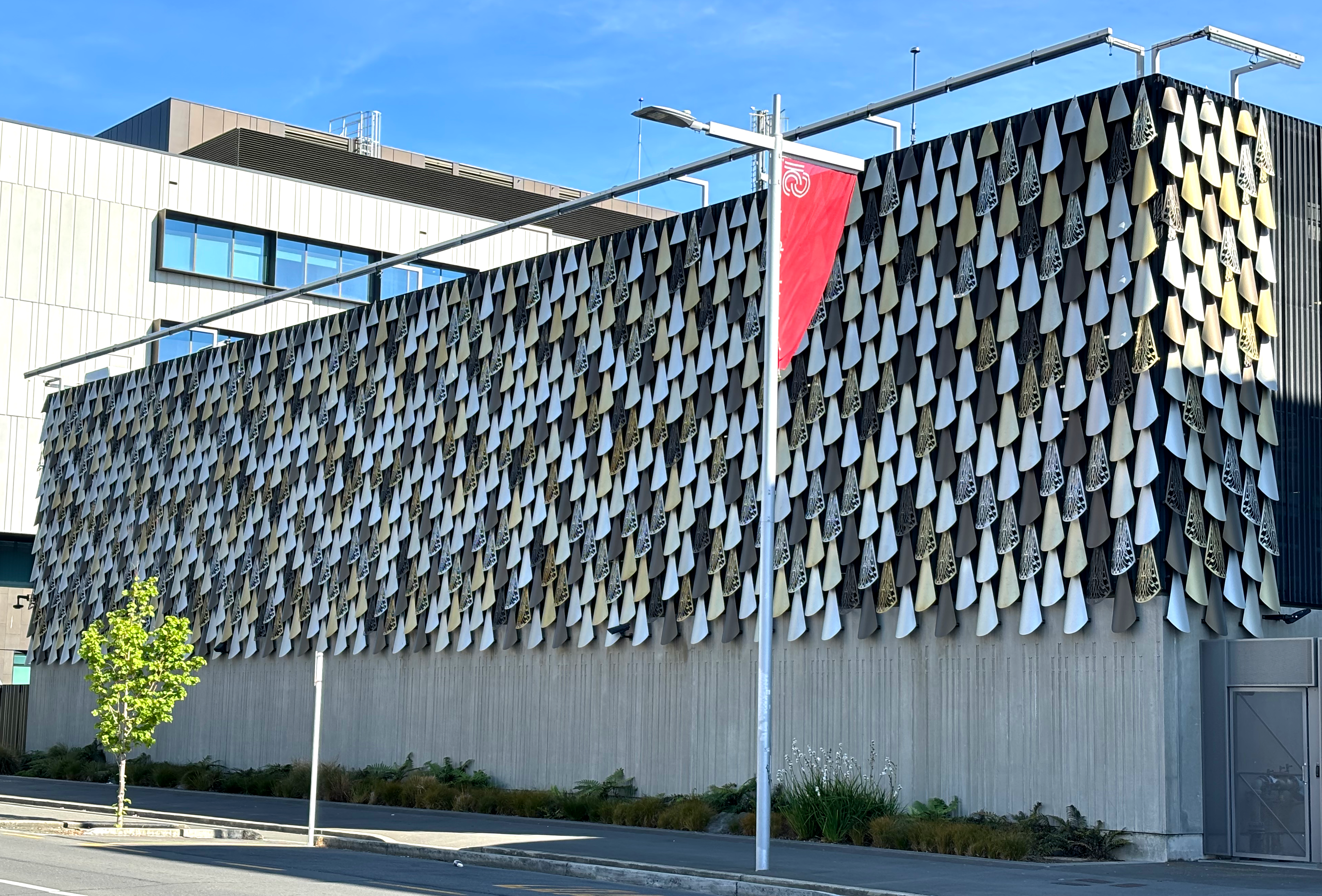
"Kahu Matarau" on Tuam Street

The exterior of the building is largely made of concrete and glass, softened with metal bronze accents. There are two artworks on the facade by artist Lonnie Hutchinson: "Kahu Matarau" which is made of 1400 anodised aluminium panels, and "Pikihuia i te ao, i te pō", a series of flat glass panels on the side of the building which also provide privacy and protect from sun. Cultural Māori designs are also featured in the interior, including tāniko patterns in timber ceiling panels, kōwhaiwhai designs in sandblasted basalt flooring, and the Puhoro pattern in window glazing, and carved door pulls made from the native black Maire, among other design pieces integrated into aspects of the building.

=== Awards ===
The Precinct had won several design awards. In 2018, it won both the Public Architecture and Interior Architecture categories at the NZIA Canterbury Awards. In 2019, the building received Commendation in the Public Architecture category of the international chapter of the Australian Institute of Architects.

== Construction ==
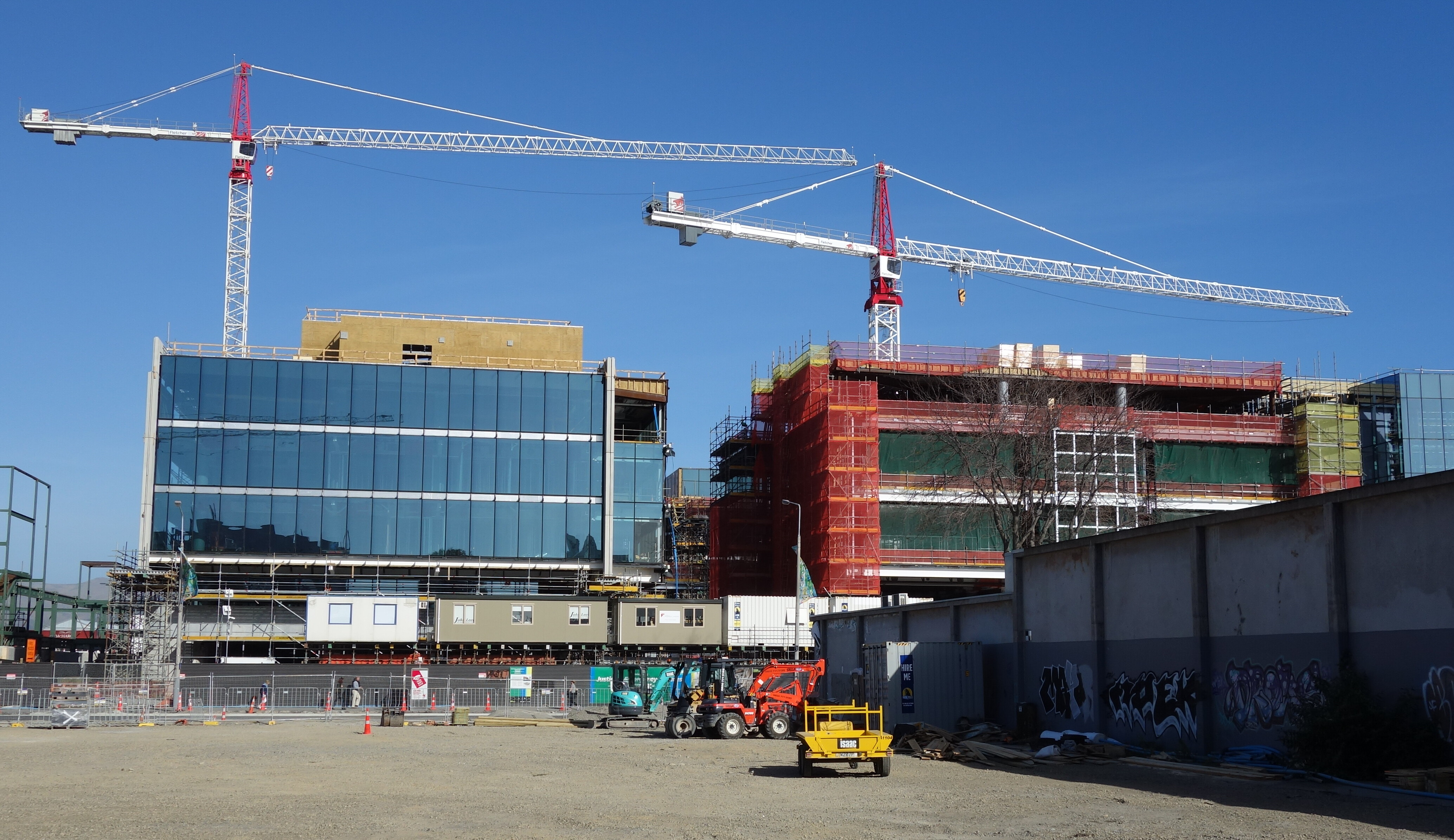
Construction of the Precinct in 2016

The project cost NZ$300 million to complete. Construction of the building was undertaken by Fletcher Construction. The groundbreaking ceremony happened on 22 January 2014, with Justice Minister Judith Collins and Prime Minister John Key turning the first ground. The initial work saw 20,000 cubic metres of soil excavated and 2,500 tonnes of cement used to create a 1.2 metre concrete base.

The complex is set on land between Colombo, Durham, Lichfield and Tuam Streets. A lane was created, running north through the property, connecting the latter two streets. Collins named the lane after Justice Sir Robert Chambers, who died unexpectedly in 2013 months before the announcement. Some criticised the lack of consultation in naming the lane, due to Chambers having little connection to Canterbury and a personal connection to Collins.

Fletcher Construction aimed to complete the project by 31 March 2017, but pushed the date back twice. In 2017, during the late stages of the construction, around 1000 people were working on site to complete the project. The building was completed in late 2017, and was officially opened on 12 September 2017 by Minister Amy Adams and Prime Minister Bill English. However, some further work was required to finish it, leading to a month-long delay before the building could be largely utilised.

=== Criticism of quality ===
In December 2019, two years after the building was opened, the Public Service Association claimed the building was too small, and criticised the quality of the project. It was reported that the building had undergone 1800 unplanned repairs at a cost of NZ$5.5 million, including replacing unsafe glass, fixing multiple leaks, and around 500 call-outs to repair the air conditioning system.

== Facilities and use ==
=== Law Courts and Ministry of Justice ===
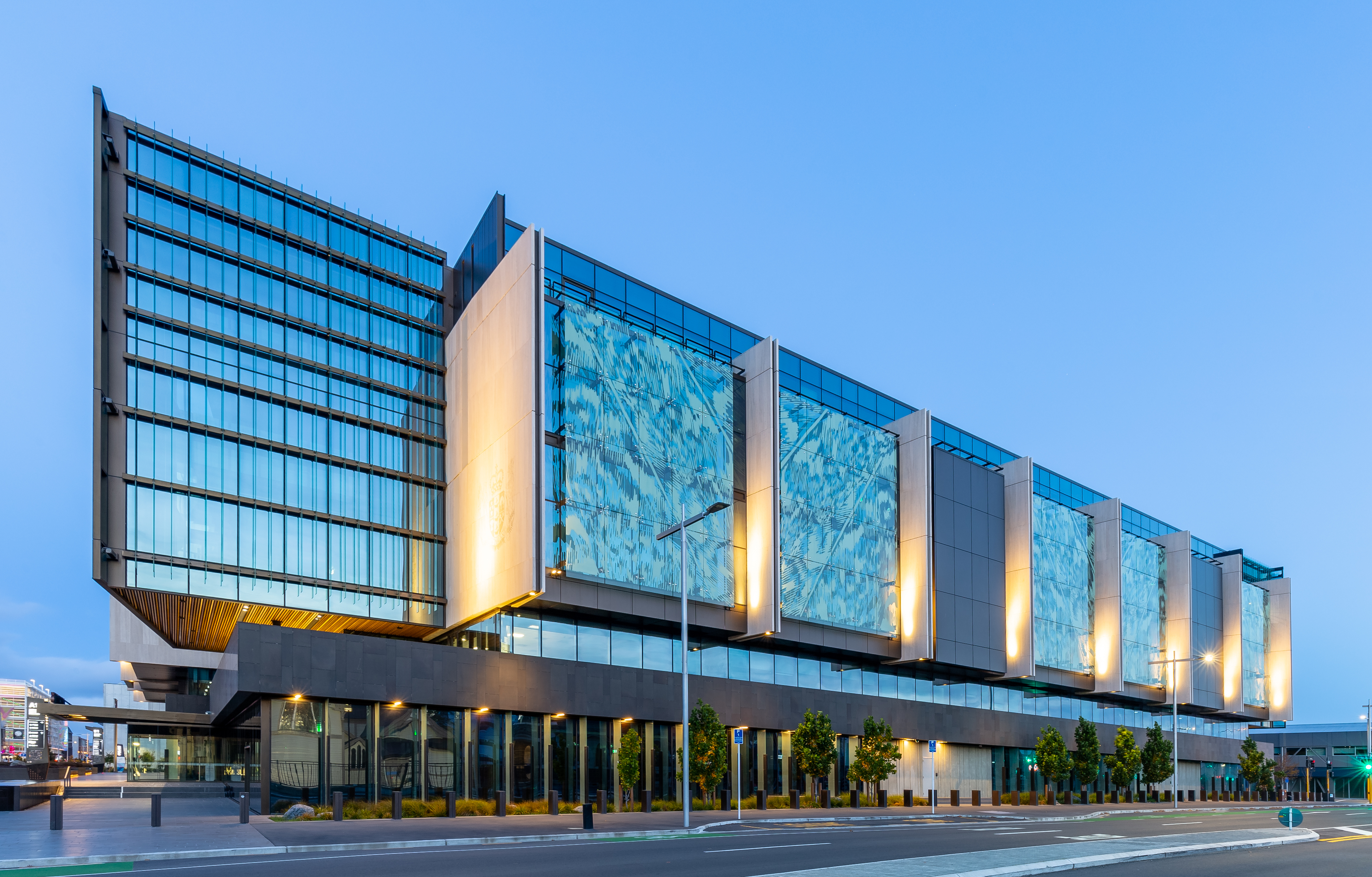
Law Courts in 2020

The Precinct houses the Christchurch branch of the Ministry of Justice and its related departments, including the Christchurch District Court. The courts and hearing rooms can be accessed from both Lichfield and Tuam Street. There are 19 courtrooms across three levels, with the Māori Land Court on the ground floor. The first level has minimal security and is open to the public. It rises 4.5 metres above the ground, where both cell blocks and foundation base isolators are located below. The New Zealand Police also operate in an area kept separate from the courts and judges.

=== Emergency Operations Centre ===
The police building houses the Emergency Operations Centre, an open space covering two floors. It has a wall of computer screens and operates as a command centre for use by emergency services and civil defence. It also has power generation capability and food and water provisions in case of a natural disaster.

=== Other tenants ===
Part of the building is used by Fire and Emergency New Zealand and St John New Zealand. However, they keep most of their vehicles offsite. The building also houses some offices for Christchurch City Council and Environment Canterbury as a secondary premises.
