= Templeton, New Zealand =

Settlement in Christchurch, New Zealand

Templeton
- Interactive map of Templeton
- Coordinates: 43°33′S 172°28′E
- Country: New Zealand
- Region: Canterbury
- Territorial authority: Christchurch City
- Ward: Hornby
- Community: Waipuna Halswell-Hornby-Riccarton
- Electorates: Wigram; Te Tai Tonga (Māori)

Government
  - Territorial Authority: Christchurch City Council
  - Regional council: Environment Canterbury
  - Mayor of Christchurch: Phil Mauger
  - Wigram MP: Dominik Yanzick
  - Te Tai Tonga MP: Mananui Ramsden

Area
  - Total: 0.90 km^{2} (0.35 sq mi)

Population (June 2025)
  - Total: 1,910
  - Density: 2,100/km^{2} (5,500/sq mi)

Templeton is a small town on the outskirts of Christchurch. Lying along State Highway 1. Templeton has been the centre of harness racing in Canterbury.

Its European history goes to over 140 years when it was a watering point for horses between Christchurch and the Selwyn River / Waikirikiri.

Templeton Hospital has had a major impact on the area, providing employment and controversy over many years.

More recently Ruapuna Park has created public debate regarding acceptable noise levels for residents near motor-sports venues.

Paparua to the north of Templeton has Christchurch's men's and women's prisons.

== Demographics ==
Templeton covers 0.90 km^{2} (0.35 sq mi). It had an estimated population of 1,910 as of June 2025, with a population density of 2,122 people per km^{2}.

Historical population
Year	Pop.	±% p.a.
2006	1,569	—
2013	1,788	+1.88%
2018	1,797	+0.10%
2023	1,827	+0.33%

Templeton had a population of 1,827 in the 2023 New Zealand census, an increase of 30 people (1.7%) since the 2018 census, and an increase of 39 people (2.2%) since the 2013 census. There were 906 males, 918 females, and 3 people of other genders in 699 dwellings. 2.3% of people identified as LGBTIQ+. The median age was 40.0 years (compared with 38.1 years nationally). There were 333 people (18.2%) aged under 15 years, 288 (15.8%) aged 15 to 29, 903 (49.4%) aged 30 to 64, and 306 (16.7%) aged 65 or older.

People could identify as more than one ethnicity. The results were 84.6% European (Pākehā); 13.6% Māori; 4.3% Pasifika; 9.7% Asian; 0.7% Middle Eastern, Latin American and African New Zealanders (MELAA); and 3.0% other, which includes people giving their ethnicity as "New Zealander". English was spoken by 96.6%, Māori by 2.3%, Samoan by 0.7%, and other languages by 9.5%. No language could be spoken by 2.5% (e.g. too young to talk). New Zealand Sign Language was known by 1.0%. The percentage of people born overseas was 16.6, compared with 28.8% nationally.

Religious affiliations were 30.5% Christian, 1.5% Hindu, 0.5% Islam, 0.2% Māori religious beliefs, 0.8% Buddhist, 0.3% New Age, and 1.6% other religions. People who answered that they had no religion were 58.5%, and 6.1% of people did not answer the census question.

Of those at least 15 years old, 231 (15.5%) people had a bachelor's or higher degree, 837 (56.0%) had a post-high school certificate or diploma, and 417 (27.9%) people exclusively held high school qualifications. The median income was $47,500, compared with $41,500 nationally. 117 people (7.8%) earned over $100,000 compared to 12.1% nationally. The employment status of those at least 15 was 855 (57.2%) full-time, 198 (13.3%) part-time, and 18 (1.2%) unemployed.

== Education ==
Templeton School is a full primary school catering for years 1 to 8. It had a roll of 283 as of July 2026. The school opened in 1962, but its predecessors started in 1861.

== Climate ==
Climate data for Templeton (1951–1980)
Month	Jan	Feb	Mar	Apr	May	Jun	Jul	Aug	Sep	Oct	Nov	Dec	Year
Mean daily maximum °C (°F)	21.8 (71.2)	21.9 (71.4)	20.0 (68.0)	17.0 (62.6)	13.5 (56.3)	10.5 (50.9)	10.3 (50.5)	11.7 (53.1)	14.2 (57.6)	16.4 (61.5)	18.7 (65.7)	20.2 (68.4)	16.3 (61.4)
Daily mean °C (°F)	16.4 (61.5)	16.3 (61.3)	14.9 (58.8)	11.9 (53.4)	8.9 (48.0)	5.9 (42.6)	5.7 (42.3)	7.0 (44.6)	9.1 (48.4)	11.1 (52.0)	13.1 (55.6)	15.1 (59.2)	11.3 (52.3)
Mean daily minimum °C (°F)	10.9 (51.6)	10.7 (51.3)	9.8 (49.6)	6.7 (44.1)	4.2 (39.6)	1.3 (34.3)	1.0 (33.8)	2.3 (36.1)	3.9 (39.0)	5.7 (42.3)	7.4 (45.3)	9.9 (49.8)	6.1 (43.1)
Source: NIWA

== Notable residents ==
- Roger Drayton (1925–1986), born in Templeton; Labour MP (1969–1978)
- David Jones (1874–1941), born in Templeton; Minister of Agriculture (1931–1932)
