= Tūranga =

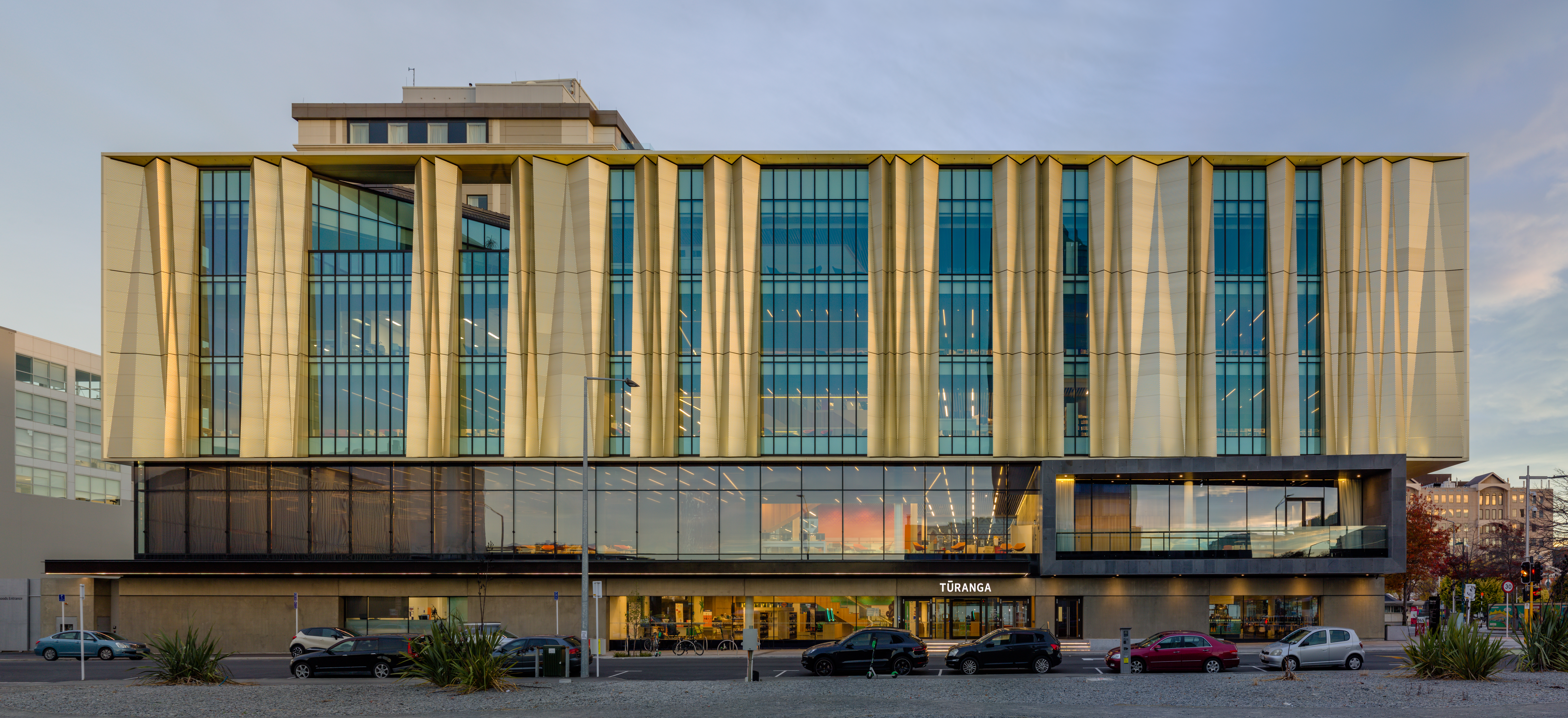
- Tūranga in April 2019
- Interactive map of the Tūranga area

General information
- Type: Library
- Location: Christchurch Central City, Corner of Gloucester Street, Colombo Street, and Cathedral Square, Christchurch, New Zealand
- Coordinates: 43°31′48″S 172°38′13″E
- Construction started: 22 February 2016; 10 years ago (Groundworks)
- Opened: 12 October 2018; 7 years ago
- Cost: NZ$102.61m
- Owner: Christchurch City Council

Technical details
- Floor count: Five storeys

Design and construction
- Architects: Architectus, Schmidt Hammer Lassen
- Structural engineer: LewisBradford Consulting Engineers
- Main contractor: Southbase Construction

Tūranga is the public library located in Central Christchurch, New Zealand. It opened on 12 October 2018 and replaced the nearby Christchurch Central Library that was closed on the day of the 2011 Christchurch earthquake.

== Location and prior buildings ==
Tūranga is located in the north-eastern quadrant of Cathedral Square and fronts Gloucester and Colombo Streets. The original wooden building on the site was demolished in 1885; the then-owner Fred Hobbs replaced it with a substantial building of permanent materials that became known as Cathedral Chambers. The location had earlier become known as Hobbs' Corner after its prominent owner who had painted his name on the wooden building. Cathedral Chambers was replaced with the Colonial Mutual Limited (or CML) building in 1975, so named after its main tenant. This office building was later converted to a hotel and was last known as the Camelot Hotel.

== History ==
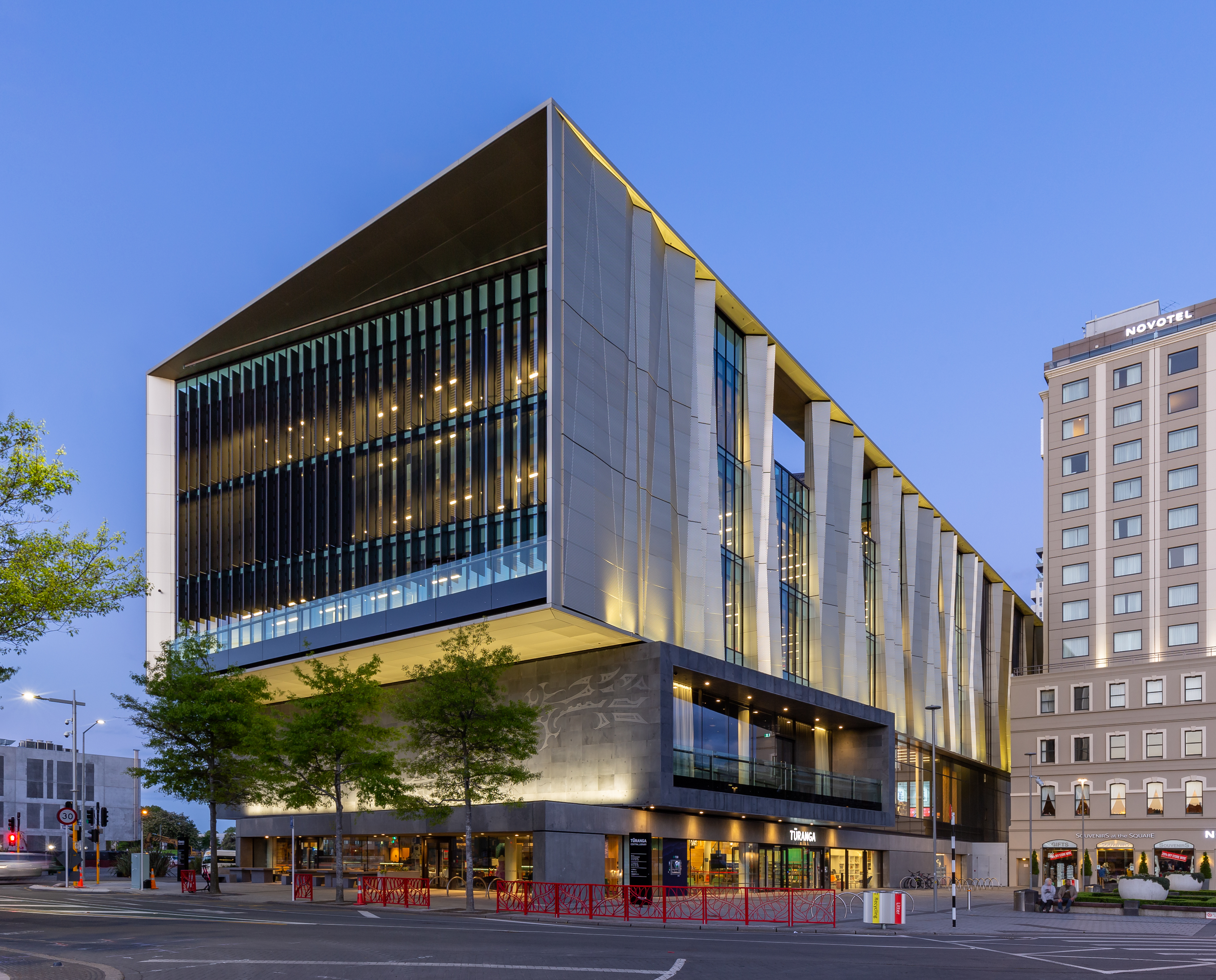
Tūranga as seen from Cathedral Square, October 2020

The previous Central library closed with the 2011 Christchurch earthquake as the Christchurch Central City was cordoned off. The 2012 Christchurch Central Recovery Plan, commonly referred to as the Blueprint, identified 17 anchor projects, including a new central library. Through the Blueprint, the responsibility for delivering the building was assigned to Christchurch City Council. Partners for the delivery were Ngāi Tahu and the Canterbury Earthquake Recovery Authority (CERA). The indicative project delivery schedule in the Blueprint, developed on behalf of CERA, showed a proposed opening of the new library during the third quarter of 2015. In a publication titled Anchor Projects Overview updated in June 2014, the opening date was shown as January 2017. In a pamphlet published by CERA in November 2014, the anticipated opening date was shown for the third quarter of 2017.

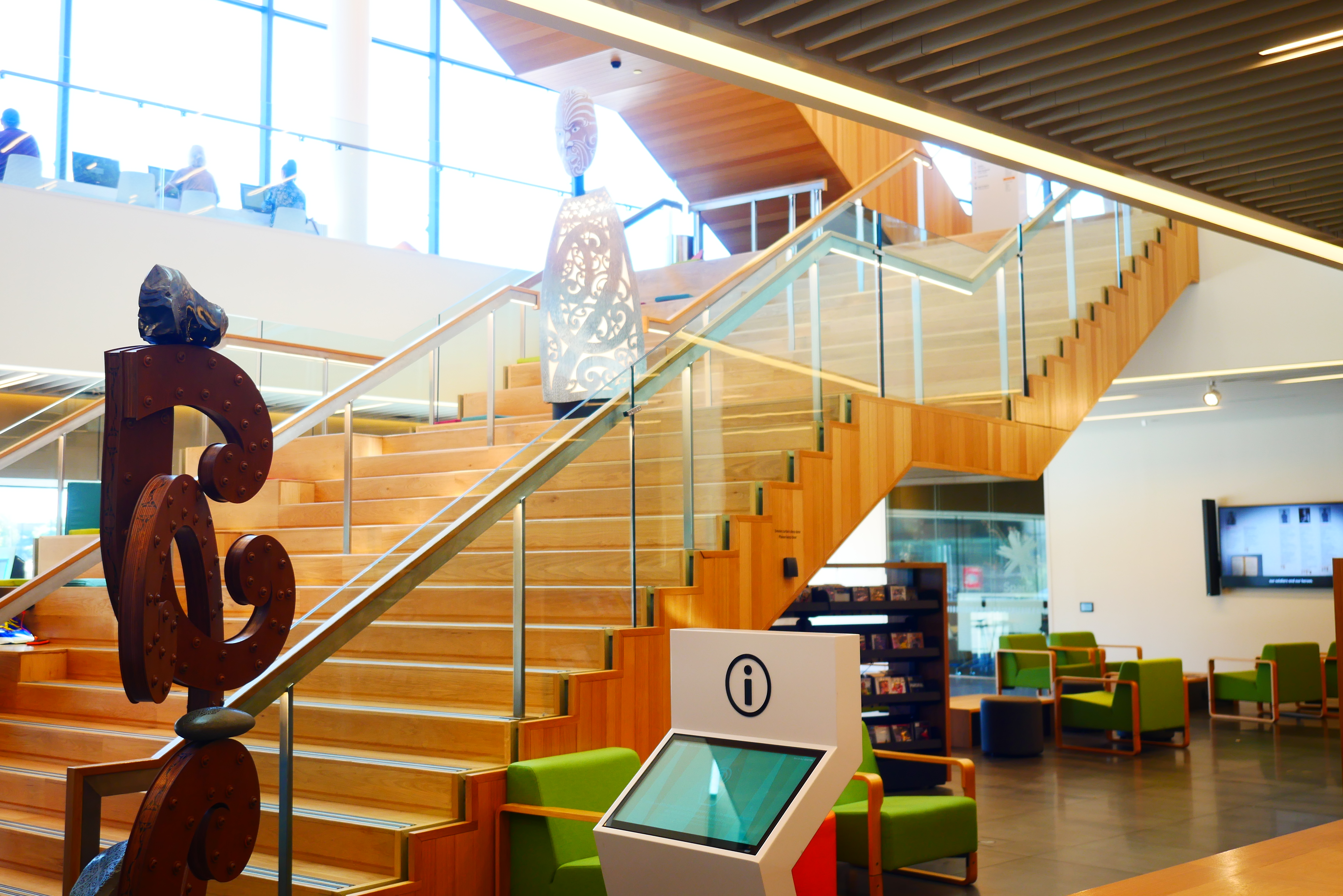
The interior of Tūranga, with the main stairs leading to the children's area, November 2019

On 26 March 2015, plans for a new $85 million dollar library were unveiled to city councillors. The new library, named Tūranga, is one-third larger than the previous library, the largest library in the South Island and the third-largest in New Zealand, behind Auckland and Wellington's central libraries. The replacement library was designed by both Architectus, a New Zealand architecture firm, and Schmidt Hammer Lassen, an award-winning Danish architecture firm. The building's design is inspired by the golden hues reflected upon the Port Hills, which are an important part in Christchurch's cityscape.

Soon after construction started on the new library, the Christchurch City Council increased their contribution to the library from $60 million to $95 million. This controversial cost increase was due to multiple factors, such as acquiring land and inflation.

The library was opened to the public on 12 October 2018, with over 13,000 people visiting on its opening weekend.

The library has won a number of awards.

== Naming ==
The library's name was gifted by Te Ngāi Tūāhuriri rūnanga. It makes reference to Whitireia, the Te Reo name for Cathedral Square. Paikea was an ancestor of Ngāi Tahu and Whitireia was the name of his house located in Tūranga, the original name for Gisborne in the North Island. The name thus values the location where Paikea's house was located. Christchurch city councillors approved the name in September 2017. There was an initial intention to give the library an English descriptor of "A Place of Discovery" but this idea was dropped and it is just called Tūranga.

== Facilities ==
Facilities include:

- $1.2 million 7m-long touch-sensitive Discovery Wall offering an interactive digital picture of Christchurch
- Café
- 200-seat community arena
- Activity rooms
- Archives
- Crafts facilities
- 3D printing facilities
- Exhibition space
- Study spaces
- Meeting rooms
- Children’s play area with LED lightshow.

Computing and technology facilities include:

- Public computers with free internet access
- Free Wi-Fi
- PlayStations
- Virtual reality (VR) headsets and gaming
- Printing and photocopying
- Scan to email or USB
- Production and audio visual studios.
