= WSP New Zealand =

Engineering services consulting firm

- Founded: 1876
- Headquarters: Wellington, New Zealand
- Services: Transportation; Buildings; Water and environmental; Other infrastructure
- Revenue: NZ$286,654,000 (2011)
- Operating income: NZ$31,233,000 (2011)
- Net income: NZ$24,091,000 (2011)
- Total assets: NZ$187,803,000 (2011)
- Total equity: NZ$116,994,000 (2011)
- Number of employees: 3,000 (2013)
- Subsidiaries: Opus International Consultants Holdings (UK) Ltd; Opus International Consultants (Canada) Ltd; Opus International Consultants (PCA) Pty Ltd; Opus International Pty Ltd; Opus International Consultants A Limited Partnership; Opus International Consultants (OPC) Ltd; Opus International Consultants Sdn Bhd; Kejuruteraan Opus Sdn Bhd; Opus International Consultants Pte Ltd
- Website: wsp.com/en-nz

WSP New Zealand Ltd is a global engineering professional services consulting firm based in New Zealand and owned by Canadian multinational WSP Global. Until October 2019 it traded as WSP Opus.

The New Zealand operation has 40 offices across the country and offers professional consultancy services, covering property and buildings, environment, power and water, transport, health and safety, architecture, sustainability and climate change, and research.

== WSP history ==
=== Opus ===
Opus's origins can be traced to the Ministry of Works and Development, a New Zealand government entity that was established in 1876. The Ministry was corporatised in 1988 and became Works and Development Services Corporation, a state-owned enterprise, with its consultancy subsidiary known as Works Consultancy Services Corporation NZ Limited.

In 1996, Kinta Kellas purchased the consultancy business and it was rebranded as Opus International Consultants Limited the following year. From 2002 onwards, Opus developed its global markets through a series of acquisitions. In 2007, it was listed on the New Zealand Stock Exchange.

In 2016 Opus was named Company of the Year by New Civil Engineer (NCE) at that year's NCE100 Awards in London. The judges decided Opus as the winner after scoring the company high across all of the competition's categories of Engineering equality, Future engineer, World view, Future tech, and Technical excellence.

=== WSP Global ===
New-York professional services firm Parsons Brinckerhoff was purchased by WSP Global in October 2014. Since then WSP has become one of the largest professional services firms in the world, with approximately 83,000 employees in 550 offices serving in 40 countries, and has acquired over 100 companies. WSP offers professional services in rail and transport, property and buildings, environment, energy, industry, and resources.

In 2017 WSP Global took over Opus, which was subsequently delisted from the New Zealand Stock Exchange. In 2018 Opus's trading name was changed to WSP Opus, a name under which it traded until October 2019. On 15 October 2019, Opus International Consultants Limited changed its legal name to WSP New Zealand Limited and was branded as WSP.

== Notable New Zealand projects ==
=== Waterview Connection Project ===
WSP | Parsons Brinckerhoff joined the NZ Transport Agency, Fletcher Construction, McConnell Dowell, Beca, Tonkin + Taylor and Obayashi Corporation to form the Well-Connected Alliance.

WSP Opus was appointed as design partners for the $NZ1.4B Waterview Connection; the final link in Auckland's Western Ring Route and the largest roading project ever undertaken in New Zealand.

The route included two 2.4 km (1.5 mi) twin tunnels and associated motorway and ramp infrastructure, along with the establishment of significant community facilities. Australasia's largest custom-built tunnel boring machine, Alice, was used in the construction of the tunnel. With a cutting diameter of 14.4 m (47 ft) it is the tenth largest machine of its kind ever built.

In addition to design management, WSP provided tunnel; fire and life safety; geotechnical, mechanical, and electrical systems design services; and design support during construction. Construction for the Waterview Tunnel started in 2011 and was completed by June 2017.

=== Auckland Harbour Bridge ===
The Auckland Harbour Bridge is an eight-lane motorway bridge over the Waitematā Harbour in Auckland. It joins St Marys Bay in the south with Northcote in North Shore. It is part of State Highway 1 and the Auckland Northern Motorway. As part of the Auckland Harbour Bridge Alliance (AHBA), WSP Opus was commissioned to provide a 30-year coating management strategy for the Auckland Harbour Bridge. The strategy was completed and initiated in 2014.

- In 2015 WSP Opus trials world-first quick-set repair material for surface defects.
- In 2018 WSP Opus installs new epoxy asphalt road surfacing membrane.
- In 2018 WSP Opus undertakes design of new light poles and installation of new LEDs.

=== West Winds Wind Farm ===
West Winds Wind Farm comprises 62 wind turbines and generates up to 142.6 MW of electricity. The farm is located at Mākara in the Wellington Region, New Zealand's windiest region. The wind farm is owned by Meridian Energy and can generate enough electricity each year for about 73,000 New Zealand homes.

WSP Opus provided support from the earliest stages of feasibility to the wind farm's final opening. Services included feasibility assessments, support at Environment Court hearings, design support, and geotechnical monitoring of earthworks. Work started in 2007 and was completed by December 2009.

=== City Rail Link ===
The City Rail Link (CRL) is the largest-ever infrastructure project to be undertaken in New Zealand.

The $NZ 4.4 billion project under construction in Auckland involves creating a 3.5 km (2.2 mi) long double-track rail tunnel underneath Britomart Transport Centre and Mount Eden Railway Station; the building of two new stations, at Aotea Square and Karangahape Road; and conversion of Britomart's existing terminus station into a through-station to Mount Eden Station, which will serve as an interchange between the new CRL line and the existing Western Line. WSP Opus joined Vinci Construction Grands, Projets S.A.S, Downer NZ Ltd, Soletanche Bachy International NZ Limited, AECOM New Zealand Limited and Tonkin+Taylor Limited to form the Link Alliance in 2019.

In October 2018, a partnership between RCR Tomlinson and WSP Opus was awarded the contract to deliver the C7 programme of work to deliver underground rail systems including rail tracks, signalling, overhead lines, control system rooms, communications, and building works. In November 2018, RCR Tomlinson announced administration and was placed in a trading halt on 12 November 2018. In August 2019 the Link Alliance was awarded the contract to deliver the C3 main works for CRL, including the stations and tunnel. CRL will be complete in 2024.

=== Te Ahu a Turanga: Manawatū Tararua Highway ===
In September 2019, the NZ Transport Agency and Palmerston North City Council announced development plans for the Te Ahu a Turanga: Manawatū Tararua Highway. The $NZ 620 million project will accommodate a new state highway connection to replace the closed State Highway 3 (SH3) Manawatū Gorge route. This 11.5 km (7.1 mi) corridor crosses the Ruahine Ranges immediately north of the Manawatū Gorge and south of Saddle Road.

The project will be delivered by the Advance Alliance which is made up of WSP Opus, Fulton Hogan, HEB, and Aurecon. WSP will provide roading, structural and geotechnical design, drainage design, hydrological modelling, planning and consenting, road lighting, and electrical disciplines.

=== Dunedin Hospital redevelopment ===
Dunedin Hospital is the largest public hospital south of Christchurch. It has over 300 beds and is operated by the Southern District Health Board (SDHB). On 4 May 2018, Health Minister, David Clark, announced that the Government would rebuild and extend the hospital. The new hospital will provide 396 inpatient beds (later increasing to 454 by 2043), and 61-daybeds.

On 1 November 2018, the Ministry purchased a large block of land from the former Cadbury factory site in the central city to be used for the Dunedin Hospital Redevelopment. In 2019 the SDHB released the official design plans for the redevelopment of Dunedin Hospital. On 17 May 2019, the SDHB announced that WSP Opus will provide the demolition property and building survey, and Underground Overground Archaeology continues to provide heritage advice. The main demolition works are scheduled for early 2020 with project completion forecast for 2030.
