= Charles Luney =

New Zealand builder (1905–2006)

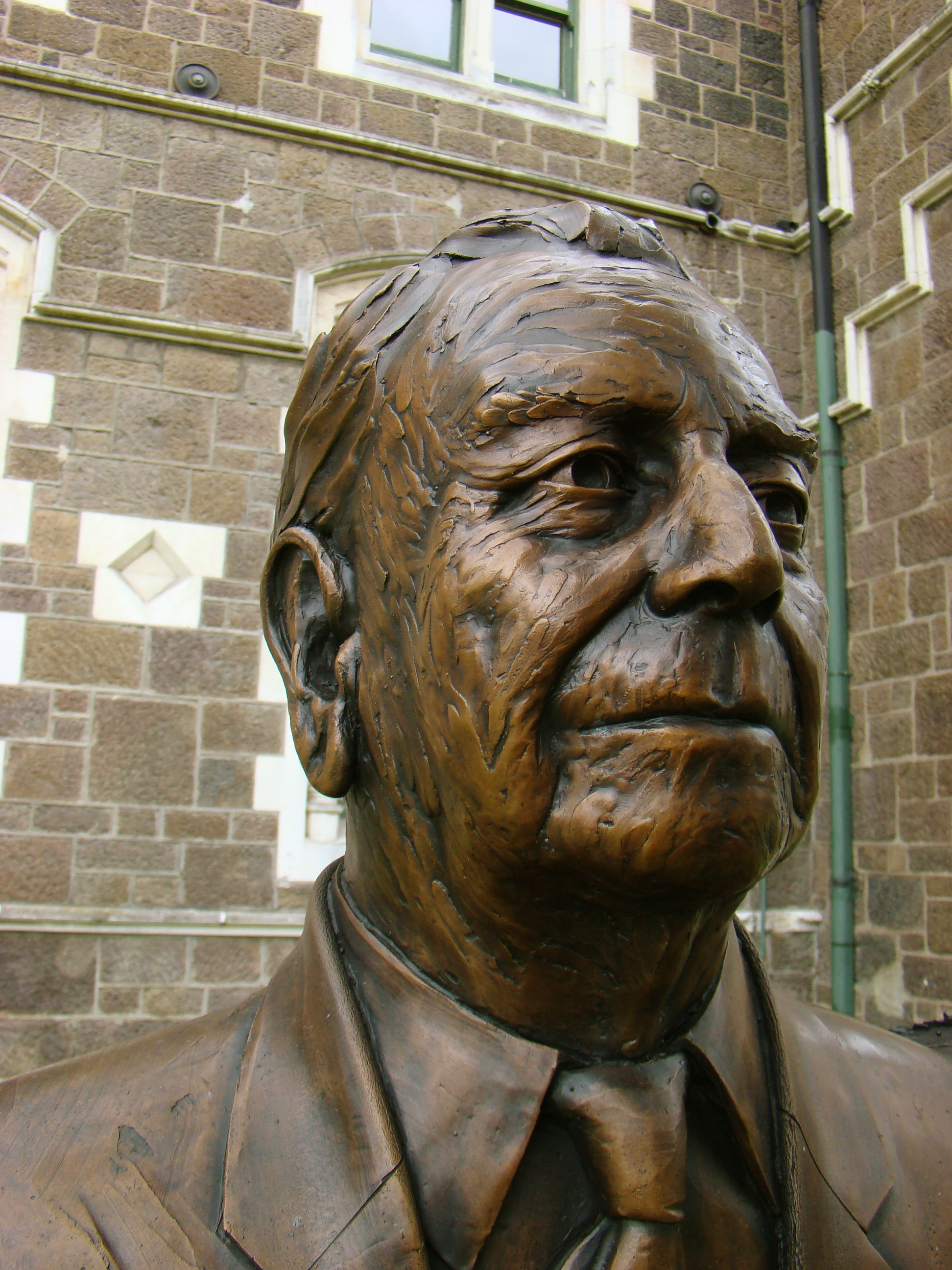
Bronze bust of Charles Luney

Charles Seymour "Chas" Luney CNZM QSO (28 June 1905 – 18 November 2006), was a New Zealand builder and company director. He is notable for the many important buildings that his company constructed in Christchurch, of which his favourite was Christchurch Town Hall. His professional career spanned 80 years.

== Early life ==
Luney was born in Lyttelton. His father was a carpenter who had immigrated from Canada. The family struggled financially and Luney attended several primary schools, including one in Canada for one year. He attended Christchurch Boys' High School for two years and was then apprenticed as a joiner.

Two events in his early life shaped Luney. He was unjustly partly held responsible for the death of his younger brother, and it made him determined to care for his family. Missing Scout camp because his father could not afford the ten shillings made him value money and realise that it only came from effort. He saved carefully and persistently all his life and he hated unnecessary wastage.

== Family ==
Luney met his wife to be in 1923 at the Christchurch Show. He employed her as office secretary and office manager and one of his intentions with that was to keep other men away from her. They married in 1930 and had four daughters.

== Professional career ==
Luney founded his own firm, C S Luney Ltd, in 1926 with £300 he saved up himself. The company has never had an overdraft facility, which possibly prevented it from going bankrupt during the Great Depression in the 1930s. In the early years the company's projects were mainly garages for the growing number of car owners in Christchurch. In 1930 the firm completed its first major project, the Radiant Hall (now known as the Repertory Theatre, a Category II heritage building), which had been financed by Thomas Edmonds, the manufacturer of Edmonds Baking Powder. In 1935 the company built two villas at Templeton Hospital.

The firm continued to grow and went on to build a number of prominent Christchurch buildings, many designed by Warren and Mahoney. Luney was appointed a Companion of the Queen's Service Order for public services in the 1983 New Year Honours, and a Companion of the New Zealand Order of Merit, for services to the building industry and the community, in the 1997 New Year Honours. Luney was still supervising construction work in his 90s. Miles Warren said of him that he was a "pressure-wave of energy" and he called him "one of the great characters of Christchurch".

His favourite project was the Christchurch Town Hall, which was built between 1969 and 1972. For the construction of the Westpac Centre in Addington, he used "every piece of scaffolding available in the South Island", according to his biographer John Coley.

One of the few surviving buildings from the earthquakes was the James Hight Library at the University that his firm built between 1970 and 1974.

== Death and commemoration ==
Luney died on 18 November 2006, aged 101. His wife, who had died before him in 2001, had said of him that he was "too busy to grow old". He was survived by their four daughters, twelve grandchildren and 10 great-grandchildren. During his lifetime, Luney was chosen to be included in the Twelve Local Heroes sculpture on Worcester Boulevard in front of the Christchurch Arts Centre.

"Charles Luney - Master Builder" directed by Samuel A. Miller. The Film, completed in Christchurch, New Zealand, includes interviews with C.S. Luney in 2003. The earthquakes delayed production, but the film has been released. The film was selected for the UK's Sheffield Doc/Fest Videotheque.

" Maurice and I", the 2024 film by Christchurch directors Rick Harvie and Jane Mahoney of Belmont Films, honoured the work of Charles Luney as the preferred builder of Miles Warren and Maurice Mahoney of Warren and Mahoney; and his work on the Christchurch Town Hall.

== Notable buildings ==
Luney's firm has constructed the following notable buildings in Christchurch:

- Christchurch City Libraries
- Christchurch Town Hall
- Christchurch Hospital refurbishment
- Princess Margaret Hospital
- CBS Canterbury Arena
