= Robin Dudding =

New Zealand editor and journalist

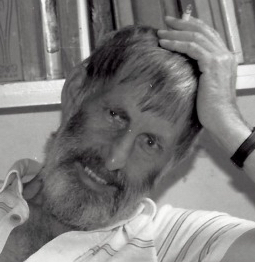
Robin Dudding in the 1990s.

Robin Nelson Dudding (7 December 1935 – 21 April 2008) was a New Zealand literary editor and journalist who founded the influential literary journal Islands (1972–1988).

He edited the literary journals Mate (1957–1966) and Landfall (1966–1972). He also published several novels, poetry, and essay collections. His editorial work provided many New Zealand writers with their first published outlets.

== Background ==
Dudding was born in Hastings in the Hawke’s Bay, son of Ernest, a baker, and Winifred (née Hinton) a schoolteacher. He attended Hastings High School, where he developed an interest in writing and literature.

== Career ==
Dudding was a cadet reporter at the Hawke's Bay Herald-Tribune from 1952 until moving to Auckland in the mid-1950s. He joined the Auckland Star, after a short time working as a freelance “seagull” labourer on the wharves. In 1959 he left the Star to train as a primary school teacher.

While still a reporter, Dudding fell in with the Auckland literary set, whose gatherings revolved around the Queen’s Ferry pub in the central city. In 1957 he took over the co-editorship, and then the full editorship, of the magazine Mate, whose first edition had been edited by the poet Kevin Ireland. Contributions to Mate 2 included Barry Crump’s first published story, as well as writing by Maurice Gee, Frank Sargeson and Ireland. Mate was produced from Dudding’s home in Torbay on Auckland’s North Shore, and he supported his unpaid literary endeavours and his growing family with full-time work as a reporter, and later teacher.

In 1966 Dudding moved to Christchurch to take over the editorship of literary journal Landfall from founder Charles Brasch, and to be general editor of the Caxton Press. In 1972 he was fired from Caxton and founded his own magazine, Islands, once again supporting literary editing with other work, including freelance editing, teaching and gardening. The magazine was swiftly recognised as the “pre-eminent literary periodical of the 1970s”, and was published by Dudding, with occasional pauses, until 1988. There were 38 issues in all.

From the mid-1980s Dudding wrote the Bookmarks column for the New Zealand Listener and was later a subeditor for the magazine. In 2003 he was guest editor of the annual online anthology Best New Zealand Poems.

== Awards and prizes ==
In 1976, an issue of Islands was devoted to the Ian Wedde novel Dick Seddon’s Great Dive, which won the 1977 Book Award for Fiction. The following year, Dudding published Kevin Ireland’s poetry collection Literary Cartoons, which won the 1979 Book Award for Poetry. Dudding was awarded Auckland University’s first Literary Fellowship in 1979.

In April 2008 he was awarded an honorary doctorate for literature by Auckland University, but died of emphysema two days before the ceremony. His award was received on his behalf by his family.

== Personal ==
Dudding married Lois Yvonne Miller in 1958. They had five daughters and a son. He was an enthusiastic gardener and chicken breeder. He was a heavy smoker until his late 50s.

In November 2016 Victoria University Press published a memoir about Dudding by his journalist son Adam Dudding, entitled My Father's Island, which is shortlisted in the general non-fiction category of the Ockham New Zealand Book Awards.

== Periodicals as editor ==
- Mate (editions 2–14) 1958–66
- Landfall (editions 81–101) 1966–72
- Islands (editions 1–38) 1972–88
- Best New Zealand Poems 2003

== Books as editor ==
- Salvation Jones by Barry Mitcalfe, 1962
- Dick Seddon’s Great Dive (Islands 16) by Ian Wedde, 1967
- Literary Cartoons by Kevin Ireland, 1977
- Beginnings: New Zealand Writers Tell How They Began, 1980
- The Year of The Comet by Kevin Ireland, 1986
