= Tomorrow (New Zealand magazine) =

Left-wing magazine (1934–1940)

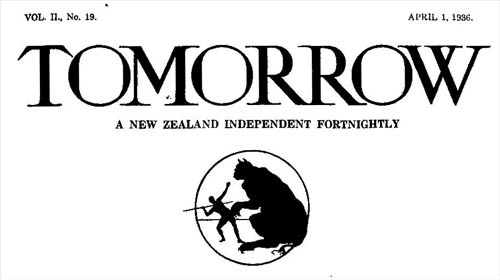
- 1 April 1936 cover
- Editor: Kennaway Henderson
- Frequency: Weekly until March 1936, then fortnightly
- Circulation: 300–1,000
- First issue: January 1934
- Final issue: May 1940
- Country: New Zealand

Tomorrow was a left-wing magazine in New Zealand from 1934 to 1940, edited by Kennaway Henderson.

== History and content ==
The magazine was established in 1934 by Henderson, who was an artist and an illustrator, together with Frederick Sinclaire and H. Winston Rhodes, both English academics from Canterbury College, and printer Denis Glover who was in the midst of establishing his own publisher, Caxton Press. It was Henderson's idea to start the magazine, having been inspired by the British socialist magazine The New Age.

The magazine largely published political opinions and works by contributors like Sinclaire, Noel Pharazyn, W. B. Sutch and John A. Lee. Under Rhodes' and Glover's influence, however, it also became a vehicle for New Zealand literary works. The magazine published thirty of Frank Sargeson's early stories, as well as works by Roderick Finlayson, R. A. K. Mason, Rex Fairburn, Allen Curnow and Denis Glover. Leading Australian literary critic Nettie Palmer contributed a regular series titled "Australian Note Book".

The magazine had a limited budget because Henderson and the magazine's other founders were philosophically opposed to the concept of advertising, and most of the funds to publish the magazine came from advance subscriptions. In early 1935 the magazine had to cease production for a temporary period due to a libel suit. Rhodes later said that the magazine only began to make a profit in late 1939, shortly before it was closed down in 1940. The reason for the magazine's closure was that no printers were willing to print it following the government's introduction of wartime regulations that enabled publications to be banned for publishing subversive material.

== Legacy ==
Tomorrow was the first left-wing publication of its kind in New Zealand. Historian Rachel Barrowman has described it as "the principal forum in New Zealand for the discussion of issues and international developments of left-wing culture in the 1930s". Writer Charles Brasch thought it "more influential than any New Zealand periodical before or since", though he considered Henderson's cartoons "juvenile". The Oxford Companion to New Zealand Literature describes it as "one of the most important periodicals of literary interest" before the introduction of Landfall in 1947.
