= Toss Woollaston =

New Zealand painter (1910–1998)

Sir Toss Woollaston
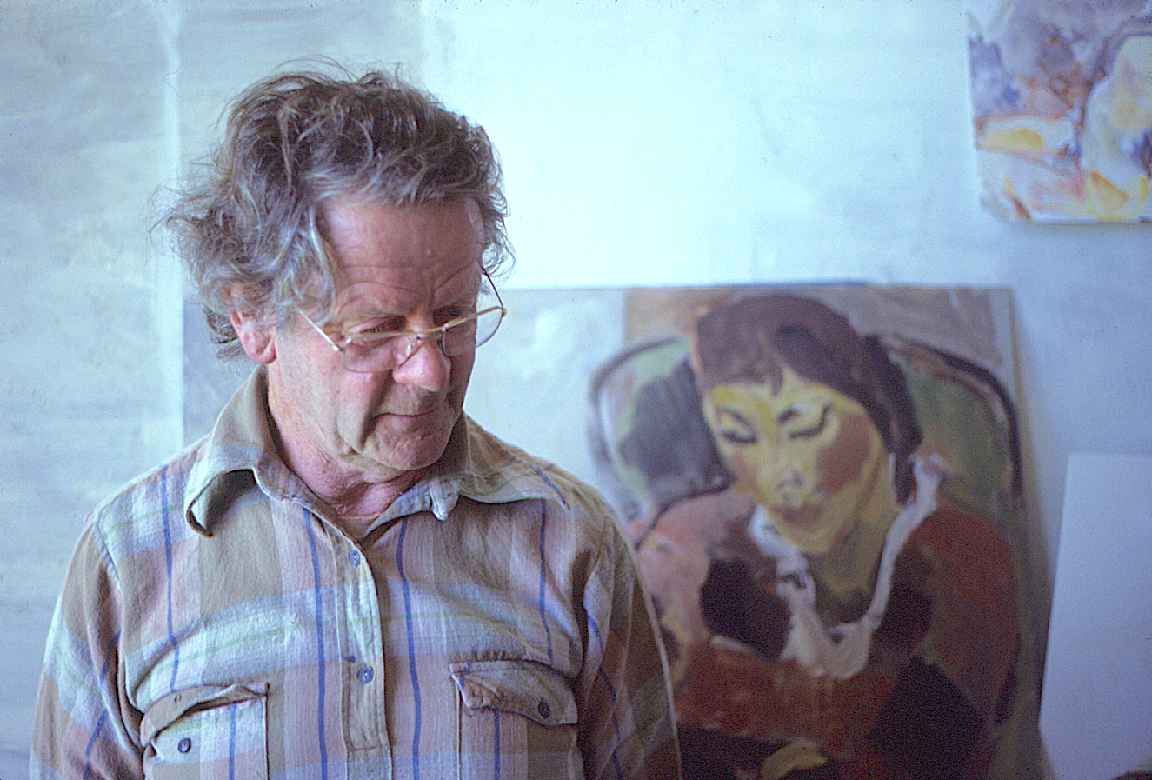
- Toss Woollaston in his Riwaka studio, 1979
- Born: Mountford Tosswill Woollaston; 11 April 1910; Toko, Taranaki, New Zealand
- Died: 30 August 1998 (aged 88); Upper Moutere, New Zealand
- Spouse: Edith Winifred Alexander (m. 1936; died 1987)
- Relatives: Philip Woollaston (son); Anna Caselberg (daughter); John Caselberg (son-in-law)

Sir Mountford Tosswill "Toss" Woollaston (11 April 1910 – 30 August 1998) was a New Zealand artist. He is regarded as one of the most important New Zealand painters of the 20th century.

== Life ==
Born in Toko, Taranaki in 1910, Woollaston attended primary school at Stratford, and then Stratford Technical High School. In 1931 he studied art at the Canterbury School of Art in Christchurch where one of his teachers was Margaret Stoddart. He became interested in modernism after moving to Dunedin to study with R N Field at the art school attached to the King Edward Technical College. As Woollaston noted in his autobiography Sage Tea, Field's work ‘conveyed directly, without the intervention of subject, the excitement of the act of painting'.

While at art school, Woollaston met Rodney Kennedy and the two became lovers and remained life-long friends after Woollaston's marriage in 1936 to Edith Alexander, who had also been an art student in Dunedin. Edith raised their four children.

Kennedy went on to become a driving force of avant garde arts in Dunedin and one of the country's leading drama producers. He was an early supporter and collector of Woollaston's work and became the long-term partner of Charles Brasch, another passionate collector of contemporary New Zealand art. In 1934 Woollaston and his family settled at Māpua, near Nelson, but remained part of a close circle of local artists and writers which included Colin McCahon, Ursula Bethell, Charles Brasch and Ron O'Reilly. Between them they provided ongoing, moral, critical and financial support. In 1936 Woollaston was invited to exhibit with The Group in Christchurch for the first time, becoming a member in 1940. He went on to participate in 27 exhibitions of The Group and was included in the 1977 retrospective.

As a full-time orchard worker Woollaston was exempted from enlistment in World War II and spent most of the forties in the Māpua area. After the War, in 1950, the family moved to Greymouth and the landscape of the West Coast became a major feature of Woollaston's work. He earned his living as a Rawleighs salesman, although the pressure of the job gave him little time for painting. Concerned at Woollaston being side-tracked by his art, the Rawleighs management once cautioned him, that while ‘art might be the cream on your coffee Rawleighs is your bread and butter’. An annual Fellowship awarded by the Federation of New Zealand Art Societies in 1958 enabled him to travel to Australia where he studied old Master paintings at the National Gallery of Victoria. The Gallery was impressed by Woollaston's work and purchased the painting Edith with a Lamp along with a number of drawings he had made of works from the Gallery's collection including Analytical study of Poussin's 'Crossing of the Red Sea'.

By the 1960s Woollaston was finally able to paint full-time and earn a living from his work assisted by a second Fellowship grant. In 1962 this second grant allowed a trip to Europe and the United States. In 1968 the Woollastons moved to Riwaka near Nelson and built a house. It was a location with ‘romantic associations’ as Woollaston had lived there briefly as an eighteen-year-old at a time when he was bent on becoming a poet. Philip Woollaston, the youngest of Woollaston's four children, kept up the family associations with the area. He was the (Labour) Member of Parliament for Nelson from 1981 to 1990 and currently manages the Toss Woollaston Trust. Edith Woollaston died in 1987 following a severe stroke, aged 83. After her death, Woollaston became a close friend of Anne Martindell who had been the United States Ambassador to New Zealand from 1979 to 1981. They spent time travelling in the United States together.

== Friendship with Colin McCahon ==
McCahon first saw Woollaston's work while he was at high school. In his essay Beginnings in Landfall McCahon recalls, ‘I met the artist himself some years later; I saw the actual Nelson landscape and better understood the discipline imposed by the painter on his subject...I still remember the revelations of that first exhibition’ It was the beginning of a long association and friendship but, as the two men were rarely in the same place at the same time, much of it was conducted by mail. In 1959 Woollaston took the unusual step of publicly supporting McCahon by reviewing his friend's work in the exhibition Eight New Zealand Painters III in The Star (Christchurch). Woollaston commented that, ‘The artist is indeed often lonely when his vision stands up in contrast to the horizontal will of the public...for things already assured by repetition...’ The same year McCahon dedicated the painting Toss in Greymouth to Woollaston. Woollaston publicly supported McCahon again the following year when the younger artist's work Painting won the Hay's Art Competition. The public outcry including The Press art critic's comment that it was, ‘... not a picture of anything,’ was strongly rebuffed by Woollaston's review in The Press. Much later, in 1980, McCahon referred directly to a connection with Woollaston in the title of a major black and white work A Painting for Uncle Frank named after Woollaston's deeply religious uncle.

== Painting style ==
Although committed and talented, after leaving art school Woollaston was still searching for an independent way to express himself. He found it in 1935 in the teachings of the German Cubist painter Hans Hoffman via the artist Flora Scales. Scales had kept notes from her lessons with Hoffman when she had been in Germany and Woollaston made a copy of them for his own study. Hoffman had analysed the work of Cézanne and the rotation of planes and foreshortening of foregrounds this revealed appealed to the young painter. Woollaston had deeply admired Cézanne since he had seen reproductions as a boy in The Children's Encyclopedia by Arthur Mee. In his autobiography he wrote, ‘the pictures are full of a new kind of space ... created in terms of the two dimensions of the picture-plane itself...’ The move to Greymouth brought a more expressionistic linear approach to his work. Art writers Hamish Keith and Gordon Brown described it as having, ‘a greater control, with the ability to use colour in a manner suggestive of luminosity.’ From the outset Woollaston painted alongside landscapes, figurative subjects which were largely of his immediate family and friends. Art historian Tony Green described his early work as, ‘the nearest to a radical rejection of older representational norms...with their appeal to the authority of a universal natural feeling, instead of an appeal to techniques of accurate transcription of the visible. A good example of this is Figures from Life (1936) a double portrait of Woollaston's wife Edith and his close friend Rodney Kennedy. Peter Tomory, when director of the Auckland City Art Gallery, called it ‘the first modern portrait in New Zealand.’ Woollaston's interest in portraits continued throughout his painting career and, as noted by curator and writer Jill Trevelyan, after seeing major works by Goya in the Museo del Prado in Madrid in 1963, he introduced more complexity into his paintings. This can clearly be seen in The Buchan Family (1963–64). where Trevelyan notes, ‘the composition establishes a push-pull effect of great energy and dynamism.’ In 1971 Woollaston made another breakthrough, this time with the assistance of his Wellington dealer Peter McLeavey, who suggested working on a larger scale using full sheets of 9 x 4 foot (274 x 121cms) hardboard. Woollaston wrote to Charles Brasch, ‘The size has a curious effect on my feelings about other work. I feel stimulated.’

== Selected solo exhibitions ==
1936 M.T. Woollaston His first solo exhibition in Dunedin organised by Rodney Kennedy.

1948 M. T. Woollaston Wellington Public Library. Organised by Ron O’Reilly.

1954 M. T. Wollaston Wellington Architectural Centre Gallery.

1959 M. T. Wollaston Gallery 91, Christchurch. The gallery was run by Barbara Brooke who later established the Brooke Gifford Gallery with Judith Gifford.

1962 M. T. Woollaston Durham Street Art Gallery, Christchurch.

1968 M. T. Woollaston: Paintings, Drawings and Watercolours Peter McLeavey Gallery, Wellington. This was Woollaston's first exhibition at Peter McLeavey's gallery. He would have 18 more exhibitions during his life-time with the Wellington dealer.

1969 Dunedin Public Art Gallery.

1973 MT Woollaston Works / 1933-1973 Manawatu Art Gallery, Palmerston North.

1977 M.T. Woollaston Life Drawings Suter Art Gallery, Nelson (toured).

1979 Woollaston in Wellington Dowse Art Gallery, Lower Hutt

1979 Woollaston Drawings and Watercolours Suter Art Gallery, Nelson.

1992 Toss Woollaston: a Retrospective Museum of New Zealand Te Papa Tongarewa. (toured)

== Selected group exhibitions ==
1936 The Group Woollaston showed six works including Figures from Life.

1949 McCahon / Woollaston Helen Hitchings Gallery, Wellington. Hitchings later said of the exhibition, ‘The impact of these two painters was tremendous—and particularly together! Nothing like it had been seen!’

1952 15 New Zealand Painters Irving Galleries, London.

1959 Eight New Zealand Painters (toured). The critic JNK said of Woollaston's work, ‘There is quiet spiritual strength in these big, spacious, ruggedly painted compositions.’

1961 Painting from the Pacific, Auckland City Art Gallery

1963 MT Woollaston – Colin McCahon: a Retrospective Exhibition Auckland City Art Gallery.

1964 New Zealand Contemporary Painting and Ceramics Takashimaya Department Store, Tokyo, Japan. Organised by the Queen Elizabeth II Arts Council (tours Japan, Malaysia and India) Shown during the Tokyo Olympics. Along with Woollaston the exhibition included paintings by Colin McCahon, Don Peebles and ceramics by Len Castle and Barry Brickell, among others. ‘To help counter the impression we are a nation of shepherds’.

1965 Contemporary Painting in New Zealand Commonwealth Institute, London.

1970-71 Contemporary Painting in New Zealand: Twelve Artists. Smithsonian Institution, Washington.

1971 111 Views of Mount Egmont Govett-Brewster Art Gallery, New Plymouth.

1977 Woollaston: a Taranaki Excursion Govett-Brewster Art Gallery, New Plymouth. To celebrate New Plymouth's Centennial the Govett-Brewster Art Gallery invited Woollaston to spend a month in the city making paintings to be exhibited in the gallery.

1981 New Zealand Painting 1940-1960: Conformity and Discussion (toured).

1986 Content/Context: a Survey of Recent New Zealand Art National Art Gallery, Wellington.

== Controversy ==
In 1977 the Director of the Govett-Brewster Art Gallery in New Plymouth, Ron O’Reilly, proposed Woollaston's Moturoa to the New Plymouth City Council as a purchase for the collection. The Mayor D. V. Sutherland responded by claiming the artist would be, ‘laughing all the way to the bank.’ It was one of many attacks by the Council on purchases during O’Reilly's tenure. In his spirited defence O’Reilly told the Council, ‘Our policy is to buy contemporary work and Woollaston is one of the leading contemporary painters. I don't want to argue about it.’ As with a number of other contentious purchases, O’Reilly got his way.

== Published writing ==
Throughout his career Woollaston was a frequently published writer of art criticism and commentary.

=== Articles and letters ===
An early venue for publication was Tomorrow, New Zealand's first left-wing magazine edited by Kennaway Henderson. It started publication in 1934. In the April 1936 issue Woollaston contributed, in what would become his typical frank and provocative style, Life, Art and the Bourgeois Manifesto. 'The antidote to an easy, wistful idealism about life and art is a thorough realisation of the implacable enmity which exists between an artist who retains the intensity of his calling, and the bourgeoisie. . .’ wrote Woollaston. He also wrote for the journal Art in New Zealand and was a regular letter writer to both publications and to local newspapers. Poetry was also a lifelong passion.

In the sixties, when Woollaston travelled overseas, he submitted a regular series of observational commentaries on the art he had seen and how it affected him. His series An Artist Abroad was featured in The Press from 1962 to 1963. A typical column describes his walk to the Prado in Madrid where he spends time with Goya's Execution on the third of May. He told his readers that he found ‘Goya, while abating nothing of their fate, had bathed them in compassion.’

=== Books ===
1962 The Far-away Hills: a Meditation on New Zealand Landscape. Originally presented as an autobiographical lecture to the Auckland Gallery Associates and published by the Auckland City Art Gallery.

1966 Erua. Woollaston began a series of studies of Māori schoolboy Rodney Gutteridge, in preparation for a painting in 1961. A selection of these studies accompanied by Woollaston's observations was published by Blackwood & Janet Paul Ltd.

1980 Sage Tea: an Autobiography. Woollaston sets the tone with the first line of this autobiography, ‘My Mother wished I had been a daughter.’ The book tells Woollaston's story from birth to 1936. The book was published by William Collins Publishing (Auckland).

== Collections ==
Woollaston has works in the following public collections:

Arts House Trust, Auckland. The collection includes 81 of Woollaston's Erua studies.

Auckland Art Gallery Toi o Tāmaki.

Christchurch Art Gallery Te Puna o Waiwhetu.

Dowse Art Museum, Lower Hutt

Dunedin Public Art Gallery.

Govett-Brewster Art Gallery, New Plymouth.

National Gallery of Victoria, Melbourne.

Te Manawa, Palmerston North.

== Awards ==
1958 Association of New Zealand Art Societies Fellowship Award.

1960 Association of New Zealand Art Societies Fellowship Award.

1961 Travel grant from Arts Advisory Council.

Woollaston was appointed a Knight Bachelor in the 1979 Queen's Birthday Honours, becoming the first New Zealander to be knighted for services to art (Peter Siddell being the second).

== Death ==
Woollaston died in Upper Moutere on 30 August 1998 at the age of 88.
