= William Leary =

William Leary may refer to:

- William H. Leary (1881–1957), dean of the University of Utah College of Law
- William J. Leary (1931–2018), American school administrator and academic
- William M. Leary (1934–2006), American academic and aviation historian

== See also ==
- William O'Leary (disambiguation)
