= Caxton Press (New Zealand) =

Publisher in New Zealand (1932–)

- Founded: 1932
- Founder: Denis Glover
- Country of origin: New Zealand
- Publication types: Commercial printing, previously literary fiction and poetry
- Official website: Official website

Caxton Press is a printing company founded in 1935 in a partnership between Denis Glover and John Drew. The press printed the work of many New Zealand writers who have since become familiar names in New Zealand literature, and from 1947 to 1992 was the printer of Landfall, New Zealand's longest-running literary journal. As of 2023 the press is focussed on commercial printing.

== History ==
=== 1932–1936 ===
In 1932 Denis Glover and a group of fellow University of Canterbury students created the Caxton Club. It was partly inspired by a desire at the height of the depression to help create an identity for the political left. The club acquired a hand-run printing press and produced the short-lived magazines Oriflamme (banned by the university for its radical content) and Sirocco. The club also published an anthology of poems titled New Poems in July 1934, which included works by Glover, Charles Brasch, Allen Curnow, A. R. D. Fairburn and R. A. K. Mason.

After graduating from university, in 1935 Glover and partner John Drew established the Caxton Club Press as a commercial printer and publisher. They acquired a larger machine-run printing press and established themselves in unused stables in Christchurch's central city. They published poems and pamphlets by Curnow, Glover and Fairburn, and also took on commercial printing jobs. In 1936 the name was shortened to the Caxton Press, and they published works by Mason, Glover, Curnow, Ursula Bethell and D'Arcy Cresswell, as well as a collection of poems from Tomorrow magazine.

=== 1936–1950 ===
In 1937 they acquired more professional premises and a better printer, and Leo Bensemann joined as a partner in the business. His work Fantastica: Thirteen Drawings was published in 1937 and was their most expensive and complex publication so far. They also began to print longer prose works such as works by Frank Sargeson and M. H. Holcroft.

During the World War II, Glover served in the navy but publications continued, including Beyond the Palisade, the first book by James K. Baxter (1944) who was then eighteen. After Glover's return, Caxton's publications continued including notably two anthologies in 1945: A Book of New Zealand Verse 1923–45 (edited by Curnow) and Speaking for Ourselves (a collection of short stories edited by Sargeson).

From 1947 to 1992 the press printed Landfall, New Zealand's longest-running literary magazine, which was subsequently taken over by Otago University Press.

=== 1950 onwards ===
In 1951 the press moved again to a new building in Victoria Street, Christchurch, and Glover was dismissed from the press due to problems caused by his alcoholism. Thereafter the press published more commercial and less literary work, although did continue publishing works by Brasch, Sargeson, Ruth Dallas and others. In 1962 the anthology Landfall Country: Work from Landfall 1947–1961 was published, which was the longest work ever published by Caxton.

In 1978 the press was sold to Bascands, another Christchurch-based printing company. During the 1980s it published the Caxton Press New Poets series, edited by Michael Harlow. An anthology of New Zealand poetry, edited by Mark Williams, was published in 1987 to mark fifty years since the founding of the press.

In March 2015, the press moved out of the central city of Christchurch and into the suburb of Wigram, following damage to their central city premises in the 2011 Christchurch earthquake.

== Notable poets and authors ==
Notable poets and authors published by Caxton press have included:

- James K. Baxter
- Ursula Bethell
- Charles Brasch
- Allen Curnow
- D'Arcy Cresswell
- Ruth Dallas
- Basil Dowling
- A. R. D. Fairburn
- Janet Frame
- Denis Glover
- M. H. Holcroft
- R. A. K. Mason
- Frank Sargeson
