= Drysdale Overture =

The Drysdale Overture, composed in, 1937 is among the earliest works for orchestra by New Zealand composer Douglas Lilburn.

The piece was written while Lilburn was a student at the Royal College of Music and was based on a challenge from his professor, Ralph Vaughan Williams. Reportedly, Vaughan Williams had begun his teaching by asking Lilburn to write fugues and part-songs; one day, though, he asked, "Isn't it time you composed something?" Lilburn responded by producing the overture.

Lilburn later reported that his score greatly upset Sir George Dyson, to whom he brought it for a piano reduction. Dyson found it to be a mess; he did, however, arrange a read-through with the College orchestra.

The overture is dedicated to Robert Lilburn, the composer's father. It is meant to celebrate the family farm and estate where Lilburn was born. In writing it, the composer later wrote that he was "left with that lovely Mark Twain image of Jim and Huckleberry drifting on their barge down that great river, looking up at the stars and wondering 'whether they was made, or only just happened'"

The Drysdale Overture has been recorded twice by the New Zealand Symphony Orchestra: first under Sir William Southgate and then under Kenneth Young. The Drysdale Overture was first published in 2014 by Promethean Editions; this edition was edited by Robert Hoskins and Roderick Biss.

== See also ==
- Continuum Records, Douglas Lilburn: Orchestral Music. New Zealand SO, William Southgate
- Performed by the Auckland Philharmonia, conducted by Enrique Diemecke, available at Radio New Zealand
