= Caselberg Trust =

Trust offering artist residencies and poetry prize in New Zealand

The Caselberg Trust is a charitable trust in New Zealand, named in honour of Anna and John Caselberg. It was established in 2006 to purchase the Caselberg's house in Broad Bay on the Otago Peninsula in the South Island of New Zealand. The house is next door to one once owned by Charles Brasch which he bequeathed to the Caselberg's and is now in private ownership. The Trust renovated the Caselberg's house and opened it to the public in 2008. The house also includes studio space, named the Charles Brasch Studio. The trust offers creative residences and runs the Caselberg International Poetry Prize.

The trust offers a number of residencies, including some in conjunction with partners:

- The Caselberg Trust Margaret Egan Cities of Literature Writers Residency, established in 2023, is aimed at providing "international and Aotearoa New Zealand writers an opportunity to work on a substantial piece of creative writing and to foster connections among creative writers in Aotearoa New Zealand and internationally".
- The Elizabeth Brooke-Carr Emerging Writers Residency is a week-long residency, obtained through a recommendation from an established writer, and alternates between poetry, fiction, non-fiction, and journalism.
- The CISS Scottish Writers Fellowship and CISS Irish Writers Fellowship take place in alternate years and are run in partnership with the University of Otago Centre for Irish and Scottish Studies.
- A summer residency for artists is run with the Blue Oyster Art Project Space.

== Past residents ==
Past residents include:

- Sihle Ntuli, poet, 2025 Margaret Egan Cities of Literature Writers Resident
- Jess Nicholson, ceramicist, 2025 Creative Connections Resident
- Alison Glenny, 2024 Margaret Egan Cities of Literature Writers Resident
- Kate Aschoff, 2024 Elizabeth Brooke-Carr Emerging Writer Resident
- Alison Isadora, 2023 Creative Connections Resident
- Sarah Hudson, 2022 Creative Connections Resident
- Lucy Marinkovich, 2021 Creative Connections Resident
- Megan Kitching, 2021 Elizabeth Brooke-Carr Emerging Writer Resident
- Turumeke Harrington, 2021 Blue Oyster Art Project Space Resident
- Catherine Macdonald, 2020 IN-PRINT Resident
- Bridget Reweti, 2019 Creative Connections Resident
- photographer Justin Spiers, 2018 Creative Connections Resident
- Victoria McIntosh, 2017 Creative Connections Resident
- Becky Cameron, 2016 Creative Connections Resident
- Alex Taylor, 2015 Creative Connections Resident
- Stanley Palmer, 2014 IN-PRINT Resident
- Pacific Underground, 2013 Creative Connections Residents
- Catherine Day, 2012 Down the Bay Resident
- Megan Jane Campbell, 2012 Creative Connections Resident
- Lynn Taylor, 2012 Down the Bay Resident
- poet Anna Smith, 2011 Writer in Residence
- Michael Harlow, inaugural resident

== Caselberg International Poetry Prize ==
The prize is awarded annually for a previously unpublished poem of up to 40 lines in length. The first prize is $500 and a week residency of the Caselberg house. Past winners include:

- 2023: joint winners Jilly O'Brien and Tim Saunders; runner-up Megan Kitching
- 2020: winner Tim Upperton; runner-up Giles Graham
- 2017: winner Majella Cullinane; runner-up Ruth Arnison
- 2015: winner Dunedin poet Sue Wootton; runner-up Jessica le Bas
- 2011: winner Mary McCallum; runner-up Michelle Amas
