= A Song of Islands =

Tone poem

- by Douglas Lilburn
- Form: Tone poem
- Composed: Christchurch, 1946
- Scoring: Orchestra

A Song of Islands is a tone poem (described by the composer as a song) written for orchestra by New Zealand composer Douglas Lilburn in 1946. The work is the last in a trilogy of pieces exploring the theme of New Zealand identity; it was preceded by the overture Aotearoa (1940) and Landfall in Unknown Seas (1942) for narrator and string orchestra.

== History and music ==
Lilburn described the piece as featuring "a chorale-like theme" that develops into an "arch-like form".

The piece has been recorded by the New Zealand Symphony Orchestra under Sir William Southgate. A Naxos recording by James Judd with the NZSO was issued in August 2006; it also includes Lilburn's Aotearoa Overture, Forest, A Birthday Offering, Drysdale Overture, Festival Overture and Processional Fanfare.
