= Lucy Marinkovich =

New Zealand dancer and choreographer

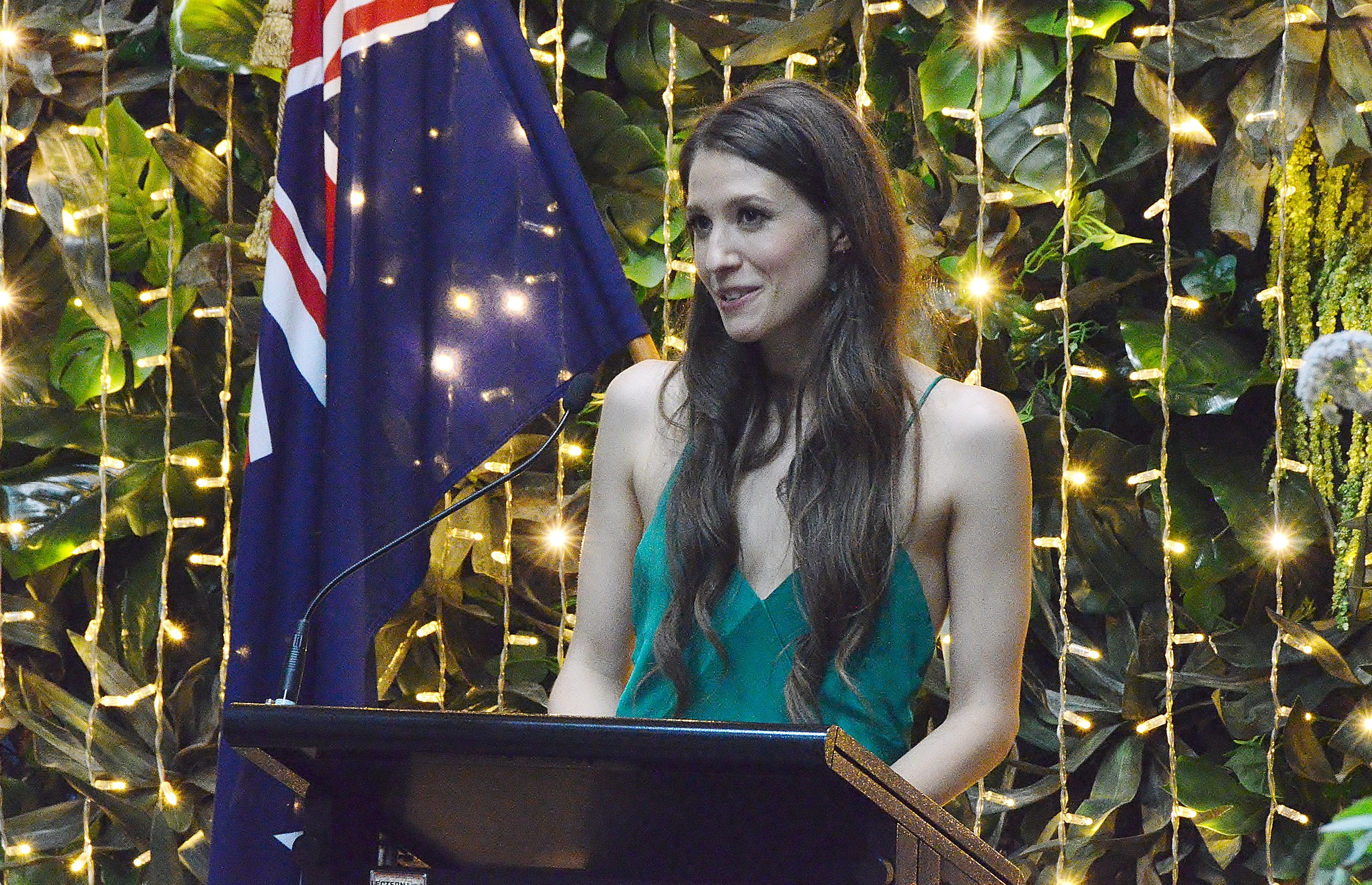
- Marinkovich in 2018
- Born: Wellington, New Zealand
- Occupation(s): Dancer and choreographer
- Years active: 2005–present
- Partner: Lucien Johnson

Lucy Marinkovich is a New Zealand dancer and choreographer. She is the artistic director and choreographer of Wellington-based performing arts group Borderline Arts Ensemble.

== Biography ==
Marinkovich was born in Wellington and began dance lessons at the age of five with Deirdre Tarrant. Marinkovich studied contemporary dance at the New Zealand School of Dance, graduating in 2009. While a student, she studied short courses at P.A.R.T.S in Belgium, Batsheva Dance Company in Israel and worked as a research assistant for Rosemary Martin in Ramallah, Palestine. She also concurrently studied for a bachelor's degree in English literature by distance with Massey University.

Marinkovich started dancing and modelling with the World of Wearable Art competitions in 2005 and performed with the organisation for ten years, including in their performance at the Hong Kong Arts Festival in 2012. In 2010, Marinkovich joined Footnote Dance and danced with the company nationally and internationally for several years. In 2011 she was described by The Press as "set to be the star" of the company's Made in New Zealand 2011 programme, appearing in all four of the programmed works.

In 2014, Marinkovich received the Creative New Zealand Tup Lang Choreographic Award. She choreographed productions at INSTINC Art Gallery Singapore and Rimbun Dahan in Kuala Lumpur, Malaysia. In 2017, she devised and choreographed a surrealist dance/drama performance called Lobsters, staged at the Circa Theatre. A review in The Dominion Post called it an "incredibly innovative and original piece of performance art", and the show won three Wellington Theatre Awards. In 2018, Marinkovich was appointed dance educator for the Royal New Zealand Ballet, delivering the company's education and community events. She has also worked for the New Zealand School of Dance as a choreographer.

In 2018 she was awarded the Harriet Friedlander New York Residency from the Arts Foundation of New Zealand jointly with her partner, musician Lucien Johnson. This residency of $100,000 enabled them to spend a year living in New York City. In March 2020, the Borderline Arts Ensemble premiered Strasbourg 1518 at the New Zealand International Arts Festival, directed and choreographed by Marinkovich and inspired by the dancing plague of 1518; the show's initial run was cut short due to the COVID-19 pandemic. It was performed again as part of the 2021 Auckland Arts Festival.

In 2021, Marinkovich held a Caroline Plummer Community Dance Fellowship in Dunedin; as part of this fellowship she developed and ran a programme teaching people living with Parkinson's disease to dance. She also held the Caselberg Trust Creative Connections residency.
