= John Caselberg =

New Zealand writer (1927–2004)

Fitzclarence Anstey John Caselberg (19 August 1927 – 16 April 2004) was a New Zealand writer.

Caselberg was born at Wakefield, south of Nelson, in 1927 and educated at Nelson College from 1936 to 1944.

His work ranged through poetry and playwriting to short stories and essays. Along with his wife, artist Anna Caselberg, he was at the centre of a thriving art and literary milieu which included his good friend and collaborator Colin McCahon, father-in-law Toss Woollaston, and writer Charles Brasch. Caselberg was awarded the Robert Burns Fellowship from the University of Otago in 1961.

He died in Dunedin in 2004.

The Caselberg Trust, a charitable trust supporting artists, is named in honour of John and Anna Caselberg. The Trust awards an amount of money each year to an aspiring artist or writer.

== Publications ==
- Chart to My Country, John Caselberg. European travel notes, art criticism and stories of "Cultural Contact". John McIndoe Ltd, Dunedin, 1973.
