= Symphony No. 1 (Lilburn) =

1949/51 symphony by New Zealand composer Douglas Lilburn

The Symphony No. 1 of Douglas Lilburn was completed in 1949, and had its premiere in 1951. The symphony is in three integrated movements; a typical performance lasts around 30 minutes.

The symphony opens with a trumpet motto, forcefully stated, and shadowed by timpani; this is eventually woven into a theme for strings, over which woodwinds begin a climb. The second theme of the movement is more austere, yet is still exuberant. The second movement is more lyrical in nature, and is structured around two main themes; of these, the first is stated initially by the strings, while the second is first taken up by the woodwinds. The third and final movement is built on four themes, derived from what Lilburn once called "the naive, generous country that gave one its joyous force".

The movements are marked as follows:

1. Allegro non troppo
2. Andante con moto
3. Allegro

The orchestration of the symphony consists of 2 flutes, 2 oboes, 2 clarinets, 2 bassoons, 4 horns, 3 trumpets, 3 trombones, timpani, and strings.

Several recordings of the symphony exist. The symphony was given its first engraved publication in 2015.
