= Aotearoa (overture) =

Concert overture for orchestra

- by Douglas Lilburn
- Genre: Classical music
- Form: Concert overture
- Composed: London, 1940
- Scoring: Orchestra

Aotearoa is a concert overture written for orchestra by New Zealand composer Douglas Lilburn in 1940. The overture is the first of three early works by Lilburn which centre on the theme of national identity; the other two are Landfall in Unknown Seas (1942), for narrator and orchestra, and the tone poem A Song of Islands (1946).

== History and music ==
The title of the overture (Aotearoa) is taken from the Māori name for New Zealand.

Lilburn wrote the overture while he was still a student at London's Royal College of Music, and it was premiered at a concert held to commemorate the signing of the Treaty of Waitangi at His Majesty's Theatre in London. It was not performed in New Zealand until 1959, but it has since entered the country's standard orchestral repertory.

Typical of Lilburn's early work, the overture features idiomatic writing for winds, especially flutes, and vigorous dynamic contrasts.

Composer Jack Body has said that the work "is the most frequently performed orchestral work by a New Zealand composer, and is likely to remain so". Many commercial recordings have been made of the work; for example, Symphony of Sails performed by Auckland Philharmonia Orchestra, conducted by Miguel Harth-Bedoya in 2002.

In 2011, the manuscript score was entered into the UNESCO Memory of the World Aotearoa New Zealand Ngā Mahara o te Ao register. It was the first item from the National Library of New Zealand to be added to the collection.

== Instrumentation ==
Woodwinds: 2 Flutes 2 Oboes 2 Clarinet 2 Bassoons Brass: 4 Horns 2 Trumpets 3 Trombones Percussions: Timpani Triangle Cymbals Strings: 2 Violins Violas Cello Double Bass
