= Landfall in Unknown Seas =

Classical composition for narrator and string orchestra

- by Douglas Lilburn
- Genre: Classical music
- Commissioned by: John Beaglehole
- Text: Poem by Allen Curnow
- Language: English
- Composed: Wellington, 1942
- Scoring: String orchestra

Landfall in Unknown Seas is a work for narrator and string orchestra written by New Zealand composer Douglas Lilburn and poet Allen Curnow in 1942. It was the second in Lilburn's early trilogy of works dealing with the theme of New Zealand identity, following the overture Aotearoa and preceding A Song of Islands.

== History and music ==
The text of the work is taken from a poem by Curnow, and tells the story of New Zealand's discovery by Abel Tasman. It was originally commissioned by John Beaglehole on behalf of the New Zealand government to mark 300 years since Tasman's visit to New Zealand in 1642.

The work has three movements, with each movement followed by a reading of one of the three parts of the poem.

The first performance, with Curnow reading the poem, was premiered by radio on 13 December 1942, the day of Tasman's arrival in New Zealand. Since then, the work has been widely performed and recorded, and the poem has become one of the best-known of all New Zealand poems. In 1993 a recording was made of a performance by the New Zealand Chamber Orchestra with narration by Sir Edmund Hillary.

The well-known New Zealand literary journal Landfall was named after this work.
