= Symphony No. 3 (Lilburn) =

The Symphony No. 3 of Douglas Lilburn was completed in 1961, in response to a sabbatical from Victoria University of Wellington. It was given its premiere the following year, and published by Faber Music (and co-published by Schirmer) around 1968.

The symphony was described by Lilburn as "a harsh, didactic personalised piece of searching rhetoric", and, indeed, of all his compositions, this is the one with the greatest twelve-tone influence. It is a one-movement work in five sections, marked Moderato – Vivace – Allegro – Andante – Allegro, and is shorter than his other symphonies, typically lasting some fifteen minutes in performance.

Unlike with his other symphonies, Lilburn provided a synopsis for this work:

The first [episode], introductory, develops an idea heard from a solo bassoon. The second is an Allegro set going by solo trumpet. This reverts to the mood of the introduction until the side drum decides on another Allegro. The fourth section is a slower one, again launched by trumpet and concerned with some dialogue for brass. This also returns briefly to the introduction, and the final section is in the nature of a fragmented coda.

The opening statement of the symphony contains a three-note rising figure which directly recalls Sings Harry, Lilburn's song cycle to words of Denis Glover, and some critics have identified Harry, and Lilburn's identification with the character, as the true subject of the symphony.

The Third Symphony was among Lilburn's last purely acoustic compositions; soon after its completion he turned his attention to electronic music, in which field he spent the remainder of his career.

Several recordings of the symphony exist.
