= Symphony No. 2 (Lilburn) =

The Symphony No. 2 of Douglas Lilburn was completed in 1951, and received its premiere in 1959. It appears to have been revised in 1974. The work is divided into four movements:

1. Prelude: Moderato (half note = betw. 52–56)
2. Scherzo: Allegro vivace (quarter note = approx. 152)
3. Introduction: Poco lento (quarter note = approx. 69) – without pause –
4. Finale: Allegro (half note = betw. 116–120)

A typical performance of the piece lasts around 30 minutes, and several recordings exist. The work was published in 1979 by Price Milburn of Wellington though it seems to have circulated in manuscript copies earlier.
