= Landfall (journal) =

New Zealand literary magazine

- Cover of first issue, March 1947
- Editor: Lynley Edmeades
- Former editors: List of former editors: Charles Brasch Robin Dudding Leo Bensemann Peter Smart David Dowling Chris Price Justin Paton David Eggleton Emma Neale
- Frequency: Biannual
- Publisher: Otago University Press
- Founder: Charles Brasch
- Founded: 1947
- Country: New Zealand
- Based in: Dunedin
- Language: English
- Website: otago.ac.nz/press/landfall/

Landfall Tauraka (formerly Landfall) is New Zealand's oldest extant literary magazine. It is published biannually by Otago University Press. As of 2025, each issue is a paperback volume of about 200 pages. The journal features new fiction and poetry, biographical and critical essays, cultural commentary, and book reviews. Its companion website, The Landfall Tauraka Review, publishes monthly long-form literary reviews.

Landfall was founded and first edited by New Zealand poet Charles Brasch. It was described by Peter Simpson in the Oxford Companion to New Zealand Literature (2006) as "the most important and long-lasting journal in New Zealand's literature". Historian Michael King said that during the twentieth century, "Landfall would more than any other single organ promote New Zealand voices in literature and, at least for the duration of Brasch's editorship (1947–66), publish essays, fiction and poetry of the highest standard".

== Background ==
Denis Glover, of Caxton Press, visited Brasch in London while on leave from naval service during World War II, and it was then the two "discussed the idea for a new, professionally produced literary journal in New Zealand". Other periodicals in existence at that time were smaller and irregularly published, such as Book, edited by Anton Vogt, and also published by Caxton Press. Brasch had held the ambition of publishing "a substantial literary journal" in New Zealand for at least 15 years.

The title Landfall was likely to have been inspired by Landfall in Unknown Seas, a poem written by Allen Curnow in 1942 and set to music by his friend Douglas Lilburn in 1944. The poem records the arrival of the first Europeans in New Zealand. It is one of the best-known of all New Zealand poems. Tom Weston noted in 1985 that in its early years, "Landfall in Unknown Seas" was "something of a motto": "There was a sense of discovery, of sorting out a place [for New Zealand literature] in this world."

== History ==
=== Brasch as editor: 1947–1966 ===
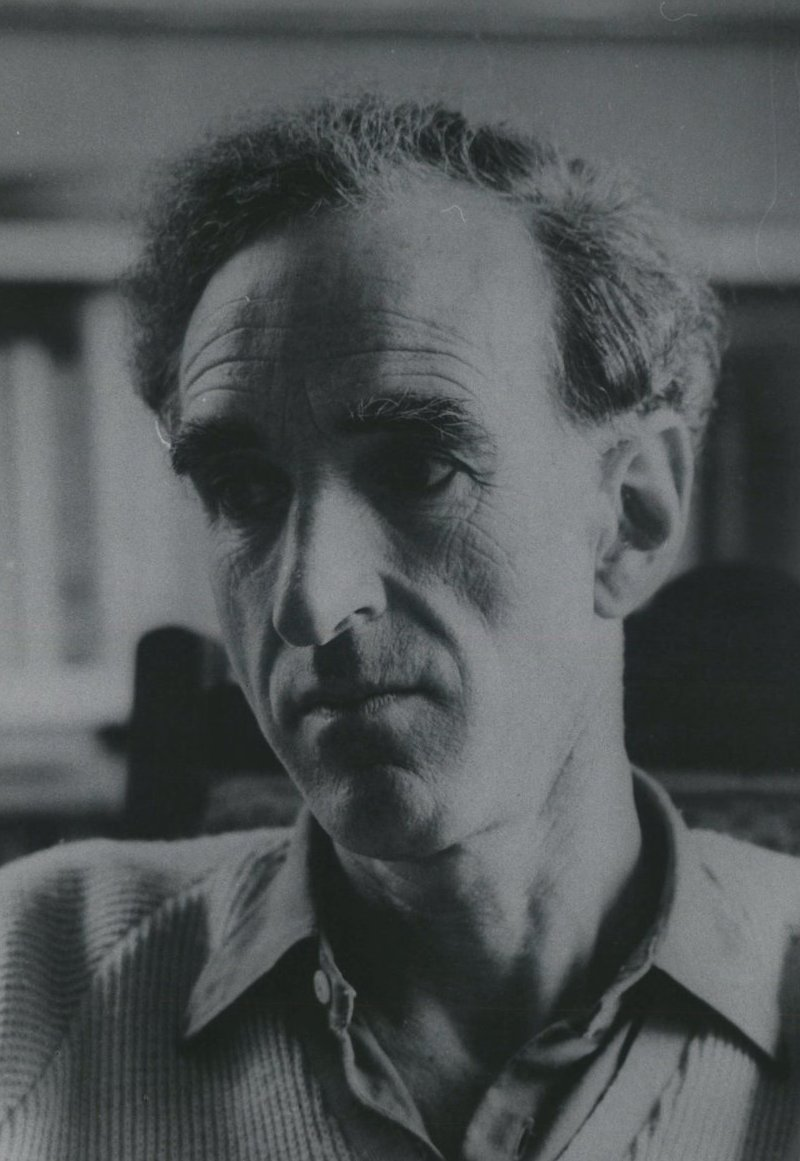
Charles Brasch, founder and editor from 1947 to 1966

The magazine was established in 1947 and published by Caxton Press, with Brasch as the editor-in-chief for the first two decades. Glover and Leo Bensemann acted as designers, typographers and printers. For its first 46 years (174 issues), Landfall was a quarterly of 76 pages (with some variation) with a brown paper cover, printed in two colours (and four colours from 1979 onwards). 800 copies of the first issue were printed, and Brasch later said they sold out "almost at once". An early review by Oliver Duff in the New Zealand Listener was positive but predicted that the magazine would last no more than a year.

Landfall was New Zealand's leading literary journal during Brasch's editorship, and significantly important to New Zealand's emerging literary culture in the 1950s and 1960s. The journal also had pages dedicated to coverage of the arts in general and public affairs. Brasch devoted himself to editing the journal on a full-time basis, and applied high and exacting standards to the work published. At times, Brasch's high standards led to friction, with some young writers resenting what they saw as his inflexibility and solemnity, and calling the journal elitist. He did, however, encourage and promote the work of new writers in whom he saw promise.

Brasch ensured that the journal not only published poems, short stories and reviews, but also published paintings, photographs and other visual art, and provided commentary on the arts, theatre, music, architecture, and aspects of public affairs. His vision for the journal was that it would be "distinctly of New Zealand without being parochial", and he viewed the likely audience as the educated public: "Everyone for whom literature and the arts are a necessity of life." Virtually all prominent writers in New Zealand at that time were published in Landfall; Janet Frame wrote in her autobiography An Angel At My Table that her early impression of the magazine was that "if you didn't appear in Landfall then you could scarcely call yourself a writer".

At the peak of the magazine's popularity, in the early 1960s, around 1600 copies were being printed of each issue. Brasch recalled that the peak sales figure was 2000 copies for an issue published in his last year of editing the paper, despite almost no advertising. In 1962, Brasch published Landfall Country: Work from Landfall, 1947–61, an anthology of works published in Landfall. Writers and poets featured included Maurice Gee, Frank Sargeson, C.K. Stead, Ruth Dallas, Curnow, James K. Baxter and Fleur Adcock, and there were reproductions of paintings, sculptures and photographs by various New Zealand artists including Colin McCahon, Evelyn Page and others. It also included twenty-nine pages of selections from the editorial section written by Brasch himself.

In 2013, the Charles Brasch literary and personal papers archive at the Hocken Collections were included as an entry on the UNESCO Memory of the World Register. The archive includes significant amounts of material relating to Landfall and the authors who were published within the journal.

=== After Brasch: 1966–1995 ===
==== Dudding (1966–1971) ====
Brasch left the magazine in 1966 and chose the young editor of magazine Mate, Robin Dudding, to succeed him. Dudding's noteworthy achievements were to commission artists to illustrate short stories, and to publish issue number 100, which included a lengthy interview with Brasch. In 1971, however, Dudding was dismissed by Caxton Press, reportedly for failing to deliver an issue on time. He set up a competing journal called Islands, and some of Landfall's key contributors such as Brasch, Curnow and Stead switched their allegiance to this new journal; Landfall did not recover its status as the leading literary journal of New Zealand until the editorship of David Dowling in the early 1980s.

==== Bensemann (1971–1975) ====
Bensemann, who had been involved on the production side since 1947, took over as editor for the fourteen issues from 1971 to 1975. Although he struggled to keep literary standards high due to the loss of key writers to Islands, he improved visual standards; the number of illustration pages increased from four pages to eight and featured a number of notable New Zealand artists such as Don Peebles and Pat Hanly.

==== Smart (1975–1981) ====
Bensemann's successor, Peter Smart, was an English teacher who was keen to encourage beginner writers and to publish work that deserved encouragement, with mixed results. Issue 129, released in March 1979, was themed around stories and myths about death, which Smart described in his editorial as "that final stage of growth". Reviewer Diana Prout for The Press noted that although the issue featured some poems about Māori people and reviews of Māori writers' work, it featured no Māori writers.

Smart died in December 1981. A review by Dick Corballis of his last Landfall issue, number 140, suggested that Smart was under-appreciated and that his "editorial experiments" (such as themed issues, discouraging academic reviews and including overseas authors) "ensured that Landfall was always fresh and unpredictable".

==== Dowling (1982–1986) ====
When Dowling succeeded Smart in 1982, he was said by Peter Simpson to have raised standards once again and recovered the magazine's literary reputation. Tom Weston, however, in 1985 recorded his view that the magazine was not especially innovative although it "still publishes some important work". On another occasion Weston noted that the magazine, then nearing four decades of publication, had "faded into the doldrums of (near) middle age". He attributed this to New Zealand's small literary audience and the need to attract as wide a readership as possible.

Commenting on the magazine's development in The Press in 1986, Weston revisited his earlier reviews and felt that Landfall had transformed since 1984 into something more "vibrant, attentive and engaging". He attributed this in part to the competition of other literary magazines such as Islands and AND.

==== Rotating editors (1986–1993) ====
In issue 160, published in December 1986, the magazine announced that its editorial structure would be moving to an editorial board of five editors with equal status, each responsible for a different section of the magazine. The issue's editorial explained that Landfall had to address different expectations of its readers and fast-pace developments. It was also hoped that the magazine would become more "outward looking" and include more works from the Pacific, Australia and other cultures having relevance to New Zealand.

Tim Upperton, in his 1987 review of issue 161 for The Press, observed that for New Zealand authors, publication in Landfall "is, literarily speaking, to have arrived". He praised a number of the contributions, and noted that Landfall was a good place to "find out what is being done in New Zealand literature right now".

Oxford University Press era (1993–1994)

In 1993 the Caxton Press ceased publishing Landfall with issue 184, and Oxford University Press assumed responsibility from issue 185 (April 1993). From that point the journal’s publication frequency was reduced from quarterly to biannual. Chris Price became sole editor beginning with issue 186 (November 1993). Oxford University Press continued to publish the journal until issue 188 (November 1994).

=== Otago University Press: 1995–present ===
Otago University Press took over publication of the journal from issue 189 (May 1995). In 1999, the journal was awarded Best Review Pages at the Montana New Zealand Book Awards. In March 2011, the website Landfall Review Online was launched to supplement the print journal. It was renamed The Landfall Tauraka Review in 2025 to align with the journal’s rebrand.

In 1997, to mark the journal’s 50th anniversary, the Landfall Essay Competition was established. In 2009 it became an annual event, judged each year by the current editor. In 2017, the journal launched the Charles Brasch Young Writers’ Essay Competition, open to writers aged 16 to 25. Both competitions were renamed in 2025 as the Landfall Tauraka Essay Prize and the Landfall Tauraka Young Writers’ Essay Prize, coinciding with the journal’s landmark 250th issue and its new bilingual name.

==== Renamed Landfall Tauraka (2025) ====
In October 2025, with its 250th issue, Landfall was renamed Landfall Tauraka. The bilingual title, with tauraka meaning “landfall, anchorage, resting place” in Te reo Māori, reflects the journal’s founding principles and its continuing role as a harbour for Aotearoa’s diverse creative and critical voices.

==== Extending the conversation ====
Landfall Tauraka also supports a range of related initiatives. The Landfall Tauraka Review, edited by David Eggleton, publishes monthly long-form book reviews online. The Landfall Tauraka Short Story Series, edited by Chris Prentice and published by Otago University Press, releases one fiction collection each year, alternating between established and emerging writers. The biennial Strong Words anthologies, published by Otago University Press, gather essays from the two most recent essay competitions.

== Editors ==
- Charles Brasch (1947–1966, issues 1 to 80)
- Robin Dudding (1966–1972, issues 81 to 101)
- Leo Bensemann (1971–1975, issues 102 to 115)
- Peter Smart (1975–1981, issues 116 to 140)
- David Dowling (1982–1986, issues 140 to 159)
- Edited by a board with rotating members (1986–1992, issues 160 to 174)
- Chris Price (1993–2000, issue 175 to 200)
- Justin Paton (2000–2005, issues 200 to 209)
- Guest editors (2005–2010, issues 210 to 217)
- David Eggleton (2010–2017, issues 218 to 234)
- Emma Neale (2017–2021, issues 235 to 241)
- Lynley Edmeades (2021–present, issue 242 onwards)

== See also ==
- New Zealand literature
- List of print media in New Zealand
