= Flora Scales =

New Zealand painter and printmaker (1887–1985)

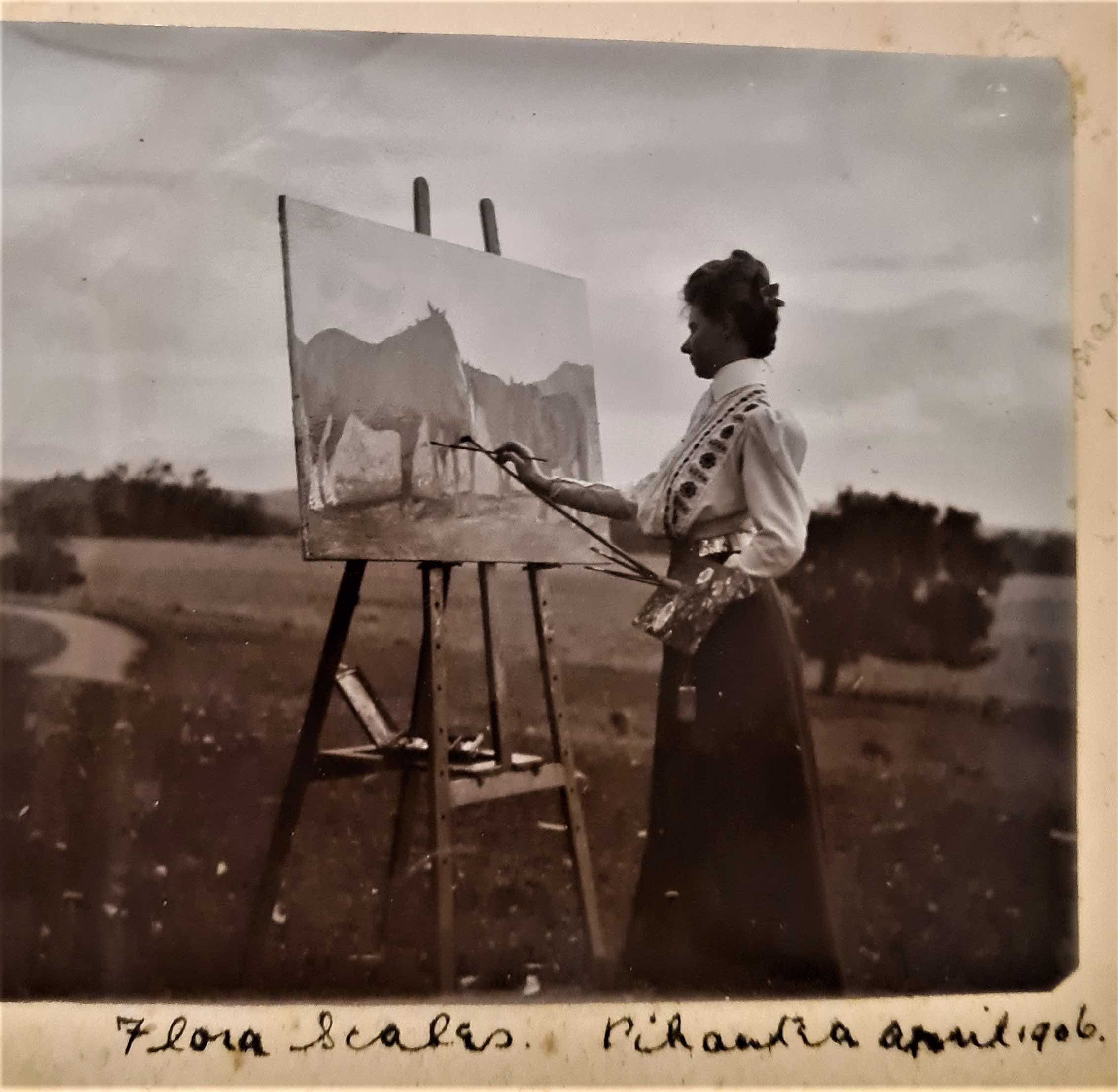
- Scales painting a horse, outside in Pihautea, Wairarapa, Aotearoa New Zealand, in 1906.
- Born: Helen Flora Victoria Scales; May 24, 1887; Lower Hutt, New Zealand
- Died: January 11, 1985 (aged 97); Rotorua
- Known for: Painting
- Website: https://florascales.com/

Helen Flora Victoria Scales (1887–1985) was a notable New Zealand artist. She was born in Lower Hutt, Wellington, New Zealand in 1887.

== Early life ==
Flora Scales was born in Te Awakairangi ki Tai Lower Hutt, in Aotearoa New Zealand. She was the second-born, eldest daughter in a well-off, influential family of five children. Her position of privilege afforded her a good education and opportunity to explore her interest and talent for art.

At the age of 16, Scales was sent to Christchurch to attend the Canterbury College School of Art.

In 1908 Scales left New Zealand to study painting in England with animal painter William Frank Calderon. In 1911 her Cattle mustering in New Zealand was exhibited at the Royal Academy of Arts. Scales returned to New Zealand after four years in England and continued to paint and exhibit.

In 1919, Scales's father, George Herbert Scales, announced he was going to divorce Gertrude Maynard Snow (Scales's mother) and marry his secretary. Scales, her mother and sister, moved to Whakatū Nelson where Scales worked in various jobs (such as domestic servant, and in a canning factory) to help support the family.

== Career ==
Her father died in 1928, leaving her a small legacy that allowed her to concentrate on painting. Scales travelled again to Europe in 1928, spending time working at the Académie de la Grande Chaumière. Dissatisfied by the teaching at the academy, Scales travelled to Munich where she attended Hans Hofmann's art school, and over the winter of 1932–33 studied Hofmann's principles of modernism with Edmund Kinzinger. She returned to New Zealand in 1934, where she exhibits paintings at the Suter Art Society in Nelson, the New Zealand Academy of Fine Arts Annual Exhibition in Wellington, and the New Zealand Society of Artists Second Exhibition in Christchurch.

In 1935, she returned to London and then moved to France. During WWII she was imprisoned at Besançon and Vittel. Upon her release, Scales discovered that hundreds of her stored artwork had been plundered by the Nazis and lost.

Although Scales continued to paint throughout her life, the first solo exhibition of her work in a public gallery was not held until 1975, organised by Colin McCahon and the Auckland Art Gallery. Reviewing the exhibition, art historian Neil Rowe wrote in Art New Zealand:

One of the more extraordinary stories in the history of New Zealand art is that of the rediscovery of eighty-eight-year-old Miss Helen F. V. Scales (better known as Flora Scales) after a forty years disappearance. Over this period her importance in a historical context has become considerable. About a year ago Auckland gallery directors Barry Lett and Kim Wright met Miss Scales living and painting in Auckland, after having returned unheralded from the United Kingdom. An exhibition was mounted at Auckland City Art Gallery last December (incredibly her first one-man show in a public gallery) and shown recently at the Peter McLeavey Gallery in July.

Scales continued to paint and draw throughout her entire life. She spent her final years living in Rotorua Masonic Village, where she conducted a series of conversations with Majorie de Lange about her life and work. In 1979, Janet Paul, then curator at the Alexander Turnbull Library, organised the acquisition of Scales's papers and 17 of her works to the Library's collection.

In 2018, The Suter Gallery Te Aratoi o Whakatū staged a significant solo exhibition of Scales's work.

In 2021, a comprehensive website and catalogue of her life and work was launched.

== Art ==
In her early years, Flora Scales painted landscapes, seascapes, boats, and other rural work and activities. In her more mature work, she continue to paint the places she lived and the natural environment around her: landscapes, interior still lifes, studies of flowers, and a few portraits. Throughout her life, she loved to paint outdoors.

Her paintings from the 1930s in and around the Mediterranean show villages overlooking the sea, often framed, or interrupted, by trees and fields, and empty of people. In later work, the structures in her paintings become less distinct, and a building is often rendered by a few loose brushstrokes that melt into its surroundings. For example, Church at Bry-sur-Marne from 1960, where the spire of a church is subtly suggested by the cone of grey paint in the background. Or, Boarding House, St Ives, Cornwall (1968–1970), where the white boarding house blends with the sea and rock around it.

Scales would paint multiple paintings of a subject or scene, taken from different angles, and exploring different compositions and palettes. For example, she painted a series of works about a plum orchard in Bry-sur-Marne in France, between 1969 and 1970. Though they were painted in the same location, and there are some shared motifs (a V form recurs), these paintings are very different from each other, and demonstrate Scales's varied visual vocabulary and continued experimentation with form, colour, and light.

== Influence ==
On her return to New Zealand in 1934 Scales met artist Toss Woollaston in Nelson, and allowed him to study her notes from Hofmann's training. Woollaston later cited the importance of this encounter on the development of his painting in his autobiographical text The far-away hills : a meditation on New Zealand landscape (1960). In a short article about Scales's return to Aotearoa New Zealand, Neil Rowe wrote in the first edition of Art New Zealand, in 1976:

In viewing a representative body of her work (forty- three paintings from 1939 to 1970) we can see the stylistic influence Miss Scales, and indirectly Hans Hoffman, had on the young Woollaston, and ultimately on his mature style. Hans Hoffman has been a seminal influence in post-war American art, and on the New York school and Jackson Pollock in particular. That his theories and techniques radically influenced one of our own important painters is entirely due to Flora Scales.

Rowe's article is representative of the nature of critical discourse of the time, which frequently failed to address or give credit to female artists. In Rowe's article, for example, the only importance that Scales is conferred is because of her transference of information from one male artist to another. No mention is given to her work in its own right.

Scales' life and painting has inspired contemporary New Zealand artist Ruth Buchanan. Buchanan showed a work based on her research into Scales at City Gallery Wellington in 2011–12.

== Collections ==
Works by Scales are held in the permanent collections of the Alexander Turnbull Library, Auckland Art Gallery Toi o Tāmaki, Christchurch Art Gallery, The Dowse Art Museum and the Museum of New Zealand Te Papa Tongarewa. A catalogue raisonné is available online.
