= Nine Short Pieces for Piano =

Nine Short Pieces for Piano is a set of small-scale compositions by Douglas Lilburn. They were written around 1965 and published in 1969, chosen in 1967 with pianist Margaret Nielsen from a folder of similarly brief manuscripts labelled "crotchety at 51". They are about twelve minutes long in total.

These pieces were among the last that Lilburn composed for acoustic instruments; he began to focus on electronic experimentation in 1965. Each piece is constructed from one or two concise motifs. With a harmonic and rhythmic texture drawing from his electronic music, these pieces explore the full extent of the piano's range and dynamics; "looking as modern music should look". They are also notated in an unorthodox manner.
