= Robert William Lowry (printer) =

New Zealand printer, publisher, typographer and teacher (1912–1963)

- Bob Lowry, 30 May 1947; Photo: Clifton Firth
- Born: 17 November 1912; Paeroa, New Zealand
- Died: 7 December 1963 (aged 51)
- Occupations: Printer, publisher, typographer and teacher

Robert William Lowry (17 November 1912 – 7 December 1963) was a New Zealand printer, publisher, typographer and teacher.

== Biography ==
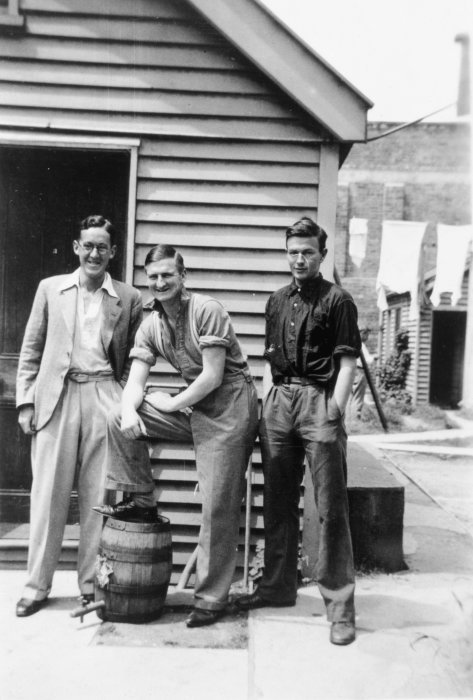
Left to right: Ian Milner, Denis Glover and Bob Lowry at the 'Dog-box', St Elmos flats, Christchurch, in December 1933

Lowry was born in Paeroa, New Zealand, on 17 November 1912. He was the eldest child of Janet (Jessie) Craig Forrest and Robert William Lowry, a storekeeper, farmer and carpenter from Ireland.

He was educated at Auckland Grammar School, where he first became interested in typography, and at Auckland University College (1931–1933). He was conferred a bachelor of arts degree during war service in 1943. While still at university, he undertook several printing enterprises, including the printing of The Phoenix, the journal of the university's literary club. At this time Lowry was an admirer of Francis Meynell, Eric Gill and Stanley Morison, as well as Tschichold.

During World War II he served with the 2NZEF in New Caledonia and printed the Forces newspaper in the Pacific.

After university Lowry set up the Unicorn Press, and later the Pelorus Press.

== Mentioned in ==
Lowry has been mentioned in many publications:

- Barrowman, Rachel (2008). "R. A. K. Mason, 1905–1971". Kōtare: New Zealand Notes & Queries. 7 (3): 158–171. doi:10.26686/knznq.v7i3.713.
- Brasch, Charles. "Eight — Hallenstein Bros". Indirections: A Memoir 1909–1947. Wellington: Oxford University Press. p. 185 – via NZETC.
- Fairburn, A. R. D. (1966). Collected Poems. Christchurch: Pegasus Press. p. 144 – via NZETC. Poem Addressed to Mr Robert Lowry on the Occasion of the Birth of his Fourth Daughter
- Hamilton, Stephen (1998). "Red Hot Gospels of Highbrows: R. A. K. Mason and the Demise of Phoenix". Kōtare: New Zealand Notes & Queries. 1 (1): 5–11. doi:10.26686/knznq.v1i1.582.
- Hamilton, Stephen (1999). "A Bibliographical Description and Nominal Index to The Phoenix, Auckland University College, 1932-1933". Kōtare: New Zealand Notes & Queries. 2 (1): 30–38. doi:10.26686/knznq.v2i1.599.
- Hamilton, Stephen (2008). "Charles Brasch, 1909–1973". Kōtare: New Zealand Notes & Queries. 7 (3): 172–179. doi:10.26686/knznq.v7i3.714.
- Hughes, Peter (2000). "Eleven: Bob Lowry and the Pelorus Press, 1945–53". In Griffith, Penny; Hughes, Peter; Loney, Alan (eds.). A Book in the Hand: Essays on the History of the Book in New Zealand. Wellington: Auckland University Press. pp. ix, 165–169 – via NZETC..
- Jones, Lawrence (2008). "Frank Sargeson [Norris Frank Davey], 1903–1982". Kōtare: New Zealand Notes & Queries. 7 (2): 157–211. doi:10.26686/knznq.v7i2.672.
- Jones, Lawrence (2008). "Roderick Finlayson, 1904–1992". Kōtare: New Zealand Notes & Queries. 7 (2): 212–225. doi:10.26686/knznq.v7i2.673.
- Mallet, A. (1950). "Craft at the Academy". Design Review. Vol. 3, no. 3, November–December. p. 72 – via NZETC.
- Parsons, Peter (1 October 1965). "The Postwar Development of Industrial Design in New Zealand". New Zealand Manufacturer. Vol. 18, no. ID65. New Zealand Manufacturers’ Federation (Inc.).
- Shieff, Sarah (2008). "Denis Glover, 1912–1980". Kōtare: New Zealand Notes & Queries. 7 (3): 189–215. doi:10.26686/knznq.v7i3.716.
- Steer, Philip (2007). "Elsie Locke, 1912–2001". Kōtare: New Zealand Notes & Queries. 7 (1): 177–184. doi:10.26686/knznq.v7i1.781.
- Taylor, Nancy M. (1986). "23. The Arts Survive". The New Zealand People at War: The Home Front. Vol. 2. Wellington: Historical Publications Branch, Department of Internal Affairs. p. 1187. ISBN 0477012604 – via NZETC.
