= William O'Leary =

William O'Leary is the name of:

- William O'Leary (actor)
- William O'Leary (Irish politician)
- William O'Leary (British Army officer)
- William Hagarty O'Leary, 1874–1880, Member of Parliament
- William James O'Leary, New Zealand prospector
