= William James O'Leary =

William James O'Leary (born 28 October 1865 at Tuapeka).

He was a bushman, and spent many years looking for gold in the Arawata River area, and never struck it rich, dying in 1947. Together with his mare Dolly, he wandered around the Westland for decades looking for gold.

In 1953 poet Denis Glover wrote Arawata Bill immortalizing him as the solitary New Zealand prospector.

O'Leary's Paddock is a street in Queenstown named after him.
