= Anna Caselberg =

New Zealand painter

- Born: Anna Margaret Frances Woollaston; 1942; Māpua, New Zealand
- Died: 2004 (aged 61–62)
- Spouse: John Caselberg (m. 1960; died 2004)
- Relatives: Toss Woollaston (father); Philip Woollaston (brother)

Anna Margaret Frances Caselberg (née Woollaston, 1942–2004) was a New Zealand painter.

Born in 1942, Caselberg was the daughter of Edith Winifred Woollaston (née Alexander) and the painter Toss Woollaston. She studied at the University of Auckland, spending a year living with Colin McCahon and his family during this time. In 1960 she married poet John Caselberg, who—12 years older than her—was friends with both her father and McCahon.

Anna Caselberg worked in oils and watercolour, mostly painting landscapes, and her style is said to show the influences of Colin McCahon and her father. She exhibited with The Group in 1975. Her work is held in public collections in New Zealand, including those of the Museum of New Zealand Te Papa Tongarewa, Suter Art Gallery, Hocken Collections, and the Dunedin Public Art Gallery.

Caselberg died of cancer in late 2004, six months after her husband's death, also from cancer. The Caselberg Trust, a charitable trust supporting artists, writers and composers by providing residencies at the Caselbergs' former house at Broad Bay on Otago Peninsula, is named in honour of John and Anna Caselberg.
