= Denis Glover =

New Zealand poet and publisher (1912–1980)

Denis Glover DSC
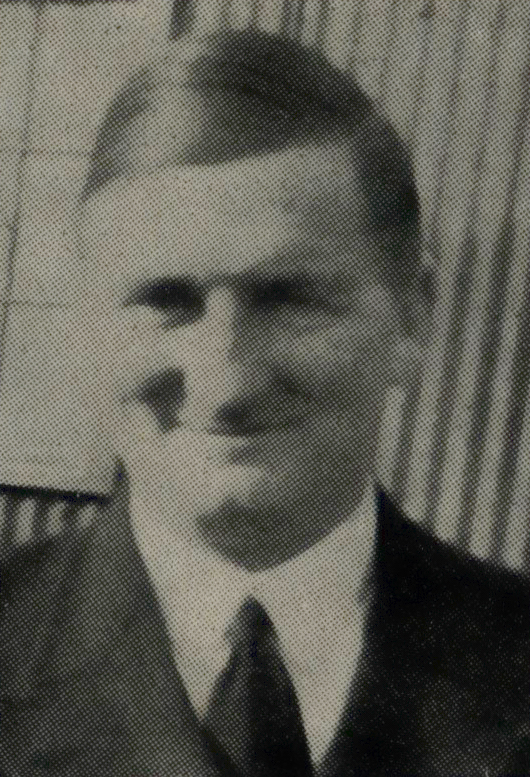
- Born: Denis James Matthews Glover; 9 December 1912; Dunedin, New Zealand
- Died: 9 August 1980 (aged 67); Wellington, New Zealand
- Education: University of Canterbury, BA
- Occupations: Poet; publisher
- Spouses: Mary Granville (m. 1936; div. 1970) Gladys Evelyn Cameron (m. 1971)
- Partner: Khura Skelton (1954–1969)

Denis James Matthews Glover DSC (9 December 1912 – 9 August 1980) was a New Zealand poet and publisher. Born in Dunedin, he attended the University of Canterbury where he obtained a Bachelor of Arts, and subsequently lectured. He worked as a reporter and editor for a time, and in 1937 founded the Caxton Press, which published the works of many well-known New Zealand writers of the day (including Glover's own poetry). After a period of service in World War II, he and his friend Charles Brasch founded the literary magazine Landfall, which Caxton began publishing in 1947.

Glover's later years were marred by alcoholism, forcing him to resign from Caxton Press and subsequent roles, and affecting his personal life. After a move to Wellington with a new partner, he continued to work as a copywriter, publisher and teacher, and amongst other things served as a member of the New Zealand Literary Fund Advisory Committee from 1955 to 1958 and as president of the Friends of the Turnbull Library from 1963 to 1965. In the mid-1970s he was awarded an honorary doctorate of literature from Victoria University of Wellington. During his life he published many poetry collections and other works; one of his best-known poems is "The Magpies" (1941).

== Early life and education ==
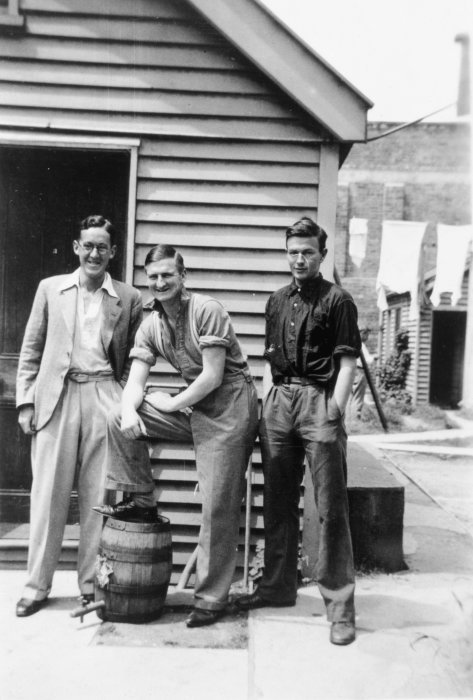
Left to right: Ian Milner, Denis Glover, and Robert William Lowry at the 'Dog-box', St Elmos flats, Christchurch. Taken by an unidentified photographer in December 1933.

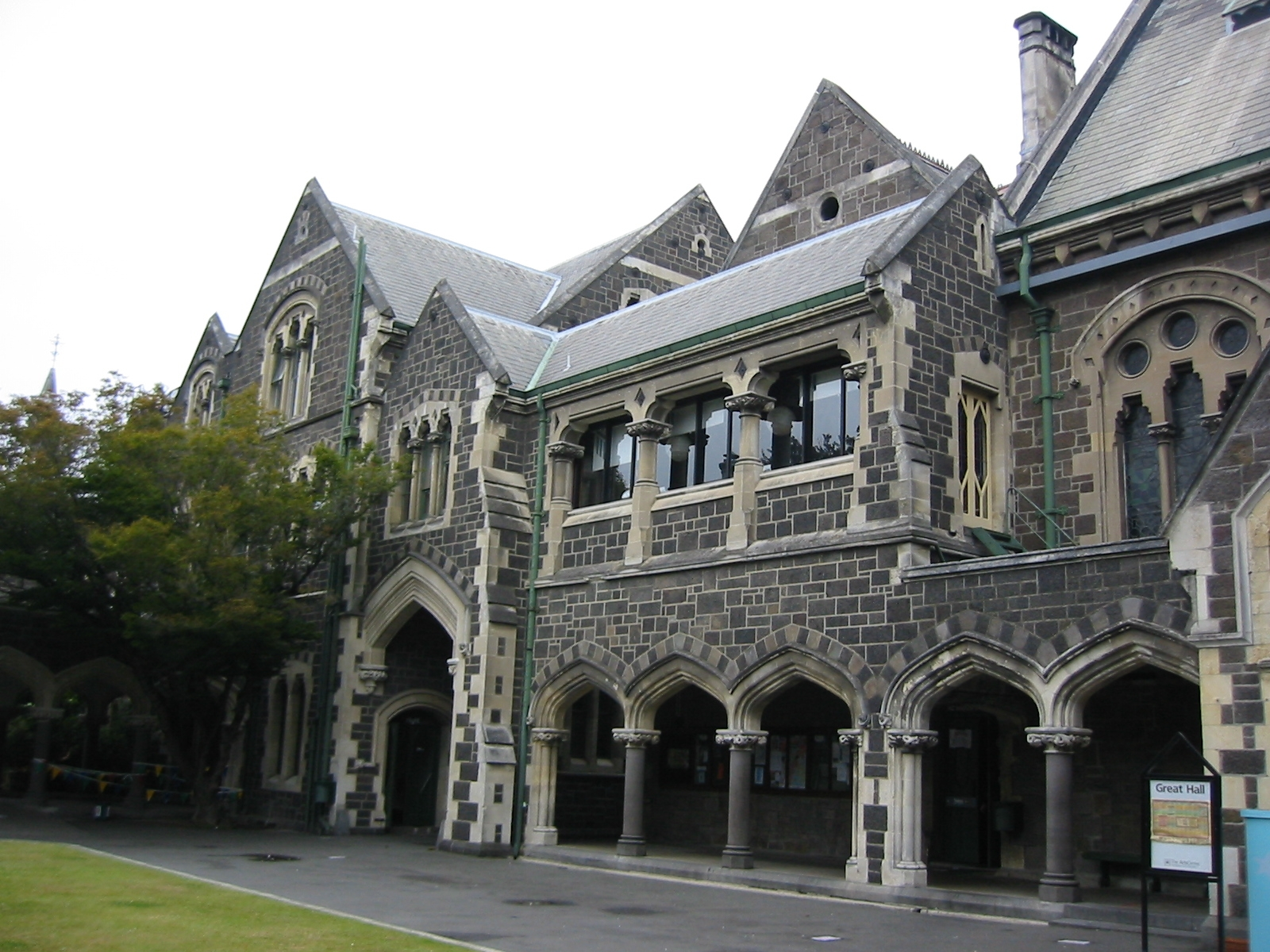
The Christchurch Arts Centre, formerly part of the campus of the University of Canterbury, which Glover attended in the 1930s.

Glover was born in Dunedin on 9 December 1912. His parents were Henry Lawrence Glover, a dentist, and Lyla Jean Matthews. Glover went to Arthur Street School, Dunedin, until moving with his mother in 1925 to New Plymouth. He attended Central School there, being awarded dux. He was also a Boy Scout and school cadet during this period. In 1926 he attended New Plymouth Boys' High School, before moving to Auckland where he attended Auckland Grammar School. There, he and Bob Lowry published an unofficial school journal La Verite. He finally moved to Christchurch in 1929 where he attended Christ's College until 1930. Glover was a popular and keen swimmer, boxer, and cross-country athlete at college.

From 1931, Glover attended the University of Canterbury, studying Greek, Latin, philosophy, and English for a Bachelor of Arts in English and Greek. While at university, he was captain of the boxing club and fought in the welterweight division, obtaining a University blue. He also played rugby for the Old Collegians and sailed yachts. Glover was a member of the Canterbury Mountaineering Club and Christchurch Classical Association. His mountaineering experiences formed the basis for his later Arawata Bill and Sings Harry poems. On 8 January 1936 he married Mary Granville.

== Career ==
From 1936 to 1938, he was an assistant lecturer in English and reported university news for the Press until he wrote an article advocating trial marriage, which angered the university. Well known for radical leftist opinions, he was often in trouble with authorities. In addition to writing for the Press, Glover edited New Zealand Motor Owner, the Canterbury University College Review, and Students Association newspaper Canta. In 1934 he interviewed George Bernard Shaw for the newspaper.

== Caxton Press ==
In 1932 at the university sports tournament in Auckland he again met up with Lowry. Lowry had by this time set up a press for the Auckland University Students Association and was publishing a magazine called Phoenix. Returning to Canterbury Glover formed the Caxton Club with the aim of studying printing and typography. In 1937 together with John Drew he founded the Caxton Press. The Caxton Press enabled Glover to pursue his interest in publishing. Caxton published the early works of many New Zealand writers such as Ursula Bethell, R. A. K. Mason, Allen Curnow, Charles Brasch, Frank Sargeson and A. R. D. Fairburn. Glover's own poems were also printed.

== Military service ==
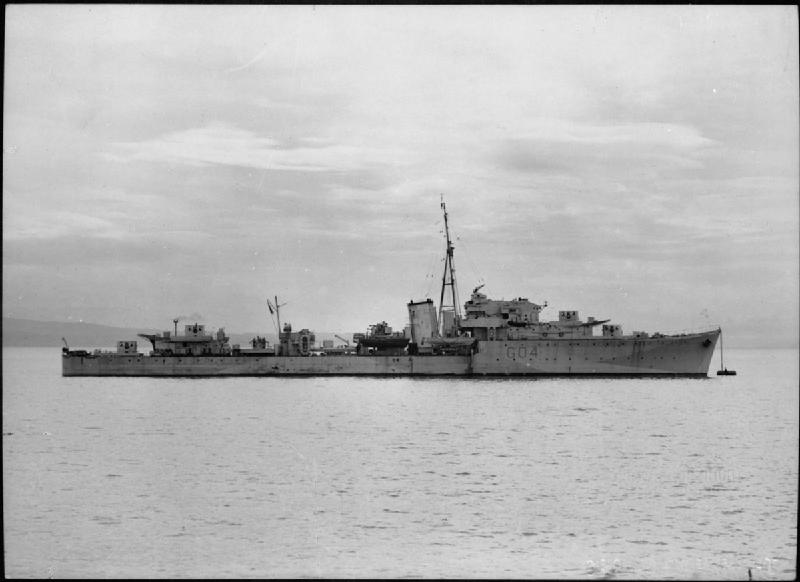
HMS Onslaught

His work at the Press was interrupted by service with the Royal Navy in World War II. He had wanted to join the Royal New Zealand Navy but as there were no suitable vacancies he applied under a programme which sent New Zealand naval recruits to the United Kingdom on loan to the Royal Navy. He left Christchurch for Auckland, then embarking on the Dominion Monarch for HMS Ganges at Shotley, Suffolk, England, arriving in February 1942.

After a short period of training he was assigned to the newly completed destroyer HMS Onslaught for its sea trials. The Onslaught was then tasked with escorting Arctic convoys to Murmansk, Russia. In 1943 Glover undertook officer training at HMS King Alfred being promoted to Lieutenant on 29 October. He was placed in command of infantry landing craft LCI(S) 516. During this time he provided sea training for various infantry units and took part in sorties across the Channel to France. In June 1944 he took Lord Lovat's 6th commando brigade 2 Troop under Lt-Colonel Mills-Roberts, to Ouistreham, Normandy (near Sword Beach) on D-Day earning a Distinguished Service Cross for bravery. Glover and his crew had rescued 233 Warwickshire Regiment infantrymen from the sinking LCI(L) 130 and later that same day the crew of a sister ship LCI(S) 517, which was under command of a fellow New Zealander Lieutenant Joseph Gaunt. Glover returned to New Zealand in 1944 and joined the Royal New Zealand Naval Volunteer Reserve where he rose to the rank of Lieutenant-Commander on 29 October 1951.

In 1975, Glover was presented with the Soviet Union's war veterans medal for his service on the Russian convoys.

== Post-war life and career ==
During 1944, while on leave in London, Glover stayed with his New Zealand friend Charles Brasch. Together they developed the idea for a new literary magazine. This became Landfall, which Caxton began publishing in March 1947. From 1945 to 1948 Glover served on the Canterbury University College Council, while also working at Caxton. His work was hindered however by a growing drinking problem and he was dismissed at the end of 1951. He began working for Albion Wright at Pegasus Press but was again dismissed. During this period he separated from his wife; they did not divorce until 1970. In 1950 he began a relationship with Khura Skelton and they moved to Paekākāriki in 1954, but his drinking problem descended into alcoholism. Kura died in 1969.

In 1954, Glover worked for Carlton, Carruthers, du Chateau and King as an advertising copywriter and subsequently for Wingfield Press from 1954 to 1962 as production manager and typographer. He tutored for the Technical Correspondence Institute from 1964 to 1973. During the late 1950s he helped develop the Mermaid Press and in 1971 founded the Cats-paw Press. He was a member of the New Zealand Literary Fund Advisory Committee from 1955 to 1958 and president of the Friends of the Turnbull Library from 1963 to 1965.

Glover married Gladys Evelyn Cameron (née Stevens) on 21 September 1971. In 1975 he was invited to visit Russia by the Soviet Writers Union. Later that year he was awarded an honorary doctorate of literature from Victoria University of Wellington and elected president of honour of the New Zealand Centre of PEN. On 7 August 1980, Glover fell down some steps at Breaker Bay and injured himself. He died two days later from bronchopneumonia.

== Works ==
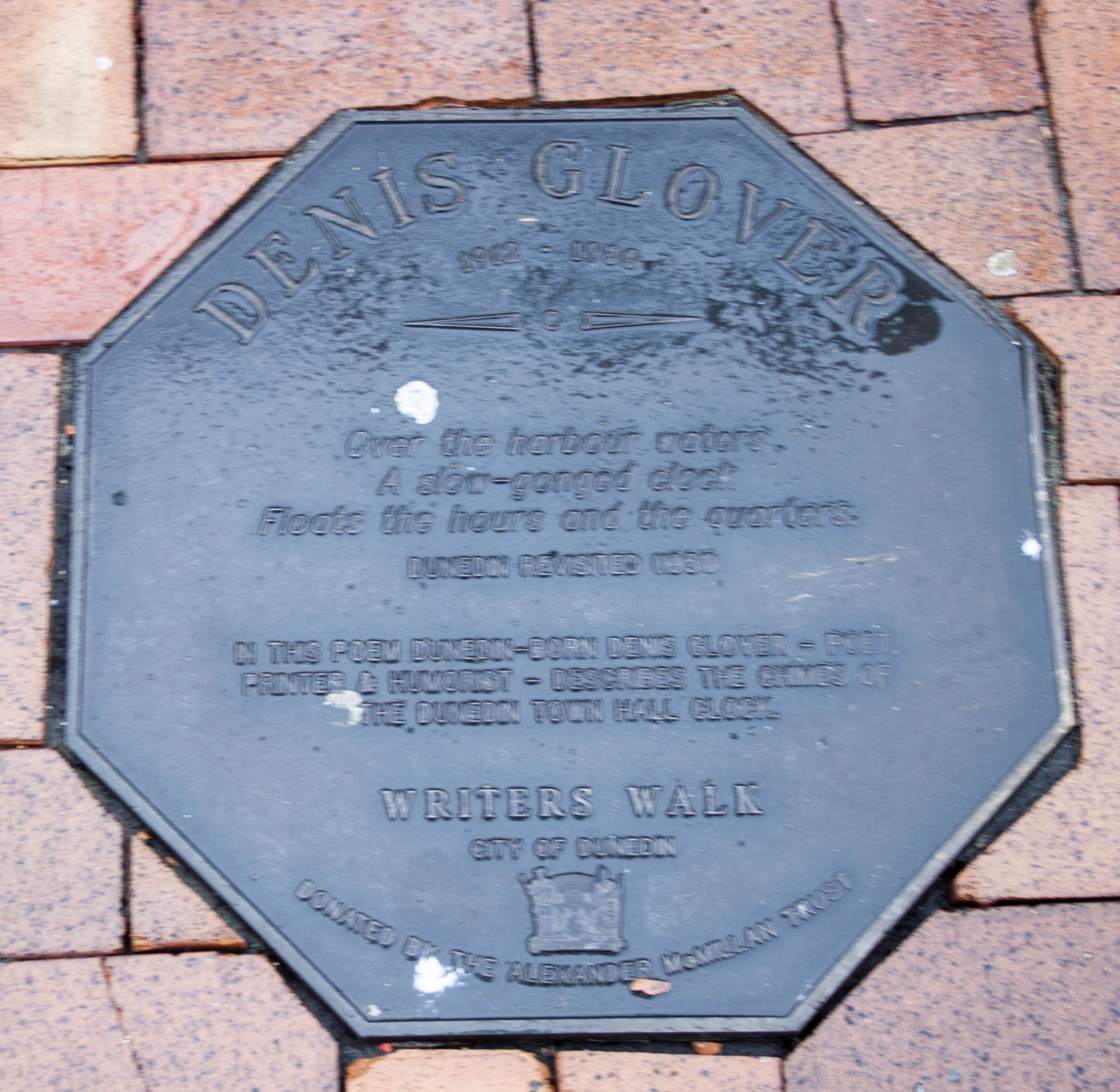
Memorial plaque dedicated to Denis Glover in Dunedin, on the Writers' Walk on the Octagon

=== Books ===
- Thistledown, Christchurch, Caxton Club Press, 1935
- Short Reflection on the Present State of Literature in This Country, Christchurch, Caxton Club Press, 1935
- Six Easy Ways of Dodging Debt Collectors, Christchurch, Caxton Press, 1936
- Three Short Stories, Christchurch, Caxton Press, 1936
- What are New Zealand Authors Writing?, Christchurch, Caxton Press, 1936
- The Arraignment of Paris, Christchurch, Caxton Press, 1937
- Thirteen Poems, Christchurch, Caxton, 1939
- Till the Star Speak, Christchurch, Caxton Press, 1939
- Cold Tongue, Christchurch, Caxton Press, 1940
- A Specimen Book of Printing Types, Christchurch, Caxton Press, 1940
- A Catalogue of Publications from the Caxton Press, Christchurch, up to February 1941, Christchurch, Caxton Press, 1941
- D-Day Christchurch, Caxton, 1944
- The Wind and the Sand: Poems 1934–44, Christchurch, Caxton, 1945
- Summer Flowers, Christchurch, Caxton Press, 1946
- Printing Types: A Second Specimen Book of Faces Commonly Used at the Caxton Press, Christchurch, New Zealand, Christchurch, Caxton Press, 1948
- Sings Harry and Other Poems, Christchurch, Caxton, 1951; second edition 1957
- Arawata Bill: A Sequence of Poems, Christchurch, Pegasus Press, 1953, and Wellington, Mermaid Press, 1957
- A Clutch of Authors and a Clot, Wellington, Denis Glover, 1960
- Hot Water Sailor, Wellington, A.H. and A.W. Reed, 1962
- Denis Glover's Bedside Book, Wellington, Reed, 1963
- Enter Without Knocking: Selected Poems, Christchurch, Pegasus, 1964; second enlarged edition 1971
- Sharp Edge Up: Verses and Satires, Auckland, Blackwood and Janet Paul, 1968
- Myself When Young, Christchurch, Nag's Head Press, 1970
- To A Particular Woman, Christchurch, Nag's Head Press, 1970
- Diary to a Woman, Wellington, Catspaw Press, 1971
- Wellington Harbour, Wellington, Catspaw Press, 1974
- Dancing to my Tune, Wellington, Catspaw Press, 1974
- Clutha: River Poems, Dunedin, John McIndoe, 1977
- Come High Water, Palmerston North, Dunmore Press, 1977
- Men of God, Palmerston North, Dunmore Press, 1978
- Or Hawk or Basilisk, Wellington, Catspaw Press, 1978
- For Whom the Cock Crows, Dunedin, John McIndoe, 1978
- To Friends in Russia, Christchurch, Nag's Head Press, 1979
- Towards Banks Peninsula, Christchurch, Pegasus, 1979
- Hot Water Sailor and Landlubber Ho!, Auckland, Collins, 1981

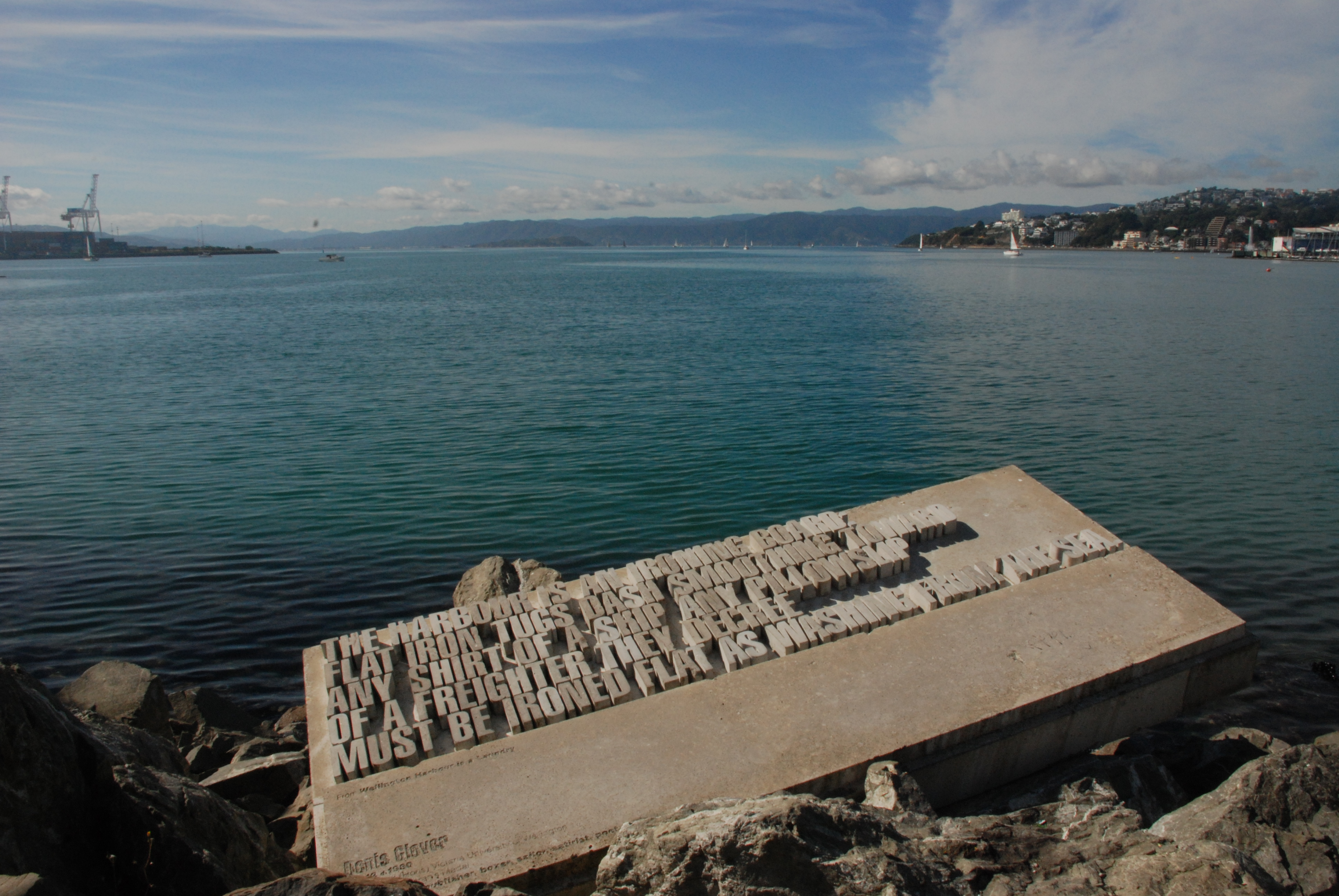
An excerpt from Glover's poem "Wellington Harbour is a Laundry" is on the Wellington waterfront

=== Collections ===
- Denis Glover: Selected Poems, ed. Allen Curnow Auckland, Penguin, 1981
- Denis Glover: Selected Poems, ed. Bill Manhire Wellington, Victoria University Press, 1995
- Letters of Denis Glover, ed. Sarah Shieff, Dunedin, Otago University Press, 2020.

=== Scripts ===
- The Coaster, Verse commentary by Glover' New Zealand National Film Unit, 1948
- They Always Float at Sea, radio drama. NZBC, 1966
- The Magpies, short film, Martyn Sanderson, New Zealand, Ripoff Productions, 1974

=== Recordings ===
- Sings Harry. Poems by Glover, music by Douglas Lilburn, Kiwi Records, 1961
- Sings Harry. Poems by Glover, music by Douglas Lilburn. Kiwi Records, 1977
- Arawata Bill and Other Verse, read by Glover, Kiwi Records, 1971
- Mick Stimpson short film, directed by Rupert Glover and John Laing, New Zealand, Ripoff Productions, 1974

=== Music ===
- Douglas Lilburn set some of his poems to music, and later used a theme from his setting of "Sings Harry" in his Third Symphony (1961, published by Faber Music around 1968).
- The Great New Zealand Songbook, Auckland, Godwit Press, 1991
- Sings Harry, Dunedin, Otago University Press, 1966
- Sings Harry, Wellington, Waiteata Press, 1991
- The Magpies, unpublished manuscript, Dunedin, Otago University Extension Dept, 1954
- The Six Volts – The Magpies The Hills are Alive, Braille Records, 1990
- Builders – Magpies authorised reinterpretation, Beatin Hearts 1982

=== Other ===
- Motoring, vols 1–6. Edited by Glover. Christchurch: Canterbury Automobile Association, 1931-1937
- Oriflamme, no. 1. Edited by Glover. Christchurch: Canterbury College Caxton Club, April 1933
- Sirocco. Edited by Glover. Christchurch: The Caxton Club Press, July 1933
- New Poems. Selected by Glover and Ian Milner. Christchurch: The Caxton Club Press, 1934
- Another Argo Poems by Allen Curnow, A. R. D. Fairburn and Glover. Christchurch: The Caxton Club Press, 1935
- Verse Alive. Selected by H. Winston Rhodes and Glover. Christchurch: The Caxton Press, 1936
- Verse Alive Number Two. Selected by H. Winston Rhodes and Glover. Christchurch: The Caxton Press, 1937
- A Caxton Miscellany Poems by Lawrence Baigent, Allen Curnow, Peter Middleton, Robin Hyde, A. R. D. Fairburn and Glover. Christchurch: Caxton, 1937
- Recent Poems by Allen Curnow, A. R. D. Fairburn, R. A. K. Mason and Glover. Christchurch: Caxton, 1941
- Book: A Miscellany Nos. 1–9. Edited by Glover. Christchurch: Caxton Press, 1941–47
- Poetry Harbinger: Introducing A. R. D. Fairburn (6-foot 3) and Denis Glover (11 stone 7). Poems by A. R. D. Fairburn and Glover. Auckland: The Pilgrim Press, 1958
- Cross Currents: A Selection by Denis Glover of Sonnets by Merrill Moore, 1903-57 Christchurch: Pegasus Press, 1961
- Quaffers' Gazette, nos1-22. Edited by Glover. Hamilton: Waikato Breweries Ltd, 1962–66
- Poetry and the Present, Canterbury University College Review (1934): 29-32
- Pointers to Parnassus: A Consideration of the Morepork and the Muse, Tomorrow 30 October 1935): 16-18
- Poetry out of its Pram, Tomorrow, 28 October 1936: 20-23
- Communists and Soviet Policy, Tomorrow, 10 January 1940: 155-158
- Convoy Conversation Penguin New Writing, 16 (January–March 1943): 15-21
- New Zealand Books and their Availability: The Publisher's Point of View, New Zealand Library Association: Proceedings of the 16th Conference (1947): 48-49
- Typography and the Librarian, New Zealand Libraries 10 no. 11 (December 1947): 225-230 and New Zealand Libraries, 11:1 (Jan-Feb 1948): 48-49
- Some Notes on Typography, Year Book of the Arts in New Zealand, 5 (1949): 165-172
- Verse Commentary for a Film, Landfall, 3: 2 (June 1949): 170-176
- Thoughts in the Suburban Tram, Landfall, 5: 4 (December 1951): 265-267
- The Doorknob, Here and Now (May 1952): 20
- Outlook for Poetry, New Zealand Poetry Yearbook, 5 (1955): 9-11
- The New Zealand Literary Fund, Landfall, 23: 3 (Sept 1969): 273-282
- The Nag's Head Press, Islands 1: 1 (Spring 1972): 53-54
- Tribute to Charles Brasch, Islands, 2: 3 (Spring 1973): 244-245
- A Fair Go, Islands, 7: 2 (Nov 1978): 211-212

Glover's best-known works are the Sings Harry sequence (1951), "Arawata Bill", and "The Magpies" (1941). The refrain of the latter ("Quardle oodle ardle wardle doodle", imitating the sound of the Australian magpie) is one of the most famous lines in New Zealand poetry.

Playwright Roger Hall wrote a play called Mr Punch about Glover's life.

== Sources ==
- Shieff, Sarah (8 June 2012). "Denis Glover, 1912–1980". Kōtare: New Zealand Notes & Queries. 7 (3). doi:10.26686/knznq.v7i3.716. ISSN 1174-6955.
