= William Southgate =

New Zealand conductor and composer

Sir William David Southgate (born 4 August 1941) is a New Zealand conductor and composer. He was the first New Zealand-based artist to be knighted (as a Knight Bachelor, in 1994).

== Biography ==
Southgate was born in Waipukurau in 1941 to Alfred John and Phyllis (née Maden) Southgate, and grew up in Otago. He showed an interest in music early in life and at about the age of five, he discovered a pianola which encouraged him to learn the piano. At the age of nine, he recorded in his diary that he had decided to dedicate his life to music.

Southgate attended Otago Boys' High School from 1954 to 1959 and afterwards, the University of Otago. He graduated with Master of Arts and Bachelor of Music degrees, both with first class honours, and also taught composition, instrumentation and fugue. Among his pupils was his future wife, Rosemary Martin. They were married in 1967.

In 1967, Southgate left New Zealand for London. He studied advanced conducting at the Guildhall School of Music and Drama having received post-graduate scholarships and graduated with the Ricordi Conductors' Prize. While working in London, he also had the opportunity to compose incidental music for a number of theatre productions including scores for the Royal Shakespeare Company.

Southgate returned to New Zealand in 1974, where he was able to continue working as a composer, conductor, and arranger. During the 1980s, he was a regular broadcaster on Radio New Zealand, presenting programmes on many aspects of music and on diverse composers such as Wilhelm Stenhammar, Erich Wolfgang Korngold and Aram Khachaturian.

Southgate has had long associations, including terms as principal conductor, with both the Christchurch Symphony Orchestra and the New Zealand Symphony Orchestra (NZSO) and for a number of years with the Wellington Youth Orchestra which premiered his Symphony No. 1. In 1987, he embarked on a cultural exchange visit to Finland, which allowed him to conduct seven different orchestras over a period of seven weeks.

A recording of Southgate conducting the NZSO in the orchestral music of Douglas Lilburn was released on the Continuum label. His earlier recording of Ka Puke Maeroero, composed by Gary Daverne has been released by EMI.

In the 1995 New Year Honours, Southgate was appointed a Knight Bachelor, for services to music.

== Works ==
Southgate has composed three symphonies. His Second Symphony is subtitled Music from the Old World. The symphony includes allusions to New Zealand birdsong, for example the bellbird, kea, tui and grey warbler. At the conclusion of the symphony, a recording of actual birdsong is heard.
