= Kennaway Henderson =

New Zealand illustrator, cartoonist, editor and pacifist (1879–1960)

Andrew Kennaway Henderson (25 May 1879 – 17 January 1960) was a New Zealand clerk, illustrator, cartoonist, editor and pacifist. He was born in London, England, and emigrated to New Zealand as a child. He was imprisoned twice as a conscientious objector in World War I and drew numerous cartoons from a socialist point of view.

He edited and published the left-wing literary magazine Tomorrow in Christchurch, New Zealand from 1934 to 1940. In later life he published some books of drawings and cartoons, and died in Christchurch in 1960.
