= Douglas Lilburn =

New Zealand composer (1915–2001)

Douglas Lilburn ONZ
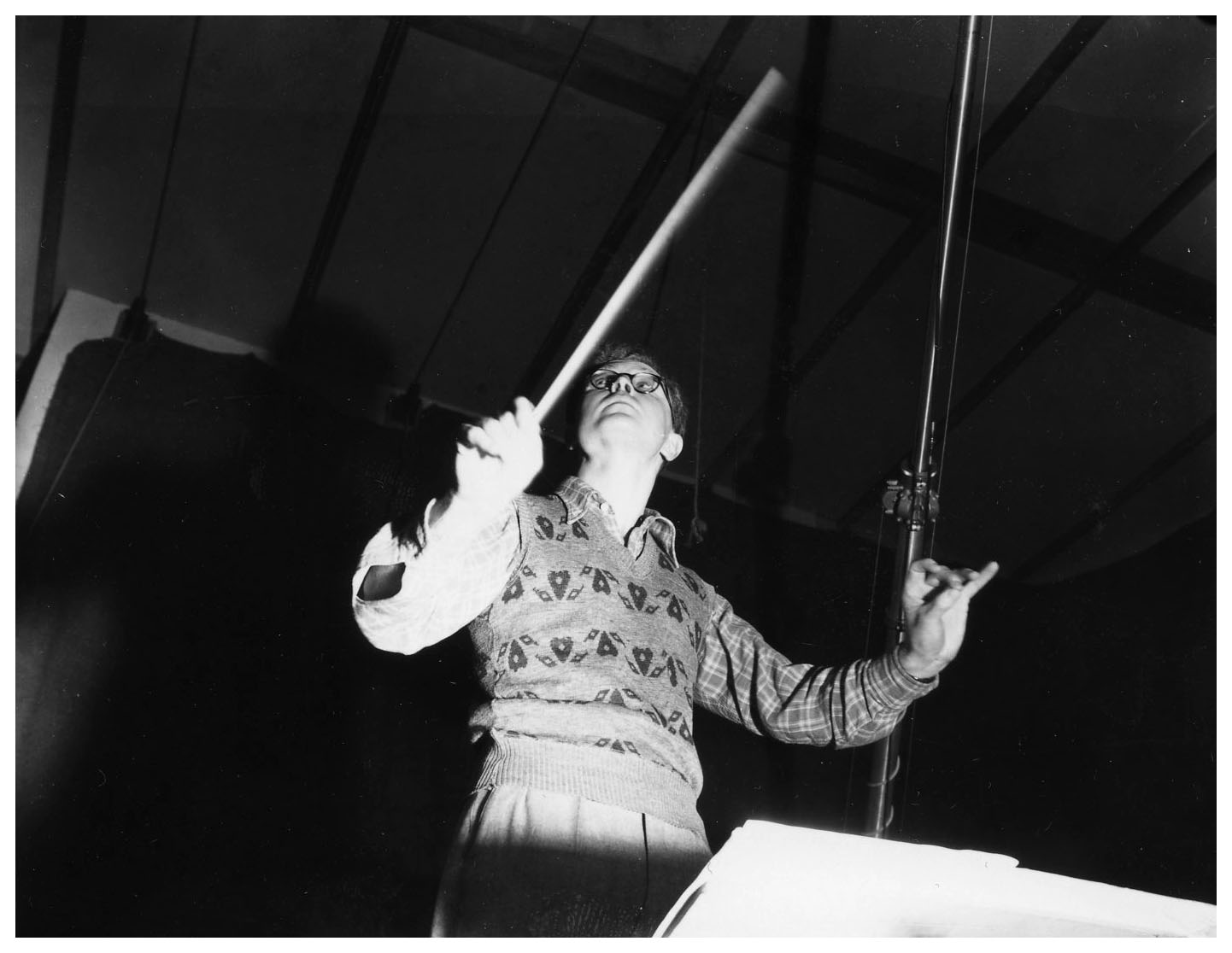
- Lilburn conducting the National Symphony Orchestra, 1948
- Born: 2 November 1915; Whanganui, New Zealand
- Died: 6 June 2001 (aged 85); Wellington, New Zealand
- Era: 20th century

Douglas Gordon Lilburn ONZ (2 November 1915 – 6 June 2001) was a New Zealand composer.

== Early life ==
Lilburn was born in Whanganui and spent his early years on the family sheep farm in the upper Turakina River valley at Drysdale. He attended Waitaki Boys' High School from 1930 to 1933, before moving to Christchurch to study journalism and music over the next three years at Canterbury University College, then part of the University of New Zealand. In 1936 his career in music was set when his tone poem Forest won visiting composer Percy Grainger's national composition competition. In 1937 he began studying at the Royal College of Music in London, where Ralph Vaughan Williams tutored him in composition until 1939. The two men remained close: in later years Lilburn sent Vaughan Williams gifts of New Zealand honey, knowing that the older man was fond of it. Letters of thanks from Vaughan Williams in 1947 and 1948 confirm this.

Lilburn's early works display the influence of Jean Sibelius. The symphonic poem Forest (1936), in which Lilburn depicts the autumn scenery of Mount Peel in South Canterbury, finds its composer, according to Robert Hoskins, "tracking Sibelius through the shadowy woods, keeping his own distance, but measuring his own hesitancy until he takes his own road." Furthermore, the Phantasy Quartet (1939) contains "Sibelian pizzicatos".

== Career ==
Lilburn returned to New Zealand in 1940 and served as guest conductor in Wellington for three months with the NBS String Orchestra. He moved to Christchurch in 1941 and worked as a freelance composer and teacher until 1947. Between 1946 and 1949 and again in 1951, he was Composer-in-Residence at the Cambridge Summer Music Schools.

During these years he was heavily involved in New Zealand arts activity, and became friends with other artists such as Allen Curnow, Denis Glover, Rita Angus, and Alistair Campbell.

In 1947, Lilburn moved back to Wellington to take up a position at Victoria University as part-time lecturer in music. He became a full-time lecturer in 1949, senior lecturer in 1955, was appointed Associate Professor of Music in 1963 and Professor with a personal chair in music in 1970. Following visits to studios in Europe and Canada in 1963, Lilburn founded the electronic music studio at the university in 1966 — the first in Australasia — and was its director until 1979, a year before his retirement.

== Later years ==
Lilburn was awarded an honorary doctorate by the University of Otago in 1969, and in 1978 was presented with the Citation for Services to New Zealand Music by the Composers Association of New Zealand. On 6 February 1988, Lilburn became the eighth appointee to the Order of New Zealand, and two years later he received the New Zealand 1990 Commemoration Medal.

Prizes and scholarships won by Lilburn include:

- the Percy Grainger Competition, 1936, for his tone poem Forest
- the Cobbett Prize, Royal College of Music, 1939, for Phantasy for String Quartet
- the Foli Scholarship and Hubert Parry Prize, Royal College of Music, 1939
- three out of four of the prizes in the New Zealand National Centennial Music Celebrations Competitions, 1940
- the Philip Neill Memorial Prize, 1944.

Lilburn was founder of Wai-te-ata Music Press in 1967 and the Lilburn Trust of the Alexander Turnbull Library, Wellington, 1984. His writings include A Search for Tradition, a talk given at the first Cambridge Summer School of Music in January 1946 (Alexander Turnbull Library, Wellington 1984) and A Search for Language, a University of Otago Open Lecture, March 1969 (Alexander Turnbull Library, 1985).

== Legacy ==
Lilburn's former house, at 22 Ascot Street, was purchased by the Lilburn Residence Trust, a charitable trust based in Wellington, on 5 August 2005. The trust currently offers use of the residence to the Creative New Zealand/Jack C. Richards Composer-in-Residence at the New Zealand School of Music.

The Lilburn Trust funds the Student Composition and Performance Awards at five universities around New Zealand. The trust is administered under the Alexander Turnbull Library Endowment Trust.

The New Zealand Symphony Orchestra has recorded most of Lilburn's major works, including the three symphonies composed from 1949 to 1961 and many of the other symphonic works. His A Song of Islands was given its American premiere on 17 November 2012, by the Fort Wayne Philharmonic Orchestra, conducted by James Judd, the former music director of the New Zealand Symphony Orchestra.

The Douglas Lilburn Auditorium forms part of the wider Christchurch Town Hall complex.

== Personal life ==
Although he had an affair with the painter Rita Angus, who became pregnant but miscarried, his later life was characterised by intimate relationships with men.

== Works ==
=== Orchestral ===
- Forest (1936)
- Drysdale Overture (1937)
- Festival Overture (1939)
- Overture Aotearoa (1940)
- Landfall in Unknown Seas (1942)
- A Song of Islands (1946)
- Journey for Three (1948)
- This is New Zealand (1949)
- Symphony No. 1 (1949)
- Symphony No. 2 (1951)
- Suite for Orchestra (1955)
- A Birthday Offering (1956)
- Processional Fanfare (1960)
- Symphony No. 3 (1961)

=== Choral ===
- Prodigal Country (1939), for baritone, choir and orchestra

=== Chamber ===
- Three Canzonettas for Violin and Viola (1942-1958)
- Violin Sonata in C (1943)
- Violin Sonata in E♭ (1943)
- String Trio (1945)
- String Quartet in E minor (1946)
- Clarinet Sonatina (1948)
- Violin Sonata (1950)
- Wind Quintet (1957)
- Brass Quartet (1957)

=== Keyboard ===
- Piano Sonata in C minor (1932)
- Piano Sonata in G minor (1937)
- Piano Sonata in A minor (1939)
- Piano Sonata in F♯ minor (1939)
- Five Bagatelles (1942)
- Piano Sonatina No. 1 (1946)
- Piano Sonata (1949)
- Piano Sonata (1956)
- Four Preludes (1960)
- Piano Sonatina No. 2 (1962)
- Nine Short Pieces for Piano (1965)
- Eighteen Short Pieces (1965)
- Five Serial Pieces (1965)

== Awards ==
=== New Zealand Music Hall of Fame ===
The New Zealand Music Hall of Fame was created in 2007 by Recorded Music NZ (then known as the Recording Industry Association of New Zealand (RIANZ)) and the Australasian Performing Right Association (APRA).

Year	Nominee / work	Award	Result	Ref.
2014	Douglas Lilburn	New Zealand Music Hall of Fame — APRA Silver Scrolls Inductee	inductee	

== Bibliography ==
- Norman, Philip (2010). "Lilburn, Douglas Gordon". Dictionary of New Zealand Biography. Te Manatū Taonga / Ministry for Culture and Heritage – via Te Ara: The Encyclopedia of New Zealand.
- Thomson, J. (1995). "Lilburn, Douglas". The New Grove Dictionary of Music and Musicians. Macmillan Publishers. pp. 857–858. doi:10.1093/gmo/9781561592630.article.16648. ISBN 1-56159-174-2 – via Grove Music Online.
