= Charles Brasch =

New Zealand poet, literary editor and arts patron

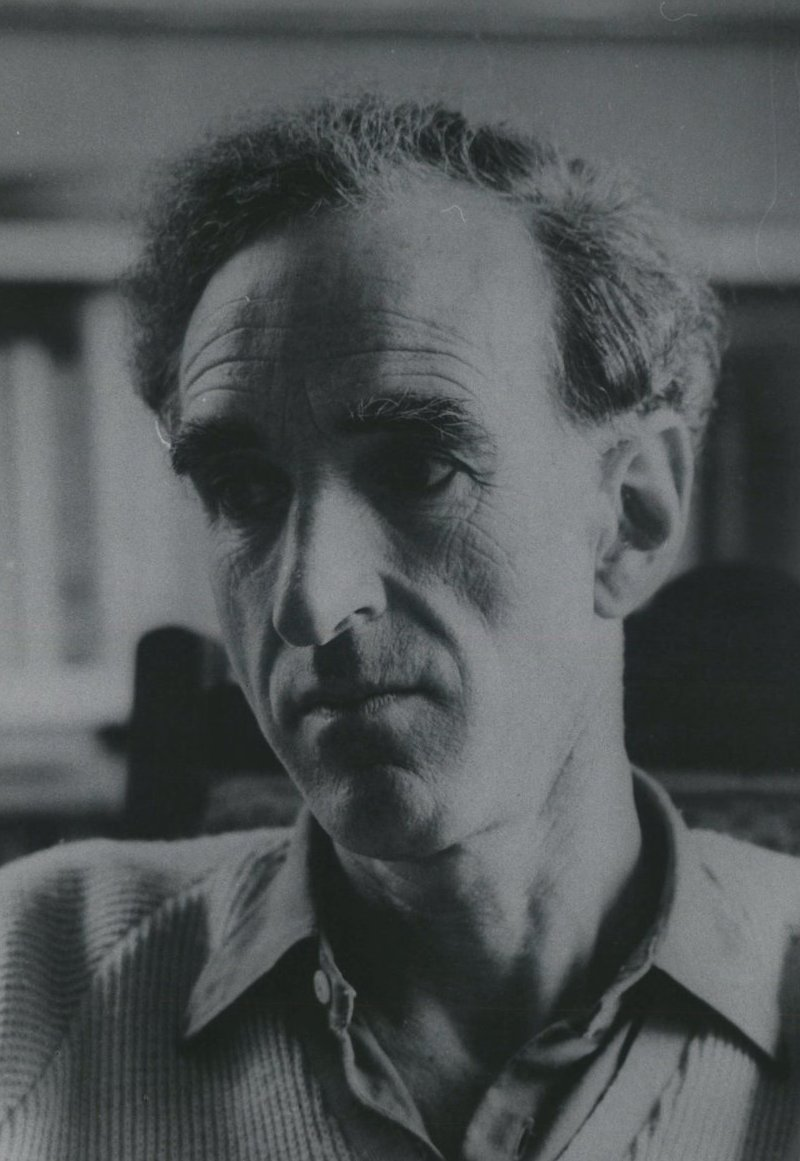
- Brasch, c. 1960
- Born: Charles Orwell Brasch; 27 July 1909; Dunedin, New Zealand
- Died: 20 May 1973 (aged 63); Dunedin, New Zealand
- Education: St John's College, Oxford University
- Occupations: Poet; literary editor; arts patron
- Writing career
- Language: New Zealand English
- Period: 1932–1973

Charles Orwell Brasch (27 July 1909 – 20 May 1973) was a New Zealand poet, literary editor and arts patron. He was the founding editor of the literary journal Landfall, and through his 20 years of editing the journal, had a significant impact on the development of a literary and artistic culture in New Zealand. His poetry continues to be published in anthologies today, and he provided substantial philanthropic support to the arts in New Zealand, including by establishing the Robert Burns Fellowship, the Frances Hodgkins Fellowship and the Mozart Fellowship at the University of Otago, by providing financial support to New Zealand writers and artists during his lifetime, and by bequeathing his extensive collection of books and artwork in his will to the Hocken Library and the University of Otago.

== Early life and education ==
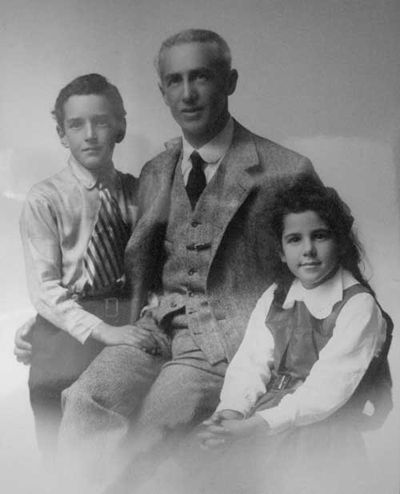
Brasch with his father, Hyam (Henry), and sister Lesley, c. 1920

Brasch was born in Dunedin in 1910. He was the first and only son of Helene Fels, a member of the prominent Hallenstein family of clothing merchants through her mother, and her husband Hyam Brasch, a lawyer who later changed his name to Henry Brash. His younger sister Lesley was born in 1911. In 1914, when Brasch was aged four, his mother died suddenly during her third pregnancy; he was later to describe this event as the end of his childhood. He grew up in Dunedin and spent much time at Manono, the house of his mother's father, Willi Fels, who instilled in him a lifelong love of European culture and artworks, and later supported his career in the arts. By contrast, his relationship with his father was not affectionate, and Brasch was to write in later years: "I had had no father, and he no son." He was plagued by asthma and bronchitis throughout his childhood, until his teenage years.

In 1923 he was sent as a boarder to Waitaki Boys' High School. He began writing poetry during his time there and had some success publishing poems in the school magazine. He also began lifelong friendships with James Bertram, later to become a notable literary figure in his own right, and Ian Milner, the son of the school's principal, Frank Milner. Brasch's father tried to discourage his interest in poetry, wishing his only son to enter the commercial world, rather than become a scholar, but was unsuccessful. In 1927 Brasch was sent by his father to St John's College, Oxford, where he gained an "ignominious third" in Modern History (to his father's disappointment). His contemporaries at Oxford included W. H. Auden and Cecil Day-Lewis, and he had some poetry published in student magazines. He was unofficially tutored by his mother's cousin Esmond de Beer, who had lived in London since childhood, and who along with his sisters introduced Brasch to a love of fine art that would last the rest of his life.

== England, Egypt, and travel ==
After Oxford, Brasch returned to Dunedin in 1931, and worked at his mother's family business Hallensteins for most of that year. During this time he met with Bertram and Milner and helped them plan and prepare a new literary journal, Phoenix, which was to be the first literary journal in New Zealand; although he was never a formal editor, he assisted them with preparing much of the first issue, and contributed work to all but the final issue. After finding that working in the family firm did not suit him, and after what was described by James Bertram as a "bitter showdown" with his father, he returned to England in 1932.

Brasch's friendship with Colin Roberts led him to an interest in archaeology, and in 1932 he went to Egypt for an expedition led by John Pendlebury at Amarna, in the Nile Valley. He would return for two further seasons, and between trips lived in London and studied Arabic and Egyptian history at the School of Oriental Studies. Although he did not pursue an archaeological career, Egypt was to have a lasting influence on his writing. Brasch also began writing serious poetry during this time, exploring issues of European settlement in New Zealand, which was published in New Zealand journals such as Phoenix and Tomorrow.

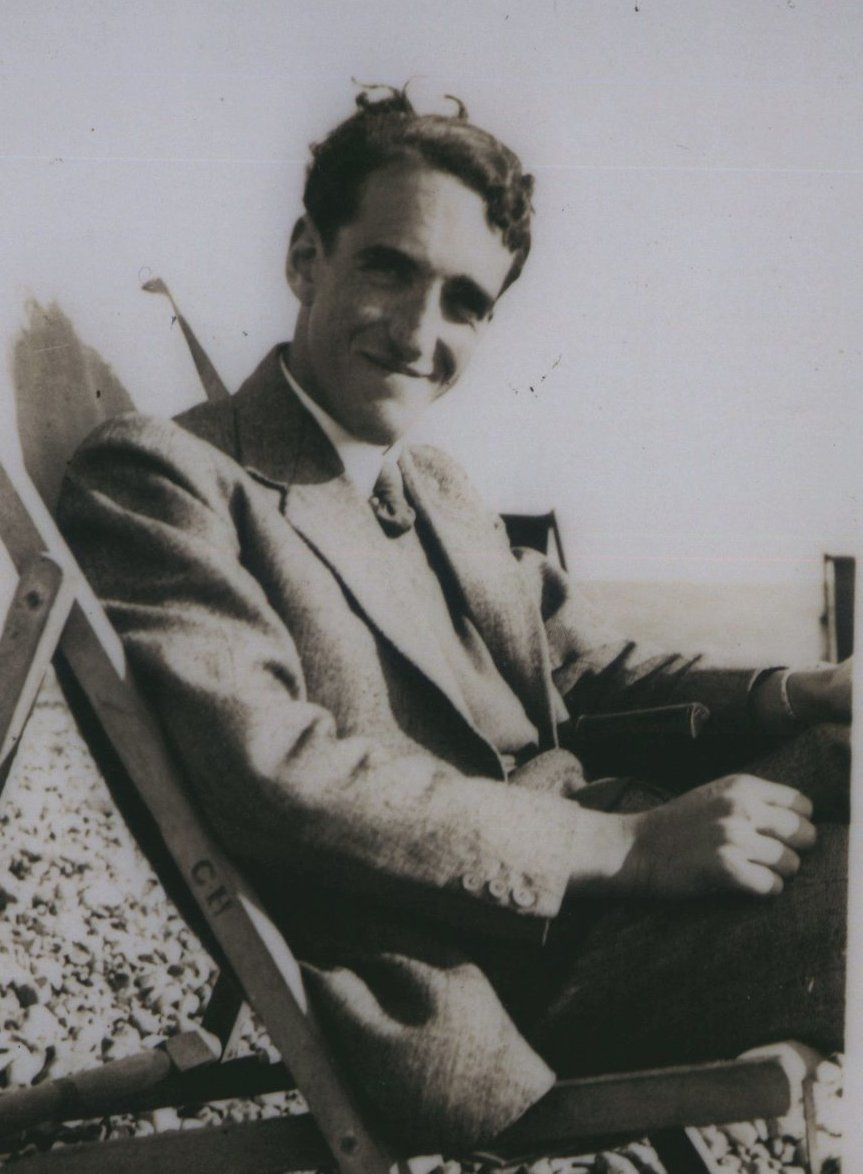
Brasch as a young adult

Brasch was able to travel widely due to financial support from his maternal grandfather. On trips back to New Zealand he met influential New Zealand writers including Denis Glover, Ursula Bethell and Leo Bensemann. In the late 1930s he spent time in Italy, France, Germany, Greece, Palestine and Russia, and travelled by rail with Ian Milner east across America. In 1936, his sister Lesley became ill and he took her to Little Missenden in the Chiltern Hills, where from early 1937 he taught at an experimental school for "problem children". Lesley died in early 1939. In the same year, Brasch had his first collection of poems published by Caxton Press in Christchurch: The Land and the People. The title poem was the strongest in the collection, and considered the identity of the European coloniser in New Zealand, where "the newcomer heart ... moves gauchely still, half alien".

== World War II ==
When World War II broke out, Brasch was travelling to New Zealand with his father after his younger sister's funeral. He decided to return to England, on the basis that having "enjoyed and loved the best of England", he "must not now refuse the worst". He registered for military service, but was rejected because of slight emphysemia and was instead employed as a firewatcher until June 1941. Through his friend Colin Roberts, he obtained a job with the Foreign Office at the intelligence centre at Bletchley Park in June 1941. Brasch worked in the Italian section in the redbrick Elmers School building; he learnt Romanian and his position was described as Head of Romanian and Italian. His salary increased over the war from £350 to £450 plus a £60 war bonus. He later described Bletchley Park as Kafkaesque, with no one willing to make decisions; he and his colleagues could not get an old unsafe stove replaced until it had set the room on fire. He shared lodgings with Roberts at the nearby village of Soulbury.

During the war, Brasch's writing and poetry matured. He wrote mainly about New Zealand, despite living in England. He later said: "It was New Zealand I discovered, not England, because New Zealand lived in me as no other country could live, part of myself as I was part of it, the world I breathed and wore from birth, my seeing and my language". His poetry during the war years was printed in New Writing, and later in his second collection of poetry, Disputed Ground (1948). The title poem of Disputed Ground was dedicated to his friend Roberts.

In March 1942 the unit moved to the Diplomatic Building in Berkeley Street, London. Brasch moved into Lawn Road Flats, and Denis Glover stayed with him when on leave from the Navy. At one point when Glover was at home on leave, they "discussed the idea for a new, professionally produced literary journal in New Zealand". Other periodicals in existence at that time were smaller and irregularly published, and Phoenix had only lasted four issues. In 1945, Allen Curnow chose 11 of Brasch's early poems for an anthology, A Book of New Zealand Verse 1923–45. Brasch wrote in his journal that although he did not like all the poems that Curnow had chosen, the fact of his inclusion gave him "a great sense of support, of being established, having arrived".

== Landfall ==
When Brasch resigned from the Foreign Office after the war, he returned to New Zealand, settling in Dunedin permanently. In an interview with Milner in 1971, he said he knew he had to return as the war went on; "I did not fully understand what [New Zealand] meant to me until I feared to lose it for ever when France fell and the bombing of London started." He had held the ambition of publishing "a substantial literary journal" in New Zealand for at least 15 years, since Phoenix, and in 1947 he founded Landfall, remaining the editor for the next 20 years.

Landfall was New Zealand's leading literary journal during Brasch's editorship, and significantly important to New Zealand's emerging literary culture in the 1950s and 1960s. The journal's character and importance reflected Brasch's efforts; given his independent family wealth, he was able to devote himself to editing the journal on a full-time basis, and applied high and exacting standards to the publication and the work published in it. At times, Brasch's high standards for the journal led to friction, with some young writers resenting what they saw as his inflexibility and solemnity, and calling the journal elitist. He did, however, encourage and promote the work of new writers in whom he saw promise.

Brasch ensured that the journal not only published poems, short stories and reviews, but also published paintings, photographs and other visual art, and provided commentary on the arts, theatre, music, architecture, and aspects of public affairs. His vision for the journal was that it would be "distinctly of New Zealand without being parochial", and he viewed the likely audience as the educated public: "Everyone for whom literature and the arts are a necessity of life." Virtually all prominent writers in New Zealand at that time were published in Landfall; Janet Frame wrote in her autobiography An Angel At My Table that her early impression of the magazine was that "if you didn't appear in Landfall then you could scarcely call yourself a writer".

In 1962, Brasch published Landfall Country: Work from Landfall, 1947–61, an anthology of works published in Landfall. Writers and poets featured included Maurice Gee, Frank Sargeson, C.K. Stead, Ruth Dallas, Allen Curnow, James K. Baxter and Fleur Adcock, and there were reproductions of paintings, sculptures and photographs by various New Zealand artists including Colin McCahon, Evelyn Page and others. It also included twenty-nine pages of selections from the editorial section written by Brasch himself.

== Later life ==
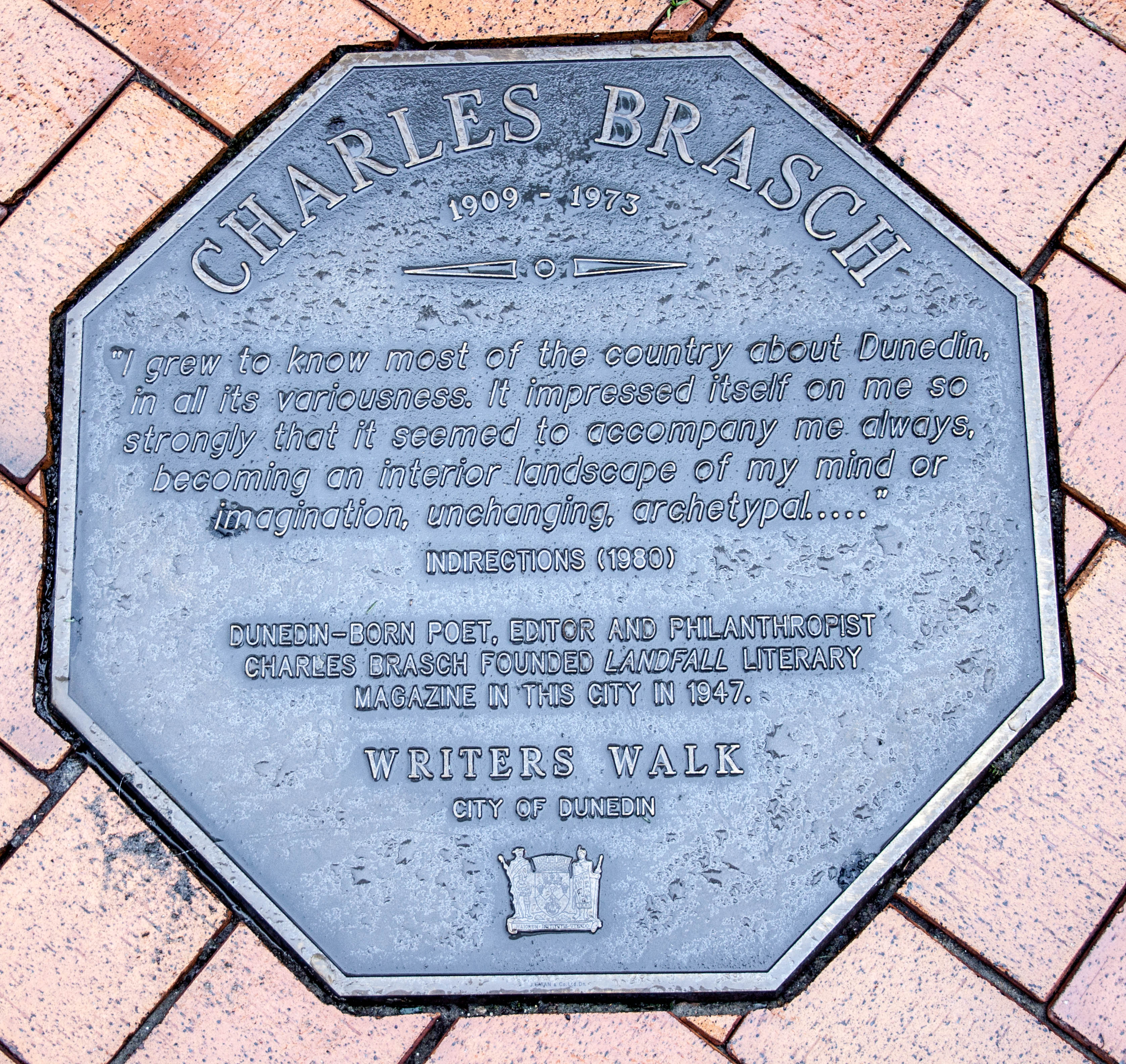
Memorial plaque dedicated to Brasch in Dunedin, on the Writers' Walk on the Octagon

In later life Brasch was a substantial patron of arts and literature in New Zealand, usually quietly and anonymously. He established the Roberts Burns Fellowship, the Frances Hodgkins Fellowship and Mozart Fellowship at the University of Otago, together with his cousins Esmond, Dora and Mary de Beer. He was also a patron and contributor to the Otago Museum; in this regard he followed in the footsteps of his maternal grandfather, Willi Fels. Egyptian artifacts he collected can be seen at the Museum. He also anonymously supported many New Zealand writers, including Frame, Sargeson and Baxter, and championed and supported artists including McCahon, Rita Angus, Toss Woollaston and many others. In May 1963 he was awarded an honorary doctorate by the University of Otago to recognise his contributions to New Zealand culture as an editor, arts patron and poet.

He continued to write poetry, publishing The Estate and Other Poems in 1957 and Ambulando in 1964. The title sequence of The Estate was dedicated to Harry Scott, the husband of Brasch's friend Margaret Scott. Brasch had felt unrequited love for Harry Scott for many years, and was devastated by his accidental death in 1960. Brasch's works were almost exclusively published in New Zealand and continued to focus on New Zealand identity. After retiring from Landfall in 1966, Brasch published his fifth and largest collection of poetry, Not Far Off (1969). Other occupations included the translation of works by Amrita Pritam, a brief foray into publishing with his friend Janet Paul, serving on organisations such as the Dunedin Public Library Association, the Otago Museum management committee, the Hocken Library Committee, and giving guest lectures at universities throughout New Zealand.

== Death and legacy ==
Brasch became ill with cancer in mid-1972, and before his death was looked after at home by Margaret Scott and another friend Ruth Dallas. He died in May 1973. His ashes were scattered, in accordance with a direction in his will, at a "high and windy place" in New Zealand's South Island hills.

Brasch bequeathed his significant library, which reflected his interest in literature, art, history and religion, to the University of Otago Library, which named its Charles Brasch Room in his memory. The wide and eclectic nature of his reading allowed him to achieve his own substantial output. His archives are housed at the Hocken Collections, where over 450 artworks gifted by him can also be seen. In 2013, this collection was included as an entry on the UNESCO Memory of the World Aotearoa New Zealand Ngā Mahara o te Ao register. Brasch bequeathed his house at Broad Bay to Anna Caselberg and her husband John Caselberg, both New Zealand artists and members of The Group, and after their deaths in 2004 the house became an artist's retreat.

A sixth collection of poems, Home Ground, was published after his death in 1974. Unlike his earlier work, his final poems dealt more with personal concerns and feelings than with broader issues of national identity. Since his death, many of his poems have been anthologised and appeared in collected editions. In July 1976, O. E. Middleton and John Caselberg organised a three-day Charles Brasch Arts Festival in Dunedin as a tribute to him. His uncompleted autobiography, Indirections, which covered his early years up until 1947, was published in 1980 and edited by his friend Bertram. It received third place at the Goodman Fielder Wattie Book Awards.

When gifting his journals and personal papers to the Hocken Library, Brasch did so on the condition that they be embargoed for thirty years after his death, to avoid embarrassing his friends. When the embargo was lifted in 2003, Enduring Legacy: Charles Brasch, patron, poet, collector was published to celebrate his life and legacy. It was illustrated by photographs and by colour reproductions of works from his extensive art collection. In 2007, Margaret Scott edited and wrote the introduction to Charles Brasch in Egypt, Brasch's account of his time in Egypt. She also began work on transcribing the journals before her own death in 2014, and said that she found it painful to read of Brasch's unhappiness and his inability to accept his sexuality. Brasch's journals were published in a three volume series between 2013 and 2018.

In 2015, the Otago University Press published a collection of Brasch's Selected Poems, chosen and edited by his friend and literary executor Alan Roddick. Lawrence Jones in the Otago Daily Times wrote that the collection "offers the reader in an expertly and sympathetically edited, beautifully designed and printed book of 150 pages the opportunity to experience Brasch's poetic journey": "Such poems, although written in currently unfashionable modes, when they are read in their own terms remain alive and relevant as the testament to the poetic development of a reserved man of great integrity and insight, one of the makers of a New Zealand high culture".

== Personal life ==
Brasch's sexual orientation was an open secret within the New Zealand literary community. Authors Peter Wells and Rex Pilgrim attempted to include a poem by Brasch in the 1997 anthology Best Mates: Gay Writing in Aotearoa New Zealand but were not able to secure permission, instead including a blank page labelled with Brasch's name. Brasch has been described as bisexual by biographer Peter Simpson. Portions of Brasch's autobiographic writings relating to his romantic life were published in Charles Brasch Journals 1945–1957 (2017).

In the 1940s while returning home from England to New Zealand, Brasch unsuccessfully proposed to Rose Archdall, a widow whom he met on the SS Themistocles.

== Selected works ==
=== Poetry ===
- The Land and the People, and Other Poems (1939), Caxton Press
- Disputed Ground (1948), Caxton Press
- The Estate (1957), Caxton Press
- Ambulando (1964), Caxton Press
- Home Ground (1974), Caxton Press
- Collected Poems (1984), Oxford University Press
- Selected Poems (2015), Otago University Press

=== Other ===
- The Quest: Words for a Mime Play (1946), London: The Compass Players
- Present Company: Reflections on the Arts (1966), Auckland: Blackwood and Janet Paul for the Auckland Gallery Associates
- Such Separate Creatures: Stories (1973), Christchurch: Caxton Press
- Hallensteins: the First Century, 1873–1973 (1973), Dunedin : Hallenstein Bros., 1973. (with C.R. Nicholson)
- Brasch, Charles (1980). Indirections: A Memoir 1909–1947. Wellington, New Zealand: Oxford University Press. ISBN 0-19-558050-8.
- The Universal Dance: a Selection from the Critical Prose Writings of Charles Brasch (1981), Dunedin: University of Otago Press
- Brasch, Charles (6 February 2024). Journals 1938–1945 (Volume 1). Dunedin, New Zealand: Otago University Press. ISBN 978-1-877372-84-1.
- Brasch, Charles (2017). Journals 1945-1957 (Volume 2). Dunedin, New Zealand: Otago University Press. ISBN 978-09-47522469.
- Brasch, Charles (2018). Journals 1958-1973 (Volume 3). Dunedin, New Zealand: Otago University Press. ISBN 978-1-98-853114-4.
