= Ruth Dallas =

New Zealand writer (1919–2008)

Ruth Dallas CBE
- Born: Ruth Minnie Mumford; 29 September 1919; Invercargill, New Zealand
- Died: 18 March 2008 (aged 88); Dunedin, New Zealand
- Education: Southland Technical College
- Writing career
- Genre: Poetry
- Notable awards: Robert Burns Fellowship

Ruth Minnie Mumford CBE (29 September 1919 – 18 March 2008), better known by her pen name Ruth Dallas, was a New Zealand poet and children's author.

== Biography ==
Dallas was born in Invercargill, the daughter of Frank and Minnie Mumford. She became blind in one eye at 15, then spent three years at the Southland Technical College and was engaged at 19. But her fiancé broke off the engagement to serve in Great Britain during World War II. During the war she worked at an army office and as a milk tester. Following the war, in 1946, her first published poem, "Morning Mountains" appeared in The Southland Times. She adopted her maternal grandmother's name, Dallas, as a pen name. Her first book of poetry, Country Road and Other Poems, was published in 1953. In 1954 she moved to Dunedin, where she lived for most of her life.

In her autobiography, she explains that during her upbringing no person or milieu would have encouraged her to write poetry: 'I am at a loss to account for the fact that I wrote poetry in an environment where I knew no one who was interested in poetry.' Nevertheless, her poetry is said to be influenced by William Wordsworth (and later in life by shorter Chinese poetry) and focuses upon southern New Zealand landscape. Two of her most notable pieces of poetry, "Photographs of Pioneer Women" and "Pioneer Woman with Ferrets" were both written to show the inequality and sexist stereotypes of the time and to also give these pioneer women a voice. She was awarded the 1968 Robert Burns Fellowship by the University of Otago, which she used to launch a series of children's books, beginning with The Children in the Bush. In 1977, she was a joint winner of the New Zealand Book Award for Poetry for her collection Walking on the Snow; that same year she received for Song for a Guitar and Other Songs the Buckland Literary Award, for "the Literary Work for the year of the highest Literary Merit". In 1978 the University of Otago made her an honorary Doctor of Literature. Later, as her eyesight deteriorated, she received A Blind Achievers' Award. In the 1989 Queen's Birthday Honours, she was appointed a Commander of the Order of the British Empire, for services to literature.

Dallas died in 2008 in hospital in Dunedin after a fall in her home. Her ashes were buried in Andersons Bay Cemetery.

== Bibliography ==
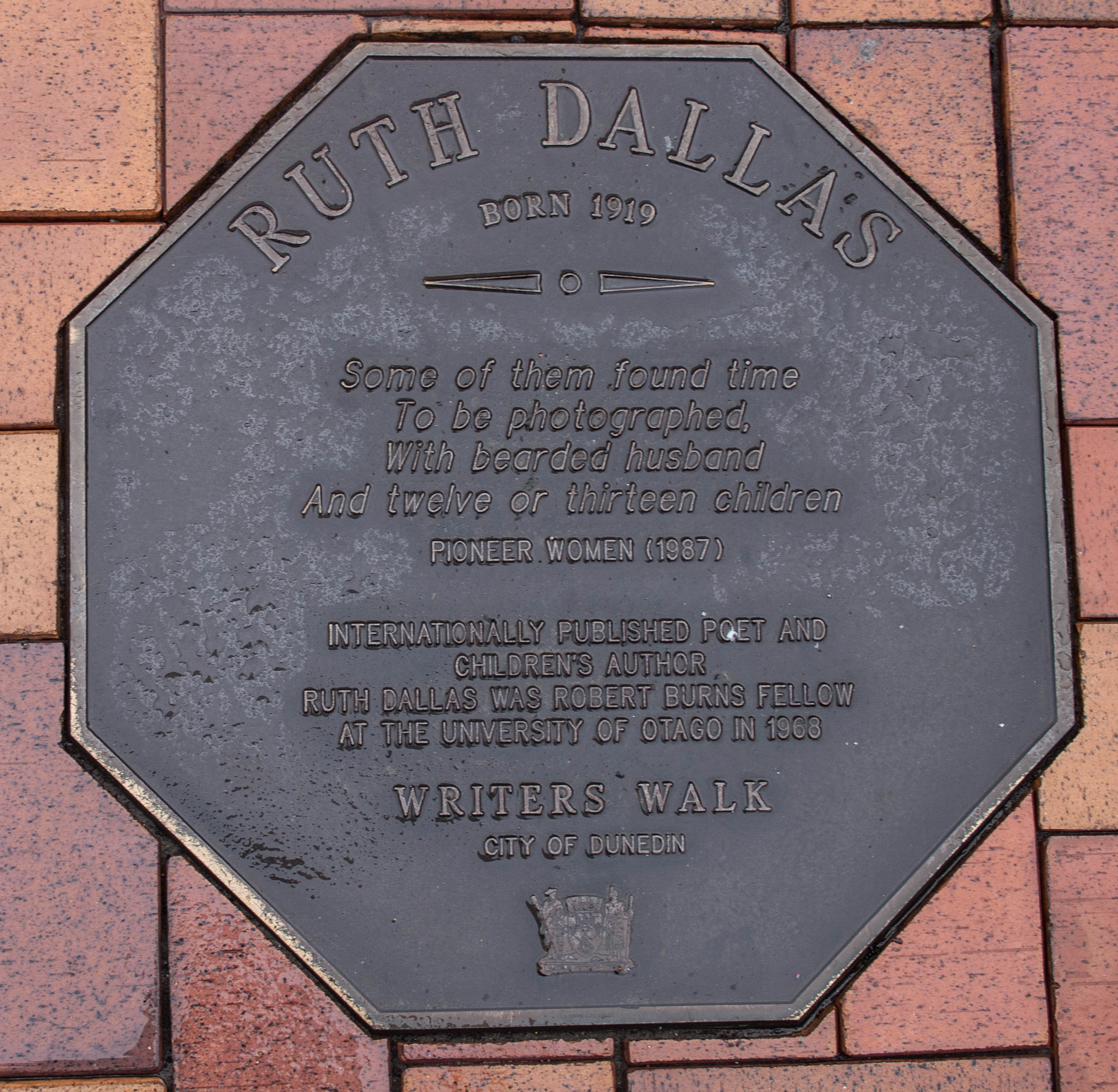
Memorial plaque dedicated to Ruth Dallas in Dunedin, on the Writers' Walk on the Octagon

=== Poetry ===
- Country Road and Other Poems 1947-52 (Caxton Press, 1953)
- The Turning Wheel (Caxton Press, 1961)
- Experiment in Form (Press Room, University of Otago, 1964)
- Day Book: Poems of a Year (Caxton Press, 1966)
- Shadow Show (Caxton Press, 1968)
- Walking on the Snow (Caxton Press, 1976)
- Song for a Guitar and Other Songs (Otago University Press, 1976)
- Steps of the Sun (Caxton Press, 1979)
- Collected Poems (Otago University Press, 1987; 2nd ed. 2000)
- The Joy of a Ming Vase (Otago University Press, 2006)

=== Children's literature ===
- Ragamuffin Scarecrow (Bibliography Room, University of Otago, 1969)
- The Children in the Bush (Methuen, 1969)
- A Dog Called Wig (Methuen, 1970)
- The Wild Boy in the Bush (Methuen, 1971)
- The Big Flood in the Bush (Methuen, 1972)
- The House on the Cliffs (Methuen, 1975)
- Shining Rivers (Methuen, 1979)
- Holiday Time in the Bush (Methuen, 1983)

=== Short stories ===
- The Black Horse and Other Stories (Otago University Press, 2000)

=== Memoir ===
- Curved Horizon: An Autobiography (Otago University Press, 1991)
