= Parehuia Artist Residency (McCahon House) =

McCahon House Artist in Residence Programme
- Named after: Colin McCahon and Anne McCahon
- Established: 2006
- Founded at: Titirangi, West Auckland, New Zealand
- Professional title: Parehuia Artist Residency

The Parehuia Artist Residency or McCahon House Artist in Residence programme was established in 2006 with their first participants, Judy Millar and Andrew McLeod and is a residency for both domestic and international artists in Titirangi, West Auckland, New Zealand. In 2006, New Zealand Prime Minister Helen Clark identified McCahon House 'as a significant part of New Zealand’s cultural heritage,' and key to the McCahon House project.

== History of McCahon house ==
Colin and Anne McCahon moved to Auckland in 1953 from the South Island due to a temporary, and later permanent, job opportunity for Colin at Auckland Art Gallery. The couple's financial situation led them to purchase 67 Otitori Bay Road in Titirangi because of its affordable price. The original property consisted of a small bach with an outdoor toilet at the base of a steep path, surrounded by bush. However they later added a downstairs bathroom and wooden bunks under the deck for their children to sleep on. The property's garage still sits atop the hill and was originally one of Colin's painting spaces. The home specifically suited Colin's lifestyle of hybrid work in the city, and building and gardening at home.

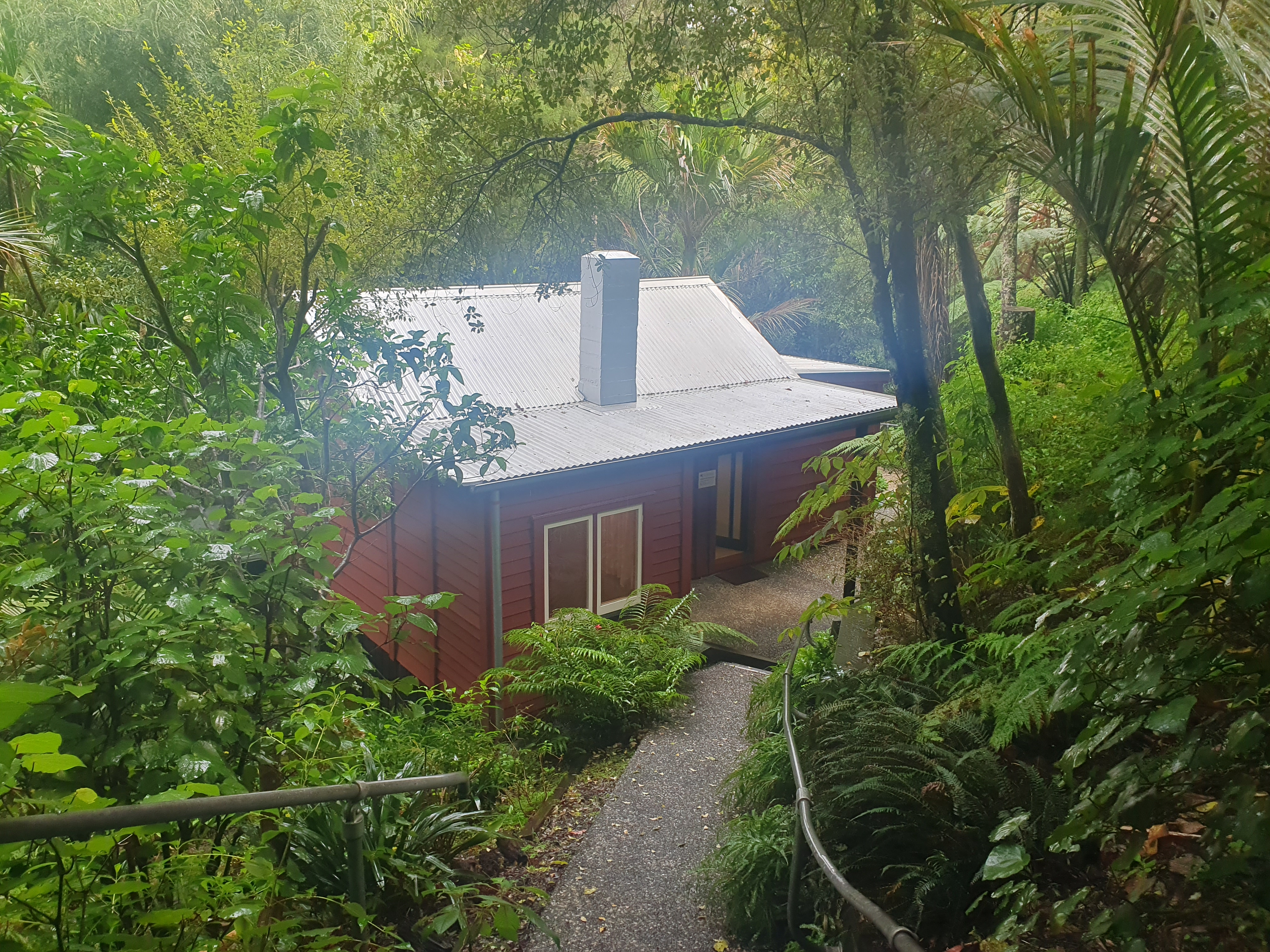
McCahon House Museum

However they would often return home in darkness due to no street lights near their home. The family also didn't have a car to assist in travels, leaving them the option of a thirty minute trip to Titirangi village for essentials. Anne cooked and sewed for them and their four children. There are also accounts of friends visiting them such as Charles Brasch, John Caselberg, and Pat Hanly. They reportedly lived in the house for at least seven years.

=== The property now (2006- ) ===
Since 2006 the house has been a museum commemorating the McCahon family run by the McCahon House Trust with interactive compartments and treasures hidden for visitors to find like photos, letters, and context panels. The garage houses chairs and screens a McCahon film. Records show that the museum has been run by Diane Blomfield.

Through assistance from Waitakere City Council, Lopdell House Gallery, McCahon French Bay House Trust, SkyCity, ASB, Portage, Auckland Regional Services Trusts, the Ministry of Tourism, and the Lottery Grants Board, the McCahon House Museum and artist residency programme became realities. The artist residency studio was built on the left side of the property and includes a living room, two bedrooms and bathrooms. Bossley Architects and McCahon House Trust collaborated to design the artist residence, which later won the NZ Institute of Architects New Zealand Award 2008, Local Award 2007, and Colour Award 2007. The building's design incorporates the surrounding kauri trees, which were often subject matter in Colin McCahon's paintings.

== Artists in residence—past and present ==
The artist residency programme leads on from Colin McCahon's teaching experience, including at Elam School of Fine Arts. It was named the Parehuia residency in 2008 by local kaumatua Eru Thompson. Artists in residence have the opportunity to focus on their practice, build a community and establish connections.

- 2006: First resident Judy Millar, Andrew McLeod
- 2012: Regan Gentry
- 2013 - 2014: Tiffany Singh, Amy Howden-Chapman
- 2015: Campbell Patterson, Suji Park, Daniel Malone
- 2016 - 2017: Imogen Taylor, Sarah Smuts-Kennedy, Oliver Perkins
- 2018: Emma Fitts
- 2020: Steve Carr, Ana Iti, Richard Frater
- 2021: Emily Karaka, Moniek Schrijer, Cora-Allan Wickliffe
- 2022: Ayesha Green
- 2023: Richard Lewer
- 2025: Rowan Panther, Sefton Rani
- 2026: Conor Clarke, Linda Va'aelua, Zena Elliot

=== Date unknown ===
- Bill Hammond
- Fatu Feu'u
- Elizabeth Thomson
- Gregor Kregar
- Sara Hughes
- André Hemer
- James Robinson
- Gavin Hipkins
- Rohan Wealleans
- Luise Fong
- Eve Armstrong
- Lisa Reihana
- Ava Seymour
- Martin Basher
- Andy Leleisi'uao
- Jim Speers
- Liyen Chong
- Glen Hayward
- Bepen Bhana
- Fiona Pardington
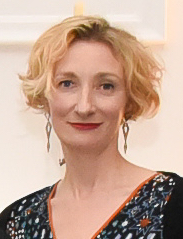
Eve Armstrong, resident artist

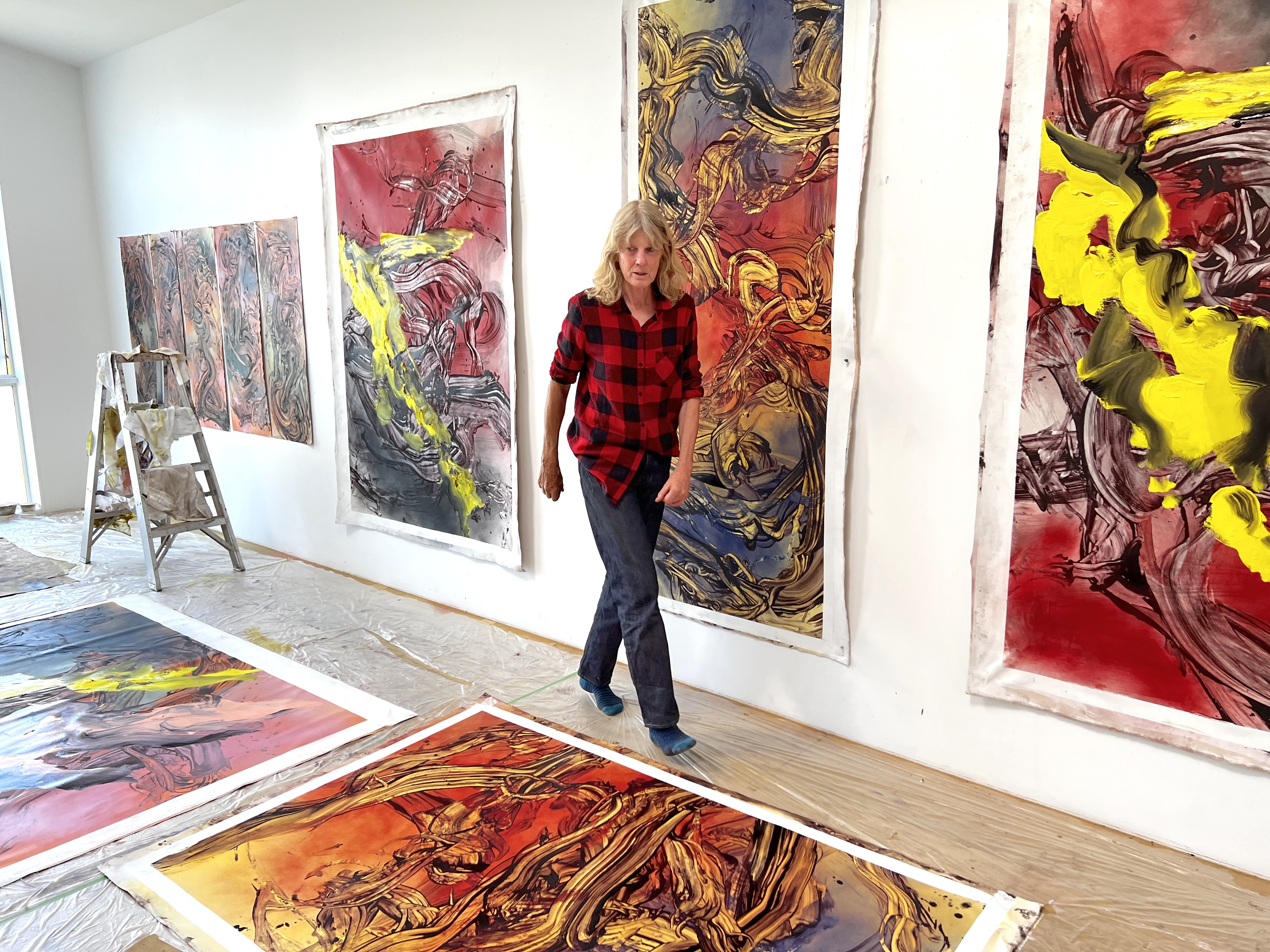
Judy Millar, first Parehuia artist in residence in 2006

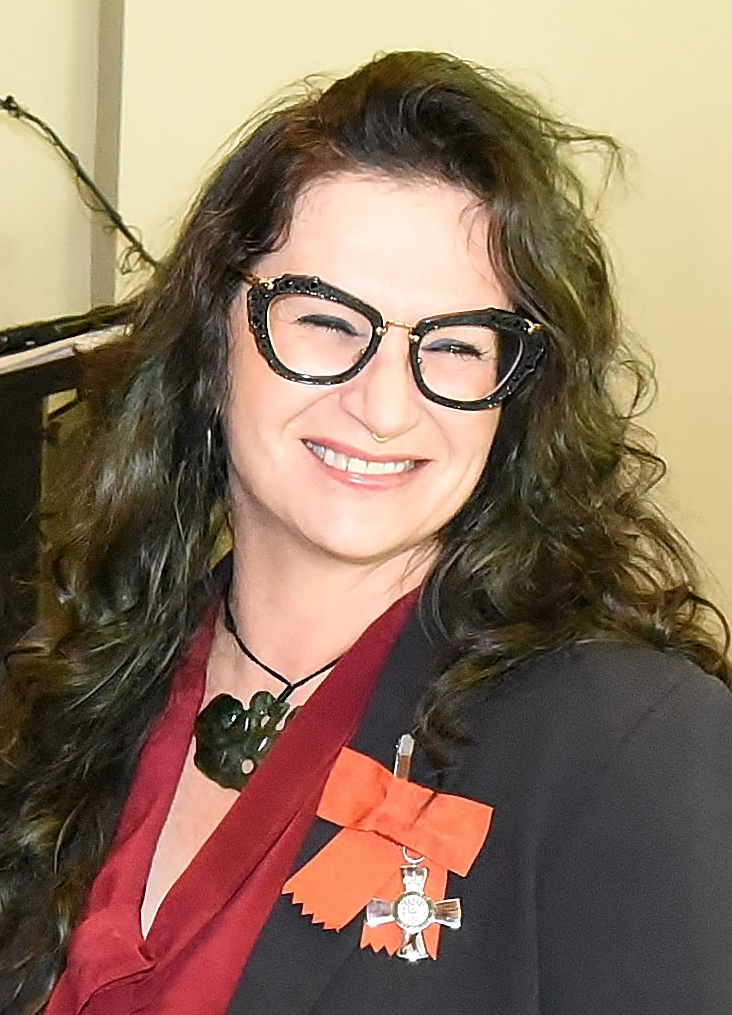
Fiona Pardington, resident artist

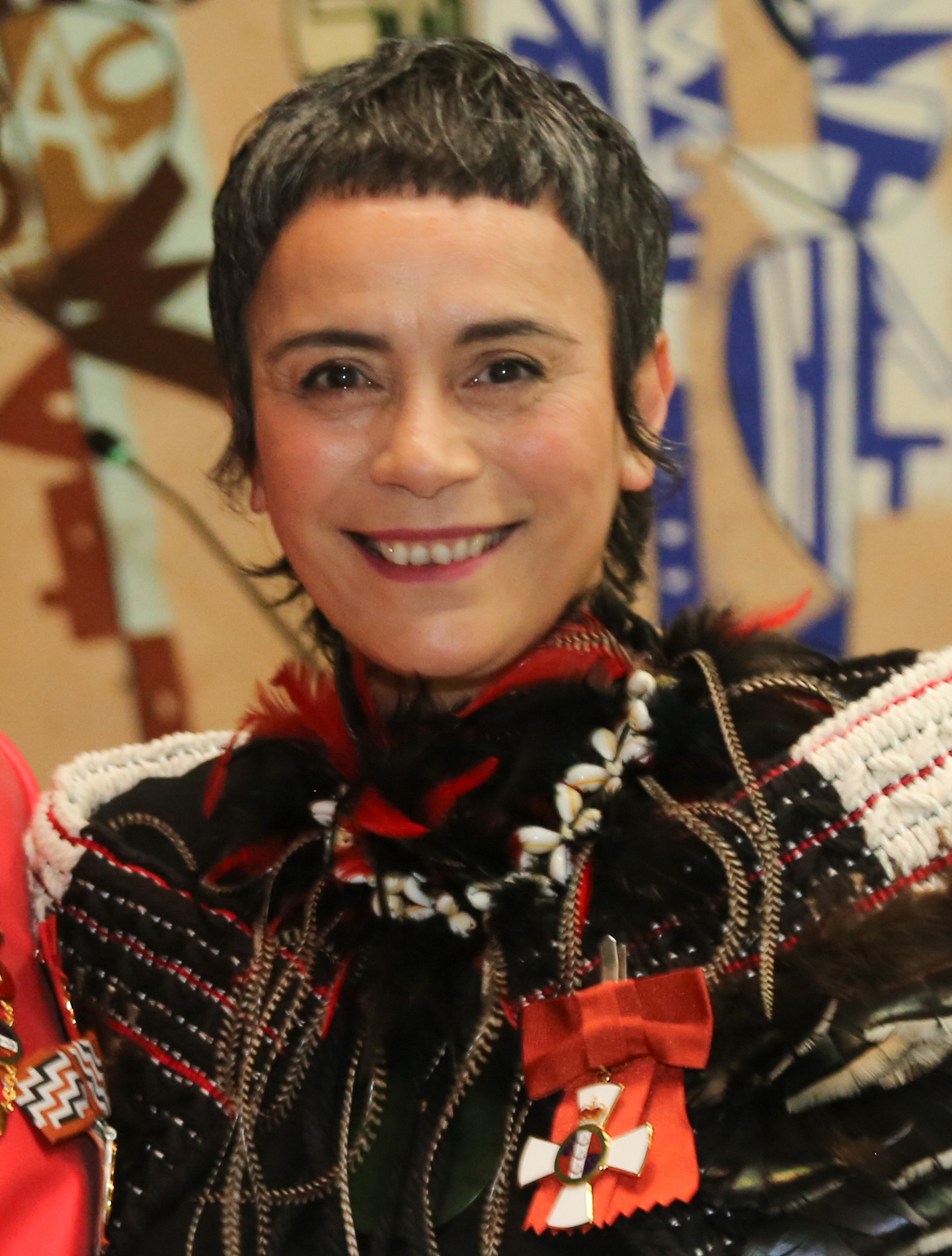
Lisa Reihana, resident artist

== Subsequent exhibitions ==
Date	Title	Artists	Location	Source
August 2006	Colin McCahon – The Titirangi Years – 1953-1959	Colin McCahon	Lopdell House Gallery	
8 Dec - 12 Feb 2012	Tree House: McCahon House Residency Five Years On	Judy Millar, Andrew McLeod, James Robinson, Gavin Hipkins, Rohan Wealleans, Richard Lewer, Luise Fong, Eve Armstrong, Lisa Reihana, Ava Seymour, Martin Basher, Andy Leleisi’uao, Jim Speers, Liyen Chong, and Glen Hayward	Te Uru Contemporary Gallery	
2016 - 2017	"A Table of One's Own: The Creative Life of Anne McCahon"	Anne McCahon	Te Uru Contemporary Gallery	
