= Anne Hamblett =

New Zealand artist

- Born: 11 October 1915; Mosgiel, Otago, New Zealand
- Died: 30 December 1993 (aged 78); Auckland, Auckland Region, New Zealand
- Known for: Painter
- Movement: Modernism
- Spouse: Colin McCahon (1919–1987)

Annie (Anne) Eleanor McCahon née Hamblett (11 October 1915 – 30 December 1993) was a New Zealand artist and illustrator. She was married to fellow artist Colin McCahon.

== Early life ==
Anne Hamblett was born in Mosgiel, the daughter of the Reverend W. A. Hamblett and Ellen Hamblett (née West). She attended Otago Girls' High School in Dunedin and then studied at King Edward Technical College from 1934 to 1937. In her second year she was awarded a Callander Scholarship. Her fellow students included Toss Woollaston, Rodney Kennedy, Doris Lusk, Len Castle, and Colin McCahon. Some of them, including Lusk, Woollaston and McCahon, would often make painting excursions into the countryside, cementing life-long friendships. Dunedin at the time was the centre for art in New Zealand, with Woollaston describing it as, "the most artistically enlightened place in New Zealand. A city that was looking at artists unheard of in Christchurch – Matisse, Picasso, Cézanne." He added that "the one quality that united all these painters was excitement." In part this was thanks to a group of teachers who had arrived in New Zealand from the United Kingdom thanks to the La Trobe Scheme. They included R. N. Field, J. D. Charlton Edgar and Gordon Tovey, who was the Technical College’s Director. In 1938, Hamblett was enrolled as an art major at the Dunedin Training College, where Ivy Copeland was lecturer in art.

== Early work ==
Hamblett began exhibiting with the Otago Art Society soon after leaving art school. In 1938, two paintings were exhibited in a group show at the Wellington Sketch Club and described as 'outstanding' by the local newspaper: "Two oils by Anne Hamblett called for considerable attention. A landscape was an interesting study of farms and rolling hills. The picture carried well, colouring and arrangement being very good." Doris Lusk, Mollie Lawn, and Anne Hamblett established a studio and exhibition space above the UFS Dispensary in Princes Street to offer each other support in painting and exhibiting. Hamblett continued to show regularly in the Otago Art Society exhibitions, often with great success. Her 1939 outing resulted in six sales.

== Colin McCahon ==
Hamblett met Colin McCahon when he began studying at the King Edward Technical College in 1937. As art critic Wystan Curnow has noted, "It became customary for a group of young Dunedin painters and intellectuals to gather in summer at Māpua or elsewhere in the Nelson region to earn money picking fruit or tobacco, and to paint, read, listen to music and talk. [As well as] Woollaston, McCahon and Kennedy, the group included Patrick Hayman, Anne Hamblett, Doris Lusk, and Ron and Betty O'Reilly." McCahon recalled meeting up with, "the 'superior and aloof' female students who somehow got away with smoking despite the 'no smoking' ban… later on I married one of the superior girls (first met and seen through a barrier of tobacco smoke and Brahms on a portable gramophone)." In 1939, Hamblett and a number of other artists, including Rodney Kennedy and Doris Lusk, removed their paintings from the annual Otago Art Society show in protest at McCahon's work being removed from the exhibition. After the protest, the McCahon work was reinstated. Hamblett and McCahon grew closer, sharing friends and working on joint projects such as stage sets for a local production of the John Galsworthy comedy Windows with Rodney Kennedy. Art historian Linda Tyler suggests that during the early war years, their closeness began to "manifest itself in their paintings in the form of cross-fertilisation of ideas and style." Tyler also suggested that Hamblett's "intellectual contribution to McCahon lasted all his life" and that in interviews with the family it became clear that he constantly asked for her advice and "respected her eye and her ability to make useful aesthetic criticism of his work." The couple were married by Hamblett's father, the Rev Canon W. A. Hamblett, on 21 September 1942 at St Matthew's Church, Dunedin. Hamblett (hereafter Anne McCahon) was twenty-seven and McCahon was twenty-three. That same year the McCahons moved to Pangatōtara near Motueka. The couple went on to have four children, two daughters and two sons: William, Catherine, Victoria, and Matthew.

== Final exhibitions ==
Anne McCahon continued painting after her marriage, and her work was presented publicly on a number of occasions. These included:

- 1942: in exhibition at the Suter Gallery, Nelson.
- 1943: September 1943's issue of Art in New Zealand included her 1940 portrait of Dunedin personality Sybil Henderson.
- 1944: Anne and Colin McCahon both showed at an Otago Art Society exhibition, and in the same year collaborated on a series of drawings titled Pictures for Children, which was shown at Modern Books in Dunedin and reviewed by Art in New Zealand. This described the works as "the purest fun… lucky children indeed to get these pictures." Writer Martin Edmond later recalled seeing what he assumes was one of the unsold works hanging on his bedroom wall, it having been gifted to his parents.
- 1953: The McCahons worked together on a theatre production of Peer Gynt in Christchurch. Anne McCahon designed the costumes, and some of her drawings from this production are held in the Hocken Collections. Colin McCahon designed the sets.

The frequency of Anne McCahon’s exhibiting slowed as the years went on. While she was still painting in 1946, it is generally agreed that her final known painting was The Park from 1945, a small oil on board featuring trees in a winter landscape.

== Career as an illustrator ==
In 1945 Anne McCahon was invited by writer Peggy Dunningham to illustrate her book for children Three Brown Bears and the Manpower Man. The book was positively reviewed, with Hamblett's illustrations being cited as "excellent". This project was a precursor to a long period of illustrating for the School Journal. This association began in 1951 while McCahon was still living in Christchurch and art for the School Journal was being edited by Roy Cowan. He commissioned Anne McCahon to contribute illustrations such as Timothy Tidy (written by Aileen Findlay), The Obstinate Turnip, and Apple Dumplings Her contributions (in 1955 Anne McCahon had over fifty illustrations published) continued over eight years but virtually ended when Cowan resigned as editor of the Journal.

After a break at the time that the McCahons moved to Auckland in 1953, Anne McCahon resumed illustrating for the School Journal. Her contributions included a number of covers, and continued until 1959, when Cowan stepped down as art editor. McCahon's final project was illustrating the story A Jackal Who Wouldn’t Work.

There are differing views on why Anne McCahon stopped painting and illustrating. While her marriage was not an easy one from the early days of poverty and itinerant living to meeting the demands of four children and a husband with a demanding full-time job and a long commute, most commentators agree with art historian Tony Green that "McCahon was… a lucky man in that he simply could not have achieved what he did without the career-long support of Anne (née Hamblett), his wife and also an artist."

== Life in Auckland ==
The McCahon family moved to Auckland in 1953 once Colin McCahon gained a job at the Auckland City Art Gallery and purchased a house at 67 Otitori Bay Road in Titirangi. The house provided a demanding environment. Artist Shannon Te Ao recalls of his time filming there, "on a rainy day in July… the elements turn against the architecture. It's impossible not to imagine how tough a setting this would have been for Colin, Anne, and their four children." However, the house also provided a place for friends to meet in the weekends and became something of a magnet for many of the leading literary and art figures of the time.

Anne and Colin McCahon continued to share a passion for contemporary art, and when he travelled for four months to the United States to study art museums on behalf of the Auckland Art Gallery, Anne accompanied him. Their itinerary was intense. According to Colin McCahon's report to the Auckland City Council, they visited around 63 art galleries, 100 dealer galleries and private collections and met a number of artists. Gordon H. Brown illustrates Anne McCahon's enthusiasm and insight when he quotes her reflections on a Mark Rothko retrospective: "Well here we were in the thick of it, though while a retrospective exhibition is not likely to be new painting it certainly was to us. Colin was better prepared being the devotee of Art News that he is. Still the reality of a painting is quite different generally from that of a reproduction."

The McCahon family moved to the central Auckland suburb of Grey Lynn in 1960, buying a house at 109 Crummer Road. Between 1978 and 1981, Anne started making ceramics, and had a kiln in the back garden of the family home. By the early 1980s Colin McCahon's health had deteriorated and he needed more support. Anne wrote letters to his dealers on his behalf, and in 1984 accompanied him to the exhibition McCahon I Will Need Words at the Fifth Sydney Biennale. Colin McCahon died three years later.

== Re-evaluation ==
Anne McCahon died in 1993. A decade later, Linda Tyler, Associate Professor of Museums and Cultural Heritage at the University of Auckland, began to drawn attention to her work as Anne Hamblett for the first time since the final exhibition in the 1940s. In 2016, Tyler curated A Table of One's Own: The Creative Life of Anne McCahon at Te Uru Waitākere Contemporary Gallery. The exhibition examined Hamblett’s paintings alongside her illustrations and ceramics. Tyler has also written extensively on Hamblett and her contribution to New Zealand art. As the exhibition’s researcher Jessica Douglas put it, "Despite the meaningful contribution made by Hamblett to Dunedin's regionalism, she has been unrecognised and ignored in New Zealand’s art history."

Further retrospectives and tributes followed. In 2020, Anne Hamblett, Early Works was shown at Michael Lett Gallery in Auckland. The following year, Julia Holderness's Dunedin Public Art Gallery installation The Studio was a response to the studio space shared by Lusk, Lawn, and Hamblett in Dunedin.

Many of Colin and Anne's personal papers were archived by the Hocken Collections. In 2020, these were inscribed on the UNESCO Memory of the World Aotearoa New Zealand Ngā Mahara o te Ao register.

== McCahon House and artists' residency ==
In 1999 the Waitakere City Council acquired the former McCahon family home in Titirangi with the intention of restoring it to its 1959 condition. Work began the same year, and on completion the house was gifted to the McCahon House Trust and opened to the public. In 2006, a new building to serve as a residence and studio for artists was opened next door to the McCahon house. The original house is surrounded by large kauri trees, and is now a small museum dedicated to the McCahon family. The Trust hosts three artists at the house for three months each every year, and to date (as of March 2024) has had 52 artists in residence, with a number of them (including Tiffany Singh, Bepen Bhana, and Fiona Pardington) having made works that relate directly to Anne McCahon's connection with the house.
