= Doris Lusk =

New Zealand painter, potter, art teacher, and university lecturer (1916–1990)

- Born: Doris More Lusk; 5 May 1916; Dunedin, New Zealand
- Died: 14 April 1990 (aged 73); Christchurch, New Zealand
- Known for: Painting
- Spouse: Dermot Holland (m. 1942)

Doris More Lusk (5 May 1916 – 14 April 1990) was a New Zealand painter, potter, art teacher, and university lecturer. As a potter, she was known under her married name Doris Holland. In 1990 she was posthumously awarded the Governor General Art Award in recognition of her artistic career and contributions.

== Early life ==
Lusk was born in Dunedin, New Zealand, on 5 May 1916. She was the daughter of Alice Mary (née Coats), and Thomas Younger Lusk, a draughtsman and architect, and had two older siblings, Marion and Paxton.

The family moved to Hamilton where she went to primary school. An artist who had a studio near the family's home encouraged Lusk to paint. In 1928, the family returned to Dunedin where her father joined the architectural firm, Mandeno and Frazer. Lusk completed one more year at Arthur Street Primary School before attending Otago Girl's High School in 1930.

In 1933, Lusk left high school before she had matriculated, and enrolled in the Dunedin School of Art. Lusk enrolled against her father's wishes and later noted there had been "one hell of a row" about her decision.

Lusk attended art school from 1934 to 1939. The school was a member of the La Trobe programme which involved bringing practising artists from England to staff New Zealand schools. These artists included W. H. Allen and R. N Field, who both arrived in 1925, and who had a major impact on the Dunedin art scene.

Lusk was taught by J. D. Charlton Edgar and took life classes under Russell Clark in his studio. Through a fellow student, Anne Hamblett, she met Colin McCahon and Toss Woollaston.

== Career ==
In 1939 Lusk and a small group of artists rented a studio in central Dunedin on the corner of Moray Place and Princes Street. It was here that her first solo show was held in 1940.

In December 1942 Lusk married Dermot Holland, and in 1943 the couple moved to Christchurch. Lusk quickly became affiliated with The Group, an association of artists based in Christchurch with ties to artists throughout New Zealand. Although Lusk's painting was balanced with caring for her young children, she quickly became established as an artist especially known for her landscape paintings. The combined exhibitions held by The Group members suited her better than striving to make enough work for solo exhibitions at this point in her career, as she later recalled: "I did not paint in a continual professional manner. I painted when I could, and I would produce about six paintings a year, which was pretty good going in the circumstances".

In the 1940s Lusk completed a series of paintings, including Landscape, Overlooking Kaitawa, Waikaremoana (1948), which documented the massive engineering projects underlying the development of the Lake Waikaremoana hydroelectric scheme in the central North Island. She had a close friendship with Adelaide and Ian McCubbin – Ian was a construction engineer on the Lake Waikaremoana project. Through the McCubbins, Lusk was introduced to Onekaka in Golden Bay, and the long wharf built for the exporting of pig iron from the nearby ironworks. Lusk took this landscape as her main subject for the next five years.

In 1979, two years before she ceased teaching at the art school, Lusk began a series of works based on buildings in Christchurch's central city that were being demolished in order to build office buildings and apartment blocks. She worked from photographs that she took and collaged with images culled from newspapers, and translated these into paintings made with watercolour, acrylic and coloured pencil. In a 1983 interview Lusk denied that the subject carried any psychological charge, saying that, "My work is really very practical, and it would be quite dishonest if I tried to put in psychological meanings […] The Demolition works were a little misunderstood. [People thought] that I became very fascinated with the factual destruction of buildings as a sort of sociological thing. But that was not true […] It was a visual image to hang my media painting on, that’s all".

Lusk's late series of watercolours, The Arcade Awnings, based on the famous tourist scene at St Mark's Square in Venice, is held in the collection of the Auckland Art Gallery.

In Gordon H Brown and Hamish Keith's 1969 book An introduction to New Zealand painting 1839–1967 (the first modern overview of painting in New Zealand) Lusk's work was contextualised with that of artists such as Rita Angus, Colin McCahon, and Toss Woollaston. The authors wrote:

In a number of ways the unpretentious, well-considered and solid qualities of her work summed-up a good deal that was thought to be the best tendencies of the Canterbury painters during this decade. In essence it was straightforward, uncomplicated and while not denying detail when necessary, remained uncluttered. Doris Lusk continued to develop this style through the 1940s and fifties with paintings like Tahananui, Power House at Tuai and Botanical Gardens, Hāwera.

In a 1996 publication accompanying Landmarks: The Landscape Paintings of Doris Lusk, an exhibition of Lusk's work she co-curated, art historian Lisa Beaven disputed this assessment, writing:

An analysis of her art throughout her career reveals a deep fascination with particular motifs, centring around industrial imagery in landscape settings. For more than five decades, Lusk consistently pursued this preoccupation, using different techniques and employing different media. From being the result of random excursions, Lusk's paintings were directed explorations, not just of the relationship between the structures and the land around them, but also of the buildings themselves, and aspects of the juxtapositions of interior and exterior, exposure and concealment, surface and depth. The manifold layers of meaning embedded in the buildings and their role in projecting a certain mood, suggest her painting may profit from being read as expressions of moods, metaphors and symbols.

Art historian Julie King, in a review of Landmarks, noted that the exhibition gave the opportunity to assess Lusk's later paintings, and, "How she was positioned in relation to the new artistic models, values, and professionalism of the art institutional world which emerged in New Zealand in the late 1950s and '60s." King argued that the negative reception of Lusk's previous 1973 survey exhibition (organised by the Dowse Art Museum and toured to Auckland City Art Gallery) by Auckland critics reflected the, "exclusivity of the canon created in Auckland by critics and curators in the early '70s" and the way art history in New Zealand had been written, "with its focus on Colin McCahon and modernism, on internationalism and abstraction, so that placed within this context, her career appears peripheral."

In the same article, King examined how being a female artist may have inflected Lusk's career and opportunities:

Despite her reluctance to acknowledge the political issues surrounding women's art practice, Lusk's significance also lies within the history of women's artistic culture during the post-war period. At a time when social assumptions emphasised women's domestic role, she challenged these expectations by retaining her firm commitment to painting, and gained recognition as one of New Zealand's leading painters. Yet her painting was always fitted within the constraints of domestic life. After her marriage and birth of three children in the '40s, she dealt with the practicalities of looking after her family by painting in the kitchen, and it was not until the late '60s that she even had a studio of her own. Lusk was unable to study overseas until 1974, and her art was fitted into her personal life, so that visits to friends at Tuai and family holidays became her opportunity for painting.

In a 1996 article, art historian Grant Banbury noted that while Lusk was usually discussed in terms of her landscape painting, she also produced a number of portraits and self-portraits, and championed life drawing as both an artist and a teacher. Lusk mainly painted close friends, family and colleagues, along with a small number of commissions and several works painted in the 1970s based on images from newspapers. In 1939, while at art school, Lusk painted a portrait of Colin McCahon; nearly 50 years later, in 1987, Lusk painted Return to Otago, a portrait of Anne McCahon and their son William – Colin McCahon had died earlier that year.

== Career as a potter ==
In addition to her painting career, Lusk was also a pioneer potter in New Zealand. She was introduced to modelling with clay by Field while at art school, which ignited her interest in the medium. She made her ceramics largely under her married name, Doris Holland, most of it in earthenware.

In 1947 she began teaching pottery at Risingholme Community Centre with Margaret Frankel, and continued there until 1967. She was president of the Canterbury Potters' Association from 1970 to 1972. In 1970 she was awarded a travel scholarship by the Canterbury Society of Arts and used this to research contemporary Australian ceramics in Canberra, Adelaide, Alice Springs and Melbourne.

== Teaching career ==
Lusk was appointed a tutor at the University of Canterbury School of Fine Arts in 1966 and was made a permanent staff member within the following 18 months. She continued to teach at the School until 1981.

== Exhibiting career and retrospective exhibitions ==
Lusk exhibited mainly with The Group in Christchurch in the 1940s and 1950s. In the 1950s and 1960s her work was regularly included in the Auckland City Art Gallery's annual surveys of recent New Zealand painting.

The first retrospective exhibition of Lusk's work was held at the Dunedin Public Art Gallery in 1966. A second retrospective was held at the Dowse Art Museum in 1973. A major exhibition of her landscape works, Landmarks: The Landscape Paintings of Doris Lusk, was held at the Christchurch Art Gallery in 1996, accompanied by a publication with contributions by Lisa Beaven and Grant Banbury.

To mark the centenary of Lusk's birth in 1916, in 2016 exhibitions were held at the Dunedin Public Art Gallery (Doris Lusk 1916–1990) and Christchurch Art Gallery (Doris Lusk: Practical Visionary).

The Doris Lusk Ceramic Residency was established in 2014, and is open to all graduates of the Dunedin School of Art. The residency, worth $2000, allows a ceramicist to spend two weeks teaching at the Risingholme Community Centre. The recipient in 2017 was Kate Fitzharris.

== Collections ==
Examples of Lusk's work are held by most New Zealand public art galleries. Significant works include Tahunanui in the Hocken Collections; Tobacco Fields, Pangatotara, Nelson (1943) and The Pumping Station (1958) at the Auckland Art Gallery; Power House, Tuai (1948), Landscape, Overlooking Kaitawa, Waikaremoana (1948) and Canterbury Plains from Cashmere Hills (1952) at the Christchurch Art Gallery; Akaroa Harbour, Banks Peninsula (1949) in the collection of the Museum of New Zealand Te Papa Tongarewa.

== Legacy ==
In September 2026 it was announced that a new street in the Dunedin suburb of Calton Hill would be named Lusk Lane in Lanes' honour.

== Further information ==
- Courtney Johnston, Review of Doris Lusk centenary exhibitions, Radio New Zealand, 21 September 2016
- Anne Kirker, New Zealand Women Artists: A Survey of 150 Years (1986, Craftsman House) ISBN 976-8097-30-2
