= Harbour Cone from Peggy's Hill =

1939 oil painting by Colin McCahon

- Artist: Colin McCahon
- Year: 1939
- Medium: oil on hardwood
- Subject: New Zealand landscape
- Dimensions: 75 cm × 133.3 cm (30 in × 52.5 in)
- Condition: Good
- Location: Hocken Collections, Uare Taoka o Hakena, University of Otago; Otago
- Owner: John & Ethel McCahon Bequest, 1973
- Accession: 73/86

Harbour Cone from Peggy's Hill (1939) is an early oil painting by New Zealand artist Colin McCahon.

== Subject ==
Harbour Cone from Peggy's Hill is one of McCahon's earliest explorations of the Otago region. It depicts an elevated stance from the mountain tops, looking down towards Harbour Cone in the Otago Peninsula. This work is one of his more realistic creations - showing a clear landscape theme.

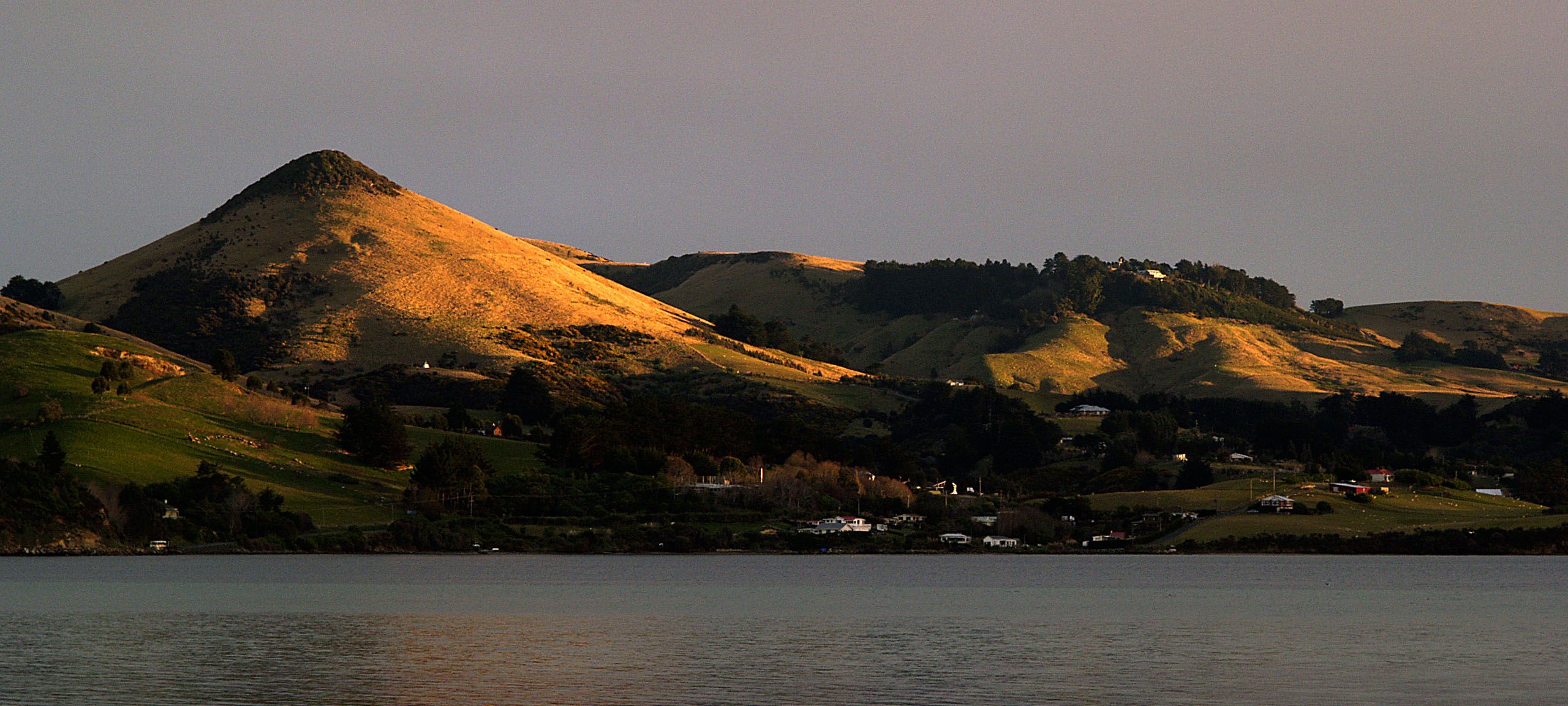
Harbour Cone, Otago Peninsula

In addition to this exoteric representation, Harbour Cone from Peggy's Hill also contains more esoteric meanings. McCahon wanted this artwork to express "the concept of nature as a spiritual and redeeming force." In a letter to his friend Toss Woollaston he explained:

I imagined people looking at it then looking at the landscape and for once

really seeing it & being happier for it & believing in God & then the

brotherhood of men & the futility of war.

— Colin McCahon to Toss Woollaston (1939),

Because of comments such as these, the painting has been read as an evangelical statement designed to connect together God, peace, and the landscape.

== Reception ==
=== Early Controversy ===
Harbour Cone from Peggy's Hill was behind one of the earliest controversies in McCahon's long career. It was excluded from the 1939 Otago Art Society exhibition, despite the fact that each member (including McCahon) was entitled to display one work. Linda Tyler believes that this rejection was due to the absence of support "from an interested and informed public."
