= Rodney Kennedy =

New Zealand artist, art critic, pacifist, drama tutor

- Born: 20 August 1909; Dunedin
- Died: 14 October 1989 (aged 80); Dunedin
- Education: King Edward Technical College Art School
- Known for: Art collecting, painting, theatre production and design

Rodney Eric Kennedy (20 August 1909 – 14 October 1989) was a New Zealand artist, art critic, pacifist and drama tutor. He was born in Dunedin.

== Early life ==
Rodney Kennedy was the son of Alexander Kennedy and Lillian Ellice Brown. From the age of 6 to 8 Kennedy suffered from the muscle wasting disease poliomyelitis. He attended the George Street and Anderson Bay Schools in Dunedin and in 1928 he became a full-time student at the art school attached to the King Edward Technical College in Dunedin to study under R N Field. The same year Kennedy was a founding member of W.H.Allen and Field's art group, the Six and Four Club (six women, four men) a mix of teachers and students. The meetings required students to produce a work at the meeting followed by discussion. (A.K.C.Petersen R.N.Field: the Dunedin Years 1925–1945 Manawatu Art Gallery 1989, pg 26 ) While he was a student at the art school Kennedy met MT (Toss) Woollaston in 1932 and the two form a romantic relationship that lasted until Woollaston moved to Māpua. Kennedy and Woollaston remained life-long friends and in 1938 joined the Society of Friends (Quakers) together. In 1938 Kennedy and Colin McCahon biked from Dunedin to Nelson for the fruit picking season. They visited Woollaston who began his long friendship with McCahon. The poet Charles Brasch said of Kennedy, ‘He gave his friendship to other artists…having abandoned painting himself as if to serve his friends.’ Thanks to his art training Kennedy worked as an artist (illustrator) in the Public Health Department of the Otago Medical School. During World War II Kennedy was interned at Whitanui Detention Camp near Shannon as a conscientious objector. Although a Quaker, he had refused to plead at his hearing. While at the camp he became involved with a theatre group and produced plays including The Whitanui Detention Camp: Presentation of 'The Beautiful People', by William Saroyan. In 1948, Kennedy became the partner of Charles Brasch the poet and editor of the literary magazine Landfall. Brasch also had a passionate interested in the arts and together they went on to create an important collection of contemporary New Zealand art.

== Art career ==
Kennedy first publicly exhibited his paintings in 1934 in the New Zealand Society of Artists exhibition, Pioneer Hall Dunedin. In reviewing the work Eros commented, ‘in Kennedy's Landscape a more reserved and subtle use of colour is made. His interest is obviously centred in the study of rhythm and form.’ The Evening Star critic enthused, ‘An extremely sympathetic group of works by Rodney Kennedy. The two landscapes...show a rhythmical unity lacking in better painted pictures. The colour is sensitive and restrained. Such pictures repay more than a hurried glance and are keenly satisfying to one who looks for more than mere naturalism in a landscape.’

In 1940 Kennedy joined other young artists, including Anne Hamblett, in removing their works at the opening of the Otago Art Society exhibition in protest at the Society refusing to hang a painting by Colin McCahon.

== Theatre career ==
By 1938 Kennedy's interests had moved toward theatre. Before World War II he and Colin McCahon with assistance from Doris Lusk had designed sets for the Left Book Club's production Karel Čapek's Insect Play. The production included Kennedy and McCahon's friend Ron O’Reilly in the cast as an ant. O’Reilly remembered being impressed by, ‘the directness and fresh unconventionality’ of Kennedy and McCahon's work on the set, ‘contriving powerful and beautiful effects from meagre materials.’

At the end of World War II Kennedy was released from the internment camp and returned to Dunedin where he was appointed Country Drama Tutor, Adult Education Department Otago University and became involved in a number of theatre productions. In 1949 Kennedy played the Herald in Ngaio Marsh's production of William Shakespeare's Othello the Moor of Venice in the Canterbury University College Drama Society . The production went on to tour Australia. The 1950s saw Kennedy and McCahon continue working together on the sets and costumes for a number of productions including: Peer Gynt, (1953), Swan Lake (1954), and The Glass Menagerie in 1956. By 1970 Kennedy was a lecturer in drama at the Department of University of Otago extensions in Dunedin. He continued with his theatre work including:

- Designer of the costumes for the Globe theatre's production of James K Baxter's play Temptation of Oedipus in 1970 with Ralph Hotere designing the sets.
- Director of Early morning by Edward Bond in 1970.

In 1971 Kennedy retired from Otago University and for three years was Honorary Director of the Globe Theatre.

== Art collecting ==
Kennedy had already amassed an important collection of contemporary New Zealand paintings before his association with Brasch began. From their first meeting Brasch recalled him as someone, ‘‘who always had paintings and drawings by Toss (Woollaston) which he showed to everyone interested. He believed in Toss without reserve, generously, selflessly; his enthusiasm was catching.”

Among key works owned by Kennedy were:

- Toss Woollaston Landscape Tahunanui 1934.
- Toss Woollaston Portrait of Rodney Kennedy 1936.
- Colin McCahon Otago Peninsula (1946–49). Painted for Kennedy this work had pride of place above the fireplace at his home in Royal Terrace. McCahon expert Peter Simpson described the work as McCahon's ‘first fully successful painting’ Kennedy donated Otago Peninsula to the Dunedin Public Library to mark its support of young artists during the 1930s and 1940s when it made exhibition space available in the foyer for them to show their work. The painting still hangs in the Library.
- Colin McCahon Crucifixion (for Rodney Kennedy ) 1947. This prized work has had a very extensive public exhibition history. It is still in private hands.
- Colin McCahon Kennedy Waterfall Series (c. 1960s).
- Colin McCahon Angels and Bed No 1 1976. After he had had a bad fall from a ladder, McCahon gave this picture to Kennedy, a gesture he repeated with a number of close friends struck by health calamities.

In 1958 a selection of the works accumulated by Brasch and Kennedy was shown at the Auckland City Art Gallery as Thirty-seven New Zealand Paintings from the collection of Charles Brasch and Rodney Kennedy. The exhibition featured work by artists including Evelyn Page, John Weeks, Louise Henderson, M.T. Woollaston, Doris Lusk, John Drawbridge, and Frances Hodgkins. McCahon was represented by The Virgin Compared (1948). The Director of the Gallery Peter Tomory described the collection as 'the most extensive and carefully chosen in the Dominion.' Kennedy began to make a number of gifts to the Hocken Collections at the University of Otago in 1956. These included the drawing by McCahon In 1968 Kennedy and Brasch both made major gifts to the Hocken Collections and Kennedy continued to do throughout the 1970s and into the 1980s. His last gift was made in 1988.

Rodney Kennedy died in Dunedin on 14 October 1989.
