= Colin McCahon =

New Zealand artist (1919–1987)

Colin J. McCahon
- Born: 1 August 1919; Timaru, Timaru District, New Zealand
- Died: 27 May 1987 (aged 67); Auckland, Auckland Region, New Zealand
- Resting place: Ashes scattered at Muriwai, Auckland Region, New Zealand
- Education: Otago Boys' High School
- Known for: Painting
- Movement: Modernism
- Spouse: Anne Hamblett (1915–1993)

Colin John McCahon (/məˈkɑːn/; 1 August 1919 – 27 May 1987) was a New Zealand artist whose work over 45 years consisted of various styles, including landscape, figuration, abstraction, and the overlay of painted text. Along with Toss Woollaston and Rita Angus, McCahon is credited with introducing modernism to New Zealand in the mid-20th century. He is regarded as New Zealand's most important modern artist, particularly in his landscape work.

== Early life and education ==
McCahon was born in Timaru on 1 August 1919 the second of three children of Ethel Beatrice Ferrier and her husband John Kernohan McCahon. He spent most of his childhood in Dunedin, although his family lived in Oamaru for one year. He showed an early interest in art, influenced by regular visits to exhibitions and the work of his maternal grandfather, photographer and painter William Ferrier, which hung in the family home. He attended the Maori Hill Primary School and Otago Boys' High School, which he called: "the most unforgettable horror of my youth".

At the age of 14, convinced he wanted to be an artist, McCahon took Russell Clark's Saturday-morning art classes to learn the fundamental skills of painting. Visits to an exhibition by Toss Woollaston, whose landscapes, "clean, bright with New Zealand light, and full of air", also inspired him to become a painter. McCahon later attended the Dunedin School of Art (now known as Otago Polytechnic) from 1937 to 1939, where his teacher Robert Nettleton Field proved to be an inspirational influence. After leaving Otago, McCahon attended King Edward Technical College Art School as a part-time student.

He first exhibited his work at the Otago Art Society in 1939. His painting Harbour Cone from Peggy’s Hill was considered too abstract and was excluded from the Otago Art Society's exhibition, despite a rule entitling each member to submit one work. The society's conventions of good taste were challenged by McCahon's modernist style, which reduced the volcanic cones of the Otago Peninsula to a topographic series of bare, almost monochromatic forms. The protests of other young artists, who withdrew their works in sympathy, forced the society to relent and display the work.

McCahon supported himself in the late 1930s with a stint of working in a touring variety show, stage scenery painting, and fruit picking. Some of these jobs were undertaken during his voluntary service for the state during World War II.

== War years ==
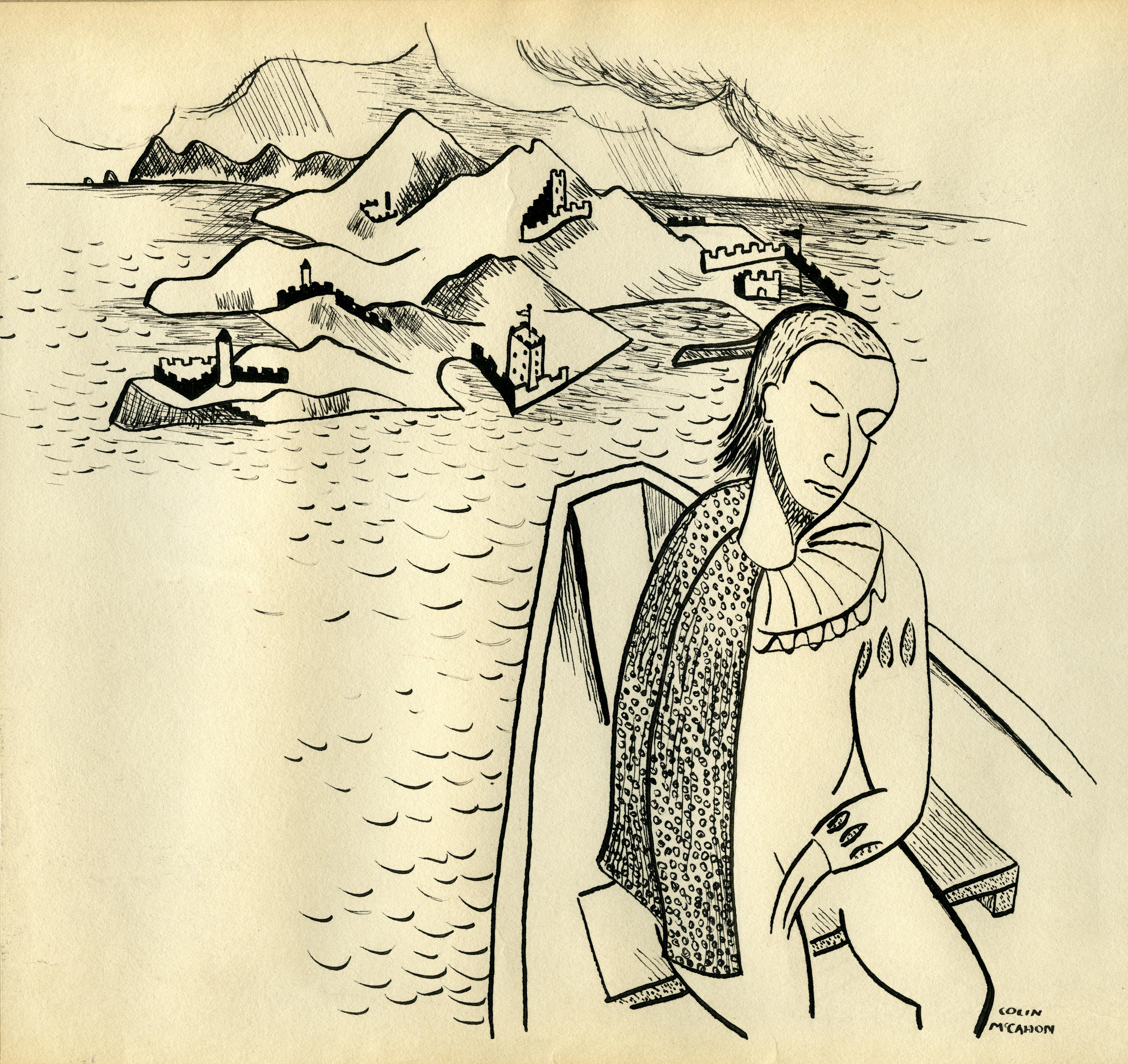
Untitled image by McCahon commissioned for the New Zealand School Journal

At the beginning of World War II, McCahon had initially tried to enlist for military service after deciding that the defeat of fascism was a global necessity, even from his pacifist standpoint. He was rejected from active service due to an enlarged heart.

In September 1940 and November 1943, he was guest exhibitor with The Group show in Christchurch. He became a member of The Group in 1947 and contributed work regularly until its demise in 1977. During 1944, McCahon collaborated with his wife producing watercolours collectively called Pictures for Children. In 1940, he had a small exhibit in Wellington and produced his first commissioned work, Otago Peninsula.

Between 1940 and 1950, McCahon was commissioned by the Department of Education to produce an illustration for the New Zealand School Journal. This illustration is now held at the Archives New Zealand.

Later, leaving his family at home, he travelled around the South Island for seasonal work, which subsequently led to his artwork reflecting the places where he travelled, particularly the Nelson region.

McCahon's first mature works, religious paintings and symbolic landscapes, such as The Angel of the Annunciation, Takaka: Night and Day, and The Promised Land, were produced in the years immediately after the war. During this time, a notable portrait of McCahon was painted by Doris Lusk.

== Married life ==
McCahon married fellow artist Anne Hamblett (1915–1993) in 1942 at St. Matthew's Church, Dunedin. As a wedding present, McCahon and Hamblett received a book by C. A. Cotton, The Geomorphology of New Zealand. This book proved to have an influence on his art.

As McCahon relied on seasonal work, his wife returned to live with her parents. Over the next five years, their time together was intermittent. The couple had four children – two daughters and two sons: William, Catherine, Victoria and Matthew.

== Career ==
McCahon began the first of his early religious paintings, I Paul to you at Ngatimoti, in 1946 in Nelson. These works depicted events from Christ's life in a New Zealand setting. McCahon was never a member of a church, but acknowledged that religious questions were central to his work. In the 1940s, words began to appear in his work often resulting in public criticism. McCahon felt the directness of words could help, provide a 'way in' to his images, a long tradition within painted images, especially in religious art.

In 1947, he worked as a labourer, and in 1948 worked as a gardener in Christchurch. His friend R. N. O'Reilly organised an exhibit at the Wellington Public Library February 1947, then at the Lower Hutt Municipal Public Library. In September 1947, McCahon showed a different selection at the Dunedin Public Library.

By 1948, McCahon and Hamblett had relocated to Christchurch. McCahon met poet John Caselberg in Christchurch in October 1948. McCahon collaborated with Caselberg on various works that fused words and images.

The support of the poet and editor, Charles Brasch, enabled McCahon to visit Melbourne from July to August 1951 to study paintings in the National Gallery of Victoria. In August 1949, Helen Hitchings's gallery mounted a joint exhibition of works by McCahon and Woollaston in Wellington; a selection was shown in Auckland later that month.

In May 1953, McCahon moved his family to Titirangi, Auckland, where they bought a house. Partly as a result of his exposure to the area, McCahon painted many landscapes featuring beaches, the sea, the sky, land, boats, and kauri trees. He started working at the Auckland City Art Gallery first as a cleaner, then as a custodian of the paintings, and finally, in April 1956, as the deputy director. McCahon assisted in the professionalisation of the gallery and helped it mount the first exhibitions and publications to record New Zealand art history.

From April to July 1958, McCahon and his wife visited the United States on gallery business. They used the visit as an opportunity to view art that interested them in major galleries. Colin and Ann McCahon visited galleries and museums throughout America. Paintings such as The Wake and the Northland Panels reflect McCahon's immediate response to this visit, which accelerated his stylistic development during the following decade.

In 1964, McCahon started working as a lecturer at the Elam School of Fine Arts at the University of Auckland.

== Teaching and exhibiting ==
In 1960, the family moved to a house in central Auckland. In August 1964, McCahon resigned from the Auckland City Art Gallery and began lecturing at the University of Auckland's Elam School of Fine Arts, where he remained for six years, influencing a generation of artists, including Richard Killeen, Robin White, and Ian Scott.

During the 1960s, McCahon's work enjoyed increased exposure and recognition in New Zealand and internationally. McCahon worked almost exclusively in black and white after the mid-'60s and produced a number of works combining numbers and texts, such as Io, and Lark's Song was based on a poem by Matire Kereama, whose book The Tail of the Fish deepened McCahon's interest in Māoritanga and Māori imagery.

In January 1971, he left Elam School of Fine Arts to paint full-time. McCahon produced both word and landscape paintings during this period, but words increasingly began to dominate his output. His works from this period include Victory Over Death 2, gifted to the Australian National Gallery by the New Zealand Government, Gate III, which was made for Auckland Art Gallery's Ten Big Paintings exhibition and later sold to Victoria University, and the Necessary Protection series along with numerous landscapes of the Kaipara area.

Lois McIvor lived very close to McCahon in Titirangi, nearly next door, and was under the private tutelage of McCahon.

A second retrospective of his work was presented at Auckland City Art Gallery in 1972, which later toured New Zealand.

== Later years ==
In 1975, the Manawatu Art Gallery's director Luit Bieringa mounted the first exhibition to examine in detail a particular aspect of his past work, McCahon: Religious' Works 1946–1952. The implications of recent work were dealt with in the Govett-Brewster Art Gallery's 1977 exhibition McCahon's Necessary Protection; both exhibitions toured. Although McCahon's work still attracted derision, support for his work was growing.

By the late 1970s, McCahon's health had deteriorated because of his long-term alcoholism, and he was suffering from dementia through Korsakov's syndrome by the mid-1980s.

Fatu Feu'u founded Tautai Pacific Charitable Trust after having a conversation with McCahon in the 1980s, when McCahon told Fatu that the New Zealand art world was waiting for Pacific artists to make a serious contribution. Tautai was the first Pacific gallery in New Zealand. Fatu Feu'u is still a patron to this day.

In 1984, the exhibition "I Will Need Words" was presented as part of the Biennale of Sydney; McCahon was barely able to appreciate his growing international reputation due to his ill health. He died in Auckland City Hospital on 27 May 1987. On 6 June 1988, his ashes were scattered throughout the Muriwai headland.

Auckland City Art Gallery presented another retrospective, "Colin McCahon: Gates and Journeys", the following year. Further major exhibitions both in New Zealand and overseas have followed.

== Style and themes ==
McCahon is best known for his large paintings with dark backgrounds overlaid with religious texts in white. He was also an extensive landscape painter and was inspired in part by the writings of New Zealand geologist Sir Charles A Cotton in The Geomorphology of New Zealand (3rd ed. 1942), a scientific text that examined landscape forms and processes, illustrated with sketches, diagrams, and photographs. These diagrams ignored built features, trees, and objects irrelevant to his scientific themes as he attempted to strip the landscape to its geological basis. These precise drawings would inform McCahon in his efforts to find the landscape's spiritual basis.

After returning to New Zealand from visiting America in 1958, a significant change occurred in McCahon's work. Instead of using frames, he worked with unstretched and unframed canvas, and other changes included a considerable increase in scale; the creation of series of works in contrast to individual paintings; and "a new gestural freedom in his brushwork." These differences were apparent in Northland Panels and The Wake.

Thematically, his art was at times concerned with developing a painterly nationalism. McCahon himself explored issues of Christianity and pacifism both within and outside of this national identity.

McCahon's graphic design work in theatre, posters, and jewelry is lesser known, although said to be influential in his art practice.

Of his painting Jump, McCahon wrote in 1971:

I am not painting protest pictures. I am painting about what is still there and what I can see before the sky turns black with soot and the sea becomes a slowly heaving rubbish tip. I am painting what we have got now and will never get again. This is one shape or form, has been the subject of my painting for a very long time.

He felt that:

Most of my work has been aimed at relating man to man to this world, to an acceptance of the very beautiful and terrible mysteries that we are part of. I aim at very direct statement and ask for a simple and direct response. Any other way the message gets lost.

My painting is almost entirely autobiographical – it tells you where I am at any given point in time, where I am living and the direction I am pointing in. In this present time it is very difficult to paint for other people – to paint beyond your own ends and point directions as painters once did. Once the painter was making signs and symbols for people to live by; now he makes things to hang on walls at exhibitions.

=== Influences ===
At the Dunedin School of Art, McCahon met Rodney Eric Kennedy, Doris Lusk, Anne Hamblett, and Patrick Hayman, a group whose members all went on to become notable New Zealand artists. J. D. Charlton Edgar and Arthur Gordon Tovey were among their teachers.

He met Mary Cockburn-Mercer in 1953 on a trip to Melbourne; she rekindled his interest in cubism. During a visit to the United States in 1958, McCahon saw paintings by Barnett Newman, Kazimir Malevich, Jackson Pollock, Richard Diebenkorn, Mark Rothko, Piet Mondrian, and Willem de Kooning. Before this trip, he had only seen these works reproduced in books. He was struck by the physicality of Pollock's works and he described them as "pictures for people to walk past." He was also influenced by the installations of Allan Kaprow and the sensation of walking through an artwork rather than walking past it. McCahon had visited the studio of Kaprow and he also saw Kaprow's work exhibited in New York at the Hansa Gallery.

After this trip, McCahon's use of scale and space shifted, most notably in The Northland Panels, his work consisted of eight panels, monocoat on canvas. Another work completed in 1958, after McCahon's return from America, was The Wake, which was exhibited at The Gallery in Symonds Street, Auckland. The Wake consisted of 16 panels and incorporated words from poems by John Caselberg. McCahon used Allan Kaprow's term 'environment' when he described the work in a lecture in 1963 as having been hung to "create a complete environment."

== Landscape ==
A constant theme throughout McCahon's art is his exploration of the religious. His landscapes, in particular, are imbued with a sense of the spiritual. Even more overtly, McCahon often sets Biblical scenes in the contemporary New Zealand landscape. His Otago Peninsula (1949), currently in the collection of the Dunedin Public Library, was the realisation of a schoolboy vision inspired by Otago.

A Te Papa profile of McCahon has described his landscapes as "often stark and empty (rather than picturesque), raising questions about the human histories of these seemingly unpopulated landscapes."

=== Muriwai paintings ===
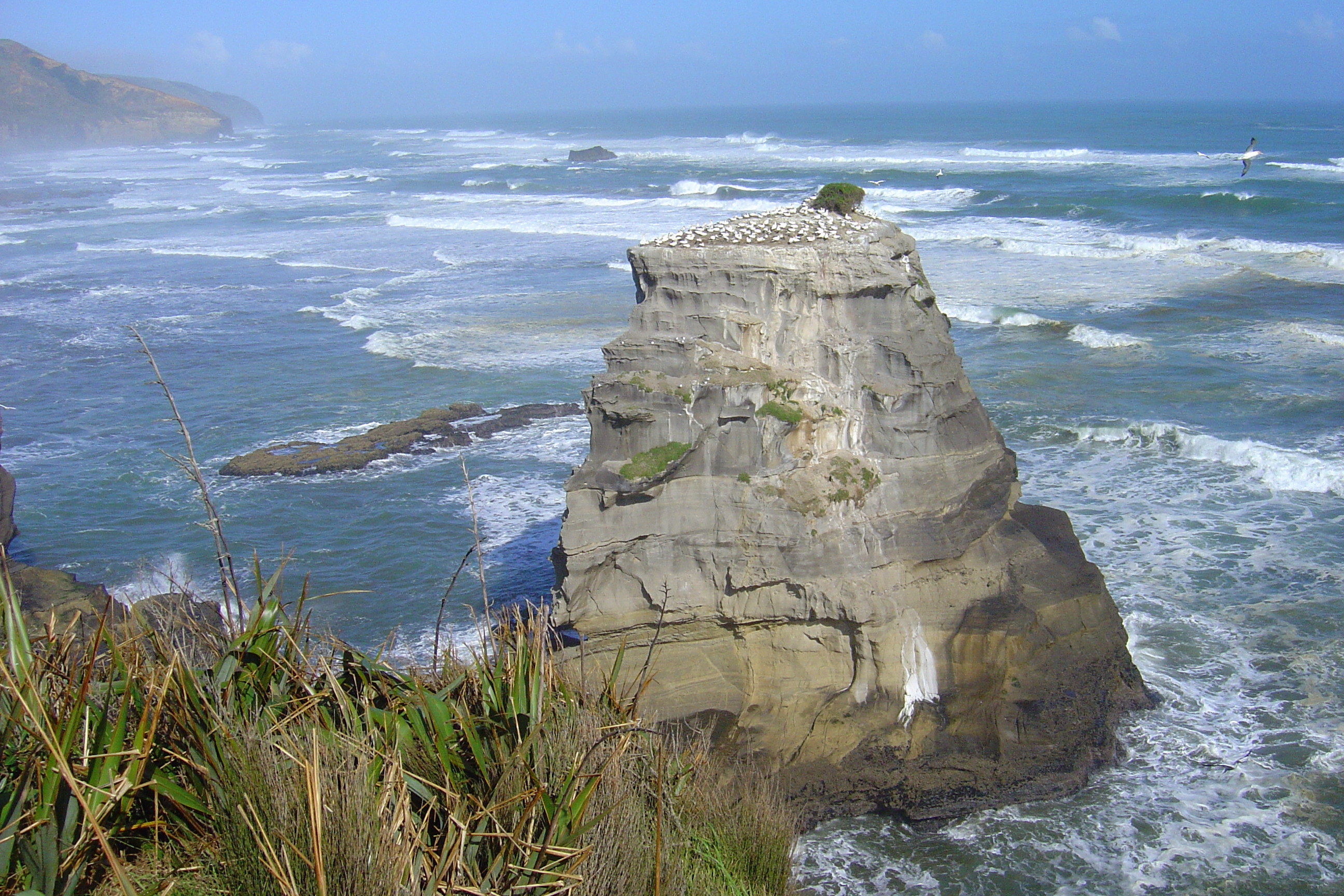
The gannet colony off the Muriwai coast that was a muse for McCahon

In the series Necessary Protection, McCahon represents the Muriwai coastline as a site of spiritual nourishment.

=== Word paintings ===
McCahon's large-format "word paintings" combine his religious and abstraction tendencies. His early religious paintings created a very literal connection between the events and locations of the Bible and his native soil. He started incorporating words into his paintings in the 1940s, a move often criticised by the public, but which he felt was necessary to directly communicate with the viewers of his art. The Early Religious Paintings are testament to McCahon's 1939 aim to connect God and land for the sake of peace.

== Selected works ==
- Christ Taken from the Cross 1947 view
- Six Days in Canterbury and Nelson 1950 view
- North Canterbury Landscape 1951 view
- Northland Panels 1958 view
- Painting 1958 view
- Tomorrow will be the same but not as this is 1959 view
- Waioneke 1961 view
- Visible Mysteries No 1 1968 view
- The Lark’s Song 1969 view
- Victory Over Death 2 1970 view
- The days and nights in the wilderness, showing the constant flow of light passing into a dark landscape 1971 view
- Parihaka Triptych 1972 view
- Teaching aids 2 (July) 1975 view
- Am I Scared 1976 view
- A Painting for Uncle Frank 1980 view
- I applied my Mind 1982 view

== Legacy ==
=== Family house museum ===
The McCahon family house near French Bay, Titirangi, Auckland, now serves as a small museum about Colin McCahon and his family. The house is surrounded by kauri trees.

=== McCahon House Trust, artists' residency ===
A more contemporary house and studio on the same section of land serves as the base for the McCahon House artists' residency. The contemporary house has hosted three artists for three months every year since 2006.

Richard Lewer was artist in residence in 2008. In 2021 residencies were awarded to: Emily Karaka, Moniek Schrijer, and Cora-Allan Wickliffe. In 2022 Tanu Gogo was in-residence. Other artists who have completed a residency include Judy Millar, Andrew McLeod, James Robinson, Gavin Hipkins, Rohan Wealleans, Luise Fong, Eve Armstrong, Lisa Reihana, Ava Seymour, Andy Leleisi’uao, Jim Speers, Liyen Chong, Tim Wagg, and Wayne Youle.

=== Retrospectives ===
A major retrospective of his work at the Stedelijk Museum in Amsterdam in 2002 introduced McCahon as "the first modern New Zealand painter of major international importance."

=== Stolen works ===
Urewera Mural by McCahon, completed May 1976. It was famously stolen in 1997.

In June 1997, the Urewera Mural, a triptych, was stolen from the reception of the Department of Conservation Āniwaniwa Visitor Centre at Lake Waikaremoana. It was eventually determined that the painting had been stolen by Tuhoe activist Te Kaha and an associate Laurie Davis. After missing for 15 months, it was returned in August 1998 after negotiations involving arts patron Jenny Gibbs, Te Kaha, and Tuhoe member Tame Iti. It required more than $5,000 worth of repairs once it had been returned. It was finally returned to the visitors' centre in September 1999. When it was stolen, the mural was thought to be worth $1.2 million, but that figure was later revised upward to $2M.

In late 2006, manuscripts, including seven Colin McCahon poems, along with a Charles Goldie painting, and an unbound copy of the Oxford Lectern Bible, were stolen from the University of Auckland Library during the Christmas break. The thieves are believed to have broken into a secure room at the library by prying open a locked window. Art experts and police said at the time that selling the paintings in New Zealand or overseas would be difficult, as anyone who knew about the artists would be very suspicious. By October 2007, all the stolen items, valued at over $200,000, were returned. Negotiations between police and a man who knew the thieves concluded the case. Following this incident, security was increased at the library.

=== Controversies ===
From 1998 - 2001 the 'Parade' exhibition at Te Papa Tongarewa, which sought to mix high and more popular culture, courted controversy when it placed McCahon's Northland Panels beside another New Zealand Icon - Fisher and Paykel's Kelvinator fridge. Board members, politicians and academics waged a battle resulting in the eventual scrapping of the Parade as the curatorial proposition behind it (led by Ian Wedde) was seen as curatorial overreach.

=== In popular culture ===
Tobias Cummings and The Long Way Home's "Canoe Song" refers to several of McCahon's works on their debut album, Join the Dots.

Two interviews with McCahon recorded by artist Ray Thorburn in 1976 and 1982 are available on YouTube

McCahon was the subject of a 2004 biographical documentary titled Colin McCahon: I Am, produced by Television New Zealand and directed by Paul Swadel.

=== Memory of the World ===
Many of Colin and Anne's personal papers were archived by the Hocken Collections. In 2020, these were inscribed on the UNESCO Memory of the World Aotearoa New Zealand Ngā Mahara o te Ao register.
