= Ten Big Paintings =

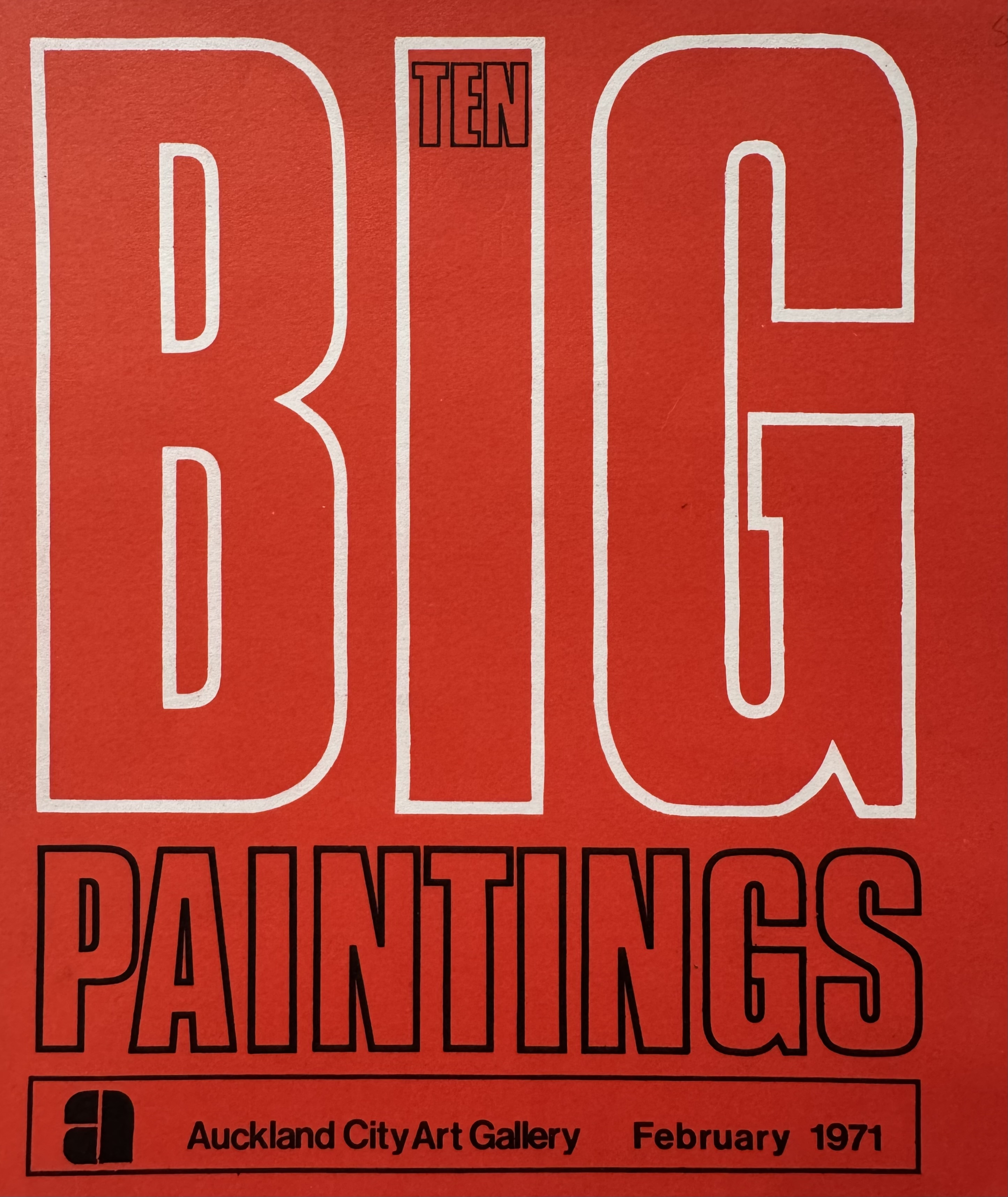
'Ten Big Paintings' catalogue, February 1971

Ten Big Paintings was a 1971 art exhibition developed by the Auckland City Art Gallery (now known as Auckland Art Gallery Toi o Tāmaki) which toured throughout New Zealand.

== History ==
In May 1969, in anticipation of the opening of the new Edmiston Wing at the Auckland Art Gallery, Hamish Keith and the staff developed the concept for an exhibition of large paintings on canvas. Ten Big Paintings was commissioned by Keith who was the gallery's Keeper of Collections. There was a recognition at the time that the scale of painting in New Zealand was small compared to contemporary painting overseas. The Museum of Modern Art had an exhibition Large-scale Modern Painting devoted to the idea as far back as 1947. Keith had been impressed by Colin McCahon painting the large-scale Northland Panels on his return from a visit to the United States in 1958. The painter Ross Ritchie, who was also working at the gallery, had experience of painting billboards and was familiar with the established size for these works as being 10 x 20 feet (3.1 x 6.1 meters). This then was the size selected for the five part stretcher mounted canvases that were sent out to the artists and, as the gallery director Gill Docking noted in the catalogue introduction, ‘Each painter was left with complete autonomy over their work but was given a chance to do something which, under normal circumstances, could be uneconomic.’ The exhibition was opened at the Auckland Art Gallery by Princess Alexandra on the 9 February and ran to 28 March after which it toured to Wellington, Christchurch and Dunedin. The paintings were literally too big for the National Art Gallery in Wellington and were shown next door at the Academy of Fine Arts and too large also for the Robert McDougall Art Gallery where part of the exhibition was shown at the Canterbury Society of Arts Gallery.

== The artists and the paintings ==
Don Driver Five Part Work. The painting was gifted to the Govett-Brewster Art Gallery by Driver in 1973 Driver also painted a smaller version of the work Dimension No 6 that is in the collection of Te Manawa in Palmerston North.

Michael Eaton Untitled 1970–71. Unlike the other painters Eaton turned the four units of the large canvas on their sides to create an elongated landscape 5 x 40 feet (1.5 x 12.2 meters)

Robert Ellis Journey. Art critic Hamish Keith described Ellis's painting as, ‘expanding the image of megalomaniacal roading to a planetary scale, and out of it [making] a powerful and dynamic image of intersecting thousand lane motorways against a richly mosaic surface.’

Pat Hanly Whence come we? What are we? Whither go we? Hanly was unhappy with his painting and on its return from the Ten Big Paintings exhibition, separated the three panels and painted over his work using one of the panels as a large kite.

Ralph Hotere February May and the Birds of Ice the Moon Drowns in its Voice of Water. Hotere's painting was purchased by the Dunedin Public Art Gallery in 1974.

Colin McCahon Gate III. McCahon painted this work at the Auckland University Art School where he was still teaching. In 1972 historian Tim Beaglehole arranged the purchase of Gate III for Victoria University. The purchase was made via McCahon's Wellington dealer Peter McLeavey at a cost of $4,000.

Milan Mrkusich Untitled. Like many of the other artists in the exhibition Mrkusich's studio was too small to accommodate even one of the four panels. Instead each panel was painted individually in the family's lounge, Mrkusich having first removed all the furniture.

Don Peebles Painting 1970. Peebles and Michael Eaton were the only two South Island artists included in the exhibition.

Ross Ritchie Inch. Art critic T. J. McNamara said of Ritchie's work that it, ‘…dances lines around the canvas in glowing colours and happy areas of paint advance and recede in a delightful fashion. The picture goes a long way toward fulfilling the promise Ross Ritchie has shown in recent years.’

Wong Sing Tai Dedicated to Amoghasiddhi. When the exhibition showed at the National Art Gallery in Wellington (now Te Papa Tongarewa) the photographer Ans Westra took a number of images of the works including the painting by Wong Sing Tai. At 28 Sing Tai was the youngest of the artists chosen.

== Big paintings ==
Prior to the exhibition, the biggest painting on canvas or board in New Zealand was almost certainly Colin McCahon's Practical Religion, at just under 17 square metres. McCahon himself once referred to it as a ‘monster’. Before this was painted the biggest painting on canvas in the country was Frederick Goodall's Flight Into Egypt, held by the Sarjeant Gallery and measuring 10.8 sq.m framed or 7.7 sq.m unframed. Other substantial paintings at this time included Frank Brangwyn’s 7.7 sq.m. The Card Players: Agricultural Workers at Rest at the National Gallery in Wellington. At the Auckland Art Gallery The Arrival of the Maoris in New Zealand, C F Goldie and John Louis Steele’s version of Géricault’s Raft of the Medusa was a wall-filling 4.9 sq.m., but tiny compared to the Géricault original (35 sq.m.).

In terms of modern painting the average size of works in the Ten Big Paintings exhibition was 18.91 sq.m. with McCahon's Gate III at 32.5 sq.m. This made the McCahon work a good deal larger than Picasso’s Guernica (27.3 sq.m.) but well shy of James Rosenquist's F-111, (80 sq.m.).
