= Linda Tyler =

New Zealand art historian

- Born: 1961
- Awards: Associate Emeritus of Auckland War Memorial Museum

Academic background
- Education: University of Auckland
- Thesis: Drawn from Nature: art and science in the work of John Buchanan (2018)
- Doctoral advisor: Leonard Bell

Academic work
- Institutions: University of Auckland, University of Canterbury, Victoria University of Wellington, Hocken Collections

Linda Rose Tyler is a New Zealand art historian, and is an associate professor at the University of Auckland. Tyler was awarded an Auckland Museum Medal in 2014 for her work promoting the use of museum collections.

== Academic career ==
Tyler completed a Master's in Fine Arts degree at the University of Canterbury in 1986, studying émigré architect Ernst Plischke. She later completed a PhD on botanist and artist John Buchanan titled Drawn from Nature: art and science in the work of John Buchanan at the University of Auckland in 2018. Tyler was the Curator of the art collection at the Waikato Museum of Art and History, and then Curator of the Pictorial Collection at the Hocken Collections in Dunedin. She has taught art and design history and curation at the University of Canterbury, Victoria University of Wellington, the University of Waikato and the University of Auckland.

Tyler published a chapter on Anne Hamblett, artist and wife of Colin McCahon, and later curated the exhibition A Table Of One’s Own: The Creative Life Of Anne McCahon, which was on at Te Uru Waitakere Contemporary Gallery to celebrate the tenth anniversary of McCahon House in 2016. She also created the exhibition on Robin White, Island Life: Robin White: Robin White in New Zealand and Kiribati, which was toured by the Hocken University Library.

Tyler writes for Architecture Now and Pantograph Punch. In 2019 Tyler mentored Auckland artist Dominique Baker through The Big Idea's Mentoring in the Arts programme. She has also judged for a number of competitions, including for the Wallace Art Awards and the Adam Portraiture Award, and curated the 2022 Sculpture in the Gardens in Auckland Botanic Gardens.

== Honours and awards ==
In 2014 Tyler was awarded associate status at the Auckland War Memorial Museum through the awarding of an Auckland Museum Medal, with the citation noting that she "has championed the role of university collections and museums and represented New Zealand at international conferences".

== Selected works ==
- Strachan, Stuart; Tyler, Linda (2007). Kā taoka Hākena = Treasures from the Hocken collections. Dunedin, N.Z.: Otago University Press. ISBN 9781877372407.
- Tyler, Linda. I did not want to be Mrs. Colin. In Shepard, Deborah. Between the Lives: Partners in Art. Auckland University Press.
- Chitham, K; Gordon-Smith, I; Oberg, S; Tonga, A; Tyler, LR, eds. (6 March 2015). Black Bird: Lonnie Hutchinson 1997-2013. Centre for Art Studies. pp. 1–32.
- Hope, G; Tyler, L, eds. (1 January 2008). Gabrielle Hope 1916-1962. Auckland: Centre for New Zealand Art Research and Discovery. pp. 47 pages.
- Tyler, LR (19 November 2016). A Table of one's own: The creative life of Anne McCahon. McCahon House Trust. pp. 72 pages.
- "Art historian Linda Tyler explains why Three Sisters is her favourite artwork - The University of Auckland". www.auckland.ac.nz.
- "Linda Tyler unpacks a Serene Timoteo artwork - The University of Auckland". www.auckland.ac.nz.
- "Rosalie Gascoigne: an inspiration to late bloomers - The University of Auckland". www.auckland.ac.nz.
- Tyler, Linda, ed. (2026). Stringer: the art of Terry Stringer. Massey University Press. ISBN 9781991309259.
