= Liyen Chong =

New Zealand artist

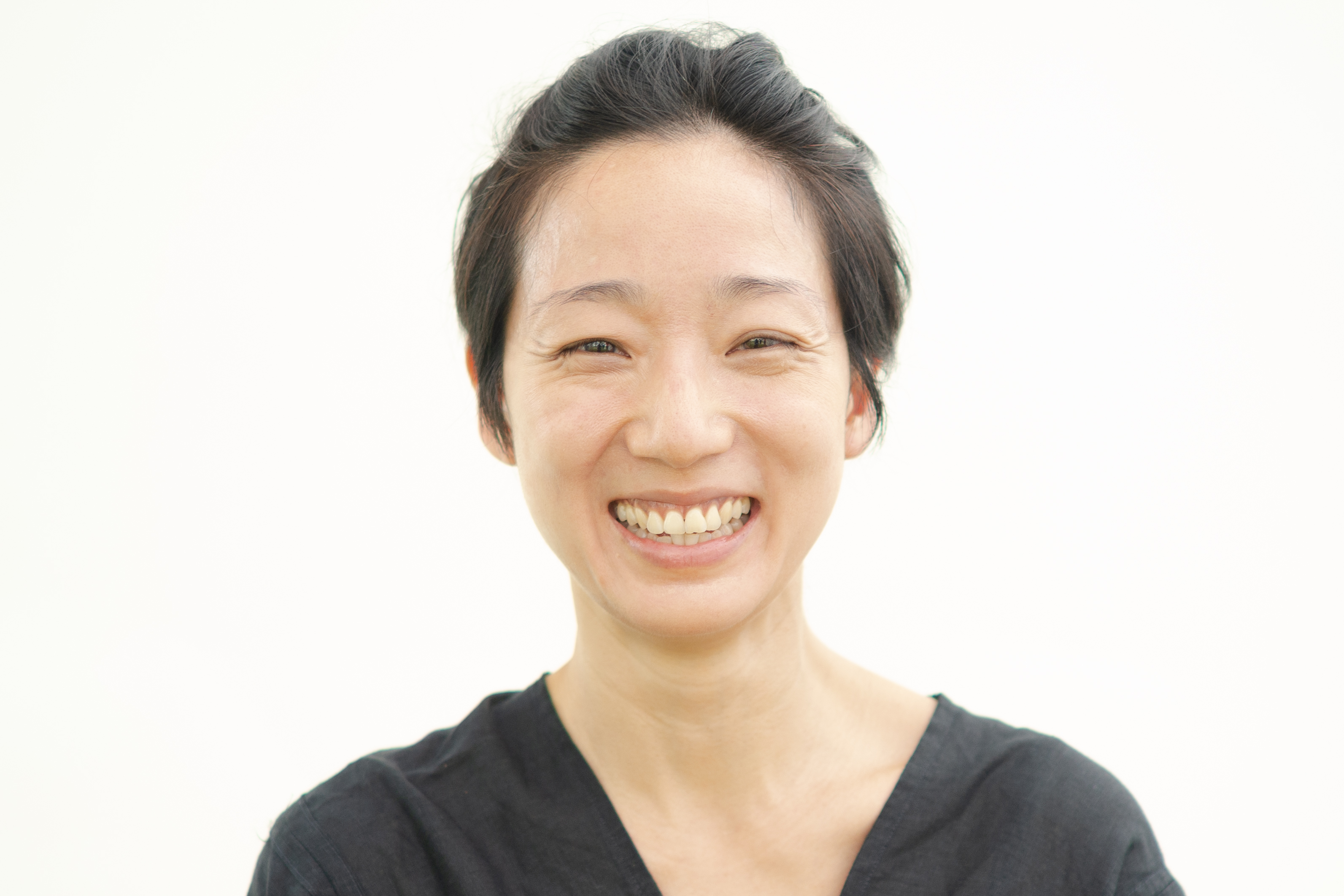
- Artist Liyen Chong at Black Lunch Table + Project Row Houses Juneteenth Photobooth, 2021
- Website: https://liyenchong.com/

Liyen Chong (born 1979) is a New Zealand artist of Chinese-Malaysian descent. Her work is held in the permanent collections of the Christchurch Art Gallery, the University of Canterbury and the National Gallery of Australia.

== Biography ==
Chong grew up in Malaysia and China, and migrated to New Zealand in her mid-teens. She completed a master's degree in fine arts at the University of Canterbury School of Fine Arts in Christchurch in 2003. In 2005, she moved to Auckland.

In 2011, Chong was awarded the McCahon House Artist's Residency and was artist in residence at McCahon House in Titirangi, Auckland and Tylee Cottage, Whanganui. In 2012 and 2015, she received Asia New Zealand Foundation residencies at the Goyang Art Studio in Seoul, South Korea, and Cemeti Art House in Yogyakarta, Indonesia, respectively.

Chong has become known for her detailed embroidered "drawings" that use human hair as thread; she also works with painted ceramics and prints.
