= Don Peebles =

New Zealand artist (1922–2010)

Donald Clendon Peebles ONZM (5 March 1922 – 27 March 2010) was a New Zealand artist. He is regarded as a pioneer of abstract art in New Zealand, and his works are held in the collections of Auckland Art Gallery Toi o Tāmaki, the Museum of New Zealand Te Papa Tongarewa, and Christchurch Art Gallery.

== Early life ==
Peebles was born in Taneatua, Bay of Plenty, in 1922. His family moved to Wellington two years later, and he attended Wadestown Primary School and Wellington College. At age 15, he left school to work as a telegram boy for the New Zealand Post Office. In 1941, he joined the New Zealand Army, and during World War II he served in the New Zealand Division as a radio operator between 1943 and 1945. At the end of the war he had his first formal art training in Florence while waiting to be demobilised.

== Education ==
Peebles began his training in fine art at the Wellington Technical College of Art in 1947, before moving to Australia and studying under John Passmore at the Julian Ashton Art School in Sydney from 1951 to 1953.

== Career ==
In the early 1950s, Peebles returned from studying in Australia and moved back to New Zealand. In 1960, he won a scholarship to study in London, granted by the Association of New Zealand Art Societies. Prior to this trip, Peebles married Prue Corkill. It was in London that Peebles met constructivist painter Victor Pasmore, who became a friend and major influence.

In 1964, Peebles became a lecturer at the Canterbury School of Fine Arts in Christchurch. In 1980, he was made head of the painting department, and he lectured there until his retirement in 1986 to concentrate on painting full-time.

== Exhibitions ==
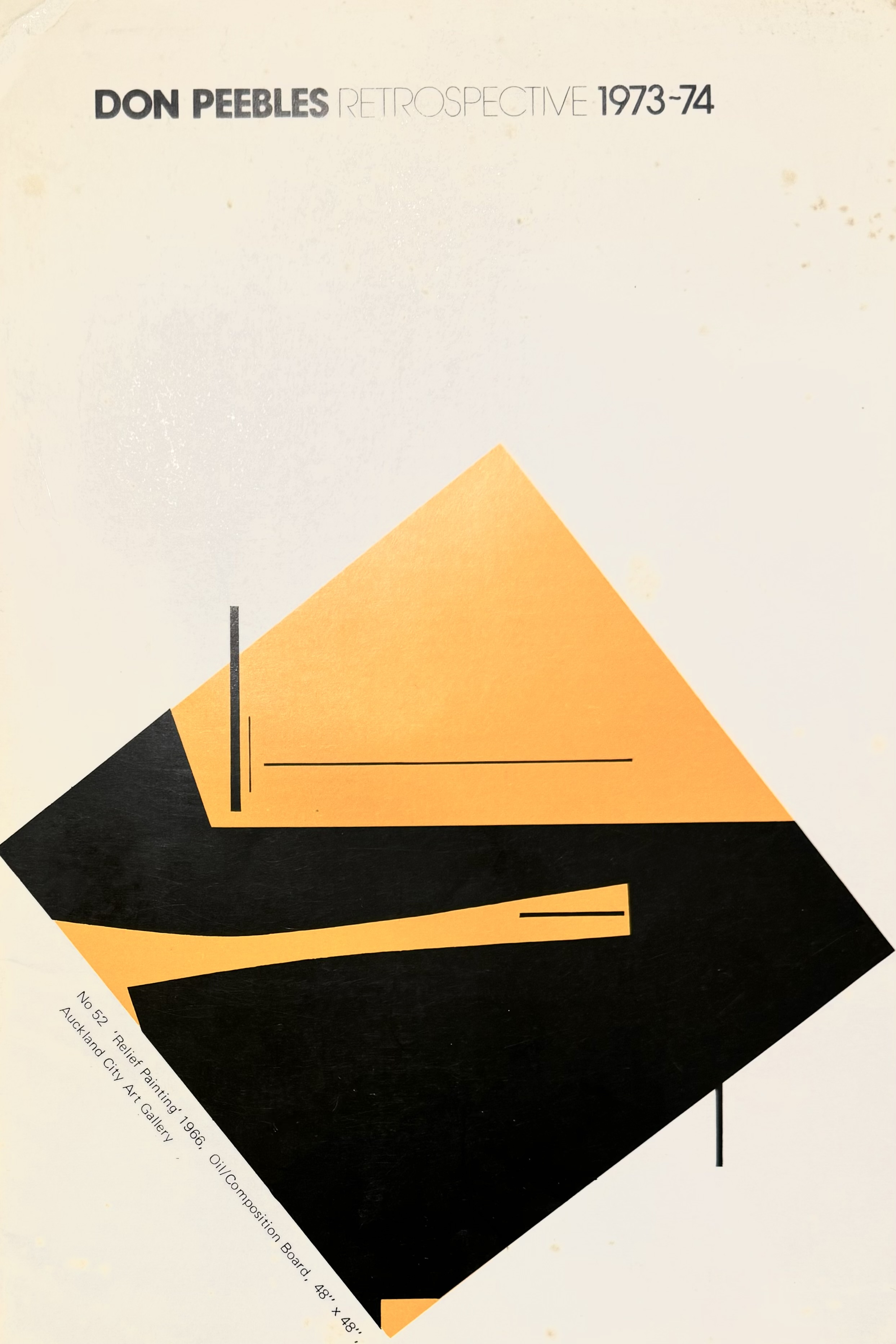
Dowse Art Gallery catalogue, 1973

Peebles has exhibited in both solo and group exhibitions, including:

=== Solo ===
- Don Peebles Retrospective Dowse Art Gallery, Lower Hutt in 1973.
- Don Peebles: Recent Work Robert McDougal Art Gallery, Christchurch in 1979.
- Don Peebles: Drawings of the Eighties Robert McDougal Art Gallery, Christchurch in 1988.
- The Harmony of Opposites Robert McDougall Art Gallery a major retrospective exhibition which toured New Zealand from 1996.
- Don Peebles at 83 at Campbell Grant Galleries, Christchurch in 2005.

=== Group ===
- Five Wellington Painters Auckland Art Gallery. The other painters were Brian Carmody, Melvin Day, John Pine Snadden and Pat Williams. Toured from 1959.
- Contemporary Painting and Sculpture Auckland Art Gallery in 1960.
- Painting from the Pacific Auckland Art Gallery in 1961.
- Contemporary New Zealand Painting Auckland Art Gallery in 1964.
- New Zealand Academy of Fine Arts Special Exhibition for 1969: Five Guest Artists (with Melvin Day, John Drawbridge, Pat Hanly and Ralph Hotere) at the New Zealand Academy of Fine Arts, Wellington in 1969.
- Ten Big Paintings at the Auckland Art Gallery in 1971.
- Recent Painting in Canterbury Robert McDougal art Gallery, Christchurch in 1971.
- The Grid, Lattice and Network: Aspects of Recent New Zealand Art Auckland Art Gallery in 1983.
- Pieces of Eight, an exhibition that highlighted the work of eight influential New Zealand abstract artists, at Dunedin Public Art Gallery in 2010.

== Honours and awards ==
In the 1999 New Year Honours, Peebles was appointed an Officer of the New Zealand Order of Merit, for services to art. In 2003, Peebles received an honorary Doctorate in Literature from the University of Canterbury. In 2007, Peebles received an Arts Foundation Icon Award, awarded to only 20 living people at any one time.

== Death ==
Peebles died of cancer in Christchurch in 2010, and was survived by his wife Prue and their three children.
