= Patrick Hayman =

English painter

Patrick Hayman (1915–1988) was an English artist who worked in a variety of media including painting, drawing and three-dimensional constructions as well as poetry. Although he only lived in Cornwall for a few years, he was closely associated with the St Ives School of painters and sculptors.

== Early years and influences in New Zealand ==
Born in London in 1915, Hayman moved to New Zealand in 1936. Hayman acknowledged he was inspired to paint by Robert Nettleton Field (1899–1987), a teacher at the Dunedin School of Art in Dunedin, New Zealand, where Hayman went to live as a young man. He mingled there in the 1930s with a group of young artists who developed New Zealand's first indigenous Modernism. Notable in that group was Colin McCahon (1919–1987) who stayed in contact with Hayman and like him used texts as sources for his imagery.

A daughter, Christina Conrad, was born in New Zealand in 1942. Also an artist as well as a filmmaker and poet, her paintings and clay icons were created without her having knowledge of her real father, but nevertheless bear a striking resemblance, aesthetically and in terms of social concerns, to a lot of her father's work. She is well known in New Zealand, Australia and the United States where she has exhibited widely in and around New York, including the Outsider Art Fair and the Kleinart Gallery in Woodstock.

== St.Ives, Cornwall ==
Hayman returned to England in 1947 and became part of the burgeoning post-War art scene in Cornwall. From 1958 to 1963 he edited The Painter and Sculptor, a quarterly magazine of the arts that fervently promoted humanistic figurative art. During the 1960s he also taught at the Falmouth School of Art and then at the Croydon School of Art.
