= Northland Panels =

Landscape painting by Colin McCahon

Northland Panels is an eight-part landscape painted by the New Zealand artist Colin McCahon in November 1958 shortly after his first and only trip to the United States.

== Genesis ==
In April 1958, Colin McCahon and his wife Anne traveled to the United States. At the time McCahon was working at the Auckland City Art Gallery (now known as Auckland Art Gallery Toi o Tāmaki) as Keeper of Collections and the main purpose of the trip was to look at how public art galleries operated. During the visit, however, he was also able to see major works of art by American artists for the first time. He was particularly impressed by large scale works by Richard Diebenkorn and Jackson Pollock and also saw Picasso's large-scale painting Guernica.

On his return to New Zealand in July, McCahon at first found the close damp bush surrounding the family home in Titirangi to be oppressive but he then began to work outside on the deck of the house. Here he painted a very large work on long strips of canvas inspired by the rugged landscape of Northland that he titled Northland Panels.

McCahon had been attracted to the Northland landscape for some time and the family had friends in the area. Much later in 1977 he attempted to articulate his attraction to this place, ‘The real Far North of New Zealand is unlike any other part of the land. I can’t talk about it. I love it too much.’

Northland Panels was unusual for that time in New Zealand by reason of both its size and its presentation. The completed work was intended to be shown unframed with the paintings hung loose like banners side-by-side. In addition to the Japanese artist Tomioka Tessai and the German Gerhard Richter, it has been suggested that the hanging banners were influenced by the American installation artist Allan Kaprow. During his US trip in 1958 McCahon had visited an exhibition by Kaprow where the work was hung in strips from the ceiling and he later visited Kaprow's studio.

== Materials ==
McCahon used a housepaint called Monocoat to paint Northland Panels. The paint was not designed for use on loose canvas and hardened making the surface unstable. In 2014 a team of conservators at the Auckland Art Gallery Toi o Tāmaki stabilised the eight panels using an adhesive derived from a Japanese red algae called JunFunori.

== The Panels ==
1) Black and White. While in the United States McCahon saw examples of Rothko's paintings which the art historian Francis Pound claimed was reflected in this panel which is half black and half white.

2) Red Clay Landscape.

3) Manuka and Red Clay Landscape. Mānuka or kahikātoa (Leptospermum scoparium) is a native shrub of New Zealand. Captain Cook called it Tea tree. Until recently it was considered to be of little value or interest. This attitude is reflected in McCahon's inscription on panel 5, ‘a landscape with too few lovers.’

4) Rain.

5) A landscape with too few lovers.

6) Tui. The tūī (Prosthemadera novaeseelandiae) is a New Zealand blue, green and bronze bird with a white tuft of feathers at its neck and a very distinctive call. In Māori the words Korokoro tūī means sweet melodious voice.

7) Landscape with White Road.

8) It can be dark here and manuka in bloom may breed despair.

McCahon painted Northland Panels on the backs of other paintings which were visible when the work was free-hung in the exhibition Détour by Michael Parekowhai.

The verso of A Landscape with too Few Lovers begins with the words, 'the deed has no function apart from the doer, the doer has no function apart from the deed’.

== Purchase ==
The scale of Northland Panels (1.2 x 5.6 meters) made it challenging to find a private buyer and moreover McCahon himself had made it clear that he only wanted the painting to be sold to a public collection.

Northland Panels was offered to the National Art Gallery (now known as Te Papa Tongarewa) twice, once in 1968 for $3,000 and again in 1977. In May 1978 the National Art Gallery finally agreed to purchase the work from McCahon's Wellington dealer Peter McLeavey for $25,000. The Board of the Gallery did have some reservations as the price represented around two years of acquisitions budget. In the end, however, the painting was purchased through the Ellen Eames Collection fund assisted by the New Zealand Lottery Board.

== Controversy ==
In 1998 the Museum of New Zealand Te Papa Tongarewa opened in Wellington taking on the role of both National Art Gallery and Dominion Museum. This combined institution attempted a mix of both social history and art in its displays on opening in the exhibition Parade curated by Ian Wedde. Here McCahon's Northland Panels was shown alongside a television set and a refrigerator based on the fact that all three were of the same era. As Te Papa put it, ‘Parade put these objects beside each other and stirred up the debate, encouraged connections, tickled your fancy.’

The juxtaposition was poorly received. Academic Denis Dutton responded, ‘knowing that they are from the late 1950s is as significant as learning that Lord Rutherford and Mae West were both Virgos’ and the English cultural critic Theodore Dalrymple described it as ‘the institutional exemplar of the lowest common denominator turned into official cultural policy’. The criticism prompted Prime Minister and Minister of the Arts Helen Clark to commission a review of the institution and art exhibitions like Parade were discontinued.

== Exhibition history ==
Note that the painting's fragility has made its inclusion in exhibitions increasingly rare. Selected exhibitions that included Northland Panels

=== 1959 ===
- Three Abstract Painters: Louise Henderson, Kase Jackson, Colin McCahon Auckland City Art Gallery Following the Auckland exhibition the panels went on display in Hamilton at Paul's Book Arcade which was owned by Blackwood Paul and his wife the painter Janet Paul.
- Colin McCahon Recent Paintings, 6 November 1959 - August 1959, Gallery 91, Christchurch.

=== 1968 ===
- Ten Years of New Zealand Painting in Auckland 1958-1959, Auckland City Art Gallery.
- The Northland Panels, Peter McLeavey Gallery, Wellington.

=== 1972 ===
- Colin McCahon Survey Exhibition, Auckland City Art Gallery and national tour. The catalogue for this first survey exhibition included extensive commentary by McCahon himself on many of the works in the exhibition.

=== 1983 ===
- Colin McCahon: Mystical Landscapes, National Art Gallery, Wellington.

=== 1988 ===
- Colin McCahon: Gates and Journeys, Auckland City Art Gallery and national tour. The instability of the painting's surface meant Northland Panels was only included in the Auckland and Wellington venues of the tour.

=== 2014 ===
- Modern Paints Aotearoa, Auckland Art Gallery Toi o Tāmaki.

=== 2017 ===
- Détour, Museum of New Zealand Te Papa Tongarewa, curated by artist Michael Parekowhai.
