= Prahran campus of Melbourne Polytechnic =

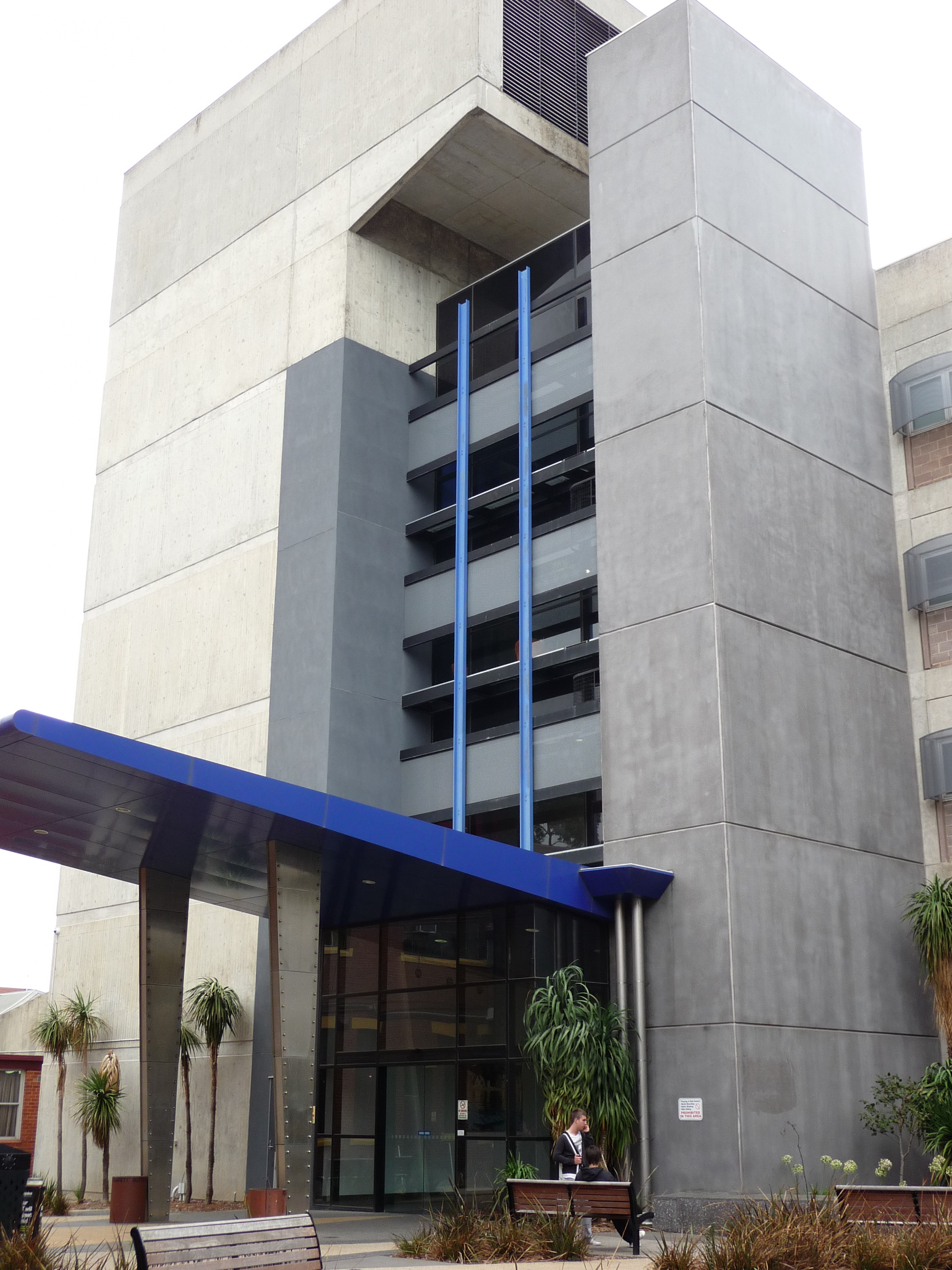
Prahran campus buildings

Prahran Campus of Melbourne Polytechnic was established in 2013 as a hybrid educational organisation developed and administered by Melbourne Polytechnic when it was known as Northern Melbourne Institute of TAFE (NMIT), offering vocational education courses encompassing Certificate, Diploma, Advanced Diploma levels and Bachelor degrees at Prahran campus.

In October 2014 NMIT decided to reposition itself in the tertiary education market under the Melbourne Polytechnic brand, appointing Publicis Mojo to co-ordinate the change. The change was facilitated by a $19 million grant from the Victorian Government, with the Prahran campus and courses being incorporated within the larger organisation.

Bachelor degrees in Business, Hospitality Management, Information Technology, and Writing and Publishing were initially offered by Melbourne Polytechnic from the campus. Further degree courses were envisaged to be developed through a partnership between La Trobe University and NMIT, with the first degree being the Bachelor of Agriculture and Technology based at Epping Campus.

== Establishment ==
Original logo for Melbourne Polytechnic at Prahran

The Melbourne Polytechnic partnership was announced in August 2013, and is one of several Polytechnic partnerships in Australia between established universities and TAFE colleges.

In 2013 NMIT negotiated the purchase of the Prahan campus of Swinburne University of Technology. Melbourne Polytechnic is based at the Prahan campus and has a special emphasis offering courses in the Creative arts industry.

== Courses ==
=== Higher education ===
Melbourne Polytechnic initially offered in 2014 a number of existing bachelor's degree courses at the Prahran campus in Business, Hospitality Management, Information Technology, and Writing and Publishing, as well as the Higher Education Diploma of Tertiary Studies.

The first higher education course developed and delivered by Melbourne Polytechnic is the Bachelor of Agriculture and Technology, which is taught at Melbourne Polytechnic's Yan Yean farm and Epping campus. Graduates will have their degree conferred by La Trobe University.

=== Vocational education ===
Initial VET courses being offered in 2014 include in the areas of Accounting, Beauty Therapy, Community Services Work, Cooking and Patisserie, Costume for Performance, Digital Media, Events, Graphic Design, Hospitality, International Business, Information Technology, Interior Design and Decoration, Justice, Live Production and Theatre Arts, Music and Music Business, Photography, Writing, Sound Production, Specialist Make-Up services, Travel and Tourism, Visual Arts, Visual Merchandising.
