= Ava Seymour =

New Zealand artist (born 1967)

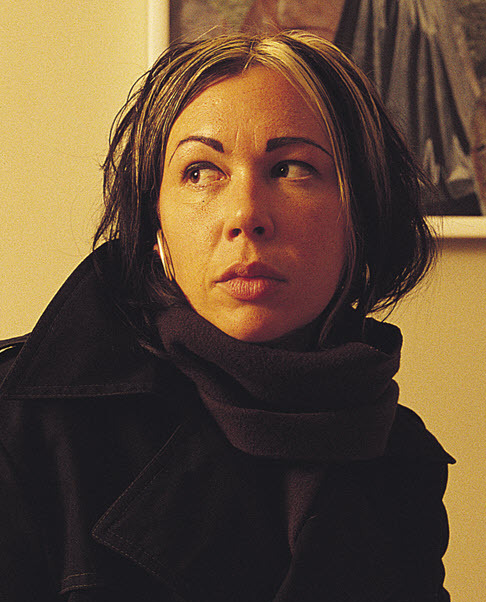
- Seymour in 2001
- Born: 1967 (age 58–59); Palmerston North, New Zealand
- Education: Northern Melbourne Institute of TAFE
- Known for: Photocollage
- Website: Official website

Ava Seymour (born 1967) is a New Zealand artist known for her photocollages.

== Biography ==
Seymour was born in Palmerston North in 1967. She attended the Northern Melbourne Institute of TAFE in Prahran in 1988. Seymour was based in Berlin for two years, where she began producing her photocollages. She returned to New Zealand in 1994 and had her first exhibition in 1995. In 2001, Seymour was appointed a Frances Hodgkins Fellow. During this fellowship, she focused on Central Otago imagery. In 2009, Seymour received a McCahon House artist residency, during which she developed work that was included in The Kauri Project: A Delicate Balance at Te Uru Waitākere Contemporary Gallery in April 2015.

Seymour's "Health, Happiness and Housing" is a suite of 15 photographic montages of New Zealanders and their state housing, described as a "perceptive and astringent portrait of New Zealand" by Ron Brownson. It was exhibited at Artspace NZ in Auckland and The Physics Room in Christchurch in 1997 and 1998, and was subsequently acquired by Auckland Art Gallery.

Seymour's work is included in the collections of Auckland Art Gallery, Te Papa Tongarewa, the National Gallery of Australia, the National Gallery of Victoria, and Queensland Art Gallery.
