= Eve Armstrong =

New Zealand artist

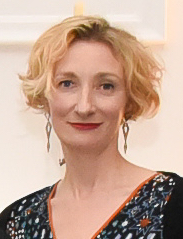
Armstrong in 2019

Eve Armstrong (born 1978) is a New Zealand artist. She uses everyday found objects and arranges them into sculptural collages.

== Early life ==
Eve Armstrong, an artist, (born 1978) was raised in Upper Hutt, Wellington. Armstrong worked as assistant editor on the teen and children's pages for the Evening Post, Wellington, then studied textiles in Nelson. She studied fine arts at Elam School of Fine Arts in Auckland, graduating in 2003.

== Education ==
Armstrong went to Nelson Marlborough Institute of Technology, Nelson, New Zealand from 1999 through 2001 and received a Diploma in Visual Arts.

Armstrong graduated in 2003 with A Bachelor of Fine Arts Diploma from Elam School of Fine Arts, The University of Auckland in New Zealand.

Right out of college in 2003 Armstrong received the Senior Scholarship in Fine Arts, from Elam School of Fine Arts, University of Auckland, New Zealand.

== Career ==
Armstrong was one of the 2006 recipients of the Arts Foundation of New Zealand New Generation Award. Armstrong wrote the book in 2007, How to Hold A Trading Table: A Manual for Beginners. In 2008 Armstrong was selected for an Asia New Zealand Foundation artist residence in Hong Kong, where she spent a month working with a group of 7 artists. Armstrong was an artist-in-residency at the McCahon House in Auckland between March and June of 2009.

Armstrong was a resident at the Dunedin Public Art Gallery Visiting Artist Programme during the "summer of 2016-17." She exhibited a monumental installation called China and Hardware which was made during this residence at the gallery in 2017.

== Exhibits ==
2017

- Growing Demand (solo) at the Dunedin Public Art Gallery, Dunedin

2016

- Trading Table (solo) at Michael Lett, Auckland Art Fair

2013

- Rise (solo) at The Dowse Art Museum, Lower Hutt
- Eve Armstrong (solo) at 30 Upstairs, Wellington

2012

- Raised Voices (group) at Calder and Lawson Gallery, Hamilton, New Zealand
- Letter to Alice May Williams (group) at Michael Lett, Auckland, New Zealand

2011

- Prospect: New Zealand Art Now (group) at City Gallery Wellington, New Zealand
- Making Arrangements: Eve Armstrong and Gretchen Albrecht (two person) at Michael Lett, Auckland, New Zealand
- Ruby: A Forty Year Love Affair with The Dowse (group) at The Dowse Art Museum, Lower Hutt, New Zealand

2010

- Everything is near and inflorescent, forever and present (group) at Michael Lett, Auckland, New Zealand
- Taking Stock (solo) at Letting Space, Wellington, New Zealand
- The Woods that See and Hear (group) at the Dertien Hectare, The Netherlands
- After (solo) at The Physics Room, Christchurch, New Zealand

2009

- Second Life (group) at the Pataka Museum, Porirua, Wellington and the Sarjeant Gallery, Whanganui, New Zealand
- Turn, Turn, Turn, Govett Brewster Open Window, New Plymouth, New Zealand (solo presentation).
- Outlet, McCahon House, Titirangi, Auckland, New Zealand (solo).
- Mind the Step (group) at 1301PE, Los Angeles, United States of America

2008

- Jacqueline Fraser and Eve Armstrong (two person at Michael Lett, Auckland, New Zealand
- Lost and Found: Tarrawarra Biennial (group) at the Tarrawarra Museum of Art, Australia
- Group Show 1301PE, Los Angeles, United States of America

2007

- Dressed & Shaken (solo) at the Michael Lett, Auckland, New Zealand
- Hunch (group) at Contemporary Projects, City Gallery Wellington, New Zealand
- Turbulence (solo) at the 3rd Auckland Triennial, Auckland, New Zealand
- COMFORT ZONE & Reading Room (group) at Te Tuhi Centre for The Arts, Auckland, New Zealand
- Group Show!, Michael Lett, Auckland, New Zealand (group).
- Michael Lett stand, Auckland Art Fair, Auckland New Zealand (solo project).

2006

- Michael Lett, Wellington, New Zealand (group).
- SLIPs: Small Local Improvement Projects (solo) at Enjoy Public Art Gallery, Wellington, New Zealand
- SCAPE Biennial of Art in Public Space (group) at Christchurch, New Zealand
- A Tale of Two Cities: Busan-Seoul/Seoul-Busan group) at Busan Biennale, Busan, Republic of Korea
- Fifteen People Present Their Favourite Book, Special Gallery, Auckland, New Zealand (group).

2005

- ROAM (solo) at Artspace, Auckland New Zealand
- Likes The Outdoors (group) at the Ramp Gallery, Hamilton, New Zealand

2004

- Duets (group) at the Ramp Gallery, Hamilton, New Zealand
- Book Bonanza, rm103, Auckland New Zealand (solo exhibition).
- Twelve Days of Christmas (group) at Anna Miles Gallery, Auckland, New Zealand
- Artspace Editions, Artspace, Auckland, New Zealand (group).
- The Bed You Lie In (group) at, Artspace, Auckland, New Zealand
- Shop103, Enjoy Public Art Gallery, Wellington, New Zealand (group).
- Relay, Canary Gallery, Auckland New Zealand (group).
- Resistance Through Rituals, Westspace, Melbourne, Australia (group).
- Public/Private, 2nd Auckland Triennial, The Auckland Project with Louisa Bufardeci, George Fraser Gallery, Auckland, New Zealand.
- Ruthless, Anna Miles Gallery, Auckland, New Zealand (group).

2003

- Shop One Zero Three, rm103, Auckland, New Zealand (group).
- Elam Graduate Exhibition, Elam School of Fine Arts, University of Auckland, Auckland, New Zealand (solo project).
- Picture, George Fraser Gallery, Auckland, New Zealand (group).
- Bermuda Triangle, George Fraser Gallery, Auckland, New Zealand (group).
- The Habitat Project, rm 103, Auckland, New Zealand (collaboration with Gaelen McDonald).
- Fast, Elam Sculpture Show, Canterbury Arcade, Auckland, New Zealand (group).
- A4 Work Exchange, curated by Karin Sander, Kunsthochscule Berlin ‘ Weissensee, Berlin, Germany (group).

2002

- Toilet Home, Elam School of Fine Arts, University of Auckland, Auckland, New Zealand, (collaborative project with Gaelen McDonald).
- Tight, Elam Sculpture Show, rm104, Auckland, New Zealand (group).

2000

- The Process of Breaking, Gallery 203, Nelson, New Zealand (solo).

2001

- 911, Elam Sculpture Show, 911 Dominion Road, Auckland, New Zealand (group).
