= Bepen Bhana =

Indian-New Zealand artist (1971–2023)

- Born: 1971; Auckland, New Zealand
- Died: 2023 (aged 51–52); Auckland
- Education: Elam School of Fine Arts
- Known for: Photorealistic painting
- Notable work: The Curry Bunch, Boom! Boom! Deluxe, Frankie Goes to Bollywood

Bepen Bhana (1971–2023) was an Indian-New Zealand visual artist and graphic designer, known for his photorealistic painting and examination of cultural appropriation in mass media.

== Biography ==
Bhana was born in Auckland in 1971, his father having migrated to New Zealand in 1949. At home the family spoke Gujarati and decorated the house with Hindu deities, and Bhana learned English by watching television.

He studied at Elam School of Fine Arts gaining a doctorate, and taught at Manukau Institute of Technology and Whitecliffe College of Arts and Design.

In 2016 Bhana held the Parehuia McCahon House Artists' Residency, where he created the works in his Frankie goes to Bollywood series.

He died in Auckland in 2023 at age 51 while working on a second doctorate studying Sajid Khan.

== Art practice ==
Bhana's work used humorous references to popular, often nostalgic, culture to explore exoticisation and commodification of South Asian aesthetics and traditions.

Figures represented in his work included Basil Brush in 2012's Boom! Boom! Deluxe and The Brady Bunch in 2016's The Curry Bunch. Bhana responded to Beyoncé's appropriation of Hindi bridal fashion in Coldplay's video for "Hymn for the weekend" with the exhibition Hey Bey.

Postcards from the edge (2013) and Frankie goes to Bollywood (2016) used the techniques and subjects of Bollywood painted billboard advertising, combining them with New Zealand landscapes, first at postcard size and then as large-scale diptychs.

In Frankie goes to Bollywood the paintings have titles in Te Reo Māori and Hindi, avoiding English and prioritising audiences familiar with the actors or landscapes depicted. Balamohan Shingade suggests that the paintings push past the goal of representation in Western media, instead showing that "Indians already set their own standards and ideals, and inspire their own audiences". Ruth De Souza describes them as a necessary interrogation of the neoliberal Tourism New Zealand depiction of India.
