= Judy Millar =

New Zealand artist (born 1957)

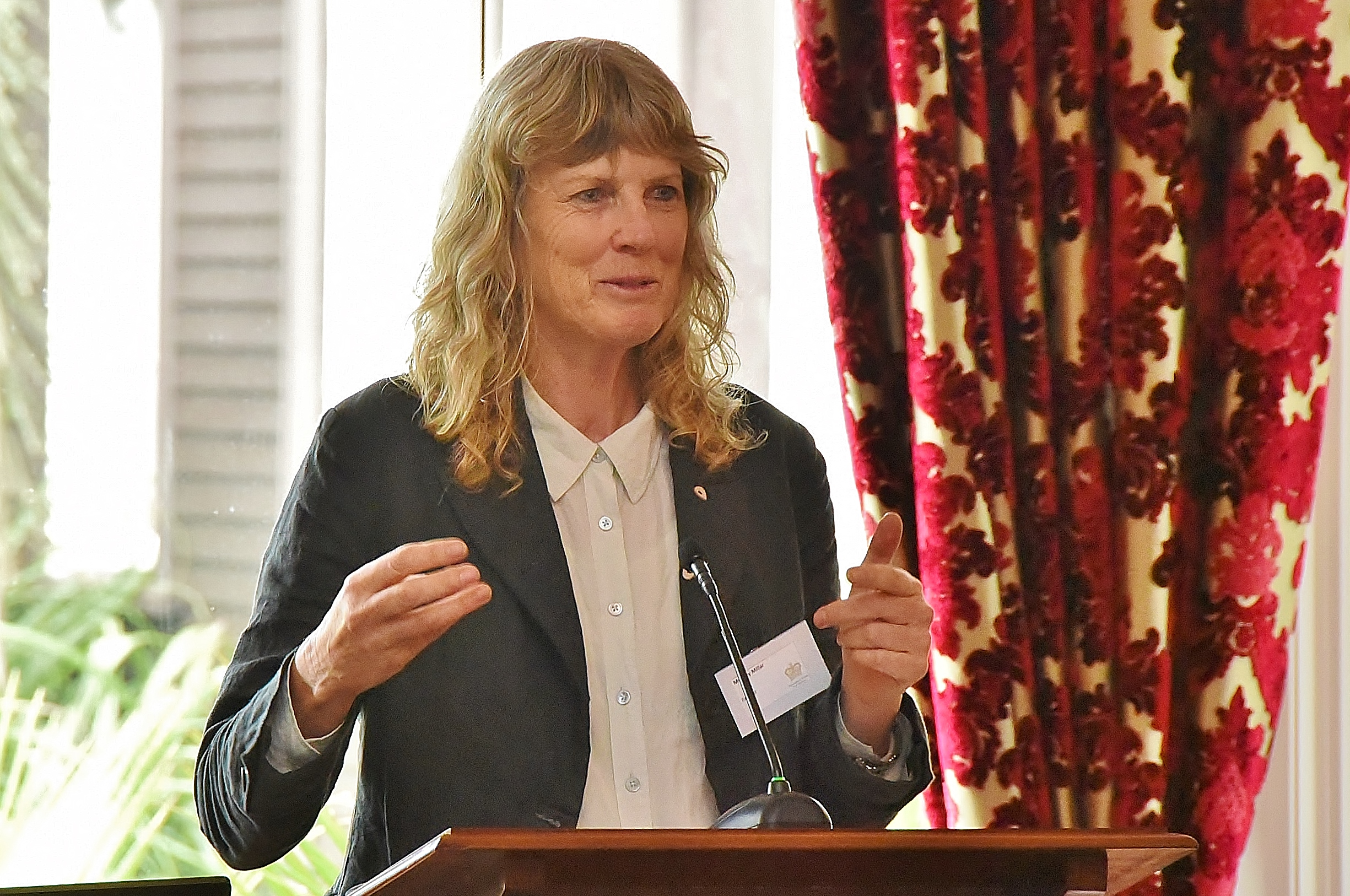
- Millar at the Venice Biennale Youth Forum in 2017
- Born: 1957 (age 68–69)
- Education: 1983.MFA Auckland University's Elam School of Fine Arts
- Awards: 1990 Italian Government Post-Graduate Scholarship, Accademia Albertina delle Belle Arti, Turin, Italy. 1994 Moet & Chandon Fellowship, Avize. 2002 Paramount Award, Wallace Art Awards, New Zealand
- Website: www.judymillar.com

Penelope Judith Millar (born 1957) is a New Zealand artist, who lives in Auckland, New Zealand and Berlin, Germany.

== Education ==
Millar received a BFA in 1980 and an MFA from Auckland University's Elam School of Fine Arts in 1983, where she later became a professor. As recipient of a Scholarship from the Italian Government in 1990, she spent a year in Turin, Italy, where she studied Italian arts of the 1960s and 1970s.

== Paintings ==
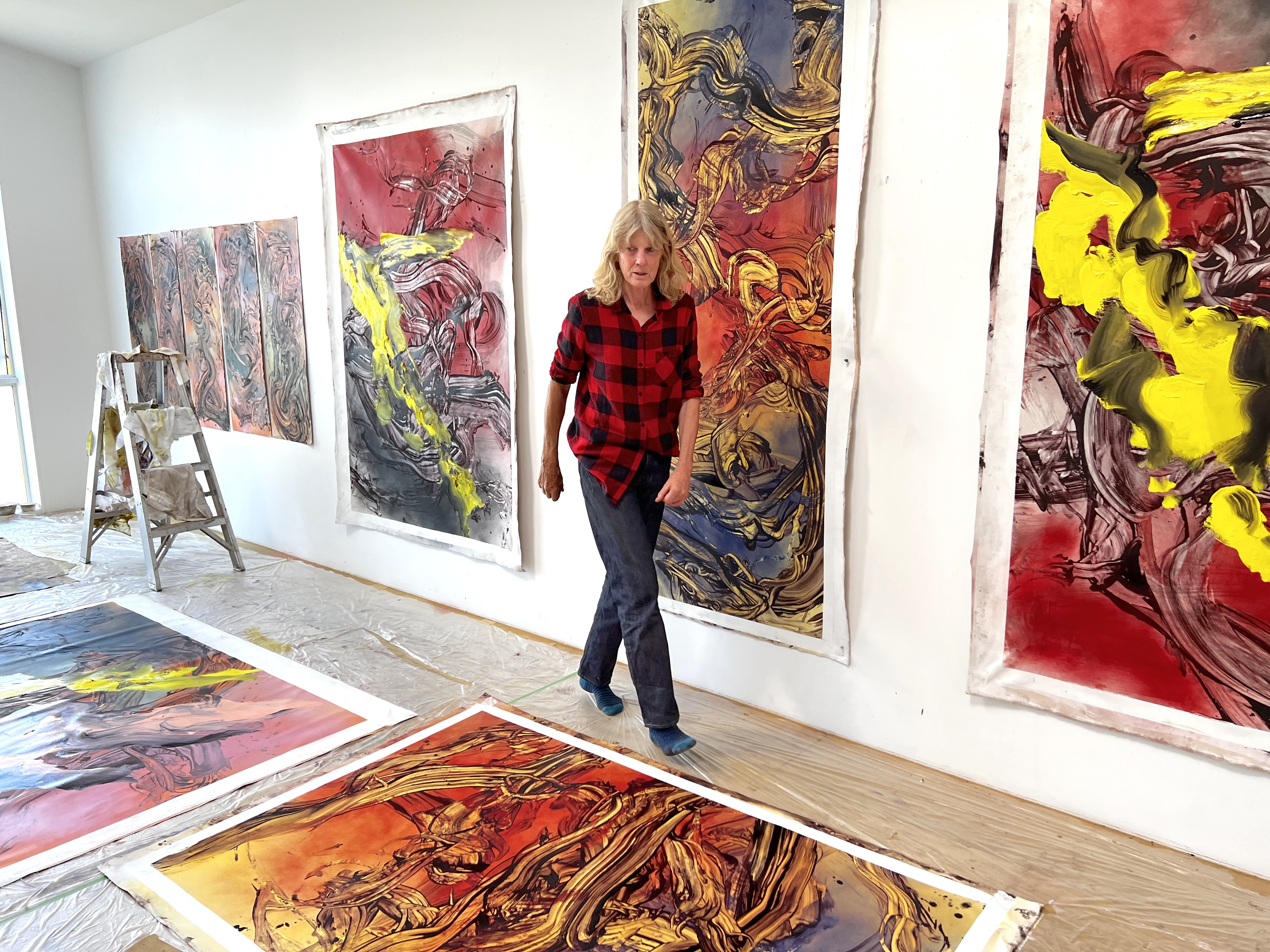
Judy Millar in her Anawhata studio, 2022

Millar is known for her abstract acrylic and oil paintings. While her works may recall Abstract Expressionist paintings, Millar does not consider her paintings as being 'gestural'. In an interview with Ocula in 2016, she said that,

The word that always sets my teeth on edge is ‘gesture.’ Gesture seems like something that comes gushing out from deep inside you. That is not really what I am interested in. My work is much more about drawing; it is about looking and seeing, less about ‘expressing’. I'm using gesture only in the sense that a gesture can communicate something.

== Awards and honours ==
- 2011 Arts Board Arts Grant, Creative New Zealand
- 2002 Paramount Award, Wallace Art Awards, New Zealand
- 1994 Moet & Chandon Fellowship, Avize
- 1990 Italian Government Post-Graduate Scholarship, Accademia Albertina delle Belle Arti, Turin, Italy

== Residencies ==
- 2009 Creative New Zealand Visual Arts Residency in New York, International Studio & Curatorial Program (ISCP), New York City
- 2006 Inaugural winner of the McCahon House Residency, New Zealand

== Exhibitions ==
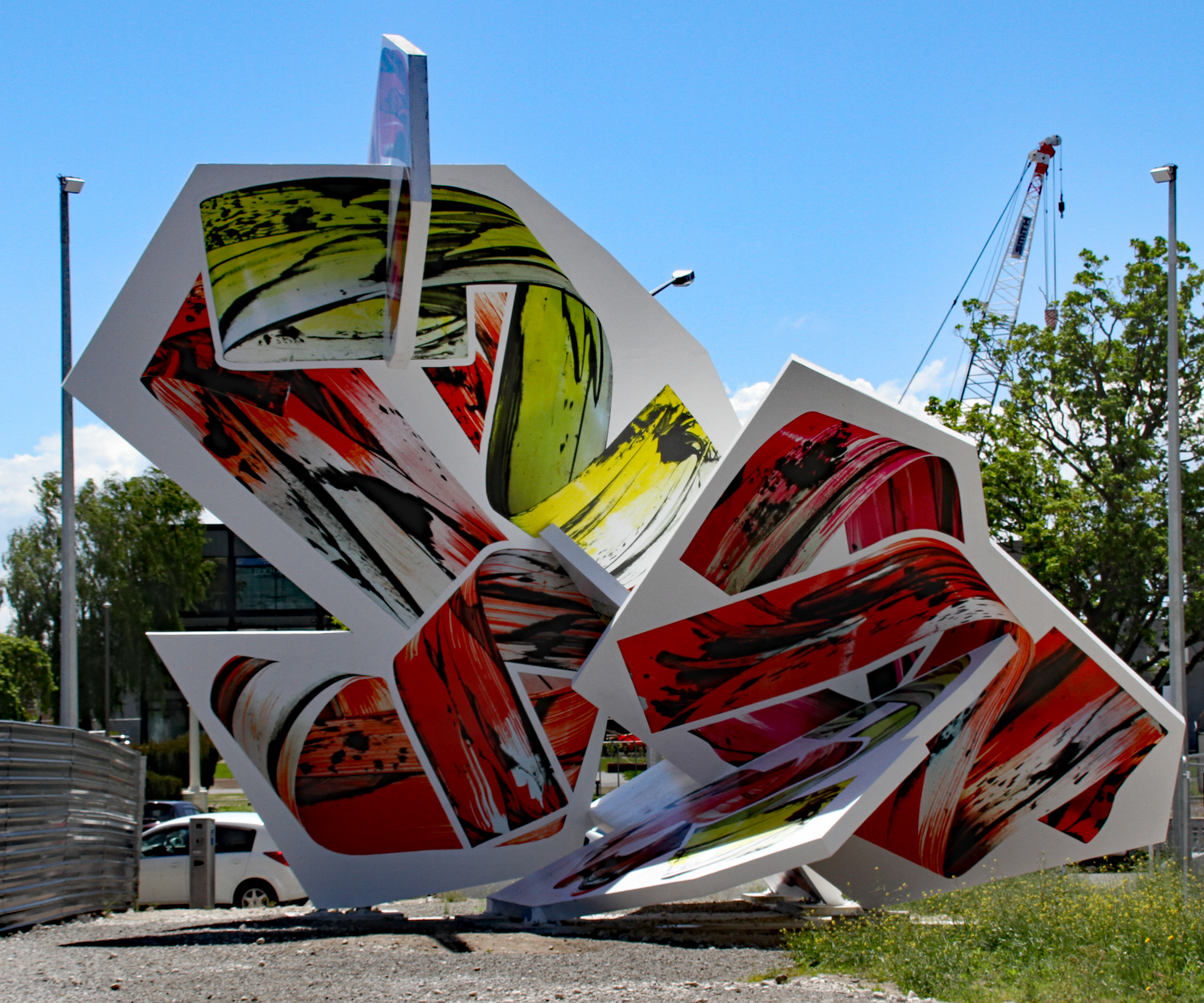
Millar's work 'Call me Snake' in Christchurch in 2016. It was installed in 2015 and demolished in 2022.

Millar has had numerous solo and group exhibitions in both New Zealand and Europe and found critical acclaim in the international press.

Selected Solo Exhibitions

- 2005 I ~~Will, Should, Can, Must, May,~~ Would Like to Express, Auckland Art Gallery, Auckland
- 2006 Something, Nothing, 64zero3, Christchurch
- 2007 Keeping You You, Keeping Me Me, Lopdell House Gallery, Titirangi, West Auckland
- 2008 Matt Black, Galerie Mark Müller, Zurich, Switzerland
- 2009 Giraffe-Bottle-Gun, New Zealand Pavilion, Venice Biennale, Venice, Italy
- 2015 The Model World, Te Uru Waitakere Contemporary Gallery

Her painterly style was described as "energetic and overwhelming", and Andrea Hilgenstock calls her paintings "spectacular". Further references can be found in recent publications on New Zealand art.

Her works can be found in the collections of the Kunstmuseum St. Gallen, Dunedin Public Art Gallery the Auckland Art Gallery, the Museum of New Zealand Te Papa Tongarewa, Christchurch Art Gallery, and numerous private collections throughout Europe.

She represented New Zealand at the 53rd Venice Biennial in 2009. This project is recreated in miniature in the 2014 pop-up book Swell, created in collaboration with paper engineer Phillip Fickling and writer Trish Gribben – this book in turn inspired full-scale pop-up style works for her solo exhibition The Model World and large sculptures for SCAPE and the Auckland Art Gallery.

In 2011 she was again part of the Venice Biennale in the collateral event Personal Structures in Palazzo Bembo.

== Current ==
Millar is represented by Michael Lett in Auckland, Gallery Mark Müller in Zurich, Hamish Morrison Gallery in Berlin, and Sullivan Strumpf, Sydney.
