= J. D. Charlton Edgar =

New Zealand art teacher, artist, art gallery director (1903–1976)

Charlton Edgar MBE
- Born: James Douglas Charlton Edgar; 22 May 1903; Brantford, Ontario, Canada
- Died: 12 October 1976 (aged 73); Dunedin, New Zealand
- Occupations: Art teacher, artist, art gallery director

James Douglas Charlton Edgar MBE (22 May 1903 – 12 October 1976) was a New Zealand art teacher, artist and art gallery director.

Edgar was born in Brantford, Ontario, Canada, on 22 May 1903. He received his art education at the Edinburgh College of Art. He and his wife emigrated to Dunedin in New Zealand for him to teach at the Dunedin School of Art at King Edward Technical College.

Edgar was director of the Dunedin Public Art Gallery from 1965 until his retirement in 1971. In the 1976 Queen's Birthday Honours, he was appointed a Member of the Order of the British Empire, for services to art. Edgar died a few months later on 12 October 1976, aged 73, in Dunedin.
