= Robert Nettleton Field =

New Zealand artist, sculptor, potter and art teacher

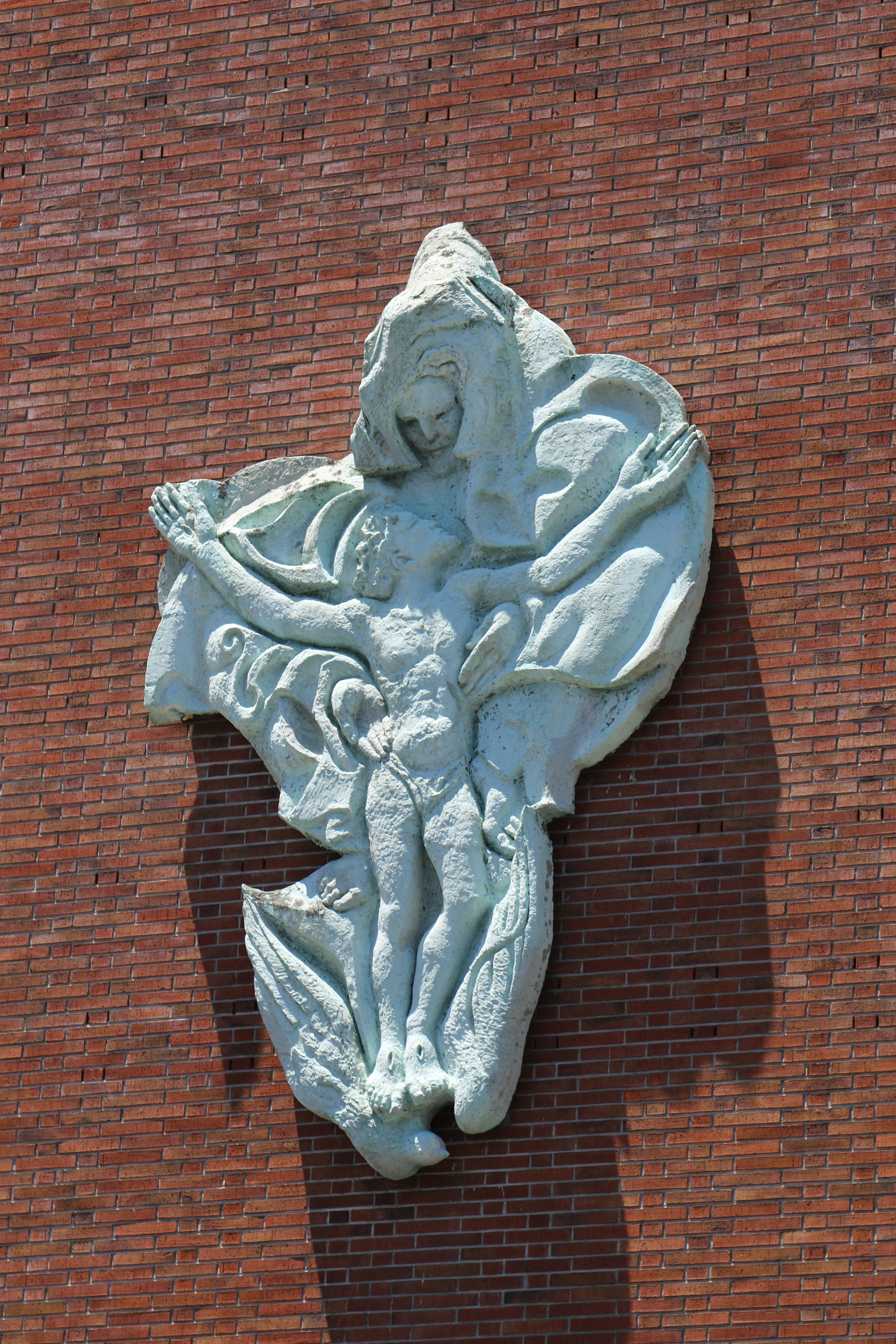
The Holy Spirit, a 1970 bas-relief sculpture by Robert Nettleton Field located at Holy Trinity Cathedral, Auckland

Robert Nettleton Field (3 March 1899–18 February 1987) was a New Zealand artist, sculptor, potter and art teacher. He was born in Bromley, Kent, England on 3 March 1899. Field was described as "a quiet man who has never sought publicity and makes the most modest claims for himself."

== Influence ==
Field was an influential teacher to Colin McCahon who was especially interested in Field's idea of finding one's 'direction' as an artist. McCahon stated, "The painter's life for me was exemplified by the life and work of R.N. Field."
