= Hocken Collections =

Research library in Dunedin, New Zealand

- Uare Taoka o Hākena
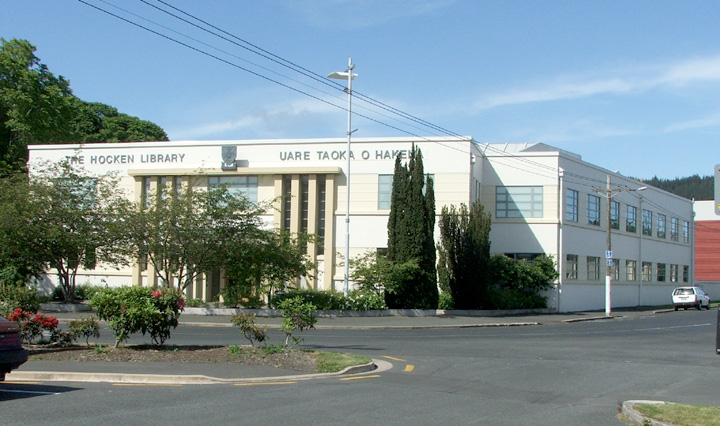
- Hocken Library in 2005, housed in a former cheese-making factory
- 45.86976°S 170.517715°E
- Location: 90 Anzac Avenue, Dunedin 9016, New Zealand
- Type: Research library
- Established: 23 March 1910; 116 years ago

Collection
- Size: Floating

Other information
- Website: Official website

Hocken Collections (Māori: Uare Taoka o Hākena, formerly the Hocken Library) is a research library, historical archive, and art gallery based in Dunedin, New Zealand. Its library collection, which is of national significance, is administered by the University of Otago.

The Collections' specialist areas include items relating to the history of New Zealand and the Pacific, with specific emphasis on the Otago and Southland Regions. Open to the general public, the library is one of the country's most important historical research facilities.

== History ==
Hocken Collections is the result of the philanthropy of avid collector Dr. Thomas Hocken, who donated his private collection to the university in trust for the New Zealand public. Hocken first made public his intention to offer his library to the people of New Zealand in 1897. A deed of gift was signed on 3 September 1907 but it was not until 1910 that it became generally accessible in a purpose built wing of the Otago Museum. Dr. Thomas Hocken was too ill to attend the official opening on 23 March 1910 (the 62nd anniversary of the founding of Dunedin), and died just two months later.

Until 1965 the library was entirely housed in the Otago Museum. From that time its pictures collection and increasingly more of its other holdings were housed on other sites around the University of Otago's campus, the pictures being at the Central Library. In 1980 the collections were again brought together under one roof in the new Hocken Building (now renamed the Richardson Building), designed by E.J. McCoy. It soon outgrew that site and additional accommodation was secured at another site in Leith Street. It was reconsolidated on another site in 1998 in the Art Deco 1951 Otago Co-operative Dairy Company factory on Anzac Avenue, east of the main campus. In 2005, its name was changed to Hocken Collections.

== Collections ==
Hocken Collections holds the largest collection of manuscripts, maps, and early photographs relating to the history of the Otago Region, as well as several notable collections relating to the country as a whole. The latter include the letters and journals of Samuel Marsden and New Zealand records of the Church Missionary Society. The personal and public papers of many important Otago people are also present in the library's collections, including those of the writers James K. Baxter and R. A. K. Mason, as well as the political writings of many of the community's leaders. The library's collection also includes a substantial body of photographic work by the Burton Brothers.

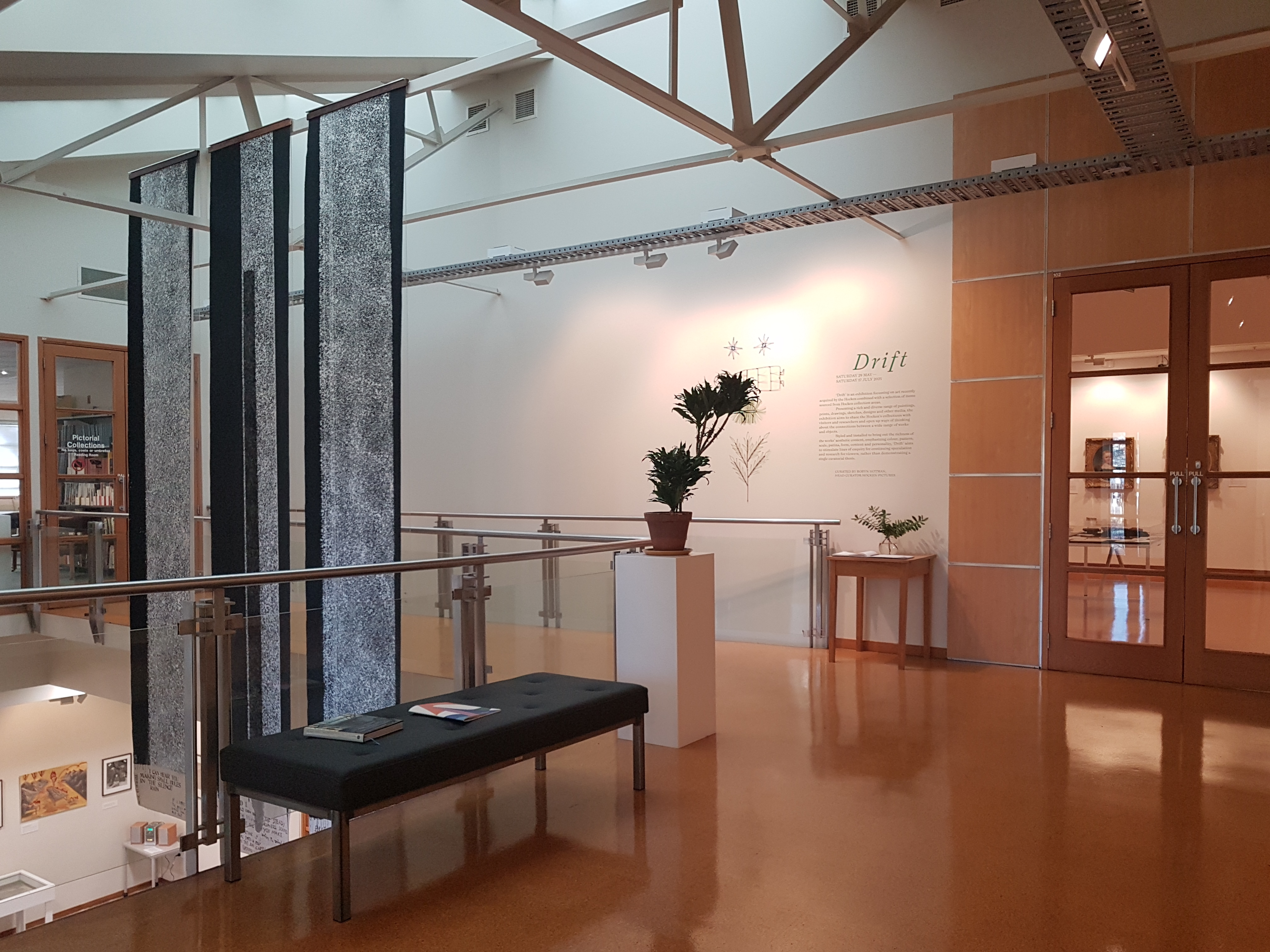
Interior foyer

The library also has an extensive collection of New Zealand music recordings and sheet music—including much related to Dunedin's rock-music scene—and a substantial collection of New Zealand art; the upper floor of the library includes a gallery which is regularly used for shows of art both from the library's collection and from visiting and resident University of Otago artists.

=== Collection highlights ===
The following Hocken Collection's holdings have been recognised as items of recorded heritage which have national significance by UNESCO Memory of the World Aotearoa New Zealand Ngā Mahara o te Ao.

- Charles Brasch Literary and Personal Papers. This collection was included as an entry on the register in 2013.
- Dr Hocken's Church Missionary Society Records in 2014.
- Pickerill Papers on Plastic Surgery in 2015.
- Lance Richdale Papers in 2016.
- Salmond Anderson Architects Records in 2017.
- Herries Beattie Papers (1848–1972) in 2018.
- Dr Muriel Bell Papers in 2019.
- Colin and Anne McCahon Papers in 2020.
- Janet Frame literary and personal papers in 2024.
