= An Angel at My Table =

1990 film by Jane Campion

- Theatrical release poster
- Directed by: Jane Campion
- Screenplay by: Laura Jones
- Based on: To the Is-Land (1982); An Angel at My Table (1984); The Envoy from Mirror City (1984) by Janet Frame
- Produced by: John Maynard; Bridget Ikin
- Starring: Kerry Fox
- Cinematography: Stuart Dryburgh
- Edited by: Veronika Jenet
- Music by: Don McGlashan
- Production companies: ABC; Television New Zealand; Channel 4 Hibiscus Films
- Distributed by: Sharmill Films (Australia); Artificial Eye (United Kingdom)
- Release dates: 5 September 1990 (Venice Film Festival); 20 September 1990 (Australia)
- Running time: 158 minutes
- Countries: New Zealand; Australia; United Kingdom
- Language: English
- Box office: NZ$569,000 (New Zealand) $1,054,638 (US and Canada)

An Angel at My Table is a 1990 biographical drama film directed by Jane Campion. The film is based on Janet Frame's three autobiographies, To the Is-Land (1982), An Angel at My Table (1984), and The Envoy from Mirror City (1984). The film was very well received. It premiered at the 47th Venice International Film Festival, where it was awarded the Grand Jury Prize, before going on to win the International Critics' Award at the Toronto International Film Festival and several awards, including Best Film, at the New Zealand Film and Television awards.

== Plot ==
Janet Frame is born in New Zealand's South Island. During her youth, she develops an affinity for literature, writing poetry and reading Grimms' Fairy Tales. She graduates from primary school and goes to her local athenaeum. During her adolescence, Janet hangs out with her sisters Myrtle and Isabel and their friends Poppy and Marguerite. One afternoon, Janet stays behind while Myrtle goes swimming. That same day, her parents are alerted that Myrtle had drowned. She mourns her sister's death. Experiencing depression, Janet burns pages of her poetry she had written as a child.

As a young adult, Janet has become repressed and introverted. She studies at the university while she and Isabel stay with her Aunt Isy and Uncle George. By 1945, Janet is a teacher in training, but quits her vocation after a visit from an inspector. She obtains a doctor's certificate and works as a nurse, but decides to work as a writer. Sometime later, she attempts suicide after ingesting a pack of aspirin. Her employers give her a leave of rest and Janet is admitted to the psychiatric ward. While under observation, Frame is diagnosed with schizophrenia.

Janet suffers another personal tragedy with the death of her sister Isabel, who drowned in the Picton Harbour. To cope with her sister's death, Janet turns to poetry and is admitted into Sunnyside Hospital, where she receives electroshock therapy. In 1951, while Frame is hospitalised, she publishes her first book, The Lagoon and Other Stories, a volume collection of short poetry. The book is awarded the Hubert Church Memorial Award. She is discharged and briefly stays with author Frank Sargeson. There, her first novel Owls Do Cry is published.

In 1956, Janet leaves New Zealand and arrives in London on a literary grant. She briefly resides in Ibiza, and shares her rental room with Bernhard, an American studying overseas, with whom she starts a romantic relationship. Their romance ends when Bernhard leaves when the summer semester ends. She finds herself pregnant with his child, but suffers a miscarriage. In 1958, she readmits herself into a psychiatric ward under the care of Dr. Cawley. He concludes that Janet was never a schizophrenic, but had suffered from the effects of prolonged hospitalisation. He recommends she write about her experiences, to which Janet promptly writes another successful novel, Faces in the Water. Impressed with her past success, her publisher Mark Goulden suggests that she could write a bestselling book.

Goulden resettles Janet to Knightsbridge, where she meets fellow authors Alan and Ruth Sillitoe. Shortly after, she receives a letter informing her that her father has died. She sails back to New Zealand, is interviewed by a local journalist, and resumes her writing.

== Cast ==
- Kerry Fox as Janet Frame (adult)
  - Alexia Keogh as Janet Frame (child)
  - Karen Fergusson as Janet Frame (teenager)
- Iris Churn as Mother
- Kevin J. Wilson as Father
- Melina Bernecker as Myrtle
- Glynis Angell as Isabel
- Mark Morrison as Bruddie Frame (child)
- Sarah Llewellyn as June Frame (child)
- Natasha Gray as Leslie
- Brenda Kendall as Miss Botting
- Martyn Sanderson as Frank Sargeson

== Awards ==
- New Zealand Film and TV Awards (1990):
  - Best Cinematography: Stuart Dryburgh
  - Best Director: Jane Campion
  - Best Film
  - Best Performance in Supporting Role: Martyn Sanderson
  - Best Female Performance: Kerry Fox
  - Best Screenplay: Laura Jones
- Toronto International Film Festival (1990):
  - International Critics Award: Jane Campion
- Valladolid International Film Festival (1990):
  - Best Actress: Kerry Fox
- Venice Film Festival (1990)
  - Elvira Notari Prize: Jane Campion
  - Filmcritica "Bastone Bianco" Award: Jane Campion
  - Grand Special Jury Prize: Jane Campion
  - Little Golden Lion Award: Jane Campion
  - OCIC Award: Jane Campion
- Belgian Syndicate of Cinema Critics (UCC) (1992):
  - Grand Prix
- Chicago Film Critics Association (CFCA) (1992):
  - CFCA Award: Best Foreign Language Film
- Independent Spirit Awards (1992)
  - Best Foreign Film: Jane Campion

== Impact and reception ==
"If Carson McCullers and David Lynch had run into Mary Cassatt somewhere in the green pastures of New Zealand, a film like An Angel at My Table might well have been the outcome."

— Mariam Niroumand, Cinéaste vol. 18, no. 4, 1991

An Angel at My Table was the first film from New Zealand to be screened at the Venice Film Festival, where it received multiple standing ovations and was awarded the Grand Special Jury Prize despite evoking yells of protest that it did not win The Golden Lion. In addition to virtually sweeping the local New Zealand film awards, it also took home the prize for best foreign film at the Independent Spirit Awards and the International Critics' Award at the Toronto International Film Festival. The film not only established Jane Campion as an emerging director and launched the career of Kerry Fox, but it also introduced a broader audience to Janet Frame's writing.

Roger Ebert gave the film 4 out of 4 stars, stating; "[The film] tells its story calmly and with great attention to human detail and, watching it, I found myself drawn in with a rare intensity". The film also received praise in The Guardian where film critic Derek Malcolm called it "one of the very best films of the year". The Sydney Morning Herald wrote, "Angel is a film where almost every image strikes the eye with the vividness of an inspired art composition: one where small incidents gain magical properties". Variety said the film is "potentially painful and harrowing...imbued with gentle humor and great compassion, which makes every character come vividly alive". In 2019, the BBC polled 368 film experts from 84 countries to name the 100 greatest films directed by women, with An Angel at My Table voted at No. 47.
