= Josef Ruzek =

Clinical psychologist

- Occupations: Psychologist, Educator

Academic background
- Education: SUNY Stony Brook

Academic work
- Discipline: Clinical Psychology
- Sub-discipline: Post-Traumatic Stress Disorder
- Institutions: Palo Alto University University of Colorado Stanford University

Josef I. Ruzek is a clinical psychologist specializing in post-traumatic stress disorder (PTSD) treatment, with a focus on early intervention, trauma prevention, and the application of technology to enhance treatment accessibility and effectiveness

== Education ==
Ruzek received his B.A. in Psychology from the University of California, Los Angeles in 1974. He went on to receive his Ph.D. in Clinical Psychology from the State University of New York at Stony Brook in 1989. His dissertation explored the concept of "articulated thoughts in imagined alcohol situations".

== Career ==
From 1981 to 1987, Ruzek served as the National Training Officer for the Addictions Community Centres for Education, Prevention, Treatment in London, England. Following this, he became Program Director of Adult Chemical Dependent Services at the Charter Hospital of Thousand Oaks, where he developed alcohol and drug treatment services. He later joined the National Center for PTSD, Veteran Affairs at the Palo Alto Health Care System , initially serving as Clinical Education Psychologist from 1992 to 1994, and as Associate Director for Education from 1994 to 2007. In May 2007, Ruzek was appointed Acting Director of the Dissemination and Training Division at the National Center for PTSD and became Director in 2008, a position he held for 10 years until retiring in April 2018. Throughout his tenure at the Center, he focused on implementing evidence-based treatments and integrating technology into PTSD care.

Ruzek was also actively involved in PTSD policy and treatment advancements, serving on the Veterans Affairs Undersecretary’s Special Committee on PTSD and the Board of Directors for the International Society for Traumatic Stress Studies. He contributed to the creation of the joint Veterans Affairs-Department of Defense Clinical Practice Guidelines. He serves as the co-founder and co-chair of the Early Intervention special interest group of the International Society for Traumatic Stress Studies. Ruzek played a key role in the nationwide implementation of Prolonged exposure therapy with the Veterans Health Administration. His recent work has centered on the use of technology interventions to prevent and treat PTSD.

As a consultant, Ruzek has worked with a variety of global organizations including the U.S. Air Force, Kobe Mental Health, Armenia Ministry of Defense, Institute of Psychology, Chinese Academy of Sciences, and Canada VA . He has co-developed internet and mobile phone interventions to assist in the treatment of PTSD such as My Disaster Recovery; PTSD Coach; PTSD Family Coach.

=== Academic affiliation ===
Ruzek is a Professor at the Department of Psychiatry and Behavioral Sciences at Stanford University. He has also held faculty positions at Palo Alto University and the University of Colorado. In addition, he serves as a Technology Innovation Expert Consultant at the Lyda Hill Institute for Human Resilience , University of Colorado Colorado Springs. Ruzek is a founding director of the Early Intervention Clinic at Palo Alto University and the Co-Director of the Center for m2 Health at Palo Alto University, California.

=== Early Intervention Clinic ===
The Early Intervention Clinic, co-founded by Josef Ruzek and Matthew Cordova in 2003, is a Palo Alto research clinic offering free, short-term counseling (up to 20 sessions) to individuals who have recently experienced a traumatic event (within two years). It is a research initiative that provides a tailored treatment to each person while evaluating outcomes in order to improve PTSD treatments. The goal of the Early Intervention Clinic is to help individuals regain pre-trauma functioning, and develop effective methods to promote recovery and improve quality of life for those impacted by trauma. Some of the research initiatives from the Early Intervention Clinic include a study examining how negative social responses can hinder recovery for individuals recently bereaved by suicide. The study focused on the types and extent of social constraints, such as stigma or well-meaning but awkward advice, that inhibit disclosure and support-seeking, ultimately serving as obstacles to recovery. Another study delves into the heightened risk of prolonged distress for those who have lost a loved one to suicide in comparison to other types of bereavement. It explores how the distress can be exacerbated by finding the body of the deceased and specifically examined the connections between discovering the body, anxiety sensitivity, and PTSD.

== Editorial work ==
Ruzek’s editorial work spans several psychological journals. He has served on the editorial board of the International Journal of Clinical and Health Psychology since 2017, and on mHealth (2019-2021). His editorial work includes longstanding roles on the boards of Behavior Research and Therapy (since 2011), TRAUMATOLOGYe (since 1996), Journal of Anxiety Disorders (since 2006), and Psychological Trauma (since 2008). Additionally, Ruzek served as an editorial board member for the Journal of Traumatic Stress from 2003 to 2008. He also served as a managing editor for the National Center for PTSD Clinical Quarterly (1994–2006) and an associate editor for Adult Interventions in the Encyclopedia of Psychological Trauma. Ruzek regularly reviews articles for journals like the American Journal of Public Health and Global Mental Health, Journal of Clinical Psychiatry, Harvard Review of Psychiatry, and the International Review of Psychiatry on an ad hoc basis.

== Research ==
Ruzek's research focuses on PTSD treatment and early interventions aimed at preventing the onset of PTSD. The paper, The Five Essential Elements of Immediate and Mid-Term Mass Trauma Intervention highlights five empirically supported principles for trauma intervention creating a framework to guide early and mid-term interventions after disasters. Additionally, he is involved in evaluating the United States Department of Veterans Affairs efforts to disseminate evidence-based therapies like Cognitive processing therapy (CPT) and Prolonged exposure therapy for veterans with PTSD, assessing the impact to ensure effective treatments He also explores cognitive-behavioral approaches to treating PTSD across various trauma experiences, offering practical strategies for clinicians. Alongside Schnurr, Vasterling, and Friedman, Ruzzek explores psychological trauma and PTSD among military veterans and civilians from Operation Enduring Freedom in Afghanistan and Operation Iraqi Freedom in the book, Caring for Veterans with Deployment-related Stress Disorders. The book provides a framework for understanding and addressing psychological trauma and PTSD among military veterans and civilians worldwide and aims to support clinical practice with evidence-based information for clinicians. Ruzek's work takes on a comprehensive approach, not only focusing on the treatment of PTSD but also on preventing it.

A significant aspect of his work involves developing technology-based solutions to for the effective treatment of PTSD. Examples of are afterdeployment.org, a website designed for returning veterans and their families, and the PTSD Coach, a smartphone app created to help individuals with PTSD manage acute distress. Ruzek has received several grants ranging from $39, 070 to $10,000,000 from organizations such as the Congressionally Directed Medical Research Programs, VA-DoD Joint Incentive Fund, Office of Mental Health Services, and the National Institute of Mental Health.

== Community outreach ==
Ruzek serves on the Board of Directors for the Center for Deployment Psychology at the Department of Defense. He was a member of the Planning Committee and Participant, Consensus Workshop on Mental Health and Mass Violence: EvidenceBased Early Psychological Intervention for Victims/Survivors of Mass Violence, 2001, and a member of the CDC Expert Panel on Behavioral Health Aspects of Pandemic Influenza, 2004, amongst others. Additionally, he holds positions on the Advisory Board of the Veterans Healthcare Policy Institute as well as the Healthcare Provider Advisory Committee, of PsychArmor Institute.

== Publications ==
Books

Follette, V. M., Ruzek, J. I., & Abueg, F. R. (eds.). (1998). Cognitive-behavioral therapies for trauma. The Guilford Press.

Online/Cellphone Clinical/Preventive Interventions

Ruzek has worked on online/cellphone interventions for the prevention and treatment of PTSD. He contributed to afterdeployment.org, an initiative within the Defense Centers of Excellence for Psychological Health and Traumatic Brain Injury. This platform offers self-care solutions designed to address post-traumatic stress, depression, and other behavioral health issues that commonly arise after deployment. It also conducts research to identify best practices for delivering online mental health resources to service members, their families, and veterans. Some of the preventive interventions Ruzek worked on with afterdeployment.org are afterdeployment.org Improving Relationships afterdeployment.org Work Success,afterdeployment.org Alcohol and Drug Problems.

Ruzek also published preventive interventions on MyHealtheVet, a resource designed for veterans, service members, their dependents, and caregivers. It offers various tools and tips to facilitate collaboration with healthcare teams, enabling users to manage their health more effectively. Some of the preventive interventions he worked on are MyHealtheVet Stress Management and MyHealtheVet Managing Triggers and Reminders.

Treatment Manuals

Ruzek has contributed to the development of treatment manuals, such as the Psychological First Aid Field Operations Manual. Psychological First Aid serves as a comprehensive guide for mental health and disaster response workers. It offers an evidence-informed approach aimed at assisting children, adolescents, adults, and families in the immediate aftermath of disasters and terrorism. The manual focuses on reducing initial distress from traumatic events while promoting both short- and long-term adaptive functioning and coping strategies. This structured framework enables responders to provide effective early intervention support to those affected by trauma.

Ruzek alongside Cordova, Benoit, and Brunet authored the Promotion of Emotional Disclosure Following Illness and Injury: A brief intervention for Medical Patients and Their Families. This manual examines the psychosocial effects of illness and injury and the significance of cognitive-emotional processing and social contexts in recovery. It details interventions aimed at promoting cognitive-emotional processing among medical patients and their families and offers practical suggestions for effective implementation.

Some other treatment manuals Ruzek has written are Work Success for Veterans with PTSD: Group and Individual Counseling Manual and Skills for Psychological Recovery. He has also worked on online/cellphone practitioner training materials such as PTSD 101: Cognitive-behavioral Interventions for PTSD, PTSD 101: VA-DoD Clinical Practice Guideline for Management of Traumatic Stress, Veterans Health Initiative: Weapons of Mass Destruction.
