= Frank Sargeson House =

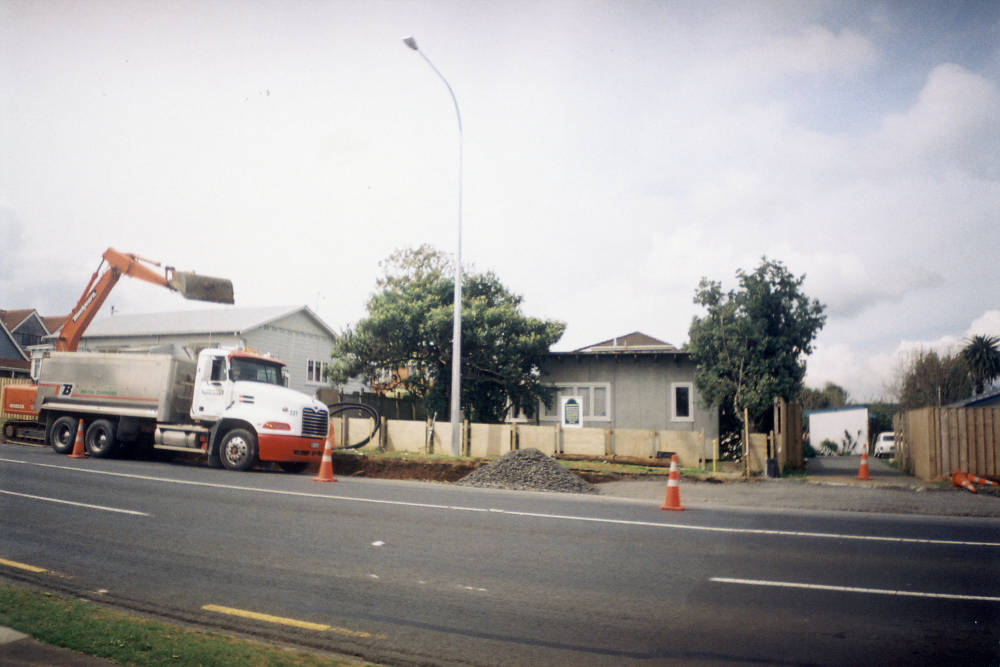
- Frank Sargeson House in 2006
- Interactive map of the Frank Sargeson House area

General information
- Type: House
- Location: Takapuna, Auckland, New Zealand, 14A Esmonde Road, Takapuna, Auckland
- Coordinates: 36.7944°S 174.7739°E
- Completed: 1948
- Owner: Frank Sargeson Trust

Heritage New Zealand – Category 1
- Designated: 6 June 2004
- Reference no.: 7540

The Frank Sargeson House is a 20th century cottage located in Takapuna, Auckland. It was the home of New Zealand writer Frank Sargeson. It is now a museum, and is owned by the Frank Sargeson Trust.

== Description ==
The Frank Sargeson House is timber-framed and clad in fibrolite. It has a mono-pitch roof made from corrugated iron. The house originally consisted of three rooms: a bedroom, a living room and kitchen, and a bathroom; as well as a small front porch. It is believed to have been inspired by Vernon Brown's designs.

The flooring of the house is rimu timber, and the living room contains an open fireplace. A range of furniture was made for the house, including a tabletop and bookshelves.

An additional bedroom was added to the house in 1967.

== History ==
In 1924, Frank Sargeson's family acquired the block of land at 14 Esmonde Road, Takapuna. At the time, the property contained a small single-room bach. Sargeson moved to the property permanently in 1931 at the age of 28, and eventually acquired full ownership in 1946. The bach was demolished and replaced with the current Frank Sargeson House itself in 1948. The house was designed by Sargeson's friend George Haydn and constructed by Haydn's building firm; Haydn & Rollett. In 1967, an additional room was constructed and was inhabited by Sargeson's friend and likely partner, Harry Doyle.

Sargeson lived in the house until his death in 1982 and wrote many of his works there. He is said to have enjoyed writing, gardening and entertaining guests at the house, especially fellow writers. Many New Zealand authors would visit and write at the house with Sargeson, to the point where C.K. Stead described the property as "the still point around which the literary consciousness of New Zealand seemed to revolve". Janet Frame lived at the property between 1955-1956 while she wrote her first novel, Owls Do Cry.

After Frank Sargeson's death in 1982, his ashes were scattered under a loquat tree in the house garden. The ashes of Chris Cathcart, who founded the New Independent Theatre alongside Sargeson, are also believed to be scattered on the property grounds. The property was given to Christine Cole Catley, who established the Frank Sargeson Trust.

In 2004, the Frank Sargeson House was designated as a Category 1 Historic Place. It is one of three literary houses that are open to the public in New Zealand.

== Present day ==
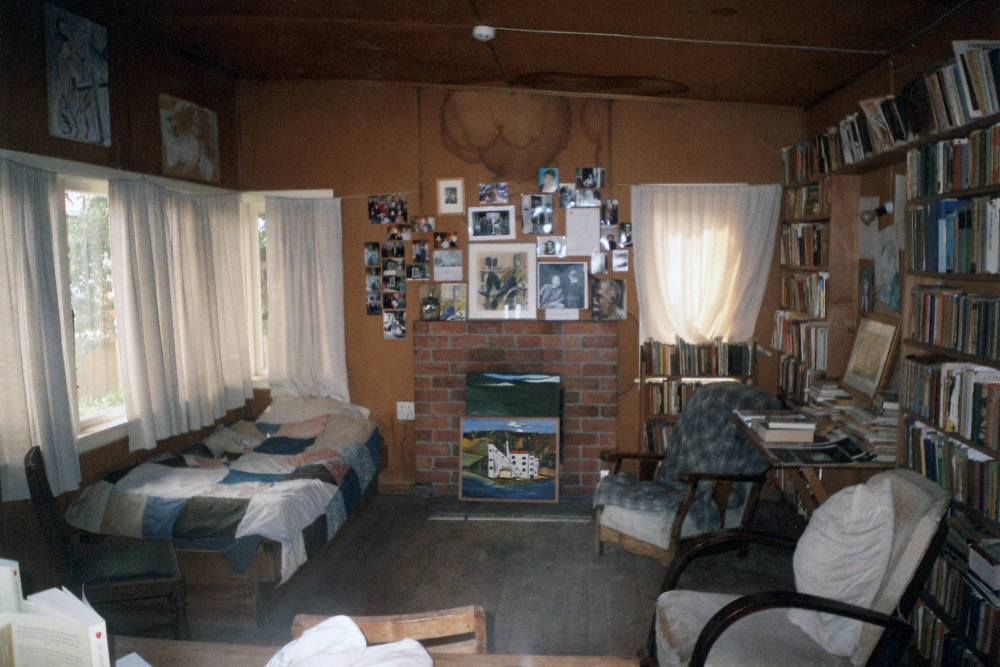
The Frank Sargeson House living space.

The Frank Sargeson Trust now owns the property and is responsible for its management. The house has been maintained in the state it was in during Sargeson's lifetime. Many historic items are still within the house, such as Sargeson's typewriter. The property has been subdivided in the years since Sargeson's death with the proceeds going towards a writer's fellowship.

The Frank Sargeson House is open to the public, however, visitors must be accompanied by a librarian due to concerns of theft.

== Gallery ==
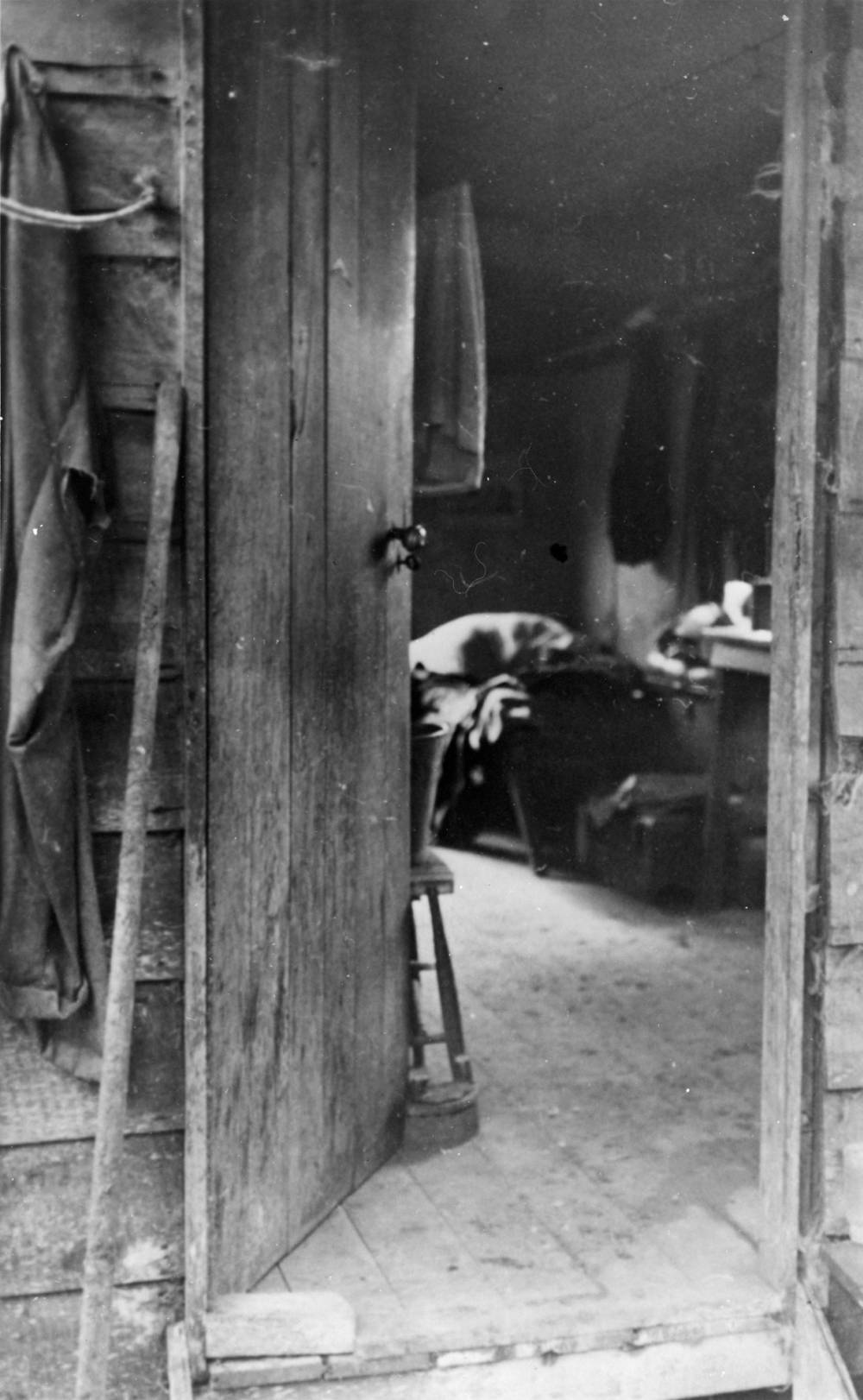
Frank Sargeson House from the door looking into the bedroom.

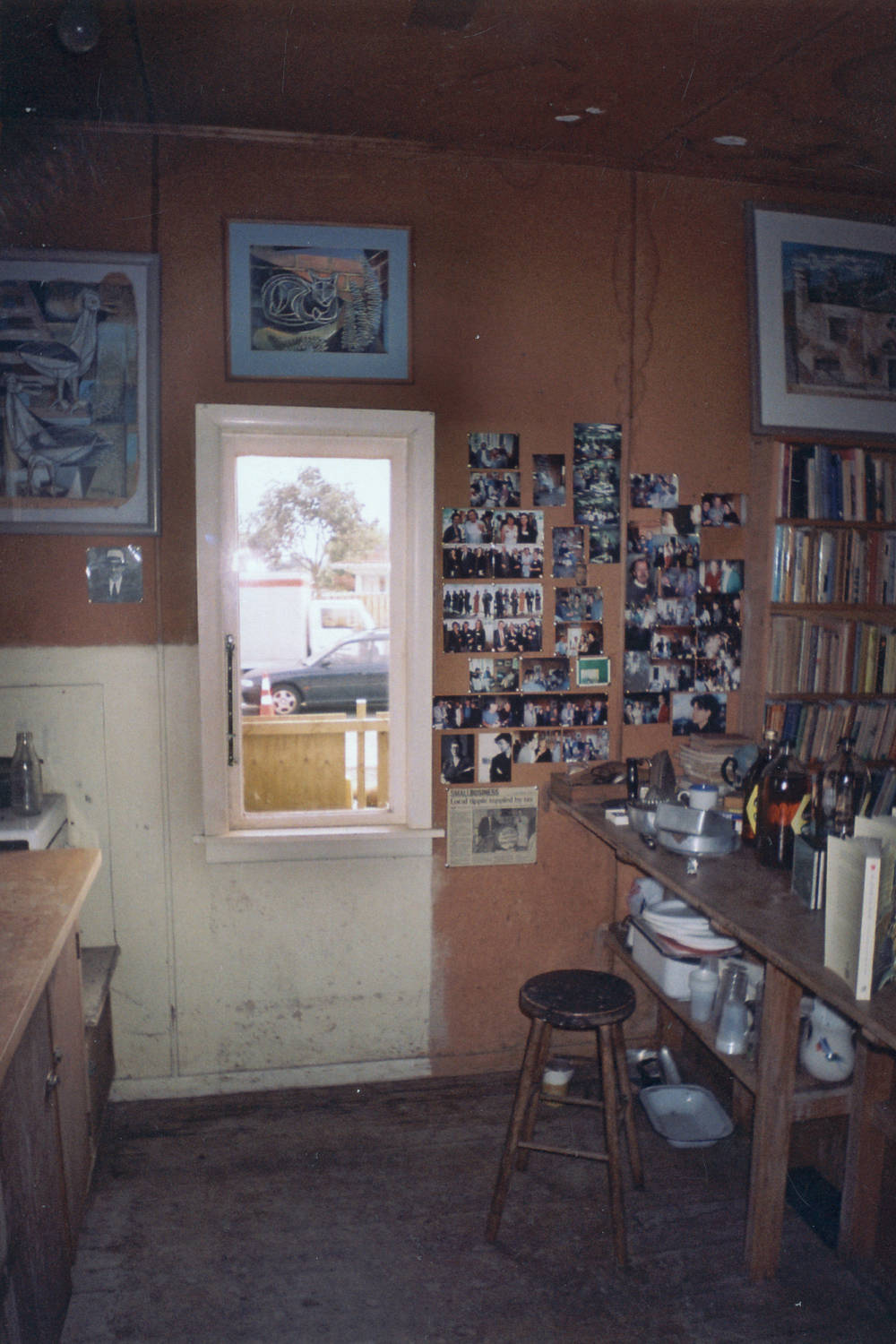
Kitchen area of the main room, facing Edmonde Road.

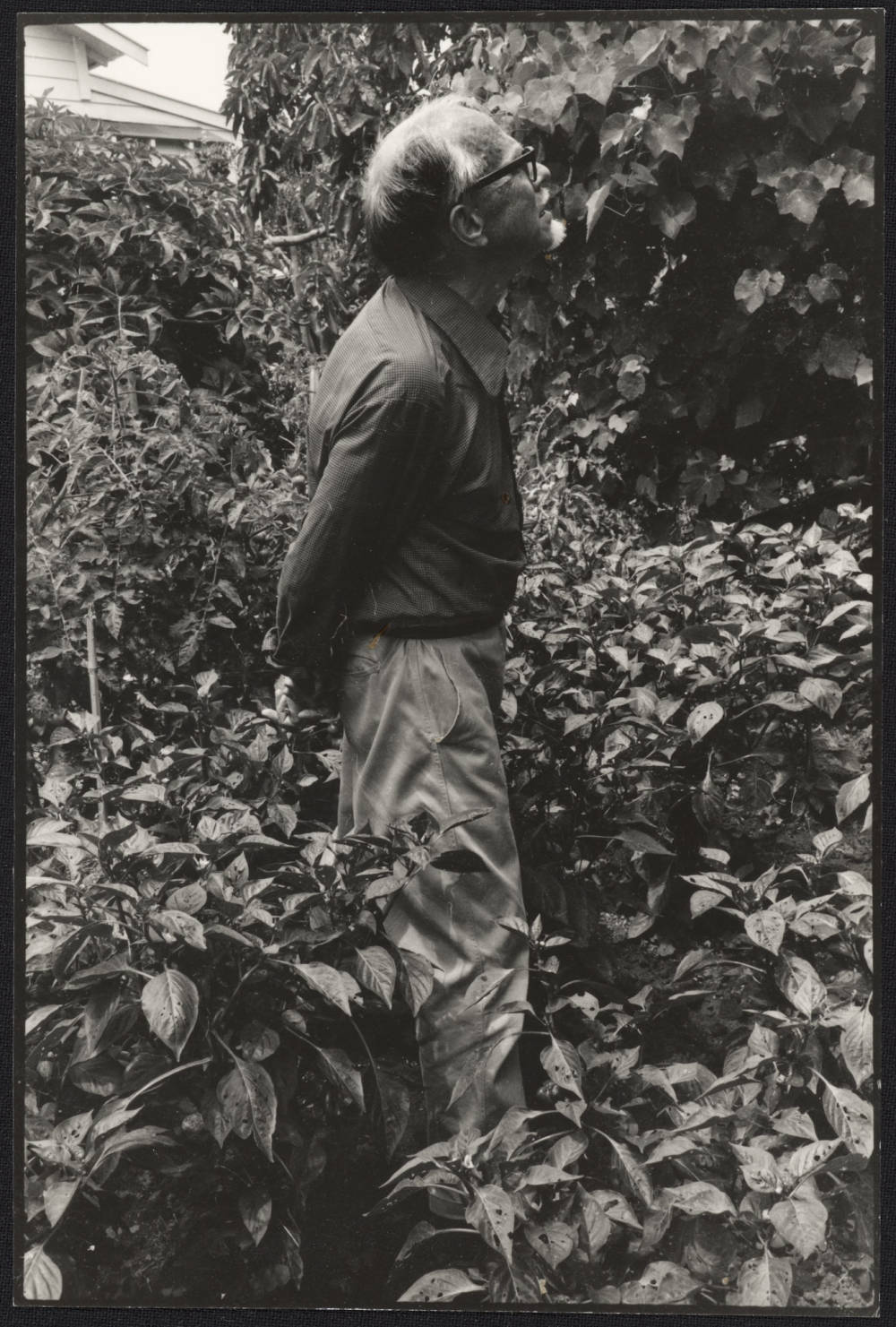
Sargeson in the gardens outside the house.
