= Sargeson Prize =

New Zealand short story prize

- Awarded for: Short stories of no more than 5000 words
- Sponsored by: The University of Waikato
- Location: New Zealand
- Eligibility: New Zealand citizens and permanent residents aged 16 and over
- First award: 2019
- Final award: ongoing

The Sargeson Prize is New Zealand's highest-endowed short-story prize. It is awarded for unpublished stories of 5000 words or less submitted by New Zealand citizens and permanent residents.

The prize honours the legacy of Frank Sargeson, one of New Zealand's most prolific and notable short-story writers. Along with publishing over forty short stories, plays and novels, Sargeson is noted for his support of emerging New Zealand authors. The prize continues to aid writers by offering its winner prize money and publication. The value of the first prize has gradually increased from $5,000 in its first year to $15,000 in the 2025 competition. The first prize for the secondary schools division includes a week-long writing residency at the University of Waikato. From 2026, outstanding entrants in the secondary schools division may also be nominated for a Vice-Chancellor’s Scholarship worth up to $15,000 to study at the University of Waikato.

There are two divisions to the prize. The open division is for New Zealand citizens and permanent residents over the age of 16. The secondary schools division is specifically open to New Zealand secondary school students between 16 and 18 years of age.

== Founding and sponsorship ==
Catherine Chidgey, author and associate professor in writing studies at the University of Waikato, founded the Sargeson Prize in 2019 in recognition of Frank Sargeson's influence on New Zealand literature.

Sargeson took up a role as mentor to many authors who later became leading figures in New Zealand's literary scene, including the likes of Janet Frame, Maurice Duggan and John Reece Cole. Within his own stories, Sargeson was celebrated for capturing a constrained, working-class voice of New Zealand culture that had not been heard in short fiction up to that point.

The University of Waikato sponsors the Sargeson Prize, offering first, second and third prizes in open and secondary schools divisions, along with highly commended stories.

=== Open division ===
The open division takes submissions from New Zealand citizens (including those who may be based abroad) and permanent residents aged 16 and over. Entries must be single, unpublished short stories written in English. Stories should be no more than 5000 words. All three winning stories are now published in Newsroom's literary section, ReadingRoom.

=== Secondary schools division ===
The secondary schools division is open to students who are enrolled at a secondary school or homeschooling in New Zealand. They must be aged between 16 and 18 years old on the date that competition entries close. Entries must be single, unpublished stories of no more than 3000 words.

The winning story is published by Newsroom in its ReadingRoom section. The winner also receives a one-week writing residency at the University of Waikato. This opportunity secures mentoring in the School of Arts, with meals and accommodation in the halls of residence. Recipients under 18 years of age require parental approval to attend.

== Winners and judges ==
Year	Prize	Author	Title	Judge	Prize
2019	First prize, open division	Sam Keenan	"Better Graces"	Catherine Chidgey	$5000 Published in Landfall and Mayhem
2019	Second prize, open division	Elizabeth Morton	"Elephant"	Catherine Chidgey	$1000 Published in Mayhem
2019	Third prize, open division	Hamish Ansley	"Vicious Traditions"	Catherine Chidgey	$500 Published in Mayhem
2019	First equal prize, secondary schools division	Elijah Neilson-Edwards Xiaole Zhan	"Stray Dog" "Woman, sitting in a garden"	Catherine Chidgey	$500 Published in Mayhem
2019	Second prize, secondary schools division	Ariana Happy	"Through Glass Eels"	Catherine Chidgey	$200
2019	Third prize, secondary schools division	Amberlea Gordon	"The White Dress"	Catherine Chidgey	$100
2020	First Prize, Open Division	Angela Pope	"Lies"	Owen Marshall	$5000 Published in Landfall and Mayhem
2020	Second prize, open division	Sally Franicevich	"The Consolidation Phase"	Owen Marshall	$1000 Published in Mayhem
2020	Third prize, open division	David Coventry	"Apologies, Please"	Owen Marshall	$500 Published in Mayhem
2020	First prize, secondary schools division	Amelia Isac	"Nic"	Owen Marshall	$500 Published in Mayhem
2020	Second prize, secondary schools division	Kezia Rogers	"Twelve for a Wicked Curse"	Owen Marshall	$200
2020	Third prize, secondary schools division	Darcy Monteath	"3 levels of mandatory obedience & sapien rebellion"	Owen Marshall	$100
2021	First prize, open division	Lara Markstein	"Good Men"	Patricia Grace	$6000 Published by Newsroom in ReadingRoom
2021	Second prize, open division	Mikee Sto Domingo	"The Duwende"	Patricia Grace	$1000 Published by Newsroom in ReadingRoom
2021	Third prize, open division	Jordan Hamel	"Unexpected item in the bagging area"	Patricia Grace	$500 Published by Newsroom in ReadingRoom
2021	First prize, secondary schools division	Shima Jack	"Muscle Memory"	Patricia Grace	$500 Published by Newsroom in ReadingRoom
2021	Second prize, secondary schools division	Jade Wilson	"What Makes a Forest"	Patricia Grace	$200
2021	Third prize, secondary schools division	Stella Weston	"Ghosts"	Patricia Grace	$100
2022	First prize, open division	Leeanne O'Brien	"Crawl Space"	Fiona Kidman	$10000 Published by Newsroom in ReadingRoom
2022	Second prize, open division	Emily Perkins	"The Warning"	Fiona Kidman	$1000 Published by Newsroom in ReadingRoom
2022	Third prize, open division	Stephen Coates	"Brendon Varney Opens the Door"	Fiona Kidman	$500 Published by Newsroom in ReadingRoom
2022	First prize, secondary schools division	Shima Jack	"Fourth Wall"	Fiona Kidman	$500 Published by Newsroom in ReadingRoom
2022	Second prize, secondary schools division	Maggie Yang	"Breaking Up, Breaking Down"	Fiona Kidman	$200
2022	Third prize, secondary schools division	Reema Arsilan	"A Half-Truth is a Lie"	Fiona Kidman	$100
2023	First prize, open division	Anna Woods	"Pig Hunting"	Vincent O'Sullivan	$10000 Published by Newsroom in ReadingRoom
2023	Second prize, open division	Jake Arthur	"On Beauty"	Vincent O'Sullivan	$1000 Published by Newsroom in ReadingRoom
2023	Third prize, open division	Claire Gray	"Apple Wine"	Vincent O'Sullivan	$500 Published by Newsroom in ReadingRoom
2023	First prize, secondary schools division	Tunmise Adebowale	"The Catastrophe of Swimming"	Vincent O'Sullivan	$2000 Published by Newsroom in ReadingRoom
2023	Second prize, secondary schools division	Leo Reid	"triptych"	Vincent O'Sullivan	$200
2023	Third prize, secondary schools division	Jade Wilson	"Archeological"	Vincent O'Sullivan	$100
2024	First prize, open division	Ben Jeffries	"Greywacke"	Harriet Allan	$10,000 Published by Newsroom in ReadingRoom
2024	Second prize, open division	Craig Cliff	"Robinson in the Roof Space"	Harriet Allan	$1000 Published by Newsroom in ReadingRoom
2024	Third prize, open division	Cello Forrester	"Michael"	Harriet Allan	$500 Published by Newsroom in ReadingRoom
2024	First prize, secondary schools division	Reshma Tala	"Burgundy Bindi"	Harriet Allan	$2000 Published by Newsroom in ReadingRoom
2024	Second prize, secondary schools division	Tessa Marshall	"The contributor"	Harriet Allan	$200
2024	Third prize, secondary schools division	Juliet Blythe	"Saturn's Orbit"	Harriet Allan	$100
2025	First prize, open division	Becky Manawatu	"The Vase"	Elizabeth Knox	$15,000 Published by Newsroom in ReadingRoom
2025	Second prize, open division	Maria Wickens	"My Pal Mal"	Elizabeth Knox	$1000 Published by Newsroom in ReadingRoom
2025	Third prize, open division	Kate Duignan	"Orange Warning"	Elizabeth Knox	$500 Published by Newsroom in ReadingRoom
2025	First prize, secondary schools division	Brooke Smith	"Piece of the Furniture"	Elizabeth Knox	$2000 Published by Newsroom in ReadingRoom
2025	Second prize, secondary schools division	Haelyn King	"Double Solitaire"	Elizabeth Knox	$1000
2025	Third prize, secondary schools division	Thomas Beaglehole-Smith	"Glory Keeps Fucking with My Throat"	Elizabeth Knox	$500
2026	First prize, open division	Mikee Donato	"Wilding Pines"	Becky Manawatu	$15,000 To be published by Newsroom in ReadingRoom
2026	Second prize, open division	Cait Kneller	"Teal"	Becky Manawatu	$1000 To be published by Newsroom in ReadingRoom
2026	Third prize, open division	Lorraine Carmody	"Alone"	Becky Manawatu	$500 To be published by Newsroom in ReadingRoom
2026	First prize, secondary schools division	Haelyn King	"When the Pōhutukawa Blooms"	Becky Manawatu	$2000 To be published by Newsroom in ReadingRoom
2026	Second prize, secondary schools division	Nadia Tan	"In Our/My Bedroom"	Becky Manawatu	$1000
2026	Third prize, secondary schools division	Felix King-Borrero	"Something Original"	Becky Manawatu	$500

== The Frank Sargeson Memorial Lecture ==
Winners of the Sargeson Prize are announced annually at the Frank Sargeson Memorial Lecture, organised by Dr Sarah Shieff and hosted jointly by the University of Waikato and the Friends of Hamilton Public Library. Prominent New Zealand authors deliver the lecture, and winners of the competition are announced at the end of the proceedings. During the coronavirus lockdown restrictions of 2020 and 2021, the announcements were held online.

== See also ==
- Grimshaw-Sargeson Fellowship
