= New Zealand Association of Psychotherapists =

New Zealand professional body for psychotherapists

- Formation: 1947
- Type: Professional association
- Region served: New Zealand
- Field: Psychotherapy
- President: Seán Manning
- Website: www.nzap.org.nz

The New Zealand Association of Psychotherapists Te Rōpū Whakaora Hinengaro (NZAP) is a professional associations for psychotherapists in New Zealand.

== History ==
The college was established in 1947 at a meeting in Christchurch by Maurice Bevan-Brown, as a way to promote psychoanalysis as a way to address New Zealand's high rate of admissions to mental hospitals.

In the following year, the association helped establish the first university course in psychological medicine and psychotherapy in New Zealand, held at Canterbury University College.

== See also ==
- Therapeutic assessment
- Institutional psychotherapy
- Center for Deployment Psychology
