= Parents Centres New Zealand =

Parents Centre Aotearoa
- Founder: Helen Brew
- Type: Educational Charity
- Region served: New Zealand
- Services: Education and Support for Parents
- Key people: Helen Brew, Christine Cole Catley

Parents Centres Aotearoa, formerly Parents Centres New Zealand, is a registered charity in New Zealand, offering childbirth education, parent education and support services. It was established in 1952. In mid November 2024, the charity announced that it would shut down by 31 December 2024 due to financial difficulties.

== History ==
Helen Brew, one of the founders of Parents Centre, had wanted a natural birth for her second child. Following her birth experience Helen Brew, together with Christine Cole Catley, went on to found the very first Parents Centre in Wellington in 1952.

The original name for Parents Centre was the Natural Child Birth Association, as an early focus was to empower women and men to understand more about the birthing process and how relaxation and exercise could contribute to a positive birthing experience.

The organisation was renamed ‘Parents Centre’.

One of Parents Centres' early achievements was successfully advocating for the father to be able to be present at the birth. Husbands had not been allowed to attend the birth, or often to even support their wives through the labour. Doctors Jim and Jane Ritchie, both key figures in developmental psychology in New Zealand, as well as active members of Wellington Parents Centre, were key advocates in this long struggle.

The article prompted a flood of supportive letters to the newspaper and Parents Centre sponsored a meeting which drew 150 people. A protest was arranged, but it was another eight years of advocacy before Wellington hospitals allowed men to be present at births.

Over the years which have followed there have been many achievements by Parents Centre; baby's ‘rooming in’ with mothers after birth; sick children in hospital having their parents stay with them; the removal of salt and sugar from baby food; the establishment of childbirth education classes and the rights of women to form their own birth plans.

Today, Parents Centres New Zealand operates through over 50 Centres nationwide. The organisation continues to work for parents and children of New Zealand, including most recently tackling issues around the repeal of Section 59 of the Crimes Act, spearheading the Flexible Working Conditions bill and Corrections breastfeeding of babies in prison bill, tackling the sensitive issues around child poverty and poor health and running parenting programmes in 19 of the country's prisons.

Parents Centres continue run a wide range of parenting programmes, from childbirth education through to conscious parenting programmes for children up to the age of 6, and publish New Zealand's longest running parenting magazine (established in 1954), Kiwiparent.

On 22 November 2024, the Parents Centre announced that it would close by the end of the year, citing financial difficulties and rising operating costs. Nelson Parents Centre antenatal tutor Amelia Crundwell expressed concern that the closure of the Parents Centre would make it harder for new parents to access quality maternity care and that an unregulated maternity centre would allow unqualified players to emerge.
