= The Wish Child =

2016 novel by Catherine Chidgey

- Cover of 1st edition (Victoria University Press)
- Author: Catherine Chidgey
- Language: English
- Set in: Nazi Germany
- Publisher: Victoria University Press
- Publication date: 2016
- Publication place: New Zealand
- Pages: 384 (1st edition)
- ISBN: 9781776560622 (1st edition)

The Wish Child is a novel by Catherine Chidgey published in New Zealand in 2016. Based on the lives of two families in Nazi Germany, and drawing on Chidgey's own experiences of living in Berlin, the novel was praised by reviewers for its original treatment of a historically fraught subject. It won the 2017 Acorn Foundation Fiction Prize at the Ockham New Zealand Book Awards, New Zealand's top award for fiction, and was published in the UK and US in 2017 and 2018.

== Background and publication history ==
The Wish Child is Chidgey's fourth novel, and was published thirteen years after her third. Chidgey has said the gap was partly due to infertility struggles leading her to abandon the novel for some time; her daughter was born in 2015. While the novel is not about infertility, it was influenced by her feelings about families and the relationships between parents and children.

The novel was informed by three years Chidgey spent living in Berlin in the 1990s, and the title was inspired by the German expression "wish child" meaning a much-wanted child. It is about two families living in Nazi Germany: a rural bee-keeping family and a middle-class family in Berlin. Told by an all-knowing narrator (whose identity is secret until the last part of the novel), the story focuses on the children of each family, Erich and Sieglinde.

After its 2016 New Zealand publication by Victoria University Press, the novel was published in the UK in July 2017 by Chatto & Windus, and in the US in October 2018 by Counterpoint.

== Reception ==
The novel won New Zealand's top fiction award, the 2017 Acorn Foundation Fiction Prize at the Ockham New Zealand Book Awards, which includes prize money of NZ$50,000. Peter Wells, one of the judges, has noted the choice required some discussion and that it featured an unusual setting for a New Zealand novel. It was also nominated for the 2018 Dublin Literary Award by the Christchurch City Libraries.

The novel received critical acclaim in New Zealand. Radio New Zealand called it "a brilliant, brilliant novel ... a masterpiece". The New Zealand Herald found it "meticulously crafted and superbly written ... provocative, haunting, intelligent and lyrical ... breath-taking" and said it "will stay with you long after you finish the final page". Paula Green in Sunday Star-Times praised Chidgey's writing as "musical, clear, lovingly tended" and said she loved "this book with its subterranean mysteries and spiky issues" as well as the way the book reminds the reader "with grace and understated wisdom of a need to strive for universal good".

Stephanie Johnson in the Aotearoa New Zealand Review of Books said the novel's long gestation period "results in sentences polished till they sing, in rich, unhurried storytelling and intimate understanding of period and characters". Johnson suggested that a reader unfamiliar with Chidgey would expect her to be a wartime German writer given her understanding of the period, and concluded that the work is "vivid, informed and profound".

International reviews also praised the novel. The Times called it "a remarkable book with a stunningly original twist". The novel received a starred review from Kirkus Reviews, which praised the way the revelation of the narrator's identity "gradually illuminates the true horrors endured by the rest of the characters in this devastating work". The Los Angeles Review of Books noted that despite the enormity of the subject, the novel is "quiet, subtle, almost uncanny"; "Telling a story of Nazi families in Hitler's Germany without romanticizing atrocity, reenacting monstrosity, or sentimentalizing barbarity is a high-wire act, and Chidgey more than keeps her balance." Publishers Weekly recommended "Chidgey's delicate and elegant novel" to fans of The Book Thief.
