= Renate Prince =

German born New Zealand architect and librarian

- Born: Renate Prinz; 1929 (age 96–97); Germany
- Occupation: Architect
- Notable work: The Taylor House (Devonport, Auckland), The Bryant House (Milford, Auckland)

Renate Prince (born 1929) born Renate Prinz, is a German-born, New Zealand-trained architect who worked in Auckland in the early 1950s as part of the architecture and development group Structural Developments and then as a partner in Hobin Prince Architects. She is known for jointly designing, along with Dick Hobin, two experimental and modernist houses, the Taylor House at 16A Mays Road, Devonport, and the Bryant House at 81 Forrest Hill Road, Milford. As at 2023 both these houses can still be seen in Auckland. She subsequently moved to London in the 1950s and continued to work there as an architect and architectural engineer for over 40 years.

== Early life ==
Prince was born to Lina Prinz in 1929 in Germany. In 1940 Prince emigrated to New Zealand with her mother and brother because of the Nazi regime and the resulting dangers to the family. Upon arrival in New Zealand the family used the name Prince and established themselves in Christchurch. Prince attended Canterbury University College from 1946 but in 1948 she was studying architecture at the University of Auckland.

While at the University of Auckland Prince met her professional and personal partner Dick Hobin as he was also studying architecture. During this time Prince also met Frank Sargeson and in 1951 began boarding at the army hut on his property. In doing so she joined an important hub of writers, architects and other cultural influencers.

== Professional life ==
It was during this time that Prince was employed by the architectural firm Structural Developments helping to design two experimental and modernist houses – the Taylor House at 16A Mays Road, Devonport, and the Bryant House at 81 Forrest Hill Road, Milford.

In July 1952 Prince left New Zealand for the United Kingdom, working as an architect in London again in partnership with Hobin. In the mid-1950s Prince enrolled at Ulm School of Design and subsequently graduated from that institution with a Diplom-Ingenieur. After graduating she continued to work in London undertaking engineering and architectural commissions and also taught at the Architectural Association.

In 1968 Prince took part in protests against the Vietnam War. During this time she designed kits and pontoons to be used for bridge building in Northern Vietnam. She also campaigned for British architects to boycott products produced by Dow Chemicals as a result of that company manufacturing the napalm used in the war.

== Personal life ==
Prince lived in London and for over 40 years shared her life with Martin Birnstingl until his death in 2011.
