= The Carpathians =

1988 novel by Janet Frame

- First edition (NZ)
- Author: Janet Frame
- Publisher: Century Hutchinson
- Publication date: 1988
- Publication place: New Zealand
- ISBN: 0-8076-1205-7

The Carpathians is the last novel that was published in her lifetime by New Zealand writer Janet Frame. It was published in 1988 and awarded that year's Commonwealth Writers' Prize. Frame also won the New Zealand Book Award for Fiction for the novel in 1989.

== Plot ==
The Carpathians combines elements of Magical Realism, postmodernism and metafiction.

The protagonist, Mattina Brecon, is a wealthy New Yorker whose husband, Jake, is a novelist struggling to follow up the success of his smash-hit debut. Mattina, upon hearing the legend of the Memory Flower, decides to fly to New Zealand to visit a rural town, Puamahara, where the magical flower, said to release the memories of the land, linking them with the future, is rumoured to grow. Once there, Mattina rents a house on Kowhai Street, where, posing as a novelist, she sets out to record the lives of her new antipodean neighbours. As she discovers, however, the locals are also ‘impostors’, brought into existence by the memory of another time and place. Eventually, the town slowly begins to resemble a cemetery, silent and dead still. As Mattina begins to unravel the secrets of Kowhai Street she discovers, in her own bedroom a mysterious presence. The novel is hijacked by one of Mattina's new neighbours who describes herself as an imposter novelist, as Mattina gradually loses her grip on time and place.
