= Catherine Chidgey =

New Zealand writer

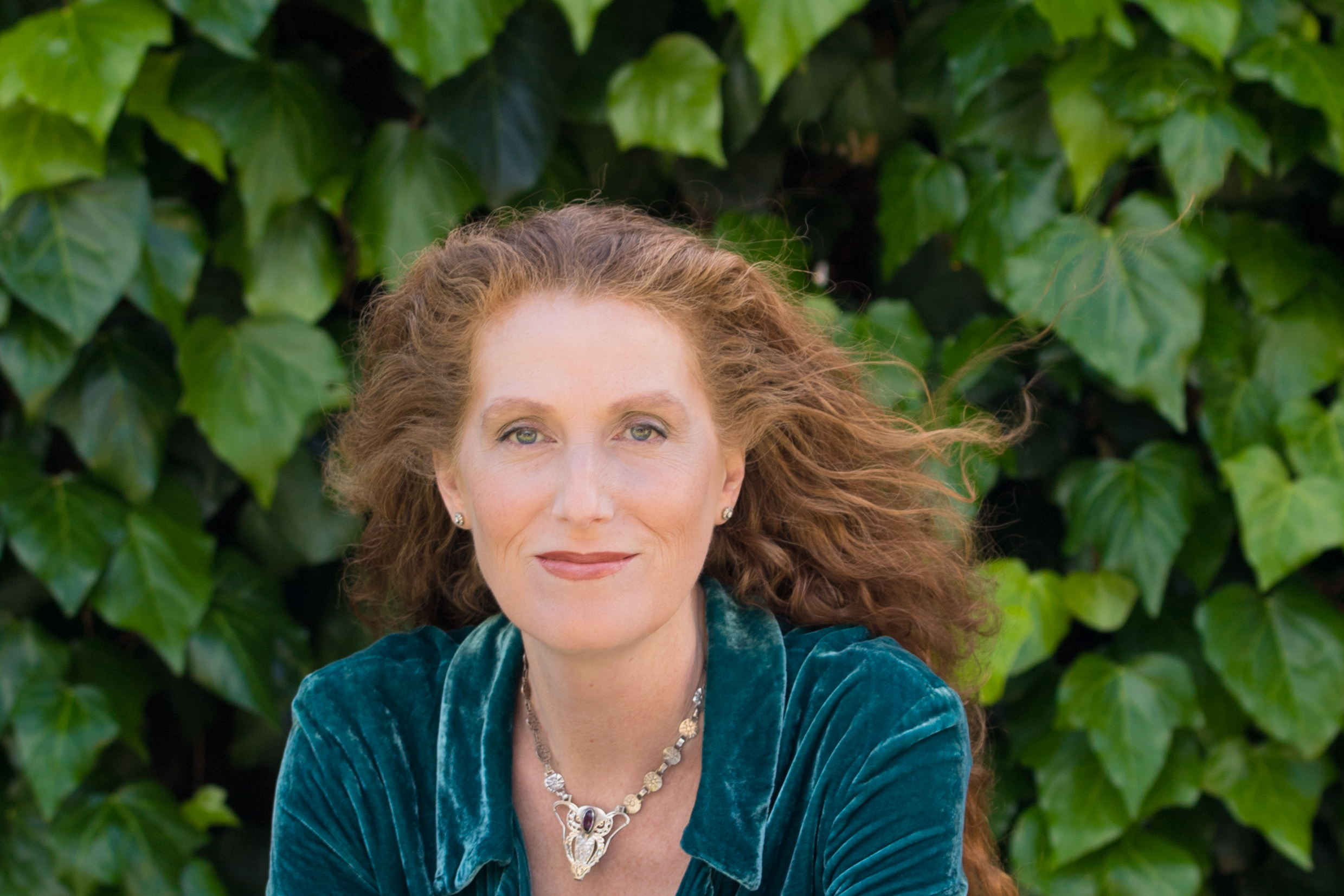
- Chidgey in November 2019
- Born: 8 April 1970 (age 56); Auckland, New Zealand
- Education: Victoria University of Wellington
- Occupations: Novelist; university lecturer
- Spouse: Alan Bekhuis
- Children: 1
- Writing career
- Genre: Fiction
- Notable work: The Wish Child
- Notable awards: New Zealand Book Awards, Katherine Mansfield Fellowship

Catherine Chidgey (born 8 April 1970) is a New Zealand novelist, short-story writer and university lecturer. She has published nine novels, including The Wish Child. Her honours include the inaugural Prize in Modern Letters; the Katherine Mansfield Fellowship to Menton, France; Best First Book at both the New Zealand Book Awards and the Commonwealth Writers' Prize (South East Asia and Pacific Region); the top prize for Fiction at the New Zealand Book Awards on two occasions; and the Janet Frame Fiction Prize.

== Early life and family ==
Chidgey was born in Auckland and grew up in the Hutt Valley. At Victoria University of Wellington she completed a BSc in Psychology, and a BA in German Language and Literature. In 1993 she was awarded a German Academic Exchange Service scholarship to study at the Freie Universität Berlin. She returned to Victoria University in 1997 to complete an MA in Creative Writing under Bill Manhire.

As of 2021 she lives in Hamilton with her husband and daughter. Chidgey has explained that the 13-year gap between her third and fourth novels was due to infertility issues keeping her from writing; she and her husband finally had their daughter in 2015.

== Career ==
=== Early novels ===
Her debut novel, In a Fishbone Church, was published in 1998 and was widely praised in New Zealand and overseas, winning the Hubert Church Award for Best First Book of Fiction at the New Zealand Book Awards in 1998. The writer Nick Hornby said "Catherine Chidgey is a wonderful new talent, and In a Fishbone Church marks the beginning of what promises to be a glorious literary career". Louis de Bernières called the novel "warm, subtle and evocative. You will be thinking about it long after you have finished reading". In 1999 In a Fishbone Church won Best First Book at the Commonwealth Writers' Prize (South East Asia and Pacific Region). It also won a Betty Trask Award for a first book (UK), and was longlisted for the Orange Prize for Fiction (UK).

Her second novel, Golden Deeds, was published in 2000, and was runner-up for the Deutz Medal for Fiction at the 2000 New Zealand Book Awards. It was published by Picador in the UK and by Henry Holt in the US (under the title The Strength of the Sun), where it was a 2002 Notable Book of the Year in The New York Times Book Review, and a 2002 Best Book in the LA Times Book Review. The Times Literary Supplement called it "magnanimous and merciless, a work reminiscent at times of darkest Atwood ... A witty and melancholy alchemy of heat and chill, a work of craft and fluency, which revitalizes the book in all its guises ... for those who love books, Catherine Chidgey is a find". The Sunday Express called it "a wonderful, gripping read. Human relations and needs are explored in all their complexity. Chidgey proves herself to be among that elite group of authors who possess a true grasp of the patterns of life". The Independent on Sunday said the novel "ensnares you, creeps up and snaffles you with its small, tense concerns. I could not stop thinking about it. I could not put it down ... I finished Golden Deeds with that delicious and rare feeling: that I was in the presence of a proper, grown-up storyteller who cared not a toss for gimmicks or manifestoes, but dared instead to put her case with real authorial power and verve".

The Transformation, Chidgey's third novel, was published in 2003, and that year she was named New Zealand's best novelist under forty by The New Zealand Listener. The book tells the story of a shadowy Parisian wig-maker who flees to Tampa, Florida in the 1890s. The Sunday Times said that "Chidgey spins a horror story which, miraculously avoiding easy sensationalism, is both troubling and haunting", and the New Zealand Herald said it was "her third and best so far ... Chidgey could tackle any subject and produce something wonderful from it. She has that gift of the imagination that finds metaphor, contiguity and paradox wherever she looks, and a seemingly innate feel for structuring events, times and historical detail to make one whole, satisfying narrative out of a myriad unexpected parts". The Sunday Express remarked, "This really is a novel to get lost in ... A highly original read, as beautiful as it is terrifying, which manages to be riotously chilling without ever going over the top".

=== Later novels ===
Chidgey's fourth novel, The Wish Child, set in Nazi Germany, was published in New Zealand in 2016 and was a bestseller, winning the 2017 Acorn Foundation Fiction Prize at the Ockham New Zealand Book Awards—the country's richest literary prize.

Her fifth book was released in November 2017. A 'found' novel, The Beat of the Pendulum was written during 2016, with Chidgey drawing on newspaper articles, Facebook posts, emails, radio broadcasts, books, street signs and conversations to create an entry for every day of the year. Radio New Zealand selected it as a Best Book of 2017, calling it "Important in terms of its form as much as its content ... sensationally clever writing ... an enormously skilled writer who totally gets the craft". It was longlisted for the Ockham New Zealand Book Awards and was published in the UK by Lightning Books in 2019.

Chidgey's sixth book, Remote Sympathy, was published in 2020, and like The Wish Child is set in Nazi Germany. It was shortlisted for the 2021 Ockham New Zealand Book Awards. It was a Sunday Times Book of the Month, and was described by The Guardian as "immersive, profound and beautifully plotted". Publishers Weekly praised Chidgey's exploration of the intersecting stories of former Nazis and Holocaust survivors, concluding: "With its multiple registers and complex view of humanity, this marks a vital turn in Holocaust literature". It was one of New Zealand's top ten best-selling novels in 2021, was shortlisted for the 2022 International Dublin Literary Award, and was longlisted for the 2022 Women's Prize for Fiction. In 2022 it was named by The Guardian as one of the best books of the year.

In October 2022, her seventh novel, The Axeman's Carnival, was published. Set in Central Otago, the novel tells the story of the relationship of a farming couple and is narrated by a magpie called Tama. Chidgey drew from her husband's family's farming experiences in writing the novel. Rachael King, reviewing the book for Newsroom, described it as "remarkable, brilliant, a classic in the making", with Tama's voice providing "dark poetry, dramatic irony, startling wisdom and trickster delights". The book was second on the list of New Zealand fiction bestsellers in 2023, and won New Zealand's top book award, the Jann Medlicott Acorn Prize for Fiction, at the 2023 Ockham New Zealand Book Awards.

In 2023, her eighth novel, Pet, a thriller about the relationship between a 12-year-old girl and her schoolteacher, was published in New Zealand, the UK and the United States. Ruth Franklin in The New York Times called it a "lingering, haunting book", and "a landmark in the small but potent canon of contemporary novels about unusual girls reckoning with themselves and the world around them". It was the fifth best-selling fiction book in New Zealand in 2023. Along with The Axeman's Carnival, it was long-listed for the 2024 International Dublin Literary Award.

Her ninth novel, The Book of Guilt, was published in 2025. Set in an alternative dystopian version of 1970s England, the novel is primarily narrated by one of three identical triplets raised in a children's home. Claire Mabey in The Spinoff described the novel as asking the reader to question "what it means to be alive in a human body that can learn, dream and think for itself", while grappling with contemporary political themes of dehumanisation and morality. The Guardian described it as a "compulsively readable story that raises profound questions", although noted that it would inevitably be compared to Never Let Me Go by Kazuo Ishiguro. It was selected as one of the top books of 2025 by Amazon and People magazine.

The Starving Bride, Chidgey's tenth novel, was published in 2026 by Te Herenga Waka University Press in New Zealand and Hachette in the United Kingdom.

In October 2026, Chidgey was made an Arts Foundation of New Zealand Laureate.

== Other works ==
As of 2022, Chidgey is a senior lecturer of creative writing at the University of Waikato and has also taught at the Manukau Institute of Technology. In her role at Waikato she founded the Sargeson Prize, New Zealand's richest short story competition.

Chidgey has translated more than a dozen children's picture books from the German for Gecko Press. In November 2019, OneTree House published her first original picture book, Jiffy, Cat Detective, illustrated by Astrid Matijasevich. A follow-up, Jiffy's Greatest Hits, was published in 2022.

== Awards and honours ==
- 1997 Adam Foundation Prize for In a Fishbone Church
- 1998 Todd New Writer's Bursary
- 1998 Sargeson Fellowship
- 1999 Betty Trask Award for In a Fishbone Church
- 1999 Best First Book, Commonwealth Writers' Prize (South East Asia and Pacific Region) for In a Fishbone Church
- 2001 Katherine Mansfield Memorial Fellowship to Menton, France
- 2002 Prize in Modern Letters
- 2003 Writer in Residence, University of Canterbury
- 2005-6 Robert Burns Fellow, University of Otago
- 2008 Rathcoola Residency, County Cork, Ireland
- 2009 Writer in Residence, University of Waikato
- 2010 University of Otago Wallace Residency, The Pah Homestead, Auckland
- 2012 New Zealand Society of Authors Beatson Fellowship
- 2013 Katherine Mansfield Short Story Award for 'Reverse Living'
- 2017 Acorn Foundation Fiction Prize at the Ockham New Zealand Book Awards for The Wish Child
- 2017 Janet Frame Fiction Prize
- 2018 International Dublin Literary Award (longlisted) for The Wish Child
- 2022 Women's Prize for Fiction (longlisted) for Remote Sympathy
- 2022 International Dublin Literary Award (shortlisted) for Remote Sympathy
- 2023 Jann Medlicott Acorn Prize for Fiction, Ockham New Zealand Book Awards for The Axeman's Carnival
- 2024 International Dublin Literary Award (longlisted) for The Axeman's Carnival and Pet
- 2025 Elizabeth Jolley Short Story Prize (longlisted) for "Inflatable World"

== See also ==
- New Zealand literature
