= Grace Butler =

New Zealand artist (1886-1962)

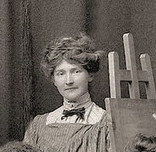
- Grace Butler in 1909 Canterbury School of Arts group photo
- Born: Grace Ellen Cumming; 23 December 1886; Invercargill, New Zealand
- Died: 23 November 1962 (aged 75); Wellington, New Zealand
- Education: Napier Technical School, Canterbury College School of Art (Sydney Thompson)
- Known for: Painting – Landscape painting
- Notable work: 'Glaciers, Rolleston Mountains', 'Bush Trees, Lake Kanieri', 'Governor's Bay', 'Summertime, Arthur's Pass'
- Spouse: Guy Raphael Butler
- Relatives: Helen Brew (daughter)

Grace Ellen Butler (née Cumming, 23 December 1886 – 23 November 1962) was a New Zealand artist.

Butler was known for her landscape paintings of New Zealand and her works are held in the collections of the Canterbury Society of Arts Gallery and Auckland Art Gallery Toi o Tāmaki.

== Early life and family ==
Born Grace Ellen Cumming, in 1886, Richmond Grove, Invercargill, she was the daughter Scottish immigrants, Jane Cameron and William Forbes Cumming, a carter and contractor. Following the death of her father in 1889 her family moved to the North Island and she attended the Norsewood School, where her eldest sister worked as a teacher.

She married Guy Raphael Butler, a law clerk from Poverty Bay, in Gisborne on 1 March 1911 and they settled in Christchurch. The couple went on to have three daughters, including Helen Brew.

== Education ==
From around 1903 until 1907 Butler attended the Napier Technical School and studied art. She also worked at the school as a teacher.

In 1910 she enrolled in the Canterbury College School of Art (now Ilam School of Fine Arts) where she studied until 1914. In her first year at the college she was awarded the Advanced Art Scholarship. During her time at the college she studied under Sydney Thompson, Leonard Booth, Cecil Kelly, and Richard Wallwork. Throughout her life Butler continued to be influenced by Sydney Thompson, attending his classes in 1923–1925.

== Career ==
In 1915 Butler became a working member of the Canterbury Society of Arts and began to exhibit regularly with New Zealand art societies. As well as the Canterbury Society of Arts she exhibited with the Auckland Society of Arts, New Zealand Academy of Fine Arts, Otago Art Society, and The Group (1934). Butler regularly exhibited with the exhibited Canterbury Society of Arts until 1960.

Works by Butler were included in the London British Empire Exhibition in London (1924) and the New Zealand and South Seas Exhibition, taking place in Dunedin, 1925 – 1926.

In 1916 and 1920 the Canterbury Society of Arts acquired two of her landscapes for its permanent collection. Works by Butler are also held at the Auckland Art Gallery Toi o Tāmaki including Glaciers, Rolleston Mountains (presented to the museum in 1922), Bush Trees, Lake Kanieri, and Governor's Bay. Other notable works by Butler include Summertime, Arthur's Pass (c. 1945).

=== Landscape painting ===
Butler became well known for her landscapes. The critic James Shelley praised her work saying, "No artist in New Zealand had quite the same sympathy with our alpine scenery" and fellow painter Olivia Spencer Bower saw her as, "one of the first women who bothered about New Zealand scenery."

Many of her landscapes were of the area around Otira. She first traveled to the region in 1916 and then visited regularly after she and her husband purchased a cabin at Arthur's Pass.

Butler was committed to the en plein air method and often worked in adverse conditions at remote sites. The relation of light to tone and colour were key elements in her landscapes. From the late 1920s she was increasingly influenced by the work of the impressionists and her painting style became freer and looser.
