= Helen Brew =

New Zealand actor and activist (1922–2013)

Helen Brew MBE
- Born: Helen Jean Butler; 22 November 1922; New Brighton, Christchurch, New Zealand
- Died: 12 January 2013 (aged 90); Waikanae, New Zealand
- Education: Avonside Girls' High School
- Alma mater: Christchurch Teachers' Training College
- Occupations: Actor; Birth campaigner; Documentary filmmaker; Educator; Speech therapist
- Spouse: Quentin Brew (m. 1945; div. 1969)
- Children: 3
- Relatives: Grace Butler (mother)

Helen Jean Brew MBE (née Butler; 22 November 1922 – 12 January 2013) was a New Zealand actor, birth campaigner, documentary filmmaker, educator and speech therapist for children. She developed a belief that most of Western society's dysfunction to its approach to childbirth created stress and suffering for women in childbirth and in 1952 co-established the Natural Childbirth Group that later became Parents Centres New Zealand. Brew taught pregnant women informal antenatal classes and she travelled to China, Israel, Europe and Tibet during her career. She made film documentaries such as Birth with R.D. Laing and had a role in the soap opera Close to Home in 1975.

== Early life and education ==
Brew's birth was on 22 November 1922 in New Brighton, a suburb of Christchurch. She was the second daughter of the landscape artist Grace Ellen Cumming and the solicitor Guy Butler, who edited the Gazette Law Reports. Brew was brought up in Christchurch. She was educated at Avonside Girls' High School, which was called Christchurch Training College, and excelled in sport. Brew also went to New Brighton School. Starting from 1941, Brew matriculated to Christchurch Teachers' Training College, studying geology and psychology. She also studied at Christchurch's speech therapy language centre developing theories to correct child speech defects by treating the child as a whole. Brew became interested in the Indian spiritual teacher Jiddu Krishnamurti's teachings, became influenced by the psychologist Maurice Bevan-Brown and alternative medical practices.

== Career ==
She was an amateur actor in productions by the Canterbury Repertory Theatre and worked in Napier for 18 months as a speech therapist in the education department. Brew's experiences of childbirth in hospital which saw her not receive much information of care and kindness during labour combined with her previous work with children who had difficulty with their speech led her to become interested in psychology. She develop a belief most of the dysfunction in Western society caused by its approach to childbirth created stress and suffering for women in childbirth and early childhood as well as babies and their extended family. Brew spoke about giving birth to her third child at home during a meeting of the Family Planning Association in 1951. This gave her a reputation of being a natural childbirth advocate and taught pregnant women informal antenatal classes at her home after they urged her how to have a more natural home birth.

In 1952, Brew and Christine Cole Catley co-established the Natural Childbirth Group in Wellington, which subsequently became Parents Centres New Zealand. She became a lecturer, submissions author, and a doctor, hospital board and Parliament lobbyist. Brew was the Wellington centre's president between 1957 and 1962 and then dominion adviser in 1975. Brew presented a paper to the inaugural New Zealand Early Childhood Care and Development Convention in 1975, which reported the group's aspirations were now Ministry of Health policy. She made the 1973 television series Issues for Parents, which featured unscripted discussions with parents of children under the age of seven with networked group discussions by the National Council of Adult Education across New Zealand complementing it. She portrayed the matriarch in the soap opera Close to Home in 1975.

Between 1972 and 1974, Brew travelled on a partial McKenzie Education Foundation grant to Europe and Israel, meeting and interviewing several key early childhood and psychiatric figures such as the psychiatrist R. D. Laing. She was influenced by Laing's methods and became a founding trustee of the New Zealand Trust for the Foundations of Mental Health. Brew produced the award-winning 1978 documentary Birth with R.D. Laing about its perception that Western society's childbirth practices was cruel and caused damage to community mental health in the long-term. After finishing a film-making course, from 1983 to 1985, she produced the multi-million, six-hour series called The Foundations of Life and researched human nature and early life influences. Brew went to China with help from the Chinese government backed Chinese Film Co-Production Corporation and made the films The One Child Family and China in Change.

Starting from approximately 1986, she planned the documentary series Blueprint for Survival to be filmed in China and Tibet in the anticipation of including books, films and television programmes. Brew remortgaged the family home to finance the project, when she could not find the money for it. She intended to show that people in Western civilisation had become disconnected from family and spiritualism and hoped to influence humanity to "close the gap between the cultures of East and West, shedding light on the problems of our violent and disordered world, uplifting the inner spirit of mankind." Although Brew conducted multiple interviews and research, the project was never completed. She was a member of the Christchurch Psychological Society.

== Personal life ==
From 30 April 1945 to 1969, she was married to child psychologist Quentin Brew, with whom she had three children. In the 1996 New Year Honours, Brew was appointed a Member of the Order of the British Empire, for services to the community. She was diagnosed with dementia in 2000 and was cared for at home until she was moved into the specialist dementia care home Millvale House in Waikanae in 2005. On 12 January 2013, Brew died at the care home with members of her family present. She was given a funeral service ten days later at Waikanae Funeral Home Chapel.

== Legacy ==
Diana Dekker of The Dominion Post wrote of Brew's legacy: "She did not change the world. The films she intended as the instrument of global change came up against too many obstacles, mostly financial, and human nature remained as perverse as ever. But she was heard and had impact overseas and she was the instrument of significant social change in New Zealand." The Alexander Turnbull Library of the National Library of New Zealand holds a collection of 292 folders containing items connected to Brew from 1930 to 2010 donated to it by her son in January 2014. They include her personal and work papers as well as her personal correspondence and audio recording transcripts. Brew was added to the Dictionary of New Zealand Biography in December 2020.
