= Maurice Bevan-Brown =

New Zealand psychiatrist and psychotherapist

Charles Maurice Bevan-Brown (29 July 1886 – 27 February 1967) was a New Zealand psychiatrist and psychotherapist who practised in Christchurch from the 1940s to the 1960s. He established a clinic for medical psychology and founded the New Zealand Association of Psychotherapists. He was influential in the formation and ethos of Parents' Centres New Zealand.

== Early life ==
He was the eldest son of Charles Edmund Bevan-Brown ("Balbus"), headmaster for 37 years of Christchurch Boys High School. He graduated from Canterbury College of the University of New Zealand in 1908 and took honours in the National Science Tripos at Cambridge, England, in 1912. Returning to New Zealand he taught at Wanganui Collegiate, until 1915, when he enlisted as a sergeant and was posted with the medical corps to Egypt, landing at Suez on July 27. He was admitted to hospital in Cairo with influenza, then paratyphoid fever, and returned to New Zealand on January 1, 1916.

He graduated M.B. Ch.B. from Otago University in 1921, and returned to London on a Medical Travelling Scholarship, registering as a medical practitioner on August 10, 1923. From 1926 to 1940 he practised as a psychiatrist in London, and worked with J. A. Hadfield, Ian Dishart Suttie, Crichton Miller, John Macmurray, Edward Glover, Carl Jung, Alfred Adler, Wilhelm Stekel and others. For 17 years he was physician (i.e. psychiatrist) on the staff of the Tavistock Clinic in London.

Dr John Hardwick-Smith remembered him as being part of a group considered "the lunatic fringe" at the Tavistock because they saw "the whole of psychopathology as centred around the child at the breast", though less so than Melanie Klein.

In 1934 he delivered the presidential address to the Medical Society of Psychology in London, a "Plea for Correlation" between the theories of Freud, Jung and Adler. In 1940 he returned to New Zealand.

== Christchurch Psychological Society ==
In the winter of 1942 Dr Bevan-Brown gave a series of lectures on mental health to the Christchurch Workers' Educational Association. At the concluding lecture Professor R. S. Allan of Canterbury University College proposed the establishment of a Mental Health Club. In 1946, it was renamed the Christchurch Psychological Society.

Mary Dobbie says in her history of Parents' Centres New Zealand that Bevan-Brown was the centre of a "ferment" of controversy among psychology students in staid Christchurch in the 1940s.

In 1943, he spoke at the annual conference of the Christchurch branch of the New Education Fellowship and again as a key speaker at a public meeting, against corporal punishment of children, saying it was "dangerous to mental health and not conducive to true discipline". Canterbury teachers regarded this as "a slur on the profession" and the Education Board's senior inspector complained to the Director of Education, that "the Fellowship was being used to advertise one man".

With no interest being shown in "war neurosis" (posttraumatic stress disorder) by local medical practitioners in 1944, or the unrealistic expectations on soldiers returning from World War 2, Bevan-Brown enlisted a group of laypeople who formed the Christchurch War Neurosis Group. In 1945, two of Bevan-Brown's friends, the Rev. Frank A. Cook and Dr Enid Cook, turned part of their Armagh St home into the Cranmer House Clinic, primarily for the treatment of "war neurosis", with Bevan-Brown as senior physician. In 1950 they moved to a house at 29 Andover Street and called it "the Clinic for Medical Psychology".

Bevan-Brown came into conflict with the Plunket Society's paediatrician and co-author of its handbook Modern Mothercraft, Dr Helen Deem, when he told her in 1945 that his work had led him to take an interest in child welfare and particularly the activities of the Plunket Society. She said that though she realised the importance of practical psychology in child welfare, she considered the amateur child psychologist "a blight on the community". In his turn, Bevan-Brown criticised the "pernicious and fallacious pseudoscientific views" that indoctrinated mothers into leaving their babies to cry, ignoring their maternal instincts.

Bevan-Brown and Enid Cook were on the panel of editors of the influential American bi-monthly Child-Family Digest, alongside the writings of Grantly Dick-Read, Ashley Montague and James Clark Maloney.

== New Zealand Association of Psychotherapists ==
In 1947 Bevan-Brown called a meeting at which the New Zealand Association of Psychotherapists was set up, with him as its first president. The association's website says its aims remain "substantially the same" today.

A 1996 history of the association, in a nine-page section headed "The Bevan-Brown Era", describes him as outstanding for his "warmth of personality, breadth of educational background, quality and variety of professional experience" and his "major contribution to mental health, psychiatry and psychotherapy".

Professor Wallace Ironside, then professor of psychological medicine at Monash University, Melbourne, thought Bevan-Brown was "impressive" with "a Viking quality" to his appearance, but the dean of medicine at the University of Otago warned him to steer clear of Bevan-Brown for the sake of his reputation: doctors thought Bevan-Brown "somewhat eccentric and perhaps a bit off the planet".

Daily visiting of children in hospitals was an issue taken up by Bevan-Brown in 1950. It had been hospital policy to keep parents away for the days or weeks a child might need for treatment. He argued that this was not just cruel but would cause psychological problems. The North Canterbury Hospital Board was unimpressed, the chief paediatrician at Christchurch Hospital putting an advertisement in the Christchurch Press headed "Do Mothers Want to Kill their Children?" — the implication being that parents would take germs into the hospitals if they visited.

== The Sources of Love and Fear ==
Bevan-Brown published two books. In The Sources of Love and Fear, he emphasised the importance of early influences (especially maternal) on later development. It stressed fear as a source of disease, and love as a source of good. He promoted natural childbirth, fathers being present at childbirth, breastfeeding on demand, and opposed infant circumcision ("this rather barbaric rite"), corporal punishment and leaving babies alone to cry. He also referred to those influences in connection with both masturbation and homosexuality A review of The Sources of Love and Fear in the periodical Landfall said it would be of particular value to people confused about the issues, in view of the controversy aroused by the Cranmer House Clinic and the Christchurch Psychological Society. Sue Kedgely subtitled a chapter of her history of motherhood in New Zealand, "Spock, Bowlby and [Bevan-]Brown". In it she reports Helen Brew as saying The Sources of Love and Fear spread "like a forest fire" and quickly went out of print, sending "shockwaves through the medical and psychological professions" which then dismissed him as a crank. The 1960 edition of The Sources of Love and Fear includes a review of the earlier editions by Grantly Dick Read [sic: no hyphen], calling it "a most acceptable book" whose value goes beyond the medical field into sociology, that should be studied by everyone concerned with the well-being of mother and child.

Helen Deem of the Plunket Society declined to review the book, saying it would not be in the interests of the Plunket Society for her to do so, because some of its contentions, based on psychoanalysis, were highly controversial. Linda Bryder's history of the Plunket Society says it can't have helped that a contributor to the book said some of the advice of Plunket nurses filled her with "horror ... dismay and despair". Psychiatrist Dr Ian McDougall commented in 1996 that the book now feels old fashioned and slightly preachy, but much in its basic messages is "consistent with contemporary attachment theory, object relations and self psychology" and it "contributed significantly to the changes we take for granted 50 years later".

Central to Bevan-Brown's thinking was the importance of the sensuous mother-child breastfeeding relationship, going so far as to say that there were "risks attaching to the development of any baby who has the misfortune not to be breast-fed. [His emphasis] Freud had used the word "sexual" to describe the feelings experienced by both the mother and the infant in this "copulative" process, but he preferred to use the word "sensuous". The Plunket Society would have none of that, supporting breastfeeding for the physical well-being it promoted which was conducive to sounder psychological well-being, "but would go no further towards psychological benefit".

In the 1960 edition of The Sources of Love and Fear, Bevan-Brown added a preface saying Dr Wattie Whittlestone of the Ruakura Agricultural Research Centre in Hamilton, a world expert in lactation, had confirmed from his own experiments on mammals what Bevan-Brown had said about the emotional elements in breast-feeding. Dr Whittlestone confirmed this at a memorial lecture for Bevan-Brown in 1967, saying physiology now shows that "suckling does, indeed, bring about physiological changes ... identical with those associated with love."

Bevan-Brown's other book, Mental Health and Personality Disorder was a compilation of his essays and talks.

== Parents' Centres ==
Following their own unhappy experiences with hospital birth, Helen Brew and Christine Cole founded the Natural Childbirth Association in Wellington in 1952, with Bevan-Brown as one of the "innovative thinkers" who advised them, but the negative reaction to that name made them quickly change it to Wellington Parents' Centre. Helen Brew had been still at high school when she heard Bevan-Brown lecture, and was "hugely impressed". His teaching greatly influenced the philosophy and direction of Parents' Centres in dealing with growing disquiet among mothers concerned about hospital childbirth's effects on them and their children. The first national Parents' Centres conference was held at the hall of the Andover Street clinic, with participants on mattresses, marae style.

"Rooming-in" - newborn babies sharing a room with their mothers from birth onward - was an issue that divided Bevan-Brown and the Parents' Centres from the medical profession when the Centres considered federating at their conference in 1957, and needed official recognition. Professor Harvey Carey of National Women's Hospital supported rooming-in, but not for psychological reasons: he did not think a baby suffered from anxiety when it is born because it did not yet have a fully developed consciousness; parts of the brain were not yet developed. Bevan-Brown challenged him, asking "Where in the nervous system do you localise love?"

Helen Brew describes Bevan-Brown as having "a quality of innocent bewilderment" at the amount of resistance to so many obviously healthy, sane and reasonable things he advocated. She said Sir Truby King came to Christchurch to ask Bevan-Brown to take over the Plunket Society. Linda Bryder comments that King had no authority to make such an offer and the council would probably not have agreed because Bevan-Brown had resigned from the NZBMA, and his role would have cut Plunket Society off from the medical establishment. Sue Kedgely calls the offer ironic, and if Bevan-Brown had taken over, the Plunket Society "would undoubtedly have taken a very different course". [King died in 1938.]

For many years Bevan-Brown maintained 30 acres (12.1 hectares) of native bush at Kowai (now Kowai Bush), 6 km north of Springfield. For this the New Zealand Forest and Bird Protection Society awarded him its Bledisloe Medal in 1961. He was a keen mountaineer who reportedly climbed the Matterhorn "many times", and had a good bass voice. He was a heavy smoker.

He died in Christchurch aged 80, survived by two daughters. Two younger brothers, Frederic Vivian Bevan-Brown and Robin E. Bevan-Brown, both also doctors, predeceased him. The Clinic for Medical Psychology closed after his death. His papers are held by the Cotter Medical History Trust.
