= Janet Frame =

New Zealand author (1924–2004)

Janet Frame ONZ CBE
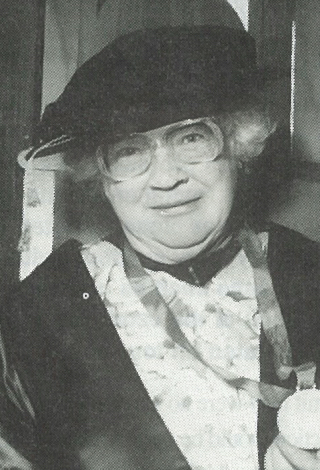
- Frame in 1993
- Born: Janet Paterson Frame; 28 August 1924; Dunedin, New Zealand
- Died: 29 January 2004 (aged 79); Dunedin, New Zealand
- Occupations: Novelist; short story writer; essayist; poet
- Writing career
- Language: English
- Genres: Modernism, magic realism, postmodernism
- Notable work: An Angel at My Table
- Website: janetframe.org.nz

Janet Paterson Frame (28 August 1924 – 29 January 2004) was a New Zealand author. She is internationally renowned for her work, which includes novels, short stories, poetry, juvenile fiction, and an autobiography, and received numerous awards including being appointed to the Order of New Zealand, New Zealand's highest civil honour.

Frame's celebrity derived from her dramatic personal history as well as her literary career. Following years of psychiatric hospitalisation, Frame was scheduled for a lobotomy that was cancelled when, just days before the procedure, her debut publication of short stories was unexpectedly awarded a national literary prize. Many of her novels and short stories explore her childhood and psychiatric hospitalisation from a fictional perspective, and her award-winning three-volume autobiography was adapted into the film An Angel at My Table (1990), directed by Jane Campion.

== Biography ==
=== Early years: 1924–1956 ===
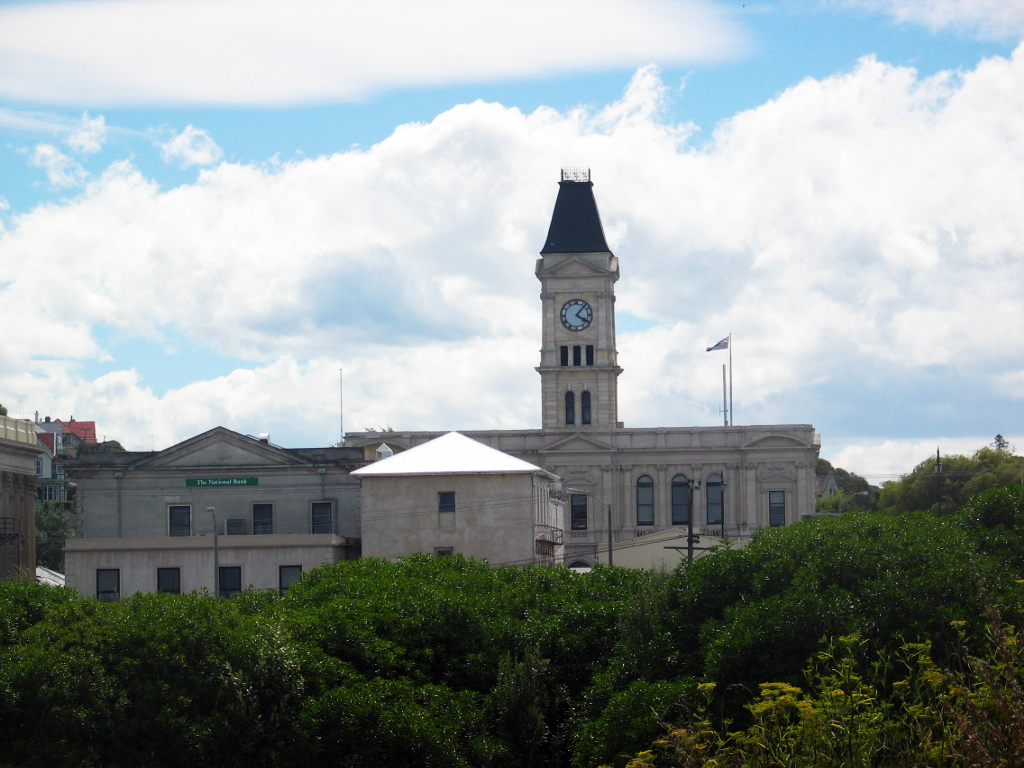
Oamaru: Clock tower on the old Post Office, described in Frame's Owls Do Cry and her autobiography, The Envoy from Mirror City

Janet Frame was born Janet Paterson Frame in Dunedin in the south-east of New Zealand's South Island, the third of five children to parents of Scottish descent. She grew up in a working-class family. Her father, George Frame, worked for the New Zealand Government Railways, and her mother Lottie (née Godfrey), served as a housemaid to the family of writer Katherine Mansfield. New Zealand's first female medical graduate, Dr Emily Hancock Siedeberg, delivered Frame at St. Helens Hospital in 1924.

Frame spent her early childhood years in various small towns in New Zealand's South Island provinces of Otago and Southland, including Outram and Wyndham, before the family eventually settled in the coastal town of Oamaru (recognisable as the "Waimaru" of her début novel and subsequent fiction). As recounted in the first volume of her autobiographies, Frame's childhood was marred by the deaths of two of her adolescent sisters, Myrtle and Isabel, who drowned in separate incidents, and the epileptic seizures suffered by her brother George (referred to as "Geordie" and "Bruddie").

In 1943, Frame began training as a teacher at the Dunedin College of Education, auditing courses in English, French and psychology at the adjacent University of Otago. After completing two years of theoretical studies with mixed results, Frame started a year of practical placement at the Arthur Street School in Dunedin, which, according to her biographer, initially went quite well. Things started to unravel later that year when she attempted suicide by ingesting a packet of aspirin. As a result, Frame began regular therapy sessions with junior lecturer John Money, to whom she developed a strong attraction, and whose later work as a sexologist specialising in gender reassignment remains controversial.

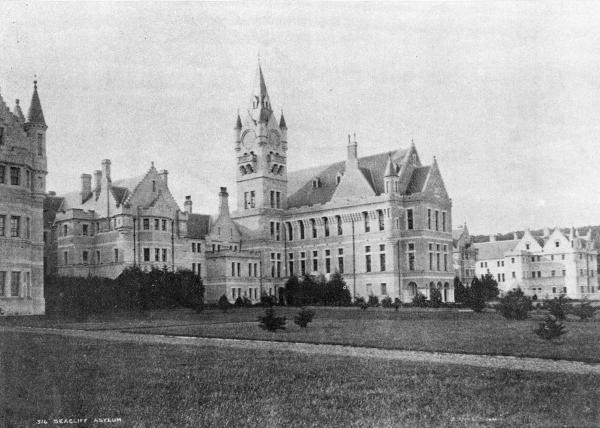
Seacliff Lunatic Asylum in the Otago region, where Frame was first committed in 1945.

In September 1945, Frame abandoned her teacher-training classroom at Dunedin's Arthur Street School during a visit from an inspector. She was then briefly admitted to the psychiatric ward of the local Dunedin hospital for observation. Frame was unwilling to return home to her family, where tensions between her father and brother frequently manifested in outbursts of anger and violence. As a result, Frame was transferred from the local hospital's psychiatric ward to Seacliff Lunatic Asylum, a fabled and feared mental institution located 20 miles north of Dunedin. During the next eight years, Frame was repeatedly readmitted, usually voluntarily, to psychiatric hospitals in New Zealand. In addition to Seacliff, these included Avondale Lunatic Asylum, in Auckland, and Sunnyside Hospital in Christchurch. During this period, Frame was first diagnosed as suffering from schizophrenia, which was treated with electroconvulsive therapy and insulin.

Owls Do Cry. Dennis Beytagh's cover illustration for Frame's début novel, released by New Zealand's Pegasus Press in 1957.

In 1951, while Frame was still a patient at Seacliff, New Zealand's Caxton Press published her first book, a critically acclaimed collection of short stories titled The Lagoon and Other Stories. The volume was awarded the Hubert Church Memorial Award, at that time one of New Zealand's most prestigious literary prizes. This resulted in the cancellation of Frame's scheduled lobotomy. Four years later, after her final discharge from Seacliff, Frame met writer Frank Sargeson. She lived and worked at his home in Takapuna, an Auckland suburb, from April 1955 to July 1956, producing her first full-length novel, Owls Do Cry (Pegasus, 1957).

== Literary career ==
=== 1957–1989 ===
Frame left New Zealand in late 1956, and the next seven years were most prolific in terms of publication. She lived and worked in Europe, primarily based in London, with brief sojourns to Ibiza and Andorra. In May 1958 she legally changed her name to Nene Janet Paterson Clutha, in part to make herself more difficult to locate and in part to recognise Māori leader Tamati Waka Nene, whom she admired, and the Clutha River, which was a source of creative inspiration. Frame still struggled with anxiety and depression, and in September 1958 admitted herself to the Maudsley in London. American-trained psychiatrist Alan Miller, who studied under John Money at Johns Hopkins University, proposed that she had never suffered from schizophrenia. In an effort to alleviate the ill effects of her years spent in and out of psychiatric hospitals, Frame then began regular therapy sessions with psychiatrist Robert Hugh Cawley, who encouraged her to pursue her writing. Frame dedicated seven of her novels to Cawley.

Frame returned to New Zealand in 1963, though not before spending a short period of time living in rural north Suffolk (near the town of Eye) which gave her the inspiration for her 1965 novel The Adaptable Man. She accepted the Burns Fellowship at the University of Otago in 1965. She later lived in several parts of New Zealand's North Island, including Auckland, Taranaki, Wanganui, the Horowhenua, Palmerston North, Waiheke, Stratford, Browns Bay and Levin.

During this period Frame travelled extensively, occasionally to Europe, but principally to the United States, where she accepted residencies at the MacDowell and Yaddo artists' colonies. Partly as a result of these extended stays in the U.S., Frame developed close relationships with several Americans. These included the painter Theophilus Brown (whom she later referred to as "the chief experience of my life") and his long-time partner Paul John Wonner, the poet May Sarton, John Phillips Marquand and Alan Lelchuk. Frame's one-time university tutor/counsellor and longtime friend John Money worked in North America from 1947 onwards, and Frame frequently based herself at his home in Baltimore.

In the 1980s Frame authored three volumes of autobiography (To the Is-land, An Angel at my Table and The Envoy from Mirror City) which collectively traced the course of her life to her return to New Zealand in 1963. The Australian novelist Patrick White described the first two volumes as "amongst the wonders of the world". Director Jane Campion and screenwriter Laura Jones adapted the trilogy for television broadcast. It was eventually released as an award-winning feature film, An Angel at My Table. Actresses Kerry Fox, Alexia Keogh and Karen Fergusson portrayed the author at various ages. Frame's autobiographies sold better than any of her previous publications, and Campion's successful film adaptation of the texts introduced a new generation of readers to her work. These successes increasingly pushed Frame into the public eye.

In the 1983 Queen's Birthday Honours, Frame was appointed a Commander of the Order of the British Empire, for services to literature. That year, To the Is-land also received the Goodman Fielder Wattie Book of the Year Award, the top literary prize in New Zealand.

Frame intended the autobiographies to "set the record straight" regarding her past and in particular her mental status. However, critical and public speculation has continued to focus on her mental health. In 2007, after Frame's death, The New Zealand Medical Journal published an article by a medical specialist who proposed that Frame may have been on the autism spectrum, a suggestion that was disputed by the author's literary executor.

During her lifetime, Frame's work was principally published by American firm George Braziller, garnering numerous literary prizes in her native New Zealand, and the Commonwealth Writers' Prize in 1989 for her final novel, The Carpathians.

=== 1990–2000 ===
On 6 February 1990, Frame was the sixteenth appointee to the Order of New Zealand, the nation's highest civil honour. Frame also held foreign membership of the American Academy of Arts and Letters and, in her native New Zealand, received two honorary doctorates as well as the status of cultural icon. Rumours occasionally circulated portraying Frame as a contender for the Nobel Prize in Literature, most notably in 1998, after a journalist spotted her name at the top of a list later revealed to have been in alphabetical order, and again five years later, in 2003, when Åsa Beckman, the influential chief literary critic at the Swedish daily Dagens Nyheter, wrongly predicted that Frame would win the prestigious prize.

Frame's writing became the focus of academic criticism from the late 1970s, with approaches ranging from Marxist and social realist, to feminist and poststructuralist. In later years, book-length monographs on Frame were published. These included Patrick Evans’s bio-critical contribution for the "Twayne's World Authors Series," Janet Frame (1977), Gina Mercer's feminist reading of the novels and autobiographies, Janet Frame: Subversive Fictions (1994), and Judith Dell Panny's allegorical approach to the works, I have what I gave: The fiction of Janet Frame (1992). A collection of essays edited by Jeanne Delbaere was first published in 1978, with a revised edition released under the title The Ring of Fire: Essays on Janet Frame in 1992. That same year, Dunedin's University of Otago hosted a conference dedicated to a discussion of Frame's work. Many of the papers were published in a special issue of The Journal of New Zealand Literature.

Wrestling with the Angel. The front cover of New Zealand historian Michael King's award-winning biography on Frame, first published in 2000.

In 2000, New Zealand historian Michael King published his authorised biography of Frame, Wrestling with the Angel. The book was simultaneously released in New Zealand and North America, with British and Australian editions appearing in later years. King's award-winning and exhaustive work attracted both praise and criticism. Some questioned the extent to which Frame guided the hand of her biographer, while others argued that he had failed to come to terms with the complexity and subtlety of his subject. Adding to the controversy, King openly admitted that he withheld information "that would have been a source of embarrassment and distress to her," and that he adopted publisher Christine Cole Catley's notion of "compassionate truth." This advocates "a presentation of evidence and conclusions that fulfil the major objectives of biography, but without the revelation of information that would involve the living subject in unwarranted embarrassment, loss of face, emotional or physical pain, or a nervous or psychiatric collapse." King defended his project and maintained that future biographies on Frame would eventually fill in the gaps left by his own work.

=== Death and posthumous publications ===
Frame died in Dunedin in January 2004, aged 79, from acute myeloid leukaemia, shortly after becoming one of the first recipients of the Arts Foundation of New Zealand Icon Awards, established to celebrate and acknowledge New Zealand artists who have achieved the highest standards of artistic expression. A number of works have been published posthumously, including a volume of poetry titled The Goose Bath, which was awarded New Zealand's top poetry prize in 2007. This generated a minor controversy among critics who felt the posthumous prize "set an awkward precedent". A novella, Towards Another Summer, also published posthumously, was inspired by a weekend Frame spent with British journalist Geoffrey Moorhouse and his family. In 2008, two previously unpublished short stories set in mental hospitals appeared in The New Yorker. Another previously unpublished short story was carried in The New Yorker in 2010. In March 2011, the New Zealand branch of Penguin Books acquired the rights to publish three new editions of Frame's work. These were: Janet Frame in Her Own Words (2011), a collection of interviews and nonfiction, Gorse is Not People: New and Uncollected Stories (2012) (published in the US as Between My Father and the King: New and Uncollected Stories), and the novel In the Memorial Room (2013).

In 2010, Gifted, a novel by New Zealand academic and former Frame biographer Patrick Evans, was published and subsequently shortlisted for the Commonwealth Writers' Prize. The story is a fictionalised account of the relationship between Janet Frame and Frank Sargeson during her time living as a guest on his Takapuna property in 1955–56 – an era recounted in a number of works by Frame and her contemporaries and dramatised in Campion's film, An Angel at My Table (1990). In 2013, Evans' novel was adapted for the stage, premiering at the Christchurch Arts Festival on 22 August 2013, followed by extended tour of New Zealand's north and south islands. While garnering positive critical reviews, the promotion and staging of the production drew fierce criticism from Frame's literary executor and niece, Pamela Gordon, who maintained it "was designed to demean Frame." Gordon, who has also criticised Campion's film for inaccuracies in its portrayal of Frame, asserted that Evans' theatrical adaptation presented an unfaithful view of her famous relative. Festival organiser Philip Tremewan defended the play, while director Conrad Newport maintained that Gordon was "overprotective of [Frame's] legacy." Evans generally avoided the controversy, stating, "I have publicised her work and popularised it for two to three generations of students. In Gifted, the play and novel, you only have to look at the title to see what my attitude is. I really don't think I have anything to apologise for."

Frame's personal and literary papers were archived by the Hocken Collections of the University of Otago. In 2024, these archives were inscribed on the UNESCO Memory of the World Aotearoa New Zealand Ngā Mahara o te Ao register.

== Bibliography ==
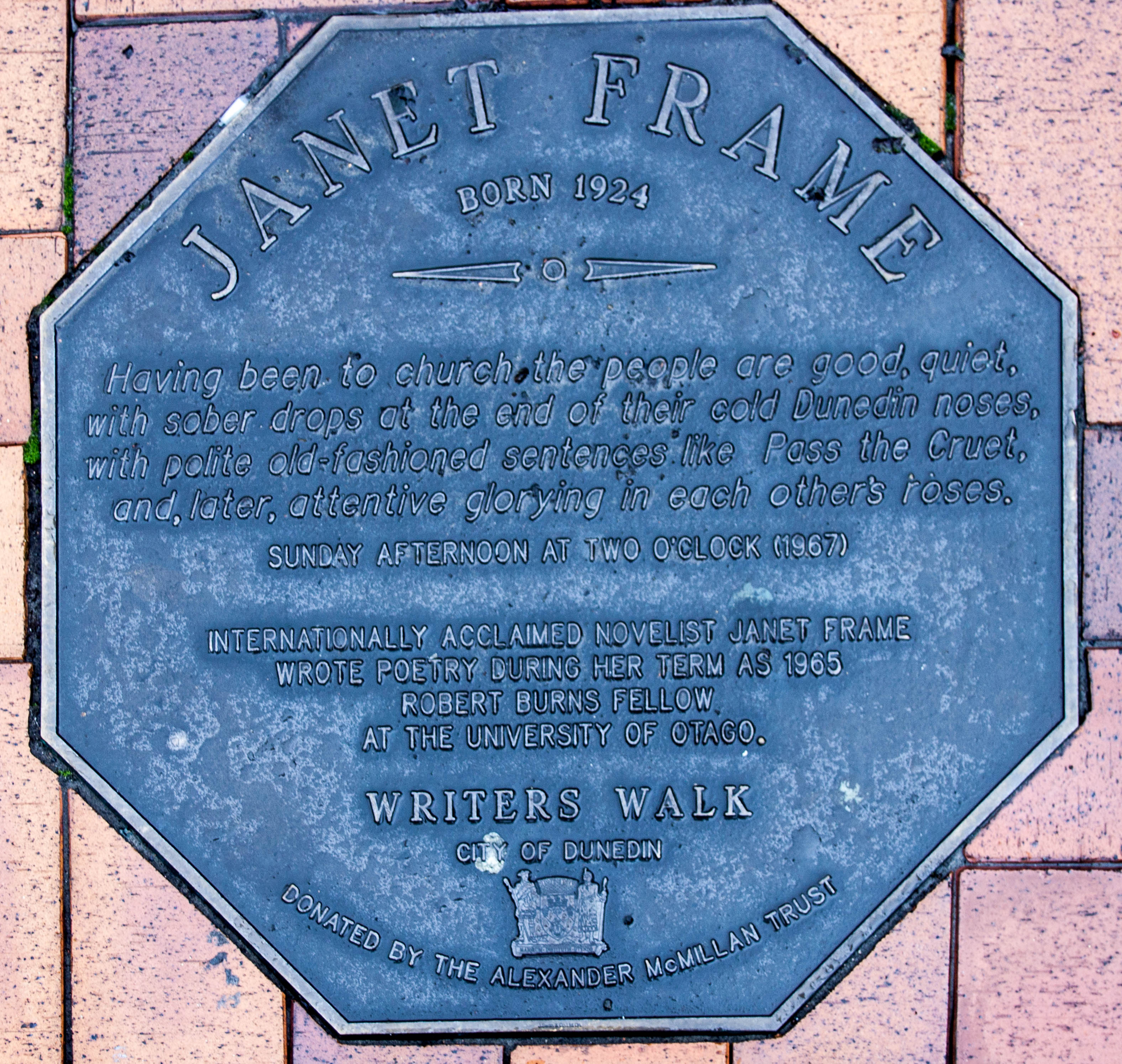
Memorial plaque dedicated to Janet Frame in Dunedin, on the Writers' Walk on the Octagon

=== Novels ===
- 1957 Owls Do Cry. Christchurch: Pegasus Press.
- 1961 Faces in the Water. Christchurch: Pegasus Press; New York: Braziller.
- 1962 The Edge of the Alphabet. Christchurch: Pegasus Press.
- 1963 Scented Gardens for the Blind. London: WH Allen.
- 1965 The Adaptable Man. London: WH Allen.
- 1966 A State of Siege. New York: Braziller. Adapted into a film of the same name (1978), screenplay by Frame, in collaboration with director Vincent Ward producer Tim White, released 1978.
- 1968 The Rainbirds. London: WH Allen. (Published in the US with Frame's preferred original title, Yellow Flowers in the Antipodean Room. New York: Braziller, 1969)
- 1970 Intensive Care. New York: Braziller.
- 1972 Daughter Buffalo. New York: Braziller.
- 1979 Living in the Maniototo. New York: Braziller.
- 1989 The Carpathians. New York: Braziller.
- 2007 Towards Another Summer. Auckland: Vintage ISBN 978-1-86941-868-7 (Posthumously published).
- 2013 In the Memorial Room. Melbourne: Text Publishing. ISBN 978-1-92214-713-4 (written in 1974, published posthumously by her request).

=== Short fiction ===
Collections

- 1951 The Lagoon and Other Stories. Christchurch: Caxton Press. (Mistakenly dated on first edition as 1952)
- 1963. The Reservoir: Stories and Sketches. New York: Braziller
- 1963. Snowman Snowman: Fables and Fantasies. New York: Braziller
- 1966 The Reservoir and Other Stories London: W.H. Allen. Commonwealth edition, selection from The Reservoir: Stories and Sketches and Snowman Snowman: Fables and Fantasies.
- 1983. You Are Now Entering the Human Heart. Wellington: Victoria University Press.
- 2012. Gorse Is Not People. Auckland: Penguin. Posthumous, previously unpublished and uncollected stories. Published in the US as Between My Father and the King. Berkeley: Counterpoint.

=== Children's fiction ===
- 1969. Mona Minim and the Smell of the Sun. (With illustrations by Robin Jacques.) New York: Braziller (Reissued posthumously in 2005 by Random House, New Zealand, with illustrations by David Elliot).

=== Poetry ===
Collections

- 1967. The Pocket Mirror. New York: Braziller.
- 2006. The Goose Bath. Auckland: Random House/Vintage (Posthumously published); (Released in the UK as a collected edition along with selections from The Pocket Mirror under the title Storms Will Tell: Selected Poems. Bloodaxe Books, 2008)
- 2017. Parleranno le tempeste. Mendrisio: Gabriele Capelli Editore (Posthumously published); (Released in Italy and Switzerland as a collected edition along with selections from The Pocket Mirror and The Goose Bath). Italian. Translated by Eleonora Bello and Francesca Benocci. Preface by Pamela Gordon (Janet Frame Literary Trust)

=== Autobiography ===
- 1982. To the Is-Land (Autobiography 1). New York: Braziller.
- 1984. An Angel at My Table (Autobiography 2). New York: Braziller.
- 1984. The Envoy From Mirror City (Autobiography 3). Auckland: Century Hutchinson.
- 1989. An Autobiography (Collected edition). Auckland: Century Hutchinson (Posthumously reprinted under the title An Angel at My Table, London: Virago, 2008).

=== Separately published stories and poems ===
- 1946. "University Entrance" in New Zealand Listener, 22 March 1946.
- 1947. "Alison Hendry" in Landfall 2, June 1947. (Published under the penname "Jan Godfrey"; reprinted in The Lagoon and Other Stories under the title "Jan Godfrey".)
- 1954. "The Waitress" in New Zealand Listener, 9 July 1954
- 1954. "The Liftman" in New Zealand Listener, 13 August 1954
- 1954. "On Paying the Third Installment" in New Zealand Listener, 10 September 1954
- 1954. "Lolly Legs" in New Zealand Listener, 15 October 1954
- 1954. "Trio Concert" in New Zealand Listener, 29 October 1954.
- 1954. "Timothy" in New Zealand Listener, 26 November 1954
- 1955. "The Transformation" in New Zealand Listener, 28 January 1955
- 1956. "The Ferry" in New Zealand Listener, 13 July 1956.
- 1956. "Waiting for Daylight" in Landfall (NZ) 10
- 1956. "I Got Shoes" in New Zealand Listener, 2 November 1956.
- 1957. "Face Downwards in the Grass" in Mate (NZ) 1
- 1957. "The Dead" in Landfall (NZ) 11
- 1957. "The Wind Brother" in School Journal (NZ) 51.1
- 1958. "The Friday Night World" in School Journal (NZ) 52.1
- 1962. "Prizes" in The New Yorker 10 March 1962
- 1962. "The Red-Currant Bush, the Black-Currant Bush, the Gooseberry Bush, the African Thorn Hedge, and the Garden Gate Who Was Once the Head of an Iron Bed" in Mademoiselle April 1962
- 1963. "The Reservoir" in The New Yorker 12 January 1963 (reprinted in The Reservoir: Stories and Sketches)
- 1963. "The Chosen Image" in Vogue, July 1963
- 1964. "The Joiner" in Landfall (NZ) 18
- 1957. "The Road to Takapuna" in Mate (NZ) 12
- 1964. "Scott's Horse" in Landfall (NZ) 18
- 1964. "The Senator Had Plans" in Landfall (NZ) 18
- 1965. "The Bath" in Landfall (NZ) 19 (Reprinted in You Are Now Entering the Human Heart)
- 1966. "A Boy's Will" in Landfall (NZ) 20
- 1966. "White Turnips: A Timely Monologue" in New Zealand Monthly Review May 1966
- 1966. "In Alco Hall" in Harper's Bazaar, November 1966
- 1968. "In Mexico City" in New Zealand Listener, 20 December 1968
- 1969. "You Are Now Entering the Human Heart" in The New Yorker 29 March 1969 (Reprinted in You Are Now Entering the Human Heart)
- 1969. "The Birds of the Air" in Harper's Bazaar, June 1969
- 1969. "Jet Flight" in New Zealand Listener, 8 August 1969
- 1969. "The Words" in Mademoiselle October 1969
- 1970. "Winter Garden" in The New Yorker 31 January 1970
- 1974. "They Never Looked Back" in New Zealand Listener, 23 March 1974
- 1975. "The Painter" in New Zealand Listener, 6 September 1975
- 1976. "Rain on the Roof" in The Journal (NZ), April 1976 (Previously published in The Pocket Mirror)
- 1979. "Insulation" in New Zealand Listener, 17 March 1979
- 1979. "Two Widowers" in New Zealand Listener, 9 June 1979
- 2004. "Three Poems by Janet Frame" in New Zealand Listener, 28 August – 3 September 2004 (Posthumously published) view online
- 2008. "A Night at the Opera" in The New Yorker, 2 June 2008 (Posthumously published) view online
- 2008. "Gorse Is Not People" in The New Yorker, 1 September 2008 (Posthumously published) view online
- 2010. "Gavin Highly" in The New Yorker, 29 March 2010 (Posthumously published) view online

=== Articles, reviews, essays and letters ===
- 1953. "A Letter to Frank Sargeson" in Landfall 25, March 1953
- 1954. "Review of Terence Journet's Take My Tip" in Landfall 32, December 1954
- 1955. "Review of A Fable by William Faulkner" in Parson's Packet, no. 36, October–December 1955
- 1964. "Memory and a Pocketful of Words" in Times Literary Supplement, 4 June 1964
- 1964. "This Desirable Property" in New Zealand Listener, 3 July 1964
- 1965. "Beginnings" in Landfall (NZ) 73, March 1965
- 1968. "The Burns Fellowship" in Landfall (NZ) 87, September 1968
- 1973. "Charles Brasch 1909–1973: Tributes and Memories from His Friends" in Islands (NZ) 5, Spring 1973
- 1975. "Janet Frame on Tales from Grimm" in Education (NZ) 24.9, 1975
- 1982. "Departures and Returns" in G. Amirthanayagan (ed.) Writers in East-West Encounter, London: Macmillan, 1982 (Originally delivered as a paper at the International Colloquium on the Cross-Cultural Encounter in Literature, East-West Center, Honolulu, October 1977).
- 1984. "A last Letter to Frank Sargeson" in Islands (NZ) 33, July

== Awards and honours ==
- 1951: Hubert Church Prose Award (The Lagoon and other Stories)
- 1956: New Zealand Literary Fund Grant
- 1958: New Zealand Literary Fund Award for Achievement (Owls Do Cry)
- 1964: Hubert Church Prose Award (Scented Gardens for the Blind); New Zealand Literary Fund Scholarship in Letters.
- 1965: Robert Burns Fellowship, University of Otago, Dunedin, NZ
- 1967: "Buckland Literary Award." (The Reservoir and Other Stories/A State of Siege)
- 1969: New Zealand Literary Fund Award (The Pocket Mirror: Poems)
- 1971: Buckland Literary Award (Intensive Care); Hubert Church Prose Award. (Intensive Care)
- 1972: President of Honour: P.E.N. International New Zealand Centre, Wellington, NZ
- 1973: James Wattie Book of the Year Award (Daughter Buffalo)
- 1974: Hubert Church Prose Award (Daughter Buffalo); Winn-Manson Menton Fellowship.
- 1978: Honorary Doctor of Literature (D.Litt. Honoris Causa) University of Otago, Dunedin, NZ
- 1979: Buckland Literary Award (Living in the Maniototo)
- 1980: New Zealand Book Award for Fiction (Living in the Maniototo)
- 1983: Buckland Literary Award; Sir James Wattie Book of the Year Award (To the Is-Land); C.B.E. (Commander, Order of the British Empire)
- 1984: Frank Sargeson Fellowship, University of Auckland, NZ
- 1984: New Zealand Book Award for Non-Fiction (An Angel at My Table); Sir James Wattie Book of the Year Award (An Angel at My Table); Turnovsky Prize for Outstanding Achievement in the Arts
- 1985: Sir James Wattie Book of the Year Award (The Envoy from Mirror City)
- 1986: New Zealand Book Award for Non-Fiction (The Envoy from Mirror City); Honorary Foreign Member: The American Academy and Institute of Arts and Letters
- 1989: Ansett New Zealand Book Award for Fiction; Commonwealth Writers Prize for Best Book (The Carpathians)
- 1990: O.N.Z. (Member, Order of New Zealand)
- 1992: Honorary Doctor of Literature (D.Litt.), University of Waikato, Hamilton, NZ
- 1994: Massey University Medal, Massey University, Palmerston North, NZ
- 2003: Arts Foundation of New Zealand Icon Award; New Zealand Prime Minister’s Award for Literary Achievement
- 2007: Montana Book Award for Poetry (The Goose Bath)

== See also ==
- New Zealand literature

== Sources ==
- Cronin, Jan. The Frame Function: An Inside-Out Guide to the Novels of Janet Frame. Auckland University Press (Auckland), 2011.
- Dean, Andrew. Metafiction and the Postwar Novel: Foes, Ghosts and Faces in the Water. Oxford University Press (Oxford), 2021.
- Delbaere, Jeanne, ed. The Ring of Fire. Essays on Janet Frame. Dangaroo Press (Aarhus),1992.
- Evans, Patrick. "Dr. Clutha’s Book of the World: Janet Paterson Frame, 1924–2004." Journal of New Zealand Literature 22: 15–3.
- Finlayson, Claire. "A Bolder Spirit." University of Otago Magazine. (NZ) February 2005: 13–14.
- Frame, Janet. An Autobiography. (collected edition). Auckland: Century Hutchinson, 1989; New York: George Braziller, 1991.
- King, Michael. "The Compassionate Truth." Meanjin Quarterly 61.1 (2002): 24–34.
- King, Michael. An Inward Sun: The World of Janet Frame. Penguin (NZ), 2002.
- King, Michael. Tread Softly for you Tread on My Life. Cape Catley (NZ), 2001
- King, Michael (2000). Wrestling with the Angel: A Life of Janet Frame. New Zealand: Penguin.
- "Legendary NZ writer Janet Frame dies". New Zealand Herald. 29 January 2004.
- St. Pierre, Matthew Paul 2011. Janet Frame: Semiotics and Biosemiotics in Her Early Fiction. Lanham: Fairleigh Dickinson University Press.
