= Harvard Review of Psychiatry =

- Language: English
- Edited by: Joshua L. Roffman

Publication details
- History: 1993-present
- Publisher: Lippincott Williams & Wilkins (United States)
- Frequency: Bimonthly
- Impact factor: 3.264 (2017)

Standard abbreviations
- ISO 4: Harv. Rev. Psychiatry

Indexing
- ISSN: 1067-3229 (print); 1465-7309 (web)
- OCLC no.: 42904879

Links
- Journal homepage; Online access; Online archive

The Harvard Review of Psychiatry is a peer-reviewed medical journal covering all aspects of psychiatry. The editor-in-chief is Joshua L. Roffman. According to the Journal Citation Reports, the journal has a 2017 impact factor of 3.264.
