= Frank Sargeson =

New Zealand writer (1903–1982)

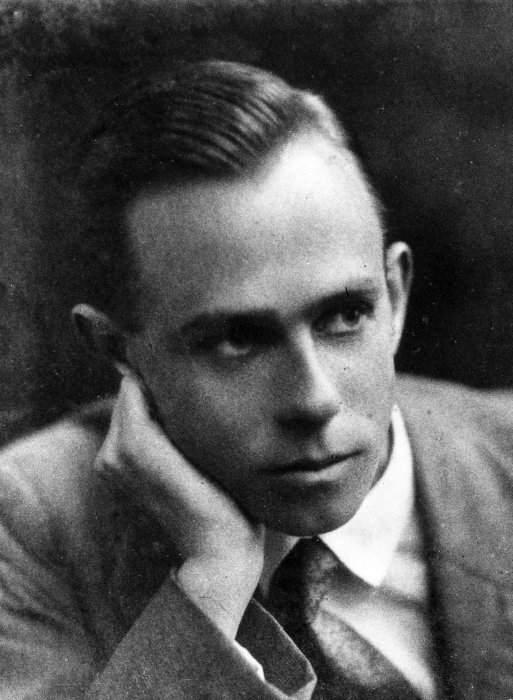
- Sargeson in 1927
- Born: Norris Frank Davey; 23 March 1903 Hamilton, New Zealand
- Died: 1 March 1982 (aged 78) Auckland, New Zealand
- Occupation: Writer
- Genre: Short stories

Frank Sargeson (/ˈsɑːrdʒəsən/) (born Norris Frank Davey; 23 March 1903 – 1 March 1982) was a New Zealand short story writer and novelist. Born in Hamilton, Sargeson had a middle-class and puritanical upbringing, and initially worked as a lawyer. After travelling to the United Kingdom for two years and working as a clerk on his return, he was convicted of indecent assault for a homosexual encounter and moved to live on his uncle's farm for a period. Having already written and published some short stories in the late 1920s, he began to focus on his writing and moved into his parents' holiday cottage where he would live for the rest of his life.

Sargeson became an influential figure in New Zealand writing, and his work continues to be recognised as a major influence on New Zealand literature. Sargeson is known for his minimalist and sparse style, with a focus on unhappy and isolated male characters, and has been credited with introducing everyday New Zealand English to literature. He published over forty short stories in the 1930s and 1940s, and later works included novels, plays and autobiographies. He also mentored and supported other young New Zealand writers, most notably Janet Frame.

== Early life and education ==
Sargeson was born in Hamilton, New Zealand on 23 March 1903, the second of four children. His name at birth was Norris Frank Davey but he would later adopt the surname of his mother, Rachel Sargeson. Although later in life Sargeson became known for his literary depiction of the laconic and unsophisticated New Zealand working-class men, his upbringing was comfortable and middle-class, if puritanical; his father, Edwin Davey, was the Hamilton town clerk and an active campaigner against social ills such as alcohol and gambling. Both his parents were active Methodists.

He attended Hamilton West School followed by Hamilton High School. From 1921 onwards he worked in solicitors' offices and studied law by distance through Auckland University College, as well as spending time at the farm of his mother's brother, Oakley Sargeson, in Ōkahukura, King Country. Although outwardly conforming with his parents' expectations, Sargeson was struggling inwardly with his sexuality and what he wanted to do with his life. In 1925, after an argument with his mother because she read his private correspondence, he moved to Auckland to continue his studies, and obtained his legal qualifications in 1926. He began writing short stories in the late 1920s.

Upon completing his training as a solicitor, Sargeson left New Zealand in February 1927 and spent two years in the United Kingdom, where he travelled, wrote about his experiences and had his first open homosexual relationship, with an interior decorator who was 14 years older than him. He returned to New Zealand in 1928 and was unable to find work either as a solicitor or as a journalist. He was eventually hired as a clerk by the Public Trust Office in Wellington, where he worked for 15 months.

== Conviction and reclusion ==
On 2 September 1929, Sargeson met a painter, Leonard Hollobon, and they had sex together. A month later, Sargeson was arrested. Hollobon had been blackmailed by another sex partner, gone to the police about it, and named Davey as someone he had had sex with. They were both found guilty of "indecent assault" (since consent was not legally possible for sex between men). Hollobon was sentenced to five years' imprisonment, Davey given a suspended sentence. (His biographer Michael King tells of police surveillance of Hollobon and immediate arrest of them both, and Sargeson betraying Hollobon, based on the account of a member of Sargeson's family, but this version is confirmed by Chris Brickell, based on Hollobon's trial record.) He was required to leave Wellington to live with his uncle in Ōkahukura, where he spent 18 months working on the farm and writing.

== Start of writing career ==
During this time he successfully published an article about his European travels in The New Zealand Herald in May 1930 and also completed his first novel, which was rejected by publishers.

In May 1931, Sargeson took permanent residence in his parents' holiday cottage (or bach) in Takapuna. He was to remain at the bach as a full-time writer for most of the rest of his life. The bach was primitive and was described by Sargeson as "nothing more than a small one-roomed hut in a quiet street ending in a no-man's land of mangrove mud-flats that belonged to the inner harbour. It was very decayed, with weather-boards falling off."

It was at this time that he began using the name Frank Sargeson, in part to hide his criminal conviction, in part as a rejection of his parents' middle-class values, and in part in tribute to his uncle Oakley Sargeson. Early on he registered for unemployment benefits in order to be able to spend as much time as possible writing; he said he wished to produce work "which would be marked by an individual flavour: there would be a certain quality which would be recognised as my own and nobody else's". He began to grow fruit and vegetables and to take in people who were struggling financially or on the social fringes of society, who he described as the "odds-and-ends kind of people I tend naturally to cherish and try to comfort".

He began to establish a reputation in the writing world from 1935 onwards, with short stories contributed to the left-wing magazine Tomorrow. This led to the publication of a collection, Conversation with My Uncle, and Other Sketches, in 1936. His short stories from this time demonstrate the features that would come to characterise his style: minimalist and austere narration and characters, and the use of everyday New Zealand spoken English, and showed the influence of the American writer Sherwood Anderson, whose stories Sargeson was reading at the time. In late 1939, Sargeson was diagnosed with surgical tuberculosis, which meant he was excused from conscription in World War II and eligible for an invalid's benefit.

== Literary success and post-war years ==
By 1940, more than forty of Sargeson's short stories had been published and he had established a significant reputation in New Zealand as a writer. That year, his story "The Making of a New Zealander" won first-equal prize in a competition held to mark New Zealand's centennial, and his second short story collection, A Man and His Wife, was published by Caxton Press. He was also receiving international attention, with his work appearing in journals in Australia, the UK and the USA, in John Lehmann's anthologies and periodicals such as Penguin New Writing. The Oxford Companion to New Zealand Literature (2006) said that Sargeson "dominated" New Zealand short fiction at this time, with his "wry sketches or ostensible yarns about apparently undistinguished characters and minor occurrences", in which "the characters are depicted as itinerant labourers or unemployed men, seldom happily married and frequently without any apparent family connection".

He also was increasingly becoming part of the New Zealand literary community through his friendships with other local writers (including A. R. D. Fairburn, Robin Hyde, Jane Mander, Denis Glover and others). In 1945, Sargeson edited an anthology of short stories by New Zealand writers, called Speaking for Ourselves, published both by Caxton Press in New Zealand and by Reed & Harris in Melbourne, Australia. It received favourable reviews but was not commercially successful.

In 1945, the local council informed Sargeson that the decrepit bach on his family's property had to be demolished. Sargeson had little money this time but managed to persuade his father to gift the property to him. It was as part of this legal transfer, in February 1946, that he formally changed his name by deed poll to Frank Sargeson. He no longer qualified for an invalid's benefit as his tuberculosis had been cured by antibiotics, but through the intervention of his friends, the government replaced his benefit with a "literary pension". With these funds, a new bach was built in 1948 by his friend George Haydn, who used the least expensive materials available that complied with the building code.

In 1949, Sargeson published his first full-length novel, I Saw in My Dream. The first part of the novel had already been published in Penguin New Writing and as a small book by Caxton Press and Reed & Harris. Reviews were unenthusiastic and mixed in both England and New Zealand. In 1953, two of his short stories were included in World's Classics: New Zealand short stories, edited by Dan Davin for Oxford University Press.

Sargeson continued to nurture and promote New Zealand literary talent, as he had with Speaking for Ourselves, most notably by inviting the young author and poet Janet Frame to live in the former army hut on his property in 1955, not long after her discharge from Seacliff Lunatic Asylum. She lived and worked in the army hut from April 1955 to July 1956, producing her first full-length novel Owls Do Cry (Pegasus, 1957), which is considered a masterpiece of New Zealand writing. Later, she wrote about this period in her autobiography, An Angel at my Table. He was also a friend and mentor to other young writers such as Maurice Duggan and John Reece Cole. Sargeson also extended his friendship to the young architect Renate Prince, who boarded with Sargeson in the former army hut prior to Frame's residence.

In 1953, to mark Sargeson's fiftieth birthday, Landfall published "A Letter to Frank Sargeson", written and signed by sixteen of his fellow New Zealand writers, including Frame, Duggan, David Ballantyne, Bill Pearson, Helen Lilian Shaw and others. The letter praised Sargeson for his contributions to New Zealand literature, saying that he had "proved that a New Zealander could publish work true to his own country and of a high degree of artistry, and that exile in the cultural centres of the old world was not necessary to this end", and "revealed that our manners and behaviour formed just as good a basis for enduring literature as those of any other country". In the editorial to that same issue, Charles Brasch commented that Sargeson's birthday was more than a merely personal occasion: "By his courage and his gifts he showed that it was possible to be a writer and contrive to live, somehow, in New Zealand, and all later writers are in his debt."

At this time it seemed that Sargeson's career might be over; his literary output during the 1950s had slowed, with only one novella, two short stories and a short essay, and two partially completed plays. In her autobiography, Frame recalled that in the mid-1950s Sargeson "was often depressed by the general neglect of writers and by the fact that his own books were out of print".

In 1953, Sargeson was awarded the Queen Elizabeth II Coronation Medal.

== Later career ==
In the 1960s, Sargeson's writing career experienced a renewal, and between 1964 and 1976 he published eleven further books. In 1964, the collection of Collected Stories, 1935–1963 was published. The two plays he had begun in the 1950s, the comedy The Cradle and the Egg and the drama A Time For Sowing, were both produced in Auckland in the early 1960s, and published under the title of Wrestling with the Angel (1964). Memoirs of a Peon, a novel he had completed in the late 1950s but struggled to get published, was finally published in 1965 by a London publisher, and in that same year he won the Bank of New Zealand Katherine Mansfield Memorial Award for the short story "Just Trespassing, Thanks". Two further novels followed: The Hangover (1967) and The Joy of the Worm (1969). Unlike his earlier writing, the characters of these three later novels are generally middle-class, and the writing is more fluent and less minimalist, but he retains the themes of isolation and puritanism.

In the 1970s, after the death of his long-time partner Harry Doyle, Sargeson completed a trilogy of autobiographies: Once is Enough (1973), More than Enough (1975) and Never Enough (1977). In 1974 Sargeson received a Scholarship in Letters from the New Zealand Literary Fund and an honorary doctorate of literature from the University of Auckland. In 1981 his autobiographies were published as a single volume, Sargeson. He continued to write and publish short fiction until 1980, when his health began to decline.

== Death and legacy ==
Sargeson died at North Shore Hospital in Auckland in 1982. A book of his critical writing, Conversation in a Train, was published posthumously in 1983.

Sargeson left his estate to his friend Christine Cole Catley who later launched the Frank Sargeson Trust. After his death, the Trust restored his bach and opened it to the public. In 1990, Sargeson's ashes were scattered on the property, and a sign was put up outside the bach stating: "Here a truly New Zealand literature had its beginnings". It is now known as the Frank Sargeson House.

In 1987, the Trust established the Sargeson Fellowship, a New Zealand literary award, to provide assistance to New Zealand writers. Some writers who have received the award include Janet Frame (who was, appropriately, the first writer to receive the award in 1987), Alan Duff and Michael King. From 1987 to 1996 the award was paid for by the Trust, but after funding ran out, law firm Buddle Findlay took over sponsorship from 1997 to 2013 and the fellowship was renamed the Buddle Findlay Sargeson Fellowship. Since 2013, the fellowship has been sponsored by law firm Grimshaw & Co and it is now known as the Grimshaw Sargeson Fellowship.

Since 2003 (the centenary of Sargeson's birth), the Frank Sargeson Memorial Lecture has been delivered every year at the University of Waikato by a notable New Zealand writer, and since 2019 the University has sponsored a short story prize, the Sargeson Prize, in his honour.

In 2024, the Alexander Turnbull Library's Frank Sargeson Collection, comprising Sargeson's draft manuscripts, personal papers and photographs, was inscribed in UNESCO Memory of the World Aotearoa New Zealand Ngā Mahara o te Ao register.

== Works ==
=== Collections ===
- Conversation with my Uncle and Other Sketches (1936)
- A Man and his Wife (1940)
- That Summer: And Other Stories (1946)
- Collected Stories, 1935–1963 with an introduction by Bill Pearson (1964); with an introduction by E. M. Forster (1965)
- The Stories of Frank Sargeson (1973)

=== Short stories ===
- "Conversation with my Uncle" (1936)
- "Cats by the Tail"
- "Chaucerian"
- "The Last War"
- "In the Midst of Life"
- "White Man's Burden"
- "Good Samaritan"
- "A Good Boy"
- "I've Lost my Pal"
- "They Gave her a Rise"
- "A Pair of Socks"
- "An Affair of the Heart"
- "Cow-pats"
- "In the Department"
- "Three Men"
- "An Attempt at an Explanation"
- "A Great Day"
- "Last Adventure"
- "Miss Briggs"
- "Toothache"
- "Tod"
- "Boy"
- "A Hen and some Eggs"
- "Sale Day"
- "The Making of a New Zealander"
- "An Englishwoman Abroad"
- "A Man and his Wife" (1940)
- "Old Man's Story"
- "Big Ben"
- "Park Seat"
- "Two Worlds"
- "A Man of Good Will"
- "That Summer"
- "Gods Live in Woods"
- "Letter to a Friend"
- "Showers"
- "The Hole that Jack Dug"
- "The Undertaker's Story"
- "The Colonel's Daughter"
- "A Personal Memory"

=== Novels and novellas ===
- I Saw in my Dream (1949)
- I for One (1952)
- Memoirs of a peon (1965)
- The Hangover (1967)
- Joy of the Worm (1969)
- Sunset Village (1976)
- En Route published with a novella by Edith Campion in a joint volume entitled Tandem (1979)

=== Autobiographies ===
- Once is Enough: A Memoir (1973)
- More than Enough: A Memoir (1975)
- Never Enough: Places and People Mainly (1977)
