= Center for Deployment Psychology =

The Center for Deployment Psychology (CDP) is an organization offering training for behavioral health professionals who provide mental health services unique to the experience of deployment in the United States Armed Forces for active-duty military service members, veterans and their families. CDP is headquartered at the Uniformed Services University of the Health Sciences (USUHS) in Bethesda, Maryland, and is funded by the United States Department of Defense.

== Overview ==
Both military and non-military mental health providers are served, and CDP has placed deployment behavioral health psychologists at 11 military medical centers across the United States. Each medical center has an established American Psychological Association accredited psychology internship program. In addition, CDP offers workshops for college and university mental health professionals to help campus personnel understand and treat the specific mental health needs of the military and veteran student.

== Training ==
Training is offered in the following areas: the deployment experience, trauma, mental health care of the seriously wounded, and the impact of deployment on families. The Center provides workshops on treating post-traumatic stress disorder (PTSD), traumatic brain injury, insomnia, chronic pain, depression, suicide, and substance abuse. For non-military behavioral health professionals, CDP conducts workshops on military culture.

The training emphasizes empirically supported treatments known as evidence based psychotherapies. Training includes workshops in Prolonged Exposure Therapy for PTSD, cognitive processing therapy for PTSD, and cognitive behavioral therapy for insomnia. Under the leadership of Executive Director David Riggs, the Center for Deployment Psychology has trained more than 20,000 behavioral health professionals since its formation in 2006.

== See also ==
- New Zealand Association of Psychotherapists
