= Christine Cole Catley =

New Zealand journalist, writer and publisher

Dame Christine Cole Catley DNZM QSM
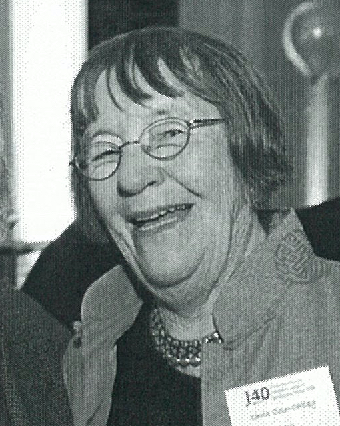
- Cole Catley in 2006
- Born: Christine McKelvie Bull; 19 December 1922; Wellington, New Zealand
- Died: 21 August 2011 (aged 88); Auckland, New Zealand
- Education: Canterbury University College
- Spouse(s): John Reece Cole; Douglas Catley

Dame Christine McKelvie Cole Catley DNZM QSM (née Bull; 19 December 1922 – 21 August 2011) was a New Zealand journalist, publisher and author. She co-founded the Parents Centre movement and influenced broadcasting policy in New Zealand.

== Career ==
Christine McKelvie Bull was born in 1922 in Wellington, New Zealand. She grew up on a farm in Hunterville, Rangitikei and began writing while still at school, freelancing for the Taranaki Daily News. She won a scholarship to the University of Canterbury and moved to Christchurch, where she also worked as a part-time reporter for The Press newspaper while studying. In addition, she acted in Ngaio Marsh plays and wrote for the university magazine, Canta.

After completing her Bachelor of Arts degree in English, she began a Master's program. She became pregnant and chose to keep the baby in spite of stigma against unwed mothers, giving birth to daughter Sarah in 1945. While in Christchurch, she met and became friends with the artist Rita Angus, who painted her and her first child in a portrait entitled Mother and Child in 1945.

In 1946, Cole Catley and Sarah moved to Wellington, and she began writing for the Labour Party's daily paper, The Southern Cross, the New Zealand Listener, and Radio New Zealand. In 1948 she married John Reece Cole, a protégé of writer Frank Sargeson, and they subsequently had two children, Nicola in 1950 and Martin in 1953. They hosted writers such as James K. Baxter and Louis Johnson (poet) in their home. In 1956, the family spent two years in Indonesia where John was posted as a UNESCO library advisor to the Indonesian government and Cole Catley was appointed by Australia's ABC Network to establish an office there.

When television came to New Zealand, Cole Catley was the country's first TV reviewer, writing for The Dominion (using the pseudonym "Sam Cree") and for the Sunday Times (under the name "Hillary Court"). She was a member of the Broadcasting Council, but was removed by then Prime Minister Robert Muldoon due to disagreements between them. In 1967, she became tutor-in-charge of New Zealand's first polytechnic school of journalism. In this role, she insisted that half of the students accepted into the school must be female, a move which was considered to greatly accelerate the movement of women into the industry.

Cole Catley's first job in publishing was as an editor for A.H. and A.W. Reed, in Wellington. In 1973, she and her second husband, Doug Catley, set up their own publishing house, Cape Catley Press. The imprint specialised in New Zealand works and authors, and published over 100 titles, including notable writers such as Michael King and Archibald Baxter. Cole Catley also ran writing workshops, which led to a number of writers being published by her publishing company. In 2003, Cole Catley published her own book on the life of New Zealand astronomer Beatrice Tinsley, Bright Star.

She died on 21 August 2011 from lung cancer at age 88.

=== Other interests ===
In 1952, Cole Catley and Helen Brew founded Parents Centres New Zealand, an organisation committed to providing education and support for pregnant women and their husbands. The organisation also lobbied authorities to change hospital procedures around childbirth and delivery, such as enabling fathers to be present during labour. Cole Catley promoted the cause through public talks, newspaper articles, and the informational Bulletin of the Parents' Centre, and was national president of the organisation in 1962-1963.

In 1982, Cole Catley's long-time friend, writer Frank Sargeson died and left his estate to her as beneficiary and literary executor. He suggested that she sell his bach and spend the money on a cruise. Instead, she established the Frank Sargeson Trust and the Sargeson Fellowship, and ensured his cottage was retained as a memorial. She was so successful in this endeavour that she was later also involved with establishing the Michael King Writers Centre.

== Honours and awards ==
In the 1994 New Year Honours, Cole Catley was awarded the Queen's Service Medal for public services. In the 2006 Queen's Birthday Honours, she was appointed a Distinguished Companion of the New Zealand Order of Merit, for services to literature. In 2009, following the reinstatement of titular honours by the New Zealand government, Catley accepted redesignation as a Dame Companion of the New Zealand Order of Merit.

In 2010, Catley received a Copyright Licensing Writers' Award to write her autobiography, which she was working on at the time of her death.
