= Owls Do Cry =

New Zealand modernist novel

- Author: Janet Frame
- Language: English
- Published: 1957
- Publisher: Pegasus Press
- Publication place: New Zealand
- ISBN: 9781869418892
- OCLC: 960181712
- Dewey Decimal: 823

Owls Do Cry is a modernist novel by New Zealand author Janet Frame. Published in 1957, the book covers the story of the Withers siblings, who live in a seaside town in the South Island through a period of 20 years. The book extensively covers Daphne Withers' journey, including undergoing lobotomy. Owls Do Cry is the first novel written by Frame and its content is loosely based on Frame's life, particularly her experience of spending eight years in and out of mental asylums, greatly influenced the content of the novel.
