= James McNeish =

New Zealand writer

Sir James McNeish KNZM
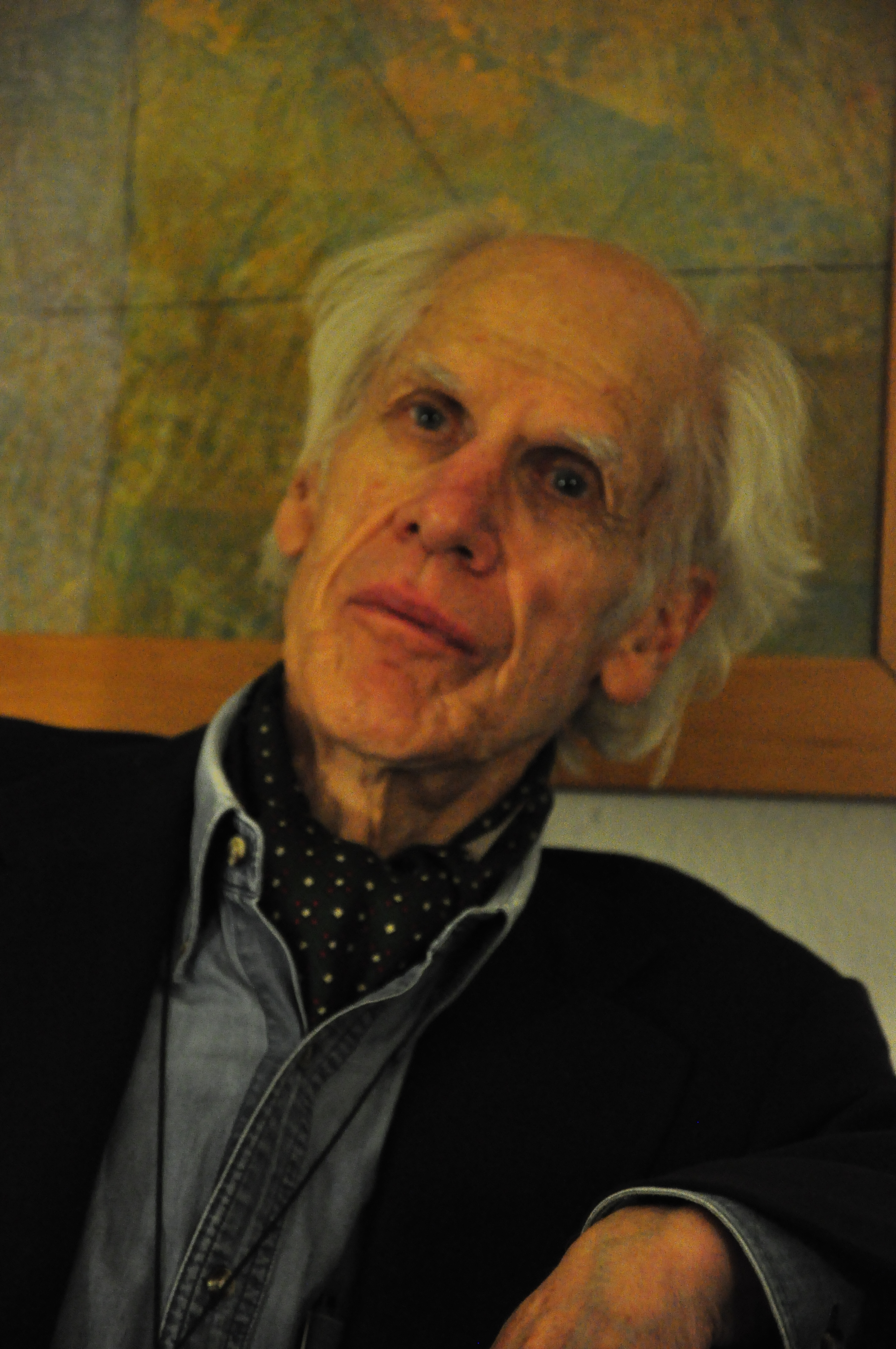
- Born: James Henry Peter McNeish; 23 October 1931; Auckland, New Zealand
- Died: 11 November 2016 (aged 85); Wellington, New Zealand
- Education: Auckland Grammar School
- Alma mater: Auckland University College
- Occupations: Novelist, biographer and playwright
- Spouse(s): Felicity Ann Wily (m. 1960; div. 1964) Helen Schnitzer (m. 1968)
- Children: two
- Writing career
- Language: English

Sir James Henry Peter McNeish KNZM (23 October 1931 – 11 November 2016) was a New Zealand novelist, playwright and biographer.

== Biography ==
McNeish attended Auckland Grammar School and graduated from Auckland University College with a degree in languages. He travelled the world as a young man, working as a deckhand on a Norwegian freighter in 1958, and recording folk music in 21 countries. He worked in the Theatre Workshop in London with Joan Littlewood, and was influenced by her spirit of socially-committed drama. He worked as a freelance programme and documentary maker for the BBC Radio's Features Department in the 1960s. He also wrote for The Guardian and The Observer. He spent three years in Sicily with Danilo Dolci, the non-violent anti-Mafia reformer, and wrote Fire under the Ashes (1965, London: Hodder and Stoughton) a biographical account of Dolci's life which is remarkable for its objectivity and clarity. He wrote some 25 books.

McNeish's writing has been the subject of critical acclaim both at home and abroad. Besides New Zealand, his books are set in Sicily, London, Israel and New Caledonia. He was described as "prolific" by the Oxford Companion to New Zealand Literature. His book Lovelock was nominated for the 1986 Booker Prize.

In 1999, McNeish was awarded the prestigious National Library of New Zealand Research Fellowship, allowing him to research the lives and friendships of five prominent New Zealanders who attended Oxford University in the 1930s—four of them Rhodes Scholars: James Bertram, Geoffrey Cox, Dan Davin, Ian Milner and John Mulgan. This multi-biography was published under the title The Dance of the Peacocks: New Zealanders in exile in the time of Hitler and Mao Tse Tung (2003). In the same vein, The Sixth Man (2007) is a biography of another gifted New Zealander, Paddy Costello, who studied at Cambridge University during the same period and whose subsequent career in the Foreign Office was marred by controversy.

In 2010, McNeish was honoured with the Prime Minister's Award for Literary Achievement in Non-Fiction. His intention was to donate part of his prize towards a travel scholarship—'a hardship scheme'—for young writers.

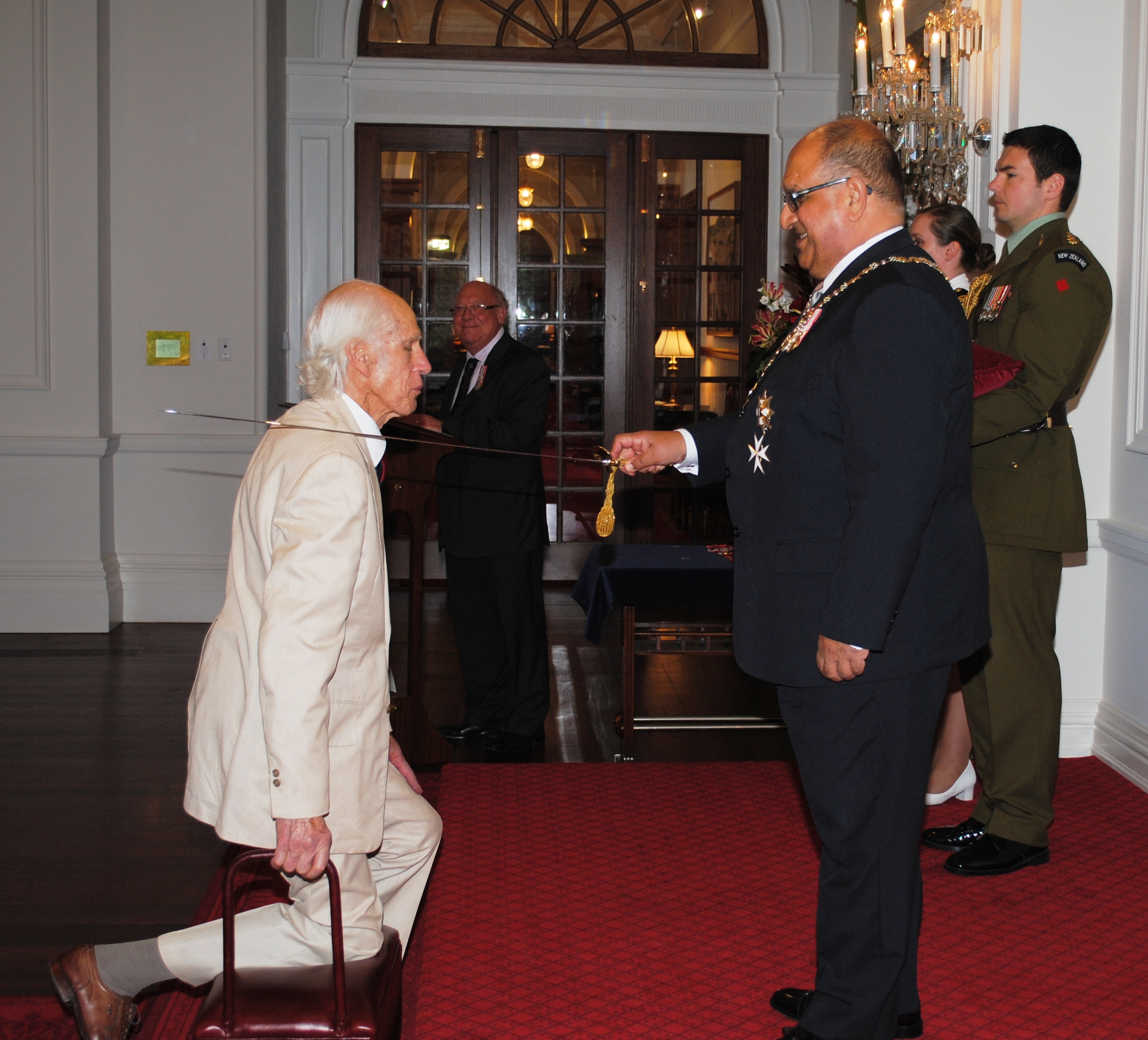
McNeish's investiture as a Knight Companion of the New Zealand Order of Merit by the governor-general, Sir Anand Satyanand, at Government House, Wellington, on 14 April 2011

It was said about McNeish that among New Zealand novelists, he was the 'wild card'. In an interview with Philip Matthews in 2010 (Weekend, 26 June 2010), he said: "I've always been an outsider, and I'm quite comfortable with that. To retain your critical sense in a small society like New Zealand, you have to stand apart".

In the 2011 New Year Honours, McNeish was appointed as Knight Companion of the New Zealand Order of Merit for services to literature.

McNeish lived in Wellington, New Zealand, with his wife Helen, Lady McNeish. He has one son Mark and one daughter, Kathryn. He died on 11 November 2016, aged 85, several days after submitting his final manuscript, Breaking Ranks, to HarperCollins for publication in April 2017. His wife, Helen, Lady McNeish, died in 2025.

== Honours and awards ==
- Recipient of the Katherine Mansfield Menton Fellowship, France, 1973
- Writer in Residence, Berlin Kuenstler Program, 1983
- National Library of New Zealand Research Fellow, 1999
- Berlin Writers' Residency 2009 funded by Creative New Zealand, the national agency for the development of the arts in New Zealand.
- Recipient of the 2010 Prime Minister's Award for Literary Achievement in non-fiction.
- Knight Companion of the New Zealand Order of Merit, 31 December 2010 New Year Honours.
- President of Honour of the New Zealand Society of Authors, 2012–2013

== Major works ==
Novels

- Mackenzie (1970)
- The Mackenzie Affair (1972)
- The Glass Zoo (1976)
- Joy (1982)
- Lovelock (1986; enlarged edition, 2009)
- Penelope's Island (1990)
- My Name Is Paradiso (1995)
- Mr Halliday & the Circus Master (1996)
- The Crime of Huey Dunstan (2010)

Non-Fiction

- Tavern in the Town (1957; revised and enlarged, 1984)
- Fire Under the Ashes: A Life of Danilo Dolci (1965)
- Larks in a Paradise (with Marti Friedlander) (1974)
- As for the Godwits (1977)
- Art of the Pacific (with Brian Brake) (1980)
- Belonging: Conversations in Israel (1980)
- Walking on my Feet: A Life of A.R.D. Fairburn (with Helen McNeish) (1983)
- Ahnungslos in Berlin: A Berlin Diary (1985)
- The Man from Nowhere & Other Prose (1991)
- The Mask of Sanity: The Bain Murders (1997)
- An Albatross Too Many (1998)
- Dance of the Peacocks: New Zealanders in exile in the time of Hitler and Mao Tse-tung (Vintage Books, 2003), ISBN 1-86941-564-7
- The Sixth Man: the extraordinary life of Paddy Costello (2007)
- Touchstones – Memories of people and place (2012)
- Seelenbinder: the Olympian who defied Hitler (2016)
- ' 'Breaking Ranks-three great stories about conscience and consequence.' ' (2017) Harper Collins.

Plays

- The Mouse Man (1975)
- Eighteen Ninety-Five (1975)
- The Rocking Cave (1973)
- Thursday Bloody Thursday (1998)

== Articles, reviews and essays ==
Anthology

- Not so far from Godwit Bay, In From a Room of their Own, A Celebration of the Katherine Mansfield Fellowship, Auckland, Whitcoulls, (1993)

Articles

- A visit to Denis Glover, Quote Unquote (30 Dec 1995) 17–19
- Ambush aftermath in New Caledonia, The Press (1991) 18
- Did Ulysses just sail round Sicily? The Dominion (1991) 8
- Mulgan's War, The Listener (April 1994) 38
- Paper exodus sends our literary heritage abroad, The Dominion Sunday Times (1990) 9–20
- Paper exodus sends our literary heritage abroad, Archifacts (April 1991) 77–91
- Patric's Day (Obit of Patric Carey) The Listener (September 2006)

Biography

- Walking on my feet: A. R. D. Fairburn : a kind of biography. Auckland, Collins 1983, New Outlook Dec 1983/Jan 1984 Dec/Jan (1983) 37

Interview

- The Greek Experience: a conversation with David Kennedy, Art New Zealand 36 (1985) 50–53

Letter

- Murder in Bainville: an open letter to Graeme Lay, Quote Unquote 25 July (1995) 16–17

Non-Fiction

- A war of nerves, The Listener 118.2486 (1987) 16–19
- Breaking the silence, The Listener 146.2850 (1994) 20–25
- Case closed : how and why David Bain killed his family, The Listener (1997) 18
- Lovelock's dream mile, The Listener 145.2839 (1994) 24–25

Tavern in the Town. Wellington: Reed, 1957

- The Ends of Empire : Part 1, The Listener 115.2448 (1987) 11–15
- The Ends of Empire : Part 2, The Listener 115.2449 (1987) 10–13
- The Grand Old Hotels of Thermal-land, Meanjin Quarterly 47 May (1985) 144–148

The Man From Nowhere & Other Prose. Auckland: Godwit, 1991

North and South Dec (1991) 119–123 Walking on My Feet : A. R. D. Fairburn, 1904–1957 : a Kind of Biography. Auckland: Collins, 1983

- Who will guard the peace? The Listener ang2057 124.2571 (1989) 12–15
- Landfall 37 June (1983) 218–220
- New Outlook Autumn (1983) 35

Lovelock' Auckland, Godwit, 1994

- New Zealand Runner 49 April (1987) 16

Mackenzie: a Novel Auckland: Godwit, 1995

- Affairs 91 Mar (1971). Quote Unquote 22 April (1995) 30–31

Mr Halliday and the Circus Master. Auckland: David Ling Publishing, 1996

- Quote Unquote 41 Nov (1996) 30
- North and South 128 Nov (1996) 140–142
- New Zealand Books 7.1 Mar (1997) 10–11

My Name is Paradiso, Auckland: David Ling Publishing, 1995.

- Quote Unquote 24 June (1995) 26
- Metro 169 July (1995) 117–119
- Landfall 190 Spring (1995) 360–362
- New Zealand Books 5.5 Dec (1995) 9-11

Penelope's Island, Auckland: Hodder and Stoughton, 1990

- Metro 113 Nov (1990) 180–182
- New & Notable 7.5 Nov (1990) 5

The Glass Zoo, London, Hodder and Stoughton, 1976

- Best Sellers 36 Sept (1976) 184-184
- Landfall 30 Sept (1976) 208–211
- Islands 5.1 Sept (1976) 100–102

The Mackenzie Affair, Auckland: Hodder and Stoughton, 1972

Profile

- Last of the fighting brigadiers, New Zealand Herald (1993) 2-2
- Last of the fighting brigadiers, The Press(1993) 12
- Last of the fighting brigadiers, The Dominion (1993) 11
- The man between the rivers, Otago Daily Times (1993) 21
- New Zealand Geographic 8 Oct/Dec (1990) 18–41
- The man who made social medicine work (George McCall Smith, 1883–1958) The Listener April (1976) 20–21
- Review The Listener 1565 Oct (1969) 20
- The Dominion Oct (1993) 16
- Quote Unquote 38 Aug (1996) 30

== Sources ==
Articles

- Leek, Robert H., Home-grown vintage 73, Islands 2 Spring (1973) 315–318
- Four writers awarded scholarships, The Dominion (1989) 13
- Leigh, Jack, Circular journeys, The New Zealand Herald (1995) 6
- Mannion, Robert, A view to a killing, The Dominion (1997) 7
- Pennell, Graeme, Two faces of the same tragedy, Otago Daily Times (1997) 23
- Pennell, Graeme, Who pulled the trigger? David or Robin Bain? The New Zealand Herald (1997) 19
- Pennell, Graeme, Writers put Bain cases: murderer or victim? s18 The New Zealand Herald (1997) 17

Interviews

- Haley, Russell, Underdogs and overdogs, New Outlook Autumn (1983) 18–20
- King, John, A Sicilian adventure, The Evening Post(1995) 9–10
- Samson, Alan, Cold, Mafia inspire new book, (1995) 9
- Nichol, Ruth, Skinning a pumpkin, Quote Unquote 24 June (1995) 27
- Kitchin, Peter, Madness, murder in family of misfits, The Evening Post (1997) 5
- Van Beynen, Martin, The Bain murders : a psychological mystery? (1997) 3
- Saker, Nicola, At the writers desk: James McNeish, Wellington City Magazine Summer (1986) 56
- McNeish – just a man who writes books, The Dominion (1989) 13
- Sharp, Iain, Ironies with wry detachment, New Zealand Books 5.5 Dec (1995) 9-11
- Bartel, Susan, National Library Fellow 1999: James McNeish, Off the Record 6 (1999) 4

Reviews

- Penguin, NZ Weekly News 5311 (1965) 41
- McEldowney, Dennis, The Listener 65.1626 (1970) 16
- Jones, Lloyd, Landfall 25 March (1971) 93–103
- Simpson, Tony, Affairs 91 March (1971)
- Cleveland, L., The Listener 71.1726 (1972) 56
- McEldowney, Dennis, Islands 2 Autumn (1973) 106–108
- Rea, Ken, Act 20 Aug (1973) 56–58
- King, Michael, NZ Bookworld 14 Feb/Mar (1975) 27
- Oppenheim, R., New Argot 3.1 Mar (1975) 4
- Fry, A., The Listener 79.1860 (1975) 50–51
- Bertram, James, The Listener 81.1898 (1976) 36–37
- Rhodes, H. Winston, Landfall 30 Sept (1976) 208–211
- Cunningham, Kevin, NZ Bookworld 25 June (1976) 19
- Observer (1976) 30
- New Statesman 91 (1976) 108
- TLS (The Times Literary Supplement) (1976) 76
- Kirkus Reviews 44 (1976) 343
- The Listener London 95 (1976) 108
- Christian Science Monitor 68 (1976) 27
- Best Sellers 36 Sept (1976) 184
- Library Journal 101 (1976)1798
- McEldowney, Dennis, Islands 5.1 Sept (1976) 100–102
- Sanderson, M., The Listener 87.1974 (1977) 76–77
- Owen, A., NZ Bookworld 45 Feb (1978) 21–22
- Lambrecht, Winifred, Library Journal 105 (1980) 1072
- Glatt, Carol R., Library Journal 105 (1980) 871
- Publishers Weekly 217 (1980) 101
- Kirkus Reviews 48 (1980) 192
- Publishers Weekly 217 (1980) 74
- Booklist 76 (1980) 1251
- Guardian Weekly 123 (1980) 21
- Stringer, Terry, Art New Auckland 15 (1980) 57
- Edmond, Lauris, New Outlook Dec (1983) 37
- Edmond, Lauris, New Outlook Dec 1983/Jan 1984 Dec/Jan (1983) 37
- Evans, P. Lipsync 103.2256 (1983) 98
- Gifkins, Michael, New Outlook Autumn (1983) 35
- Alpers, Antony, The Listener 2289.105 Dec (1983) 86
- Alpers, Antony, The Listener 105.2289 (1983) 86
- Theobald, G., PSA Journal 70.2 Mar (1983) 14
- Owens, J., Landfall 37 June (1983) 218–220
- NZ Wineglass 44 Dec (1984) 9
- Butterworth, S., The Listener 109.2343 (1985) 26
- King, Michael, Metro 6.66 Dec (1986) 269–273
- Robinson, Roger, The Listener 116.2465 (1987) 56
- Mowbray, Trevor, School Library Review 7.3 (1987) 16–26
- Fordyce, Stephen, New Zealand Runner 49 April (1987) 16
- Steinberg, Sybil, Publishers Weekly 233.20 (1988) 67
- Moffitt, D. New & Notable 7.5 Nov (1990) 5
- Crosbie, Sharon, The Dominion Sunday Times (1990) 13
- Brooke, Agnes Mary, The Press (1990) 27
- King, Michael, Metro 113 Nov (1990) 180–182
- Eggleton, David, The Evening Post (1990) 5
- Eggleton, David, Otago Daily Times (1990) 21
- Ireland, Kevin, The Dominion (1990) 7
- Lay, Graeme, The Listener 128.2641 (1990) 110–111
- Lay, Graeme, North and South Dec (1991) 119–123
- Burton, David, The Evening Post (1991) 5
- Palenski, Ron, The Dominion (1991) 9
- Swain, Pauline, The Dominion Sunday Times (1991) 22
- Wattie, Nelson, Landfall 45.3 Sept (1991) 368–370
- Griffiths, George, The Otago Daily Times (1992) 26
- Hill, David, The Listener (1995) 50
- Cooper, Ronda, Metro 169 July (1995) 117–119
- Lay, Graeme, North and South 110 May (1995) 128–132
- Smither, Elizabeth Quote Unquote 24 June (1995) 26
- Kroetsch, Laura. The Dominion (1995) 20
- King, John, The Evening Post (1995) 7
- Savage, Paul, The Press (1995) 11
- Broatch, Mark, Quote Unquote 22 April (1995) 30–31
- Jensen, Kai, Landfall 190 Spring (1995) 360–362
- James, Bryan, The Otago Daily Times (1995) 28
- Sharp, Iain, New Zealand Books 5.5 Dec (1995) 9-11
- The New Zealand Herald (1995) 6
- Cross, Ian, The Listener (1996) 47
- Simpson, Tony, The Dominion (1996) 20
- Scott, Bede, The Sunday Star Times (1996) 4
- McLauchlan, Gordon, The New Zealand Herald (1996) 8
- McLean, Gavin, The Otago Daily Times (1996) 22
- Stratford, Stephen, Quote Unquote 41 Nov (1996) 30
- Burnard, Trevor. The Press (1996) 16
- Eggleton, David, The Evening Post (1996) 7
- Lay, Graeme, North and South 128 Nov (1996) 140–142
- Cooper, Ronda, Metro 184 Oct (1996) 117–120
- Lay, Graeme, North and South 137 Aug (1997) 132–134
- Warner, Howard, New Zealand Books 7.1 Mar (1997) 10–11
- Van Beynen, Martin, The Press (1997) 16
- Kitchin, Peter, The Evening Post (1997) 7
- Richards, Ian, The Listener (1998) 45
- Prebble, Ray, The Evening Post (1998) 5
- Hill, David, The Dominion (1998) 20
- Ireland, Kevin, The New Zealand Herald (1998) 6
- Sandra K. Bogart NZHerald.co.nz (2007) 16 July
- Eugene Bingham NZHerald.co.nz (2007) 8 September
- Hill, David, NZHerald.co.nz (2010) 20 July
