= 1925 New Year Honours (New Zealand) =

Annual awards for New Zealanders

The 1925 New Year Honours in New Zealand were appointments by King George V on the advice of the New Zealand government to various orders and honours to reward and highlight good works by New Zealanders. The awards celebrated the passing of 1924 and the beginning of 1925, and were announced on 1 January 1925.

The recipients of honours are displayed here as they were styled before their new honour.

== Earl ==
- Admiral of the Fleet John Rushworth, Viscount Jellicoe, GCB OM GCVO – late governor-general of New Zealand.
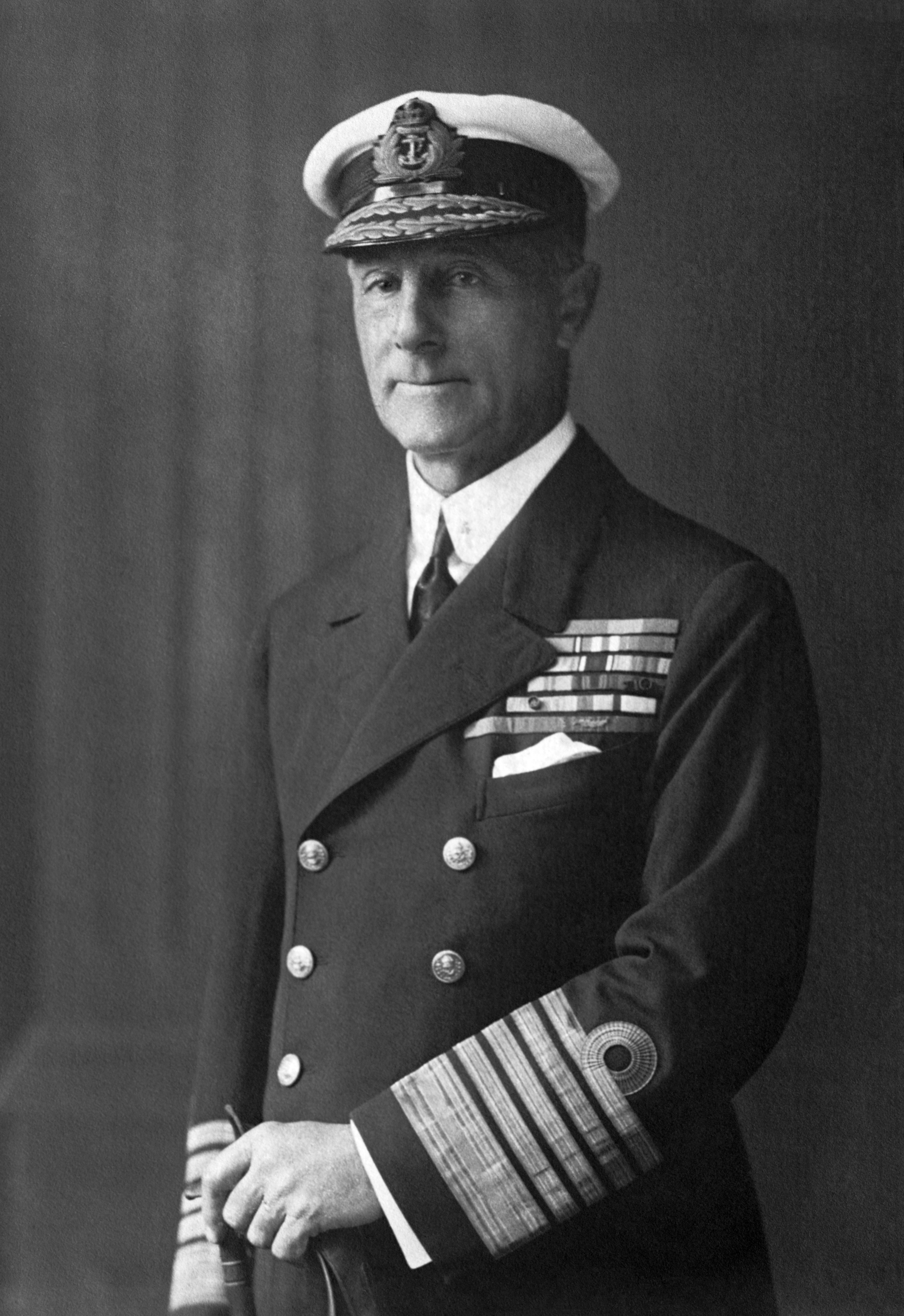
The Earl Jellicoe

== Knight Bachelor ==
- Frederick Truby King CMG MB –director of the Child Welfare Division of the Department of Health.
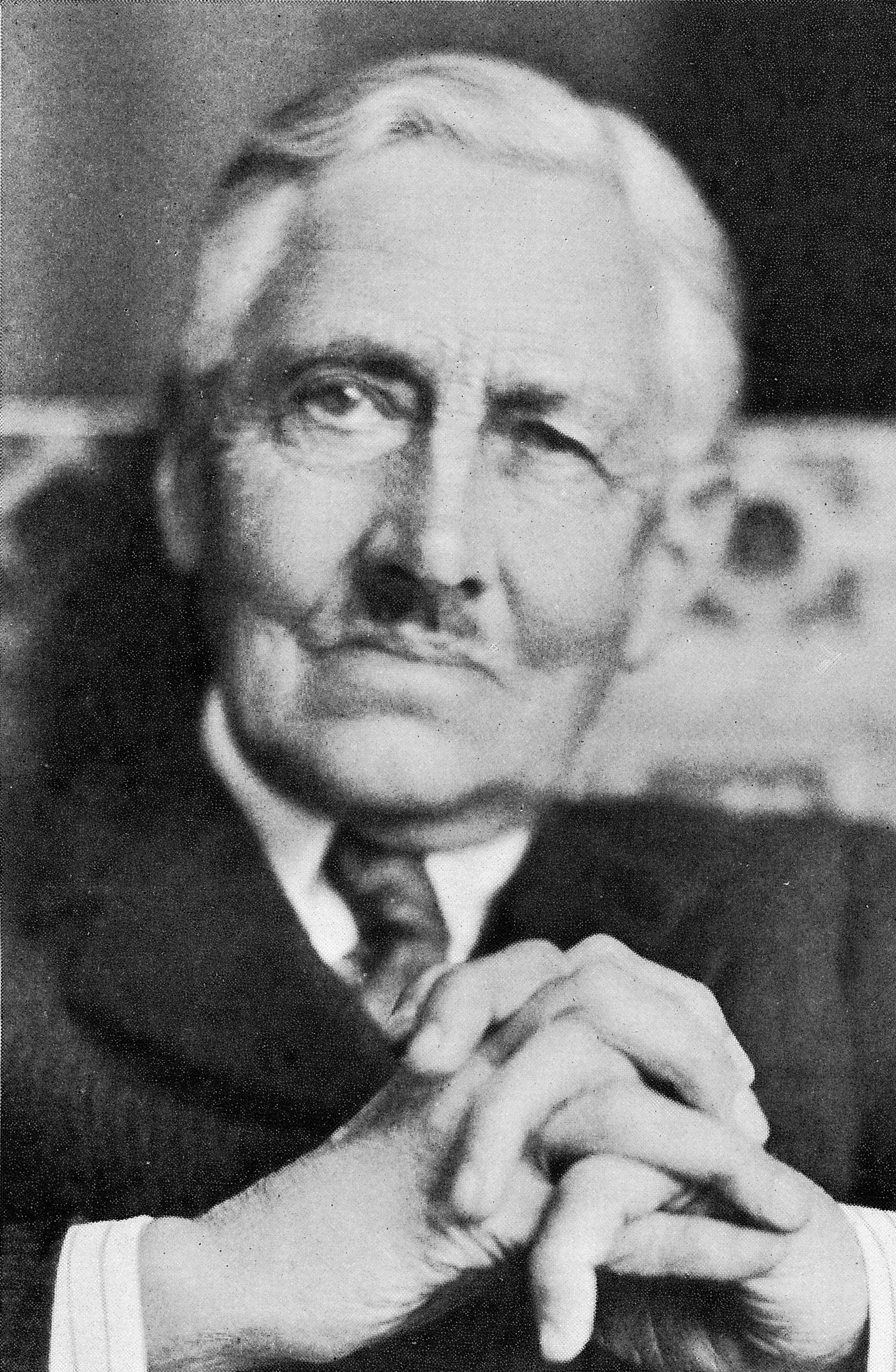
Sir Truby King

== Order of Saint Michael and Saint George ==
=== Knight Commander (KCMG) ===
- The Honourable Christopher James Parr CMG – Minister of Education, Minister of Justice and Minister in Charge of Police and Prisons Departments.
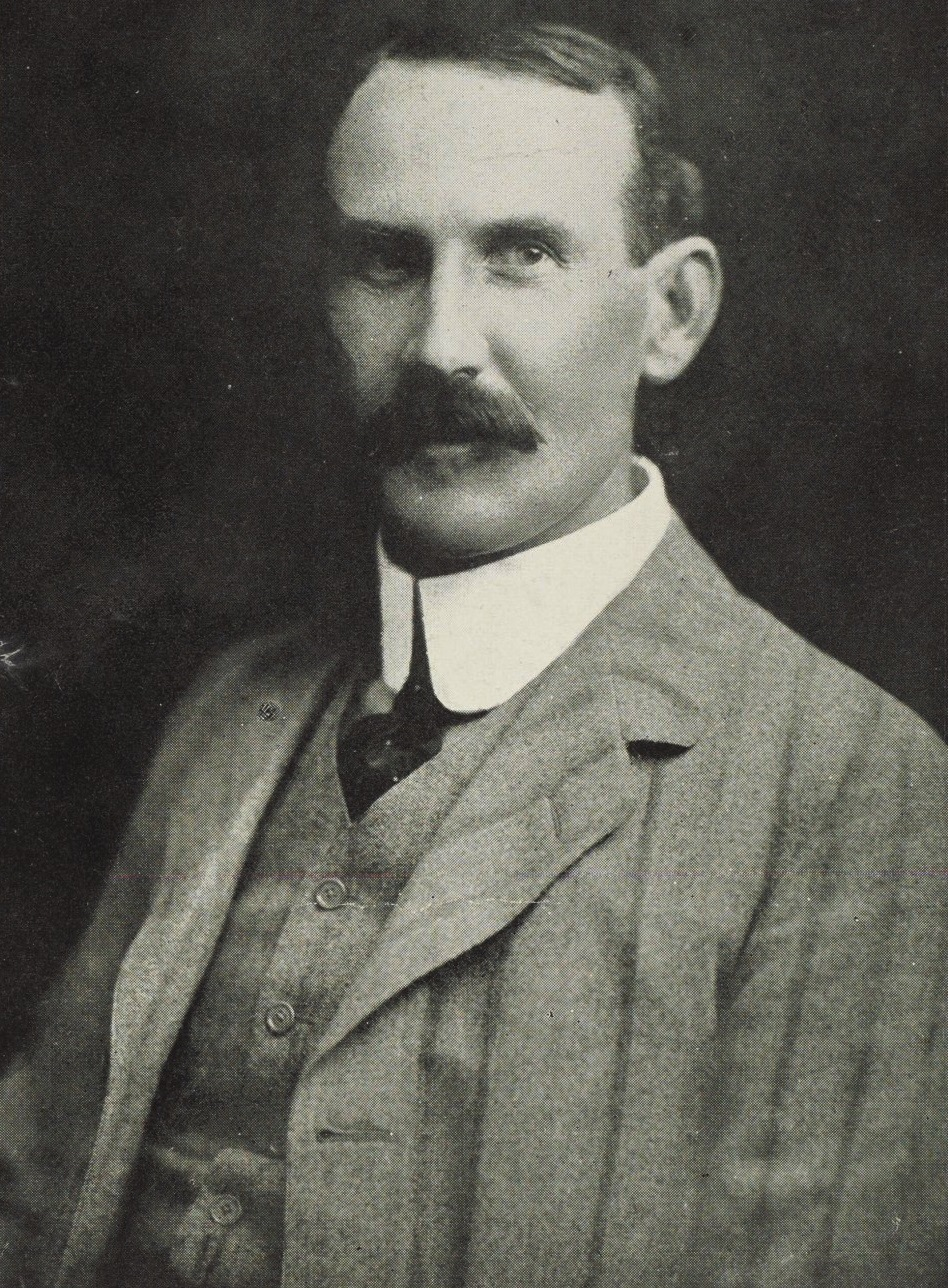
Sir James Parr

=== Companion (CMG) ===
- Captain Arthur Randolph Wormeley Curtis MC. In recognition of his services as private secretary to the governor-general.
- Frank Milner – of Oamaru; rector of Waitaki Boys' High School. In recognition of his services to education.
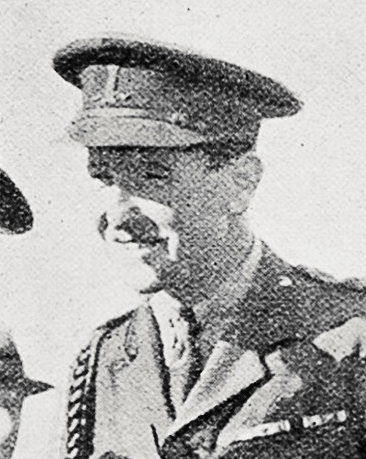
Arthur Curtis

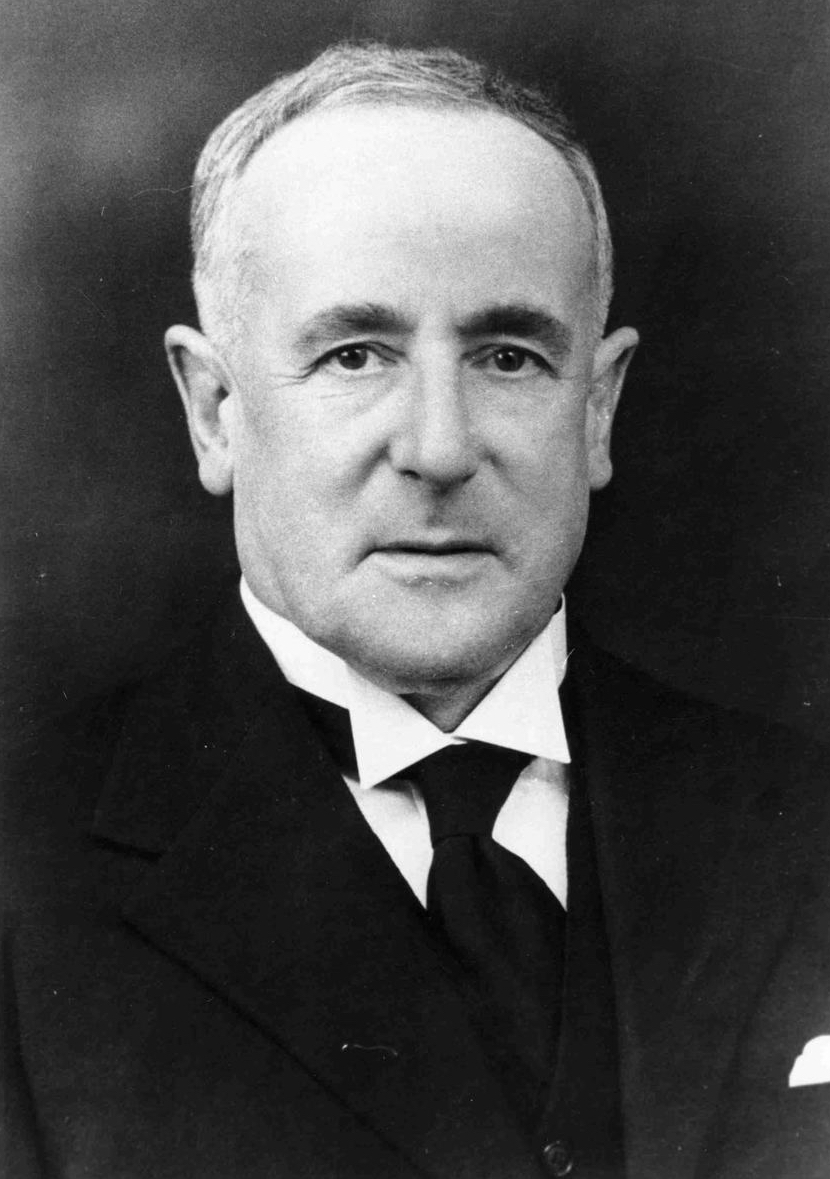
Frank Milner
