= Jim Burrows (army officer) =

New Zealand soldier and sportsman

Jim Burrows CBE DSO* ED
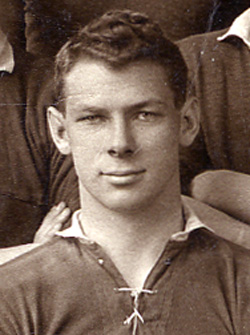
- Burrows in 1925

4th Rector of Waitaki Boys' High School
- In office 1945–1949
- Preceded by: Frank Milner
- Succeeded by: Malcolm Leadbetter

Personal details
- Born: James Thomas Burrows; 13 July 1904 Prebbleton, New Zealand
- Died: 10 June 1991 (aged 86) Christchurch, New Zealand
- Height: 1.80 m (5 ft 11 in)
- Weight: 79 kg (174 lb)

Rugby union career
- Position: Hooker
Amateur team(s)
Years	Team	Apps	(Points)
- Canterbury University
Provincial / State sides
Years	Team	Apps	(Points)
1923–30	Canterbury		
International career
Years	Team	Apps	(Points)
1928	New Zealand	0	(0)
Coaching career
- Years: Team
- 1932–33: Canterbury
- 1937: New Zealand
- Cricket career

Cricket information
- Batting: Right-handed
- Bowling: Right-arm medium pace
- Role: Opening bowler

Domestic team information
- Years: Team
- 1926/27–1932/33: Canterbury
- First-class debut: 25 December 1926 v Auckland
- Last First-class: 3 February 1933 v Otago

Career statistics
Competition	First-class
Matches	9
Runs scored	36
Batting average	–
100s/50s	0/0
Top score	14*
Balls bowled	1938
Wickets	31
Bowling average	22.06
5 wickets in innings	0
10 wickets in match	0
Best bowling	4–24
Catches/stumpings	4/0

Brigadier James Thomas Burrows CBE DSO* ED (13 July 1904 – 10 June 1991) was a New Zealand teacher, sportsman, administrator, and military leader.

Burrows was born in Prebbleton, just outside Christchurch, New Zealand, on 13 July 1904. Following his education at Christchurch Boys' High School, he became a teacher. He graduated from Canterbury College in 1935 with a master's thesis titled A comparison between the early colonisations of New Zealand and America.

As a rugby union player, Burrows was a hooker. He represented Canterbury in 1923 and from 1925 to 1930. He was a member of the New Zealand national side, the All Blacks, on their first ever tour of South Africa in 1928. On that tour he played in nine matches and scored two tries, but he did not appear in any of the Tests. He was sole selector and coach of the Canterbury team from 1932 to 1933, and manager–coach for the All Blacks in their 1937 series against South Africa.

Burrows also played nine first-class matches for the Canterbury cricket team in the Plunket Shield between 1926 and 1933. An opening bowler, he took 4 for 24 when Canterbury dismissed Auckland for 56 in 1931–32. Batting customarily at number eleven, he had the unusual record of never being dismissed in any of his 12 innings.

A Territorial Force officer, Burrows volunteered for overseas service during the Second World War. Serving in Greece, Crete, North Africa and Italy, he rose to the rank of brigadier. He was made a Companion of the Distinguished Service Order (DSO) in 1942, and awarded a bar to the DSO in 1944.

Leaving the army in 1944, Burrows became rector of Waitaki Boys' High School. He resigned this position in 1949 and rejoined the Army, serving as commander of the New Zealand force in Korea in 1953. In 1953, Burrows was awarded the Queen Elizabeth II Coronation Medal. He served as commander of the Southern Military District from 1955 to 1960, and finished his military career as regional commissioner for Civil Defence from 1960 to 1972.

Burrows published an autobiography, Pathway Among Men (ISBN 0723303789), in 1974. He died in Christchurch on 10 June 1991.
