= Ian Milner =

New Zealand Rhodes scholar

Ian Frank George Milner (6 June 1911 – 31 May 1991) was a New Zealand Rhodes Scholar at New College, Oxford who had attended Waitaki Boys' High School. He was then a political scientist, a civil servant with the Australian Department of External Affairs in Canberra and with the United Nations in New York, and, from the early 1950s, a professor of English at Charles University in Prague where he became the friend and translator into English of the eminent Czech poet Miroslav Holub.

He had been implicated in the 1954 Petrov Affair during which he was named by an Australian Royal Commission as a KGB agent. During his time at the Department of External Affairs, his code name was said to have been "Bur". Later when a New Zealand newspaper, Truth, labelled him "a Red menace", two universities that had invited him to lecture in New Zealand withdrew their invitation.

Ian Milner was the son of one of New Zealand's most respected headmasters, Frank Milner, of Waitaki Boys' High School in Oamaru, usually known as "the Man".

He was one of a group of five young New Zealand scholars who went to Oxford University in the 1930s and subsequently distinguished themselves in war and revolution; James Bertram, Geoffrey Cox, Dan Davin, and John Mulgan were the others.

== Espionage ==
Late in 1944, Milner was appointed to the Post-Hostilities Division (P-HD) of the Australian Government's then Department of External Affairs. In 1945, Milner allegedly stole a number of classified documents and passed copies of the documents to the Soviet embassy through an agent code-named KLOD, who was a key organiser of the Soviet Union's intelligence gathering activities in Australia and who was believed to be Walter Seddon Clayton.

Declassified Venona reports, including intercepted cable traffic from the Soviet embassy in Canberra to Moscow, show that Milner regularly passed classified British post-war strategic planning documents to the Soviets between 1945 and 1946.

From 1947 to 1949, Milner worked in New York with the Australian contingent in the Political Office of the United Nations Security Council. His work covered problems in the Balkan states, Middle East, and Korea. Milner appears to have actively continued to work with Soviet intelligence while posted to New York. He and his wife held deeply anti-American views and the United States Government is believed to have opened a security file on him.

One of Milner's colleagues from the Department of External Affairs, Jim Hill, was transferred to London in June 1950. Hill and Milner are said to have had similar sympathetic views of the Soviet Union. Shortly after arrival, Hill, code-named TOURIST, was interrogated by MI5 on suspicion of being a Soviet agent. Hill was not charged with treason, but was moved to a role that no longer provided access to sensitive information. It is likely that Milner was warned of Hill's interrogation by his Soviet handlers during a short holiday to Switzerland in June 1950. Milner defected to Czechoslovakia in July 1950 where he became an English teacher at Charles University in Prague.

From Prague, Milner denied ever being member of the Communist Party of Australia or wittingly divulging confidential information to any unauthorised person.

== Insights on the Prague Spring ==
Milner documented the 1968 Prague Spring from a pro-communist perspective. His correspondence provides evidence of support for the reforms led by Alexander Dubček, specifically those seeking to establish a model of socialism independent of Soviet control.
