= James Bertram (New Zealand writer) =

New Zealand scholar

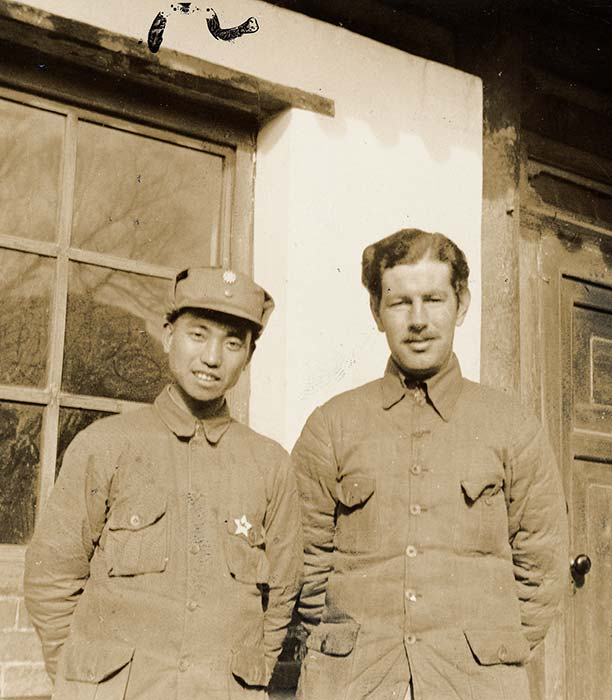
James Munro Bertram (right) in 1939

James Munro Bertram (11 August 1910 – 24 August 1993) was a New Zealand Rhodes scholar, a journalist, writer, relief worker, prisoner of war and a university professor.

== Early life and influences ==
Bertram was born in Auckland on 11 August 1910, son of Ivo Edgar Bertram, a Presbyterian minister, and his wife, Evelyn Susan Bruce. His great-grandparents on both sides had arrived in Wellington in the 1840s. He spent ten years of his childhood in Melbourne and Sydney, and attended church schools. He returned to New Zealand for secondary schooling at Waitaki Boys' High School, where he befriended Charles Brasch and Ian Milner (the son of headmaster Frank Milner). Between 1929 and 1931 he studied English literature at Auckland University College, where he met the third of his closest friends, J. A. W. Bennett. He edited a literary magazine, Phoenix, and with Bennett co-edited a Student Christian Movement magazine, Open Windows. In 1932 Bertram received a Diploma in Journalism and was awarded a Rhodes Scholarship.

Bertram was briefly a student volunteer special constable during the Queen Street riots of April 1932, to find that his sympathies for those from less-privileged backgrounds had grown.

== Oxford ==
Studying at New College, Oxford, he was awarded a first class honours degree in English in 1934 and a second class honours in Modern Languages (French and German) the following year. He was active in rugby and left-wing clubs including the University Labour Club and he initiated an Oxford Branch of the Independent Labour Party. During university vacations he visited Italy in 1933, the Soviet Union in 1934, Germany in 1935 where in Munich he witnessed a rally led by Hitler, and visited the Soviet Union for a second time in 1936.

Following Oxford Bertram was briefly an international correspondent with The Times in London but left after the editor Geoffrey Dawson refused to run his article predicting a sweeping victory for Labour in the New Zealand 1935 general election. He then took a short-term teaching position at St. Paul's School, in Hammersmith before accepting an offer by the Rhodes Trust in late 1935 for a one-year travelling fellowship to Japan and China. He was twenty-five at the time.

== Beiping ==
In January 1936 Bertram arrived in Beiping with commissions from several British publications including The Times, the Manchester Guardian and the New Statesman to write freelance articles on Asian issues.

In Beijing Bertram studied Chinese including at Yenching University where one of the men he shared a room with was Wang Rumei who was later to be better known under his Communist Party name of Huang Hua as the longest-serving foreign minister of the PRC after Zhou Enlai. Bertram's other roommate was Zhang Zhaolin (Chang Chao-lin) who was to become the editor of a Xi'an (Sian) daily newspaper under the control of Nationalist General Zhang Xueliang.

In Beijing Bertram also met American correspondent Edgar Snow, who had been teaching journalism at Yenching University, and his wife Peg Snow. Bertram later wrote that "Meeting the Snows was for me the real turning point in my discovery of modern China". Soon after Bertram's arrival in Beiping, Snow travelled to north-west China on a trip which was to produce in 1937 what Bertram described as the "classical scoop of modern Asian reporting, Red Star over China, which told the world the story of Mao Zedong, Zhu De and their associates". Snow introduced Bertram to key figures as Soong Ching-ling (the widow of Sun Yat-sen), New Zealander Rewi Alley, the Chinese writer Lu Xun, and the American revolutionary activist Agnes Smedley.

== Xi'an Incident ==
On 12 December 1936, in Beiping Bertram observed an anti-Japanese student demonstration of some five thousand students which he described in his article "The Twelfth of December". It was later learnt that General Chiang Kai-shek had been seized earlier that day by the Northeastern Army troops loyal to General Zhang Xueliang in Xi'an until Chiang agreed to enter into a united front with the Communist forces against the Japanese. Bertram travelled to in a difficult eleven-day journey including crossing the frozen over Yellow River on foot to report on what later became known as the Xi'an Incident. He was the only foreign journalist to reach the city which was under blockade by the Kuomintang. Mail and telegraph communications being blocked, Bertram joined Agnes Smedley in providing radio reports on the situation in the rebel capital during his month-long stay. The Xi'an Incident is seen now as a turning point in modern Chinese history as it marked the formal end of the ten-year civil war between Nationalists and Communists and the beginning of an effective United Front of resistance to Japan.

On the basis of his Xi'an reports, Bertram's Rhodes travelling fellowship was renewed for a second year. Back in Beijing, together with Edgar Snow he founded an English-language journal 'Democracy' which was translated into Chinese and widely circulated. The material published in the journal formed the core of his book Crisis in China (1937) which he wrote in the home of Ida Pruitt.

In July 1937, shortly after arriving in Tokyo on his first visit, Japan launched the second phase of its invasion of China. Bertram hurriedly returned to Beijing just days before the Japanese captured the city. Together with Edgar Snow, they evacuated to Tianjin (Tientsin) with Zhou Enlai's wife Deng Yingchao disguised as Snow's household servant before finding their way back to Xi'an.

== Yan'an and the North China Front ==
In Xi'an Bertram received a radio message from Mao Zedong, inviting him to become the first official 'British' visitor to Yan'an. Bertram spent nearly a month in Yan'an during which time he conducted an extensive series of interviews with Mao in his cave-dwelling during which Mao expounded the Japanese objectives and the strategies he believed that the Chinese should adopt to defeat the Japanese. "Interview with the British Journalist James Bertram" was cited in Mao's Collected Works.

From Yan'an Bertram set out for the Eighth Route Army headquarters in southern Shanxi (Shansi) and travelled for five months with the army in northern China. On the day that he crossed the Yellow River from Shaanxi (Shensi) back to Shanxi, this time by boat, Taiyuan the Shanxi capital fell to the Japanese. Most of his time was spent with the troops of General He Long(Ho Lung). Based on these experiences behind the front Bertram wrote a book North China Front (1939).

== Relief work and Soong Ching-ling ==
Bertram began to more actively support China's war against the Japanese, and carried out aid work with the China Defence League (CDL) under Soong Ching-ling. The CDL was a relief committee formed in Hong Kong to help maintain Norman Bethune and the International Peace Hospitals in China's northern war area. During this time Bertram gave fund-raising lectures in the US and led a convoy of supply trucks with petrol and medical supplies from Haiphong in Vietnam to Yan'an. Part-way through this journey England declared war on Germany. "Suddenly I remembered I was a New Zealander; I caught the first plane back, and came home.". The first troop contingent being already fully enlisted, he was given permission to return to China and early in 1940 he arrived in Hong Kong to continue work on the organisation of medical relief with the CDL and also with the British Ministry of Information, spending his time between Hong Kong and the Chinese war time capital of Chongqing (Chungking).

== Prisoner-of-war ==
From January 1941 he also spent a few months as relief press attaché to the British ambassador in Chongqing, which involved bringing a British supply convoy over the Burma Road from Rangoon. He returned to Hong Kong and played a role in assisting Soong Ching-ling and her sister Soong Ai-ling to evacuate to Chongqing hours before Hong Kong fell to the Japanese. Captured by the Japanese as a volunteer gunner in December 1941 he spent two years in Hong Kong as prisoner-of-war during which time he caught diphtheria. This was followed by two more difficult years as a prisoner-of-war in the Omori camp in Tokyo Bay spent doing forced labour in railyards and on the Tokyo docks. Bertram witnessed first hand the devastating effect of the bombing of the Tokyo-Yokohama area, and saw the coming of the victorious Allies by air and sea after the Japanese surrender in 1945. In later years, rather than talk of his experience as a Japanese prisoner-of-war, he would direct people to books by Sir Laurens van der Post saying 'they are true, in a way few other books about the Japanese are'. Bertram thought it unlikely that many of the 350,000 prisoners still held by the Japanese in 1945 would have survived had the war not been brought to a sudden end by the atomic bomb.

== Far Eastern Commission ==
In early 1946 Bertram was back in Japan as an adviser to the New Zealand delegation led by Sir Carl Berendsen to the Far Eastern Commission, which was working out the details of Occupation policy under the Allied Supreme Commander, General Douglas MacArthur. Bertram described "this unexpected trip as therapeutic; it gave the opportunity to work off all the hangovers of prison camp, and perhaps help in one or two small ways to see that belated justice was done". He saw some of his former captors and participated in the demolition of the Omori camp.

== Repatriation to New Zealand ==
Bertram returned to New Zealand in 1946 and wrote The Shadow of a War: a New Zealand in the Far East, 1939-1946, a personal narrative of his experience during the Second World War and Japanese prisoner-of-war camps. Predicting that the Communists would win out over the Kuomintang, he decided against returning to China. "... life wasn't going to be easy for foreigners in China, while the two main factions fought it out ... But could even Alley survive, caught between KMT and Communists, and the near-bandit troops of local Moslem warlords?"

In early 1947 he obtained a senior lectureship in English at Victoria University College, Wellington, where he taught until his retirement in 1975. In 1947, fifteen years after they had first met, Bertram married Jean Ellen Stevenson, an editor with the New Zealand Listener and they settled in the Hutt Valley (near Wellington) in 1949. They shared an interest in horse-riding and building a garden out of a couple of acres of hillside bush.

== China relief work ==
Bertram also travelled throughout the country as Appeals Organizer for the Council of Organizations for Relief Services Overseas (CORSO), directing aid to Soong Ching-ling's orphanages and to Rewi Alley's Chinese Industrial Cooperatives (also known by the abbreviation Indusco or the Chinese name Gung-Ho. He considered that "Alley's reputation at the time was comparable with that of a Dr Schweitzer or a Mother Teresa...The Bailie Training School at Shandan (Sandan) in the far north-west remained as a nursery of Chinese industrial apprentices and cooperative organizers, with Alley as its headmaster and inspiration."

In 1940 Bertram had acted as intermediary for Rewi Alley in an effort to secure 150 New Zealand stud sheep for Alley's Bailie School at Shandan in Gansu. Due to chaotic war time conditions, the sheep were offloaded in Calcutta and in 1944 were rediscovered in Tibet. In 1946 the chance came again for Bertram to help get New Zealand sheep to the Bailie School. An UNRRA ship was taking a stud flock to China and Bertram organised a public appeal, as a result of which an additional 50 sheep were purchased and earmarked for the Bailie School. In 1986, nearly 40 years later, Bertram finally visited Shandan and saw the descendants of the original flock.

== Support for New Zealand literature ==
Bertram was a strong supporter of New Zealand literature. He helped Charles Brasch to found the Landfall journal, and wrote many literary reviews, especially for the New Zealand Listener. He specialised in the lives and work of nineteenth century British poets A. H. Clough, Matthew Arnold and his younger brother Thomas Arnold the Younger who arrived in New Zealand in 1848. Bertram sorted and edited a collection of letters by Thomas Arnold from 1847 to 1851. "I felt I might begin with a critical study of Clough's poetry, then switch to the impulsive Tom Arnold, whose abrupt changes of political and religious faith covered in one lifetime the whole gamut of Victorian disbelief and belief. I could not help feeling that this inner circle of Dr Arnold's favourite pupils ...had some resemblance to our own little Waitaki group, Frank Milner's cognoscenti, just as painfully caught between Nietzsche, Freud, and Marx, between C.S. Lewis and Teilhard de Chardin."

Bertram was awarded the title of Emeritus Professor of English in 1971. After his retirement in 1975 he was general editor of the New Zealand Writers and their Work series, wrote on Charles Brasch and Dan Davin, and edited Brasch's memoir, Indirections. In 1981 he received an honorary LittD. In 1985 Bertram published some of his reflections on New Zealand writers in Flight of the Phoenix.

== Asian Studies advocacy ==
Academic interests were evenly divided between Bertram's Clough-Arnold project and his own strong wish to promote Asian studies at Victoria. In earlier years, after returning to New Zealand, he had run evening classes on China, Japan and Far Eastern affairs. In 1960 he accepted a Carnegie travel grant to prepare an extended report on both English literature and Oriental studies as taught in North American universities. He was, however, unsuccessful; when the university did make an appointment in Asian studies, the university chose an expert in the politics of Indonesia who had no interest in any major Asian language.

== Return visits to China ==
In 1956 Bertram visited China again with a New Zealand cultural group. The Chinese government's invitation came to Ormond Wilson, a former labour MP, and to R. A. K. Mason, a poet and chairman of the China Friendship Society, to assemble a representative group of New Zealanders for an all-expenses paid visit to visit China and attend the May Day celebrations in Beijing. Cold War hostilities meant that no official New Zealand support was forthcoming for the visit, although New Zealand had not gone as far as the US and Australia in withdrawing passports from those who planned to visit China. Initially Victoria University had refused leave for Bertram but later relented.

Bertram wrote that in 1956 China was doing its best to present a relaxed and liberal image to the world. "No one at this time, could have foreseen the savage rift with Krushchev's Russia that was to follow, still less the internal tensions and sudden violent excesses of the so-called Cultural Revolution." (pp. 300–301, Capes of China). During the Beijing visit he was re-introduced to his old friends including his former roommate at Yenching University, now Deputy Foreign Minister, Huang Hua and Rewi Alley. Premier Zhou Enlai hosted a welcoming function at which they were introduced to senior leaders of the regime including Mao Zedong, He Long, Zhu De, Peng Dehuai and Liu Shaoqi. In Shanghai Bertram met up with Soong Ching-ling who had founded the China Welfare Institute, heir to the old China Defence League. Bertram wrote up the expedition in a book Return to China.

In 1986 he travelled to China as an honorary guest of the Chinese government for the fiftieth anniversary of Chiang Kai-shek's capture during the Xi'an Incident, and also visited the Shandan Bailie School for the first time.

== Political views ==
For some years Bertram remained active in left-wing groups such as the Society for Closer Relations with Russia and was the first president of the Wellington Branch of the New Zealand China Friendship Society. After his 1956 China visit as part of a New Zealand cultural delegation, he wrote "All of us, I have no doubt, were trying to tell the truth as we saw it. And my own liking for China and the Chinese gives me a bias from the start, which I readily admit. But I have certainly no bias in favour of Communist theory and a very considerable bias against Communist practice. Liberal humanism is an un-fashionable and perhaps an ineffectual creed; it is the only one I can profess.". While Bertram was an admirer of Rewi Alley, who he described as a 'remarkable New Zealander' he also wrote "I didn't like the tone of Rewi's books about the New China; everything was black and white, all the key issues seemed over-simplified".

== Christian belief ==
Bertram described himself as 'at least a nominal Christian', up to the end of his university years. When in China he had stopped attending church although there were a few practical Christians he greatly admired. In 1947 Bertram was married at the Auckland registry office as he had left off churchgoing too long to feel a church service appropriate. However, he remained an occasional church-goer, remaining as an adherent of the Scottish Presbyterian Church and in later years he and his wife returned to full communion with the Presbyterian church. He wrote "I think we were the better for it, though I remain convinced that the only consolations of religion that really matter are those that are hardest to take.".

James Bertram died in Lower Hutt on 24 August 1993, survived by his wife Jean. They had no children.

== Works ==
Bertram had a number of works published. (this section needs further research)

=== Asia ===
- Crisis in China, MacMillan & Co, 1937. Also published under the title of 'First Act in China - The Story of the Sian Mutiny'. New York, The Viking press, 1938.
- North China Front, MacMillan & Co, London 1939. Published as "Unconquered. Journal of a year's adventures among the fighting peasants of north China" in New York by The John Day Company, 1939. Includes interviews with Chairman Mao and Zhou Enlai.
- Beneath the Shadow; a New Zealander in the Far East, 1939–46. New York, J. Day Co. 1947. Published as "The Shadow of a War" in London and New Zealand.
- Return to China. London, William Heinemann Ltd, 1957.
- The young Traveller in China today. London, Phoenix House, 1961
- Capes of China slide away : a memoir of peace and war, 1910-1980 Auckland : Auckland University Press; [New York] : Distributed outside New Zealand by Oxford University Press, 1993.

Bertram's works have been published in China in both English and Chinese. Bertram's Chinese name is 贝特兰 (pinyin Bèi Tèlán).

- First Act in China：The Story of the Sian Mutiny, James Bertram. Foreign Languages Press, 2003. 中国第一幕:西安事变(新西兰)贝特兰 （外文出版社 2003）
- North China Front. (English edition), James Bertram. Foreign Languages Publishing Press, 2004. 华北前线（英文版） 贝特兰(James Bertram) (作者) （外文出版社 2004）
- Return to China. (English edition), James Bertram. Foreign Languages Publishing Press, 2004. 重返中国（英文版） 贝特兰(James Bertram) (作者) （外文出版社 2004）
- First Act in China：The Story of the Sian Mutiny, James Bertram. Shaanxi People's Publishing Press, December 2007. Translator Niu Yulan 中国的第一幕—西安事变秘闻—贝特兰 (作者), 牛玉林 (译者)出 版：陕西人民出版社 2007.12

=== New Zealand and other works ===
- New Zealand Rhodes scholars, year and publisher not known.
- The adventures of Chanticleer and Partlet. Translated from the German. Authors: Jacob Grimm; Wilhelm Grimm; James M Bertram; Christchurch, Caxton Press, 1941.
- New Zealand letters of Thomas Arnold the younger with further letters from Van Diemen's Land and letters of Arthur Hugh Clough, 1847–1851. Authors: Thomas Arnold; Arthur Hugh Clough; James M Bertram. University of Auckland; London, Wellington, Oxford University Press, 1966.
- Occasional verses, Wellington: Wai-te-ata Press, 1971.
- Towards a New Zealand literature, Dunedin, Hocken Library, 1971.
- Charles Brasch, last Landfall. Wellington: New York : Oxford University Press, 1976.
- New Zealand Love Poems. Dunedin: J. McIndoe, 1977.
- Dan Davin, Auckland: New York : Oxford University Press, 1983.
- Flight of the Phoenix: Critical Notes on New Zealand authors. Victoria : Victoria University Press, 1985.
- New Zealand poets in retrospect : eight New Zealand poets, no longer living, are placed in social and poetic context, Katherine Mansfield, Robin Hyde, Charles Brasch, R.A.K. Mason, A.R.D. Fairburn, James K. Baxter, Denis Glover, M.K. Joseph. James M Bertram; Replay Radio (N.Z.) Wellington, Radio New Zealand, Replay Radio,1986.

=== Autobiography ===
Bertram's 1992 autobiography Capes of China Slide Away: A memoir of peace and war 1910-1980. drew on material covered in Bertram's earlier books, Crisis in China, North China Front and The Shadow of a War. In the foreword to Capes of China Slide Away Bertram wrote 'I am more Marco Polo than Rousseau. If there is any lasting interest in the chapters that follow, it is probably in the nature of the material. I was a not atypical middle-class New Zealander of my own war generation but some of my experience was perhaps out of the common run. China and Japan are nearer to us now than they seemed fifty years ago; we all need to know more about them. So I hope in my recollections of some critical years of war and revolution may throw light, for readers, on recent history in the Pacific zone.'

=== New Zealand's China Experience ===
Two of Bertram's articles were included in New Zealand's China Experience, published with the assistance of the New Zealand Ministry of Foreign Affairs and Trade to mark the fortieth anniversary of the establishment of diplomatic relations between New Zealand and the People's Republic of China. The first piece was "The Twelfth of December" in which Bertram wrote about an anti-Japanese student demonstration in Beijing in 1936 on the day that the Xi'an Incident took place. The second article was "The Way to Yenan" describing Bertram's invitation by Mao Zedong 'to become the first official British visitor to Yan'an' (Yenan) and Bertram's attendance at Mao's lecture on the political work of the Eighth Route Army.

=== Works on James Bertram ===
James McNeish wrote about Bertram in his book Dance of the Peacocks, New Zealanders in exile in the time of Hitler and Mao Tse-tung. Based on the story of five diverse yet closely connected New Zealanders, Dance of the Peacocks is the story of a group of Rhodes scholars who went to Oxford, but couldn't come home again: James Munro Bertram, Dan Davin, Geoffrey Cox, Ian Milner, and John Mulgan.

== James Bertram Scholarship ==
In commemoration of the role Bertram played in furthering New Zealand's relations with China, Rodney Jones and Sajini Jesudason established the James Bertram Scholarships. Scholarship students study at Victoria for a year, and then have six months language tuition in Beijing before embarking on a year's study at Peking University. Students graduate with a double Masters in International Relations and Public Policy from Victoria and Peking Universities respectively. The scholarships were launched at Victoria University in July 2010 and were announced in Beijing by the New Zealand Prime Minister, the Rt Hon John Key.
