= Walter Clayton =

Walter Clayton may refer to:

- Walter Clayton Jr. (born 2003), American basketball player
- Walter F. Clayton, American architect, builder, and politician from New York
- Walter J. Clayton III, known as Jay Clayton, American attorney and Chairman of the U.S. Securities and Exchange Commission
- Walter Seddon Clayton, organiser of the Communist Party of Australia
- Walter Clayton, co-founder of Noorduyn Aircraft Limited
