= Miroslav Holub =

Czech poet

MUDr. Miroslav Holub DrSc.
- Born: 13 September 1923; Plzeň, Czechoslovakia
- Died: 14 July 1998 (aged 74); Prague, Czech Republic
- Education: Czechoslovak Academy of Sciences
- Occupations: poet, immunologist
- Writing career
- Language: Czech
- Years active: 1958–96

Miroslav Holub (pronounced [mɪrɔslaf ɦɔlʊp]; 13 September 1923 – 14 July 1998) was a Czech poet and immunologist.

Holub's work was heavily influenced by his experiences as an immunologist, writing many poems using his scientific knowledge to poetic effect. His work is almost always unrhymed, so lends itself easily to translation. It has been translated into more than 30 languages and is especially popular in the English-speaking world. Although one of the most internationally well-known Czech poets, his reputation continues to languish at home.

Holub was born in Plzeň. His first book in Czech was Denní služba (1958), which abandoned the somewhat Stalinist bent of poems earlier in the decade (published in magazines).

In English, he was first published in the Observer in 1962, and five years later a Selected Poems appeared in the Penguin Modern European Poets imprint, with an introduction by Al Alvarez and translations by Ian Milner and George Theiner. Holub's work was lauded by many, including Ted Hughes and Seamus Heaney (eg there are five poems by Holub in their 1982 anthology The Rattle Bag), and his influence is visible in Hughes' collection Crow (1970).

In addition to poetry, Holub wrote many short essays on various aspects of science, particularly biology and medicine (specifically immunology) and life. A collection of these, titled The Dimension of the Present Moment, is still in print. In the 1960s, he published two books of what he called 'semi-reportage' about extended visits to the United States.

Under the fictitious name "Jaromil," Holub figures prominently in Patricia Hampl's memoir of her Czech heritage, A Romantic Education, first published in 1981 and reissued in 1999 with an Afterword revealing his real name.

The minor planet 7496 Miroslavholub, an outer main belt asteroid, is named in his honour.

== Works in translation ==
- Vanishing Lung Syndrome, trans. David Young and Dana Habova (Oberlin College Press, 1990). ISBN 0-932440-52-5; (Faber and Faber, 1990). ISBN 0-571-14339-3
- Intensive Care: Selected and New Poems, ed. David Young (Oberlin College Press, 1996). ISBN 0-932440-76-2
- The Rampage, trans. David Young, Dana Hábová, Rebekah Bloyd and the author (Faber and Faber 1997) ISBN 0-571-19253-X
- Poems Before and After: Collected English Translations (Bloodaxe Books; 2nd ed. 2006). ISBN 1-85224-747-9
- Shedding Life: Disease, Politics and Other Human Conditions trans. David Young, with assistance from Dana Habova, Todd Morath, Vera Orac, Catarina Vocadlova, and the author (Milkweed Editions, 1997). ISBN 1-57131-217-X
- Supposed to Fly trans. Ewald Osers (Bloodaxe Books; 1996). ISBN 1 85224 274 4
- The Fly trans. Ewald Osers, George Theiner, Ian & Jarmila Milner (Bloodaxe Books; 1987). ISBN 1 85224 018 0
- The Vintage Book of Contemporary World Poetry, edited by J. D. McClatchy, Vintage Books, 1996. ISBN 0-679-74115-1, 9780679741152.
