= Desmond Patrick Costello =

New Zealand linguist and academic (1912–1964)

Desmond Patrick Costello (31 January 1912 – 23 February 1964) was a New Zealand-born linguist, soldier, diplomat and university lecturer and professor who has been accused of being a KGB agent.

== Early life ==
Costello was born in Auckland, the second son of what was to become a family of six children. His father Christopher had been born in Dublin in 1867 and gone to Australia, probably in 1887, where he met and married in 1905 Mary Woods, born in Melbourne in 1885. She was the daughter of Irish-born Patrick and Elizabeth Woods, whose family in County Kilkenny in Ireland Paddy Costello later visited frequently.

After they were married Christopher and Mary went to Auckland, where he became a grocer and the family lived over or behind the various shops he ran until his death in 1923. Most of these were in the middle-class suburb of Devonport, where Costello started school at the local Catholic school. He later transferred to Ponsonby school, possibly because the scholarship he sought was available only to children at state schools. In any event he won the scholarship and went to Auckland Grammar School and passed his university entrance examination in 1927, aged only 15.

== University studies ==
From 1928 until 1931, on more scholarships, Costello attended the Auckland University College of the University of New Zealand, completing his BA in 1930 and MA in 1931 with first class honours in Greek and Latin.

In 1932, Costello was awarded a postgraduate arts scholarship and attended Trinity College, Cambridge, until 1934, graduating with first class honours in the classical tripos. He was elected a scholar of Trinity and won a research studentship for a year at the British School at Athens. Already fluent in French, German, Italian, Spanish and Greek, he would later learn Gaelic, Russian and Persian.

In 1935, Costello became a senior research scholar at Trinity and married Bella (Bil) Lerner, the London-born daughter of a Jewish family with Ukrainian origins. They went on to have five children. She was a member of the Communist Party of Great Britain, with Costello joining while in Cambridge. He was likely under the influence of contemporaries such as James Klugmann and John Cornford, both prominent members of the Party and influential figures in the Cambridge University Socialist Society, which also included Kim Philby, Guy Burgess and Donald Maclean. Costello later claimed to have resigned from the Party before the war.

In 1936 Costello was appointed lecturer in classics at the University College of the South West in Exeter, a position from which he was dismissed in 1940 because of his left-wing political activities and his associations with a student who had been convicted of an offence under the Official Secrets Act.

== WWII and diplomatic service ==
=== Army service ===
Following his dismissal Costello enlisted in the 2nd New Zealand Division, and in 1941 sailed for Greece with the 21st Battalion, later being evacuated to Crete and then Cairo. After attending an officer training school he was commissioned second lieutenant and joined the Long Range Desert Group. In 1942 he was seconded to Eighth Army GCHQ, but was later transferred back to the 2nd New Zealand Division as divisional intelligence officer to General Freyberg, and promoted to captain.

=== Moscow posting ===
Because of his knowledge of Russian, Costello was seconded to the New Zealand Department of External Affairs in May 1944 and in August arrived in Moscow with the New Zealand Minister to open the new Legation. In 1945 he was recalled to the Army and as Major Costello was one of a party sent to Poland, ostensibly to arrange the repatriation of liberated British and Commonwealth prisoners, but also to report on conditions there. While in Poland, Costello visited and wrote a report on Majdanek concentration camp and talked to two survivors from Auschwitz. His report covered both camps. It was widely circulated in London including to other embassies and the press.

Between July and October 1946 he was a member of the New Zealand delegation at the Paris Peace Conference. During his time in Moscow, Costello got to know the Russian author Boris Pasternak, and was instrumental in getting to Pasternak's sisters in Oxford (via others at the Legation and his friend Dan Davin in Oxford) some of his famous novel Doctor Zhivago. In 1950 Costello closed the Legation in Moscow, following a change of Government in New Zealand.

Costello's despatches from Moscow were so well-informed and penetrating as to suggest to some critics that he had sources beyond those available to other diplomats, and he was thus a spy. There is no evidence for this suggestion beyond the standard of the reports, which are attributable to the force of Costello's mind and his knowledge of Russian; in any event, it would have been foolish for the Russian authorities to have given him information not otherwise available, and thus draw attention to him.

=== New Zealand visit and Paris posting ===
In 1950 Costello paid his only visit to New Zealand since he had left in 1932 at the age of 20. While there he was arrested for public drunkenness and later informed by Alister McIntosh, then-head of the Department of External Affairs, that his career was finished and he should begin to look for other employment. Costello however remained employed until 1955, as his posting as First Secretary of the New Zealand Legation in Paris had already been arranged and was allowed to proceed following a severe reprimand from Prime Minister Holland.

It was from Costello's time in Paris between 1950 and 1955 that the primary allegations of his involvement with the KGB arose. In 1951, following a security assessment of Costello carried out by MI5, the Foreign Office issued a warning about him to the UK embassy in Paris, which resulted in ‘very special precautions’ being taken ‘to ensure that Costello does not have access to important British information’, as the Foreign Office described it. Late in 1951 the then Director-General of MI5, Sir Percy Sillitoe, was in New Zealand and raised formally with both Holland and McIntosh the case of Costello, the MI5 view of him, and the security sanctions which the UK Embassy had put in place, to the detriment of the NZ Legation's work. Costello stayed in Paris until 1955.

== Manchester ==
Following the end of his term in Paris in 1955, Costello returned to academia and was appointed as chair of the Russian department at the University of Manchester. He held this position until his death in 1964 at the age of 52, survived by his wife and five children. The cause of death was listed as coronary thrombosis and arteriosclerosis. He was mourned by colleagues, and his best friend and fellow intelligence officer Dan Davin wrote an obituary for The Times.

== Spying allegations ==
While all the allegations surfaced after Costello's death, he was while still alive questioned about one incident which occurred while he was in Paris. In 1961 several people were arrested in London and charged with spying; all were later convicted. Two of them were a married couple, Peter and Helen Kroger, who had been living in England for six years and who had New Zealand passports issued to them by the New Zealand Legation in Paris in May 1954. Inquiries established that their real names were Morris and Lona Cohen, who had been part of a successful KGB spy ring in the US in the 1940s. They had obtained the New Zealand passports using forged documents. As noted, Costello had been the First Secretary at the New Zealand Legation in Paris in 1954. When questioned after the arrests, he denied any knowledge of the Krogers, and no further action was taken. As noted below, he was later accused of having issued the passports, thus in the eyes of his accusers proving that he was a Russian spy.

In chronological order, the allegations are as follows.

In 1981, Chapman Pincher published Their Trade is Treachery, which contained the allegation that Anthony Blunt had ‘pointed the finger’ at Costello ‘who might have been recruited as a spy’. Pincher's source was Peter Wright, formerly of MI5, who had interrogated Blunt over many years after he had been identified as a spy. (It is worth noting in passing that another of Pincher's claims here - that Costello was observed meeting a Soviet agent shortly before his death - is borne out by the MI5 file on Costello, which was made public in 2017.) It also contained the allegation that Costello ‘had signed New Zealand passports for Peter and Helen Kroger’. Inquiries later established that the passports were in fact authorised and issued by Jean McKenzie, the chargé d'affaires at the Legation, the only person there empowered to do so; but controversy continues about the role played by Costello, based on defectors’ accounts and handwriting analysis.

In 1989, John Costello [no relation] published Mask of Treachery, quoting the KGB defector Golitsin as having revealed that it was Costello who had arranged the New Zealand passports for the Krogers in Paris in 1954. Costello added that ‘a senior American intelligence source’ had provided confirmation that Costello was ‘a long-term Soviet agent’. This allegation is also confirmed by the MI5 file. Golitsin's codename was "Kago", and he is referred to by that name at serial 270a on the MI5 file, a memorandum from MI5's man in Wellington to head office, dated 21 June 1963. This referred to revelations by "Kago" that evidently went beyond Costello, to include some of his colleagues in the New Zealand Legation in Moscow, about whom the Security Service then began ‘exhaustive inquiries’. This is entirely plausible: Alister McIntosh told the New Zealand author Michael King in 1978 that ‘Paddy of course was a terrific personality and he influenced the whole of the staff [in Moscow] except Patrick’.

In 1999, Christopher Andrew and Vasili Mitrokhin [another KGB defector] published The Mitrokhin Archive: The KGB in Europe and the West, in which Costello is identified as ‘a valuable agent’ in Paris and as one of ten ‘particularly valuable’ agents there. Mitrokhin was an archivist for the KGB for many years; disillusioned by the Communist regime, he began keeping notes of documents to which he had access, many of them to do with spies for the KGB in western countries, apart from those in Soviet Embassies. The veracity of Mitrokhin's notes has not only not been challenged, but has been repeatedly confirmed.

In 2000, Michael King wrote to Prime Minister Helen Clark seeking documents about Costello and another New Zealander suspected of spying, William Ball Sutch. Based on his 1978 interviews with Alister McIntosh, he said that ‘McIntosh believed that both men had been working for the Russians at times when they were employed by the New Zealand Government, and produced evidence to this effect’. The evidence King attributes to McIntosh has not come to light.

In 2002, the NZ Security Intelligence Service in releasing material on Costello to James McNeish said that

Some of the material released refers to links between Costello and the intelligence service of the USSR. That such a relationship existed is substantiated by other records held by the NZSIS which are unable to be released at this stage.

After the release of the MI5 file, however, the Service confirmed that it was the material on this file which was ‘the other records’ referred to here.

In 2017, as noted, the MI5 file on Costello (and his wife) was released to the UK National Archives. It showed that MI5 had obtained, in its words:"...what practically amounts to written proof that in December, 1960 Mrs Bella COSTELLO was a K.G.B. agent employed in an illegal support role"; and second "what amounts to proof that D.P. COSTELLO is also a K.G.B. agent". In another document MI5 expressed itself as being "quite sure that COSTELLO and his wife were acting in some way as agents of the Russian Intelligence Service".

More details are in Lenihan (2017).

The release of the file has not resolved the controversy as to whether Costello was a spy. Of those who have written about the file, McGibbon still considered, as he did in 2000, that ‘Final resolution of the question...still depends on revelation of records presumably lodged in the former KGB archives in Moscow’. Ricketts concluded that ‘Although the recently released MI5 files will provide ammunition for [Costello’s] detractors, they offer little more substantive proof.’ Lenihan not only claimed that the file offers further proof of Costello having been a spy, but made the further claim in 2017 that he was protected for many years by the head of MI5 at the time, Sir Roger Hollis.

The Guardian's review of the file released in 2017 produced this comment by Alan Travis, Home Affairs editor:

The MI5 files released at the National Archives ... fail to provide a conclusive answer but show that MI5 was at one stage locked in a decade-long battle with the New Zealand government over whether Costello should be dismissed as a diplomat. During this struggle, the security services were forced to concede that their case against Costello was 'a thin one'".

== Writings about Costello ==
The only book-length account of Costello's life and the spying allegations was written by James McNeish and published in 2007 as The Sixth Man: the Extraordinary Life of Paddy Costello. According to the review by The Guardian, the McNeish book is a "story of a man wrongly accused of spying for the Soviets".

Denis Lenihan disputed McNeish's assertions and conclusions in a 2012 article published at kiwispies.com.
