= Ian Cathcart =

New Zealand basketball player

Personal information
- Born: 14 February 1982 (age 44) Invercargill, New Zealand
- Listed height: 186 cm (6 ft 1 in)
- Listed weight: 92 kg (203 lb)

Career information
- High school: Waitaki Boys' (Oamaru, New Zealand)
- College: Lyon College (2001–2005)
- Playing career: 2000–2011
- Position: Guard

Career history
- 2000–2001: Otago Nuggets
- 2003: Nelson Giants
- 2005–2006: Shamrock Rovers
- 2010–2011: Southland Sharks

Ian Cathcart (born 14 February 1982) is a New Zealand former basketball player.

== Early life ==
Cathcart was born in Invercargill, New Zealand. He attended Waitaki Boys' High School in Oamaru. He grew up playing softball and BMX.

== Basketball career ==
In 2000 and 2001, Cathcart played for the Otago Nuggets in the New Zealand NBL. He also played for the North Otago Penguins in the Conference Basketball League (CBL) in 2000, helping them win the championship. In 2003, he played for the Nelson Giants in the NBL.

Between 2001 and 2005, Cathcart played college basketball in the United States for the Lyon College Scots.

For the 2005–06 season, Cathcart played in Ireland for the Shamrock Rovers. In 21 games in the Superleague, he averaged 6.4 points, 1.8 rebounds and 2.3 assists per game.

In 2008, Cathcart captained the North Otago Penguins in the CBL. The team finished third.

Cathcart joined the Southland Sharks for the 2010 New Zealand NBL season and served as the team's vice captain. He played 18 games for the Sharks in the 2010 season and made just one appearance for the Sharks in the 2011 season.

== Personal life ==
Cathcart named his first son, Boston, after his favourite NBA team, the Boston Celtics.

As of 2011, Cathcart was working as a student support adviser at the Southern Institute of Technology.
