= Winnie Davin =

Teacher, community worker, editor (1909–1995)

Winifred Kathleen Joan "Winnie" Davin (nee Gonley) (27 July 1909 – 26 March 1995) was a New Zealand teacher, community worker and editor. She was born in Otautau, Southland, New Zealand on 27 July 1909. A writer herself in her early years, she was primarily known for her encouragement and promotion of New Zealand writers. She was the wife of the writer and publisher Dan Davin and a close friend and later literary executor of Joyce Cary. One of her daughters, Delia, went on to become a leading writer on Chinese social issues.

Davin died in 1995 in Oxford, England.
