= Delia Davin =

English historian and researcher

- Born: 9 June 1944; Oxford, United Kingdom
- Died: 13 October 2016 (aged 72); Leeds, United Kingdom
- Education: University of Leeds
- Occupations: Writer, translator, lecturer
- Relatives: Dan Davin (father); Winnie Davin (mother)
- Writing career
- Notable awards: President of the British Association for Chinese Studies

Delia Davin (9 June 1944 – 13 October 2016) was a writer and lecturer on Chinese society and particularly Chinese women's stories. She was one of the first foreign scholars to consider the impact of the policies of the Chinese Communist Party on women.

From 1988 until her retirement in 2004, Davin taught Chinese history at Leeds University, where she became a chaired professor. She was also head of the Department of East Asian Studies and deputy head of the School of Modern Languages and Cultures. Before going to Leeds, she had taught in the Department of Economics and Related Studies at the University of York, where she was a founding member of York's Centre for Women's Studies. The British Association for Chinese Studies elected her president for 1993–1994, and the China Panel of the British Academy made her a member, as did the Executive Council of the Universities' China Committee in London.

== Early life ==
Davin was born in Oxford, England, to an expatriate literary family of Irish descent who had emigrated from New Zealand. Her father Dan Davin was an editor at the Clarendon Press and her mother Winnie Davin (née Gonley) was an editor at Oxford University Press. Davin left school at the age of 15 and finished her high school studies through evening classes.

In 1963, aged 19, she went to Beijing with a group of foreign experts and taught English at the Beijing Broadcasting Institute until 1965. She described her students there in a letter home as "very serious about their work but [having] a gaiety which saves them from being priggish." Her friend, the China specialist John Gittings, later remarked that her contact with these students, many of whom came from working class backgrounds, "gave Davin an intuitive understanding of the Chinese that would enrich her long academic career" and that at this time she already showed "a mature sensitivity for the contradictions of revolutionary China."

She then returned to England and enrolled at the University of Leeds, where she completed a B.A. degree in 1968 and a Ph.D. degree in 1974 in the Department of Chinese. While a student, Davin visited Paris and Hong Kong on research trips.

In 1975, Davin returned to China and worked as a translator for the Foreign Languages Press, a position arranged for her by her friends Gladys Yang and Yang Xianyi, who were also translators.

== Communist policy and women's lives ==
Davin was one of the first scholars to study Chinese Communist Party policies on women and the problems of working them out in practice. Her first major work was Woman-Work: Women and the Party in Revolutionary China (1976), which she published after returning from her second stay in Beijing. The scholar Gail Hershatter called the work "classic". She explained that the book followed policies from the 1930s until 1949, but spent the most time and detailed analysis on the 1950s. Chapters treated the Women's Federation, marriage reform, the effects of land reform and collectivization on women, and the lives of urban women. Davin, Hershatter continued, acknowledged the great changes brought about by the new leninist "Party-state", and described the contradictions between the reformist Marriage Law and the realities of its results; women in the countryside were also caught between economic independence and their continued fixed place in patrilocal families. The book, said Hershatter, "effectively laid out an agenda for much of the subsequent scholarship on women in the Mao years". John Gittings wrote that the book went "far beyond the stereotypes offered both by the communist regime and its critics" and that it probed the "tensions between a new 'socialist' emphasis on women's participation in economic and political life and a relatively unchallenged structure of gender and generational relationships in the family."

During the following years, Davin wrote articles and chapters that analyzed marriage migration, domestic service, and welfare entitlements for Chinese women workers. Her jointly edited book China's One Child Family Policy (1985) was one of the first studies of the early effects of that policy. The review in The China Journal called the essays, though written when the policy was relatively new, "a timely review of the policy's origins, problems, and prospects."

In 1999, after tracking the changes of the post-Mao economic reforms, Davin published a second major study, Internal Migration in Contemporary China, that used field research, interviews, and published media. She remarked that her own parents' "stories of the migration of their parents and grandparents from the west of Ireland to New Zealand gave me an interest in the forces that drive people to leave their homes and families in search of a living elsewhere, and a sympathy with the struggles and sufferings of migrants everywhere." Dorothy Solinger in China Quarterly wrote that the book was "more for the initiate than for the specialist," but "rich with observations and covers every major topic that touches on internal geographical movement in China since the late 1970s," including the demographic traits of the migrants, state policies, the reason farmers leave the countryside and to come to the city, and the images of these migrants in the media. Although Solinger found "carelessness" and a tendency to rely on "vague words" such "few" and "in general," she found that "overall this volume stands as an excellent summation ... and is filled with insightful comments, if not encased within an overarching framework."

Davin's interests in women's lives extended to other fields. Her 1992 article, "British Women Missionaries in Nineteenth Century China" examined women whose lives were supposed to take place only in home and family. It looked at their China careers, their effect as role models, and their own conservative views of what their influence should be.

== Studies of Mao Zedong ==
Mao Zedong was another long term focus of research and thought. The senior Mao scholar Stuart Schram both praised and criticized her 1997 biography, noting that Davin's target audience was those "without a prior knowledge of Chinese affairs". He said that writers of brief studies like hers often assume that "because the reader belongs to the uninitiated, he or she is also a semi-literate and write in basic English," or authors may take space limitations "as a pretext not merely for simplifying controversial issues, but for presenting only one side of them." Davin, however avoids both of these temptations: "she writes clearly, evoking the complexity of events and Mao's response to them without hiding her own views."

Schram then added that the book's greatest weakness was its treatment of the Yan'an period of Mao's career, in which Davin did not mention the single most important theme, that unlike the International Faction, who had parroted the Marxist dogma they learned in the Soviet Union, Mao had "creatively developed Marxism in the context of Chinese history and culture." By contrast, Schram continued, the chapters on Mao as the ruler of China "deal subtly but forcefully with all the major issues." She puts blame where blame is due: Mao bears a heavy responsibility for one of the great disasters in human history" (p. 69) and the Cultural Revolution claimed victim after victim, leaving Mao "heavily reliant on sycophants and incompetents as he himself grew older and less competent." (p. 77)

In 2013, Davin published a short biography Mao (Oxford University Press, Very Short Introduction Series; 2013) John Gittings wrote that the book "rejected current appraisals of Mao as no more than 'a Chinese Stalin with a taste for killing', while recognising that his flawed and contradictory character brought great harm to China..." The scholar Gregor Benton commented that sometimes "resisting a jumbo-history doesn't necessarily produce a compelling focus and can lapse at worst into patronizing simplification," but that in this case "a broader picture remains unremittingly central, though not at a cost of nuance and some speculative reflection."

== Personal life ==
Davin was married three times – first to William (Bill) John Francis Jenner, a fellow scholar of China; then to Andrew (Andy) Morgan; and finally in 1997 to Owen Wells, a probation officer. She had three children and three step-children. She died of cancer at home in Ilkley on 13 October 2016, aged 72.

== Selected works ==
Books

- Mao: A Very Short Introduction (Oxford University Press, 2013 ISBN 9780199588664)
- ——— (1999), Internal migration in Contemporary China, London: Macmillan; New York: St. Martin's, ISBN 9780230376717
- ——— (1997), Mao Zedong: A Life, Sutton; Reprinted History Press 2009
- ——— (1988), Chinese Lives: An Oral History of Contemporary China, co-edited with William Jenner, New York: Pantheon; London: Macmillan; reprinted, Penguin (1989)
- China's One Child Family Policy, (co-editor with E. Croll and P. Kane). Macmillan, 1985.
- Woman-Work: Women and the Party in Revolutionary China (1976).

Articles

- 'Gendered Mao: Mao, Maoism and Women' in Timothy Cheek (ed) A Critical Introduction to Mao, Cambridge University Press. 2010.
- 'Dark Tales of Mao the Merciless' in Greg Benton and Lin Chun (eds) Was Mao Really a Monster? The Academic Response to Chang and Halliday's Mao: The Unknown Story. London: Routledge June 2009.
- 'Marriage Migration In China: The Enlargement Of Marriage Markets In The Era Of Market Reforms' in Rajni Palriwala and Patricia Uberoi (eds) Marriage Migration and Gender. New Delhi: Sage, 2008.
- 'Women and Migration in Contemporary China', China Report 41:1 2005, New Delhi: Sage.
- 'The impact of export-oriented manufacturing on the welfare entitlements of Chinese women workers' in Shahra Razavi, Ruth Pearson and Caroline Danloy (eds), Globalisation, Export-oriented Employment and Social Policy: Gendered Connections, UNISD/London:Palgrave, 2004.
- 'Country maids in the city: Domestic Service as an Agent of Modernity in China' in Françoise Mengin and Jean-Louis Rocca (eds), Politics in China: Moving Frontiers, London: Palgrave 2002.
- 'Chinese Women: Media Concerns and Politics of Reform' in Afshar.H. (ed) Women and Politics in the Third World. London: Routledge, 1996.
- ——— (1992), "British Women Missionaries in Nineteenth‐Century China", Women's History Review, 1 (2): 257–271, doi:10.1080/0961202920010204
- 'British Women Missionaries in Nineteenth‐Century China', in Women's HistoryReview , Volume 1, Number 2, 1992.
- 'Population Policy and Reform: the Soviet Union, Eastern Europe and China' in Shirin Rai et al (eds). Women in the Face of Change: the Soviet Union, Eastern Europe and China. London: Routledge, 1992.
