= Dan Davin =

New Zealand writer

Daniel Marcus Davin CBE (1 September 1913 – 28 September 1990), generally known as Dan Davin, was an author who wrote about New Zealand, although for most of his career he lived in Oxford, England, working for Oxford University Press. The themes of his earliest fiction, in short stories that include Saturday Night, Late Snow, The Apostate, The Basket, The Vigil, and The Milk Round, were about "Mick Connolly" and his Irish Catholic family in largely Protestant Southland.

== Early life ==
Davin was born in Invercargill, New Zealand, into an Irish Catholic family, and was educated at local Catholic primary schools and the Catholic boys secondary school, Marist College. He won a scholarship for a final school year at Sacred Heart College in Auckland, then a university scholarship to the University of Otago.

In 1934, he received First Class Honours in English, and in 1935 a Dip. MA Single Honours in Latin. Winning a Rhodes Scholarship in 1935, he studied at Balliol College Oxford (BA, 1st class 1939, MA 1945). In 1939 he married Winifred Gonley, also from Southland; the couple had three daughters. One of their daughters, Delia, went on to become a writer on Chinese social issues.

== World War II ==
He was in the British Army (1939–40) then in the 2nd NZEF (1940–45), serving as an intelligence officer in the New Zealand Division in the Middle East, being evacuated from Greece and wounded on Crete. He was mentioned in despatches three times, and in December 1945 he was appointed an additional Member of the Military Division of the Order of the British Empire, in recognition of gallant and distinguished services in Italy. Writing the New Zealand official war history Crete took most of his spare time from 1946 to 1953.

== Post WWII ==
Post-war he took part in a BBC Radio discussion on the Battle of Monte Cassino with the former German commander Frido von Senger, who had also been a Rhodes Scholar, and Paddy Costello, who like Davin had been in Freyberg's intelligence team. Subsequently, he wrote of "New Zealanders at war, post-war tensions, exile and return".

== Work ==
He worked for Clarendon Press, Oxford (England), 1945–78, then as Assistant Secretary to the Delegates of Oxford University Press 1948–70 and Deputy Secretary to the Delegates 1970–78. He was a fellow of Balliol College 1920–78, then an emeritus fellow.

== Literature and views of New Zealand ==
Two of his novels, Cliffs of Fall (1945) and Not Here, Not Now (1970), are set in Otago University, although Bertram says they are "among his least satisfactory works". Dan and Winnie co-authored a publication for schools by the Department of Education School Publications Branch, Writing in New Zealand: The New Zealand Novel (1956, parts 1, 2). Chris Laidlaw, who used to drink with Davin in Oxford, said there was "an abiding sadness about Dan; a melancholy that sprang, I think, from his frustration at being a prophet without honour in his own country. ... He was an early victim of the great New Zealand clobbering machine and often warned me to beware of this." Laidlaw quoted Davin's view that in New Zealand there is a very strong "stereotype that controls what you can say or be seen to do."

== Honours and awards ==
In 1984, Davin was conferred an honorary DLitt by the University of Otago. In the 1987 New Year Honours, he was promoted to Commander of the Order of the British Empire, for services to literature.

== Death ==
Davin died in Oxford. According to Historian Rory Sweetman, who specializes in the history of the Irish in New Zealand, Davin is little remembered in Oxford, but is "cherished" in New Zealand.

== Books ==
His works of fiction are:

- Cliffs of Fall (1945)
- For the Rest of Our Lives (1947)
- The Gorse Blooms Pale (1947, short stories)
- Roads from Home (1949)
- The Sullen Bell (1956)
- No Remittance (1959)
- Not Here, Not Now (1970)
- Brides of Price (1972)
- Breathing Spaces (1975, short stories)

He also wrote some non-fiction books, including:

- Introduction to English Literature (1947, with John Mulgan)
- Crete (1953) The Official New Zealand War History
- Closing Times, his literary memoirs (1975, Oxford University Press)

He edited the anthology:

- Short Stories from the Second World War (1982)

He edited and wrote an introduction to:

- Katherine Mansfield - Selected Stories (1953, Oxford University Press)

== Sources ==
- James Bertram, Dan Davin, Zealand Writers and Their Work series, Oxford University Press, 1983, ISBN 0-19-558095-8
- Keith Ovenden, A Fighting Withdrawal: The Life of Dan Davin, Writer, Soldier, Oxford University Press, Oxford, 1996.
- James McNeish, Dance of the Peacocks: New Zealanders in Exile in the Time of Hitler and Mao Tse-tung, Vintage, Auckland, 2003
- Janet Wilson (ed.), Intimate Stranger: Reminiscences of Dan Davin, Steele Roberts, Wellington, 2000.
