= Rory Sweetman =

New Zealand historian

Rory Sweetman (born 1956) is a professional New Zealand historian. He teaches at the University of Otago in modern Irish history and has published widely on New Zealand's ethnic and religious past.

== Early life ==
Sweetman was born in Ireland and spent his childhood there and in New Zealand. He received his secondary education at St Peter's College, Auckland, New Zealand. He commenced his tertiary studies at the University of Auckland. He has history degrees from Trinity College Dublin (BA (Hons) 1981) and Peterhouse, Cambridge (Ph.D., 1991). Sweetman's doctorate from Cambridge University was on the subject, New Zealand Catholicism, War, Politics and the Irish Issue 1912-22.

== Academic career ==
Sweetman has specialised on the history of the Irish in New Zealand especially in the areas of religion, education, sectarianism and their engagement in general New Zealand politics. He helped develop the modern Irish history programme at the University of Otago from 1997 until 2003. He is completing biographies of Patrick Moran, first Catholic bishop of Dunedin 1869–95, and Henry William Cleary, editor of the New Zealand Tablet 1898-1910 and 6th Catholic bishop of Auckland 1910–29. He has written about the sedition trial of Bishop James Michael Liston and he has written a history of the integration of private schools (mostly Catholic) in New Zealand, published in 2002. He has written a number of institutional histories including a history of Otago Boys' High School which was published in 2013 in relation to its sesquicentennial and, more centrally to his academic interests, Defending Trinity College Dublin, Easter 1916: Anzacs and the Rising.

== Publications ==
Amongst Sweetman's published works are:

- Bishop in the dock : the sedition trial of James Liston, Auckland University Press, 1997.
- A fair and just solution? : a history of the integration of private schools in New Zealand, Dunmore Press, Palmerston North, 2002.
- Faith and fraternalism : a history of the Hibernian Society in New Zealand, 1869-2000, Hibernian Society, Wellington, 2002.
- Above the City: A History of Otago Boys' High School 1863-2013, Otago Boys' High School Foundation, Dunedin, 2013.
- Defending Trinity College Dublin, Easter 1916: Anzacs and the Rising, Four Courts Press, 2020, ISBN 978-1846827846
