= Walter Seddon Clayton =

Walter Seddon Clayton (24 March 1906 – 22 October 1997) was a key organiser of the Communist Party of Australia (CPA) in the 1930s and 1940s and suspected of being the Australian-based Soviet spymaster code-named 'KLOD', although the Australian Security Intelligence Organisation (ASIO) and Britains' MI5 were not able to provide any conclusive evidence of this for fear of tipping off the Soviets that their cable traffic was being deciphered and read by Western intelligence agencies.

Clayton migrated from New Zealand to Australia in 1930 and joined the Communist Party of Australia in 1933. He quickly moved up the ranks within the CPA, becoming responsible for the organisation and operation of the undercover and clandestine apparatus for the CPA while the party was outlawed. Clayton spent most of the 1940s and 1950s underground, playing a game of cat and mouse with the police and officers of the Australia's newly formed security service (ASIO).

== Early life and work ==
Clayton was born in New Zealand before settling in Melbourne, Australia in 1931, where he sold bags and goods wholesale.

== Communist Party career ==
Incensed by the Great Depression of the 1930s, Clayton joined the Communist Party of Australia (CPA) in 1933 where he quickly moved up the ranks. Clayton was well known for his public "soap box" appearances and was arrested in 1938 for protesting against a visit to Australia by a Nazi yachtsman.

Clayton was also "nabbed" during a police raid shortly after the CPA was declared illegal (in June 1940). Clayton was kept under investigation for his connections with the CPA. However, he went underground and was rarely seen again until his appearance at the Petrov Royal Commission. Some time in the 1940s, Clayton became a member of the CPA's Central Control Commission, which was responsible for internal discipline and the clandestine operations of the party.

== Espionage ==
While never charged with espionage or treason, Clayton was believed to be the Soviet spymaster code-named 'KLOD', who coordinated a network of spies in Canberra during the 1940s and early 1950s. According to decrypts from 'Venona', a United States counterintelligence program, KLOD received classified (and some not-so-classified) documents and information from a network of about 10 spies and passed this information to his Soviet handlers.

One of the decrypted Venona reports indicates that Clayton was embarrassed when paid for information that he provided in 1945. Clayton explained to his Soviet handler that he passed information for 'duty'.

== Royal Commission on Espionage ==
In May 1954, Clayton briefly emerged from hiding to appear at the Royal Commission on Espionage, which was the government's response to the Petrov affair. At the inquiry, Clayton denied ever having met anyone from the Soviet embassy and could not recall having met either Jim Hill or Ian Milner. Clayton mocked ASIO by going back into hiding shortly after his appearance at the Royal Commission.

== Operation Pigeon ==
Convinced that Clayton was the mastermind behind the Soviet intelligence network in Australia, ASIO retaliated against Clayton with Operation Pigeon, in an effort to get him to confess or to find others who would provide the much needed evidence of his treachery. In 1957, ASIO ramped up pressure on Clayton to confess.

Fearing that Clayton was about to defect to the Soviet Union, the Menzies government arranged for the cancellation of his and his wife's passports the day before they were due to depart Australia. According to Clayton's wife, Peace Joy Clayton, the two had progressed plans to migrate permanently to the USSR from April 1957.

Clayton was kept under ASIO surveillance throughout the 1950s and 1960s as part of Operation Pigeon. This surveillance may have even extended into the 1970s and 1980s.

Suspecting that Clayton might rendezvous with a Soviet submarine off the NSW coast, ASIO had reportedly even recruited the services of local fishermen in the Port Stephens area to monitor his movements at sea.

== Later life ==
In the mid-1950s, Clayton had fallen out of favour with the senior members of the CPA. Having failed in his attempt to defect to the Soviet Union, Clayton moved to a small home in Salt Ash, near Nelson Bay on the NSW coast. There he purchased a small fishing boat and became known as the "Snapper King" while fishing at Broughton Island.

== See also ==
Other individuals in place in the Australian Government and suspected of involvement with Clayton, include:

- Ian Milner — A New Zealand migrant who worked at the Department of External Affairs and who is suspected of passing classified documents to the Soviets in the 1940s under the code-name "BUR". Milner defected to Czechoslovakia in July 1950 shortly after MI5 interrogated James Frederick Hill in London. Hill was working with Milner at the Department of External Affairs at the time.
- John Burton — The former head of the Department of External Affairs during the time Ian Milner was allegedly passing classified documents to the Soviets. Burton is suspected of providing 'top-cover' for Milner's espionage activities.
- Jack Legge — Australian biochemist whose cousin George Legge, who worked for the political intelligence section of the External Affairs department, claimed he had set up a meeting with Clayton, where George Legge was asked to provide guidance for the CPA's foreign policy. Jack Legge, a communist, and friend of Clayton, worked in chemical weapons research during WW2, and denied this meeting had taken place.
