= Waitaki Boys' High School =

Location
- 45.0769°S 170.9946°E

Information
- Type: State, Boys, Secondary years 9–15
- Motto: Latin: Quanti est sapere (How valuable is Wisdom)
- Established: 1883
- Ministry of Education Institution no.: 365
- Rector: Darryl Paterson
- Enrolment: 425 (July 2026)
- Socio-economic decile: 6N
- Website: waitakibhs.school.nz

Waitaki Boys' High School is a secondary school for boys located in the northern part of the town of Oamaru, Otago, New Zealand, with day and boarding facilities, and was founded in 1883. As of 2020, it has a school roll of approximately 400 students.

The school has a house system with four houses, Don, Forrester, Lee and Sutherland. It organises some cultural activities together with its nearby sister school, Waitaki Girls' High School.

The school is notable for its British colonial architecture, encompassing such historic buildings such as the Hall of Memories, an assembly hall, built to honour its former pupils who died in various wars. Most of the blocks of classrooms at Waitaki Boys High School are named after famous past students, also known as Waitakians or Old Boys. The main, and oldest block of the school is named after Denis Blundell.

== History ==
The idea of establishing a boys' high school in Oamaru originated with Samuel Shrimski, who was one of the two members of parliament representing the Waitaki electorate.

== Enrolment ==
As of July 2026, the school has roll of 425 students, of which 66 (15.5%) identify as Māori.

As of 2026, the school has an Equity Index of 477, placing it amongst schools whose students have above average socioeconomic barriers to achievement (roughly equivalent to decile 4 under the former socio-economic decile system).

== Rectors ==
The following is a complete list of the rectors of Waitaki Boys' High School:

	Name	Term
1	John Harkness	1883–1896
2	John Robert Don	1897–1906
3	Frank Milner	1906–1944
4	Jim Burrows	1945–1949
5	Malcolm Leadbetter	1950–1960
6	John Hammond Donaldson	1961–1976
7	Keith Albert Laws	1976–1985
8	Geoff Tait	1986–1988
9	Benjamin Rory Gollop	1988–1998
10	Paul Baker	1999–2011
11	Paul Jackson	2012–2015
12	Clive Rennie	2016
13	Darryl Paterson	2017–present

== Notable alumni ==
- Peter Arnett – journalist
- Fraser Barron – bomber pilot during World War II
- James Bertram – professor, journalist
- Denis Blundell – lawyer, governor-general
- W. D. Borrie – demographer and academic
- Charles Brasch – poet
- Douglas Carter – former National MP for the Raglan electorate
- Ian Cathcart – basketball player
- Bramwell Cook - Salvation Army officer and doctor
- Gonville ffrench-Beytagh (1912–1991) – Dean of Johannesburg and an anti-apartheid activist.
- Sir Malcolm Grant – chairman of NHS England and Chancellor, University of York (former Provost and President of University College London (2003–2013)
- Ron Guthrey – Mayor of Christchurch (1968–1971)
- Dean Hall – video game designer, mountaineer
- A. M. Hamilton – engineer
- Brian Henderson – newsreader in Australia
- Lindsay Merritt Inglis (1894–1966), a senior officer in the New Zealand Military Forces
- Chris Jackson – medical oncologist and professor at University of Otago
- Donald Gilbert Kennedy, DSO, Navy Cross (U.S.) (1898–1976) – teacher, colonial administrator and Coastwatcher during the Solomon Islands campaign (World War II).
- Dylan Kennett (1994–) – Olympian and World Champion Track Cyclist
- Nigel Latta (1967–2025) – clinical psychologist, author and broadcaster
- Douglas Lilburn – Professor, composer
- Robert Macintosh (1897–1989), first Nuffield Professor of Anaesthetics, Oxford
- Terry McCombs – politician, headmaster
- Greg McGee – rugby union player and playwright
- Ian McLean – politician, economist
- Arnold Nordmeyer (1901–1989) – politician, Labour Party Minister of Finance 1957–1960
- David Sewell – cricketer
- Foss Shanahan – diplomat
- Angus Tait – electronics innovator and businessman
- Michael Trotter – archaeologist
- Des Wilson – campaigner in Britain
