= Frank Milner =

New Zealand school principal

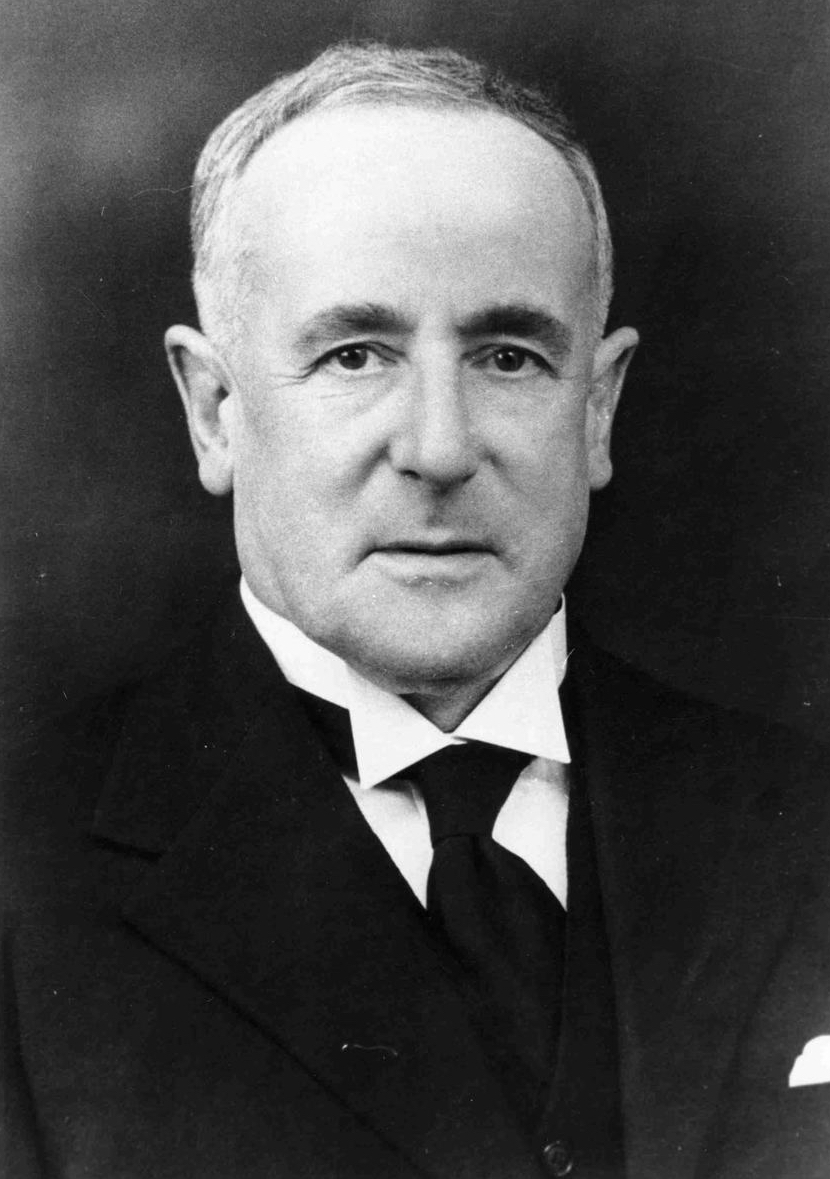
Frank Milner

Frank Milner CMG (7 November 1875 – 2 December 1944) was a notable New Zealand school principal and educationalist. He was born in Nelson, New Zealand on 7 November 1875.

Milner was educated at Nelson College from 1889 to 1892, and at Canterbury College, where he completed his BA in English and Latin in 1895, and his MA with first-class honours in language and literature in 1896.

He taught at Nelson College between 1897 and 1906, and applied unsuccessfully for the headmaster's position there in 1903. From 1906 until his death in 1944 Milner was the rector of Waitaki Boys' High School in Oamaru, where he was known as "The Man". In January 1907, he married Florence Violet George in Wellington.

In the 1925 New Year Honours Milner was appointed a Companion of the Order of St Michael and St George in recognition of his services to education in New Zealand, and in 1935 he was awarded the King George V Silver Jubilee Medal.

He was to stand in Oamaru for the National Party in the cancelled 1941 general election.

His son Ian Milner was later an Australian diplomat and civil servant, and then an academic at Charles University, Prague.
